= National Register of Historic Places listings in Pittsburgh, Pennsylvania =

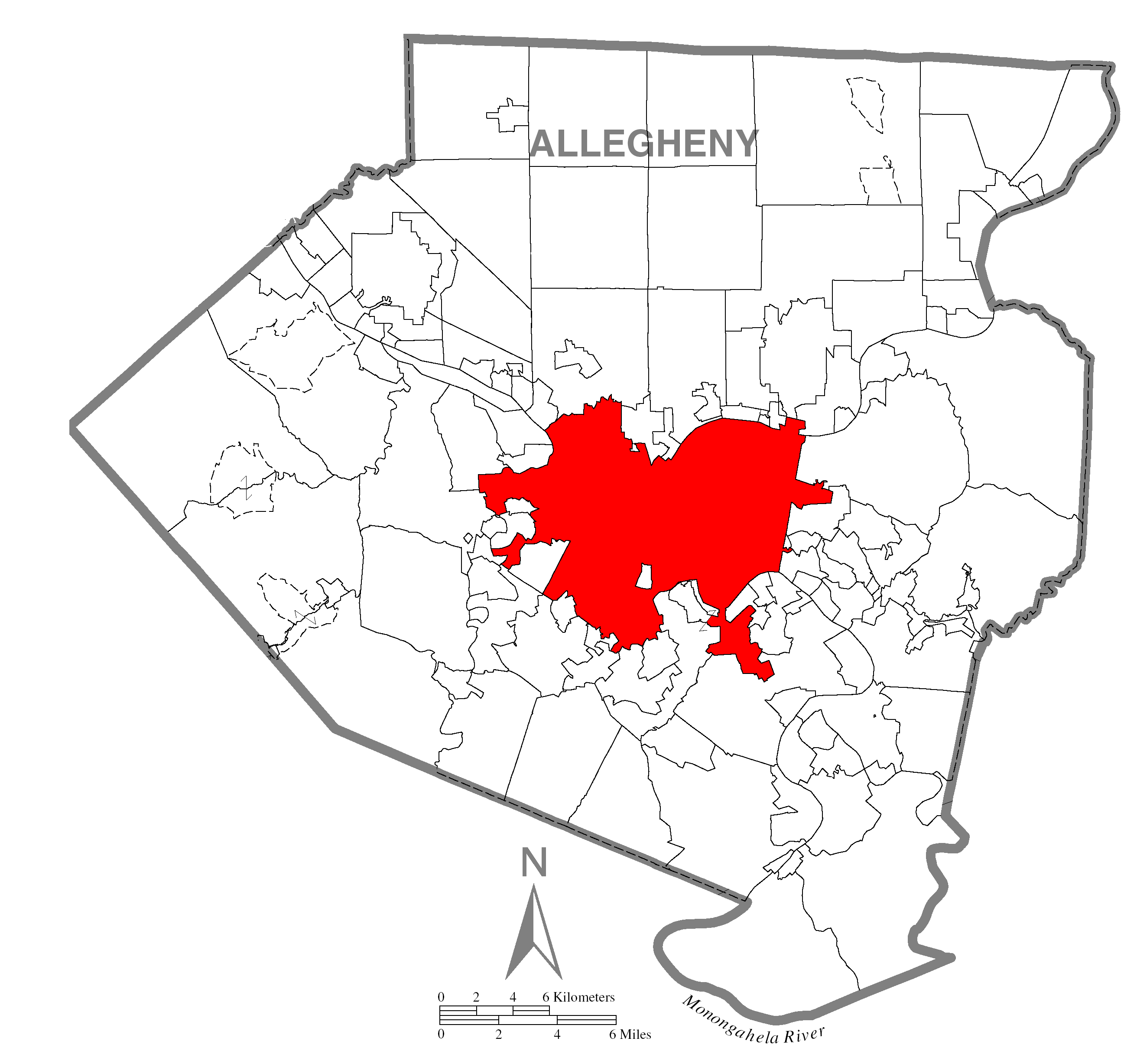
Location of Pittsburgh in Allegheny County

The city of Pittsburgh, Pennsylvania, United States, has 191 properties and districts listed on the National Register of Historic Places, including five National Historic Landmarks. The locations of National Register properties and districts for which the latitude and longitude coordinates are included below, may be seen in an online map.

Including those in Pittsburgh, there are 268 properties and districts listed on the National Register in Allegheny County, including ten National Historic Landmarks. Four properties are split between Pittsburgh and other parts of the county.

This National Park Service list is complete through NPS recent listings posted October 2, 2026.

== Current listings ==
	Name on the Register	Image	Date listed	Location	Neighborhood	Description
1	109–115 Wood Street	109–115 Wood Street	April 4, 1996 (#96000378)	109–115 Wood Street; 40°26′18″N 80°00′09″W	Central Business District	
2	Allegheny Cemetery	Allegheny Cemetery	December 10, 1980 (#80003405)	Roughly bounded by North Mathilda and Butler Streets, and Penn, Stanton, and Mossfield Avenues; 40°28′21″N 79°56′52″W	Central Lawrenceville	
3	Allegheny Commons	Allegheny Commons	September 17, 2013 (#13000740)	Roughly bounded by Stockton Street, Brighton Road, North, Cedar and Ridge Avenues; 40°27′12″N 80°00′44″W	Allegheny Center	
4	Allegheny County Courthouse and Jail	Allegheny County Courthouse and Jail	March 7, 1973 (#73001586)	436 Grant Street; 40°26′19″N 79°59′46″W	Central Business District	
5	Allegheny High School	Allegheny High School	September 30, 1986 (#86002643)	810 Arch Street; 40°27′11″N 80°00′32″W	Allegheny Center	
6	Allegheny Observatory	Allegheny Observatory	June 22, 1979 (#79002157)	159 Riverview Avenue; 40°28′53″N 80°01′11″W	Perry North	
7	Allegheny Post Office	Allegheny Post Office	July 27, 1971 (#71000683)	Allegheny Center; 40°27′09″N 80°00′26″W	Allegheny Center	
8	Allegheny River Lock and Dam No. 2	Allegheny River Lock and Dam No. 2	April 21, 2000 (#00000396)	7451 Lockway West; 40°29′24″N 79°54′51″W	Highland Park	Extends into O'Hara Township, elsewhere in Allegheny County
9	Allegheny Second Ward Industrial Historic District	Allegheny Second Ward Industrial Historic District	June 12, 2025 (#100011908)	Bounded roughly by Pennsylvania Avenue, Brighton Road/Drovers Way, W North Avenue/Buttercup Way, and Allegheny Avenue; 40°27′15″N 80°01′02″W	Central Northside, Allegheny West, Manchester, California-Kirkbride	
10	Allegheny West Historic District	Allegheny West Historic District	November 2, 1978 (#78002334)	Roughly bounded by Brighton Road, Jabok Way, Ridge and Allegheny Avenues; 40°27′07″N 80°00′01″W	Allegheny West	
11	Taylor Allderdice High School	Taylor Allderdice High School	September 30, 1986 (#86002641)	2409 Shady Avenue; 40°25′46″N 79°55′11″W	Squirrel Hill South	
12	Alpha Terrace Historic District	Alpha Terrace Historic District	July 18, 1985 (#85001570)	716–740 and 721–743 North Beatty Street; 40°28′10″N 79°55′22″W	East Liberty	
13	Arlington Apartments		January 20, 2026 (#100012591)	515 S. Aiken Avenue; 40°27′20″N 79°56′18″W	Shadyside	
14	Armstrong Cork Company	Armstrong Cork Company	May 10, 2005 (#05000413)	23rd and Railroad Streets; 40°27′16″N 79°59′00″W	Strip District	
15	Armstrong Tunnel	Armstrong Tunnel	January 7, 1986 (#86000015)	Between Forbes and 2nd Avenues at S. 10th Street; 40°26′16″N 79°59′33″W	Bluff	
16	Arsenal Junior High School	Arsenal Junior High School	September 30, 1986 (#86002645)	Butler and 40th Streets; 40°28′03″N 79°57′46″W	Lower Lawrenceville	
17	Baxter High School	Baxter High School	September 30, 1986 (#86002647)	Baxter Street and Brushton Avenue; 40°27′23″N 79°53′17″W	Homewood North	
18	Bayard School	Bayard School	September 30, 1986 (#86002649)	4830 Hatfield Street; 40°28′37″N 79°57′29″W	Central Lawrenceville	
19	Bedford School	Bedford School	September 30, 1986 (#86002651)	910–918 Bingham Street; 40°25′45″N 79°59′22″W	South Side Flats	
20	Beechwood Elementary School	Beechwood Elementary School	September 30, 1986 (#86002656)	Rockland Avenue near Sebring Avenue; 40°24′52″N 80°01′14″W	Beechview	
21	Bell Telephone Company of Pennsylvania Western Headquarters Building	Bell Telephone Company of Pennsylvania Western Headquarters Building	December 15, 2011 (#11000921)	201 Stanwix Street; 40°26′25″N 80°00′18″W	Central Business District	
22	Belmar School	Belmar School	March 14, 2025 (#100011513)	7109 Hermitage Street; 40°27′39″N 79°53′50″W	Homewood North	
23	Beltzhoover Elementary School	Beltzhoover Elementary School	September 30, 1986 (#86002657)	Cedarhurst and Estrella Streets; 40°25′05″N 80°00′06″W	Beltzhoover	
24	Bindley Hardware Company Building	Bindley Hardware Company Building	August 8, 1985 (#85001748)	401 Amberson Avenue; 40°27′13″N 79°56′28″W	Shadyside	
25	Birmingham Public School	Birmingham Public School	September 30, 1986 (#86002658)	118–128 S. 15th Street; 40°25′38″N 79°59′01″W	South Side Flats	
26	Boggs Avenue Elementary School	Boggs Avenue Elementary School	February 3, 1987 (#86002659)	Boggs and Southern Avenues; 40°25′02″N 80°00′48″W	Mount Washington	
27	Boys' Club of Pittsburgh	Boys' Club of Pittsburgh	January 19, 2018 (#100001976)	212 45th St. 40°28′19″N 79°57′33″W	Central Lawrenceville	
28	John A. Brashear House and Factory	John A. Brashear House and Factory	December 6, 2012 (#12001093)	1954 Perrysville Ave. 40°27′47″N 80°00′48″W	Perry South	Factory demolished after wall collapse, March 18, 2015
29	Buhl Building	Buhl Building	January 3, 1980 (#80003406)	204 5th Avenue; 40°26′28″N 80°00′07″W	Central Business District	
30	Burke Building	Burke Building	September 18, 1978 (#78002335)	2097–211 4th Avenue; 40°26′24″N 80°00′09″W	Central Business District	
31	Butler Street Gatehouse	Butler Street Gatehouse	July 30, 1974 (#74001734)	4734 Butler Street; 40°28′30″N 79°57′27″W	Central Lawrenceville	
32	Byers-Lyons House	Byers-Lyons House	November 19, 1974 (#74001735)	901 Ridge Avenue; 40°26′59″N 80°00′58″W	Allegheny West	
33	Byrnes & Kiefer Building	Byrnes & Kiefer Building	March 7, 1985 (#85000457)	1127–1133 Penn Avenue; 40°26′44″N 79°59′36″W	Strip District	
34	Calvary Episcopal Church	Calvary Episcopal Church	April 18, 2012 (#12000219)	315 Shady Ave. 40°27′22″N 79°55′20″W	Shadyside	
35	Carnegie Free Library of Allegheny	Carnegie Free Library of Allegheny	November 1, 1974 (#74001736)	Allegheny Center; 40°27′11″N 80°00′19″W	Allegheny Center	
36	Carnegie Institute and Library	Carnegie Institute and Library	March 30, 1979 (#79002158)	4400 Forbes Avenue; 40°26′34″N 79°57′02″W	North Oakland	
37	Cathedral of Learning	Cathedral of Learning	November 3, 1975 (#75001608)	Forbes Avenue and Bigelow Boulevard; 40°26′40″N 79°57′09″W	North Oakland	
38	Centre Avenue YMCA	Centre Avenue YMCA	November 3, 2021 (#100007092)	2621 Centre Ave. 40°26′50″N 79°58′04″W	Middle Hill	
39	Century Building	Century Building	August 13, 2008 (#08000781)	130 7th Street; 40°26′37″N 80°00′02″W	Central Business District	
40	Chatham Village Historic District	Chatham Village Historic District	November 25, 1998 (#98001372)	Roughly bounded by Virginia Avenue, Bigham Street, Woodruff Street, Saw Mill Run Boulevard, and Olympia Road; 40°25′52″N 80°01′01″W	Mount Washington	
41	Clayton-Frick Art Museum Historic District	Clayton-Frick Art Museum Historic District	May 23, 2025 (#100010583)	7227 Reynolds Street; 40°26′47″N 79°54′09″W	Point Breeze	
42	Colfax Elementary School	Colfax Elementary School	September 30, 1986 (#86002660)	Beechwood Boulevard and Phillips Avenue; 40°25′59″N 79°54′55″W	Squirrel Hill South	
43	Clifford B. Connelly Trade School	Clifford B. Connelly Trade School	September 30, 1986 (#86002661)	1501 Bedford Avenue; 40°26′39″N 79°59′19″W	Crawford-Roberts	
44	Conroy Junior High School	Conroy Junior High School	September 30, 1986 (#86002662)	Page and Fulton Streets; 40°27′06″N 80°01′27″W	Manchester	
45	Consolidated Ice Company Factory No. 2	Consolidated Ice Company Factory No. 2	November 8, 2000 (#00001348)	100 43rd Street; 40°28′28″N 79°57′51″W	Central Lawrenceville	
46	Crawford Grill No. 2	Crawford Grill No. 2	July 23, 2020 (#100005373)	2141 Wylie Ave. 40°26′43″N 79°58′40″W	Middle Hill	
47	Demmler Bros. Co. Warehouse	Demmler Bros. Co. Warehouse	March 6, 2026 (#100012777)	100 Ross Street; 40°26′11″N 79°59′50″W	Central Business District	
48	Deutschtown Historic District	Deutschtown Historic District	November 25, 1983 (#83004181)	Roughly bounded by Cedar Avenue, Knoll, East, and Pressley Streets; 40°27′18″N 80°00′00″W	East Allegheny	
49	Dilworth Elementary School	Dilworth Elementary School	September 30, 1986 (#86002663)	Saint Marie and Collins Streets; 40°28′06″N 79°55′03″W	East Liberty	
50	Dollar Savings Bank	Dollar Savings Bank	July 14, 1976 (#76001594)	4th Avenue and Smithfield Street; 40°26′19″N 80°00′01″W	Central Business District	
51	Duquesne Brewing Company	Duquesne Brewing Company	May 11, 2015 (#15000217)	Roughly bounded by S. 21st, S. 23rd & Jane Sts., Harcum & Edwards Ways; 40°25′34″N 79°58′29″W	South Side Flats	
52	Duquesne Incline	Duquesne Incline	March 4, 1975 (#75001609)	1220 Grandview Avenue; 40°26′21″N 80°01′05″W	Duquesne Heights	
53	East Carson Street Historic District	East Carson Street Historic District	November 17, 1983 (#83004183)	Roughly East Carson Street from 9th to 24th Street; 40°25′43″N 79°58′58″W	South Side Flats	
54	East Liberty Commercial Historic District	East Liberty Commercial Historic District	December 27, 2010 (#10001072)	Roughly bounded by Penn, Sheridan, and Centre Avenues and Kirkwood and South Whitfield Streets; 40°27′42″N 79°55′30″W	East Liberty	
55	East Liberty Market	East Liberty Market	December 12, 1977 (#77001121)	Centre Avenue and Baum Boulevard; 40°27′35″N 79°55′38″W	East Liberty	
56	Eberhardt and Ober Brewery	Eberhardt and Ober Brewery	November 5, 1987 (#87001984)	Troy Hill Road and Vinial Street; 40°27′25″N 79°59′29″W	Troy Hill	
57	Emmanuel Episcopal Church	Emmanuel Episcopal Church	May 3, 1974 (#74001737)	North and Allegheny Avenues; 40°27′11″N 80°01′10″W	Allegheny West	
58	Ewart Building	Ewart Building	August 9, 1979 (#79002159)	921, 923 and 925 Liberty Avenue; 40°26′36″N 79°59′52″W	Central Business District	
59	Fairfax Apartments	Fairfax Apartments	December 29, 2021 (#100007257)	4614 5th Ave. 40°26′49″N 79°56′54″W	North Oakland	
60	Fifth Avenue High School	Fifth Avenue High School	October 23, 1986 (#86002956)	1800 5th Avenue; 40°26′17″N 79°58′51″W	Bluff	
61	Firstside Historic District	Firstside Historic District	July 28, 1988 (#88001215)	Roughly bounded by the Boulevard of the Allies, Fort Pitt Boulevard, Grant and Stanwix Streets; 40°26′17″N 80°00′11″W	Central Business District	
62	Ford Motor Company Assembly Plant	Ford Motor Company Assembly Plant	November 20, 2018 (#100003134)	5000 Baum Boulevard; 40°27′18″N 79°56′42″W	Bloomfield	
63	Forks of the Ohio	Forks of the Ohio	October 15, 1966 (#66000643)	Point Park; 40°26′27″N 80°00′37″W	Central Business District	
64	Fort Pitt Elementary School	Fort Pitt Elementary School	September 30, 1986 (#86002666)	5101 Hillcrest Street; 40°28′08″N 79°56′30″W	Garfield	
65	Fortieth Street Bridge	Fortieth Street Bridge	June 22, 1988 (#88000820)	40th Street over the Allegheny River; 40°28′25″N 79°58′12″W	Central Lawrenceville/Lower Lawrenceville	Extends into Millvale, elsewhere in Allegheny County
66	Foster School	Foster School	September 30, 1986 (#86002667)	286 Main Street; 40°28′03″N 79°57′32″W	Central Lawrenceville	
67	Fourth Avenue Historic District	Fourth Avenue Historic District	September 5, 1985 (#85001961)	Roughly bounded by Smithfield Street, Market Square Place, 3rd and 5th Avenues; 40°26′22″N 80°00′02″W	Central Business District	
68	John Frew House	John Frew House	May 30, 2001 (#01000593)	105 Sterrett Street; 40°25′45″N 80°03′31″W	Westwood	
69	Frick Building and Annex	Frick Building and Annex	May 22, 1978 (#78002336)	437 Grant Street; 40°26′20″N 79°59′53″W	Central Business District	
70	Frick Park	Frick Park	February 28, 2019 (#100003450)	1981 Beechwood Blvd. 40°26′13″N 79°54′30″W	Point Breeze, Regent Square, Squirrel Hill South, Swisshelm Park	
71	Henry Clay Frick Training School for Teachers	Henry Clay Frick Training School for Teachers	September 30, 1986 (#86002668)	107 Thackeray Street; 40°26′36″N 79°57′29″W	North Oakland	
72	Fulton Building	Fulton Building	May 10, 2002 (#02000556)	107 6th Street; 40°26′38″N 80°00′09″W	Central Business District	Now the Byham Theater
73	Fulton Elementary School	Fulton Elementary School	September 30, 1986 (#86002669)	Hampton and North Saint Clair Streets; 40°28′30″N 79°55′19″W	Highland Park	
74	Gallagher-Kieffer House	Gallagher-Kieffer House	April 4, 2025 (#100011617)	234 North Dithridge Street; 40°27′00″N 79°57′09″W	North Oakland	
75	Gladstone School	Gladstone School	September 17, 2021 (#100006988)	327 Hazelwood Ave. 40°24′44″N 79°56′27″W	Hazelwood	
76	Greenfield Elementary School	Greenfield Elementary School	September 30, 1986 (#86002671)	North of Greenfield Avenue at East end of Alger Street; 40°25′35″N 79°56′41″W	Greenfield	
77	The Hanauer-Rosenberg Residence	The Hanauer-Rosenberg Residence	May 23, 2025 (#100011855)	417 Lockhart Street; 40°27′08″N 80°00′02″W	East Allegheny	
78	Hartley-Rose Belting Company Building	Hartley-Rose Belting Company Building	August 25, 1983 (#83002212)	425–427 1st Avenue; 40°26′13″N 79°59′59″W	Central Business District	
79	Hazelwood Brewing Company	Hazelwood Brewing Company	December 21, 2020 (#100005931)	5007, 5009, and 5011 Lytle St. 40°24′27″N 79°56′44″W	Hazelwood	
80	Heathside Cottage	Heathside Cottage	December 30, 1974 (#74001740)	416 Catoma Street; 40°27′39″N 80°00′13″W	Fineview	
81	H.J. Heinz Company	H.J. Heinz Company	July 10, 2002 (#02000774)	Roughly bounded by Chestnut Street, River Avenue, South Canal Street, Progress Street and Heinz modern Manufacturing Facilities; 40°27′20″N 79°59′27″W	Troy Hill	
82	Henderson-Metz House	Henderson-Metz House	August 22, 1979 (#79003141)	1516 Warren Street; 40°27′37″N 80°00′08″W	Fineview	
83	Highland Building	Highland Building	September 6, 1991 (#91001123)	121 South Highland Avenue; 40°27′36″N 79°55′29″W	East Liberty	
84	Highland Park	Highland Park	November 25, 2019 (#100004665)	Roughly bounded by Butler St., Washington Blvd., Stanton Ave., Farmhouse Dr., Bunker Hill St. & Heth's Run; 40°28′45″N 79°54′56″W	Highland Park	
85	Highland Park Residential Historic District	Highland Park Residential Historic District	August 30, 2007 (#07000888)	Roughly bounded by Highland Park, Heth's Run and Heth's Avenue, Chislett Street, Stanton Avenue and Jackson Street; 40°28′33″N 79°55′48″W	Highland Park	
86	Highland Towers Apartments	Highland Towers Apartments	September 28, 1976 (#76001595)	340 South Highland Avenue; 40°27′21″N 79°55′32″W	Shadyside	
87	Hoene-Werle House	Hoene-Werle House	November 15, 1984 (#84000533)	1313–1315 Allegheny Avenue; 40°27′17″N 80°01′12″W	Manchester	
88	Homestead High-Level Bridge	Homestead High-Level Bridge	January 7, 1986 (#86000016)	Monongahela River at West Street; 40°24′40″N 79°55′09″W	Squirrel Hill South	Extends into Homestead, elsewhere in Allegheny County
89	House at 200 West North Avenue	House at 200 West North Avenue	February 27, 1986 (#86000305)	200 West North Avenue; 40°27′19″N 80°00′32″W	Central Northside	
90	Houses at 2501–2531 Charles Street	Houses at 2501–2531 Charles Street	March 15, 1984 (#84003084)	2501–2531 North Charles Street; 40°28′02″N 80°01′07″W	Perry South	
91	Houses at 838–862 Brightridge Street	Houses at 838–862 Brightridge Street	March 1, 1984 (#84003081)	838–862 Brightridge Street; 40°27′42″N 80°01′08″W	Perry South	
92	Hunt Armory	Hunt Armory	November 14, 1991 (#91001697)	324 Emerson Street; 40°27′21″N 79°55′25″W	Shadyside	
93	Hunter Saw & Machine Company	Hunter Saw & Machine Company	January 7, 2021 (#100005985)	5648-5688 Butler St. 40°29′06″N 79°56′48″W	Upper Lawrenceville	
94	IBM Building	IBM Building	January 30, 2026 (#100012666)	4 Allegheny Center; 40°27′12″N 80°00′14″W	Allegheny Center	
95	International Harvester Company of America: Pittsburgh Branch House	International Harvester Company of America: Pittsburgh Branch House	April 12, 2021 (#100006371)	810 West North Ave. 40°27′15″N 80°00′56″W	Central Northside	
96	Jones and Laughlin Steel Company Building	Jones and Laughlin Steel Company Building	November 3, 2021 (#100007093)	200 Ross St. 40°26′12″N 79°59′49″W	Central Business District	
97	Kaufmann's Department Store Warehouse	Kaufmann's Department Store Warehouse	May 30, 1997 (#97000513)	1401 Forbes Avenue; 40°26′17″N 79°59′10″W	Bluff	
98	Knoxville Junior High School	Knoxville Junior High School	February 3, 1987 (#86002673)	Charles and Grimes Avenues; 40°24′58″N 79°59′39″W	Knoxville	
99	Henry Koerner House		January 12, 2023 (#100008534)	1055 South Negley Ave. 40°26′54″N 79°55′43″W	Squirrel Hill North	
100	Langley High School	Langley High School	September 30, 1986 (#86002674)	Sheraden Boulevard and Chartiers Avenue; 40°27′15″N 80°03′17″W	Sheraden	
101	Larimer School	Larimer School	September 30, 1986 (#86002675)	Larimer Avenue at Winslow Street; 40°27′56″N 79°54′46″W	Larimer	
102	Latimer School	Latimer School	September 30, 1986 (#86002676)	Tripoli and James Streets; 40°27′22″N 80°00′04″W	East Allegheny	
103	Lawrence Public School	Lawrence Public School	September 30, 1986 (#86002679)	3701 Charlotte Street; 40°28′01″N 79°57′57″W	Lower Lawrenceville	
104	Lawrenceville Historic District	Lawrenceville Historic District	July 8, 2019 (#100004020)	Roughly bounded by 33rd St, Allegheny R, 55th St., Allegheny Cemetery, Penn Ave., 40th St., Liberty Ave., and Sassafras St. 40°28′07″N 79°57′44″W	Lower Lawrenceville	
105	Lemington Elementary School	Lemington Elementary School	September 30, 1986 (#86002681)	7061 Lemington Avenue; 40°28′12″N 79°53′47″W	Lincoln–Lemington–Belmar	
106	Letsche Elementary School	Letsche Elementary School	September 30, 1986 (#86002682)	1530 Cliff Street; 40°26′41″N 79°59′17″W	Crawford-Roberts	
107	Liberty Bridge	Liberty Bridge	June 22, 1988 (#88000867)	Over the Monongahela River; 40°25′58″N 79°59′50″W	Central Business District	
108	Liberty School No. 4, Friendship Building	Liberty School No. 4, Friendship Building	September 30, 1986 (#86002684)	5501 Friendship Avenue; 40°27′44″N 79°56′09″W	Friendship	
109	Lincoln Elementary School	Lincoln Elementary School	September 30, 1986 (#86002685)	Lincoln and Frankstown Avenues; 40°27′36″N 79°54′42″W	Larimer	
110	Linden Avenue School	Linden Avenue School	September 30, 1986 (#86002686)	739 South Linden Avenue; 40°26′44″N 79°55′00″W	Point Breeze	
111	Loutellus Apartment Hotel	Loutellus Apartment Hotel	March 17, 2025 (#100011109)	231-245 Melwood Avenue; 40°27′04″N 79°57′01″W	North Oakland	
112	Madison Elementary School	Madison Elementary School	September 30, 1986 (#86002687)	Milwaukee and Orion Streets; 40°27′17″N 79°57′41″W	Upper Hill	
113	Main Building, U.S. Bureau of Mines	Main Building, U.S. Bureau of Mines	May 24, 1974 (#74001741)	4800 Forbes Avenue; 40°26′39″N 79°56′45″W	Squirrel Hill North	
114	Manchester Historic District	Manchester Historic District	September 18, 1975 (#75001611)	Irregular pattern contained with Faulsey, Chateau, Franklin, and Bidwell Streets; 40°27′15″N 80°01′29″W	Manchester	
115	McCleary Elementary School	McCleary Elementary School	September 30, 1986 (#86002690)	Holmes Street and McCandless Avenue; 40°28′49″N 79°57′04″W	Upper Lawrenceville	
116	McCook Family Estate	McCook Family Estate	April 20, 2011 (#11000197)	5105 Fifth Avenue and 925 Amberson Avenue; 40°26′53″N 79°56′18″W	Shadyside	
117	McKees Rocks Bridge	McKees Rocks Bridge	November 14, 1988 (#88002168)	Legislative Route 76, Spur 2, over the Ohio River at McKees Rocks; 40°28′37″N 80°02′56″W	Brighton Heights	Extends into McKees Rocks and Stowe Township, elsewhere in Allegheny County
118	Mellon Park	Mellon Park	February 2, 2023 (#100008596)	Roughly bounded by Shady, 5th, and Penn Aves; Beechwood and Bakery Square Blvds; and Mellon Park Rd. 40°27′08″N 79°55′05″W	Point Breeze, Shadyside	
119	Mexican War Streets Historic District	Mexican War Streets Historic District	May 28, 1975 (#75001612)	Irregular pattern between Brighton and Arch Streets and between O'Hern and West Park; also roughly bounded by Armandale Street, Carrington Street, Charlick Way, Reddour Street, and West North Avenue; 40°27′24″N 80°00′45″W	Central Northside	Second set of boundaries represents a boundary increase
120	Mifflin Elementary School	Mifflin Elementary School	September 30, 1986 (#86002692)	Mifflin Road at Lincoln Place; 40°22′12″N 79°54′53″W	Hays	
121	Monongahela Incline	Monongahela Incline	June 25, 1974 (#74001742)	Grandview Avenue at Wyoming Avenue; 40°25′55″N 80°00′20″W	Mount Washington	
122	Moreland-Hoffstot House	Moreland-Hoffstot House	February 23, 1978 (#78002337)	5057 5th Avenue; 40°26′52″N 79°56′25″W	Shadyside	
123	John Morrow Elementary School	John Morrow Elementary School	September 30, 1986 (#86002693)	1611 Davis Avenue; 40°28′48″N 80°02′23″W	Brighton Heights	
124	Samuel F.B. Morse School	Samuel F.B. Morse School	September 30, 1986 (#86002694)	2418 Sarah Street; 40°25′37″N 79°58′15″W	South Side Flats	
125	New Granada Theater	New Granada Theater	December 27, 2010 (#10001071)	2007–2013 Centre Avenue; 40°26′39″N 79°58′48″W	Middle Hill	
126	Ninth Street Bridge	Ninth Street Bridge	January 7, 1986 (#86000019)	Allegheny River at 9th Street; 40°26′48″N 80°00′01″W	Central Business District	
127	Oakland Public School	Oakland Public School	February 3, 1987 (#86002696)	Dawson Street near Edith Place; 40°25′56″N 79°57′14″W	South Oakland	
128	Old Allegheny Rows Historic District	Old Allegheny Rows Historic District	November 1, 1984 (#84000349)	Roughly bounded by Sedgwick, California, Marquis, Mero, Brighton, and Moorison Streets; 40°27′34″N 80°01′09″W	California-Kirkbride	
129	Old Heidelberg Apartments	Old Heidelberg Apartments	May 4, 1976 (#76001596)	Braddock Avenue at Waverly Street; 40°26′38″N 79°53′45″W	Point Breeze	
130	David B. Oliver High School	David B. Oliver High School	February 3, 1987 (#86002698)	Brighton Road and Island Avenue; 40°27′50″N 80°01′28″W	Marshall-Shadeland	
131	Frederick J. Osterling Office and Studio	Frederick J. Osterling Office and Studio	September 5, 1985 (#85001964)	228 Isabella Street; 40°26′54″N 80°00′06″W	North Shore	
132	Park Place School	Park Place School	September 30, 1986 (#86002701)	South Braddock and Brashear Avenues; 40°26′42″N 79°53′44″W	Point Breeze	
133	Penn-Liberty Historic District	Penn-Liberty Historic District	November 18, 1987 (#87001995)	Roughly bounded by Liberty Avenue, Fort Duquesne Boulevard, Stanwix, 9th, French and 10th Streets; 40°26′38″N 79°59′49″W	Central Business District	
134	Pennsylvania Railroad Bridge	Pennsylvania Railroad Bridge	August 13, 1979 (#79002160)	11th Street; 40°26′58″N 79°59′50″W	North Shore	
135	Pennsylvania Railroad Station	Pennsylvania Railroad Station	April 22, 1976 (#76001597)	1101 Liberty Avenue; 40°26′39″N 79°59′31″W	Central Business District	
136	Perry High School	Perry High School	September 30, 1986 (#86002702)	Perrysville Avenue and Semicir Street; 40°29′20″N 80°01′08″W	Perry North	
137	Phipps Conservatory	Phipps Conservatory	November 13, 1976 (#76001598)	Schenley Park; 40°26′19″N 79°56′52″W	Central Oakland	
138	Phipps-McElveen Building	Phipps-McElveen Building	May 5, 2000 (#00000451)	525–529 Penn Avenue; 40°26′34″N 80°00′10″W	Central Business District	
139	Pittsburgh & Lake Erie Railroad Station	Pittsburgh & Lake Erie Railroad Station	January 11, 1974 (#74001743)	Smithfield Street at Carson Street; 40°26′01″N 80°00′14″W	South Shore	
140	Pittsburgh and Lake Erie Railroad Complex	Pittsburgh and Lake Erie Railroad Complex	December 31, 1979 (#79002161)	Smithfield and Carson Streets; 40°26′06″N 80°00′27″W	South Shore	Now Station Square
141	Pittsburgh Athletic Association Building	Pittsburgh Athletic Association Building	December 15, 1978 (#78002338)	4215 5th Avenue; 40°26′42″N 79°57′17″W	Central Oakland	
142	Pittsburgh Brass Manufacturing Company Building	Pittsburgh Brass Manufacturing Company Building	February 2, 2016 (#15001030)	3147–3155 Penn Ave. 40°27′39″N 79°58′13″W	Strip District	
143	Pittsburgh Central Downtown Historic District	Pittsburgh Central Downtown Historic District	December 17, 1985 (#85003216)	Roughly bounded by 4th, 6th, 7th and Liberty Avenues, former Pennsylvania Railroad tracks, Grant and Wood Streets; 40°26′29″N 79°59′50″W	Central Business District	
144	Pittsburgh Mercantile Company Building	Pittsburgh Mercantile Company Building	December 29, 2014 (#14001099)	2600 E. Carson Street; 40°25′38″N 79°58′06″W	South Side Flats	
145	Pittsburgh Renaissance Historic District	Pittsburgh Renaissance Historic District	May 2, 2013 (#13000252)	Roughly bounded by Stanwix Street, Allegheny, Monongahela and Ohio Rivers; 40°26′29″N 80°00′25″W	Central Business District	
146	Pittsburgh Terminal Warehouse and Transfer Company	Pittsburgh Terminal Warehouse and Transfer Company	May 8, 2013 (#13000253)	333–400 East Carson Street; 40°25′47″N 79°59′49″W	South Side Flats	
147	Prospect Junior High and Elementary School	Prospect Junior High and Elementary School	September 30, 1986 (#86002705)	Prospect Avenue near Southern Avenue; 40°25′42″N 80°00′37″W	Mount Washington	
148	Reymer Brothers Candy Factory	Reymer Brothers Candy Factory	May 30, 1997 (#97000514)	1425 Forbes Avenue; 40°26′16″N 79°59′07″W	Bluff	
149	Riverview Park	Riverview Park	March 1, 2021 (#100006181)	Roughly bounded by Woods Run Ave., Mairdale Ave., Perrysville Ave., and Kilbuck St. 40°28′57″N 80°01′16″W	Perry North	
150	Rodef Shalom Temple	Rodef Shalom Temple	November 15, 1979 (#79002162)	4905 5th Avenue; 40°26′53″N 79°56′37″W	Shadyside	
151	Rotunda of the Pennsylvania Railroad Station	Rotunda of the Pennsylvania Railroad Station	April 11, 1973 (#73001587)	1100 Liberty Avenue at Grant Street; 40°26′39″N 79°59′34″W	Central Business District	
152	St. Boniface Roman Catholic Church	St. Boniface Roman Catholic Church	November 17, 1981 (#81000525)	East Street; 40°28′01″N 80°00′00″W	Spring Hill–City View	
153	St. John the Baptist Ukrainian Catholic Church	St. John the Baptist Ukrainian Catholic Church	October 29, 1974 (#74001747)	109 South 7th Street; 40°25′43″N 79°59′31″W	South Side Flats	
154	St. Stanislaus Kostka Roman Catholic Church	St. Stanislaus Kostka Roman Catholic Church	September 14, 1972 (#72001089)	21st and Smallman Streets; 40°27′08″N 79°59′01″W	Strip District	
155	The Salvation Army Building	The Salvation Army Building	February 2, 2016 (#15001031)	425–435 Boulevard of the Allies; 40°26′15″N 79°59′56″W	Central Business District	
156	Schenley Farms Historic District	Schenley Farms Historic District	July 22, 1983 (#83002213)	Roughly bounded by Andover Terrace, Centre, Bellefield, and Parkman Avenues, Dithridge, Thackeray, Forbes and Mawhinney; also 4400 Centre Avenue; also Approx. intersection of Bigelow Blvd and N. Dithridge St. 40°26′47″N 79°57′12″W	North Oakland	Second and third address groups represents boundary increases approved November 28, 2012 and January 3, 2025.
157	Schenley High School	Schenley High School	September 30, 1986 (#86002706)	Bigelow Boulevard and Centre Avenue; 40°27′01″N 79°57′17″W	North Oakland	
158	Schenley Park	Schenley Park	November 13, 1985 (#85003506)	Schenley Drive and Panther Hollow Road; 40°26′04″N 79°56′34″W	Squirrel Hill South	
159	Schiller Elementary School	Schiller Elementary School	September 30, 1986 (#86002707)	1018 Peralta Street; 40°27′23″N 79°59′35″W	East Allegheny	
160	James Scott House	James Scott House	May 30, 1997 (#97000515)	5635 Stanton Avenue; 40°28′16″N 79°55′28″W	Highland Park	
161	Sellers House	Sellers House	September 7, 1979 (#79003142)	400 Shady Avenue; 40°27′19″N 79°55′22″W	Shadyside	
162	Seventh Street Bridge	Seventh Street Bridge	January 7, 1986 (#86000018)	Allegheny River at 7th Street; 40°26′45″N 80°00′05″W	Central Business District	
163	Shadyside Presbyterian Church	Shadyside Presbyterian Church	April 3, 1975 (#75001613)	Amberson Avenue and Westminster Place; 40°26′56″N 79°56′20″W	Shadyside	
164	Sixteenth Street Bridge	Sixteenth Street Bridge	August 13, 1979 (#79002163)	Spans the Allegheny River; 40°27′04″N 79°59′26″W	Central Business District	
165	Sixth Street Bridge	Sixth Street Bridge	January 7, 1986 (#86000017)	Allegheny River at 6th Street; 40°26′43″N 80°00′12″W	Central Business District	
166	Smithfield Street Bridge	Smithfield Street Bridge	March 21, 1974 (#74001745)	Smithfield Street at the Monongahela River; 40°26′05″N 80°00′08″W	Central Business District	
167	William Penn Snyder House	William Penn Snyder House	May 3, 1976 (#76001599)	852 Ridge Avenue; 40°27′01″N 80°00′57″W	Allegheny West	
168	Soldiers and Sailors Memorial Hall	Soldiers and Sailors Memorial Hall	December 30, 1974 (#74001746)	5th Avenue at Bigelow Boulevard; 40°26′43″N 79°57′23″W	North Oakland	
169	South Side High School	South Side High School	September 30, 1986 (#86002709)	900 East Carson Street; 40°25′42″N 79°59′20″W	South Side Flats	
170	South Side Market Building	South Side Market Building	October 14, 1976 (#76001600)	12th and Bingham Streets; 40°25′46″N 79°59′11″W	South Side Flats	
171	South Tenth Street Bridge	South Tenth Street Bridge	January 7, 1986 (#86000020)	Monongahela River at S. 10th Street; 40°25′57″N 79°59′23″W	Bluff	
172	Springfield Public School	Springfield Public School	September 30, 1986 (#86002711)	Smallman and 31st Streets; 40°27′36″N 79°58′20″W	Strip District	
173	Stanley Theater and Clark Building	Stanley Theater and Clark Building	February 27, 1986 (#86000303)	207 7th Street and 701–717 Liberty Avenue; 40°26′35″N 80°00′00″W	Central Business District	
174	Sterrett Sub-District School	Sterrett Sub-District School	September 30, 1986 (#86002713)	339 Lang Avenue; 40°26′48″N 79°54′20″W	Point Breeze	
175	Strip Historic District	Strip Historic District	May 2, 2014 (#14000194)	Roughly bounded by former Pennsylvania Railroad yards, Liberty Avenue, Railroad, 22nd and 15th Streets; 40°27′00″N 79°59′06″W	Strip District	
176	Teutonia Maennerchor Hall	Teutonia Maennerchor Hall	May 14, 2004 (#04000439)	857 Phineas Street; 40°27′19″N 79°59′42″W	East Allegheny	
177	Try Street Terminal	Try Street Terminal	December 28, 2007 (#07001327)	600–620 2nd Avenue; 40°26′09″N 79°59′45″W	Central Business District	
178	Tuberculosis Hospital of Pittsburgh	Tuberculosis Hospital of Pittsburgh	February 25, 1993 (#93000073)	2851 Bedford Avenue; 40°27′12″N 79°58′07″W	Bedford Dwellings	
179	Union Trust Building	Union Trust Building	January 21, 1974 (#74001748)	435 Grant Street; 40°26′23″N 79°59′48″W	Central Business District	
180	US Post Office and Courthouse-Pittsburgh	US Post Office and Courthouse-Pittsburgh	February 2, 1995 (#94001620)	700 Grant St. 40°26′33″N 79°59′40″W	Central Business District	
181	Ursuline Young Ladies Academy	Ursuline Young Ladies Academy	September 4, 2012 (#12000604)	201 South Winebiddle Street; 40°27′51″N 79°56′32″W	Bloomfield	
182	Washington Vocational School	Washington Vocational School	September 30, 1986 (#86002715)	169 40th Street; 40°28′10″N 79°57′47″W	Central Lawrenceville	
183	West End-North Side Bridge	West End-North Side Bridge	August 24, 1979 (#79003143)	Western Avenue and Carson Street; 40°26′53″N 80°01′35″W	Chateau	
184	Western State Penitentiary-Riverside Penitentiary	Western State Penitentiary-Riverside Penitentiary	February 14, 2022 (#100007417)	3001 New Beaver Ave. 40°28′12″N 80°02′21″W	Marshall-Shadeland	
185	Westinghouse High School	Westinghouse High School	September 30, 1986 (#86002716)	1101 North Murtland Street; 40°27′39″N 79°54′04″W	Homewood West	
186	Whitehill-Gleason Motors	Whitehill-Gleason Motors	July 22, 1999 (#99000878)	5815 Baum Boulevard; 40°27′35″N 79°55′49″W	East Liberty	
187	Wightman School	Wightman School	September 30, 1986 (#86002717)	5604 Solway Street; 40°26′34″N 79°55′36″W	Squirrel Hill North	
188	William Penn Hotel	William Penn Hotel	March 7, 1985 (#85000458)	Mellon Square between 6th and Oliver Streets; 40°26′25″N 79°59′46″W	Central Business District	
189	August Wilson House	August Wilson House	April 30, 2013 (#13000254)	1727 Bedford Avenue; 40°26′43″N 79°59′08″W	Crawford-Roberts	
190	John Woods House	John Woods House	April 29, 1993 (#93000353)	4604 Monongahela Street; 40°24′53″N 79°56′41″W	Hazelwood	
191	Woolslair Elementary School	Woolslair Elementary School	September 30, 1986 (#86002718)	40th Street and Liberty Avenue; 40°27′48″N 79°57′26″W	Lower Lawerenceville	

== See also ==
- National Register of Historic Places listings in Allegheny County, Pennsylvania
- National Register of Historic Places listings in Pennsylvania
- List of National Historic Landmarks in Pennsylvania
- List of City of Pittsburgh historic designations
- List of Pittsburgh History and Landmarks Foundation Historic Landmarks
- List of Pennsylvania state historical markers in Allegheny County
