= McCleary Elementary School =

Historic building in Pennsylvania, US

- U.S. National Register of Historic Places
- U.S. Historic district – Contributing property
- Pittsburgh Landmark – PHLF
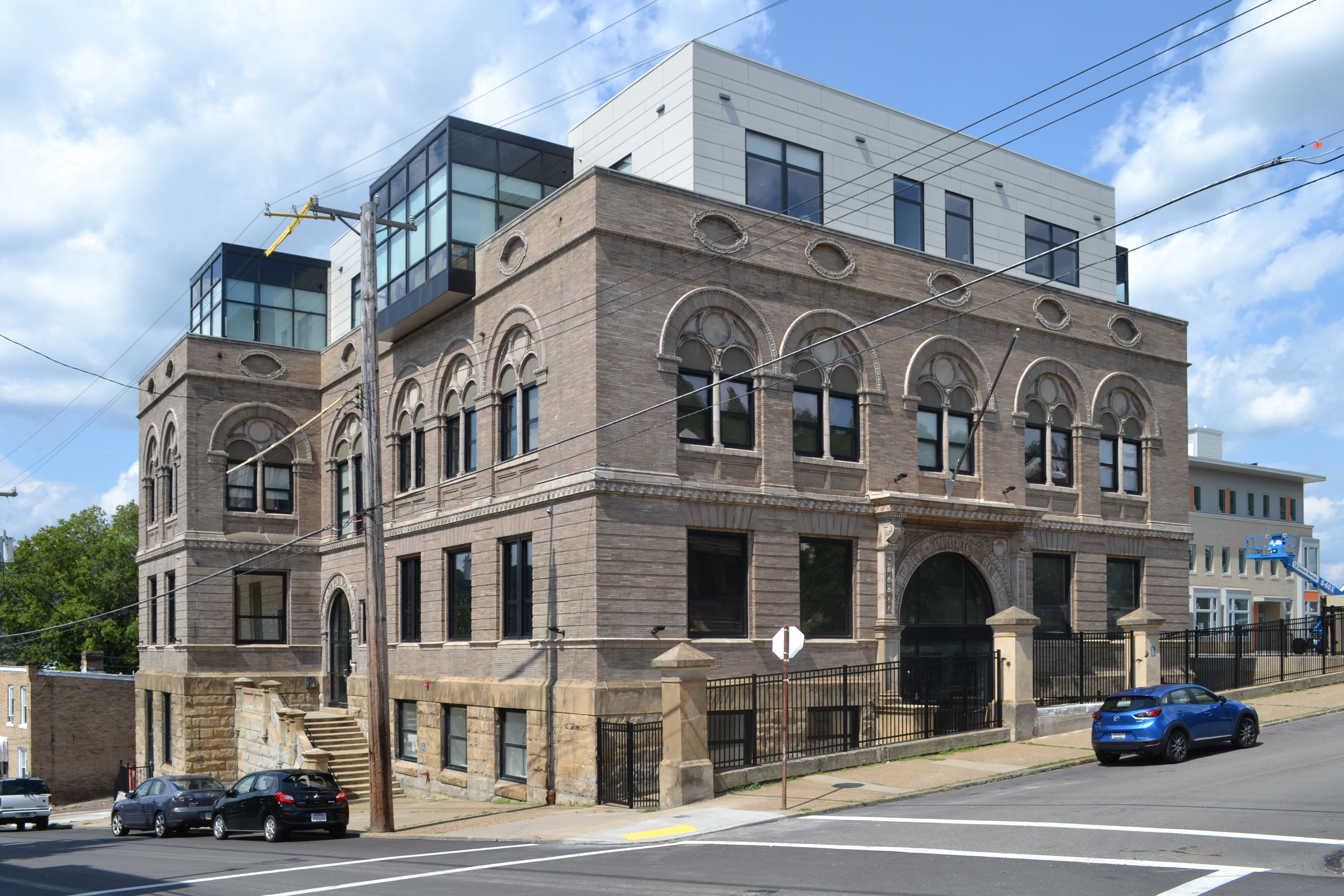
- The building in 2017 after completion of the third-floor addition

- Location within Pittsburgh Location within Pennsylvania Location within the United States
- Location: Holmes St. and McCandless Ave., Pittsburgh, Pennsylvania
- Coordinates: 40°28′49″N 79°57′04″W
- Area: less than one acre
- Built: 1900–02
- Architect: Ulysses J. Lincoln Peoples
- Architectural style: Renaissance
- Part of: Lawrenceville Historic District (ID100004020)
- MPS: Pittsburgh Public Schools TR
- NRHP reference No.: 86002690

Significant dates
- Added to NRHP: September 30, 1986
- Designated CP: July 8, 2019
- Designated PHLF: 2002

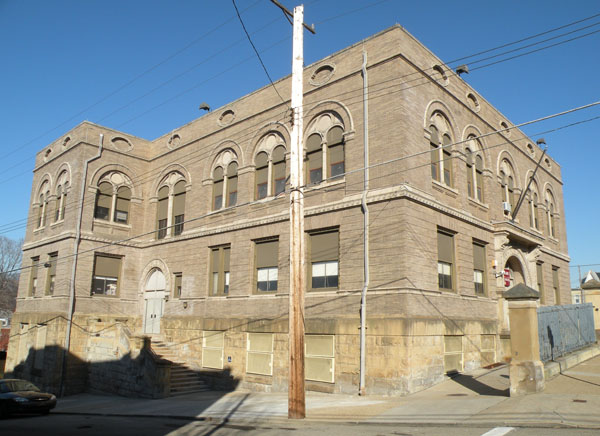
The school in 2009, before being converted for residential use

The McCleary Elementary School (also known as McCleary Traditional Academy, and more recently as McCleary Early Childhood Center) is a former elementary school located in the Upper Lawrenceville neighborhood of Pittsburgh, Pennsylvania, United States, and is a building from 1900.

It was listed on the National Register of Historic Places in 1986.

== History ==
The McCleary School was built in 1900–02 by the Mount Albion Sub-District, the local educational board serving the 18th Ward or present-day Upper Lawrenceville, Stanton Heights, and Morningside. Infighting and mismanagement by the Mount Albion school board caused major schedule and budget overruns, and the board ended up having to levy additional taxes to finish the project. The final cost of the building was about $130,000, which was almost four times the original budget, and construction dragged on for two more years even though the school was said to be "nearly complete" in June, 1900. The school even had to be equipped with used furnishings in order to reduce costs. As a result of widespread ill will toward the project among the general public, the school opened without any fanfare on April 7, 1902, in what the Pittsburgh Press called "the quietest opening of a school building the city has ever seen."

The building was last used by Pittsburgh Public Schools during the 2011–12 school year as an early childhood education center. In 2013, the school was sold to a developer for $410,000. It was then renovated and converted to condominiums in 2015–17. The project also added a third story to the building.

== Architecture ==
The McCleary School is a two-story brick building with stone trim. The main elevation is five bays wide, with rectangular windows on the first floor and pairs of arched windows set inside larger arched openings on the second floor. The main entrance, which sits slightly below street level, is set inside a large semicircular arch and accentuated with a cornice, pilasters, and spandrels ornamented with floral motifs. The building originally had a hipped roof with a stained-glass dome, but this was later replaced with a flat roof. The interior of the building had eight classrooms arranged around a central two-story rotunda.
