= Central Lawrenceville =

- Neighborhood of Pittsburgh
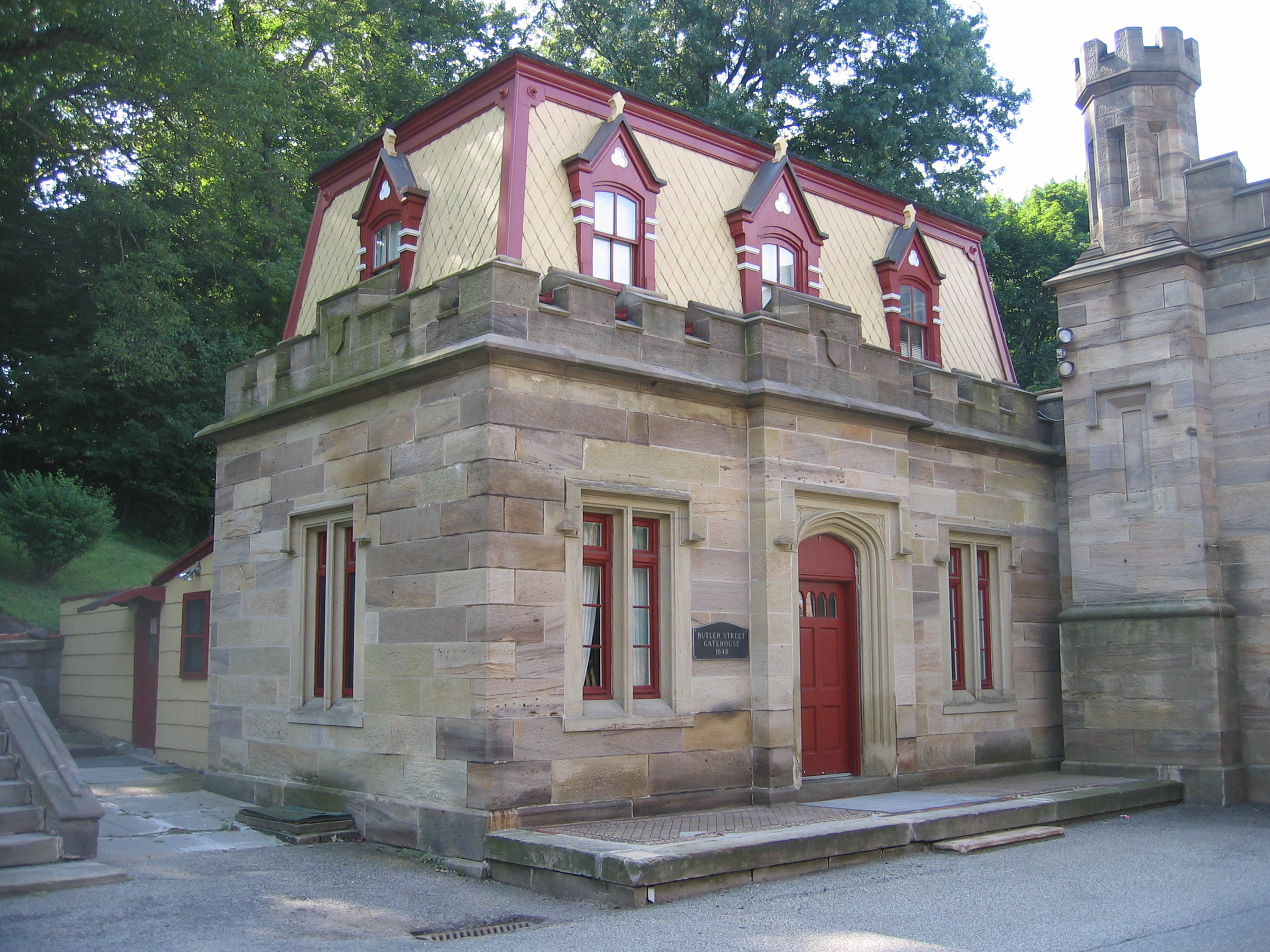
- Butler Street Gatehouse of Allegheny Cemetery

- Coordinates: 40.472°N 79.959°W
- Country: United States
- State: Pennsylvania
- County: Allegheny County
- City: Pittsburgh

Area
  - Total: 0.963 sq mi (2.49 km^{2})

Population (2010)
  - Total: 4,482
  - Density: 4,650/sq mi (1,800/km^{2})
- ZIP Code: 15201

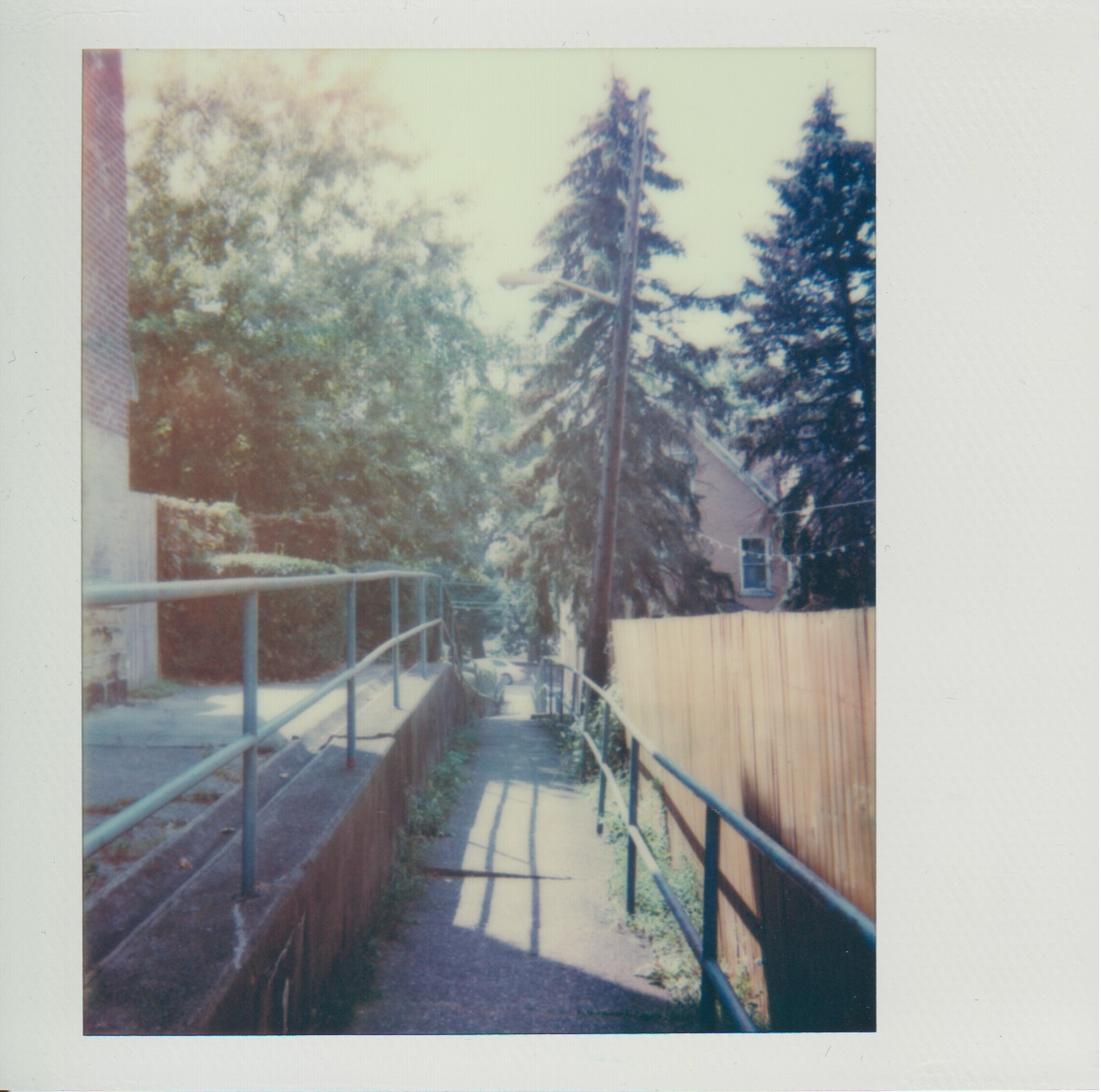
The Government Way city steps in Central Lawrenceville

Central Lawrenceville is a neighborhood in the northeast of Pittsburgh, Pennsylvania in the United States. It has a zip code of 15201, and has representation on Pittsburgh City Council by the council member for District 7 (North Central East Neighborhoods). It is home to Allegheny Cemetery. Central Lawrenceville is the home of the Pittsburgh Bureau of Fire's 6 Engine and 6 Truck.

== Surrounding and adjacent neighborhoods ==
Central Lawrenceville has five land borders with the Pittsburgh neighborhoods of Upper Lawrenceville to the north, Stanton Heights to the east and northeast, Garfield to the southeast, Bloomfield to the south, and Lower Lawrenceville to the southwest. Across the Allegheny River to the northwest, Central Lawrenceville runs adjacent with Millvale (with a direct connector via 40th Street Bridge) and Shaler Township.

== City Steps ==
The Central Lawrenceville neighborhood has one distinct flight of city steps which connects residents to two popular amenities. In Central Lawrenceville, the Government Way public stairways in Pittsburgh provides easy access between the Carnegie Public Library Lawrenceville branch and Arsenal Park. These sidewalk steps provide a safe passage for walkers of all ages.

== See also ==
- Lawrenceville (Pittsburgh)
- List of Pittsburgh neighborhoods
