= Ford Motor Company Assembly Plant (Pittsburgh, Pennsylvania) =

- U.S. National Register of Historic Places
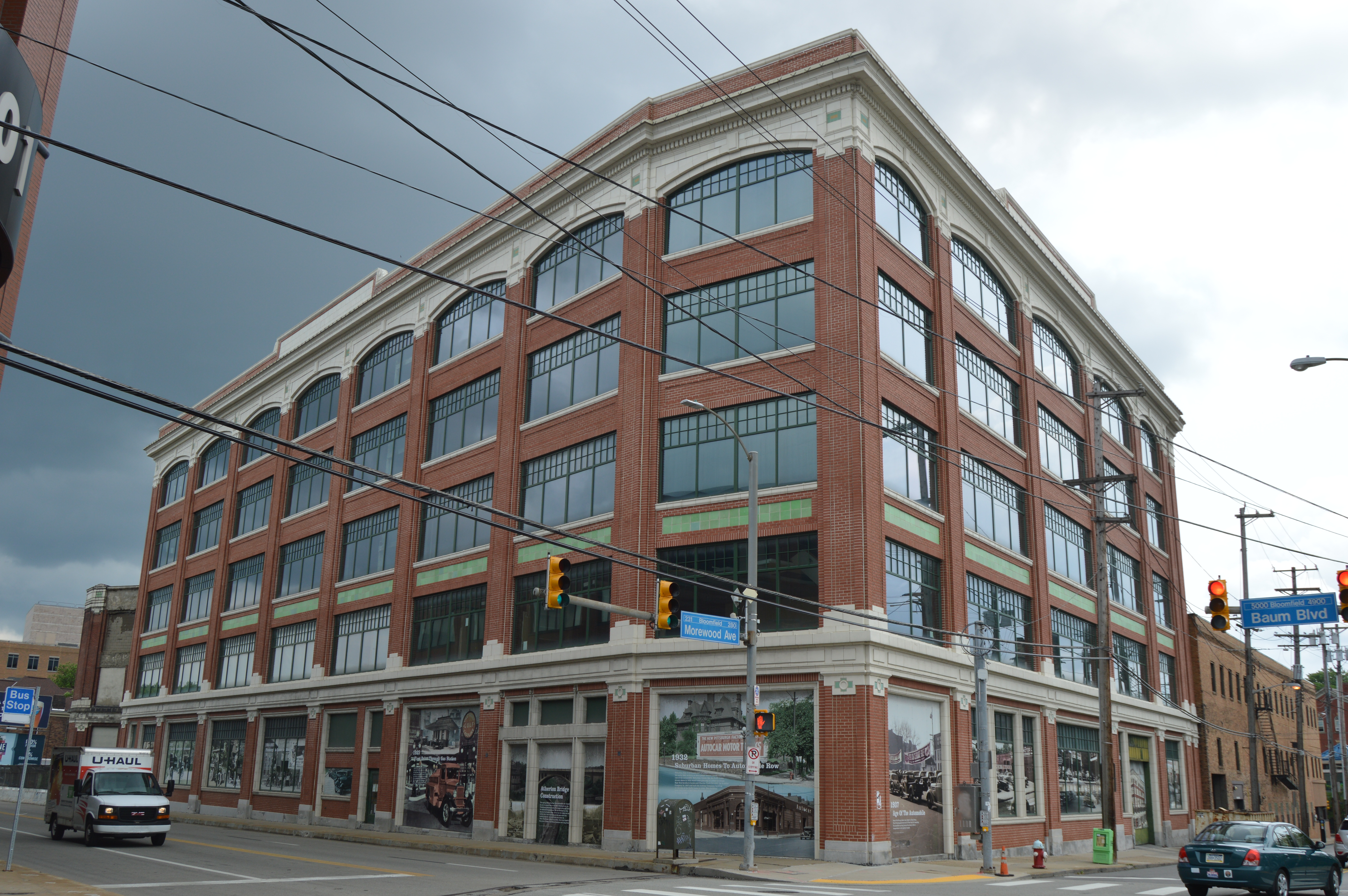
- The former plant in 2019

- Location within Pittsburgh Location within Pennsylvania Location within the United States
- Location: 5000 Baum Boulevard; Pittsburgh, Pennsylvania
- Coordinates: 40°27′18″N 79°56′42″W
- Built: 1915
- Architect: John H. Graham, Sr.
- NRHP reference No.: 100003134
- Added to NRHP: November 20, 2018

The Ford Motor Company Assembly Plant is a historic former automobile assembly plant in the Bloomfield neighborhood of Pittsburgh, Pennsylvania. Located along a stretch of Baum Boulevard nicknamed "Automobile Row" due to its high concentration of auto-related businesses, the plant was built in 1915 by Ford Motor Company to assemble Ford Model T cars using the company's pioneering mass production processes. It was designed by Ford's corporate architect John H. Graham, Sr. and constructed from reinforced concrete. The plant consists of an eight-story main building which contained the assembly areas and a vehicle showroom, and a six-story crane shed which was used to hoist parts unloaded from the adjacent Pennsylvania Railroad tracks to the appropriate level for assembly. Due to the steeply sloping site, the building has only five stories above grade along the street elevations.

The plant stopped producing cars in 1932, but remained in use for vehicle and parts sales until 1953. The building then went through a variety of light industrial uses before being purchased by the University of Pittsburgh Medical Center (UPMC) in 2006. It was subsequently purchased by the University of Pittsburgh in 2018, the same year the property was added to the National Register of Historic Places. It is currently being renovated to house the UPMC Immune Transplant and Therapy Center, a collaboration between the university and UPMC. The center is scheduled to open in 2022.
