= Demmler Brothers Warehouse =

- Demmler Bros. Co. Warehouse
- U.S. National Register of Historic Places
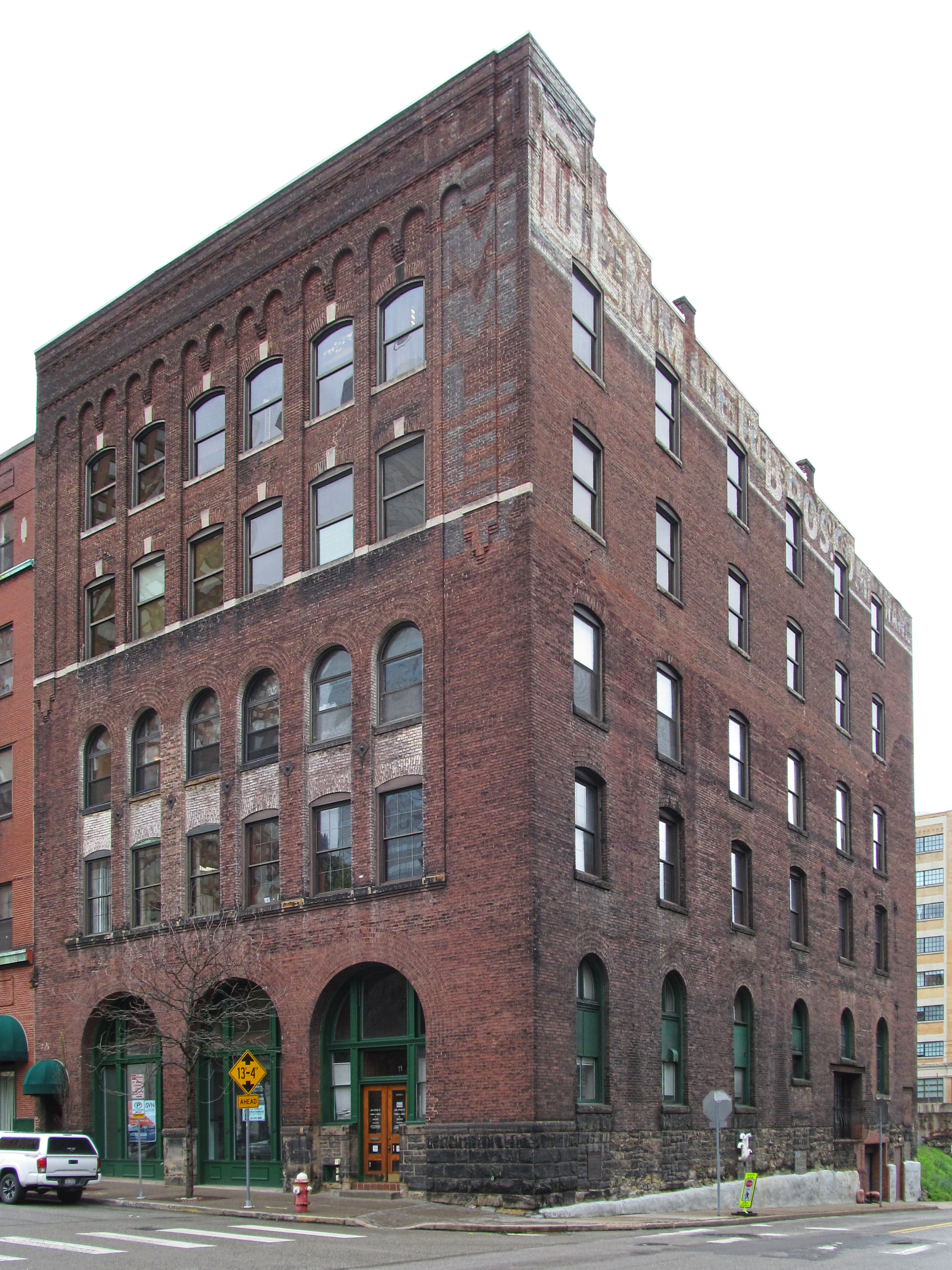
- The building in 2022

- Location within Pittsburgh Location within Pennsylvania Location within the United States
- Location: 100 Ross St., Pittsburgh, Pennsylvania
- Coordinates: 40°26′11″N 79°59′50″W
- Built: 1890, 1925 (annex)
- Architectural style: Romanesque Revival, Commercial (annex)
- NRHP reference No.: 100012777
- Added to NRHP: March 6, 2026

The Demmler Brothers Warehouse is a historic building in Downtown Pittsburgh, Pennsylvania. The building began as a three-story livery stable constructed in 1889–90 by the Pittsburgh Transfer Company. In 1904, it was sold to the Demmler Bros. Company, a hardware and sheet metal business. Demmler Bros. added two floors to the building around 1907, followed by an adjoining annex in 1925. The building was listed on the National Register of Historic Places in 2026.

The 1889–1907 section of the warehouse is a five-story, six-bay Romanesque Revival style brick building on a stone foundation. The ground floor has an arcade with three large arched openings—originally entrances for horses and carts—and one small arched doorway. The annex is a five-story Commercial style building with an asymmetrical stepped parapet concealing a stair tower.

== See also ==
- National Register of Historic Places listings in Pittsburgh, Pennsylvania
