= Lawrenceville (Pittsburgh) =

Coordinates: 40.46525°N 79.96543°W

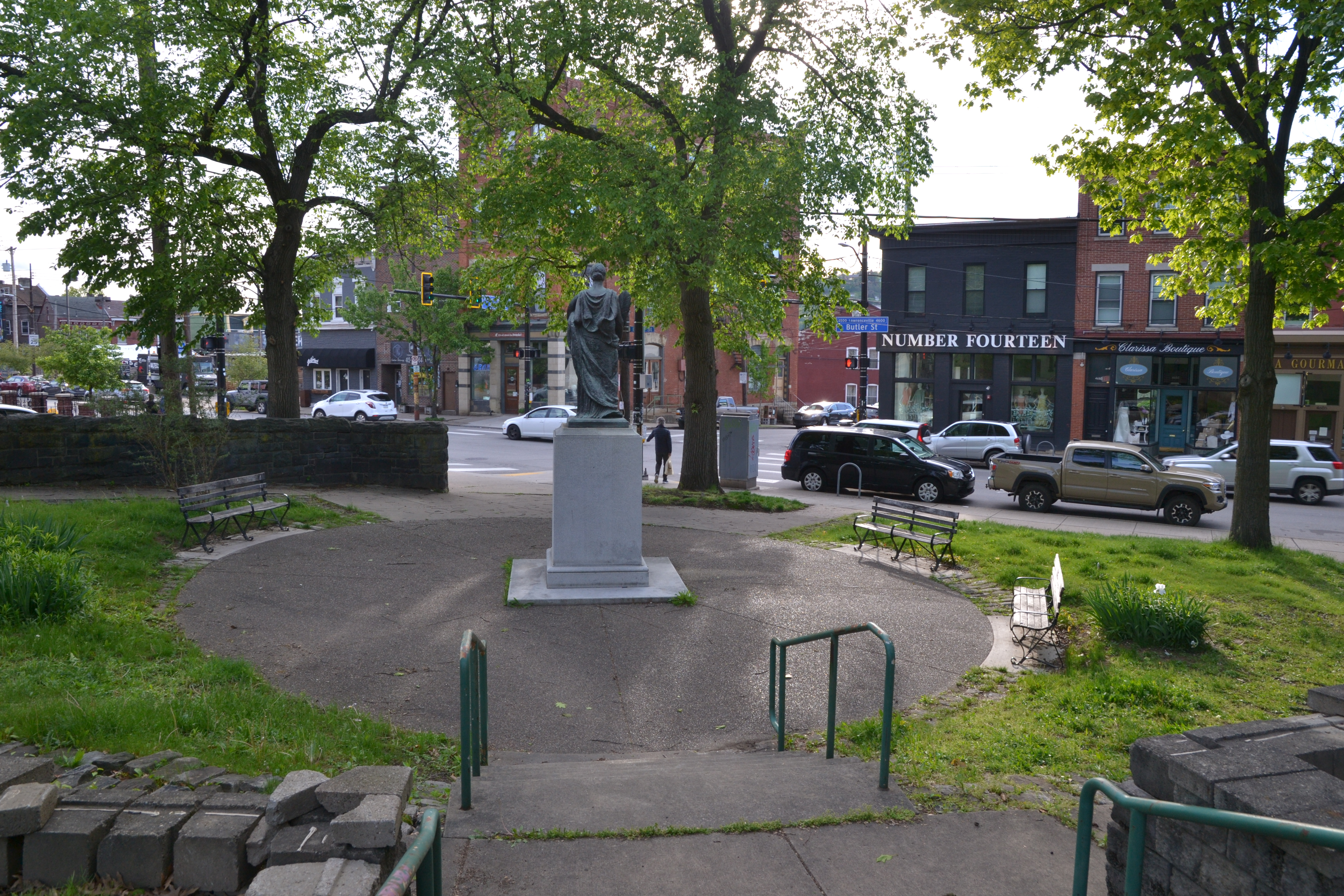
- View of Butler Street from World War I Memorial Park

- Location of Lawrenceville within the city of Pittsburgh
- Country: United States
- State: Pennsylvania
- County: Allegheny County
- City: Pittsburgh
- Founded: 1814
- Incorporated (borough): February 18, 1834
- Annexed (by Pittsburgh): June 30, 1868
- Founder: William B. Foster
- Named for: James Lawrence

Upper Lawrenceville
- Neighborhood of Pittsburgh

Area
  - Total: 1.05 km^{2} (0.405 sq mi)

Population (2010)
  - Total: 2,669
  - Density: 2,540/km^{2} (6,590/sq mi)

Central Lawrenceville
- Neighborhood of Pittsburgh
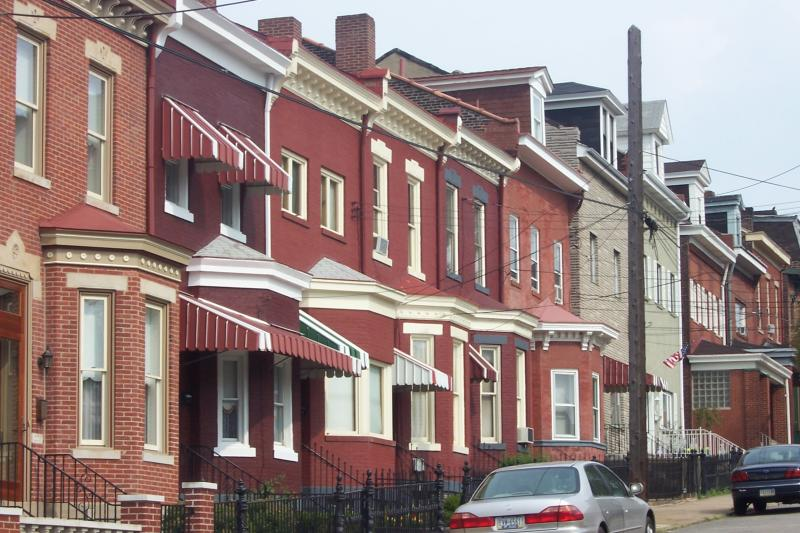
- Row houses are common throughout Lawrenceville.

Area
  - Total: 2.49 km^{2} (0.963 sq mi)

Population (2010)
  - Total: 4,482
  - Density: 1,800/km^{2} (4,650/sq mi)

Lower Lawrenceville
- Neighborhood of Pittsburgh
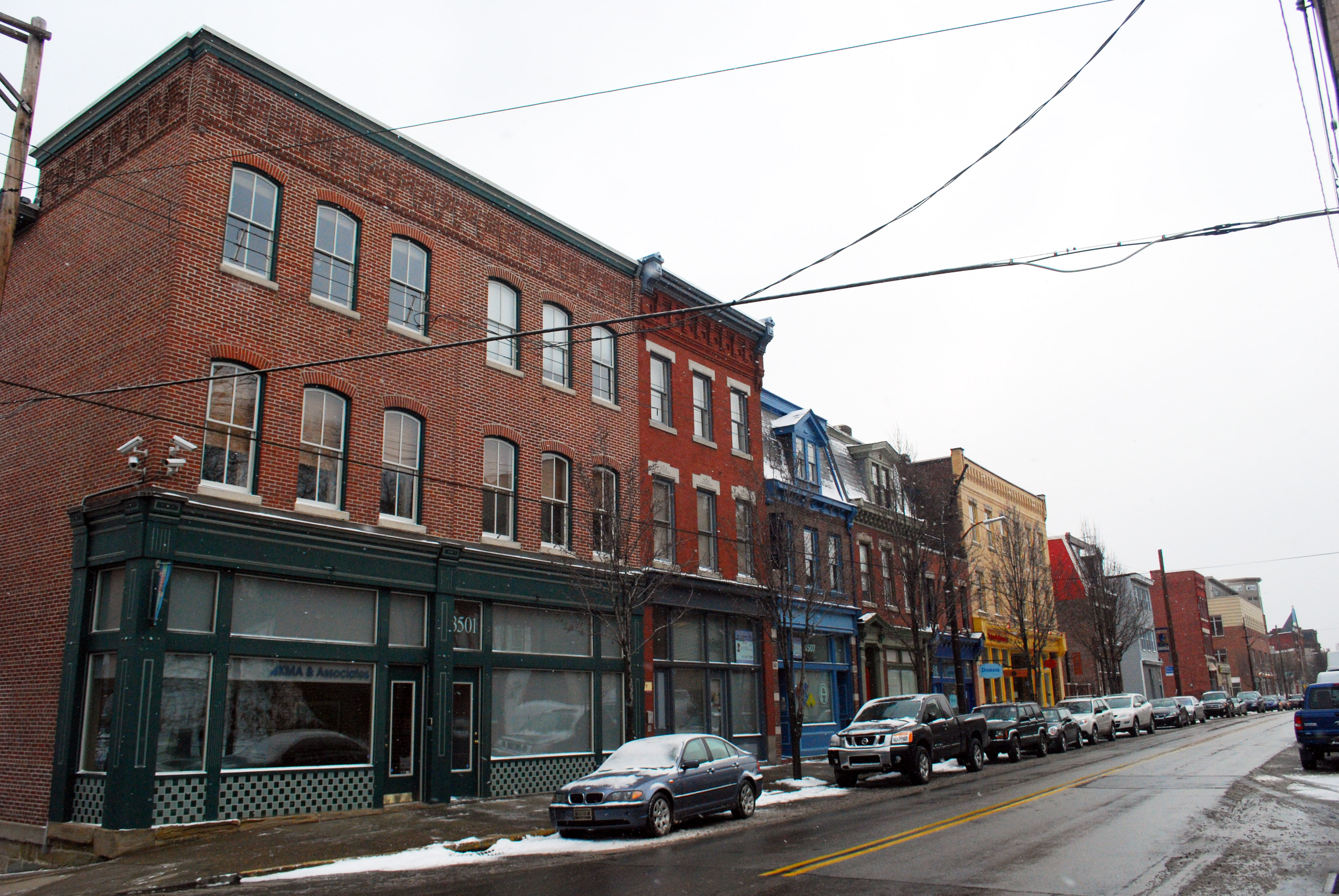
- Shops and professional offices along Butler Street.

Area
  - Total: 1.1 km^{2} (0.43 sq mi)

Population (2010)
  - Total: 2,341
  - Density: 2,100/km^{2} (5,400/sq mi)

Lawrenceville is one of the largest neighborhood areas in Pittsburgh in the U.S. state of Pennsylvania. It is located northeast of downtown, and like many of the city's riverfront neighborhoods, it has an industrial past. The city officially divides Lawrenceville into three neighborhoods, Upper Lawrenceville, Central Lawrenceville, and Lower Lawrenceville, but these distinctions have little practical effect. Accordingly, Lawrenceville is almost universally treated as a single large neighborhood.

In 2019, the Lawrenceville Historic District, which encompasses the majority of the neighborhood, was added to the National Register of Historic Places.

== History ==
Lawrenceville was founded in 1814 by William B. Foster, father of composer Stephen Foster, who was born there in 1826. It is named for Captain James Lawrence, hero of the War of 1812, famous for his dying words, "Don't Give Up The Ship!" Lawrenceville was selected as home to the Allegheny Arsenal, due to "The area's accessibility to river transportation and its proximity to what was then the nation's only iron producing district". Incorporated as a borough on February 18, 1834, Lawrenceville was annexed to the city of Pittsburgh in 1868. One of the original buildings, a log home built in the 1820s, survived until July 2011 at 184 38th Street.

As seen on older maps, two sizable islands once sat opposite Lawrenceville in the Allegheny river: Herrs Island (now known as Washington's Landing), which stretched from roughly 28th street to 37th street, and McCullough's Island (sometimes labeled Wainwright's Island or "Good Liquor" Island), which stretched from roughly 35th street to 40th street. Washington's Landing is named after an event in 1753 in which George Washington was thrown from his raft while crossing the Allegheny River and scrambled to safety on a nearby island. However, Washington did not actually land on Washington's Landing—he landed on McCullough's Island. Although Washington's Landing still exists, McCullough's Island, which sat much closer to the mainland, does not. The channel between McCullough's Island and Lawrenceville was filled in between 1872 and 1882.

== Present ==
Lawrenceville's primary zip code is 15201, though a small section shares 15224 with Bloomfield and Garfield. The neighborhood is home to landmarks such as Allegheny Cemetery, Arsenal Middle School, Arsenal Park, and Doughboy Square. Lawrenceville maintains much of its industrial-era aesthetic, with narrow row houses and old warehouses lining streets and alleyways.

The UPMC Children's Hospital of Pittsburgh opened a new facility in Lawrenceville on May 2, 2009, moving all patients from Oakland. This addition has helped spawn Lawrenceville's transformation, bringing new job and business opportunities to the area. The New York Times has since called the neighborhood a "go-to destination."

Lawrenceville's Butler Street is its main artery, housing a number of restaurants, bars, boutiques, furniture stores, and coffee shops. Arsenal Lanes, a longstanding bowling alley with a full-stocked bar. The Row House Cinema opened in 2014, showing popular classics.

Lawrenceville hosts Pittsburgh's annual Art All Night, an event for amateur artists to showcase their work in a large warehouse, open for free and to the public. In April 2016, the 19th Art All Night event was held in a new location at the Arsenal Terminal Building at 39th and Butler Streets.

Lawrenceville has experienced a real estate boom in recent years. In 2007, price appreciation was the second highest in the city, after the South Side, according to Carnegie Mellon University. In 2015, the Pittsburgh Post-Gazette reported an increasingly high volume of developers looking to Lawrenceville to renovate properties for resale, also known as "flipping" houses, although such opportunities have become less lucrative as prices rise. Many homes now sell upwards of $200,000. As a result of this growth, Lawrenceville is typical of Pittsburgh's gentrification: once a working-class district, the neighborhood now caters to higher-earning buyers. Increases in construction and commercial enterprise have also led to a shortage of street parking, as the car-dependent nature of the built environment leads increasing numbers of people to squeeze their cars into finite space.

Arsenal Park remains a popular recreation spot, hosting July 4 events each year, and the VFW center and Teamster Temple are active.

Lawrenceville was used as a location for some scenes of the film Love & Other Drugs (2010), starring Jake Gyllenhaal and Anne Hathaway.

== Surrounding and adjacent neighborhoods ==
Lower Lawrenceville has four land borders with the Pittsburgh neighborhoods of Central Lawrenceville to the northeast, Bloomfield to the east, Polish Hill to the south, and the Strip District to the southwest. Across the Allegheny River, the Lower neighborhood runs adjacent with the Pittsburgh neighborhood of Troy Hill and Millvale with a direct link to the latter via 40th Street Bridge.

Central Lawrenceville has five land borders with the Pittsburgh neighborhoods of Upper Lawrenceville to the north, Stanton Heights to the east and northeast, Garfield to the southeast, Bloomfield to the south and Lower Lawrenceville to the southwest. Its adjacent neighborhoods across the Allegheny River include Millvale and Shaler Township.

Upper Lawrenceville has three land borders with the Pittsburgh neighborhoods of Morningside to the east, Stanton Heights to the southeast, and Central Lawrenceville to the south and southwest. The Upper section runs adjacent across the Allegheny River with Etna Boro, Sharpsburg and then Shaler Township.

== Notable residents ==
- James Callahan, president and part owner of the National Hockey League's Pittsburgh Pirates.
- Catherine Anne Cesnik (1942-1969), Catholic nun who was murdered
- Robert Craddock, soccer player
- Frank Gorshin, actor
- Sara Innamorato, Allegheny County Executive

== See also ==
- Central Lawrenceville
- List of Pittsburgh neighborhoods
