= Alpha Terrace Historic District =

Historic district in Pennsylvania, United States

- U.S. National Register of Historic Places
- U.S. Historic district
- City of Pittsburgh Historic District
- Pittsburgh Landmark – PHLF
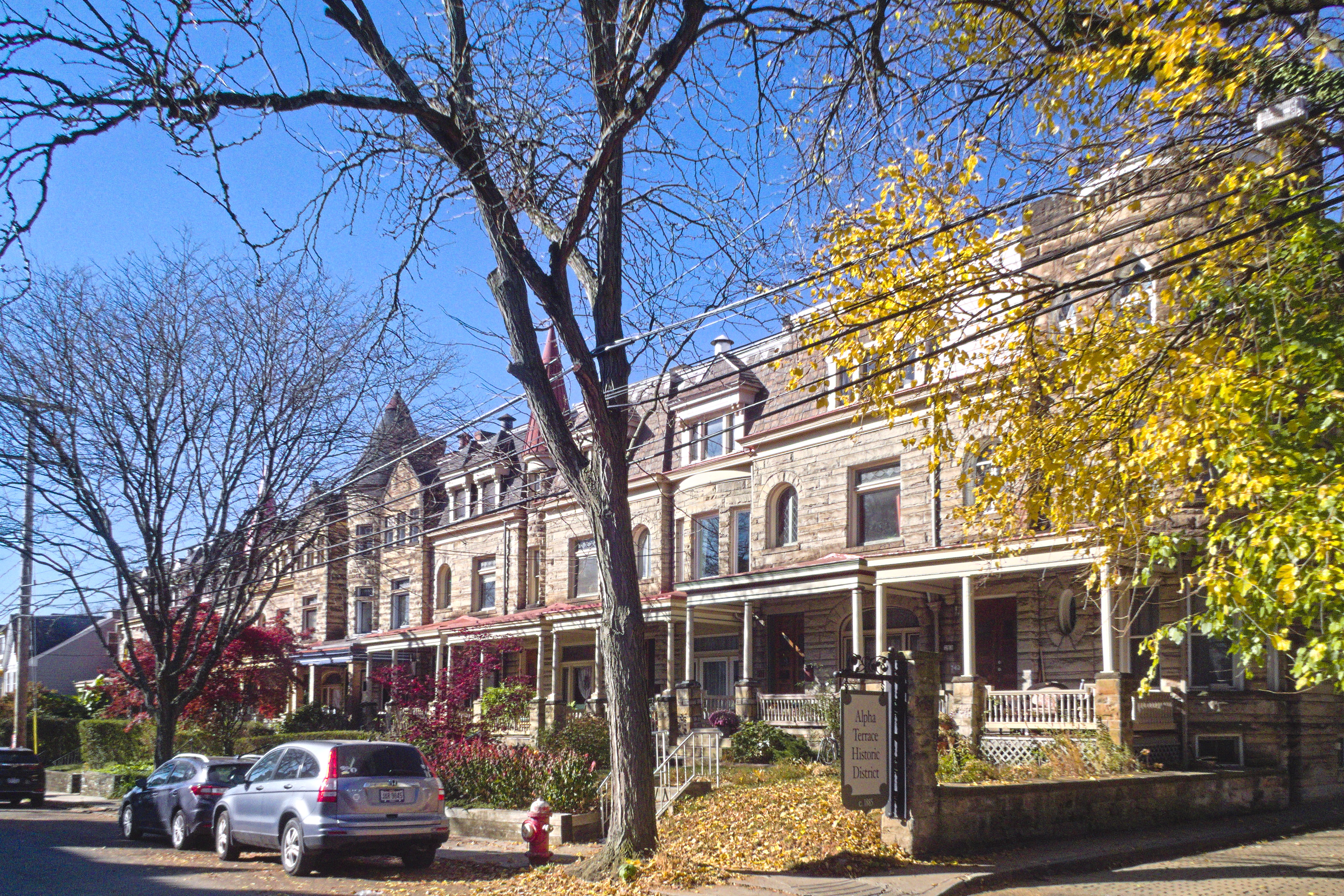
- Alpha Terrace in 2024

- Location within Pennsylvania
- Location: 716–740 and 721–743 North Beatty Street, Pittsburgh, Pennsylvania, USA
- Coordinates: 40°28′9.72″N 79°55′21.55″W
- Architect: Murphy & Hamilton
- Architectural style: Queen Anne, Romanesque Revival, Richardsonian Romanesque
- NRHP reference No.: 85001570

Significant dates
- Added to NRHP: July 18, 1985
- Designated CPHD: January 1996
- Designated PHLF: 1979

The Alpha Terrace Historic District is a historic district in the East Liberty neighborhood of Pittsburgh, Pennsylvania, United States. The site consists of twenty-five stone rowhouses, which were built between 1889 and 1894 using a heterogeneous mix of Queen Anne and Romanesque Revival architectural influences. Until they were subdivided and individually sold in the 1950s, the properties were part of a single block of upper-middle-class rental units; for a time, U.S. Steel leased a number of the homes for use by corporate executives.

The block was listed on the National Register of Historic Places on July 18, 1985. In 1979, it was added to the List of Pittsburgh History and Landmarks Foundation Historic Landmarks, and in January 1996, the district was added to the List of City of Pittsburgh historic designations.
