= Loutellus Apartment Hotel =

- U.S. National Register of Historic Places
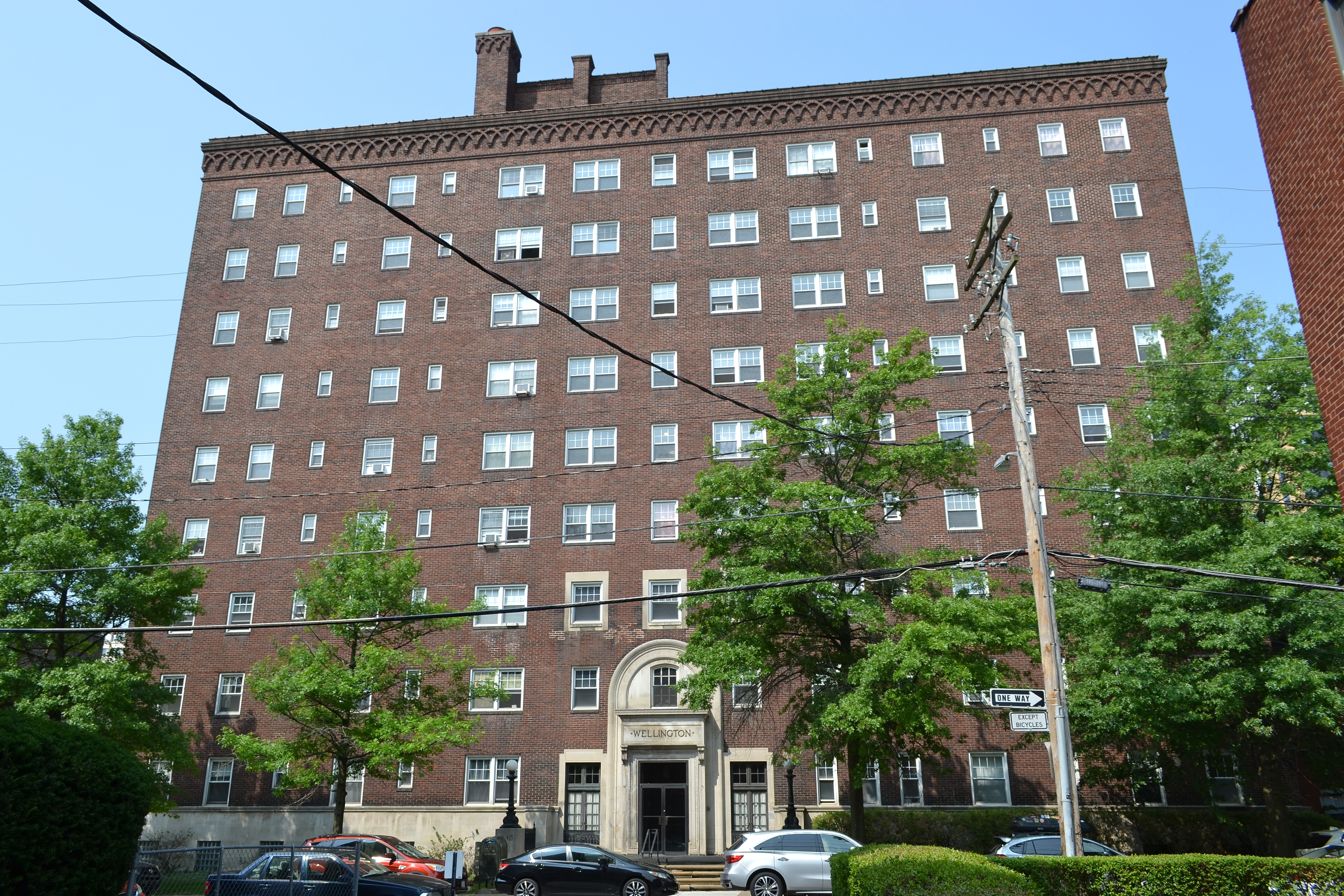
- The building in 2023

- Location within Pittsburgh Location within Pennsylvania Location within the United States
- Location: 231–245 Melwood Ave., Pittsburgh, Pennsylvania
- Coordinates: 40°27′4″N 79°57′1″W
- Built: 1925
- Architect: Henry Hornbostel, Eric Fisher Wood
- Architectural style: Colonial Revival
- NRHP reference No.: 100011109
- Added to NRHP: March 17, 2025

The Loutellus Apartment Hotel, also known as the Wellington Apartments, is a historic apartment building in the North Oakland neighborhood of Pittsburgh, Pennsylvania. It was built in 1925 and was listed on the National Register of Historic Places in 2025.

It is a nine-story brick and limestone building with a raised basement and a two-story penthouse containing laundry facilities. According to the National Register nomination, both the interior and exterior of the building retain a high degree of integrity.
