= Hazelwood Brewing Company =

- U.S. National Register of Historic Places
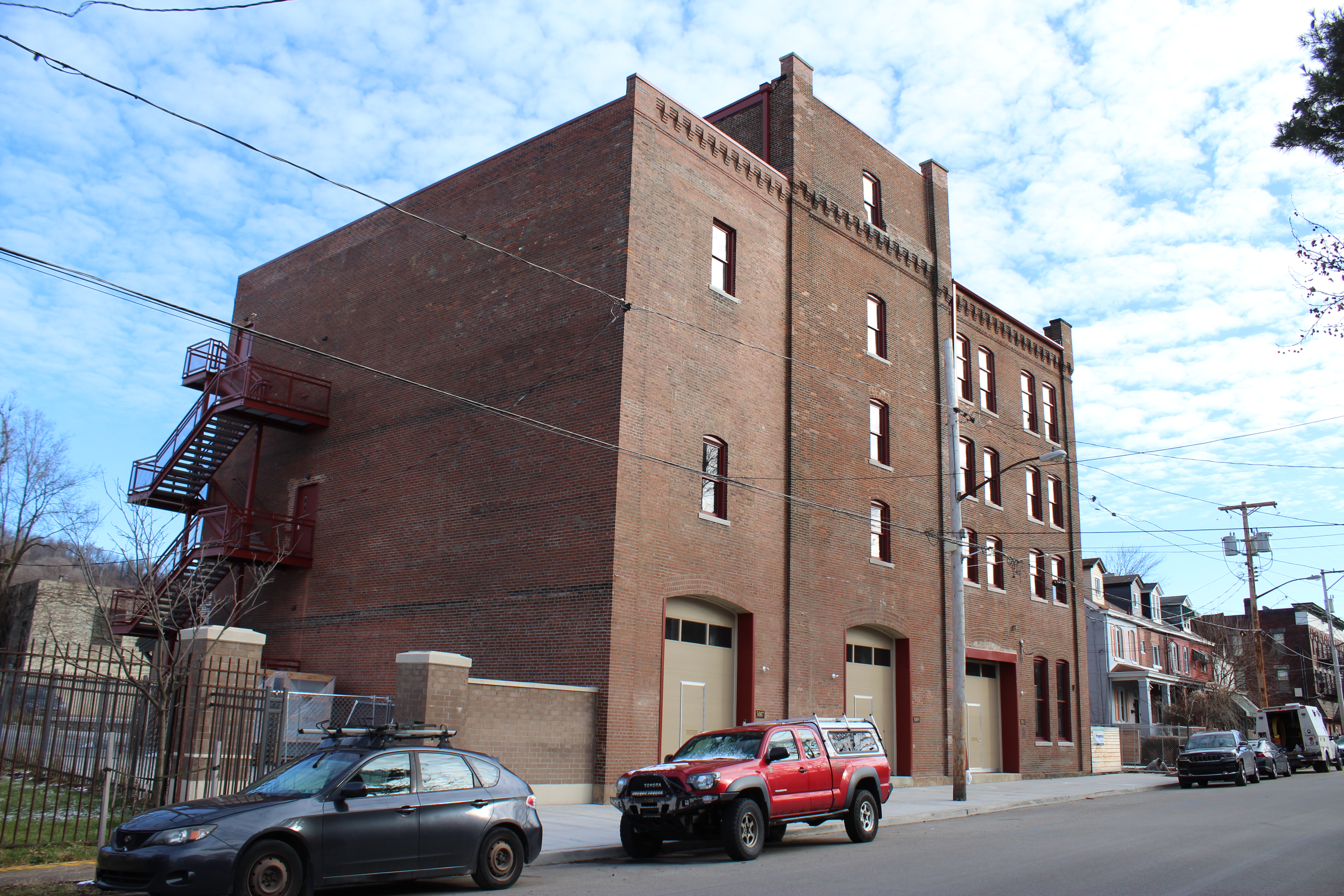
- Hazelwood Brewing Company in 2023

- Location within Pittsburgh Location within Pennsylvania Location within the United States
- Location: 5007–5011 Lytle St.
- Coordinates: 40°24′27″N 79°56′44″W
- Built: 1905
- NRHP reference No.: 100005931
- Added to NRHP: December 21, 2020

The Hazelwood Brewing Company is an historic brewery complex which is located in the Hazelwood neighborhood of Pittsburgh, Pennsylvania.

== History ==
The brewery opened in 1905 with a production capacity of 40,000 barrels per year and distributed its Bohemian, Pilsener, and Famous lagers throughout the region. During Prohibition, the company produced low-alcohol "near-beer," though it was raided several times for allegedly selling actual beer instead. After the end of Prohibition in 1933, the brewery was reorganized as the Hazelwood Beverage Company and then Derby Brewing Company. Derby Brewing went out of business in 1938, after which the brewery buildings were used for various purposes.

In 2017, the then-vacant property was purchased by a nonprofit organization and renovated to return it to brewery use. The renovated brew house is home to three separate breweries which share a common bottling line and beer garden area. The first of the three breweries opened for business in June, 2024.

== Architecture ==
The main brewery building is constructed from brick and has three sections which consist of one, one, and four bays, respectively. The middle section has four stories plus a mezzanine, while the other two sections have three stories and a mezzanine. The southern section originally had a fourth story as well but it was destroyed by a tornado in 1998.

When built, the brewery also included an ice house, bottling building, and office. Part of the ice house is still standing but the other buildings were demolished.
