= Pittsburgh Brass Manufacturing Company Building =

- U.S. National Register of Historic Places
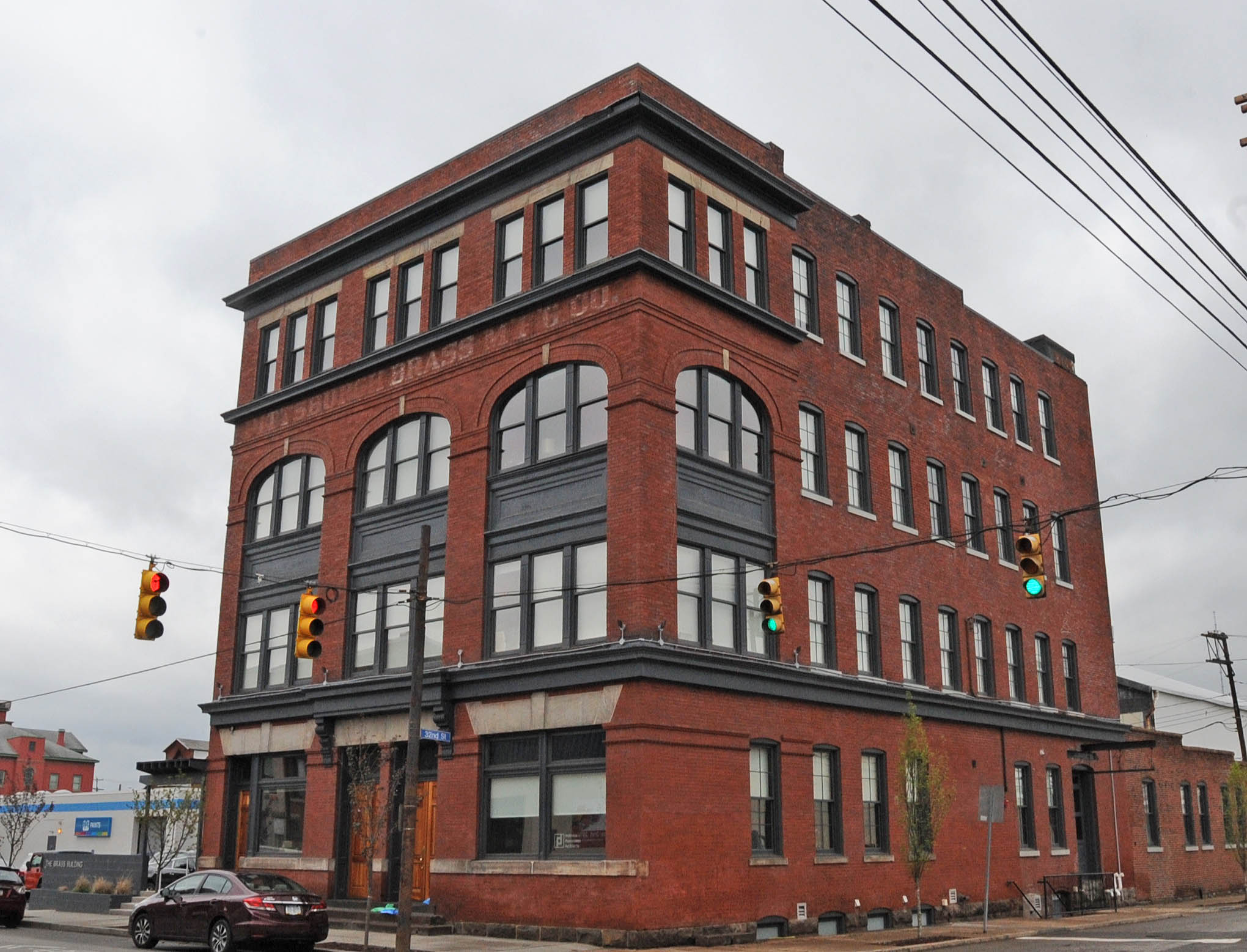
- The building in 2016

- Location within Pittsburgh Location within Pennsylvania Location within the United States
- Location: 3147–3155 Penn Ave. Pittsburgh, Pennsylvania
- Coordinates: 40°27′39″N 79°58′13″W
- Built: 1903
- NRHP reference No.: 15001030
- Added to NRHP: February 2, 2016

The Pittsburgh Brass Manufacturing Company Building is a historic building in the Strip District neighborhood of Pittsburgh, Pennsylvania. It was built in 1903 by the Pittsburgh Brass Manufacturing Company as a production facility for brass and brass goods. The four-story building housed a foundry with coke furnaces for producing raw brass along with casting, rolling, and machining equipment for manufacturing finished products. Pittsburgh Brass used the building until the 1970s, after which it was left vacant for about 40 years. In 2015, the building was renovated and converted into 14 loft apartment units.
