= Morningside (Pittsburgh) =

- Neighborhood of Pittsburgh
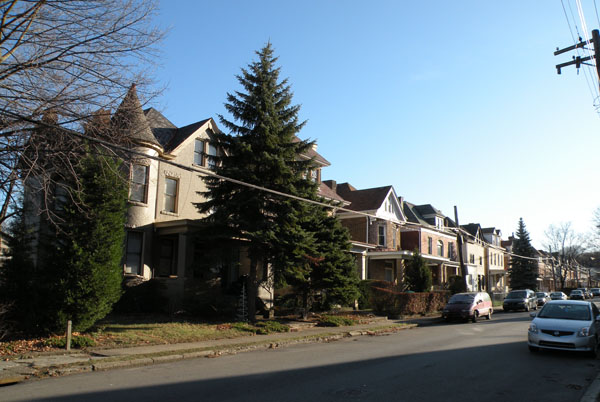
- Near the corner of Chislett Street and Wellesley Avenue.

- Coordinates: 40.484°N 79.928°W
- Country: United States
- State: Pennsylvania
- County: Allegheny County
- City: Pittsburgh

Area
  - Total: 0.362 sq mi (0.94 km^{2})

Population (2010)
  - Total: 3,346
  - Density: 9,240/sq mi (3,570/km^{2})

Morningside is a neighborhood in Pittsburgh, Pennsylvania's East End. It has two Zip Codes, 15201 and 15206.

== Surrounding and adjacent neighborhoods ==
Morningside has four land borders with the Pittsburgh neighborhoods of Highland Park to the east, East Liberty to the south, and Stanton Heights and Upper Lawrenceville to the west. Across the Allegheny River to the north, Morningside runs adjacent with the borough of Sharpsburg.

== History ==
Before the area that encompasses Morningside was annexed as part of the City of Pittsburgh in 1868, it was part of Collins Township. The area was mainly occupied by vegetable and dairy farms, which were run by about a dozen of settler families that ran the farms. The area remained mainly unchanged since its annexation to Pittsburgh until 1905 or 1906. This was the time when the Chislett Street trolley line was extended from Stanton Avenue into the neighborhood, bringing with it many families traveling from the East End/Highland Park towards Fox Chapel and Etna. The area was primed for development, and in a matter of years, upwards of 500 houses per year were being built as the farms were broken up by developers and sold. The neighborhood was fully filled with houses and some small commercial development by the 1930s.

== City steps ==
The Morningside neighborhood has eight distinct flights of city steps. In Morningside, the public stairways in Pittsburgh quickly connect pedestrians to public transportation and provide an easy way to travel through this hilly, populated area.

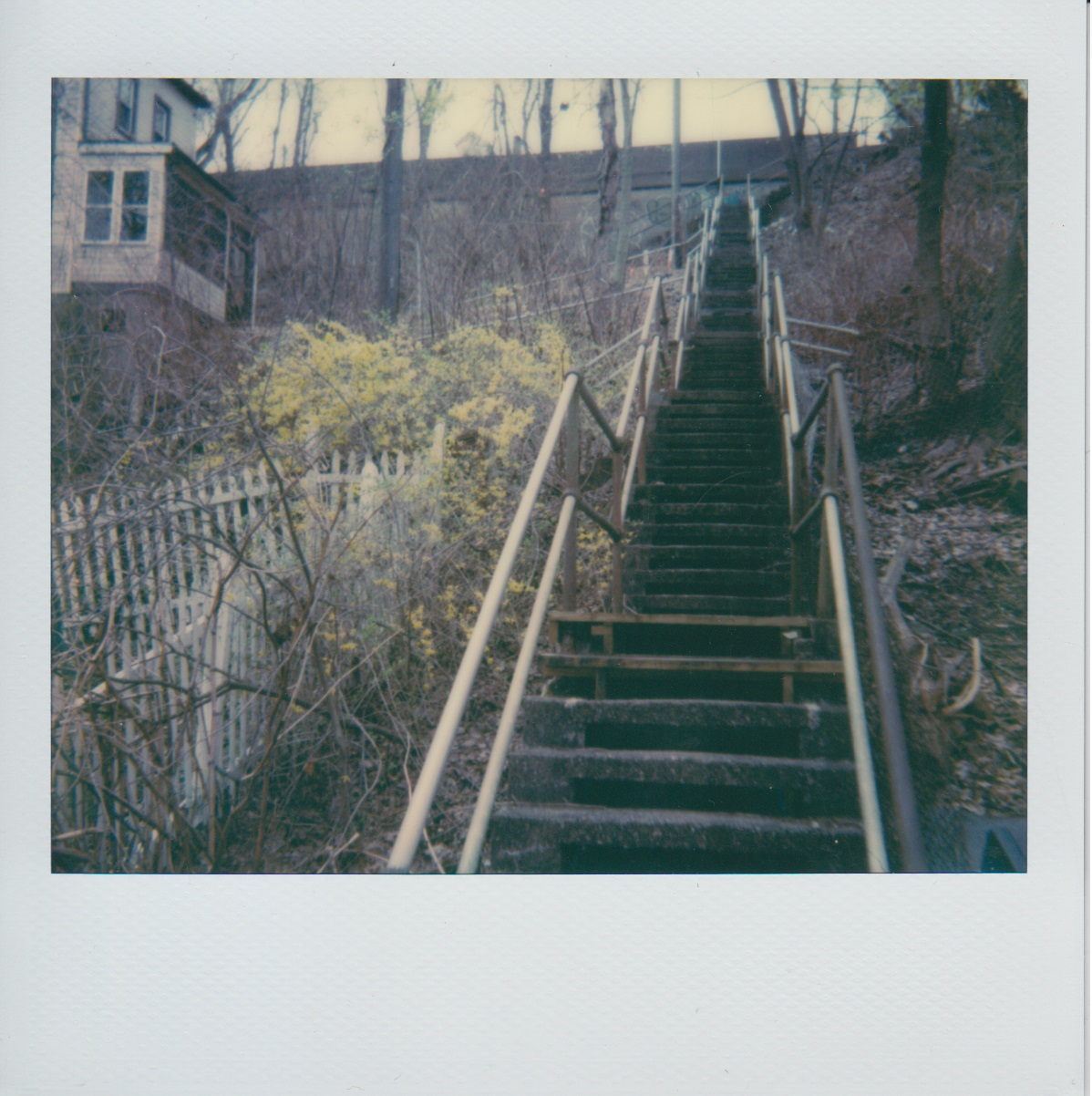
The Jancey Street city steps in Morningside

== See also ==
- List of Pittsburgh neighborhoods
