= Fairfax Apartments =

- U.S. National Register of Historic Places
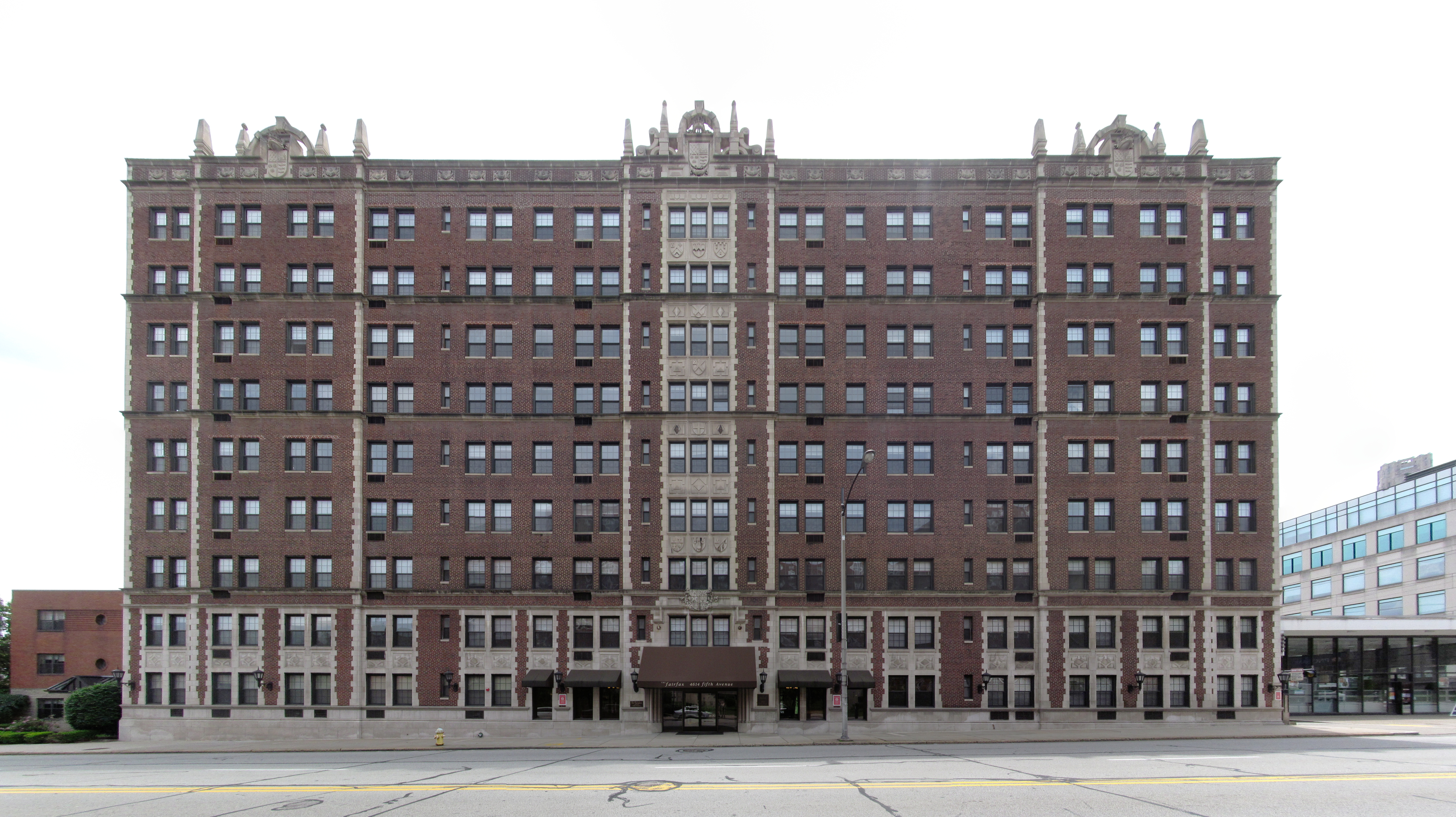
- Fairfax Apartments in 2021

- Location within Pittsburgh Location within Pennsylvania Location within the United States
- Location: 4614 5th Ave. Pittsburgh, Pennsylvania
- Coordinates: 40°26′49″N 79°56′54″W
- Built: 1926–27
- Architect: Philip Morrison Jullien
- Architectural style: Jacobethan Revival
- NRHP reference No.: 100007257
- Added to NRHP: December 29, 2021

The Fairfax Apartments is an historic apartment building in the North Oakland neighborhood of Pittsburgh, Pennsylvania. Built between 1926 and 1927 as the Fifth Avenue Apartments, it was renamed in 1928 after being sold to the Fairfax Hotel Company.

The building was listed on the National Register of Historic Places in 2021.

== History and architectural features ==
The building is nine stories high and consists of a main block facing Fifth Avenue with two perpendicular rear wings. It is faced with brown brick with limestone Jacobethan Revival architectural details including spandrels, quoins, and stringcourses.

The symmetrical front elevation is fifteen bays wide with three slightly projecting sections which are topped with stone finials. The side and rear elevations are less ornamented.

The building contains twenty-seven studio and one-bedroom apartments on each floor, except for the ground floor, which mostly serves as office space.

The building was bought by Carnegie Mellon University and converted into on campus housing around the year 2000.
