= Stanton Heights =

- Neighborhood of Pittsburgh
- Coordinates: 40.480°N 79.938°W
- Country: United States
- State: Pennsylvania
- County: Allegheny County
- City: Pittsburgh

Area
  - Total: 0.735 sq mi (1.90 km^{2})

Population (2010)
  - Total: 4,601
  - Density: 6,260/sq mi (2,420/km^{2})

Stanton Heights is a neighborhood in Pittsburgh, Pennsylvania's East End. It has zip codes of both 15201 and 15206, and has representation on Pittsburgh City Council by the council member for District 7 (Northeast Central Neighborhoods). Stanton Heights is the home of PBF 7 Engine and the city's Arson Investigation Units, and is covered by PBP Zone 5 and the Bureau of EMS Medic 6.

It is a quiet neighborhood with single homes and some duplexes. The homes here are mostly owned and are well kept. There used to be a golf course on most of this site. It is home to Sunnyside School (a Pittsburgh Public School) Stanton Heights has a "Pony" size ball field and playground that sits behind Sunnyside School.

Stanton Heights is located east of Downtown, with convenient access to Highland Park and Liberty Avenue and Butler Street shopping districts. It is surrounded by Lawrenceville, Morningside, East Liberty and Garfield.

The area now known as Stanton Heights wasn't even a city neighborhood just over fifty years ago. Back then, it was a private country club. The result is that this neighborhood, set at the top of Stanton Avenue, with the character of a suburb, has new homes, quiet streets with little to no traffic, and no commercial area at all. Before people lived in Stanton Heights, they farmed and golfed there. Until the mid-1950s, a large portion of the neighborhood was part of the Stanton Heights Golf Course, the largest private course in the city.

While Stanton Heights does not have its own neighborhood business district, residents have plenty of shopping choices nearby. Grocery stores, dry cleaners, hardware stores, and pharmacies can be found in East Liberty, Bloomfield, and Squirrel Hill. A featured event is the Fun Festival held each summer.

== Surrounding Pittsburgh neighborhoods ==
Stanton Heights has five city neighborhood borders with Morningside to the north and east, East Liberty to the southeast, Garfield to the south-southeast, Central Lawrenceville from the south to southwest and Upper Lawrenceville from the west to the north.

== Historical Namesake ==
Stanton Heights is named for Edwin Stanton, US Secretary of War to Abraham Lincoln during the Civil War. Stanton first made a name for himself years earlier as the lawyer who helped to preserve Pittsburgh's position as the hub of the steamboat industry. In 1850 he went before the U.S. Supreme Court to represent Pennsylvania in a case against the Wheeling and Belmont Bridge Company, in which he convinced them that the Wheeling Bridge over the Ohio River should be raised so that steam boats could pass under it to reach Pittsburgh.

== See also ==
- List of Pittsburgh neighborhoods
