= Garfield (Pittsburgh) =

- Neighborhood of Pittsburgh; Former Borough
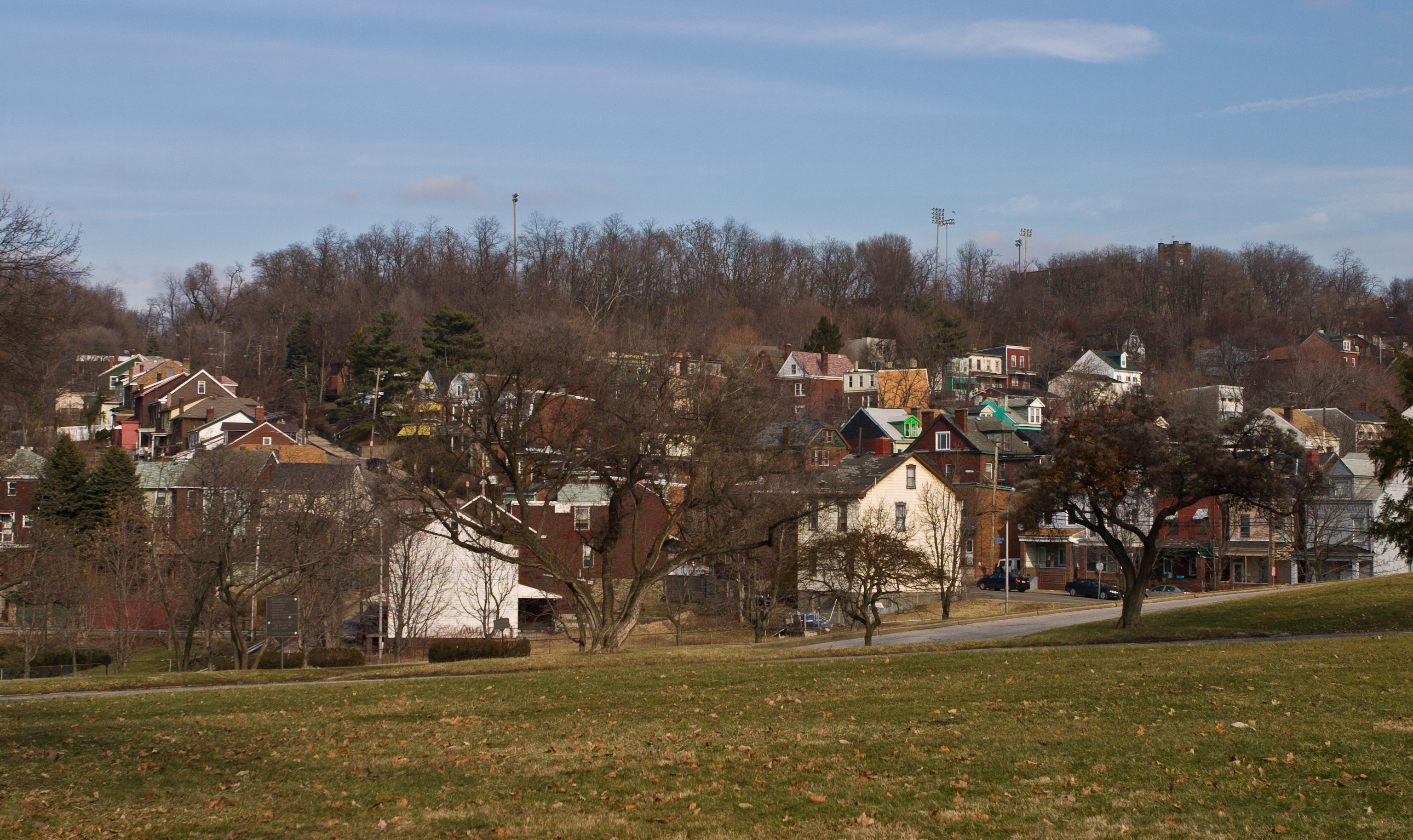
- The western edge of Garfield seen from Allegheny Cemetery

- Coordinates: 40.467°N 79.940°W
- Country: United States
- State: Pennsylvania
- County: Allegheny County
- City: Pittsburgh

Area
  - Total: 0.457 sq mi (1.18 km^{2})

Population (2010)
  - Total: 3,675
  - Density: 8,040/sq mi (3,100/km^{2})

Garfield is a neighborhood in the East End of the City of Pittsburgh, Pennsylvania, United States. Garfield is bordered on the South by Bloomfield and Friendship (at Penn Avenue), on the West by the Allegheny Cemetery (at Mathilda Street), on the North by Stanton Heights (at Mossfield Street), and on the East by East Liberty (at Negley Avenue). Like many parts of Pittsburgh, Garfield is a fairly steep neighborhood, with north–south residential streets running at about a 20% incline from Penn Avenue at the bottom to Mossfield Street at the top. Garfield is divided into “the valley” and “the hilltop.”

Garfield is part of District 9 on the Pittsburgh City Council, and is currently represented by Khari Mosley. There are two schools in the area, ecs middle and now closed fort Pitt elementary.

== City Steps ==
The Garfield neighborhood has 13 distinct flights of city steps - many of which are open and in a safe condition. In Garfield, the public stairways in Pittsburgh quickly connect pedestrians to public transportation and the Penn Avenue business corridor and provide an easy way to access the Fort Pitt Playground and neighborhood parklets.

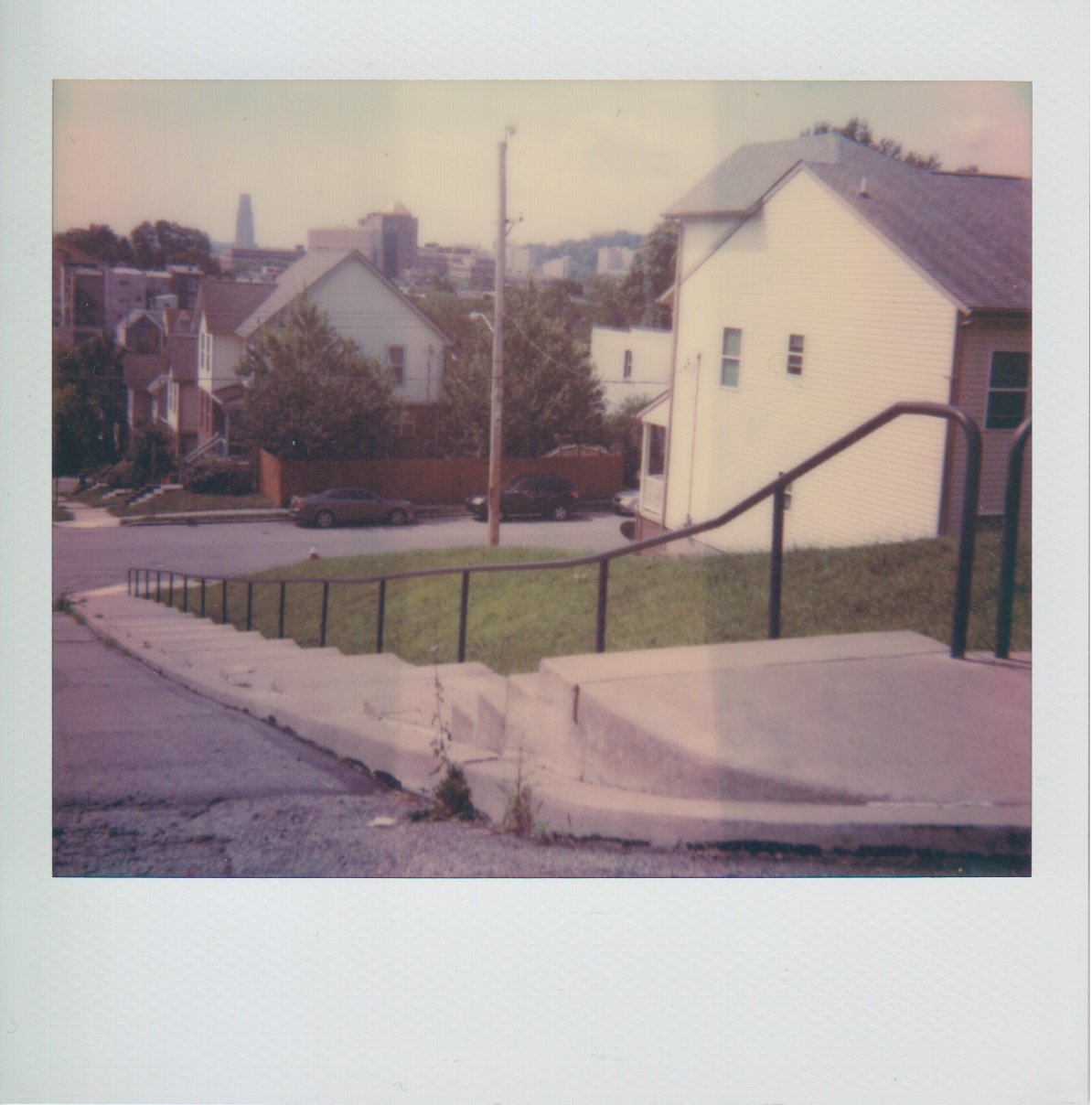
The recently refurbished North Winebiddle Street city steps in Garfield

== History ==
Like nearby Bloomfield and Friendship, the land comprising modern-day Garfield was acquired by Casper Taub from the local Delaware tribe. Taub sold it to his son-in-law, Joseph Conrad Winebiddle, in the late 18th century. About a hundred years later, Winebiddle's descendants broke the family estate into lots and sold them to new residents of an expanding City of Pittsburgh. The first owner of a lot in present-day Garfield bought his plot in 1881, on the day that U.S. President James Garfield was buried, so the neighborhood was named for the late President.

Garfield's earliest settlers were predominantly blue-collar Irish laborers and their families, who worked in the mills and foundries down along the Allegheny River, shopped in local stores on Penn Avenue, and built and lived in modest brick foursquare homes on the streets running up from Penn Avenue. The community, then almost exclusively Catholic, built St. Lawrence O'Toole Parish on Penn Avenue in 1897. From 1880 until about 1960, the neighborhood remained as it began: a solid, working-class area. Neighborhood activist Aggie Brose described Garfield in 1960 as a place where "You sponsored each other's kids, you went to all the weddings and funerals, you never wanted for a baby-sitter, you never had to call a repairman, you didn't need for a social. When you put the kids to bed, the women went out on the stoops."

Things changed in the 1960s, when some Garfield residents began to leave the city for nearby suburbs in Shaler and Penn Hills. In response, the city's Urban Redevelopment Authority (URA) used eminent domain and attempted to change nearby East Liberty from an urban shopping area, then the third-busiest retail center in Pennsylvania, to a suburban one. The URA knocked down many small shops, accessible on foot or by bus, and thereby opened land for larger ones, accessible by car. At the same time, the city's housing authority built several massive public housing complexes on Garfield's borders: Garfield Heights, a 600+ unit complex high up on Fern Street, and the East Mall, a 20+ story tower straddling Penn Avenue at the entrance to East Liberty.

These changes, designed to halt the slow trickle of Garfield residents to the suburbs, instead turned a trickle into a torrent. East Liberty lost most of its businesses, and the new housing projects, inhabited by poor African-Americans, unnerved Garfield residents. In 1969 the federal government gave the City funds to enforce housing codes in Garfield so that as old residents fled, their homes were not allowed to deteriorate. This move also backfired: long-time residents, told that homes built in 1900 (and often passed through families over the years) did not meet codes written in 1960, moved away rather than pay for upgrades.

Thus began a textbook case of white flight: in 1970, Garfield had a population of roughly 10,000 people, 80% of them white. In 2000, Garfield's population had been cut almost in half to 5,450 people, 83% of them black.

To halt what they perceived as the neighborhood's decline, in 1975 parishioners at St. Lawrence O'Toole founded the Bloomfield-Garfield Corporation (BGC), a Community Development Corporation that uses private and government funds and activism to encourage home ownership and business development. Over the years, the organization has built or renovated dozens of housing units, and renovated commercial properties for dozens of small businesses, from restaurants to art galleries to theater companies.

In the 1980s, a similar group called the Garfield Jubilee Association formed, with a goal of creating affordable housing. In recent years, the two groups have joined in a joint project to build dozens of new single-family homes. In 2000, the BGC and Friendship Development Associates, Inc. formed the Penn Avenue Arts Initiative. The PAAI encourages artists to live and work along the Avenue by rehabbing properties, making small loans or grants for facade renovations, and organizing joint marketing events such as Unblurred, held the first Friday of each month, where the venues of Garfield and Friendship open for special events.

Efforts by groups like these, along with a recent recognition that massive, 1960s-style social welfare projects often had negative consequences, have helped to revitalize the neighborhood. Commercially, Penn Avenue is recovering from the flight of local businesses in the 1970s and 1980s. Some bastions of the old neighborhood remain, as groups like the BGC and GJA, and FDA have worked to keep some banks and stores along Penn Avenue. Since 1990, these have been joined by newcomers: African-American barbershops and salons, tiny family-owned Vietnamese restaurants, and a series of arts-related businesses (e.g., theatres, galleries, an architecture studio, a glass factory, a coffeeshop, and much more) attracted by the PAAI.

There has also been some positive residential development: the East Mall and Garfield Heights Senior highrise was razed in 2005, and the townhouse units are scheduled to be demolished in 2007–2008, and replaced with mixed-income units, as well as new replacement homes scattered through the neighborhood. Visitors to Garfield today will see a neighborhood on the rise, a formerly blighted community that is now becoming a community, with a focus on the arts, while not forgetting its roots ().

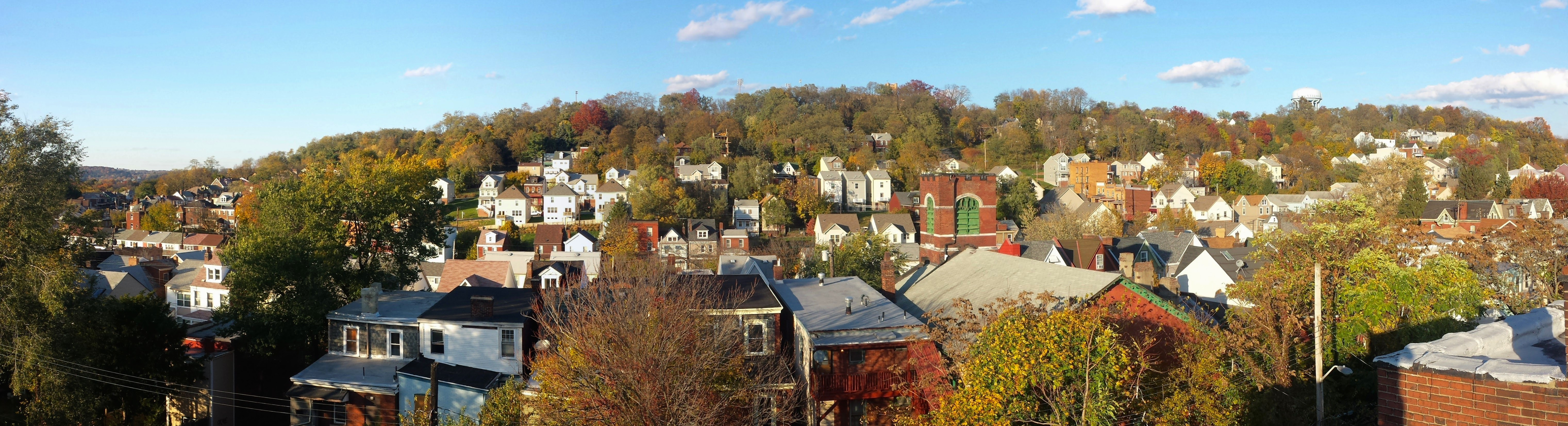
Garfield, as seen from Penn Avenue on its southern border.

== See also ==
- List of Pittsburgh neighborhoods
- Pittsburgh Glass Center
