= Bloomfield (Pittsburgh) =

- Neighborhood of Pittsburgh
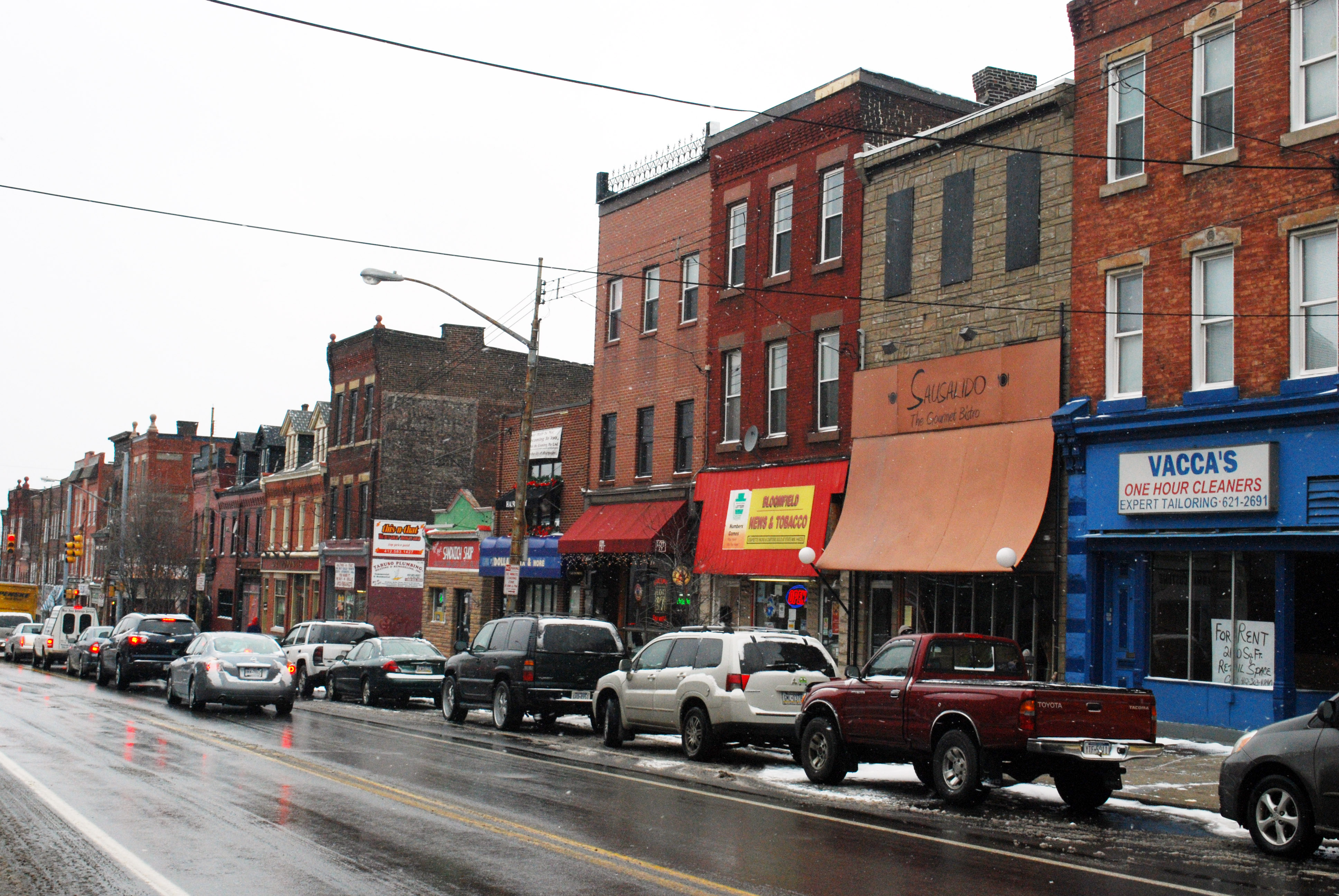
- View of Liberty Avenue in Bloomfield.

- Coordinates: 40.461°N 79.948°W
- Country: United States
- State: Pennsylvania
- County: Allegheny County
- City: Pittsburgh

Area
  - Total: 0.702 sq mi (1.82 km^{2})

Population (2020)
  - Total: 8,665
  - Density: 12,300/sq mi (4,770/km^{2})

Bloomfield is a neighborhood in Pittsburgh, Pennsylvania. It is located three miles from the downtown area. Bloomfield is sometimes referred to as Pittsburgh's Little Italy because it was settled by Italians from the Abruzzi region and has been a center of Italian–American population. Pittsburgh architectural historian Franklin Toker has said that Bloomfield "is a feast, as rich to the eyes as the homemade tortellini and cannoli in its shop windows are to the stomach." Recently, the neighborhood has attracted young adults and college students as a "hip" neighborhood.

Historical population
Year	Pop.	±%
1940	20,708	—
1950	20,074	−3.1%
1960	16,715	−16.7%
1970	14,411	−13.8%
1980	11,761	−18.4%
1990	10,405	−11.5%
2000	9,089	−12.6%
2010	8,442	−7.1%
2020	8,665	+2.6%
Source: University of Pittsburgh

== Location ==
Bloomfield is a plateau above the Allegheny River; it is bordered by Penn Avenue on the north, the East Busway on the south, 40th Street on the west, and Gross Street on the east. This last boundary is somewhat disputed – many residents believe that Bloomfield abuts the neighborhood of Friendship at Gross Street. Here the provincial frame rowhouses give way to stand-alone brick Victorian homes, which were built larger on each street heading east. The City of Pittsburgh, however, claims that Bloomfield extends east as far as Graham Street.

The East Busway is set into Skunk Hollow, a ravine that separates Bloomfield from Polish Hill to the west, North Oakland to the southwest, and Shadyside to the south. The neighborhoods are within sight of one another and are connected by the Bloomfield Bridge and the South Millvale Bridge, both of which span this gap.

== City Steps ==
The Bloomfield neighborhood has 4 distinct flights of city steps - all of which are open and in a safe condition. In Bloomfield, the public stairways in Pittsburgh quickly connect pedestrians from the main residential area to the lower-elevation streets of Lorigan, Juniper, and Neville. These shady streets offer a mix of residential and industrial buildings and are popular with dog walkers, runners, and cyclists.

== History ==
Bloomfield does not appear to have been an independent borough prior to its annexation by the City of Pittsburgh in 1868. Casper Taub sold the land to his son-in-law John Conrad Winebiddle, whose descendants divided it into lots and sold it for development beginning around the time of the 1868 annexation. The community most likely was named for the abundant blooming flowers near the original town site.

In the decades following 1868, Bloomfield was settled by German Catholic immigrants, who in 1886 built St. Joseph's Church. Beginning around 1900, Italians from five towns in the Abruzzi region settled here, forming Immaculate Conception Parish in 1905 (that church was rebuilt in its present form in 1961). Descendants from both groups, with ethnic Italians outnumbering the Germans, still give the neighborhood its character today. In 2001 the national churches of St. Joseph's and Immaculate Conception were merged to form a single parish.

Since the early 21st century, Bloomfield is one of the neighborhoods that has attracted young adults, including those described as creative and "hip." Pittsburgh's affordability and ethnic history, compared to some other cities, have resulted in new residents settling here.

Since 2002 Bloomfield has hosted Little Italy Days, a large annual festival that has become unpopular with some residents.

== Business district ==
The business district is concentrated along Liberty Avenue, with a variety of businesses and services. In addition to the two churches and Western Pennsylvania Hospital, the street has many restaurants and bars, a supermarket and Italian market, tanning and hair salons, a gym, bookstores, barber shops, and more. A small park beside the Bloomfield Bridge holds public bocce courts, a playground, a softball field, a skateboarding area, and a dek hockey rink.

== Sport ==
Baltimore Colts' Hall of Fame quarterback, Pittsburgh native Johnny Unitas returned to this neighborhood to play. After being cut by the Pittsburgh Steelers in 1955, Unitas played one season for the semipro Bloomfield Rams on Dean's Field, located under the Bloomfield Bridge. The semipro league has long since folded, and the Bloomfield Rams no longer exist. The former Dean's Field was renamed as Officer Paul J. Sciullo Memorial Field, after a policeman killed in the line of duty. It is now part of a public recreational complex.

== Images ==
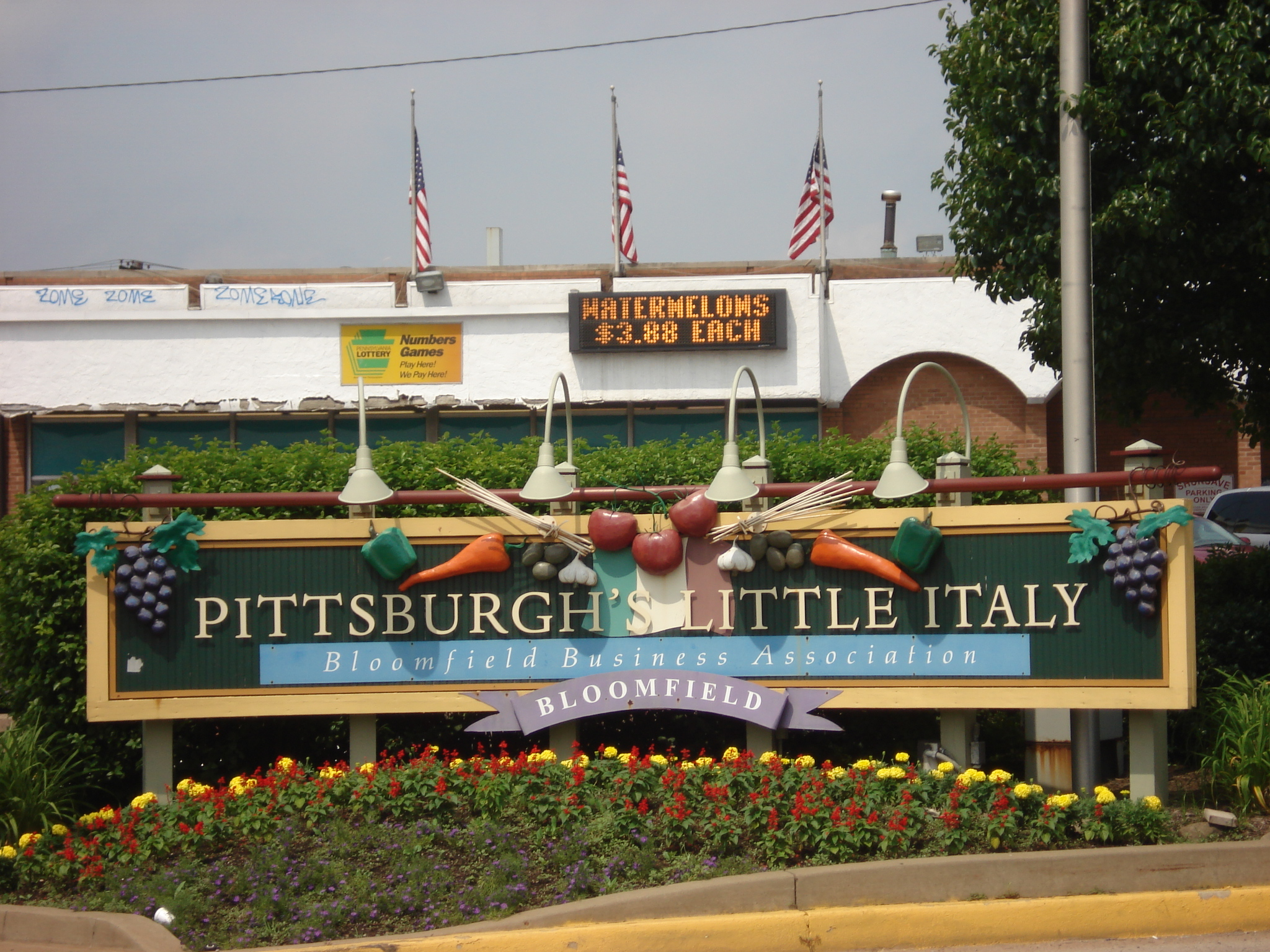
Signage on Liberty Avenue

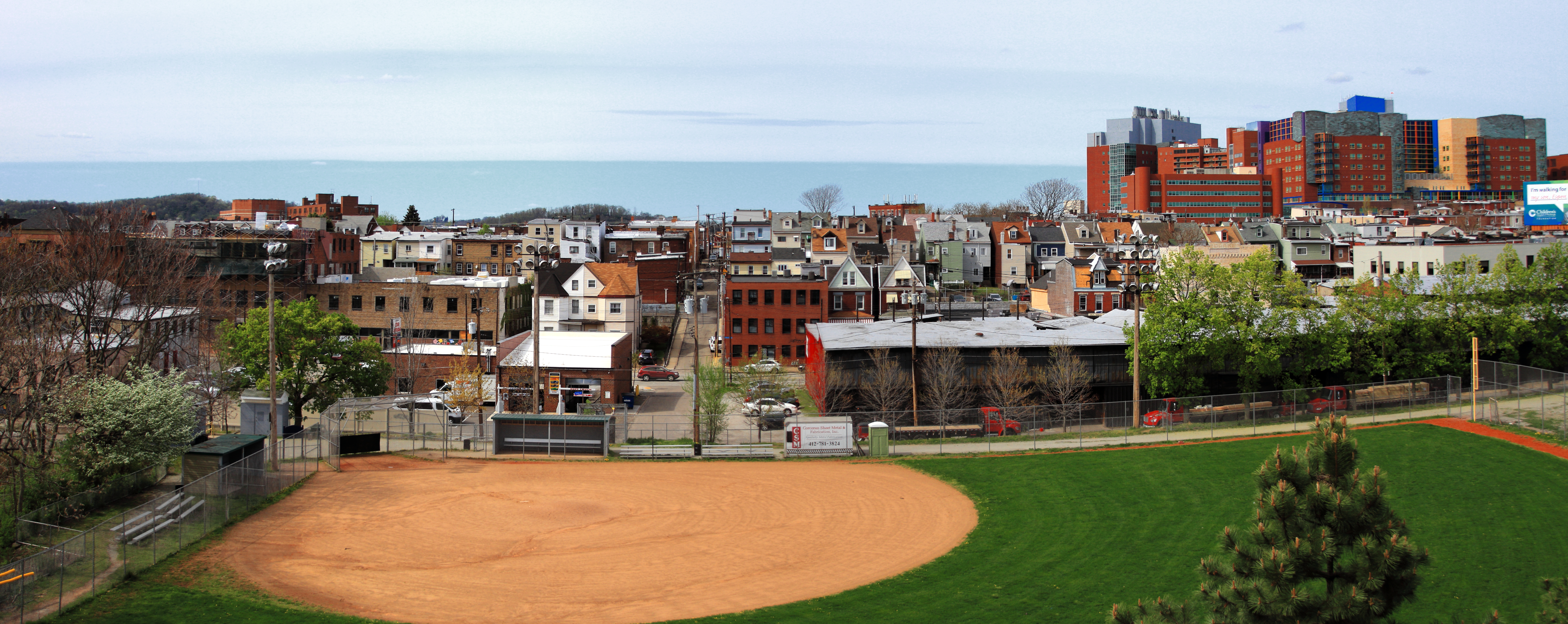
Baseball field in the foreground, with residential dwellings in the center of the image, and the Children's Hospital of Pittsburgh in the background

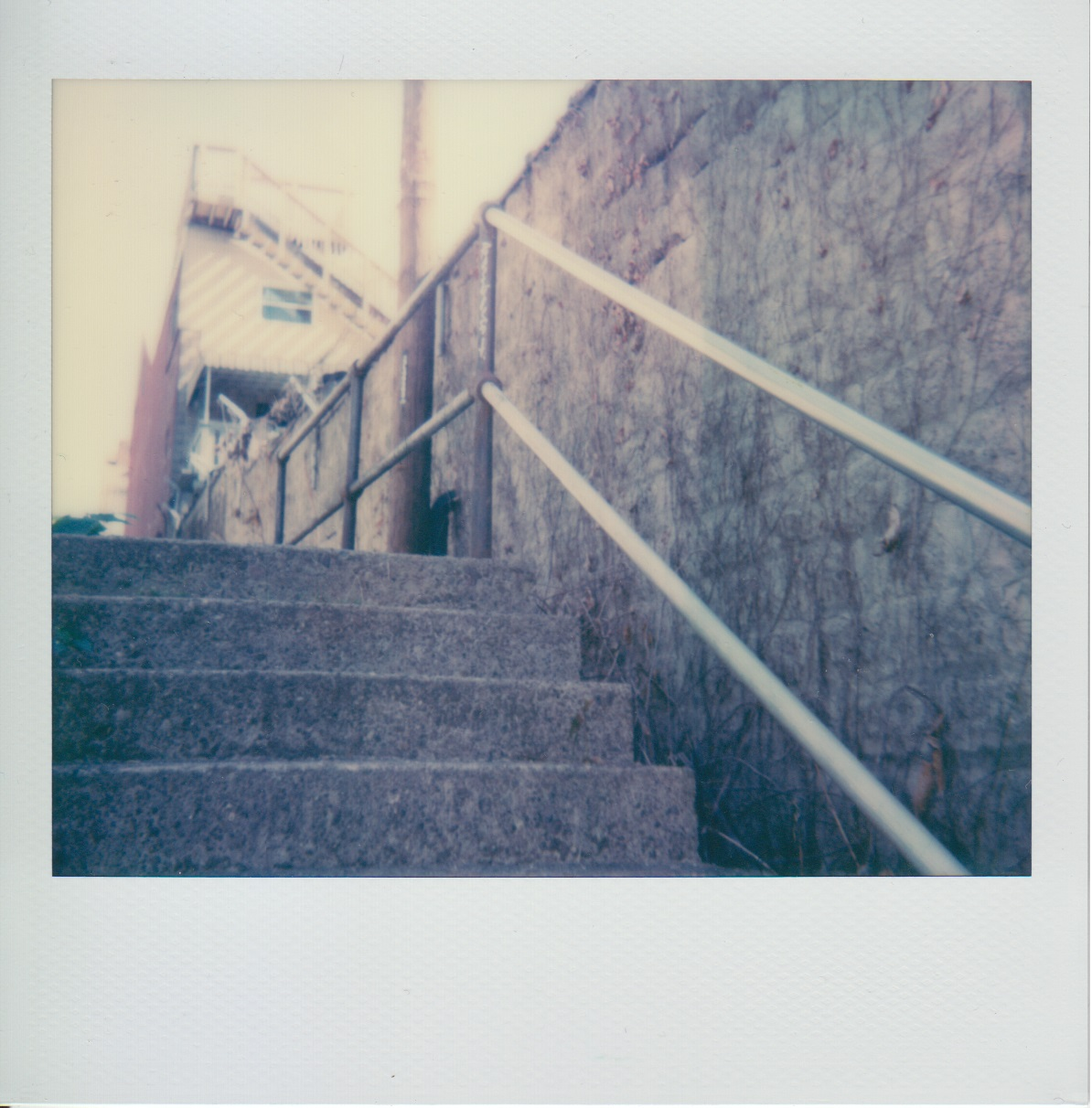
The Cedarville Street city steps in the Bloomfield neighborhood of Pittsburgh

== See also ==
- List of Pittsburgh neighborhoods
