= Butler Street =

Street in Pittsburgh, Pennsylvania

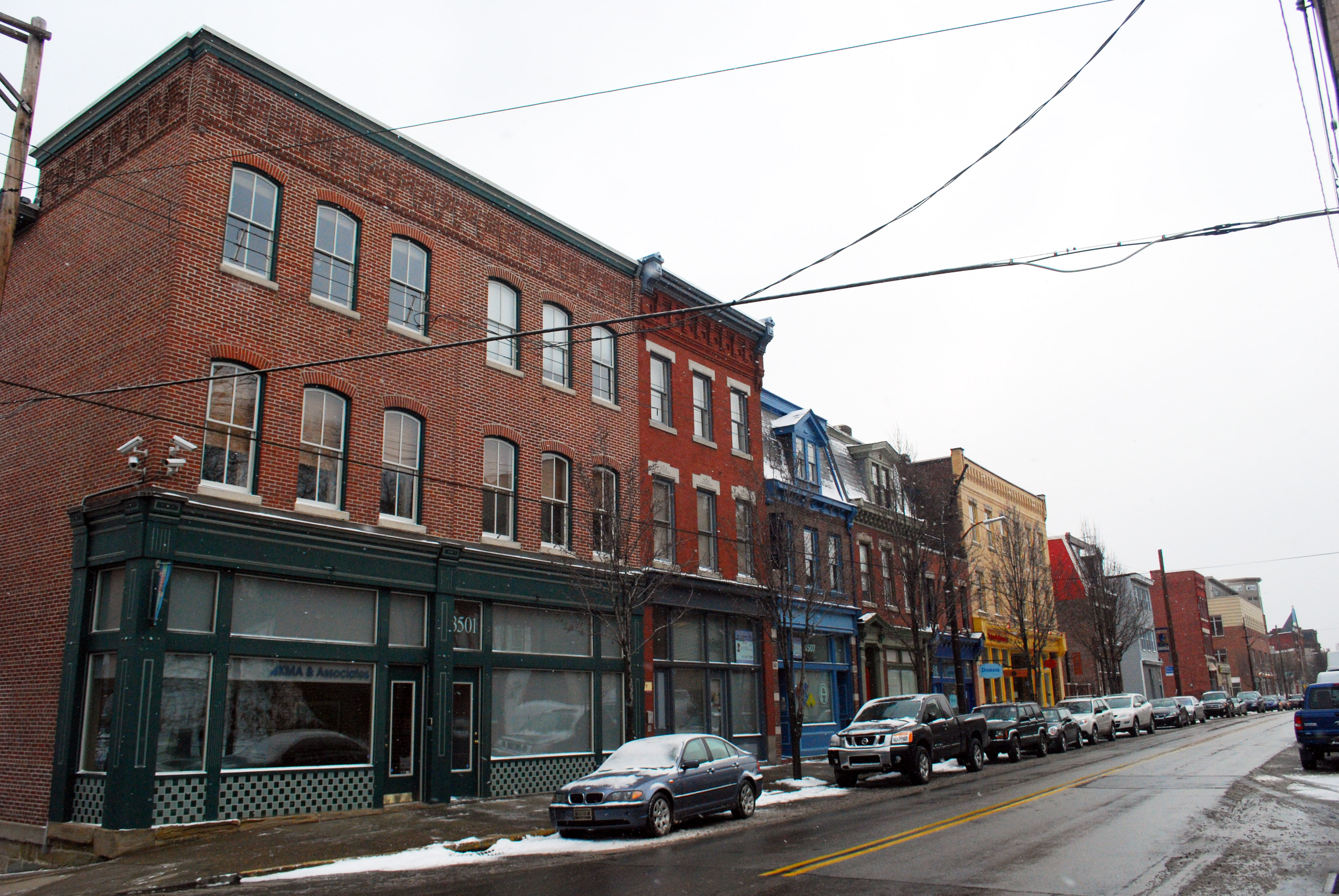
- Butler St. at 35th St. in Lower Lawrenceville
- Interactive map of Butler Street
- Length: 3.8 mi (6.1 km)
- Location: Pittsburgh, Pennsylvania
- Coordinates: 40°28′27″N 79°57′28″W
- West end: Penn Avenue
- Major junctions: PA 8
- East end: Highland Park Bridge

Butler Street is a street in Pittsburgh, Pennsylvania which is the main commercial thoroughfare of the Lawrenceville neighborhood. Since the early 2000s, it has become a center for arts, dining, and music, with many local businesses including bars, restaurants, breweries, and specialty shops. It is named for the city of Butler, Pennsylvania, whose namesake was Maj. Gen. Richard Butler of the Continental Army.

== Route ==
Butler Street begins at Doughboy Square in Lower Lawrenceville, where it splits off from Penn Avenue. From here it runs parallel to the Allegheny River through Central and Upper Lawrenceville and then Morningside before terminating at the Highland Park Bridge. The roadway continues to the east as Washington Boulevard and then Pennsylvania Route 130 (Allegheny River Boulevard). The section of Butler between the 62nd Street Bridge and Highland Park Bridge is part of Pennsylvania Route 8. The street also has an important intersection at 40th Street, providing access to the 40th Street Bridge.

== History ==
What is now Butler Street was originally part of the old road from Pittsburgh to Butler, Pennsylvania, simply known as the Butler Road. The road split from the Philadelphia Road (now Penn Avenue) at a spot often referred to as "the forks of the road", which later became Doughboy Square. It crossed the Allegheny River at present-day Sharpsburg and followed the approximate route of present-day Pennsylvania Route 8 northward. In 1814, the Allegheny Arsenal and its adjacent community of Lawrenceville were established just north of the forks. Butler Street became increasingly urbanized in the late 19th century as Lawrenceville grew from about 200 residents in 1826 to 33,000 in 1900. The street was lined with mostly two- and three-story brick buildings housing a variety of small shops.

Lawrenceville remained a vibrant blue-collar neighborhood until the 1960s, when it began to be affected by a declining industrial base. By the 1990s, Butler Street was "tired-looking" and its businesses were struggling, with the street best known to Pittsburgh residents for its crippling traffic jams. However, beginning in the early 2000s, Lawrenceville began to attract an increasing number of younger residents and Butler Street has been revitalized with a large variety of new businesses, including specialty shops, bars, restaurants, and breweries. It is now considered a center of the arts, dining, and music scenes in Western Pennsylvania.

== Notable places ==
- Doughboy Square - Butler St. and Penn Ave.
- Pennsylvania National Bank Building - 3400 Butler St.
- Pittsburgh Wash House and Public Baths Building - 3495 Butler St.
- Arsenal Middle School - 220 40th St. at Butler
- Naser's Tavern - 4025–4029 Butler St.
- Boys' Club of Pittsburgh - 212 45th St. at Butler
- Allegheny Cemetery, including the Butler Street Gatehouse - 4734 Butler St.
- Hunter Saw & Machine Company - 5648–5688 Butler St.
