= Hunter Saw & Machine Company =

- U.S. National Register of Historic Places
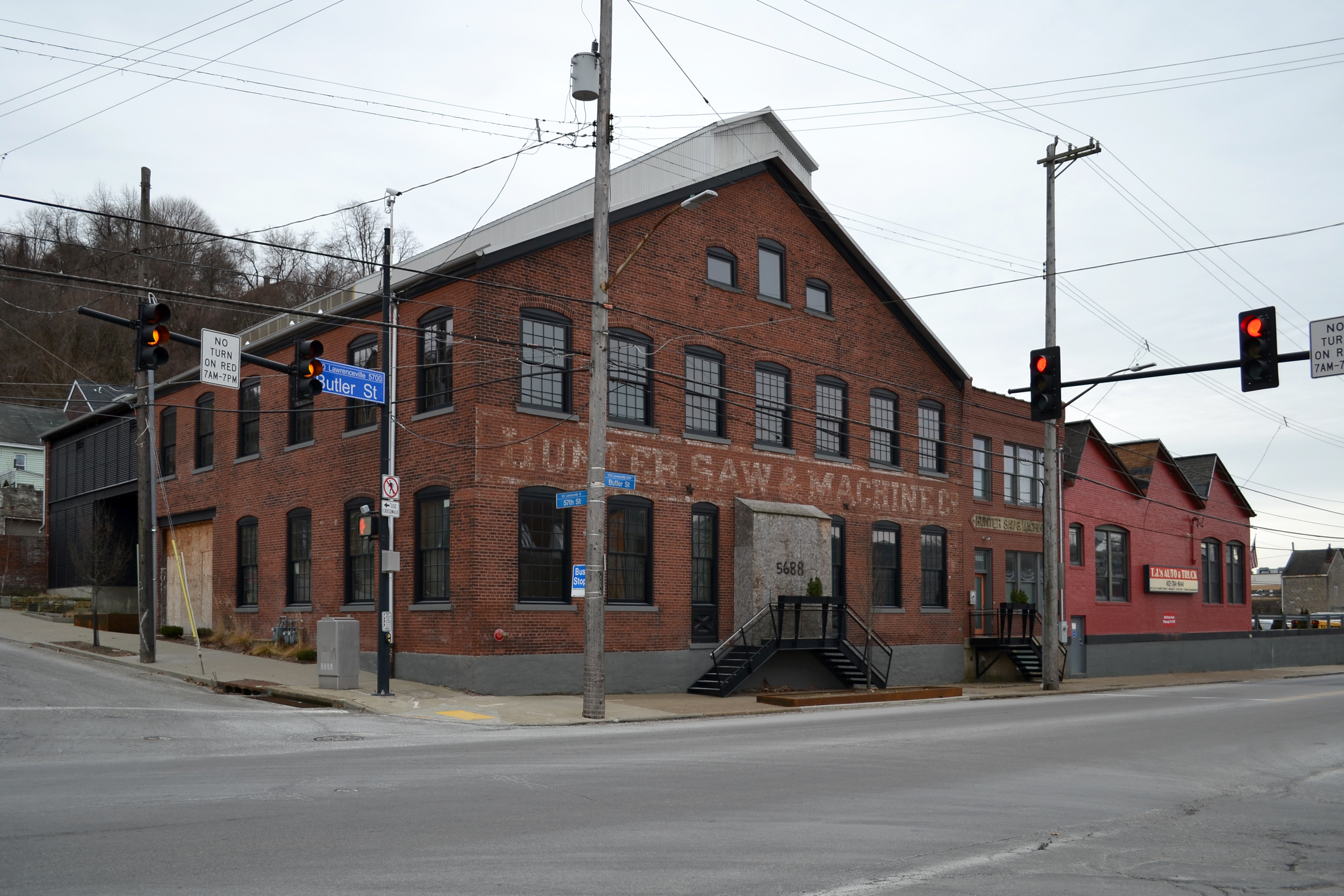
- Hunter Saw & Machine Company in 2021

- Location within Pittsburgh Location within Pennsylvania Location within the United States
- Location: 5648-5688 Butler St.
- Coordinates: 40°29′06″N 79°56′48″W
- Built: 1907–1945
- NRHP reference No.: 100005985
- Added to NRHP: January 7, 2021

The Hunter Saw & Machine Company is an historic former industrial property that is located in the Lawrenceville neighborhood of Pittsburgh, Pennsylvania. It is situated on Butler Street and 57th Street, just outside of the Lawrenceville Historic District.

== History and architectural features ==
The property is a complex of four buildings which date to between 1907 and approximately 1945. They served as the headquarters and manufacturing facility of the Hunter Saw & Machine Company, which produced various custom tools and machinery with a specialty in cold saws. The company was founded in 1898 by Henry S. Hunter, Joseph Kennedy, and Emil Anschuetz, and remained in business until 1969 when it was bought out by a competitor, ASKO. The Lawrenceville plant continued to operate until 1988. As of 2021, the buildings have been renovated as office, commercial, and residential space.

The easternmost building at the corner of Butler and 57th is Machine Shop A, which is the original section of the plant built in 1907. It is a two-story building, seven bays wide by six bays deep, with a front-gabled monitor roof. The building is of heavy timber-frame construction with a brick exterior and has a steel-framed shed addition at its rear that was erected sometime around 1910. To the west is a small two-story, two-bay brick office building which was built circa 1915. A restroom structure behind the office collapsed and was converted into a small courtyard. On the other side of the office is Machine Shop B, which was built around 1920. It is a one-story, four-bay, brick building with a sawtooth roof. Further west is a storage and shipping building of steel-frame and concrete construction that was erected circa 1945.
