= Allegheny High School =

- U.S. National Register of Historic Places
- City of Pittsburgh Historic Structure
- Pittsburgh Landmark – PHLF
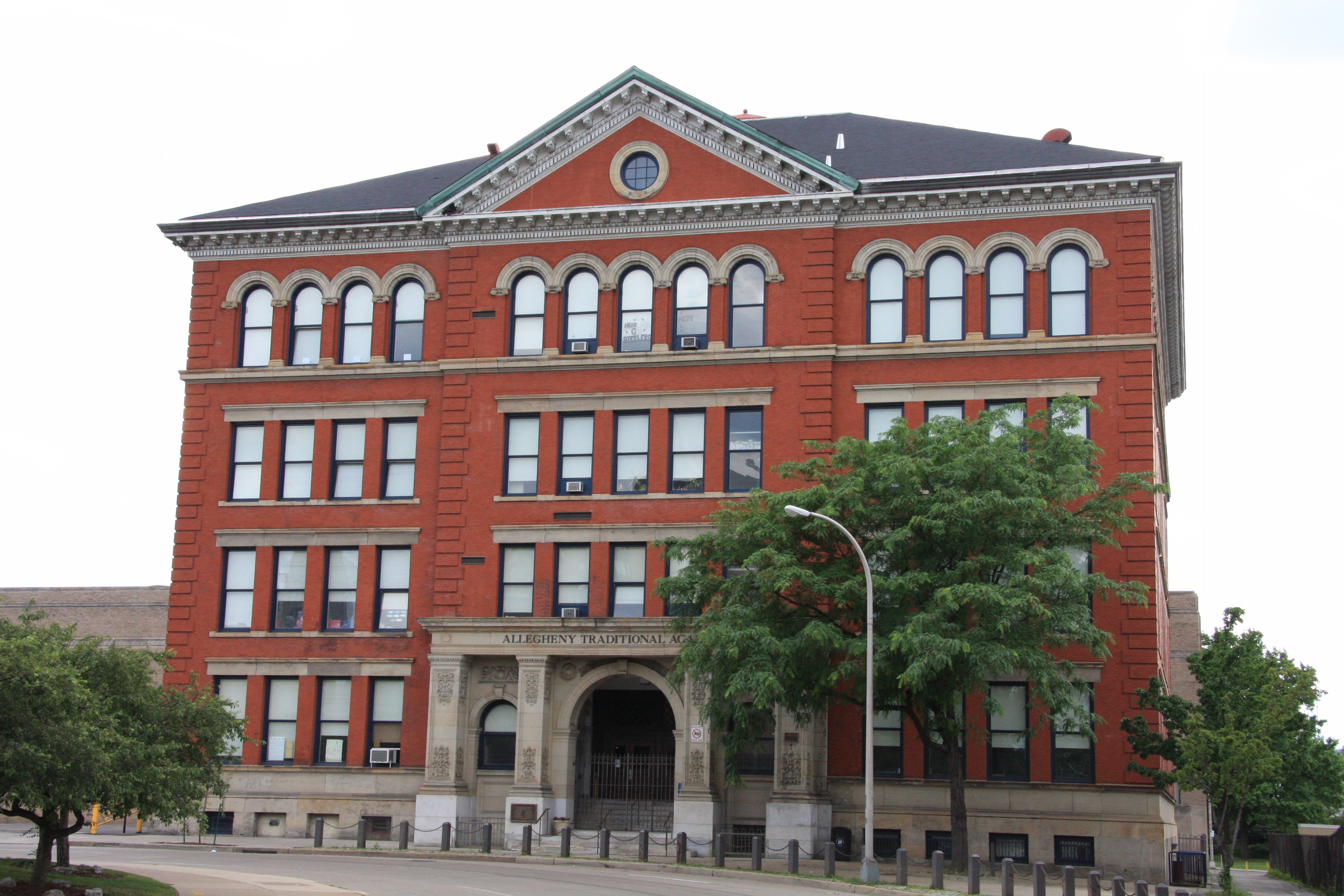
- 1904 "annex" building

- Location within Pittsburgh Location within Pennsylvania Location within the United States
- Location: 220 W. Commons St., Pittsburgh, Pennsylvania
- Coordinates: 40°27′11″N 80°0′32″W
- Area: 3 acres (1.2 ha)
- Built: 1904
- Architect: Frederick J. Osterling; Marion M. Steen
- Architectural style: Classical Revival, Art Deco
- MPS: Pittsburgh Public Schools TR
- NRHP reference No.: 86002643

Significant dates
- Added to NRHP: September 30, 1986
- Designated CPHS: March 15, 1974
- Designated PHLF: 1992

Allegheny High School (now known as Pittsburgh Allegheny PK-5 and Pittsburgh Allegheny 6-8 Traditional Academy) is a public magnet school and former high school in the Allegheny Center neighborhood of Pittsburgh, Pennsylvania, which operated from 1883 to 1983. The school's two surviving buildings were listed on the National Register of Historic Places in 1986.

Notable Allegheny High graduates include William N. Robson, award-winning writer, director, and producer from the old-time radio era and Dorothy Mae Richardson, an African American community activist whose work was essential to the founding of the Neighborhood Reinvestment Corporation.

American novelist Willa Cather taught English and Latin at Allegheny High School, where she came to head the English department.

== History ==
Allegheny High School opened in 1883 as the sole high school serving what was then the independent city of Allegheny. In 1889, the original frame schoolhouse was replaced with a much larger brick and stone building designed by Frederick J. Osterling. An annex, also designed by Osterling, was added to the original building in 1904. The high school, along with all other schools in the Allegheny City district, became part of Pittsburgh Public Schools in 1911.

In 1936, the original 1889 school building was replaced by a new Art-Deco-style structure designed by Marion M. Steen. By the 1970s, the school, then with an enrollment of 1,200, was reportedly troubled by racial tension, low academic standards, and "debilitating apathy". Amid declining high school enrollment across the district, Pittsburgh Public Schools closed Allegheny High in 1983 and converted it into a middle school.

In 1999, the school district reorganized several schools on the North Side, turning Allegheny Middle School into a Traditional Academy magnet school with two separate programs for elementary (PreK–5) and middle grade (6–8) students. This arrangement continues as of 2025.
