= Homewise =

Name of two different organizations in the US and the UK

Homewise (US) is a non-profit organization headquartered in Santa Fe, New Mexico that aims to help moderate income residents purchase homes.

== History ==
The group was founded in 1986 under the name Neighborhood Housing Services of Santa Fe. The organization originally focused on home improvement and rehabilitation, but after Michael Loftin became the executive director in 1992, they branched out to cover all aspects of home ownership.

In 2012, Homewise opened an additional branch in Albuquerque, NM. They have also consulted with similar agency in other cities such as Portland, Oregon and Charlotte, North Carolina.

== Activities ==
Homewise runs classes for those hoping to purchase and finance homes, provides lending services, and has both real estate agents and brokers.

== Funding ==
Homewise is funded in part by grants from national and local organizations, including the Ford Foundation, the John D. and Catherine T. MacArthur Foundation, Calvert Foundation, Los Alamos National Laboratory Foundation, McCune Charitable Foundation, NeighborWorks America, Domanica Foundation, the Wachovia Foundation and the United States Department of Housing and Urban Development.
