= Concord Elementary School (Pittsburgh) =

Former school in Pennsylvania, United States

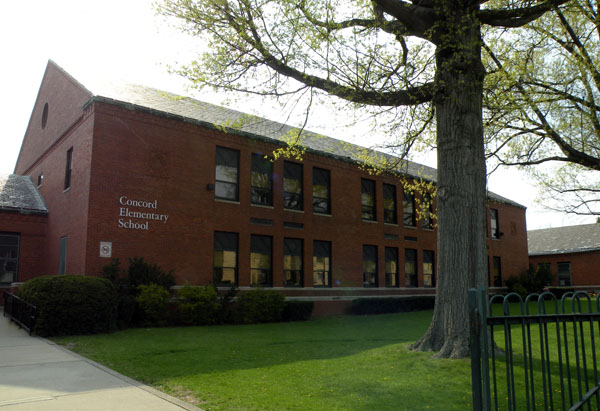

- Location within Pittsburgh
- 40°23′17.29″N 79°59′4.29″W
- Location: 2340 Brownsville Road (Carrick), Pittsburgh, Pennsylvania, USA

History
- Built: 1939

Concord Elementary School located at 2340 Brownsville Road in the Carrick neighborhood of Pittsburgh, Pennsylvania, is a public elementary school built in 1939. It was designed by Marion M. Steen (1886–1966) in Georgian Revival and Moderne style. It was added to the List of Pittsburgh History and Landmarks Foundation Historic Landmarks in 2001, and the List of City of Pittsburgh historic designations on November 30, 1999.
