= Dorothy Mae Richardson =

American activist

Dorothy Mae Richardson (May 3, 1922 – April 28, 1991) was an African American community activist who is credited with introducing a new model of community development in the late 1960s when she led a resident campaign for better housing in her neighborhood on the Central North Side of Pittsburgh, Pennsylvania.

In the mid-1960s, Richardson and her neighbors enlisted city bankers and government officials to help improve their neighborhood. Together, they convinced 16 financial institutions to give out conventional loans to the community, which were used to finance the rehabilitation of dilapidated homes. This effort laid the groundwork for the new field of community-based development and led to the founding of Neighborhood Housing Services (NHS) of Pittsburgh in 1968. The accomplishments of NHS of Pittsburgh became a resource for community leaders and led to the founding of similar programs in 300 cities across the United States. In 1978, Congress institutionalized the NHS network by establishing the Neighborhood Reinvestment Corporation, known today as NeighborWorks America, with its mission based on the community development efforts set forth by Richardson and her neighborhood a decade before.

Richardson was recognized as a "black urbanist" in a 2015 article on the NewGeography.com website.

== Personal life ==
Dorothy Mae Davis grew up in the Manchester neighborhood of Pittsburgh. Her family moved to the Charles Street Valley when she was about 16. She graduated from Allegheny High School in 1940. After her husband, steelworker Louis Richardson, returned from World War Two, they moved to the house that Dorothy would reside in for the rest of her life, at the corner of Charles Street and Cross Street.

Richardson remained an active community member throughout her life. In an interview with the Pittsburgh Press before her death, Richardson explained why she never left the North Side: "I went to school there. I got married there. All my friends are there." Richardson died of kidney failure at the age of 68 on April 28, 1991, at Allegheny General Hospital. She was survived by a son, Jonathan; one sister, Georgia Davis; and two brothers, David O. Davis and Daniel L. Davis.

== Activism ==
In the 1960s, many of America’s oldest inner city neighborhoods were being bulldozed and residents were moved to public housing projects under the urban renewal movement. The financial industry declared inner city neighborhoods as places that were deemed risky and unfit for good business investments. Richardson, a housewife, refused to see her neighborhood continue to decay. "I could see houses starting to lean, windows rotting away. The solution was not to tear down the whole neighborhood and move everybody into public housing. The solution was to fix the houses."

Richardson and her neighbors formed Citizens Against Slum Housing to raise money to help poor renters become homeowners.

"It all got started because of one block club…We were sick to death of all the terrible houses, the slum landlords and the rats. We planned to clean up 24 houses. We got the landlord to agree to the plan, and he gave us the spray and stuff to kill the rats and cockroaches. We got through five houses and ran out of the stuff and he reneged on his promise…"

Richardson and the block club knew money was the key to success. They enlisted city bankers and government officials to join in support of improving the neighborhood. The group then persuaded 16 financial institutions to support their neighborhood improvement efforts by making loans, capitalizing a revolving loan fund, and rehabilitate rundown homes. Richardson’s group raised $750,000 in grants from the area lending institutions, and the funds were used to create the Neighborhood Housing Services (NHS) of Pittsburgh in 1968.

During the 1970s and 1980s, Richardson remained a prominent figure in her neighborhood and elsewhere by educating and inspiring community leaders. She assisted them with establishing their own resident-led organizations.

== Legacy ==
In 1970, the Federal Home Loan Banks (FHLB) became involved with Neighborhood Housing Services of Pittsburgh. The two collaborated to provide special training to savings and loan officers about lending in urban neighborhoods. The FHLB trainings evolved into workshops for starting other Neighborhood Housing Services organizations around the country. A video documenting her work was produced by NeighborWorks America

In 1978, Congress charted the Neighborhood Reinvestment Corporation, known as NeighborWorks America, to promote reinvestment in older neighborhoods by local financial institutions in cooperation with the community, residents and local governments.

== Dorothy Richardson Award ==
In honor of Richardson’s life work, NeighborWorks America created the Dorothy Richardson Award for Resident Leadership in 1992. The award recognizes seven community leaders from around the country for their outstanding contributions to their communities. The award acknowledges outstanding individuals for their achievements in affordable housing and community-based development. Nominees must live and/or work in a community served by a NeighborWorks America affiliate organization and have at least two years of documented volunteer effort.

NHS of Pittsburgh, now known as Neighbor Works Western Pennsylvania, created the Dorothy Richardson Legacy Award in 2008 to recognize outstanding contributions by dedicated volunteers and long-serving board members.
