= Doughboy (Pittsburgh) =

- U.S. Historic district – Contributing property
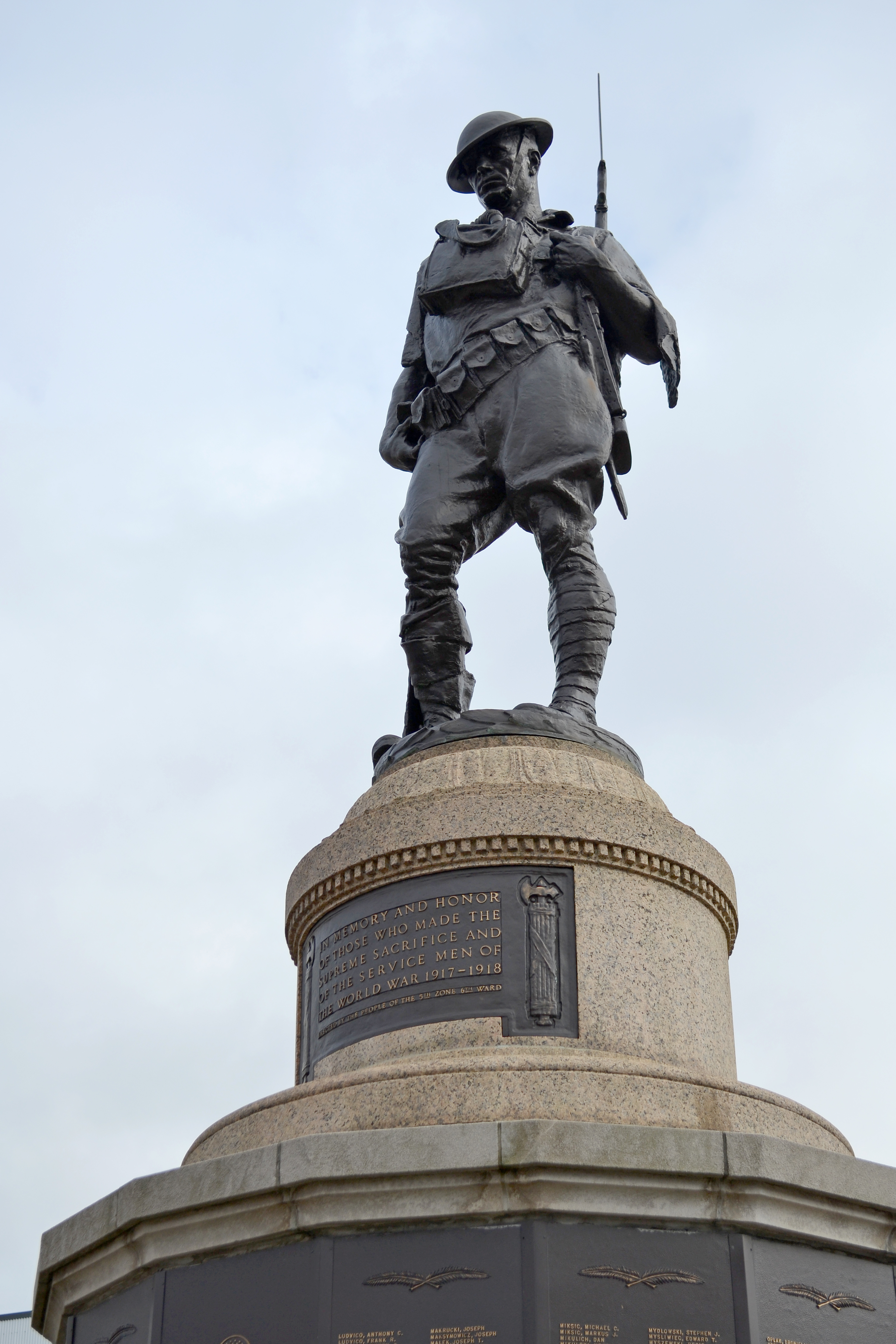
- The memorial in 2019

- Location within Pittsburgh
- Location: Butler St. and Penn Ave. Pittsburgh, Pennsylvania
- Coordinates: 40°27′47″N 79°58′01″W
- Built: 1921
- Architect: Allen George Newman
- Part of: Lawrenceville Historic District (ID100004020)
- Designated CP: July 8, 2019

The Doughboy is a war memorial and neighborhood landmark in the Lawrenceville neighborhood of Pittsburgh, Pennsylvania. Located at the Y-shaped intersection of Lawrenceville's two busiest commercial streets, Butler Street and Penn Avenue, the monument has become a symbol of the neighborhood and "probably the most well known veterans monument in Pittsburgh". In 2019, it was listed as a contributing property in the Lawrenceville Historic District.

The Doughboy statue was sculpted by Allen George Newman and dedicated on Memorial Day in 1921. It stands in a small triangular public space in front of the Pennsylvania National Bank Building called Doughboy Square.

== History ==
In 1918, the Lawrenceville Board of Trade organized a carnival in Arsenal Park to raise money for the troops fighting in World War I. When the war ended before the money could be put to use, neighborhood leaders decided to spend it on a memorial instead. The monument was sculpted by Allen George Newman, who was known for his military-themed works including The Hiker, a depiction of a weary Spanish–American War soldier which was widely reproduced. Newman's bronze Doughboy statue was unveiled on Memorial Day in 1921 with over 20,000 onlookers present; the Pittsburgh Gazette Times described the occasion as the "largest ceremonial event ever witnessed in Lawrenceville".

The memorial originally honored the residents of Pittsburgh's Sixth Ward (comprising Lower Lawrenceville, Polish Hill, and the upper Strip District) who served in World War I. In 1947, the statue was given a new marble and limestone base with bronze plaques listing the names of the 3,100 Sixth Ward residents who served in World War II, including the 53 who died in action. An additional plaque honoring veterans of the Korean War and Vietnam War was added to the railing around the memorial in 1984.

Newman made two other casts of the Doughboy statue. One was dedicated in 1929 in Memorial Park in Cliffside Park, New Jersey, while the other was kept in Newman's personal collection. After his death, the statue was sold to the village of Rhinebeck, New York, where it is displayed on East Market Street.

On Memorial Day 2020 the statue was vandalized with a message supportive of Shining Path.
