= Lawrenceville Historic District (Pittsburgh, Pennsylvania) =

Historic district in Pennsylvania, United States

- U.S. National Register of Historic Places
- U.S. Historic district
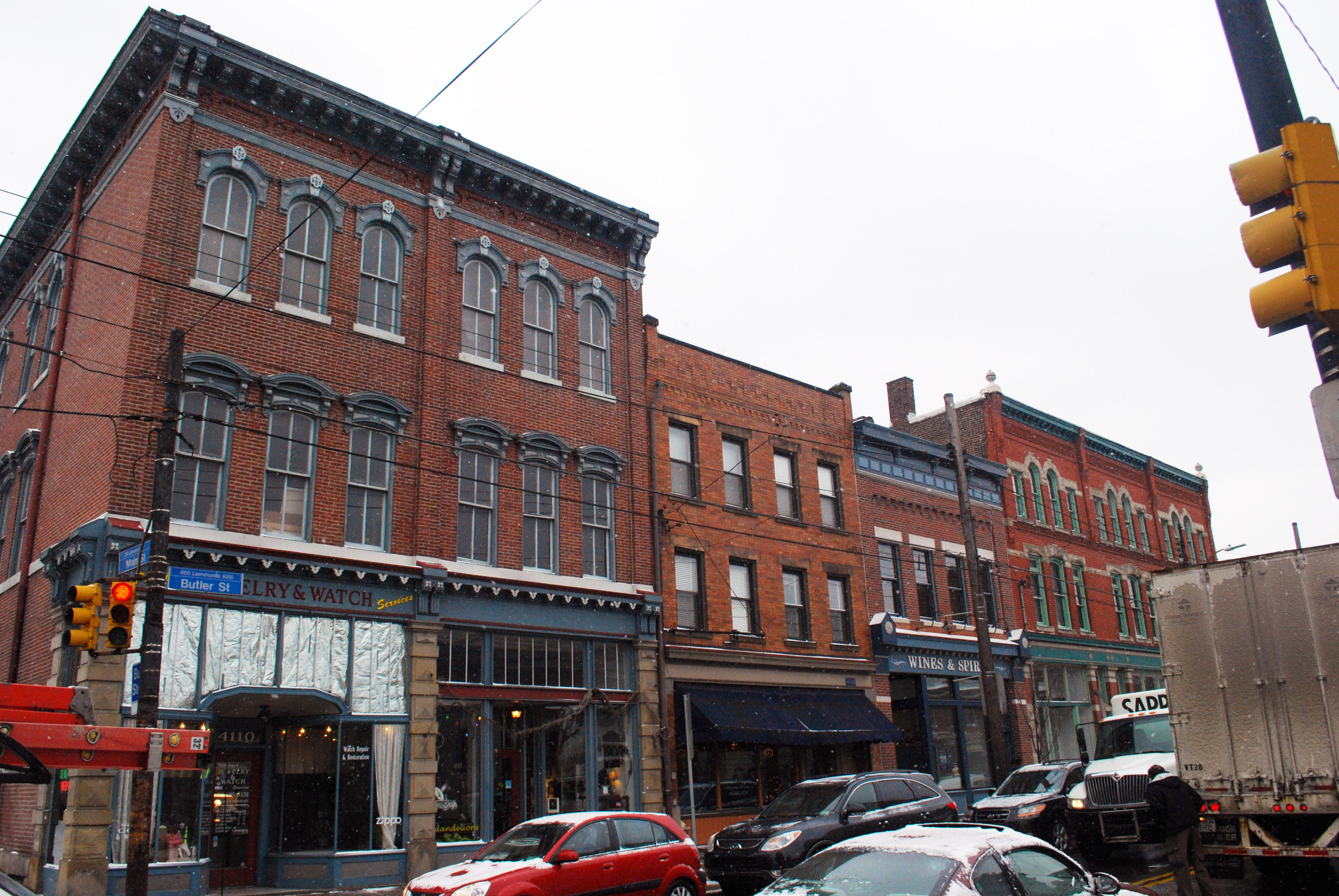
- Butler St. in Lawrenceville

- Location within Pittsburgh Location within Pennsylvania Location within the United States
- Location: Roughly bounded by 33rd St., Allegheny River, 55th St., Allegheny Cemetery, Penn Ave., 40th St., Liberty Ave., and Sassafras St., Pittsburgh, Pennsylvania
- Coordinates: 40°28′07″N 79°57′44″W
- Area: 916 acres (371 ha)
- NRHP reference No.: 100004020
- Added to NRHP: July 8, 2019

The Lawrenceville Historic District is a U.S. historic district in Pittsburgh, Pennsylvania, which encompasses the majority of the Lawrenceville neighborhood. The historic district includes 3,217 contributing resources, many of which are rowhouses, commercial buildings, and former industrial properties built between the 1830s and early 20th century. The district was listed on the National Register of Historic Places in 2019.

== Notable contributing properties ==
- Allegheny Arsenal
- Allegheny Cemetery†
- Arsenal Middle School†
- Bayard School†
- Boys' Club of Pittsburgh†
- Butler Street Gatehouse†
- Carnegie Library
- Carol Peterson House
- Consolidated Ice Company Factory No. 2†
- Doughboy
- Ewalt House (Demolished)
- Foster School†
- Holy Family Church
- Iron City Brewing Company
- Lawrence Public School†
- McCleary Elementary School†
- Mowry-Addison Mansion
- Naser's Tavern
- Pennsylvania National Bank Building
- Pittsburgh Wash House and Public Baths Building
- St. Augustine Church
- St. John the Baptist Church
- St. Mary Cemetery
- St. Mary's Academy
- St. Mary's Church
- Turney House
- U.S. Marine Hospital, Pittsburgh
- Walton House
- Washington Crossing Bridge†
- Washington Vocational School†

†Also individually NRHP-listed
