= Ewalt House =

- U.S. Historic district – Contributing property
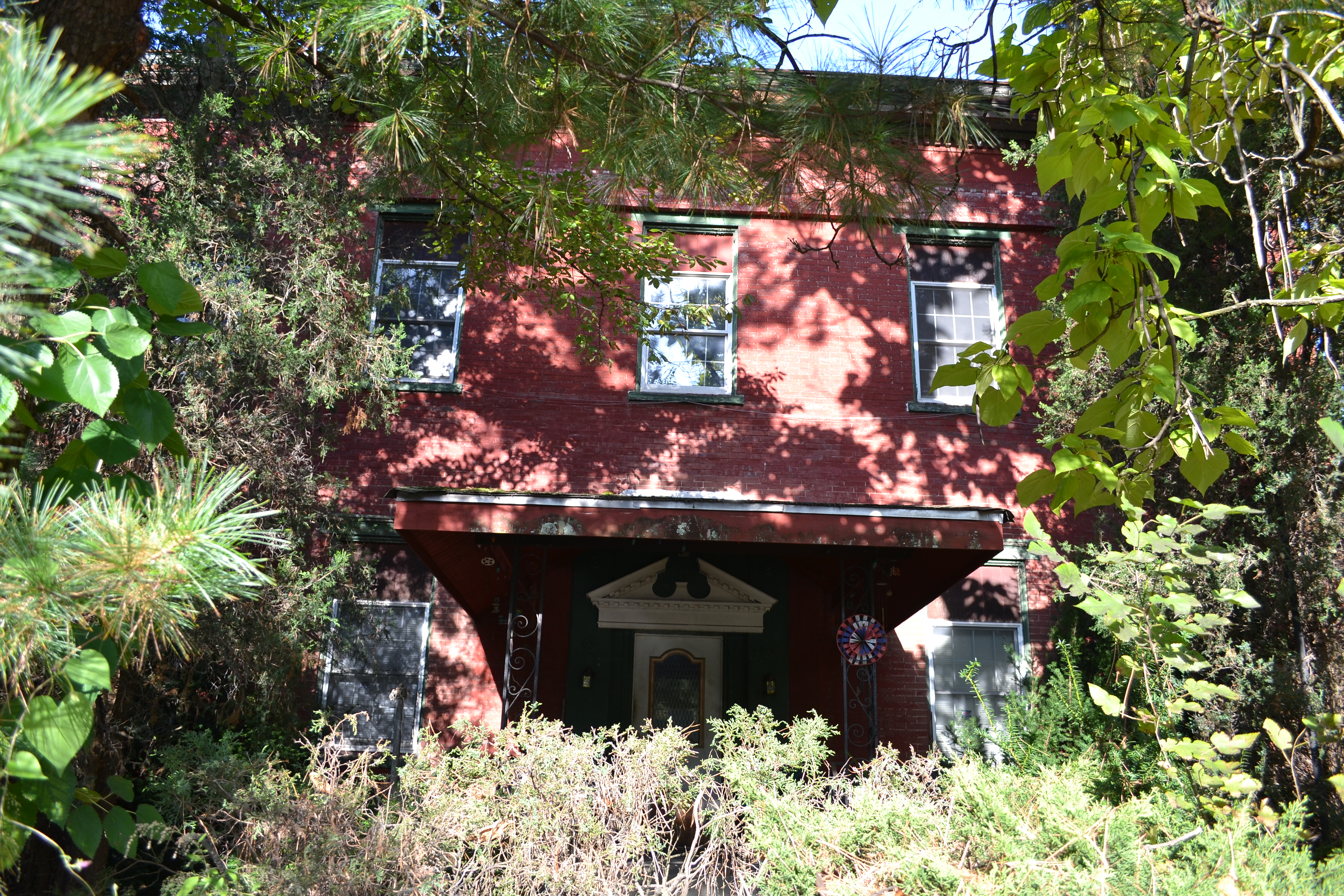
- The house in 2018
- Interactive map of Ewalt House
- Location: 186 Home St. Pittsburgh, Pennsylvania
- Coordinates: 40°28′25″N 79°57′32″W
- Built: before 1841
- Architectural style: Greek Revival
- Part of: Lawrenceville Historic District (ID100004020)
- Designated CP: July 8, 2019

The Ewalt House was a historic house in the Lawrenceville neighborhood of Pittsburgh, Pennsylvania, and a contributing property in the Lawrenceville Historic District. It was built as a country estate sometime between 1787 and 1840 by Samuel Ewalt, and remained standing after most of the land was subdivided for residential lots in the 1870s. The house was notable as a rare example of an antebellum style Greek Revival house in Pittsburgh, and exemplified the typical pattern of development in Lawrenceville in the mid to late 19th century. In 2019, the building was nominated as a Pittsburgh historic landmark.

== History ==
The house was built sometime before 1840 by Samuel Ewalt (1750–1847), a merchant and landowner who was a prominent citizen during Pittsburgh's early history. He was also the first sheriff of Allegheny County and a member of the Pennsylvania House of Representatives. In 1787, he bought a tract of land in present-day Lawrenceville for a country estate. The land in this area was divided into narrow strips perpendicular to the Allegheny River, providing riverfront access to each landowner. Ewalt's parcel spanned from present-day 43rd Street to 47th Street and inland as far as the Bloomfield vicinity, covering just over 263 acres (106 ha) in total.

The house's date of construction is unknown, but it was mentioned in Ewalt's will, dated 1841. A newspaper article from 1889 described the house as one of "the principal landmarks in that section of the three-quarters of a century ago." Later, the property was owned by Anna H. Irwin. After she died around 1871, most of the land was subdivided into residential lots like the other country estates in the area, and began to be densely developed. Unlike many of the other country houses, the Ewalt house remained standing, though a rear wing was demolished around 1890. From 1887 to 1890, it was the home of Charles Bickel, a notable architect, and from 1945 to 1977 it was used as a social hall by a Polish-American organization.

In August 2019, the house was hit by a windburst which damaged the roof supports and put pressure on the foundation which already was bowed and faltering. A structural engineer deemed the house uninhabitable and dangerous. A developer, who was going to purchase the house, was approved to build five townhomes on the Ewalt site. The house was nominated as a Pittsburgh historic landmark by the Lawrenceville Stakeholders advocacy group over the development of the five townhomes so they filed a historical nomination on December 3. The landmark nomination was approved by the Historic Review Commission and the City Planning Commission, after which it went before the Pittsburgh City Council in July, 2020. The City Council voted to delay the vote on the property until after July 22, meaning it would become a historic landmark by default on that date. However, the City Council later voted on August 26 to withdraw the nomination, and on September 24, they approved the owner's demolition permit. On October 7, the Ewalt House was torn down.

== Architecture ==
The Ewalt House was a two-story vernacular Greek Revival style building with a hipped roof. It was constructed from American bond brick, with corner pilasters and an entablature with a brick dentil course and wooden cornice. The house had a symmetrical five-bay facade with wood-framed window openings which had been retrofitted with smaller modern windows. An entrance porch and rear garage were later additions.
