= Mowry-Addison Mansion =

- U.S. Historic district – Contributing property
- Pittsburgh Historic Designation
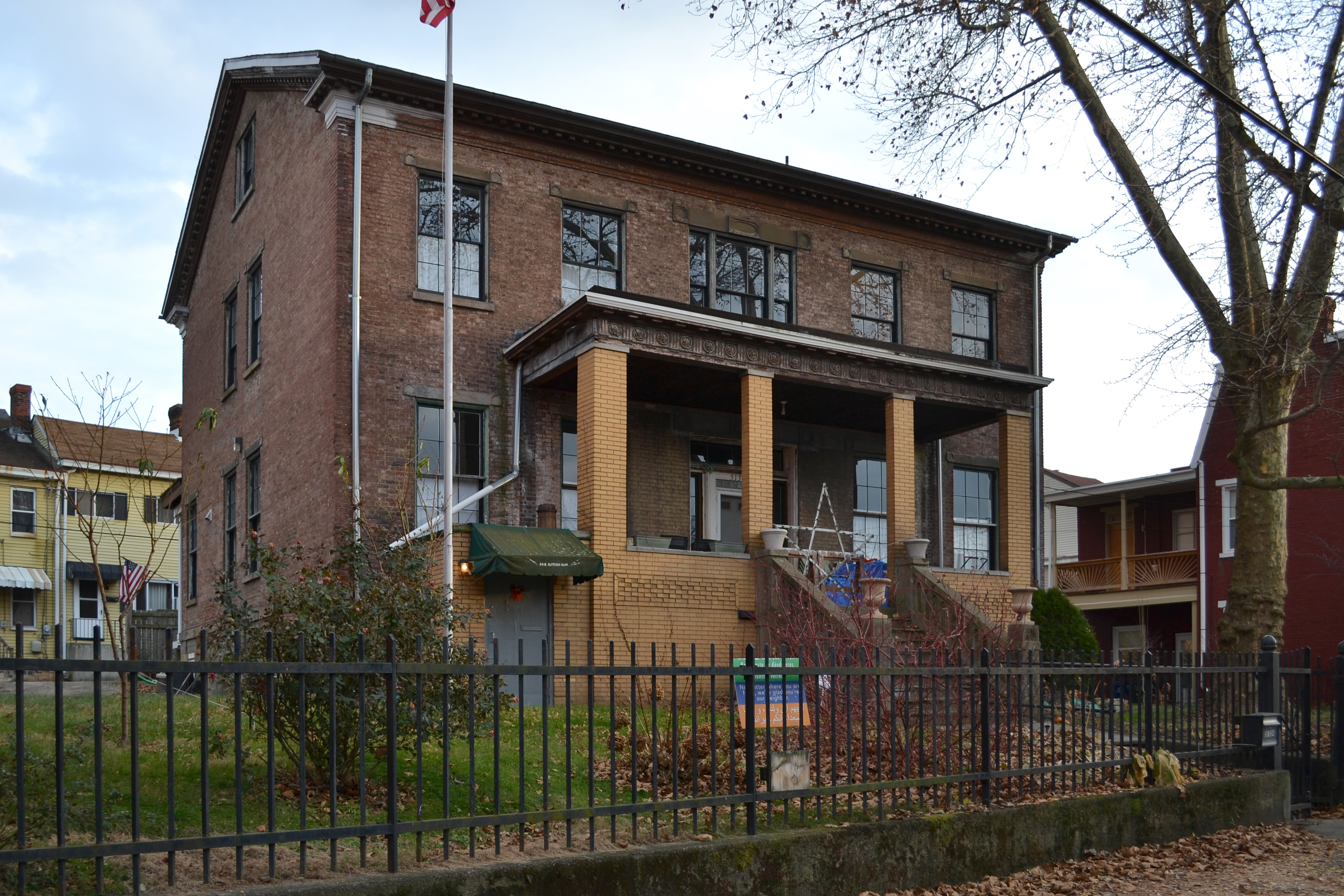
- The house in 2018

- Location within Pittsburgh
- Location: 5134 Carnegie St. Pittsburgh, Pennsylvania
- Coordinates: 40°28′43″N 79°57′14″W
- Built: 1830–32
- Part of: Lawrenceville Historic District (ID100004020)
- Designated CP: July 8, 2019

The Mowry-Addison Mansion is a historic house in the Upper Lawrenceville neighborhood of Pittsburgh, Pennsylvania, and a contributing property in the Lawrenceville Historic District. It was built in 1830–32 by Peter Mowry, a physician, and was originally part of a large estate that was subdivided into residential lots in 1872. The house is notable as a rare example of relatively well preserved Greek Revival architecture in Pittsburgh, and exemplifies the typical pattern of development in Lawrenceville in the mid to late 19th century. In 2020, the building was nominated as a Pittsburgh historic landmark by Preservation Pittsburgh, which stated that the mansion "is one of the last remaining and most significantly preserved regional ribbon farm dwellings from its period of construction."

== History ==
The house was built in 1830–32 by Dr. Peter Mowry (1770–1833), one of Pittsburgh's most prominent physicians during the first third of the 19th century. Like other nearby properties, Mowry's estate was a "ribbon farm", a long, narrow strip with a short section of riverfront allowing each farm access to the Allegheny. Mowry died shortly after the house was completed, but his widow Eliza Addison Mowry lived there until her own death in 1871. She sold the riverfront section of the estate for industrial development by the Lucy Furnace Company and Keystone Bridge Company. After her death, the property was sold to a partnership called Carnegie & Co., which divided it into about 244 residential lots and offered them for sale starting in 1872. The neighboring ribbon farms between 52nd and 55th Streets were similarly subdivided around the same time.

The Carnegie & Co. lots were gradually filled in with rowhouses between the 1870s and early 1900s. Most of the other old houses in the area were demolished during this period as they did not fit conveniently into the new plats, but the Mowry-Addison mansion remained standing on a five-lot parcel. From 1921 to 1973, the mansion housed the Slovenian Eagle Society, a mutual aid organization for Slovene Americans. The Slovenian Eagle Society's ownership of the mansion comprised the longest period of ownership, exceeding the Mowry ownership by ten years. After this, it housed the Pittsburgh Electric Club until 2004, when it was purchased by Carnegie Commons LLC for use as architectural offices.

== Architecture ==
The Mowry-Addison Mansion is a 2 1/2 story vernacular Greek Revival style house with a side-gabled roof. It is constructed from American bond brick set on a raised stone foundation. The front elevation is symmetrical and five bays wide, with a three-bay porch. Most of the windows are 6-over-6 wooden sash windows with stone sills and lintels. The lintels are ornamented with rosettes; other decoration includes dentil cornices and a porch frieze. The lower portion of the porch is a different type of brick and was a later addition. The rear elevation is also five bays wide with a partially enclosed porch. Although other structures in the Greek Revival style can be found throughout Pittsburgh (such as the Burke Building Downtown and various residential structures on the North Side), these structures are far more modest in scale compared to the Mowry-Addison Mansion.
