= Naser's Tavern =

- U.S. Historic district – Contributing property
- Pittsburgh Historic Designation
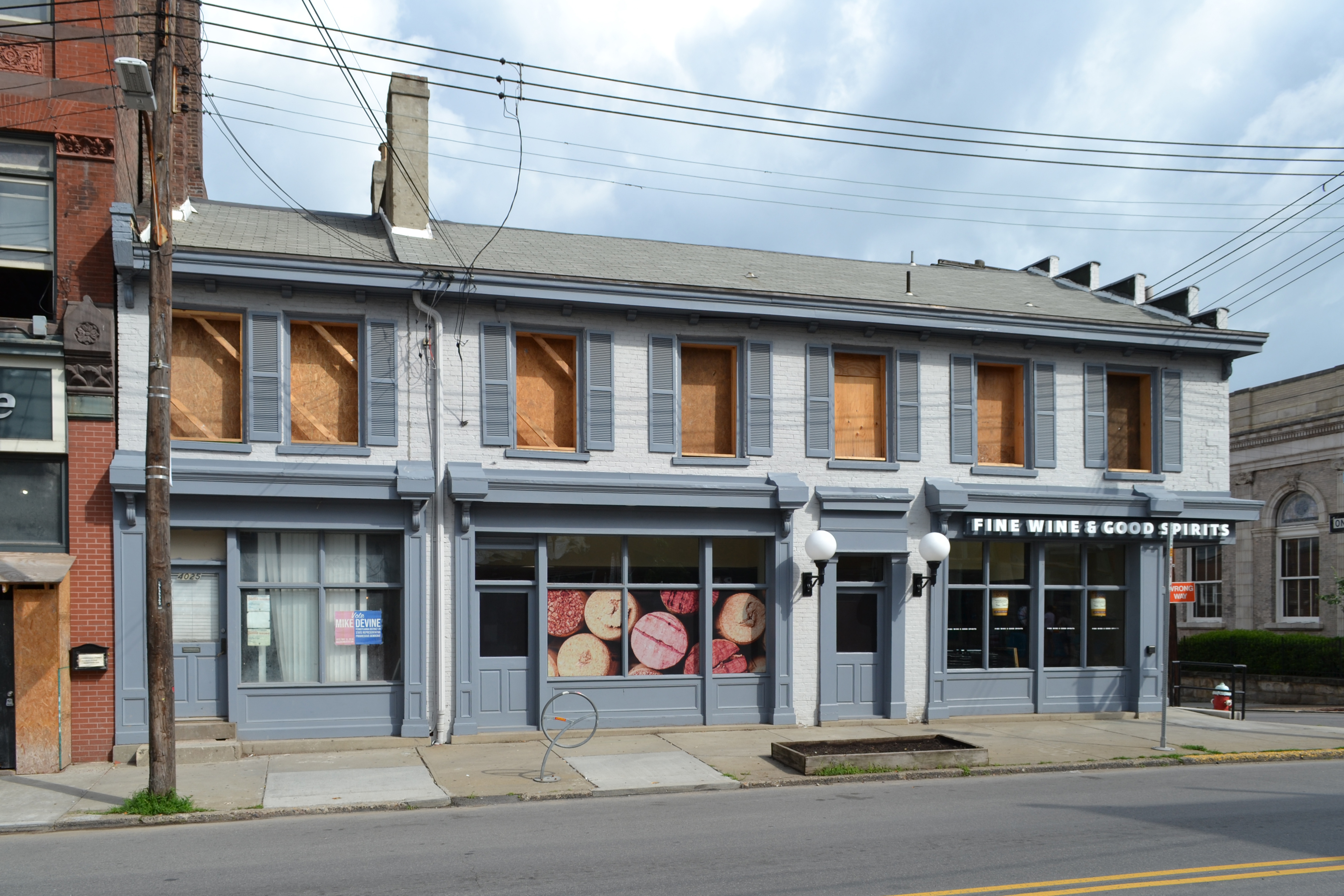
- The building in 2018

- Location within Pittsburgh
- Location: 4025–4029 Butler St. Pittsburgh, Pennsylvania
- Coordinates: 40°28′10″N 79°57′41″W
- Built: c. 1836
- Part of: Lawrenceville Historic District (ID100004020)
- Designated CP: July 8, 2019

Naser's Tavern is a historic building in the Lawrenceville neighborhood of Pittsburgh, Pennsylvania, and a designated Pittsburgh historic landmark. It is thought to be the oldest surviving building on Butler Street, the main commercial street in Lawrenceville. The structure was probably built by John Kingan between 1833 and 1846, as the price of the property when Kingan sold it indicates there was already a substantial building on the site. At the time, it was at the edge of the built-up area of Butler Street, which spanned approximately one block on either side of the Allegheny Arsenal (that is, 38th Street to 41st Street). John Naser, a German immigrant, bought the property in 1846 and operated an inn and tavern there which he called "Our House". His son Charles took over the business in the 1870s and expanded the building with several additions, including a second floor which was built sometime between 1893 and 1905. The Naser family sold the building in 1943. As of 2018 it houses a branch of Pennsylvania's state-run liquor store, Fine Wine & Good Spirits.

The main block of the building is two stories tall with a gable roof and fronts on Butler Street. It has three first-floor storefronts with individual entrances, as well as a separate apartment entrance, all with wooden, Greek Revival style trim. The corner of the first story is cut away to provide a corner entrance. The westernmost storefront is part of an addition that was constructed sometime before 1870, which is demarcated by a pair of chimneys. The second story is seven bays wide and three bays deep, with a stepped gable facing 41st Street. Behind the main block are several additions extending along 41st Street.
