= Pennsylvania National Bank Building =

- U.S. Historic district – Contributing property
- Pittsburgh Historic Designation
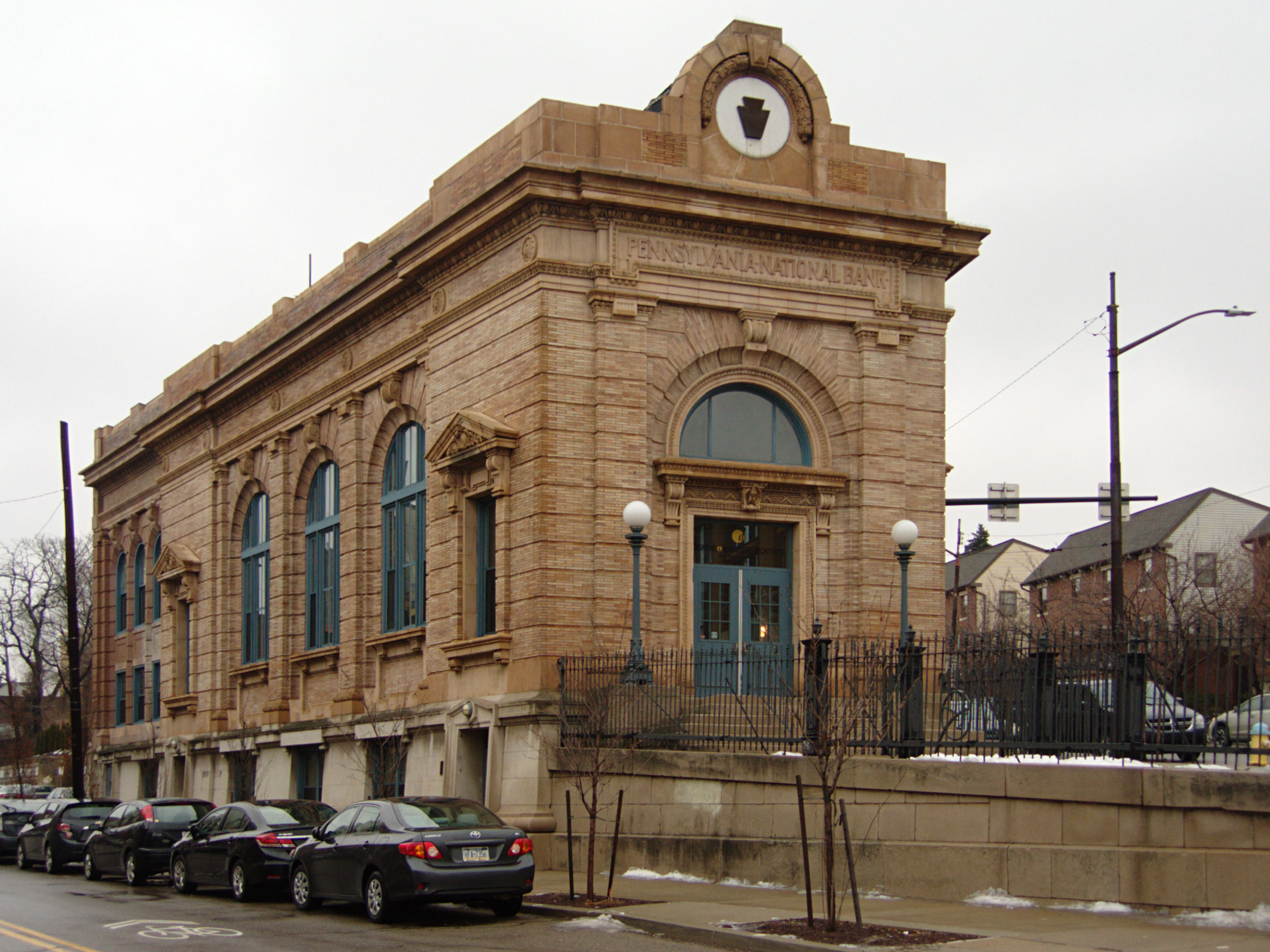
- The building in 2015

- Location within Pittsburgh
- Location: 3400 Butler St. Pittsburgh, Pennsylvania
- Coordinates: 40°27′48″N 79°58′00″W
- Built: 1903
- Architect: Beezer Brothers
- Architectural style: Beaux-Arts
- Part of: Lawrenceville Historic District (ID100004020)
- Designated CP: July 8, 2019

The Pennsylvania National Bank Building is a historic building in the Lawrenceville neighborhood of Pittsburgh, Pennsylvania. It is located on a prominent site facing Doughboy Square, the acute intersection of Butler Street and Penn Avenue which is often considered the "entrance to Lawrenceville".

== History ==
The building was constructed in 1902–03 as the new headquarters of the Pennsylvania National Bank, which had operated out of an earlier three-story building on the same site since 1893. The building was listed as a contributing property in the Lawrenceville Historic District in 2019 and a Pittsburgh historic landmark in 2020.

The Pennsylvania National Bank Building is a one-story, Beaux-Arts-style building constructed from buff-colored brick with terra cotta ornaments. It was designed by the Beezer Brothers, who also designed the nearby St. John the Baptist Church which was completed the same year. The bank's footprint is trapezoidal, with the non-parallel sides defined by the streets on either side.

The narrow front of the building has a single entrance bay and an arched parapet decorated with a keystone emblem. The two side elevations are both five bays wide with a combination of arched and pedimented windows; however, the Butler Street side also has an exposed basement due to the sloping topography of the site. The rear of the building has two additions, the latter of which was added in 2019 by the current tenant, Desmone Architects.
