= Walton House (Pittsburgh) =

- U.S. Historic district – Contributing property
- Pittsburgh Historic Designation
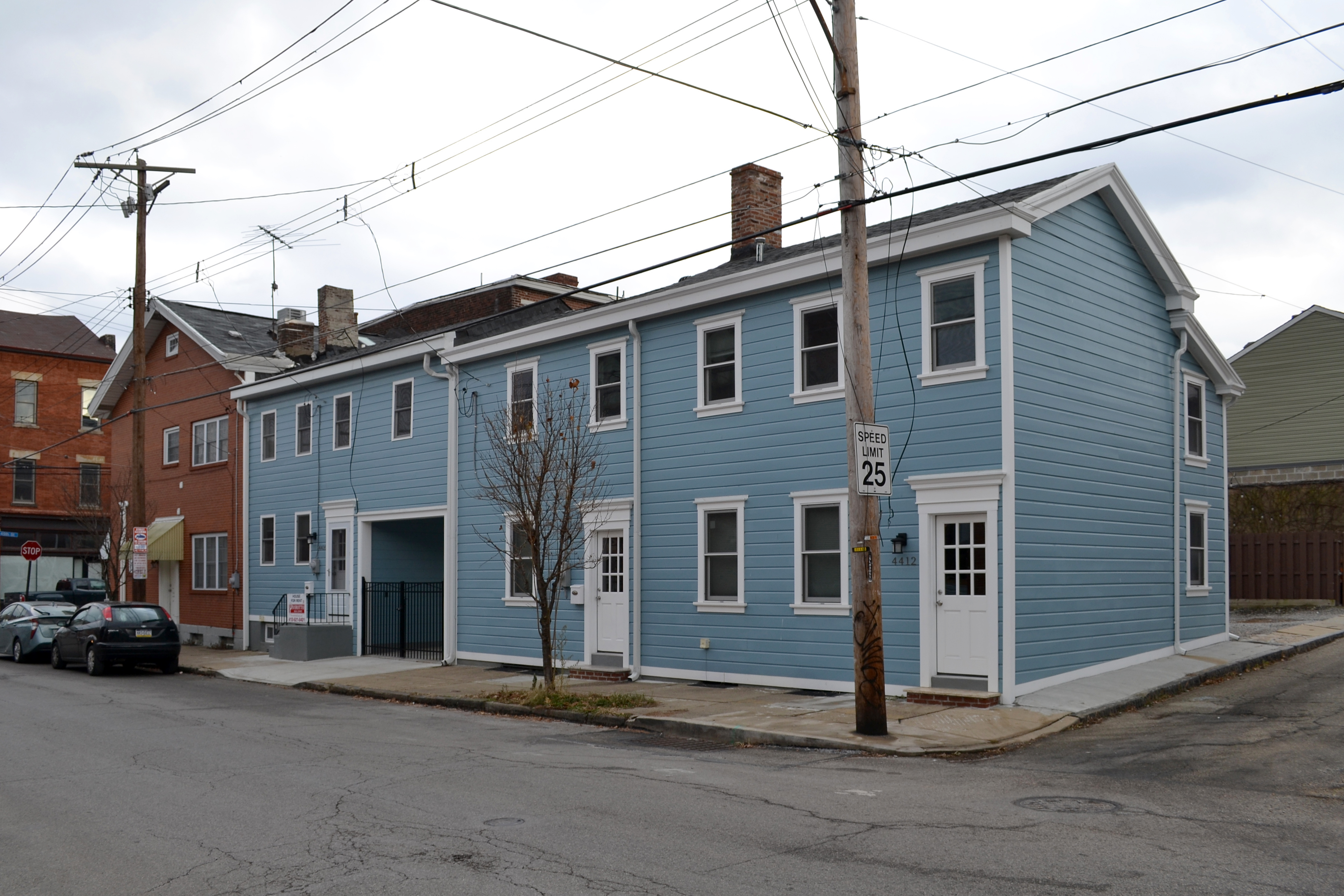
- Walton House, right, and adjoining buildings in 2018

- Location within Pittsburgh
- Location: 4412–4414 Plummer St. Pittsburgh, Pennsylvania
- Coordinates: 40°28′23″N 79°57′40″W
- Built: c. 1868
- Part of: Lawrenceville Historic District (ID100004020)
- Designated CP: July 8, 2019

The Walton House is a historic building in the Lawrenceville neighborhood of Pittsburgh, Pennsylvania. A designated Pittsburgh historic landmark, the house and its neighboring structures exemplify the form and scale of buildings constructed in Lawrenceville during the post Civil War era.

== History ==
The Walton House was built circa 1868 by William and Martha Walton, who emigrated from England and settled in Pennsylvania sometime in the 1860s. During that decade, Walton operated a jewelry store on Market Street in Lawrenceville. The couple's former property also includes the two adjoining houses at 4416 Plummer St. and 152 45th St. All three buildings were built between 1865 and 1872, but 4412–4414 Plummer St. is thought to be the oldest. During the 1870s, part of the property was operated as an inn and tavern.

== Architecture ==
The Walton House is a two-story, side-gabled double house of frame construction, with vinyl siding installed over the original clapboards. The building is five bays wide with 1-over-1 sash windows used throughout. The corner unit (4412 Plummer St.) has a two-story shed-roofed extension at the rear. The adjoining house at 4416 Plummer St. has an unusual covered breezeway connecting to the rear of the property, which may be related to its use as an inn during the 1870s. The Walton House and its neighbors exemplify the form and scale of buildings constructed in Lawrenceville during the post Civil War era.
