= Foster School =

- U.S. National Register of Historic Places
- U.S. Historic district – Contributing property
- City of Pittsburgh Historic Structure
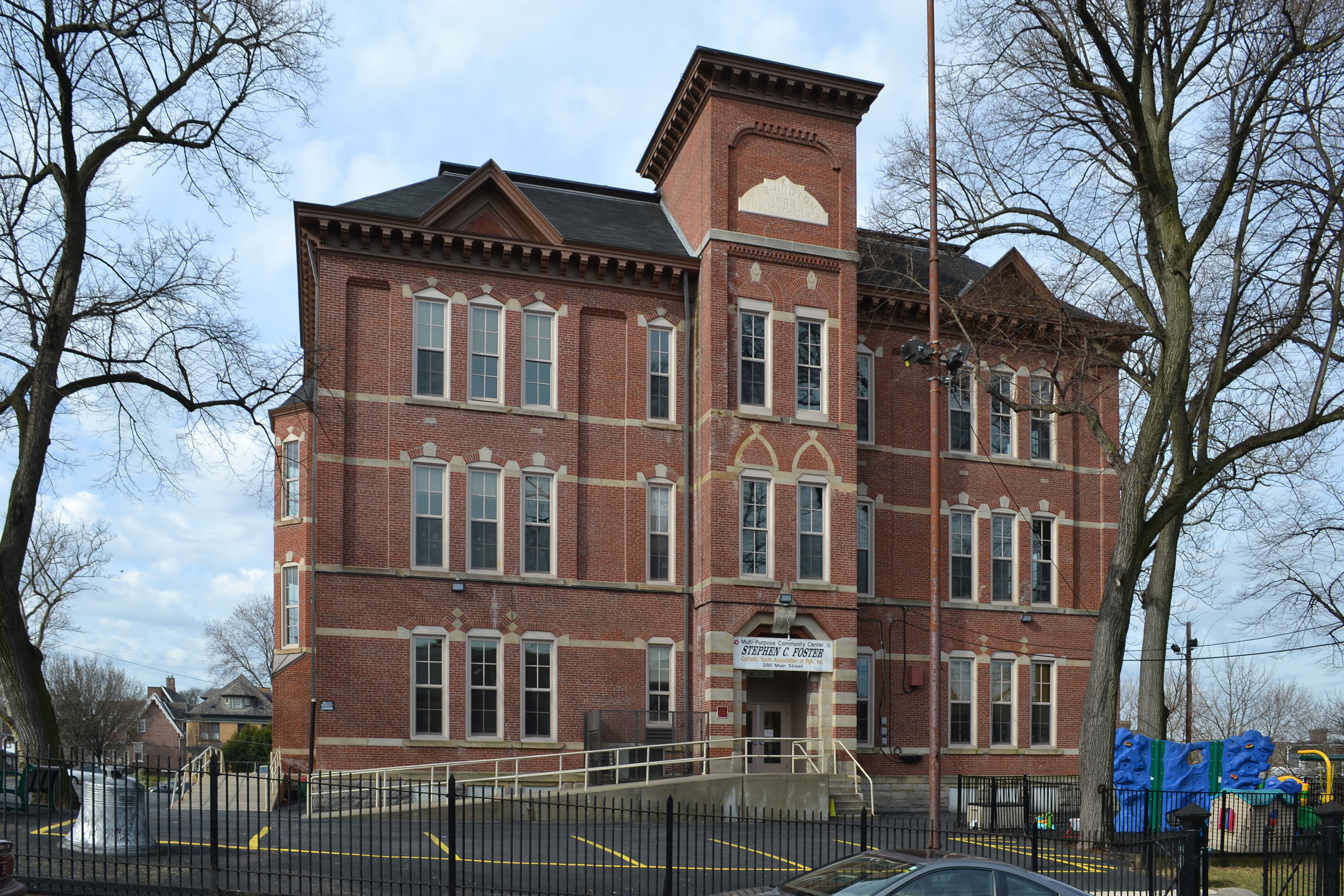
- The former school in 2019

- Location within Pittsburgh Location within Pennsylvania Location within the United States
- Location: 286 Main St., Pittsburgh, Pennsylvania
- Coordinates: 40°28′3″N 79°57′32″W
- Area: 2 acres (0.81 ha)
- Built: 1886
- Architectural style: Late Victorian
- Part of: Lawrenceville Historic District (ID100004020)
- MPS: Pittsburgh Public Schools TR
- NRHP reference No.: 86002667

Significant dates
- Added to NRHP: September 30, 1986
- Designated CP: July 8, 2019
- Designated CPHS: July 8, 1982

The Stephen C. Foster School, also known as the Stephen C. Foster Community Center, is a historic school building in the Central Lawrenceville neighborhood of Pittsburgh, Pennsylvania. It is named for composer Stephen Foster, whose father William Barclay Foster once owned the land on which the building is located. The school opened in 1886 and operated until 1939, when its students were transferred to the new elementary wing of Arsenal Junior High School. Since 1939, the building has been used as a community center.

The Foster School was listed on the National Register of Historic Places in 1986. It is also a contributing property in the Lawrenceville Historic District.

== History ==
The school was built in 1885–86 as the Washington Sub-District School No. 2. At the time, Pittsburgh's public schools were organized into ward-based sub-districts with the Washington Sub-District serving the 17th Ward or present-day Central Lawrenceville. The land on which the school was built had been donated as a burial ground by William Barclay Foster, the founder of Lawrenceville, and contained about 500 graves including those of veterans of the War of 1812. However, after the cemetery stopped being used for new burials sometime in the 1860s, it became overgrown and was described as a "rendezvous for bad characters". Eventually, the local school board asked to use the site for a school and was given the property by the city.

In 1882, a contractor was hired to begin grading the site. While some of the graves were moved to new sites by relatives and friends of the deceased, many of the remains were plowed up and deposited in a mass grave on the side of the property. The Pittsburgh Post reported,

...the workmen have unearthed the corpse of Miss Johnston, who was buried twenty years ago, and whose remains still have a life-like appearance. Twenty-five soldiers from the arsenal lie over near the fence, but the Government will not do anything with them. Nine bodies were found in one pit near the fence. One of these had two bullets through his skull. A second was found with hob-nailed shoes on and a pipe beside him.

Work was temporarily halted after a lawsuit from a group of concerned local citizens including William Foster's son Morrison Foster, who maintained that the plot had been donated for burial purposes only and could not be used for a school. Foster told the Post,

...many brave soldiers who had served their country faithfully were buried there, and if my father had supposed at this day knaves were knocking their sconces about with dirty shovels he would never have granted that ground for burying purposes, but it would have remained our private property and inheritance.

The case eventually reached the Pennsylvania Supreme Court, which decided in the school board's favor, allowing the project to go ahead. A granite monument was placed at the site to acknowledge the unclaimed remains still buried there.

The school cost about $40,000 and was reported to be "fitted up with all the latest improvements" including electric bells and speaking tubes for teachers to communicate with the principal. Part of the school property was later donated to build the Lawrenceville Branch of the Carnegie Library of Pittsburgh, which opened in 1898. In 1913, the school board decided to eliminate numbered schools and give each school a unique name. Washington School No. 2 was then renamed the Stephen C. Foster School in honor of the popular composer, who was the son of William Foster and younger brother of Morrison Foster. In 1914, workers uncovered more human remains while digging in the school basement.

In 1939, after the completion of a new elementary wing at Arsenal Junior High School, the Foster, Bayard, and Lawrence schools all closed, with their students reassigned to the new school. Shortly afterward, the Foster building was leased to a Catholic organization for use as a community center. The Catholic Youth Association bought the building from Pittsburgh Public Schools in 1955 and continues to own and operate the community center as of 2024.

== Architecture ==
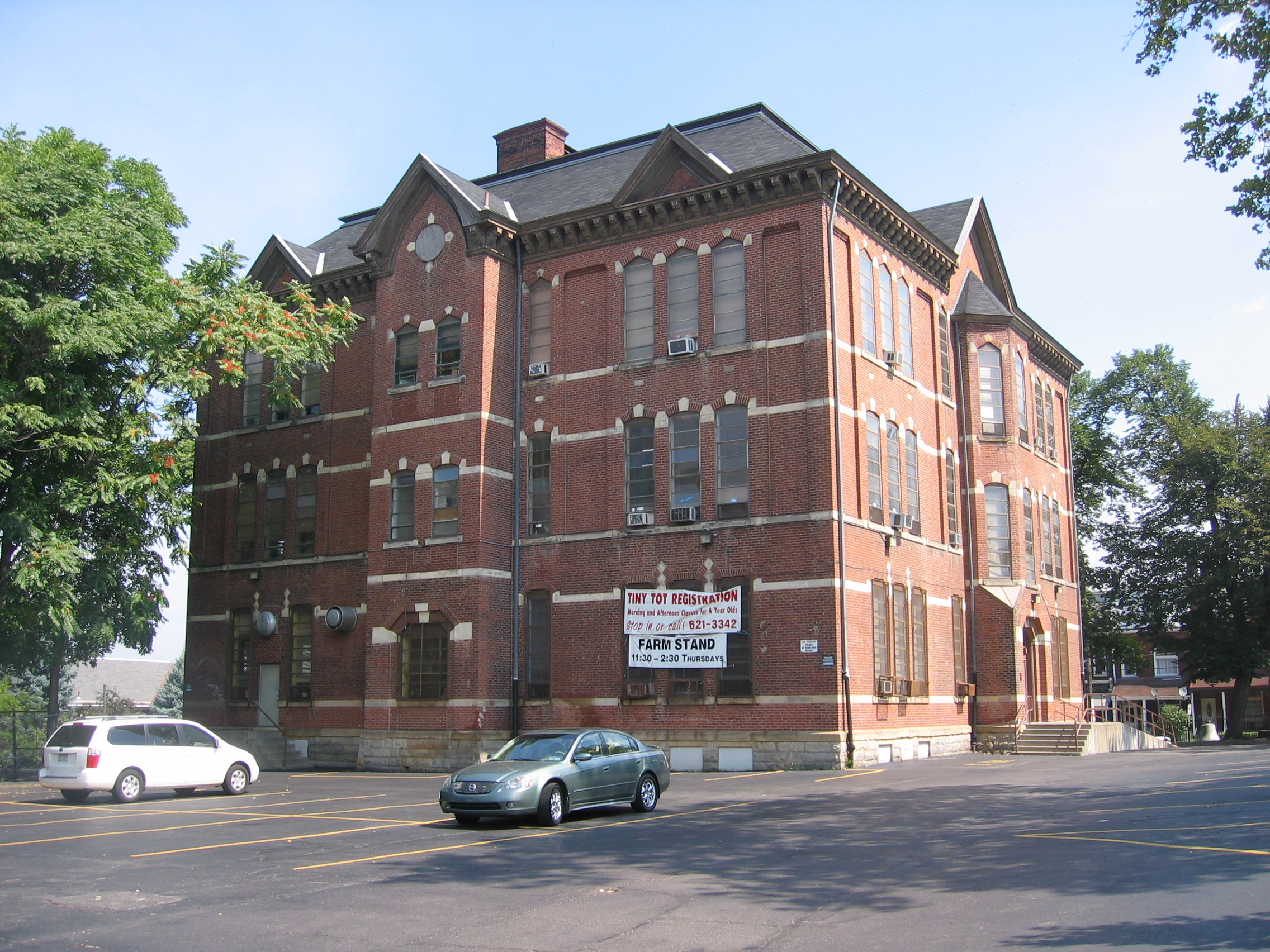
The rear of the building

The Foster School is a three-story brick building with stone trim. It is 80 feet (24 m) square with projecting entrance bays on each side. The front entrance is topped with a four-story tower with an inscribed datestone. The roof is hipped with a flat center and several small gables—two on the front elevation, three on the rear, and one on each side.

The interior layout of the building, with four large classrooms on each floor radiating from a central hallway, has not been modified. Some original wood trim and coffered ceilings are still present.
