= Washington Education Center (Pittsburgh) =

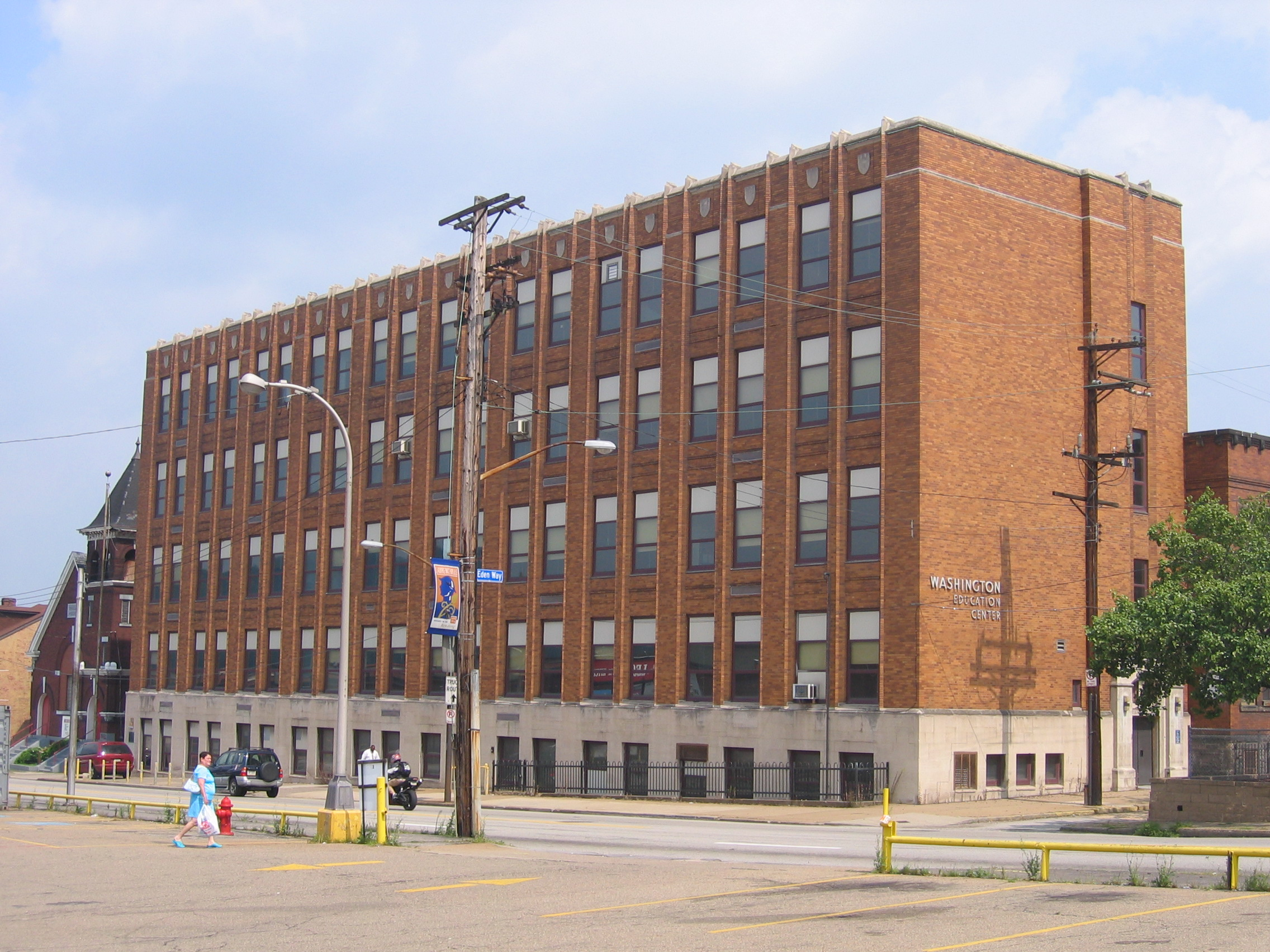

Location
- 169 40th St. Pittsburgh, Pennsylvania 15216; United States

Information
- Type: Public
- Established: September 1, 1937
- Closed: 2006
- School district: Pittsburgh Public Schools
- Grades: 9–12
- Website: 40.4695°N 79.9628°W
- Washington Vocational School
- U.S. National Register of Historic Places
- U.S. Historic district – Contributing property
- Pittsburgh Landmark – PHLF
- Area: 1 acre (0.40 ha)
- Built: 1908
- Architect: Charles W. Bier, Marion M. Steen
- Architectural style: Late Victorian, Art Deco
- Part of: Lawrenceville Historic District (ID100004020)
- MPS: Pittsburgh Public Schools TR
- NRHP reference No.: 86002715

Significant dates
- Designated NRHP: September 30, 1986
- Designated CP: July 8, 2019
- Designated PHLF: 2002

Washington Education Center, originally known as the Washington Industrial School, is a former vocational school in the Pittsburgh neighborhood of Lawrenceville at 40th Street and Eden Way. It was listed on the National Register of Historic Places in 1986 and was designated a Historic Landmark by the Pittsburgh History and Landmarks Foundation in 2002. The school operated from 1909 to 2006 and was later converted into a hotel.

The school was named in honor of George Washington's 1753 crossing of the Allegheny River with Christopher Gist, which occurred nearby. A marker on the school noting the event was dedicated in 1908.

== History ==
The Washington Industrial School opened in 1909 next door to Washington Sub-District School No. 1 on 40th Street. It was reported to be Pittsburgh's first school building entirely devoted to industrial training. The two-story building, designed by the "otherwise unknown" architect Charles W. Bier, contained a "reception room, display room, carving room, drafting room, directors' room, lathe room, bench room, and demonstration room" on the first floor and on the second floor the "modeling department, freehand drawing room, sewing room, kitchen, dining room and pantry, in addition to which is a spacious library". A swimming pool and gymnasium were located in the basement.

In 1930, the school was expanded to take in the students from the Arsenal Trade School, which was being razed to clear the site for Arsenal Junior High School. A one-story shop building was constructed behind the school to accommodate the additional students. In 1937, a much larger addition was built onto the front of the original school with the help of federal Public Works Administration funding. The new building was a four-story, Art-Deco-style structure designed by Marion M. Steen. It had a capacity of 900 students and included facilities for printing, drafting, and bricklaying along with an auditorium.

By 1969, the school's enrollment had declined to only 100 students and it was converted from a vocational-technical high school into an "Education Center" which housed various programs including occupational-vocational-technical classes and an experimental open classroom school. On February 2, 1972, Julie Nixon Eisenhower visited the school during her fathers re-election campaign to discuss busing. In May 1972, an international contingent of students visited the center from Brazil, Thailand, South Korea, Venezuela, Chile, Peru, Afghanistan, and Libya.

The building was listed on the National Register of Historic Places in 1986. It was used as a school until 2006 and later sold with plans to be converted to a hotel. It opened in 2019 as the TRYP by Wyndham Pittsburgh/Lawrenceville, with 108 guest rooms and two restaurants. The hotel experienced financial problems and is facing foreclosure as of 2025, with one developer proposing to turn the building into affordable housing.
