= Carol Peterson House =

- U.S. Historic district – Contributing property
- Pittsburgh Historic Designation
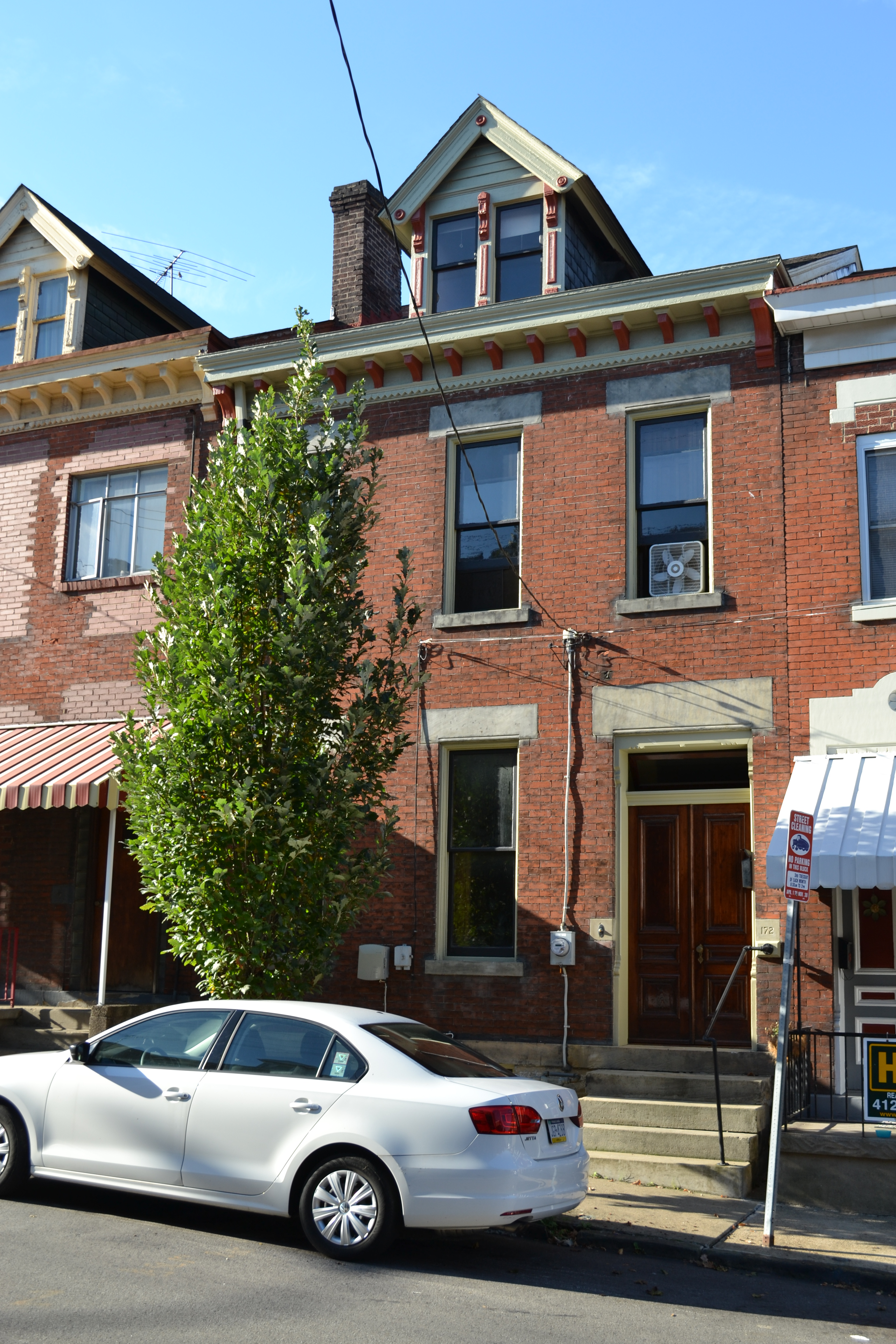
- The house in 2018

- Location within Pittsburgh
- Location: 172 46th St. Pittsburgh, Pennsylvania
- Coordinates: 40°28′24.11″N 79°57′35.46″W
- Built: 1886–1887; 139 years ago
- Architect: Sylvanus W. McCluskey
- Part of: Lawrenceville Historic District (ID100004020)
- Designated CP: July 8, 2019

The Carol Peterson House is located at 172 46th Street in the Lawrenceville neighborhood of Pittsburgh, Pennsylvania. The house was built in 1886–1887 in the Italianate architectural style, and is named after the architectural historian Carol Peterson.

== History ==
Prior to the construction of the Peterson House, in the mid-nineteenth century the ground was occupied by a mansion that stretched from Butler Street to the Allegheny River. The mansion was owned by Anna H. Irwin who died around the early 1880s. Following her death, her property was subdivided into building lots that fronted 46th Street. The lot which now stands at 172 46th Street was purchased by David Sisk on June 15, 1886. On September 24, 1886, David, and his wife Elizabeth, received a permit to commission construction for the two-story brick house. Records list Sylvanus W. McCluskey as both the building contractor and the architect for the house. The house was occupied by many different owners since that time, until in 2006 it was conveyed to Carol Peterson. Carol Peterson was an architectural historian whose writings and work contributed to Pittsburgh’s historiography, and advanced historic preservation of the city’s resources. Peterson lived at 172 46th Street for nearly 16 years, and this is where she wrote the majority of her works. Peterson died in December 2017 after a seven-year battle with breast and lung cancer, at the age of 58. Peterson’s works include her Pittsburgh House Histories, which detailed the histories of nearly 2,000 individual houses in the Pittsburgh area. She also co-authored Allegheny City: A History of Pittsburgh’s North Side with the late former Pittsburgh Steelers owner Dan Rooney. She also made numerous other important contributions to recognizing and preserving Pittsburgh’s history, and received many civic, professional, and preservation awards for her works. Her house was nominated in March 2018 to become a City Historic Landmark by Preservation Pittsburgh.

== Architecture ==
The house was designed by architect Sylvanus McCluskey in the Italianate architectural style. The examples of the Italianate style can be seen with the symmetry of the primary façade, the one-over-one double-hung windows, and the stone lintels that are flush with the brick façade. In the interior, the four-panel doors with porcelain knobs, the flared newel posts and spindles, the non-symmetrical door and window trim, and the marble and wood mantels with arched openings all are characteristics of Italianate architecture. This style of architecture was made popular through the published works of architect Andrew Jackson Downing in the mid-1880s. Italianate architecture is relatively common throughout Pittsburgh, but the Peterson House maintains a high degree of integrity that is representative of the Lawrenceville row house archetype.
