= Lawrence Public School =

- U.S. National Register of Historic Places
- U.S. Historic district – Contributing property
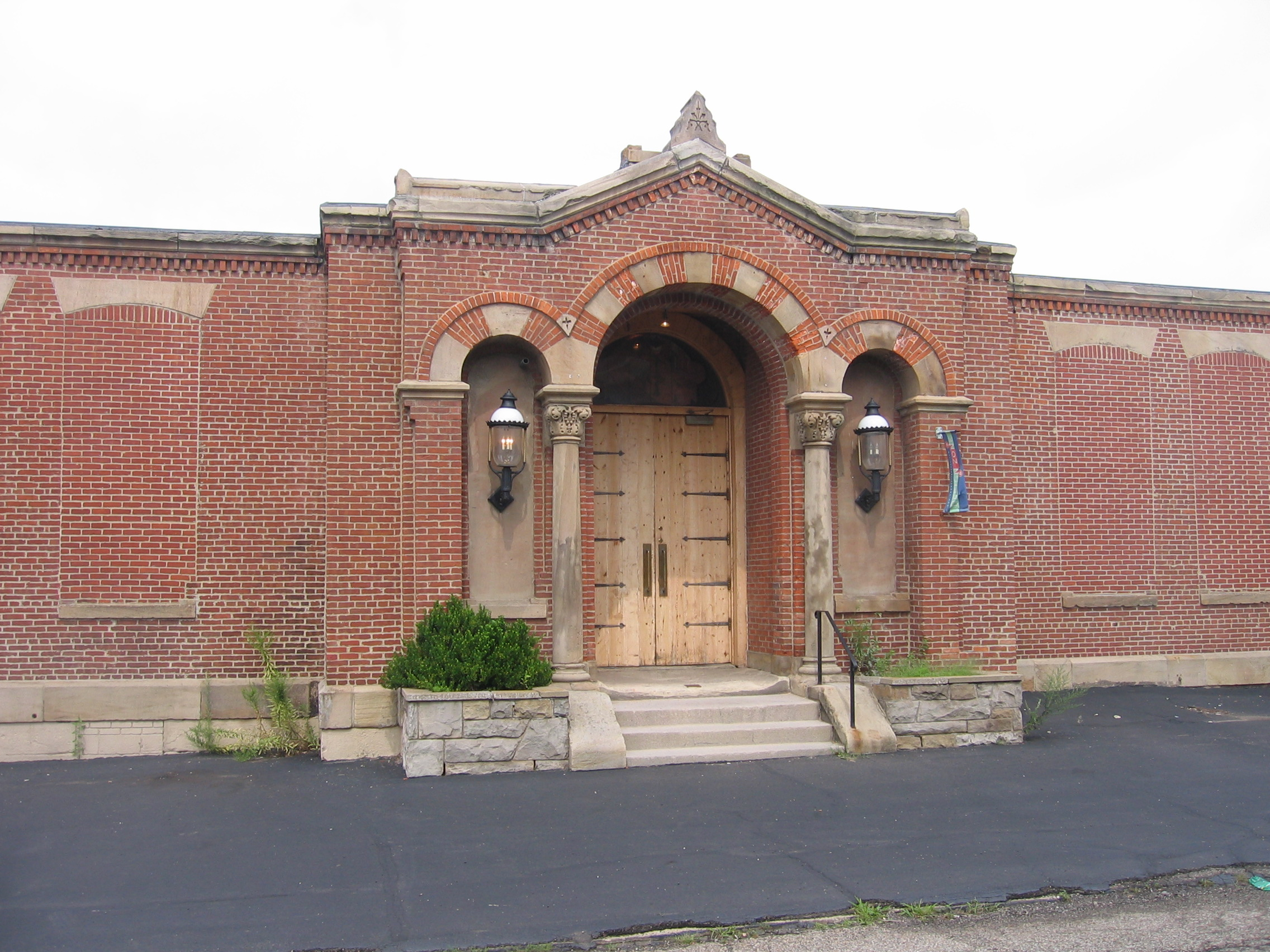
- The school's surviving first floor

- Location within Pittsburgh Location within Pennsylvania Location within the United States
- Location: 3701 Charlotte St., Pittsburgh, Pennsylvania
- Coordinates: 40°28′01″N 79°57′56″W
- Area: less than one acre
- Built: 1872
- Architect: Barr & Moser
- Architectural style: Italianate
- Part of: Lawrenceville Historic District (ID100004020)
- MPS: Pittsburgh Public Schools TR
- NRHP reference No.: 86002679

Significant dates
- Added to NRHP: September 30, 1986
- Designated CP: July 8, 2019

The Lawrence Public School, which is located in the Lawrenceville neighborhood of Pittsburgh, Pennsylvania, was built in 1872 and served as an elementary school, including instruction in the German language.

== History and architectural features ==
This historic structure was named after Captain James Lawrence, whose last words, "Don't give up the ship!", gained fame during the War of 1812.

The school was damaged by a fire in 1912, but was able to be repaired. Reportedly, a crowd of school children danced and cheered as the building burned and its 200-pound (91 kg) bell fell from its supports. It closed in 1939, along with the nearby Bayard School and Foster School, when all students were transferred to the new elementary wing of Arsenal Junior High School.

The building was sold in 1945 and then used as a warehouse.

The school was listed on the National Register of Historic Places in 1986. The two upper floors were destroyed by a fire in 1987 and the building was truncated at the ground floor.

Since 2017, it has housed a brewery, Eleventh Hour Brewing.
