= Consolidated Ice Company Factory No. 2 =

- U.S. National Register of Historic Places
- U.S. Historic district – Contributing property
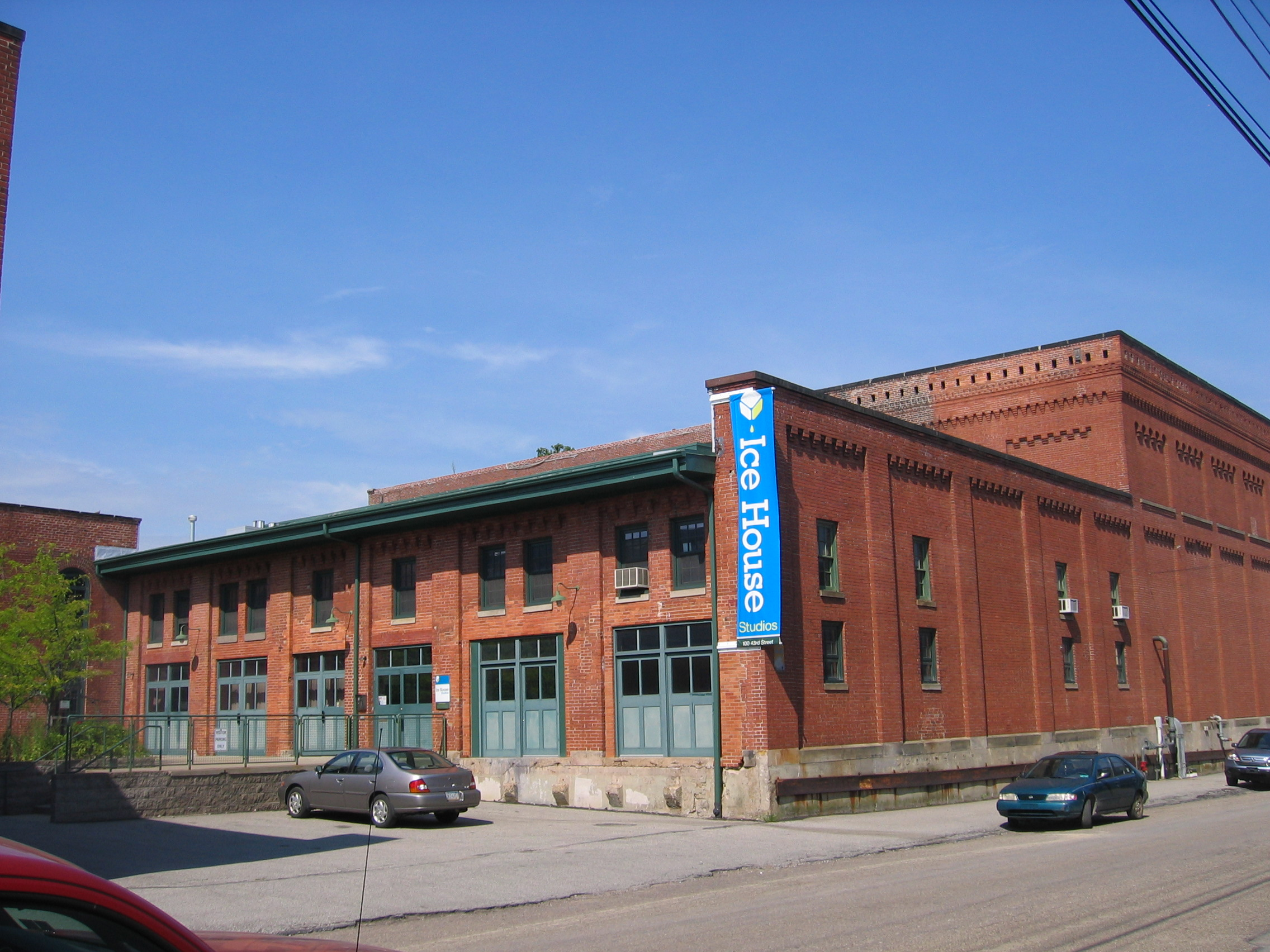

- Location within Pittsburgh Location within Pennsylvania Location within the United States
- Location: 100 43rd St., Pittsburgh, Pennsylvania
- Coordinates: 40°28′28″N 79°57′51″W
- Area: less than one acre
- Built: 1907
- Architectural style: Romanesque, Renaissance
- Part of: Lawrenceville Historic District (ID100004020)
- NRHP reference No.: 00001348

Significant dates
- Added to NRHP: November 8, 2000
- Designated CP: July 8, 2019

The Consolidated Ice Company Factory No. 2 was built in 1907 in the Lawrenceville neighborhood of Pittsburgh, Pennsylvania. The site includes a two-story office building and an ice manufacturing plant. The factory was closed in 1951.

The site was listed on the National Register of Historic Places in 2000.
