= Bayard School =

- U.S. National Register of Historic Places
- U.S. Historic district – Contributing property
- Pittsburgh Historic Designation
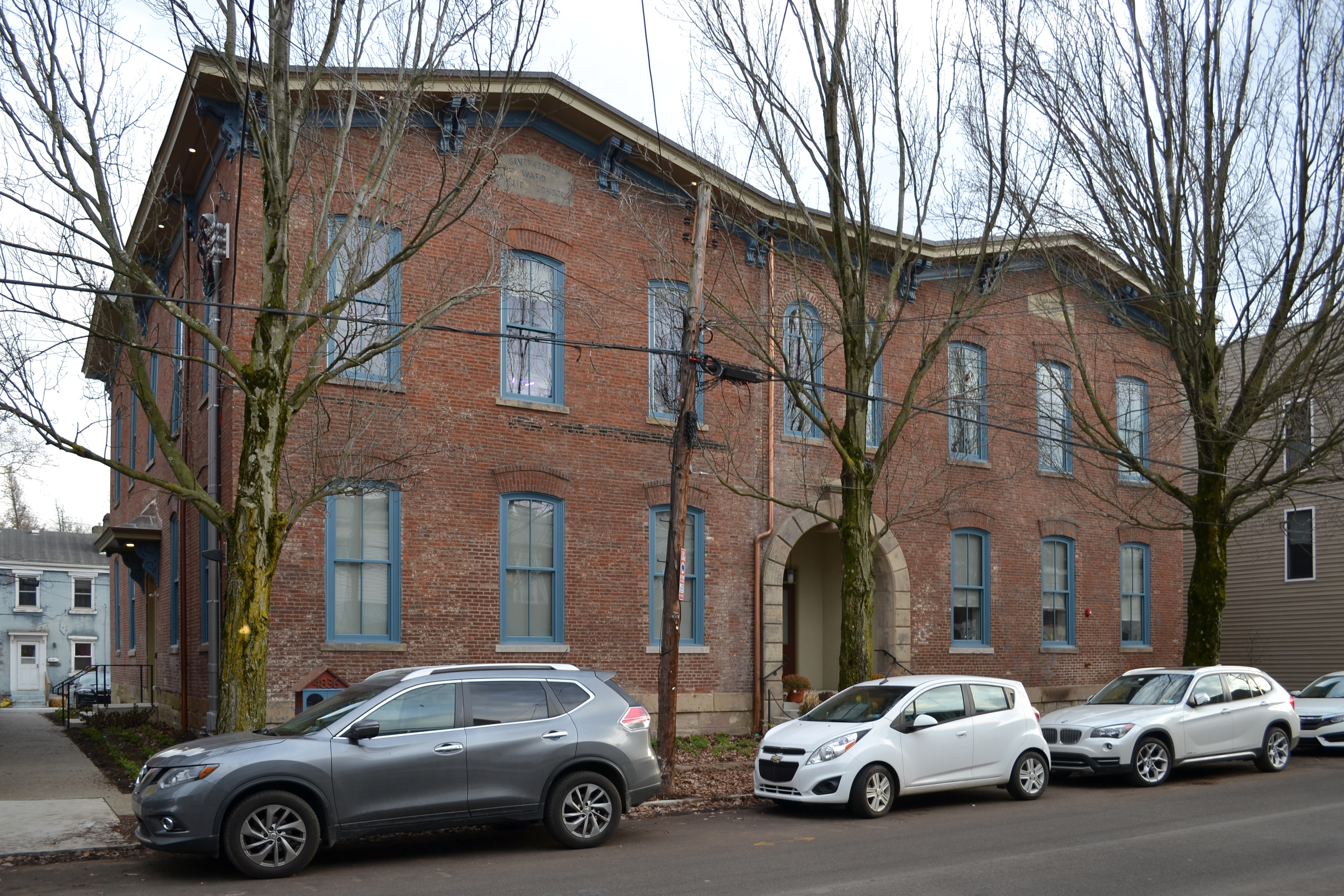
- The renovated school building in 2018

- Location within Pittsburgh Location within Pennsylvania Location within the United States
- Location: 4830 Hatfield St., Pittsburgh, Pennsylvania
- Coordinates: 40°28′37″N 79°57′29″W
- Area: 1 acre (0.40 ha)
- Built: 1874
- Architectural style: Italianate
- Part of: Lawrenceville Historic District (ID100004020)
- MPS: Pittsburgh Public Schools TR
- NRHP reference No.: 86002649

Significant dates
- Added to NRHP: September 30, 1986
- Designated CP: July 8, 2019

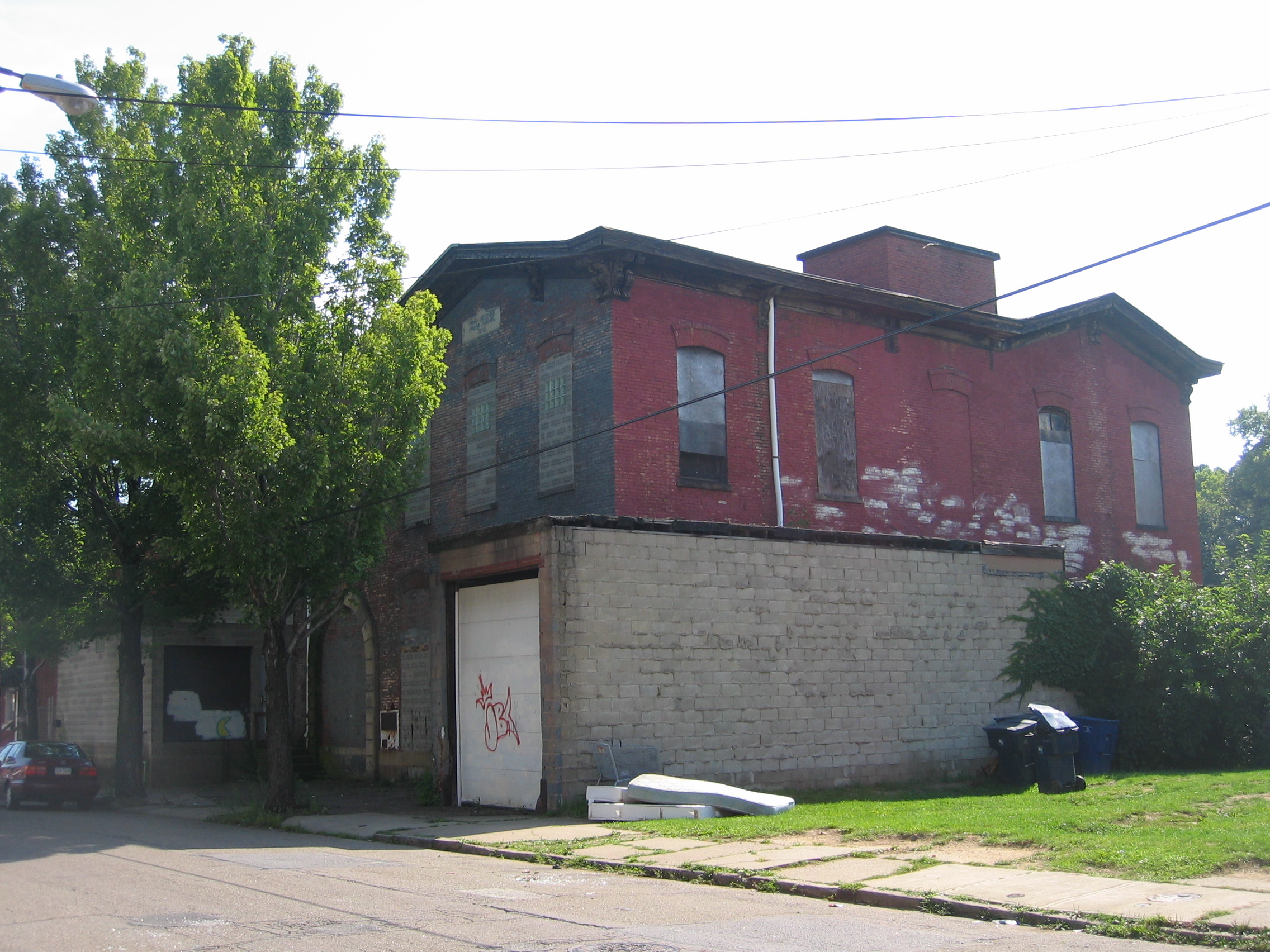
The school as it appeared before being renovated

The Bayard School in the Lawrenceville neighborhood of Pittsburgh, Pennsylvania is a building from 1874 and is one of Pittsburgh's oldest surviving school buildings. The school was closed in 1939, along with the nearby Foster School and Lawrence School, when all students were transferred to the new elementary wing of Arsenal Junior High School. It was sold in 1941 and later used as a warehouse. It was listed on the National Register of Historic Places in 1986.

After being vacant for a number of years, the school building was renovated and converted into loft apartments in 2018.
