= Marion M. Steen =

American architect

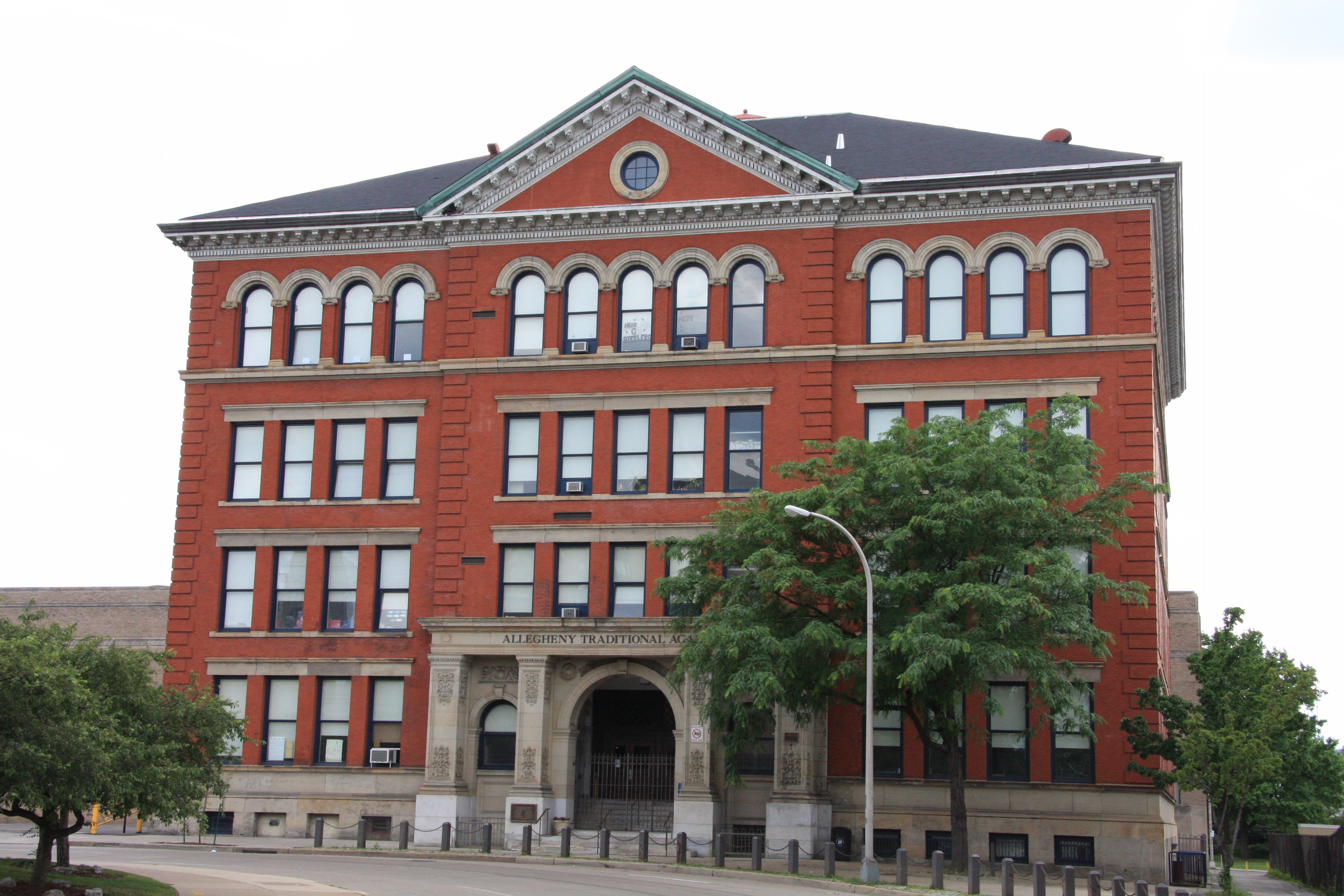
Allegheny High School, built 1904

Marion M. Steen (May 16, 1886 – June 28, 1966) was a Pittsburgh-based architect associated with a number of schools in the area.

== Biography ==
=== Early life and work ===
Steen was born the son of James Steen (died 1923), a notable Pittsburgh-based architect. Along with his brother, James H. Steen, he joined his father in the family architectural firm, James T. Steen & Sons, while still in his teens. He graduated in 1908 from Carnegie Tech. He served as Staff Architect and Superintendent of Buildings for Pittsburgh's School Board during the 1930s, and designed and supervised the building of 23 schools and additions. He retired in 1954.

=== Works ===
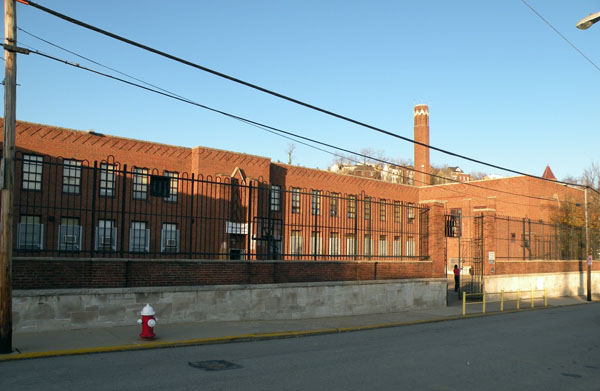
Schiller Elementary School (1939)

A number of his works designated as Pittsburgh Landmarks and some are listed on the U.S. National Register of Historic Places. His NRHP-listed works include Allegheny High School (1904), Letsche Elementary School (1905), Washington Vocational School (1908), Knoxville Junior High School (1927), Prospect Junior High and Elementary School (1931), Arsenal Junior High School (1931), Conroy Junior High School, Lemington Elementary School (1937) and Schiller Elementary School (1939). The Pittsburgh History & Landmarks Foundation described his work on the latter, located on the Peralta and Wettach Streets in East Dutchtown, as "a fine essay in the use of deep-red textured brickwork, laid to produce zigzag Modernistic ornament." Other notable buildings include Concord Elementary School (1939, in the Carrick neighborhood of Pittsburgh), Stevens Elementary School (1940, in the Elliott neighborhood of Pittsburgh), the Washington Polytechnic Academy (Washington School) in Lawrenceville and the Weil Technology Institute (1942).
