= Washington Crossing Bridge (Pittsburgh) =

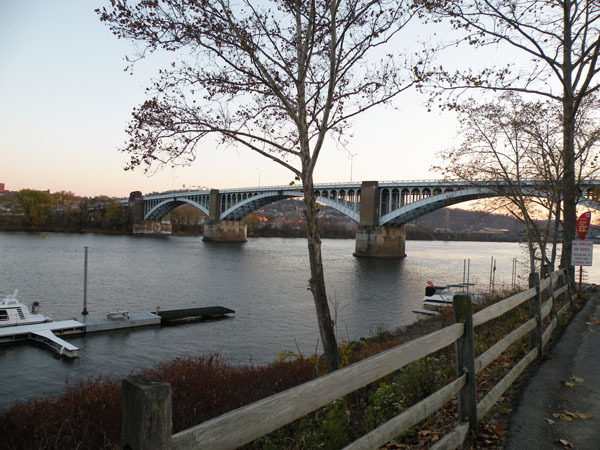
- Coordinates: 40.4728°N 79.9686°W
- Carries: 40th Street
- Crosses: Allegheny River
- Locale: Pittsburgh and Millvale
- Other name: 40th Street Bridge
- Maintained by: Pennsylvania Department of Transportation

Characteristics
- Design: Arch bridge
- Material: Steel
- Total length: 2,366 feet (721 m)
- Width: 3 lanes
- Longest span: 360 feet (110 m)
- Piers in water: 4
- Clearance below: 72.5 feet (22.1 m)

History
- Designer: Benno Janssen, Janssen & Cocken
- Opened: 1924
- Washington Crossing Bridge
- U.S. National Register of Historic Places
- U.S. Historic district – Contributing property
- Pittsburgh Landmark – PHLF
- Part of: Lawrenceville Historic District (ID100004020)
- NRHP reference No.: 88000820

Significant dates
- Added to NRHP: June 22, 1988
- Designated CP: July 8, 2019
- Designated PHLF: 2004

Location
- Interactive map of Washington Crossing Bridge

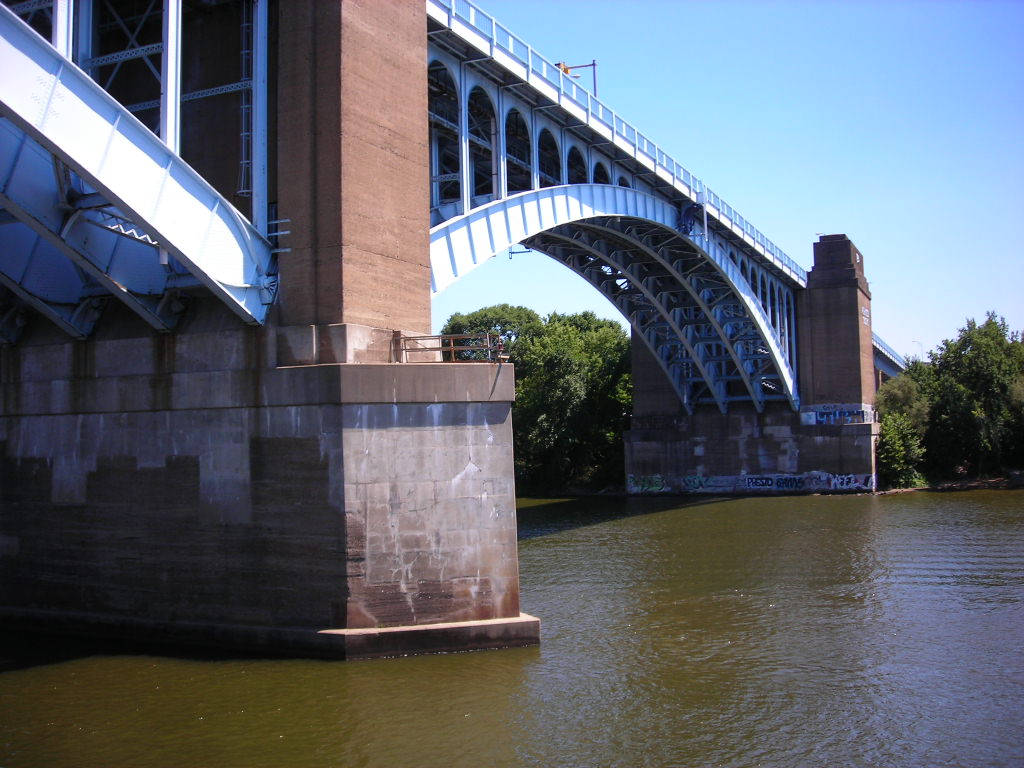

The Washington Crossing Bridge, commonly known as the Fortieth Street Bridge, is an arch bridge that carries vehicular traffic across the Allegheny River between the Pittsburgh neighborhood of Lawrenceville and the suburb of Millvale. The bridge is decorated with the seals representing the original 13 states of the United States and that of Allegheny County.

== History ==
Erected between 1919 and late 1924, and officially opened on December 29, 1924, the Washington Crossing Bridge was originally built to accommodate two lanes of traffic and one streetcar line. Its estimated cost upon completion was $2,344,000.

A 1982 re-decking allowed for the creation of a reversible third automobile lane.

The bridge received its name because it is located at a historically significant site pertaining to George Washington's military career. In 1753, then-Major Washington was dispatched to give French forces an ultimatum to negotiate for the return of the lands that today make up Western Pennsylvania to the British or to prepare for a military strike. Crossing the Allegheny on a wooden raft, Washington was nearly killed when his vessel overturned at this site.

== See also ==
- List of bridges documented by the Historic American Engineering Record in Pennsylvania
- List of crossings of the Allegheny River
