= Boys' Club of Pittsburgh =

- U.S. National Register of Historic Places
- U.S. Historic district – Contributing property
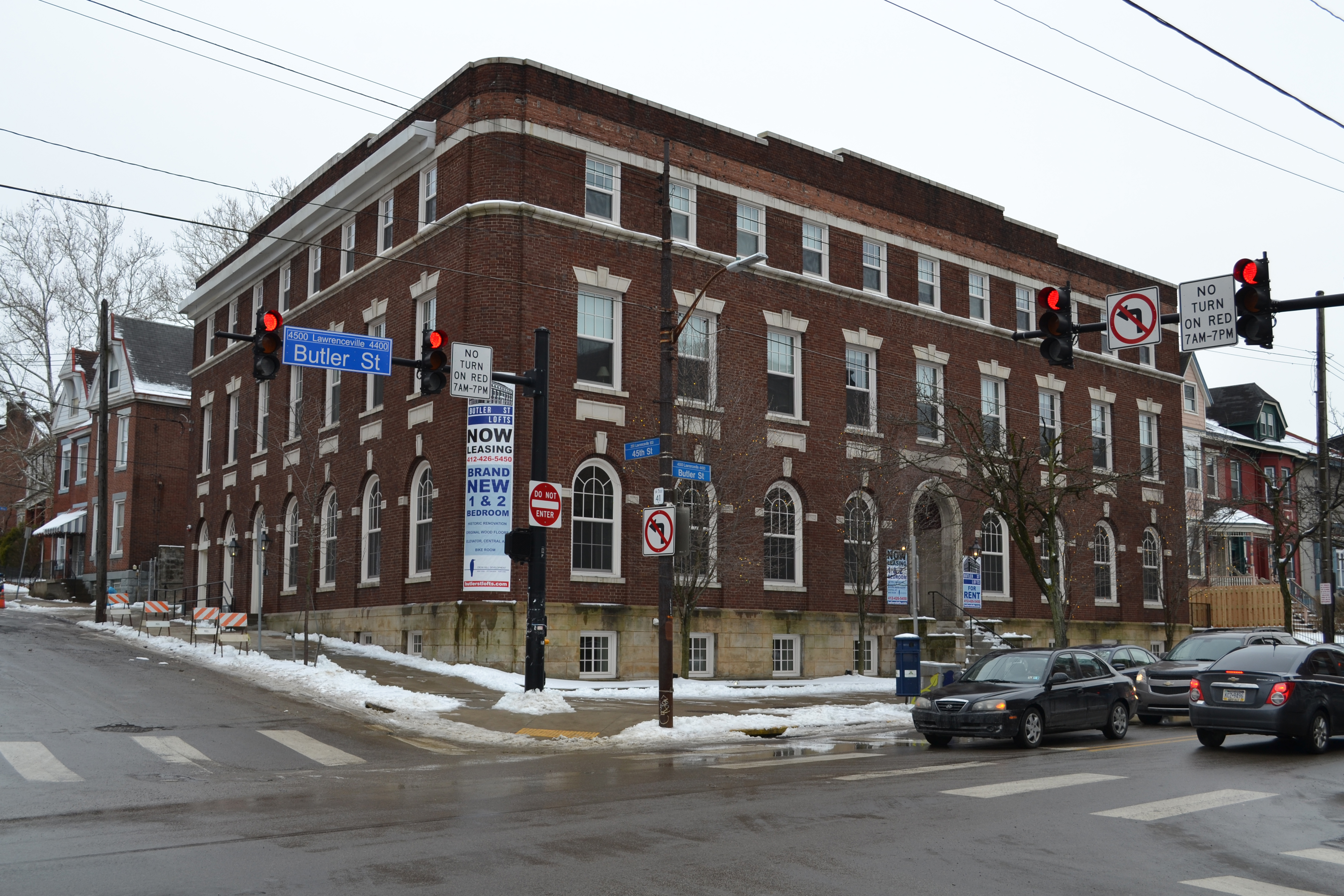

- Location within Pittsburgh Location within Pennsylvania Location within the United States
- Location: 212 45th St., Pittsburgh, Pennsylvania
- Coordinates: 40°28′19″N 79°57′33″W
- Built: 1912
- Part of: Lawrenceville Historic District (ID100004020)
- NRHP reference No.: 100001976

Significant dates
- Added to NRHP: January 19, 2018
- Designated CP: July 8, 2019

The Boys' Club of Pittsburgh is a historic building in the Lawrenceville neighborhood of Pittsburgh, Pennsylvania. Built in 1912 as the Lawrenceville YMCA, the three-story building was designed by local architect Robert Trimble and originally included a gymnasium, swimming pool, bowling alley, and dormitories. In 1928 the building was sold to the Pittsburgh Boys' Club, which became part of the Boys & Girls Clubs of America. The Boys & Girls Club continued to use the building until 2000, when a new facility was completed two blocks away. Subsequently, the older building was occupied by a charter school until 2014 and then converted into apartments. It was listed on the National Register of Historic Places in 2018.
