= Arsenal Middle School =

- Arsenal School
- U.S. National Register of Historic Places
- U.S. Historic district – Contributing property
- Pittsburgh Historic Designation
- Pittsburgh Landmark – PHLF
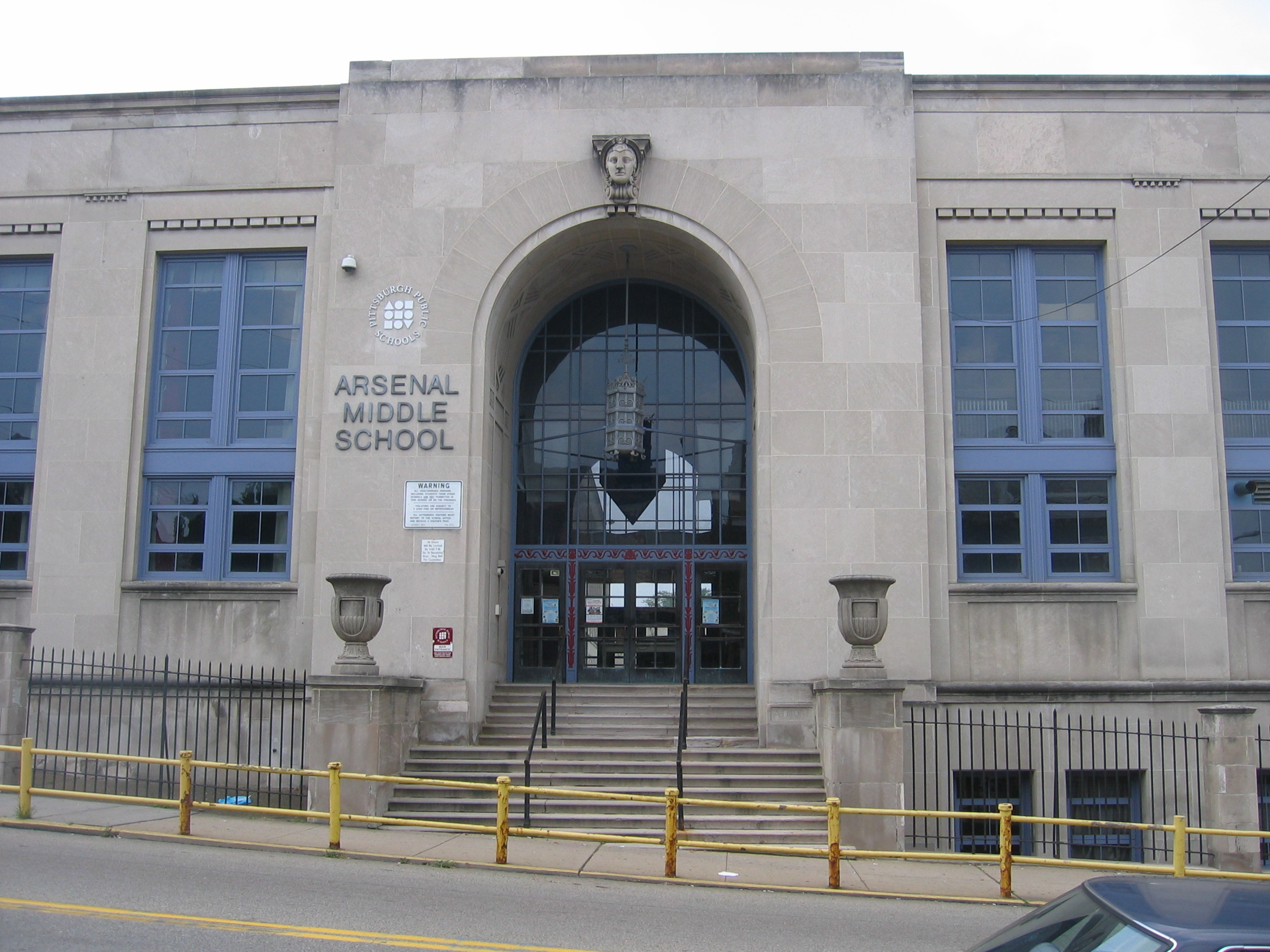

- Location within Pittsburgh Location within Pennsylvania Location within the United States
- Location: 220 40th St, Pittsburgh, Pennsylvania
- Coordinates: 40°28′3″N 79°57′46″W
- Area: 3 acres (1.2 ha)
- Built: 1931–32
- Architect: Schwab, Palmgreen & Merrick (original); Marion M. Steen (1939 addition)
- Architectural style: Classical Revival
- Website: Arsenal Middle School
- Part of: Lawrenceville Historic District (ID100004020)
- MPS: Pittsburgh Public Schools TR
- NRHP reference No.: 86002645

Significant dates
- Added to NRHP: September 30, 1986
- Designated CP: July 8, 2019
- Designated CPHS: November 30, 1999
- Designated PHLF: 2001

The Arsenal School (also known as Arsenal PreK-5 and Arsenal 6-8) is a public elementary/middle school and historic building in the Lower Lawrenceville neighborhood of Pittsburgh, Pennsylvania. The building originally opened in 1932 as a junior high school, with the elementary school addition completed in 1939. It stands on part of the former site of the Allegheny Arsenal.

The Arsenal School was added to the National Register of Historic Places in 1986 and was listed as a contributing property in the Lawrenceville Historic District in 2019. It is also a City of Pittsburgh historic structure and a Pittsburgh History and Landmarks Foundation Historic Landmark. In 2004, a Pennsylvania state historical marker was placed at the school's athletic field to honor Johnny Unitas, who played there for the semi-professional Bloomfield Rams prior to his Hall of Fame career in the National Football League.

== History ==
The land on which the school was built was part of the Allegheny Arsenal, which manufactured munitions for the U.S. military during the American Civil War and was the site of a deadly explosion in 1862. In the early 1900s, a large section of the arsenal became surplus property and was turned into Arsenal Park. Some of the former arsenal buildings in the lower portion of the park were refurbished in 1908 to build a testing station for the U.S. Geological Survey (USGS). This facility was engaged in various areas of research, particularly mine safety.

In 1912, Lawrenceville residents petitioned the school board for a high school in their neighborhood. In order to achieve this, the school board negotiated a land swap whereby the federal government received a parcel on Forbes Avenue (which became the U.S. Bureau of Mines Central Experiment Station) in exchange for the former USGS property. The school board planned to eventually build a junior high school on the site, but in the interim the property was used as a vocational school starting in 1926. In 1930, to clear the way for the planned junior high school, the vocational students were reassigned to the Washington School, which eventually became a vocational school exclusively.

Excavation work for the new school began in January, 1931, and the cornerstone was laid on June 11, 1931. Anthony Greco, a bricklaying student from the vocational school, performed the ceremony. The completed building was dedicated on November 4, 1932. In 1939, a new wing for elementary students was completed, absorbing the students who previously attended the Bayard, Foster, and Lawrence elementary schools.

=== Arsenal Middle School ===
For most of its history, the Arsenal building has housed two separate schools, one for middle-grade students and one for elementary students. Although located in the same building, they are separate schools with separate administrations.

The middle-grade school began as Arsenal Junior High in 1932. In 1957, the school was abruptly shut down and converted into a girls' vocational high school after a fire destroyed the Bellefield vocational school in Oakland. The 390 Bellefield students were transferred to Arsenal and the existing seventh, eighth, and ninth-grade students were reassigned to other schools to make room for them. This arrangement continued until 1969, when Pittsburgh Public Schools began adopting the middle school concept and chose Arsenal as the site for one of its new middle schools. The school was renovated and reopened as Arsenal Middle School in 1971. Now known as Arsenal 6–8, the school remains in operation with an enrollment of 146 as of 2024.

=== Arsenal Elementary School ===
Arsenal Elementary opened in 1939. In 1954, it was the site of the first large-scale testing of Jonas Salk's experimental polio vaccine, with shots administered to 135 first, second, and third-grade students.

In 1980, Pittsburgh Public Schools decided to close Arsenal Elementary as part of its desegregation plan, with students being bused to Fort Pitt Elementary instead. In 2002, Arsenal Elementary reopened. The school is now known as Arsenal PreK–5 and has an enrollment of 276 as of 2024.

== Architecture ==
The Arsenal School is a C-shaped building organized around a central athletic field. Each arm of the C is two stories high, while the perpendicular central section is four stories. The whole building rests on a basement level which is partially exposed on the street elevations and fully exposed on the interior playing field side. The original L-shaped junior high section was designed by the local firm of Schwab, Palmgreen, & Merick, a partnership between Harvey A. Schwab (1887–1956), Charles J. Palmgreen (1882–1961), and Frederick Ickes Merrick (1876–1960). The later elementary wing at the west end of the building was designed by Marion M. Steen. However, the elementary wing was planned from the beginning and Steen's section closely matches the existing architecture.

Stylistically, the building is an example of the PWA Moderne or "stripped classical" style, a hybrid of Neoclassical and Art Deco architecture which was popular for public buildings in the 1930s. The building is faced with limestone and sparsely ornamented with classical motifs. The windows are arranged in vertical bands with recessed spandrels. The main entrance on 40th Street has a double-height arched entryway decorated with geometric patterns, a keystone with a sculpted face, and ornamental urns.
