= NeighborWorks America =

Nonprofit organization for community development

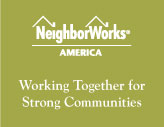
- Type: Nonprofit - Congressionally Chartered
- Industry: Affordable Housing and Community Development
- Founded: 1978
- Headquarters: Washington, DC, US
- Key people: Marietta Rodriguez, president & CEO; Lee Anne Adams, executive vice president & chief operating officer; Kemba Esmond, executive vice president & chief financial officer; Nakeasha Sanders-Small, executive vice president & general counsel; Lance Schine, interim executive vice president & chief information officer
- Products: NeighborWorks Compass; CounselorMax; Organizational Assessment Services; Success Measures; Training; Achieving Excellence Program
- Operating income: US $312,437,291 (FY 2015)
- Website: www.neighborworks.org

Neighborhood Reinvestment Corporation, doing business as NeighborWorks® America, is a congressionally chartered, national nonprofit organization that supports affordable housing and community development across the United States. Through grant funding, professional training, peer learning, technical assistance, research and strategic partnerships, NeighborWorks America strengthens a network of nearly 250 independent nonprofit organizations serving urban, suburban, rural communities in every state, the District of Columbia, Puerto Rico, and on Native lands.

NeighborWorks America supports affordable housing and community development through grant funding, professional learning, organizational support, peer learning, research and national initiatives that strengthen local nonprofit organizations and the communities they serve. The organization administers several national grant and housing counseling initiatives, including the National Foreclosure Mitigation Counseling Program, the Housing Stability Counseling Program and the NeighborWorks Flexible Impact Grants program. Through these and other initiatives, NeighborWorks America helps expand and preserve affordable housing, promote sustainable homeownership, strengthen organizational strength, support resident leadership and advance community resilience nationwide.

== Governance ==
The Neighborhood Reinvestment Corporation Board of Directors consists of federal officials and private-sector directors appointed under the corporation's congressional charter.

=== Executive leadership ===
Executive directors

- Bill Whiteside (1978–1990), first executive director
- George Knight (1990–2000), later inducted into the Affordable Housing Hall of Fame
- Ellen Lazar (2000–2003)

Chief executive officers

- Kenneth Wade (2004–2011)
- Eileen Fitzgerald (2011–2014)
- Paul Weech (2014–2017)
- Marietta Rodriguez (2018–present), president & CEO

== History ==
=== Origins and foundation ===
The origins of NeighborWorks America trace to the late 1960s, when resident leader Dorothy Mae Richardson organized her neighbors in Pittsburgh's Central North Side neighborhood to improve deteriorating housing conditions. Working alongside residents, lenders, public officials and community partners, Richardson helped establish a collaborative model for neighborhood revitalization that later became Neighborhood Housing Services of Pittsburgh. The model was replicated nationwide and became the foundation for the NeighborWorks network.

=== Federal charter and national visibility ===
In 1978, Congress chartered the Neighborhood Reinvestment Corporation, with a mission to recreate the NHS housing program throughout the nation.

In 1984, the first Neighborhood Housing Week (now called NeighborWorks Week) was congressionally established. President Ronald Reagan proclaimed a national observance.

During the 1980s, the Ad Council collaborated with Neighborhood Reinvestment Corporation (NRC) to create "NeighborWorks."

The NRC began doing business as NeighborWorks America in 2005.

=== Programs and initiatives ===
NeighborWorks America supports community development through:

– Grant funding for NeighborWorks network organizations - Professional learning through the NeighborWorks Training Institute and other learning opportunities - Housing counseling - Community development research - Peer learning - Organizational capacity building - Disaster recovery and resilience initiatives - Community and resident leadership development

=== Scope ===
There are nearly 250 NeighborWorks organizations operating in urban, suburban, and rural communities in 50 states, the District of Columbia,Puerto Rico, and on Native lands. Together, the organization and its network leverage federal investment with public and private capital to expand affordable housing, strengthen local organizations and improve community outcomes nationwide.

In fiscal year 2025, the NeighborWorks network leveraged $74 in investment for every $1 of congressional appropriation. Network organizations helped create more than 17,600 new homeowners, provided 216,800 affordable rental homes, repaired 66,900 homes, preserved housing for 11,400 homeowners and constructed, acquired or preserved 11,500 rental homes. The network also provided housing and financial capability counseling or education to 102,900 customers, issued 16,100 professional training certificates to housing and community development practitioners and helped create or support 48,700 jobs in communities across the United States.

== Community leaders ==
Resident leadership has remained a defining principle of NeighborWorks America since its founding. Each year, the organization presents the Dorothy Richardson Award for Resident Leadership to recognize residents whose leadership has strengthened their communities.

== Research and thought leadership ==
NeighborWorks America serves as a national source of research and data on affordable housing and community development. The organization publishes original research, national surveys, impact reports and case studies that examine housing supply, homeownership, consumer finance, community development, rural housing, neighborhood revitalization and organizational capacity. Its research draws on the experiences of the NeighborWorks network and communities across the country to identify emerging trends, evaluate effective practices and inform housing policy and community development strategies. The organization also develops practical resources and toolkits to help nonprofit organizations, lenders, local governments and other partners strengthen housing outcomes and build more resilient communities.

== Professional learning ==
NeighborWorks America is one of the nation's leading providers of professional development for housing and community development practitioners through the NeighborWorks Training Institute, regional training events and online learning.

== See also ==
- Title 24 of the Code of Federal Regulations
