= Florida's Tribute to the Women of the Confederacy =

Outdoor memorial to Confederate women in Jacksonville, Florida's Springfield Park

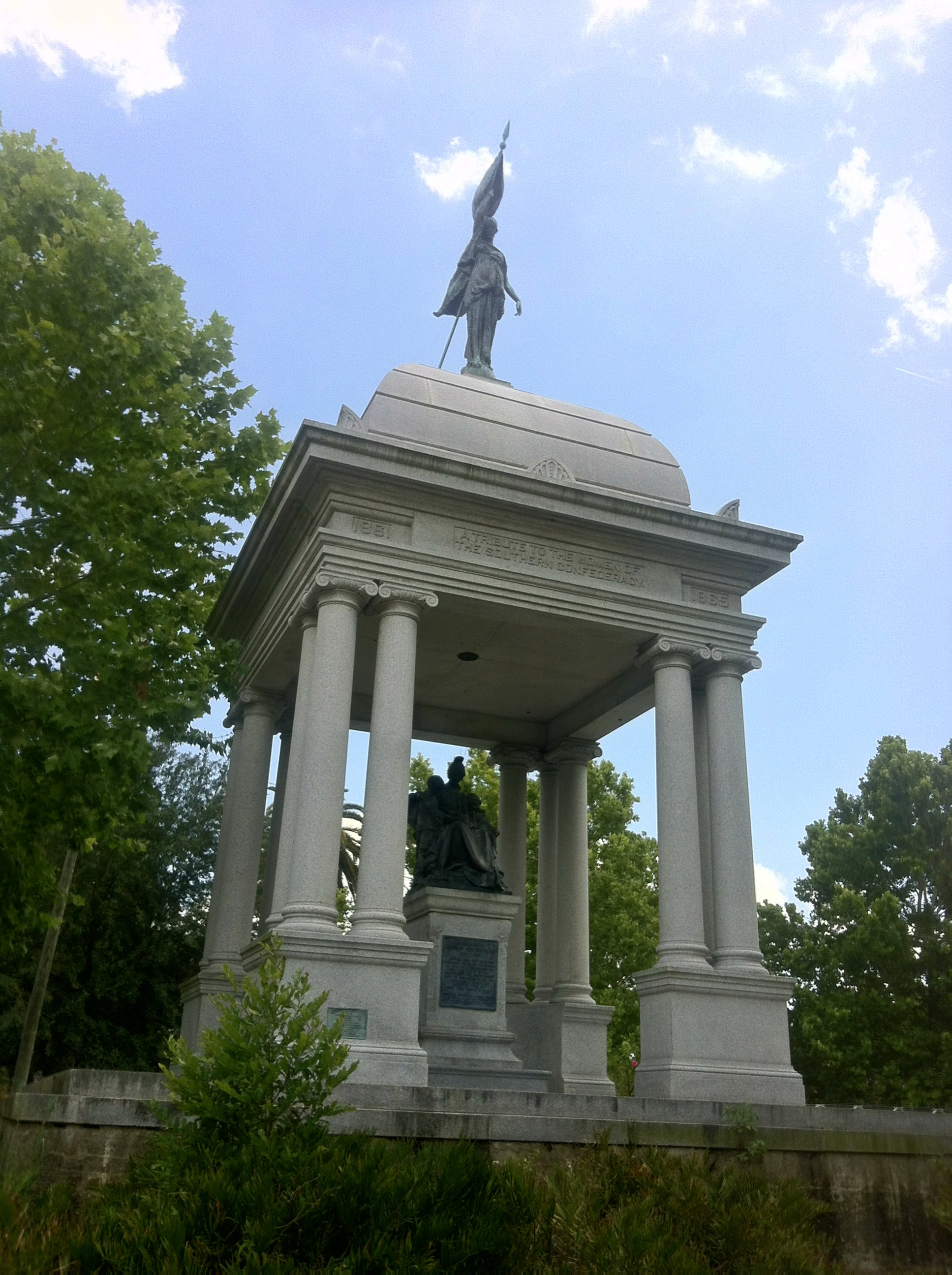
- The monument in 2013
- Interactive map of Florida's Tribute to the Women of the Confederacy
- Location: Jacksonville, Florida, U.S.
- Coordinates: 30°20′05″N 81°39′16″W
- Designer: Allen George Newman
- Type: Sculpture

Florida's Tribute to the Women of the Confederacy, also known as A Tribute to the Women of the Southern Confederacy and the Monument to the Women of the Confederacy, was an outdoor Confederate memorial installed in Jacksonville, Florida's Springfield Park.

The memorial was erected in 1915, during the peak of Confederate monument-building, part of widespread campaigns to promote and justify Jim Crow laws in the South. A plaque says the memorial honors women of the Confederate states who "sacrificed their all upon their country's altar" during the Confederacy's 1861-65 war to secede from the United States.

On December 27, 2023, the large statue in the monument and the smaller one on top were removed by order of Donna Deegan, the mayor of Jacksonville.

== Description and history ==
In 1912, the Florida division of the United Confederate Veterans voted to ask each Confederate veteran to contribute $5 (equivalent to $163 in 2024) to fund a monument to the Confederacy's women, "who were the heroines of that struggle".

The monument was designed in 1914 by sculptor Allen George Newman (1875–1940), and dedicated on October 26, 1915. The memorial's bronze sculptures were cast by Jno. Williams, Inc. and McNeel Marble Works served as the work's contractor.

Such early-20th-century Confederate memorials were "part and parcel of the initiation of legally mandated segregation and widespread disenfranchisement across the South", the American Historical Association (AHA) wrote in 2017. They "were intended, in part, to obscure the terrorism required to overthrow Reconstruction, and to intimidate African Americans politically and isolate them from the mainstream of public life."

In 1992, the memorial's condition was deemed "treatment needed" by the Smithsonian Institution's "Save Outdoor Sculpture!" program.

=== Removal efforts ===
In May 2018, the monument was cited among those targeted by the March for Change, a three-day, 40-mile (64-km) protest against Confederate monuments in Jacksonville and St. Augustine, Florida. It is No. 10 on the Make It Right Project's list of Confederate memorials it wants to see removed.

In 2021, Jacksonville Mayor Lenny Curry requested $1.3 million to dismantle the memorial, but the city council blocked the request. In 2022, the council adopted a one-year plan to host "community conversations" by mid-year; as of December, no such meetings had been held.

Ultimately, the Jessie Ball duPont Fund and anonymous donors donated $187,000 to 904WARD, a nonprofit organization, so that the statues on the monument could be removed. The removal work was done by ACON Construction on December 27, 2023.

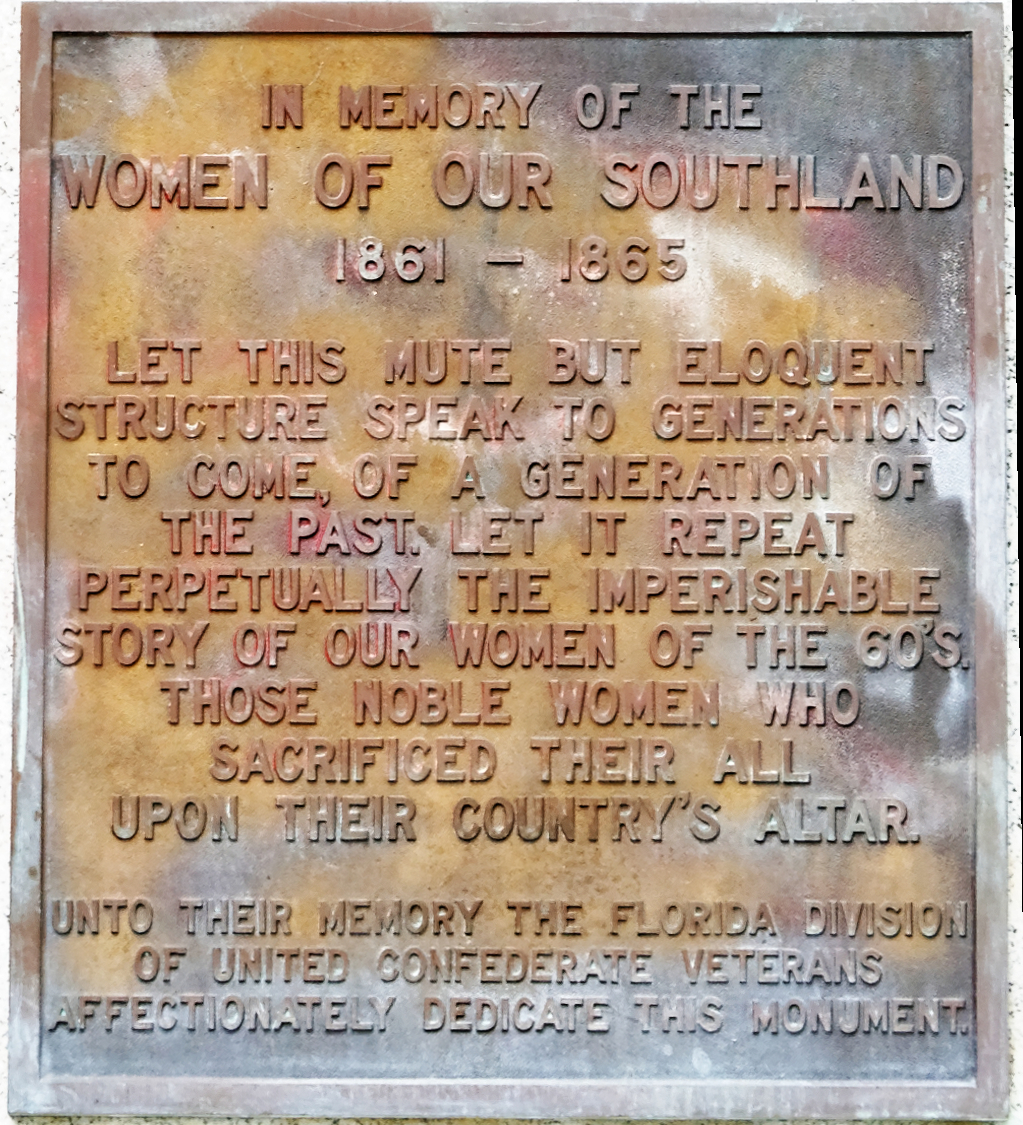
Plaque

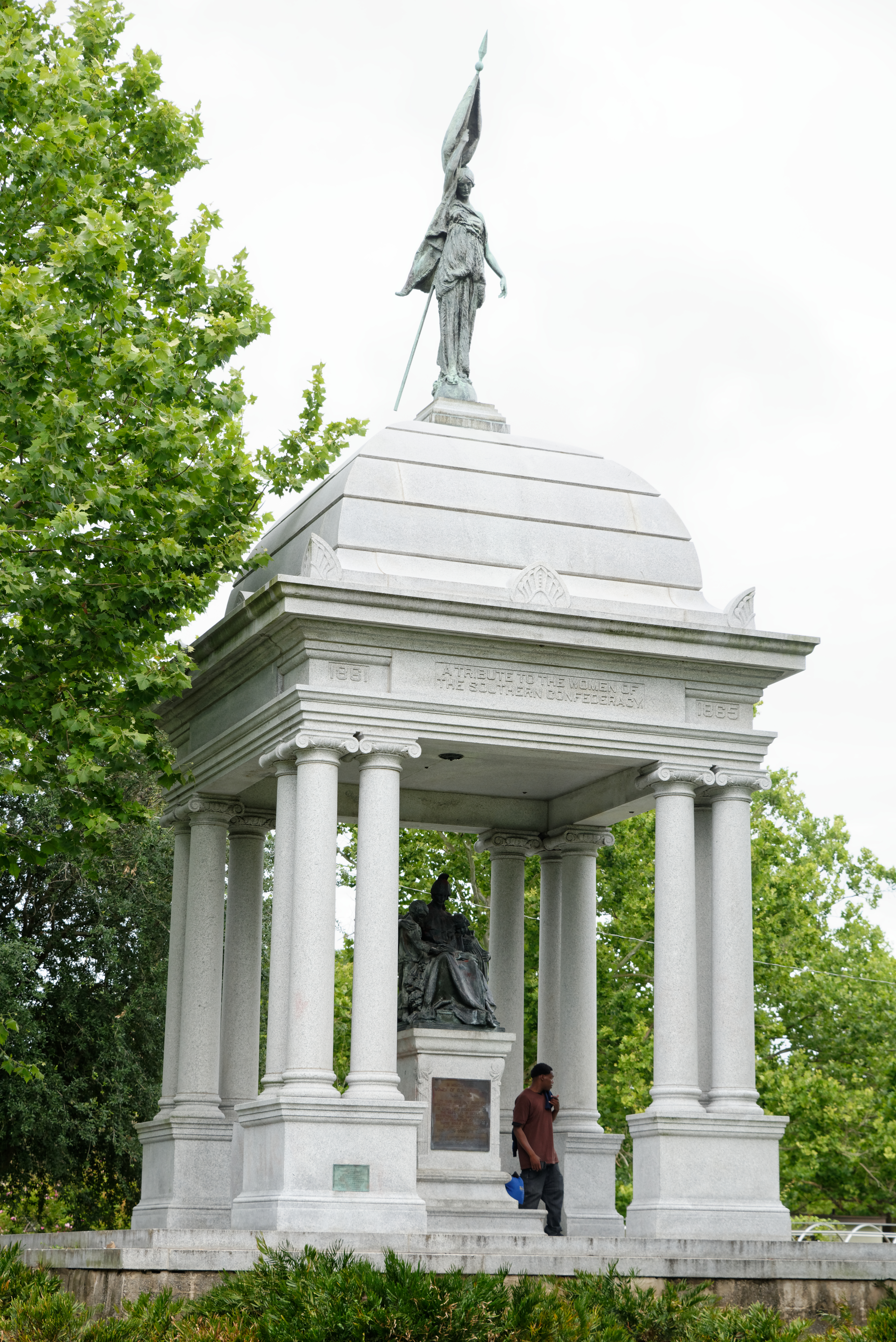
In May 2018

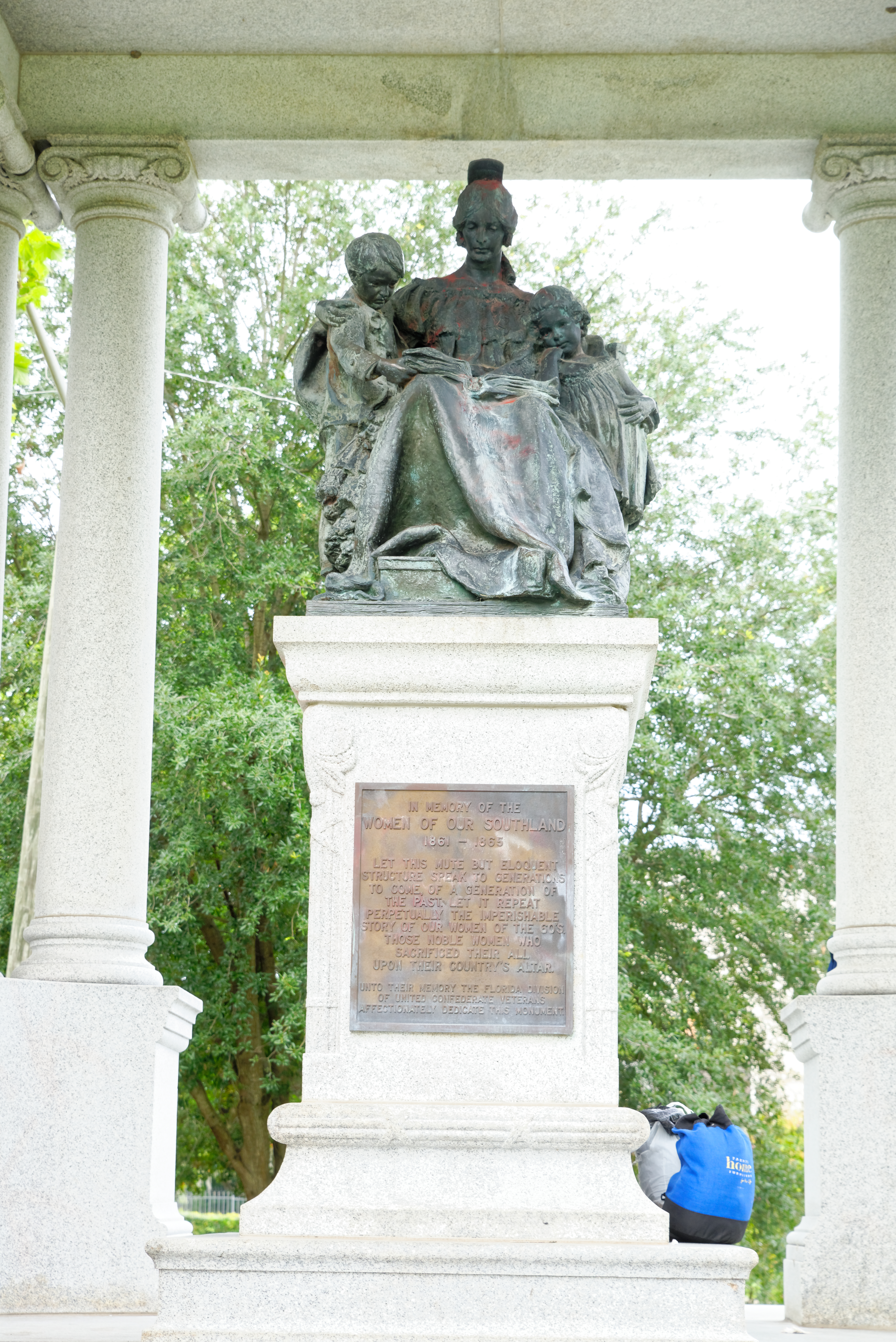
Inside

== See also ==
- 1915 in art
- List of Confederate monuments and memorials
- Removal of Confederate monuments and memorials
