= The Hiker =

The Hiker may refer to either of two statues, each installed in numerous locations throughout the United States, both dedicated to the US soldiers who fought in the Spanish–American War, the Philippine–American War, and other related conflicts.

- For the statue by Theo Alice Ruggles Kitson, see The Hiker (Kitson)
- For the statue by Allen George Newman, see The Hiker (Newman)

The Hiker may also refer to:

- "The Hiker", a song by Scottish musician Momus from his 2015 album Turpsycore
