= The Hiker (Newman) =

Statue by Allen George Newman

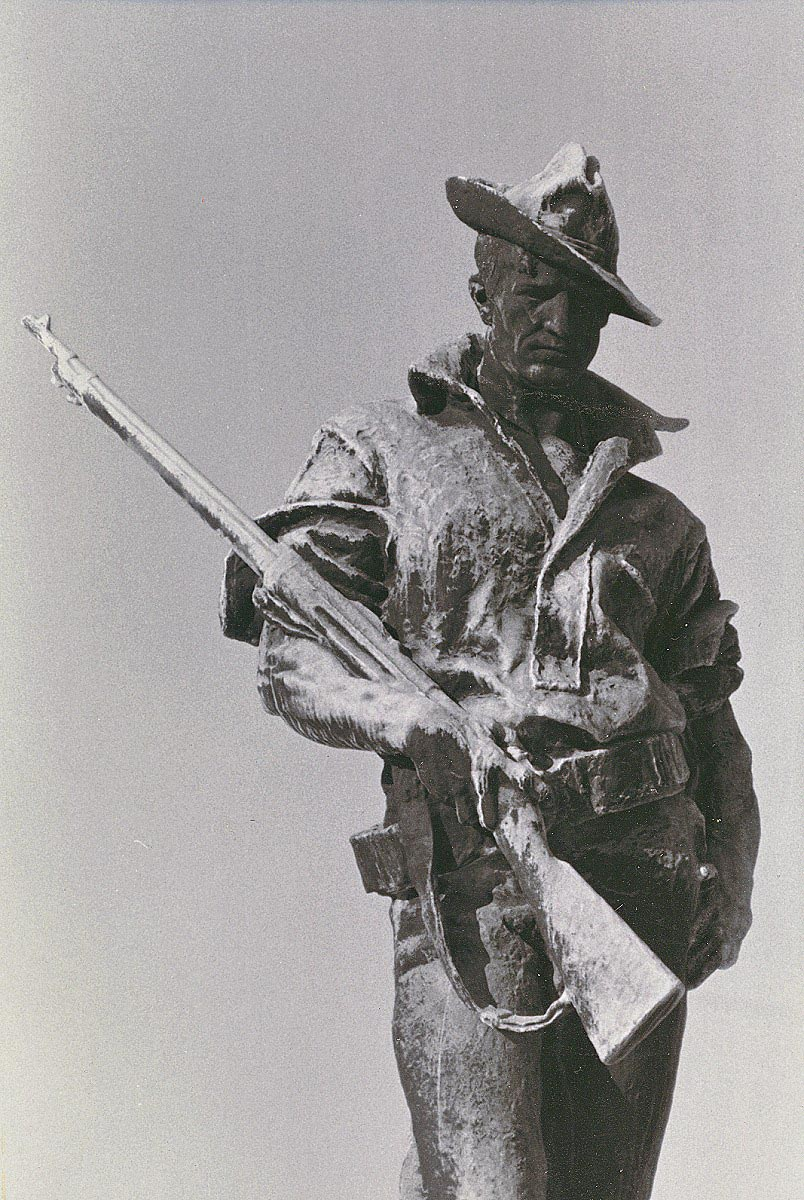
The Hiker, Ypsilanti, Michigan

The Hiker is a statue created by Allen George Newman. Like Theo Alice Ruggles Kitson's statue of the same name, it was created to honor the American soldiers who took "long hikes in steaming jungles" during the Boxer Rebellion, the Spanish–American War and the Philippine–American War. Originally displayed in the New York building at the 1907 Jamestown Exposition, the statue was chosen by several camps of the United Spanish War Veterans to be erected as war memorials.

The statue, described as ”The best bronze soldier in America” by sculptor and critic Lorado Taft, proved to be very popular, copies of it being located in numerous cities. The Jno. Williams, Inc. foundry in New York City was “given exclusive rights for casting the statue ‘in real bronze’ “ adding that the sculptor Newman would “with great pleasure give his advice gratis as to the proper form for the pedestal according to its environment.”

The head is strongly poised on a sinewy column. The shoulders are broad, the chest full and deep. The flanks are thin, the hips narrow. The muscular legs show great marching capacity... There is a suggestion at the bow of the knee that he could ride a horse. His trusty Krag is not the first gun he has handled. You will not find that position in the manual, though the muzzle is elevated. It is equally handy to be aimed, clubbed or lunged. His head turns naturally a little to the right to balance the hat brim falling to the left. But the face is smooth shaven as was the mode—every part is strong, every feature clean cut, and all smoothly balanced. The lined cheeks show that in his 28 years he has lived. He is no saint. He is no molly-coddle. He is an American soldier. He is a disciplined man at arms, the wonder of the world today wherever such foregather. — Gen. Charles Wheaton Abbot, Jr., in his dedication of the statue at the North Burial Ground, Providence, Rhode Island, May 31, 1912.

== Locations ==
Location	City/State	Coordinates	Image	Installed	Notes/References
Munson-Williams-Proctor Arts Institute	Utica, New York			1904	Reduced size (28 inches); First bronze cast of Newman's plaster maquette.
New-York Historical Society	New York, New York			1904	Reduced size (28.25 x 10.75 x 10 inches)
New York State Building, Jamestown Exposition	Jamestown, Virginia			1907 (temporary)	Heroic size (9 ft / 2 m), probably plaster Current location unknown
Spanish–American War Memorial, North Burial Ground	Providence, Rhode Island	41.845286°N 71.408567°W		Memorial Day 1912	First installation of the statue as a memorial.
Washington Park; Relocated to Tompkinsville Park, 1925	Staten Island, New York	40.63766°N 74.0765°W		1912	Second installation of the statue as a memorial.
Bayonne Park	Bayonne, New Jersey	40.67942°N 74.11325°W		Labor Day 1912	Third installation of the statue as a memorial.
Hiker Park	Newark, New Jersey	40.72185°N 74.1933°W		1914	Statue and plaques were stolen in January 1980. The torso was later recovered, but the statue deemed beyond repair. The base remains.
Intersection of Memorial Parkway and Oneida Street	Utica, New York	43.08649°N 75.25025°W		1915	
In front of the Post Office	Monongahela, Pennsylvania	40.20239°N 79.92659°W		1915	
Roosevelt Plaza	Buffalo, New York	42.88852°N 78.8733°W		1920	
Grove Street Park	Pawtucket, Rhode Island	41.87912°N 71.37763°W		1922	
Greenridge Cemetery	Saratoga Springs, New York	43.07144°N 73.78603°W		1923	
Intersection of Hook and Hamilton Streets	Southbridge, Massachusetts	42.07705°N 72.03407°W		1923	
Wilcox Park	Westerly, Rhode Island	41.3778°N 71.82751°W		1924	
Woodland Park Zoo	Seattle, Washington	47.66581°N 122.35309°W (Approximate)		1924	
Schenley Drive at the Frick Fine Arts Building	Pittsburgh, Pennsylvania	40.44185°N 79.95051°W		1925	
Court Square	Woonsocket, Rhode Island	42.00218°N 71.51064°W		1925	
Central Riverside Park	Wichita, Kansas	37.69741°N 97.34929°W		1926	
Schoellkopf Park	Niagara Falls, New York	43.09471°N 79.04867°W		1926	
Rockwell Park Memorial Boulevard Park	Bristol, Connecticut	41.6726°N 72.961°W 41.66966°N 72.9322°W		1929 1983	Bristol boasts two statues, the 1929 original and a 1983 copy.
Buchanan Park	Lancaster, Pennsylvania	40.04407°N 76.32212°W		1931	This is an example of Newman's other Hiker statue
Belle Isle	Detroit, Michigan	42.3376°N 82.99254°W		1932	
Intersection of Parkard, Washtenaw Avenue and Forest Street	Ypsilanti, Michigan	42.2458°N 83.62728°W		1940	
Oakwood Cemetery	Beloit, Wisconsin	42.507158°N 89.0169°W		1926	

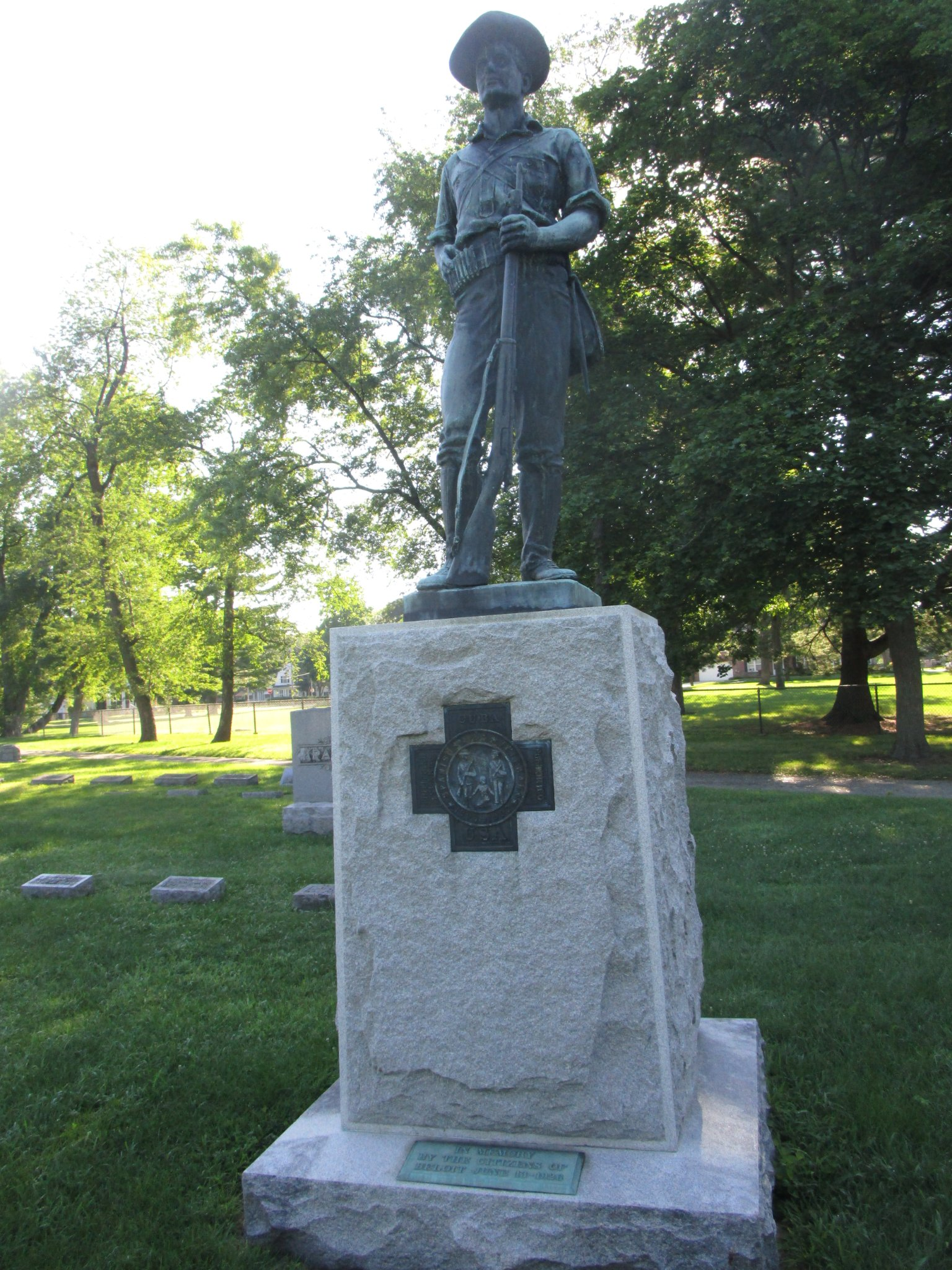
"The Hiker", Spanish-American War memorial

=== Reliefs ===
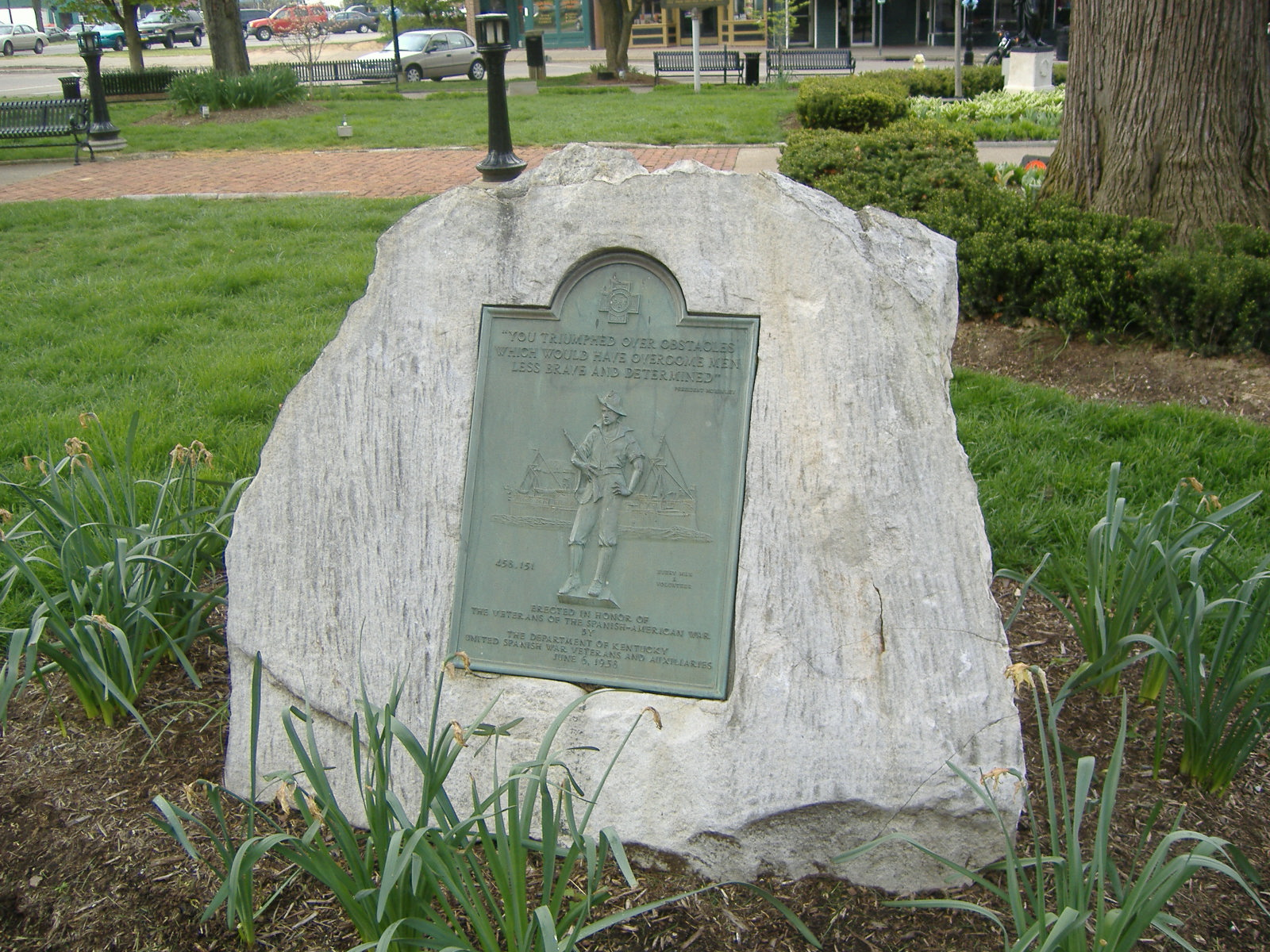
Bronze relief Spanish–American War memorial in Bowling Green, Kentucky

A number of Spanish–American War memorials include a bronze relief showing Newman's Hiker in front of the battleship Maine. Just under the statue's feet is engraved, "Hiker of '98." Included on the relief is President McKinley's quote, "You triumphed over obstacles which would have overcome men less brave and determined."

- Michigan City, Indiana, 1936
- Albany, Georgia, 1937
- Rome, Georgia, 1937
- Battelle Riverfront Park, Columbus, Ohio, 1937
- Bowling Green, Kentucky, 1938
- Gainesville, Georgia, 1938
- Salem, Oregon, 1938
- Atlantic City, New Jersey, 1939
- Stanford, Kentucky, 1939
- Fitzgerald, Georgia, 1940
- Athens, Georgia, 1941
- Paducah, Kentucky, 1941
- Augusta, Georgia, 1942
- Brunswick, Georgia, 1947
- Tampa, Florida, 1949, moved in 2003
- Columbus, Georgia, 1953
- Long Beach, California, 1955

Some of these relief memorials also carry the statement, "Every Man a Volunteer," and may also include the number 458,151. The total number of U.S. service personnel engaged in the war with Spain (proper), the Philippine–American War and the Boxer Rebellion numbered 458,151.

These bronze plaques were made by the Lamb Seal and Stencil Company, which was founded in 1900 by Richard L. Lamb (1871-1960). Lamb was a British immigrant who had fought in the Siege of Santiago in Cuba during the Spanish–American War.
