= Peace Monument (Atlanta) =

Public monument in Atlanta, Georgia, United States

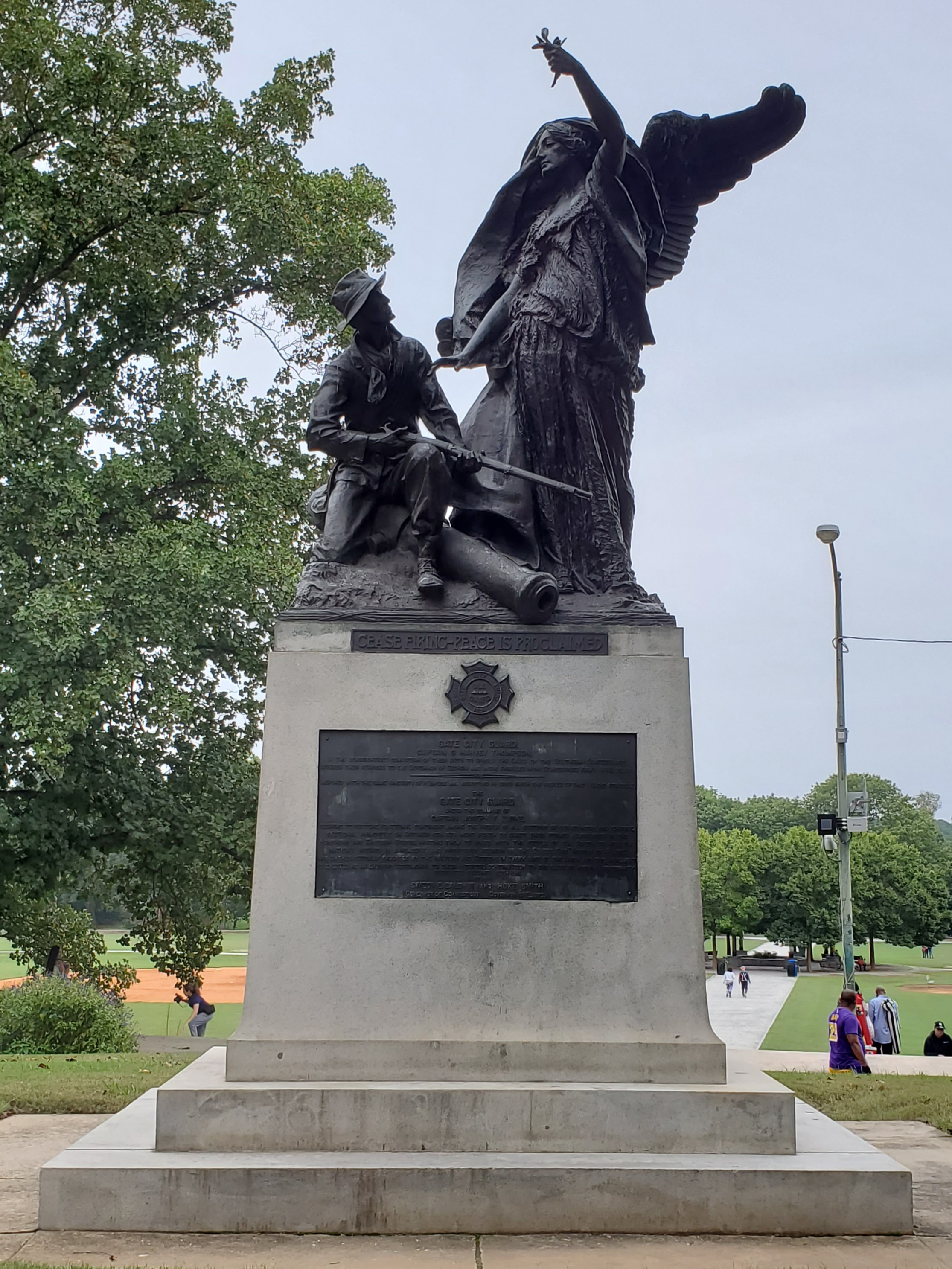
- Peace Monument (2020)
- Location: Piedmont Park, Atlanta, Georgia, United States
- Coordinates: 33°47′11″N 84°22′39″W
- Designer: Allen George Newman
- Dedicated date: October 11, 1911
- Dedicated to: Peace and national unity after the American Civil War; The Lost Cause of the Confederacy

The Peace Monument (also known as The Triumph of Peace) is a public monument in Atlanta, Georgia, United States. Designed by Allen George Newman, the monument is located in Piedmont Park and was erected in 1911 by members of the Old Guard of the Gate City Guard, a Confederate-era militia, as a show of national unity in the years following the American Civil War. The monument has been the subject of controversy recently, with some calling for its removal as a symbol of the Lost Cause of the Confederacy.

== History ==
=== Old Guard and the peace monument ===
In 1857, the Gate City Guard, an Atlanta-based militia, was officially chartered. The group had first been formed in 1854 for the purpose of maintaining law and order in Atlanta, which was nicknamed the "Gate City." During the American Civil War, the militia provided troops for the Confederate States Army, but was disbanded following the end of the war. However, the militia was reconstituted during the Reconstruction era as part of what would later become the Georgia National Guard. Around the same time, the Old Guard Battalion of the Gate City Guard was formed, consisting of former Gate City Guard members who were too old to serve on active duty. This group traveled extensively throughout the United States as part of a mission to improve reconciliation between northern states and southern states following the war.

In 1910, as part of their ongoing efforts to promote reconciliation, the Old Guard decided to erect a monument in Piedmont Park. The following year, the Old Guard commissioned New York City-based sculptor Allen George Newman. The dedication was held on October 11, 1911, attracting over 50,000 visitors. Notable attendees and groups in attendance included the Old Guard State Fencibles, the Ancient and Honorable Artillery Company of Massachusetts, and Mayor of Baltimore James H. Preston. A parade was held down Peachtree Street that ended at the park.

=== Recent controversy ===
On August 13, 2017, following the Unite the Right rally in Charlottesville, Virginia, the monument was defaced. Demonstrators in Atlanta, protesting the white supremacist rally, had organized a march from Woodruff Park to Piedmont Park. Once there some protesters attempted to tear down the monument with a chain, with one protester being hurt by metal falling off the monument. The monument was also graffitied with spray paint by protesters. Following these events, the city of Atlanta created an advisory committee that worked with the Atlanta History Center to discuss possible changes to Confederate monuments and memorials in the city.

In 2019, the Government of Georgia passed a law forbidding the removal of Confederate monuments and memorials in Georgia. In August of that same year, the commission authorized the installation of signs near several Confederate monuments and memorials in the city (including the Peace Monument) that would give more historical context regarding the structures. At the Peace Monument, two signs were placed near the monument, which, according to the CEO of the Atlanta History Center, turn the monument from "an object of veneration into an artifact." The marker mentions the Lost Cause of the Confederacy and its relation to the monument and highlights that the monument neglects the perspective of many African Americans during that time. Additional markers were placed near monuments and memorials in Oakland Cemetery (including the Confederate Obelisk) and Buckhead. Following the placement of these markers, the Atlanta chapter of the NAACP criticized them for not going far enough, with the branch president criticizing the committee for "compromising on racism." An official from the Southern Poverty Law Center similarly criticized the signs, saying, "A plaque standing next to something that massive and already offensive can't really undo the harm to citizens who are being exposed to it." As of 2019, the Gate City Guard continues to hold rededication ceremonies every October.

This monument should no longer stand as a memorial to white brotherhood; rather, it should be seen as an artifact representing a shared history in which millions of Americans were denied civil and human rights.

— Excerpt from the context marker added to the Peace Monument in 2019.

== Design ==
The monument features the "angel of peace" (modeled by Audrey Munson), holding an olive branch, standing over a Confederate soldier who has a gun in his hands, telling the soldier that peace has been proclaimed.

== See also ==
- 1911 in art
- List of Confederate monuments and memorials in Georgia
