= Allen George Newman =

American sculptor (1875–1940)

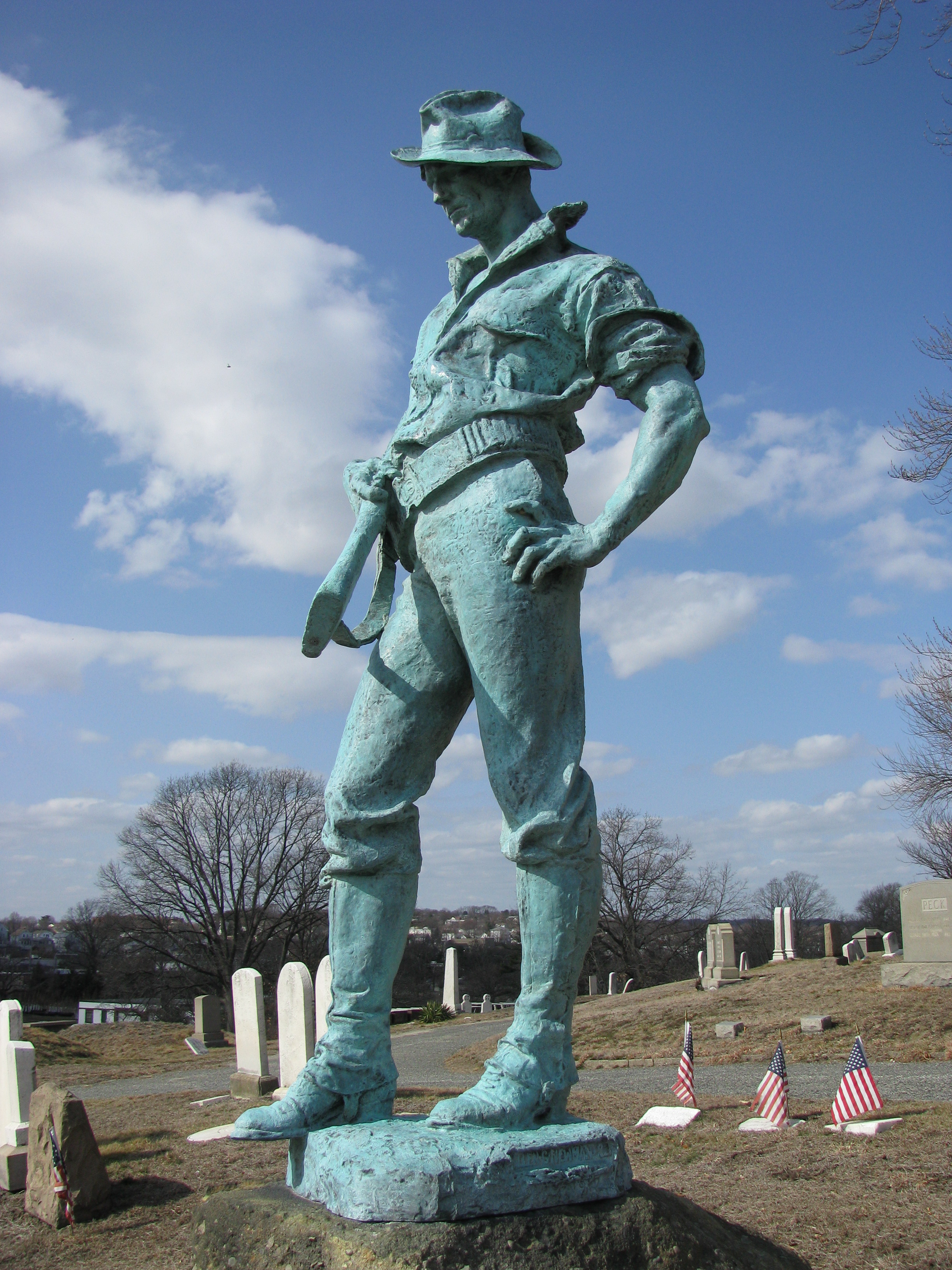
The Hiker (1904, cast 1912), North Burial Ground, Providence, Rhode Island

Allen George Newman III (August 28, 1875 – February 2, 1940) was an American sculptor, best known for his statue "The Hiker".

== Early life ==
He was born in New York City, the son of hardware manufacturer Allen G. Newman, Jr. and his wife Ada E. Hinde. He attended public schools, and the City College of New York, 1890–92. He apprenticed under his brother-in-law, sculptor John Quincy Adams Ward, 1897–1901, then studied at the National Academy of Design.

== Career ==
Newman's early works were relatively modest, busts and relief portraits, or architectural sculpture for buildings at American expositions. He modeled life-size figures of The Pioneer and Greek Water Carrier for J. L. Mott Iron Works of New York City, which were cast in zinc and mass-produced.

=== The Hiker ===
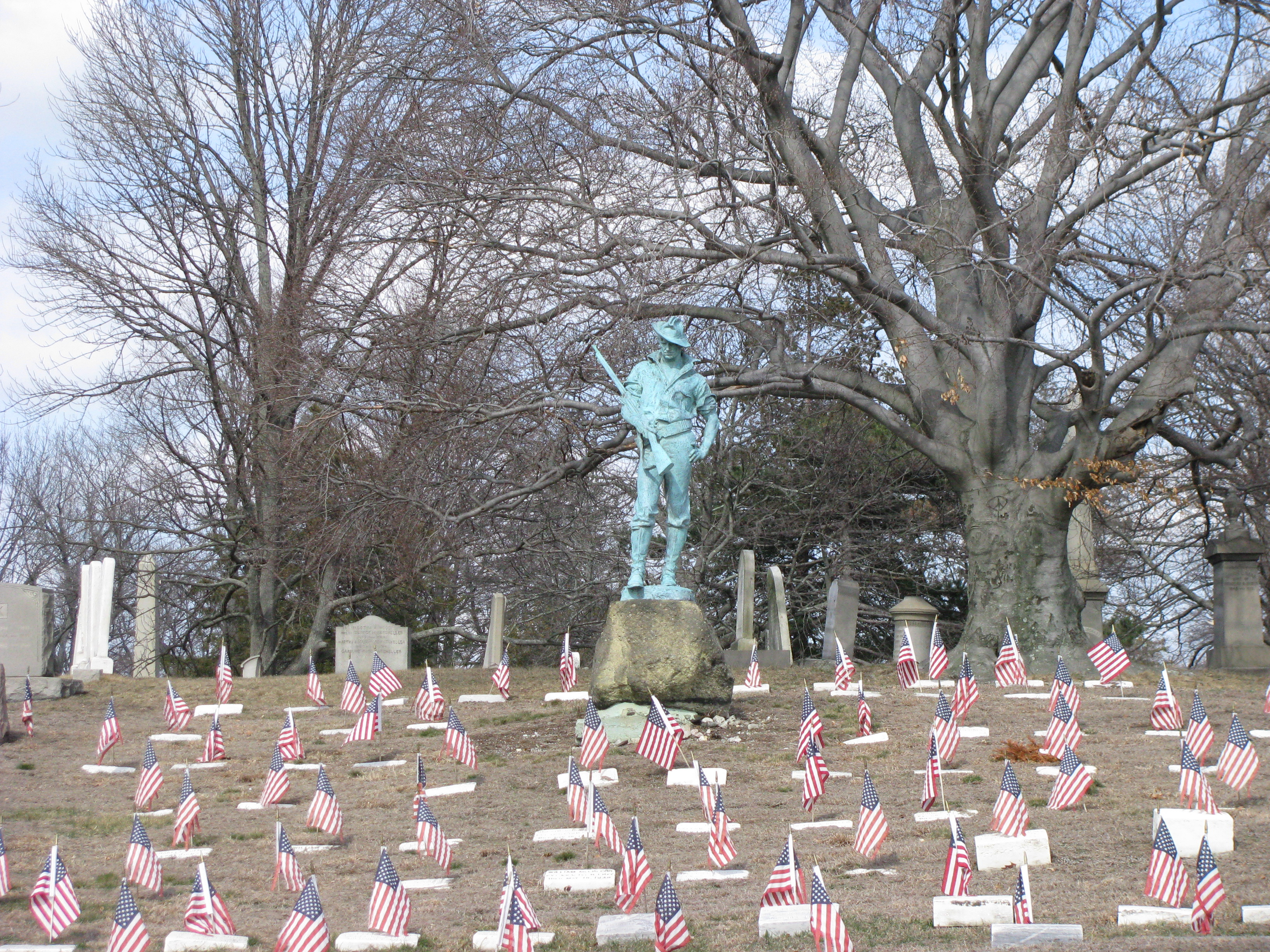
Spanish–American War Section, North Burial Ground, Providence, Rhode Island

Newman had a tremendous early success with The Hiker, a statue of a slouching Spanish–American War soldier, possibly based on an 1899 illustration by Frederic Remington. A heroic size version (in plaster?) was exhibited in the New York State Building at the 1907 Jamestown Exposition. Its first installation as part of a memorial was at the North Burial Ground in Providence, Rhode Island, in a section for Spanish–American War dead. Gen. Charles Wheaton Abbot, Jr. mused on the statue in his speech at its dedication, Memorial Day, May 31, 1912:

The head is strongly poised on a sinewy column. The shoulders are broad, the chest full and deep. The flanks are thin, the hips narrow. The muscular legs show great marching capacity... There is a suggestion at the bow of the knee that he could ride a horse. His trusty Krag is not the first gun he has handled. You will not find that position in the manual, though the muzzle is elevated. It is equally handy to be aimed, clubbed or lunged. His head turns naturally a little to the right to balance the hat brim falling to the left. But the face is smooth shaven as was the mode—every part is strong, every feature clean cut, and all smoothly balanced. The lined cheeks show that in his 28 years he has lived. He is no saint. He is no molly-coddle. He is an American soldier. He is a disciplined man at arms, the wonder of the world today wherever such foregather.

For a time the statue served as the official monument of the United Spanish War Veterans (USWV). Jno. Williams, Inc., a New York foundry, cast bronze versions in several sizes – heroic (9 ft / 2.74 m), life size (7 ft / 2.13 m), and multiple reduced sizes. More than twenty examples adorn war memorials across the United States. Sculptor and critic Lorado Taft called The Hiker "the best bronze soldier in America."

=== Other works ===
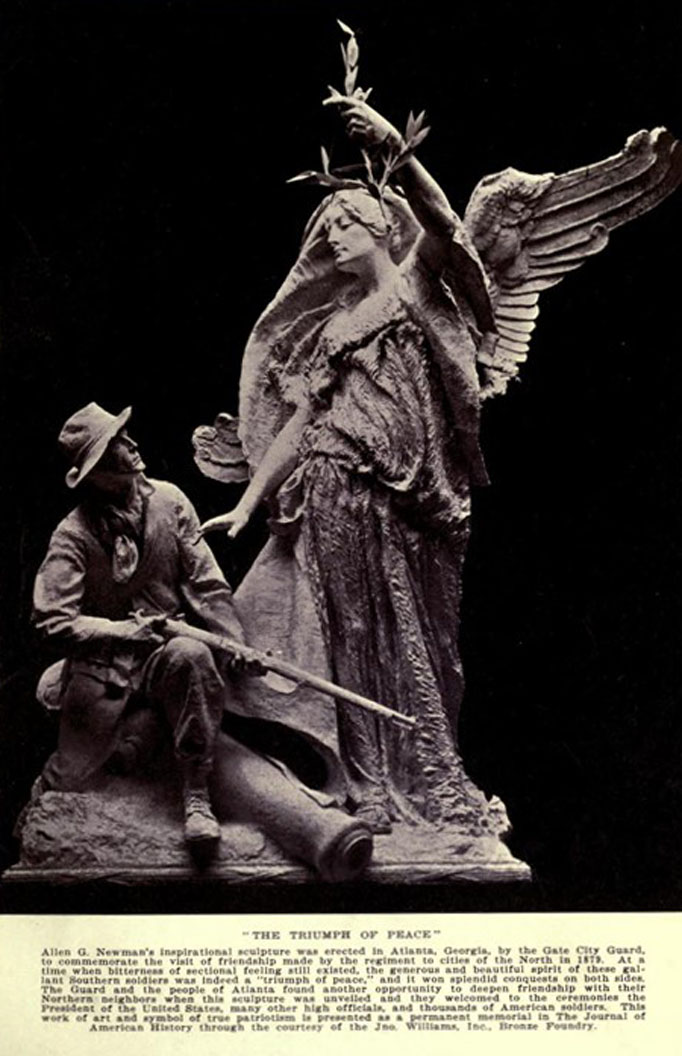
The Triumph of Peace (1911), Atlanta, Georgia

Newman was commissioned by an organization of Atlanta, Georgia, businessmen to create a peace monument for Piedmont Park, commemorating reconciliation between the North and South. The Triumph of Peace depicts a winged goddess holding an olive branch, who declares "Cease Firing – Peace Is Proclaimed," to a Confederate soldier holding a rifle. The gesture of reconciliation was considered significant enough that President William Howard Taft attended the monument's October 10, 1911 dedication. The bronze sculpture was restored in 2016. It was vandalized in August 2017.

The Atlanta peace monument may have led to other Southern commissions. Newman modeled a number of statues and portrait reliefs of Southern politicians and businessmen. He created the sculpture for the Women of the Confederacy Monument in Jacksonville, Florida; and relief portraits of a Confederate officer and a Union officer for monuments in Vicksburg National Military Park.

Newman was commissioned to create a monument in honor of Lt. Col. Herman Koehler, who revolutionized physical education at the United States Military Academy. The bronze tablet, which included a relief portrait, was installed in West Point's Hayes Gymnasium and unveiled on the occasion of the instructor's retirement. Its inscription reads: "To Lieut. Col. Herman J. Koehler, Master of the Sword U.S.M.A. 1885–1923."

Newman created a Rough Rider statue (1931), that was installed on the Spanish–American War Memorial in Lancaster, Pennsylvania. A variation on his own Hiker, the pose of the Rough Rider is slightly different and the soldier holds his rifle with both hands. He created a Sailor statue (1932), that was paired with his Hiker on the Spanish–American War Memorial in Detroit, Michigan.

Four war memorials in Pittsburgh, Pennsylvania, feature Newman's work: The Spanish–American War memorial in Schenley Plaza features a cast of The Hiker. The World War I memorial in the Lawrenceville section features The Doughboy, reminiscent of The Hiker in the soldier's slouching pose. Sacrifice, the World War I memorial in Legion Park, is perhaps Newman's most solemn work. It depicts the soul of a dead soldier passing on his sword as he gazes up to heaven. The World War II memorial in the East Hills section was designed by Newman, but erected after his death. Made of granite, it features an octagonal Art Deco pavilion with fluted piers and a frieze composed of shields and paired American eagle wings.

=== Portal of All the Palaces ===
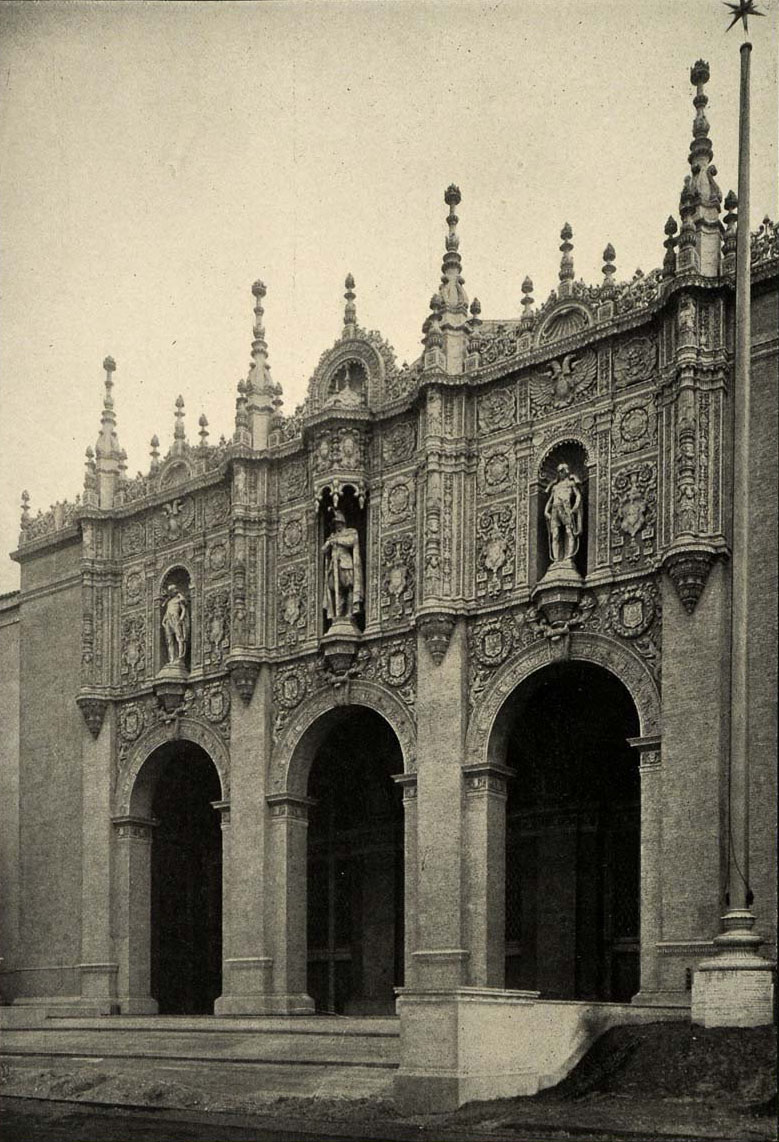
Portal of All the Palaces

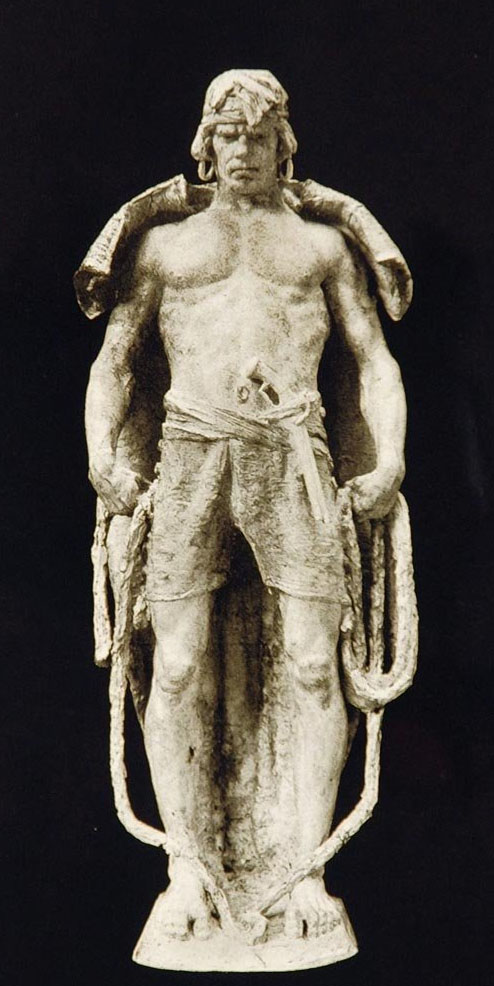
The Pirate

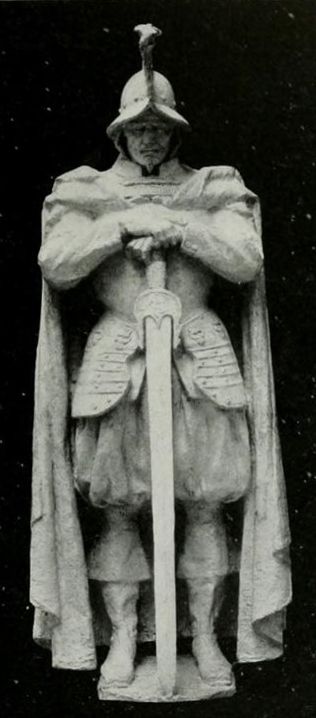
The Conquistador

Architect W. B. Faville was tasked with designing grand entrances for a number of the palaces (exhibition buildings) at the 1915 Panama–Pacific International Exposition in San Francisco, California. His solution was to create a single massive portal that could be assembled out of cast terra cotta sections and mass-produced. Faville's "Portal of All the Palaces" featured a tall 3-arch arcade, with niches over the arches, and a forest of spires rising above its 75-foot (22.9 m) cornice line:

These [portals] were done in the ornate, highly florid Renaissance style known as "plateresque," from the tendency of the Spanish silversmiths to cover every inch of surface with decoration. Rich pilasters on small tasteful corbels divided the spaces above the entrance openings into three bays, each of which contained a niche, the central one canopied. But no saints were in these niches. What you saw were El Capitan, the Conquistador, in the center under the canopy; and on either side of him, each in his lesser niche, a real old low-browed, bow-legged, walk-the-plank pirate, with a most business-like noosed rope in his hands, the bight of which fell in decorative line to his feet. These figures were the work of Allen Newman. They were of commanding stature, being 13 feet [4 m] tall, and from their pedestals 50 feet [15.2 m] in the air they glowered on the sea, where not so long ago their prototypes had made and for a time had held their strong and cruel empire. They were surrounded by a nimbus of the most delicate ornament, which they saved from fatal sweetness and to which they gave a spark of heroic fire.

The portals were also polychromatic, with the dark pink of the unglazed terra cotta accented by glazed pieces in turquoise and burnt orange. Faville's "Portal of All the Palaces" was reproduced for the exposition's north and south gateways, and as the grand entrance to four of the exhibition buildings.

== Honors ==
Newman was elected to the National Sculpture Society in 1907, and voted an associate of the National Academy of Design in 1926. He was a member of the Architectural League of New York and other arts organizations. He was an honorary member of the Spanish War Veterans.

== Personal ==
Newman married Florence Allan on March 28, 1900. They had four children, three of whom, Ramona, Helen and Thomas, lived to adulthood. Newman died on February 2, 1940, in New York City, and was buried at Green-Wood Cemetery in Brooklyn.

== Selected works ==
=== War memorials ===
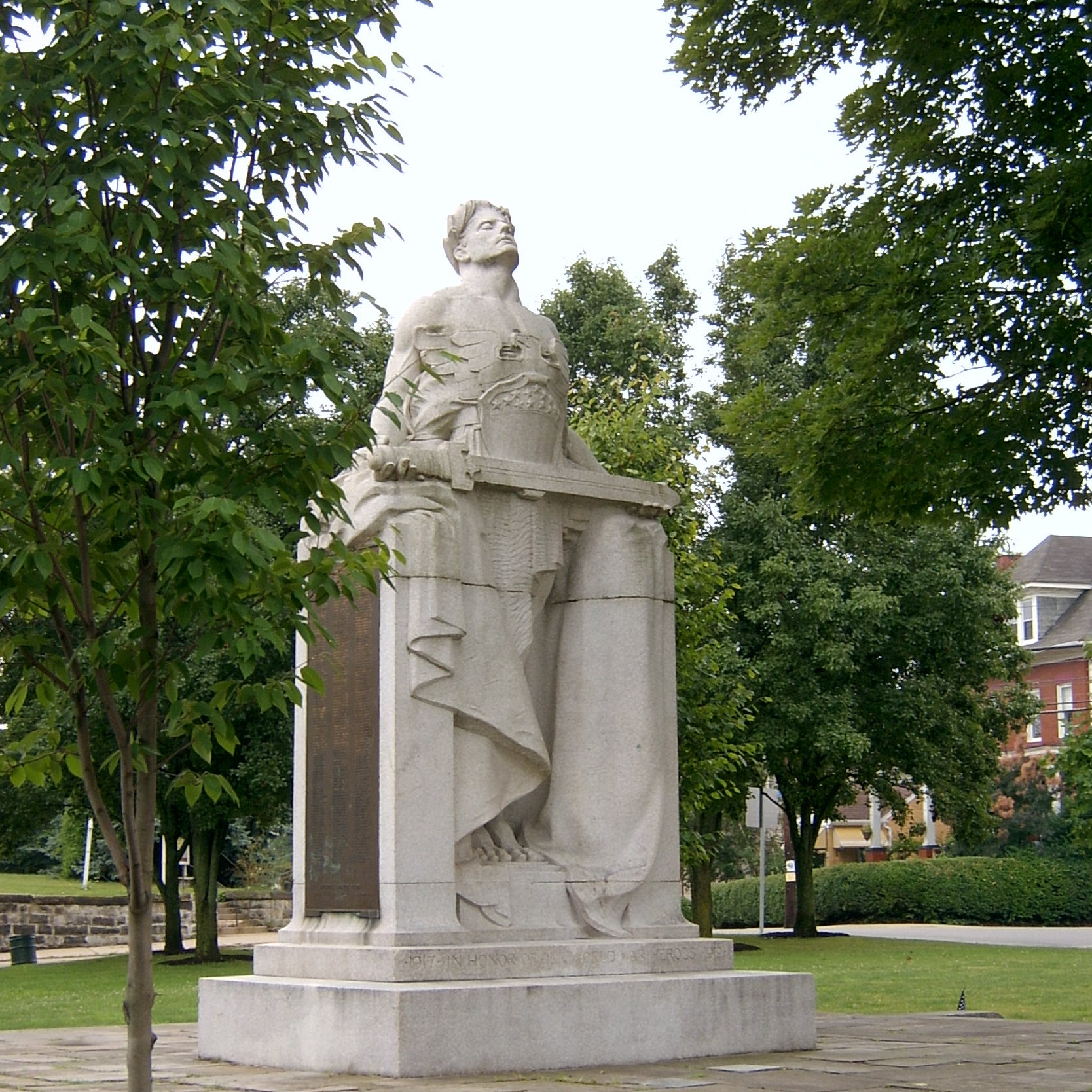
Sacrifice (1922), World War I Memorial, Pittsburgh, Pennsylvania

- The Hiker (bronze, 1912), Spanish–American War Memorial, North Burial Ground, Providence, Rhode Island. First installation of the statue on a memorial. This was followed that same year by war memorials in Staten Island, New York, and Bayonne, New Jersey.
  - See The Hiker (Newman) for a list of other locations.
- Relief portrait: Gen. Philip H. Sheridan (bronze, 1910), Sheridan Monument, Lackawanna County Courthouse, Scranton Pennsylvania. On the monument's reverse side is a relief panel, Sheridan's Ride.
- Women of the Confederacy Monument (bronze, 1914–15), Confederate Park, Jacksonville, Florida
- Relief portrait: Col. Francis M. Cockrell (bronze, 1915), Cockrell Monument, Vicksburg National Military Park, Vicksburg, Mississippi
- Relief portrait: Col. Thomas J. Lucas (bronze, 1916), Lucas Monument, Vicksburg National Military Park, Vicksburg, Mississippi
- The Doughboy (bronze, 1921), World War I Memorial, Doughboy Square, Lawrenceville, Pittsburgh, Pennsylvania
  - Later casts in Rhinebeck, New York, and Cliffside Park, New Jersey.
- Sacrifice (granite, 1922), World War I Memorial, Legion Park, Pittsburgh, Pennsylvania
- The Rough Rider (bronze, 1931), Spanish–American War Memorial, Buchanan Park, Lancaster, Pennsylvania.
- Spanish–American War Memorial (bronze, 1932), Belle Isle Park, Detroit, Michigan. It features a cast of Newman's Hiker (1904) and his Sailor (1932).
- World War II Memorial (granite, 1948), Frankstown Avenue & Bennett Street, East Hills, Pittsburgh, Pennsylvania, J. C. McCabe, fabricator.

=== Statues ===
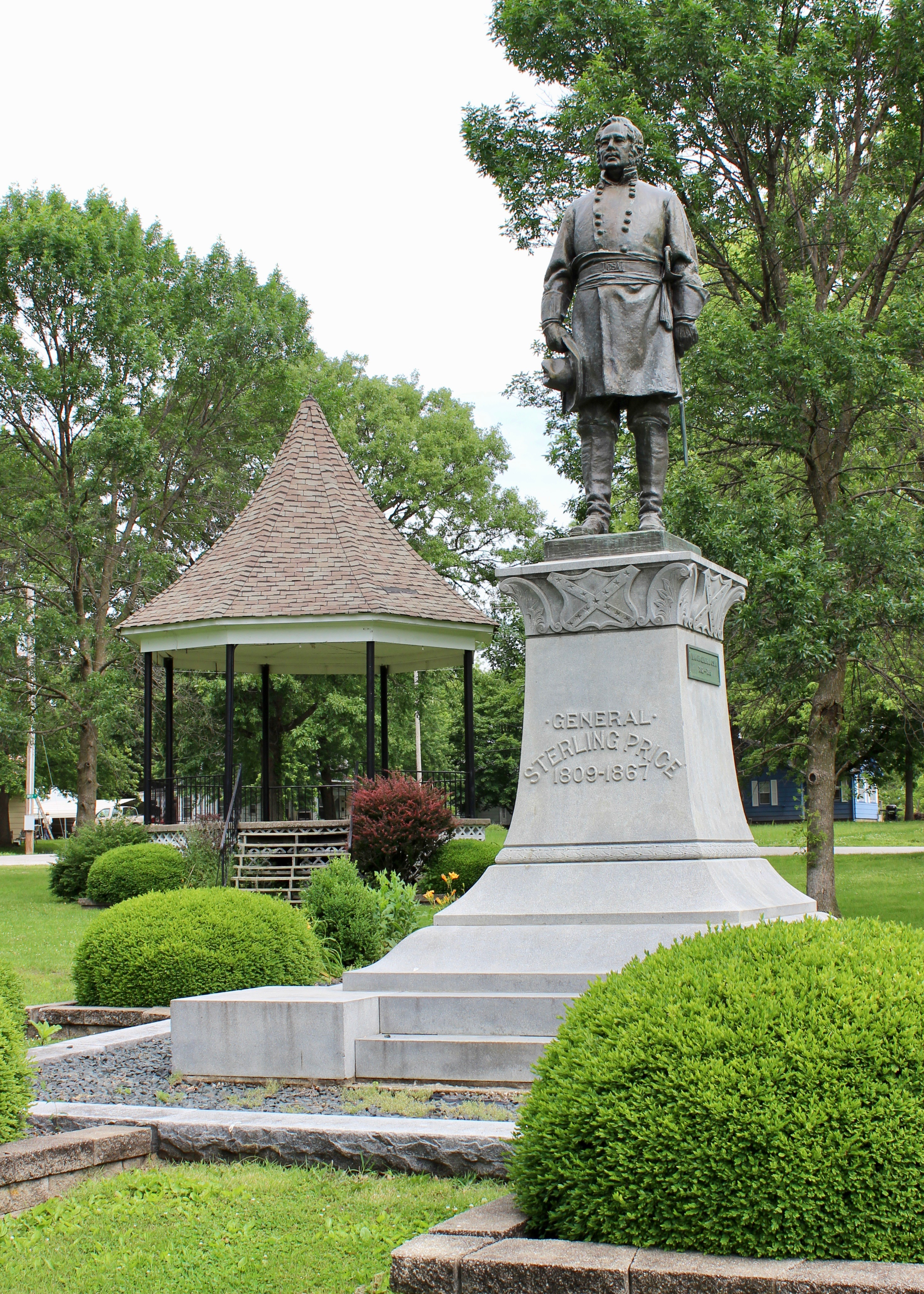
General Sterling Price (1915), Price Park, Keytesville, Missouri

- The Owl, Scarritt Memorial Drinking Fountain (bronze, 1903), DePaul University, Chicago, Illinois
- The Hiker (1904), Munson-Williams-Proctor Arts Institute, Utica, New York The first bronze cast from Newman's 28-in (71 cm) plaster maquette.
  - The Hiker (plaster?, c.1907), New York State Building, 1907 Jamestown Exposition, Jamestown, Virginia. Heroic size, 9 ft (2.74 m)
- Greek Water Carrier (zinc, 1905), J. L. Mott Iron Works, New York City. A cast of Greek Water Carrier stands in Johnson City, Tennessee.
- The Pioneer (zinc, c.1905), J. L. Mott Iron Works, New York City. A 1910 cast of The Pioneer stands atop the Carter Memorial Fountain in Ashland, Oregon.
- Music of the Waters Fountain (marble, 1910), Riverside Drive at 156th Street, Manhattan, New York City Audrey Munson posed for the mermaid figure.
- The Triumph of Peace (bronze, 1911), Piedmont Park, Atlanta, Georgia.
- William C. Oates (bronze, c.1911), Oates Grave Monument, Oakwood Cemetery, Montgomery, Alabama. The life-size statue stands before an obelisk.
- Israel A. Marks (bronze, 1913), Highland Park, Meridian, Mississippi
- Life-size crucifix (bronze, c.1913), Saint John the Baptist Greek Orthodox Church, Perth Amboy, New Jersey
- General Sterling Price (bronze, 1915), Price Park, Keytesville, Missouri
- Thomas Johnston Grier (bronze, c.1920), Christ Episcopal Church, Lead, South Dakota
- Daniel S. Dickinson (bronze, 1924), Broome County Courthouse, Binghamton, New York

=== Architectural sculpture ===
- Pedimental relief: Liberty and Justice—Seal of the State of New York (medium, 1904), New York State Building, 1904 World's Fair, Saint Louis, Missouri
- Relief panels: Historical Scenes of Early American History (medium, 1905), New York State Building, Lewis and Clark Centennial Exposition, Portland, Oregon
- Day and Night (marble, c.1915), Harriman National Bank Building, SE corner 5th Avenue & 44th Street, Manhattan, New York City
- Niche figures, Portal of All the Palaces, Panama–Pacific International Exposition, San Francisco, California, William Baker Faville, architect.
  - The Conquistador (terra cotta, 1915)
  - The Pirate (terra cotta, 1915).
    - A reduced size version of The Pirate was exhibited at the National Sculpture Society, 1916, and the Pennsylvania Academy of the Fine Arts, 1916.
    - A 36-inch bronze version, titled Pieces of Eight, is in the collection of the National Arts Club.
- History of Medicine Frieze (marble, 1937), Lobby, Jersey City Medical Center, Jersey City, New Jersey

=== Busts, bas reliefs & medals ===
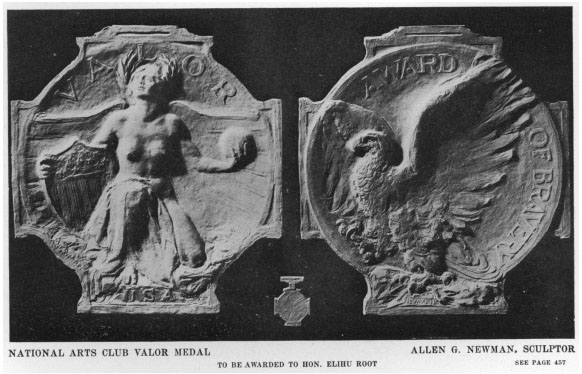
National Arts Club Valor Medal (1917)

- Relief portrait: Thomas C. Wrigley (bronze, c.1905), Wrigley Memorial, Wrigley Park, Paterson, New Jersey
- Relief portrait: Joel Chandler Harris (bronze, c.1908), Harris Grave Monument, Westview Cemetery, Atlanta, Georgia
- Relief panels, Henry Hudson Memorial Shaft (bronze, 1909–10), Riverside Park, Riverside Drive at 72nd Street, Manhattan, New York City. An ornate streetlight erected by The Colonial Dames of America.
- Bust: Maj. Gen. Edgar A. Russell (bronze, c.1910), U.S. Military Academy, West Point, New York
- Relief portrait: Robert E. Lee (bronze, 1912), cast by Jno. Williams Inc., New York.
- Relief portrait: Jonathan Dwight Memorial Tablet (bronze, c.1912), Church of the Unity, Springfield, Massachusetts. The church was demolished in 1961.
- Edward Ames Temple Memorial Tablet (1913), Historical Department Building, Iowa State University, Ames, Iowa. Features 6 relief portraits of Iowa pioneers.
- Joan of Arc Medal (bronze, 1915). Features a nude St. Joan grasping her shield. Exhibited at the Pennsylvania Academy of the Fine Arts, 1916.
- Relief portrait: Lewis Cass (bronze, 1915), Cass Memorial, Mackinac Island State Park, Mackinac Island, Michigan
- National Arts Club Valor Medal (bronze, 1917), National Arts Club of New York. Newman's medal design was chosen from the submissions of about 100 sculptors.
- Bust: Cardinal William H. O'Connell, Cardinal O'Connell Memorial Fountain (bronze, 1918), Cardinal O'Connell Parkway, Lowell, Massachusetts
- Relief portrait, Theodore Roosevelt Memorial Plaque (bronze, 1919), cast by John Polachek, Long Island City.
- Relief portrait, Ferdinand Foch Memorial Plaque (bronze, 1919), cast by John Polachek, Long Island City.
- Relief portrait, Woodrow Wilson Memorial Plaque (bronze, c.1919), cast by John Polachek, Long Island City. An example is at Woodrow Wilson Presidential Library, Saunton, Virginia.
- Relief portrait: Lt. Col. Herman Koehler (bronze, 1923), Koehler Tablet, Hayes Gymnasium, U.S. Military Academy, West Point, New York.
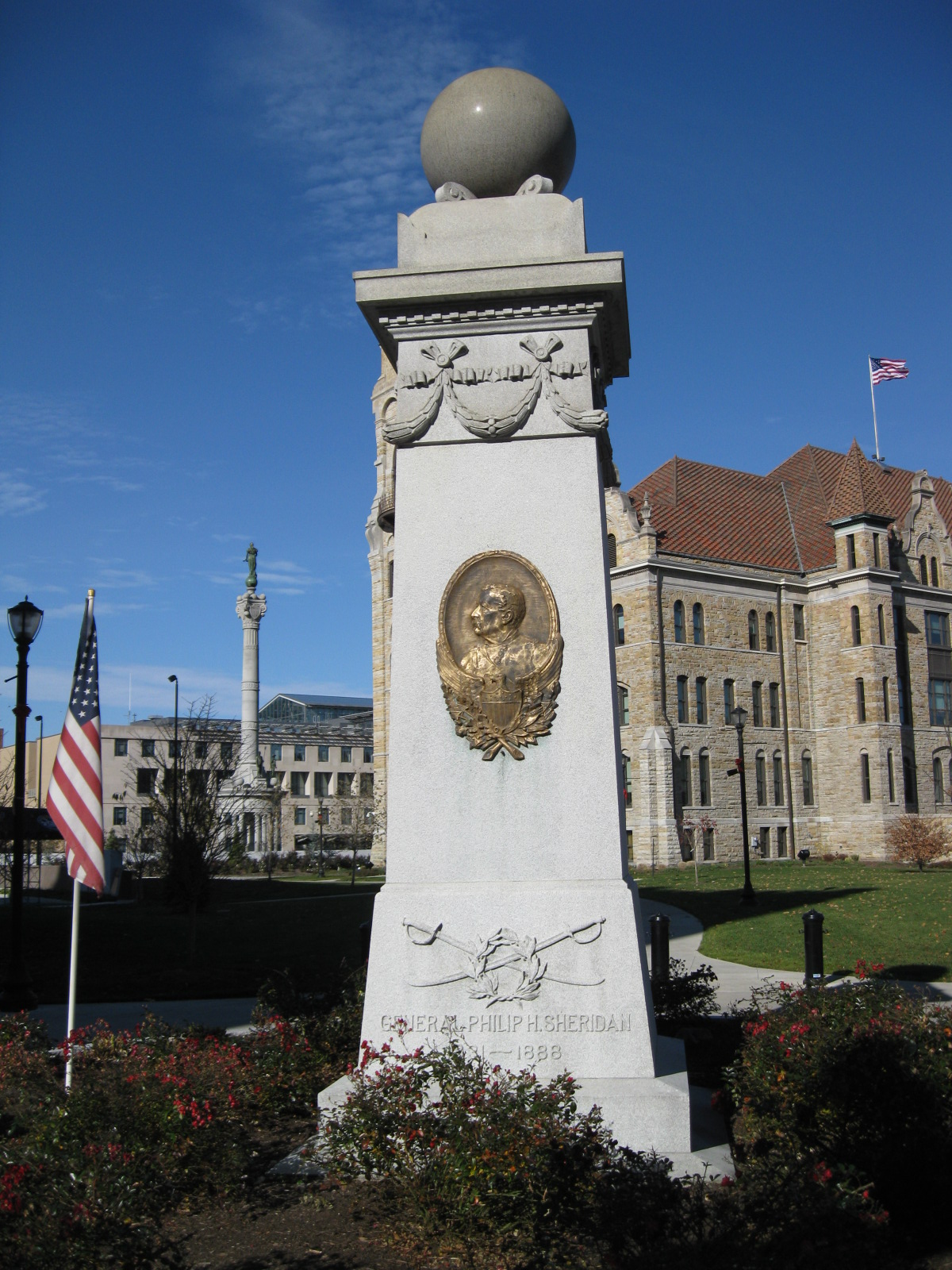
Sheridan Monument (1910), Scranton, Pennsylvania

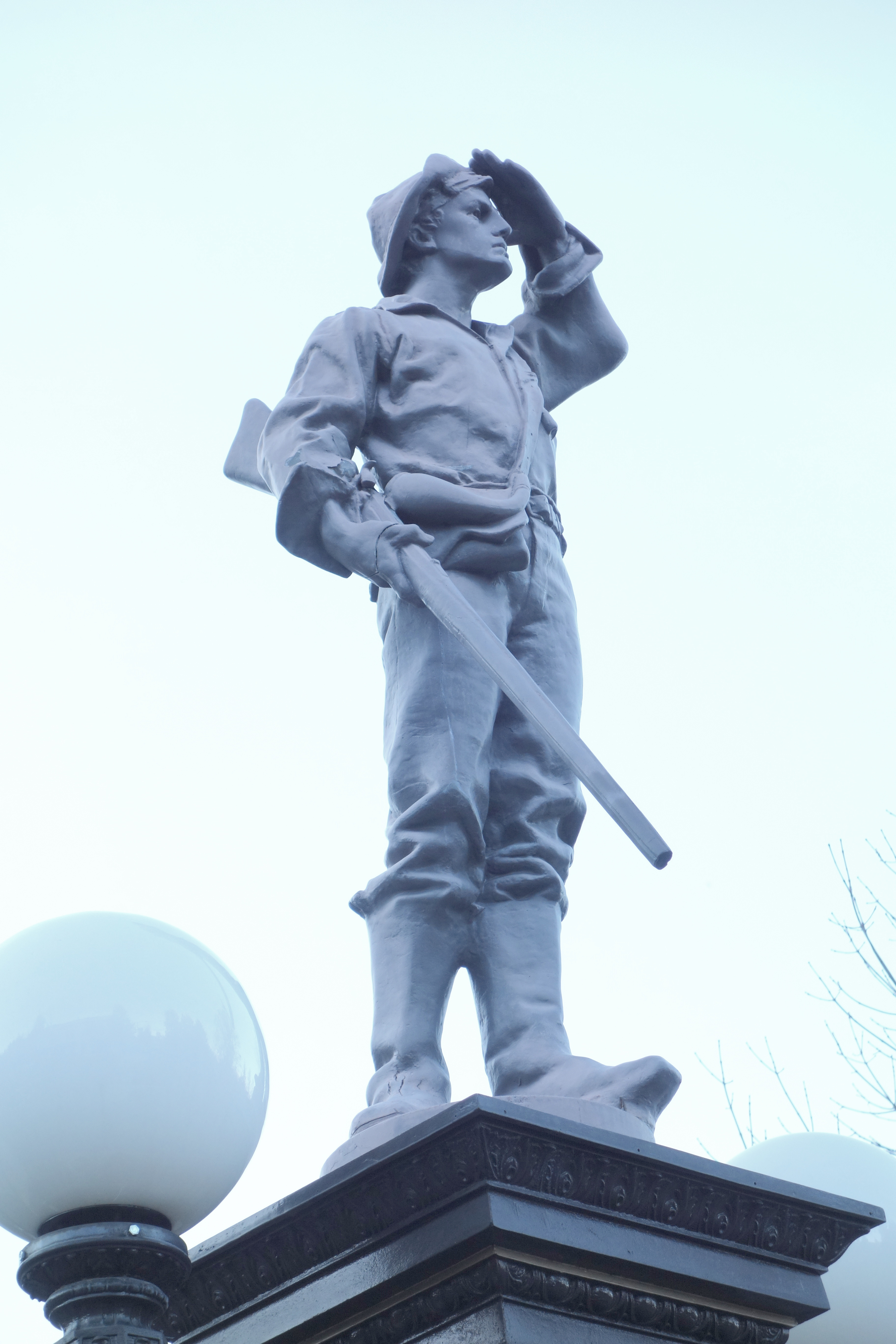
The Pioneer (c.1910), Ashland, Oregon

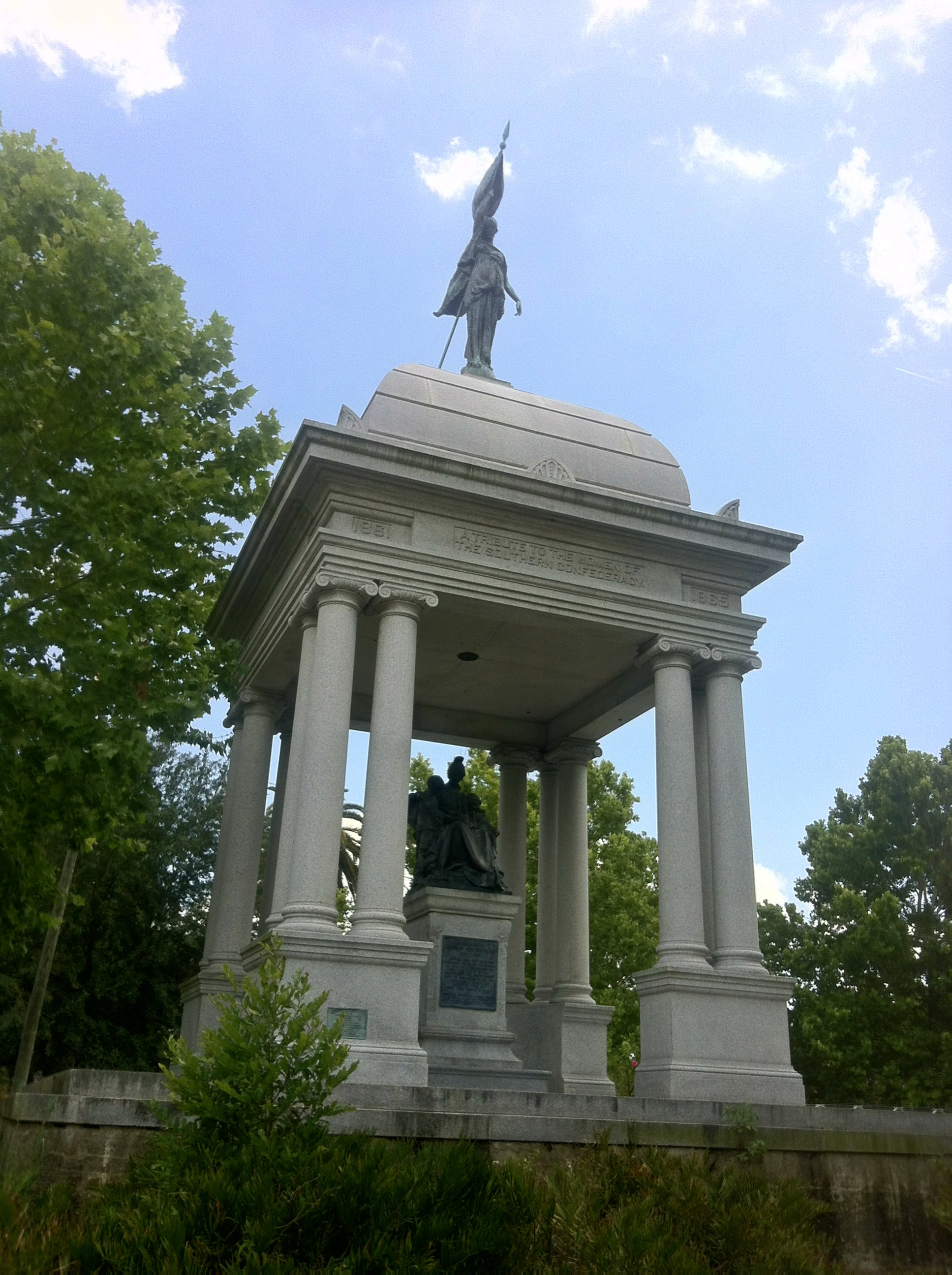
Women of the Confederacy Monument (1914–15), Jacksonville, Florida

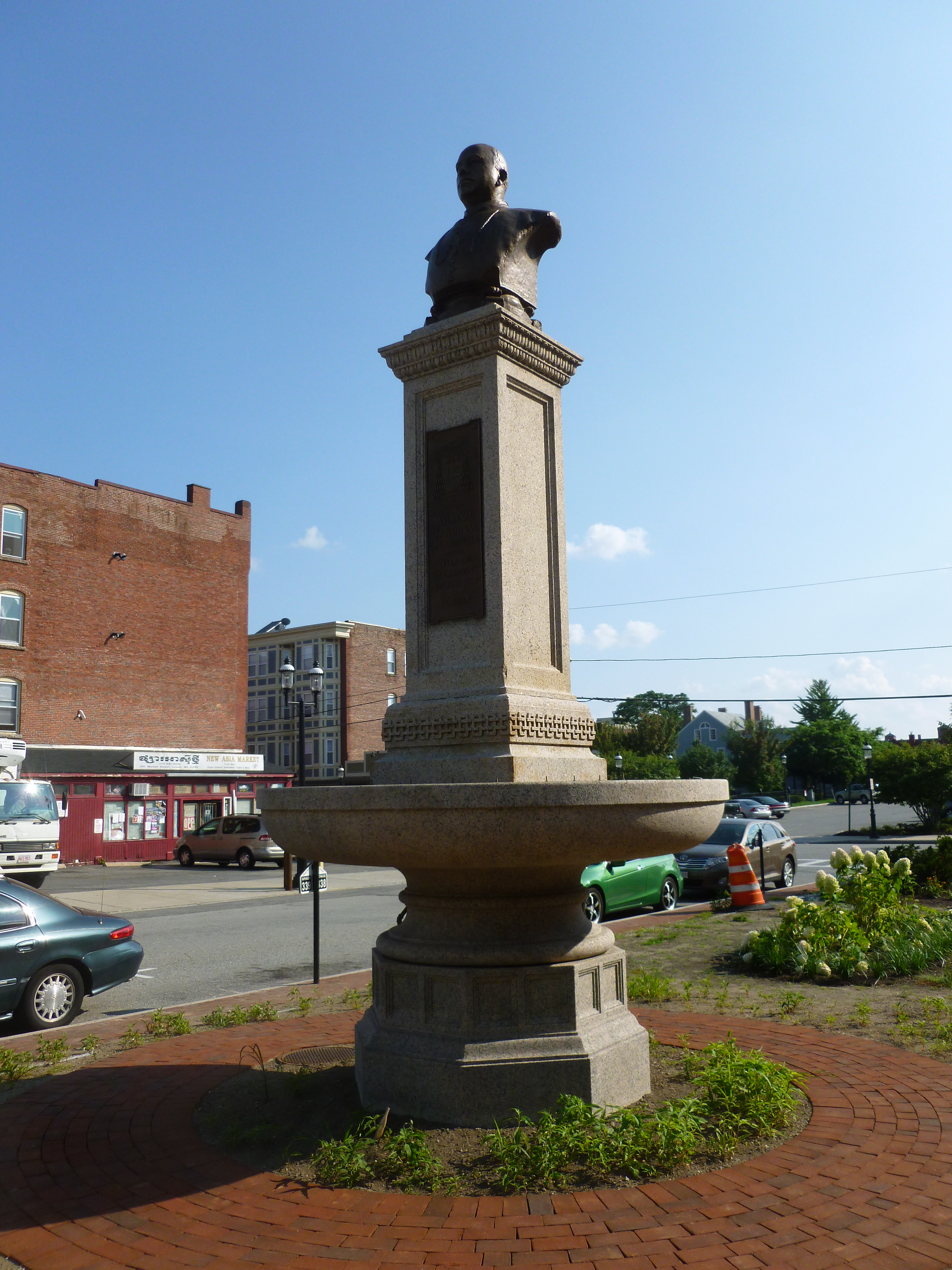
Cardinal O'Connell Memorial Fountain (1918), Lowell, Massachusetts

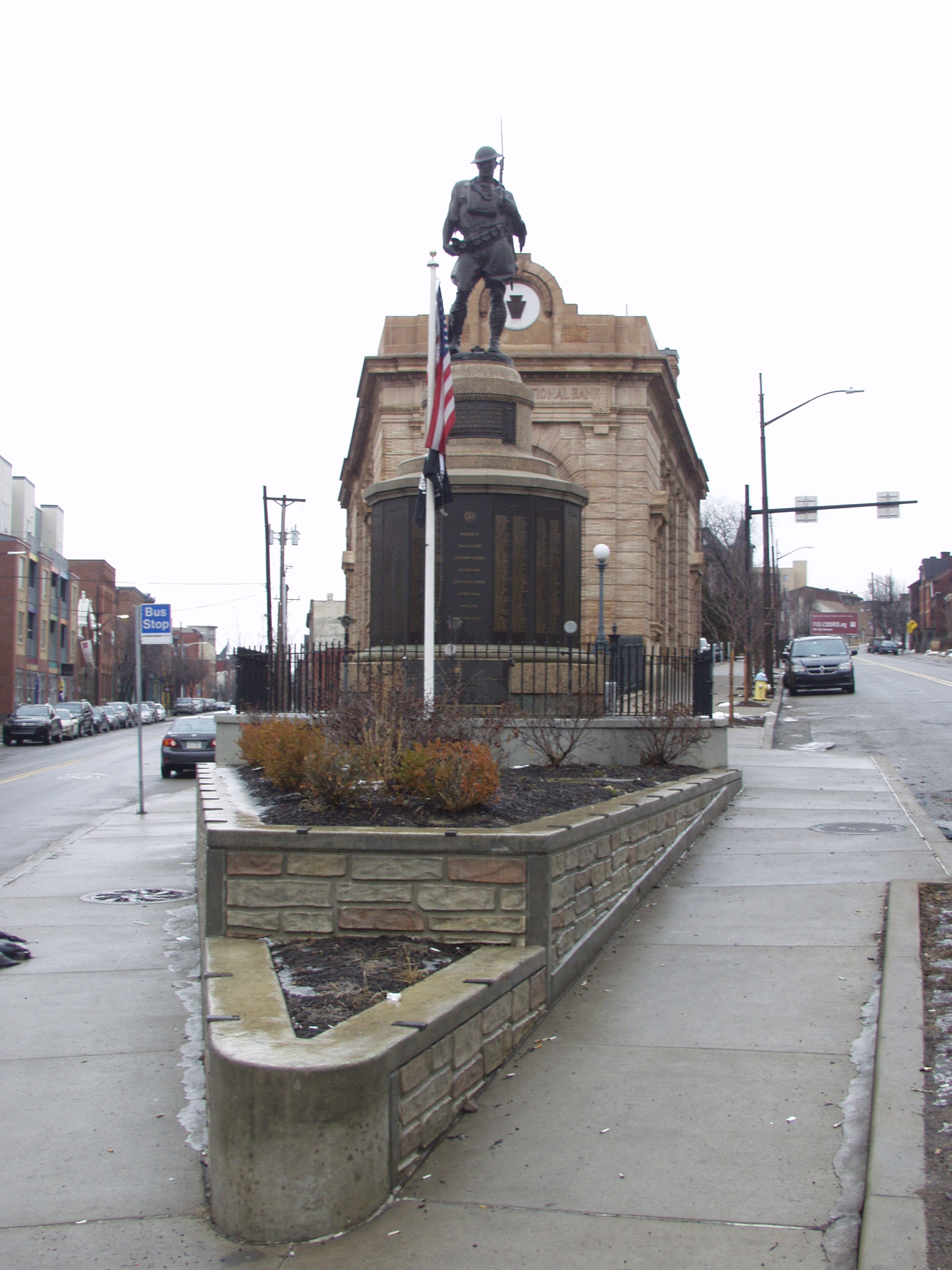
The Doughboy (1921), Pittsburgh, Pennsylvania

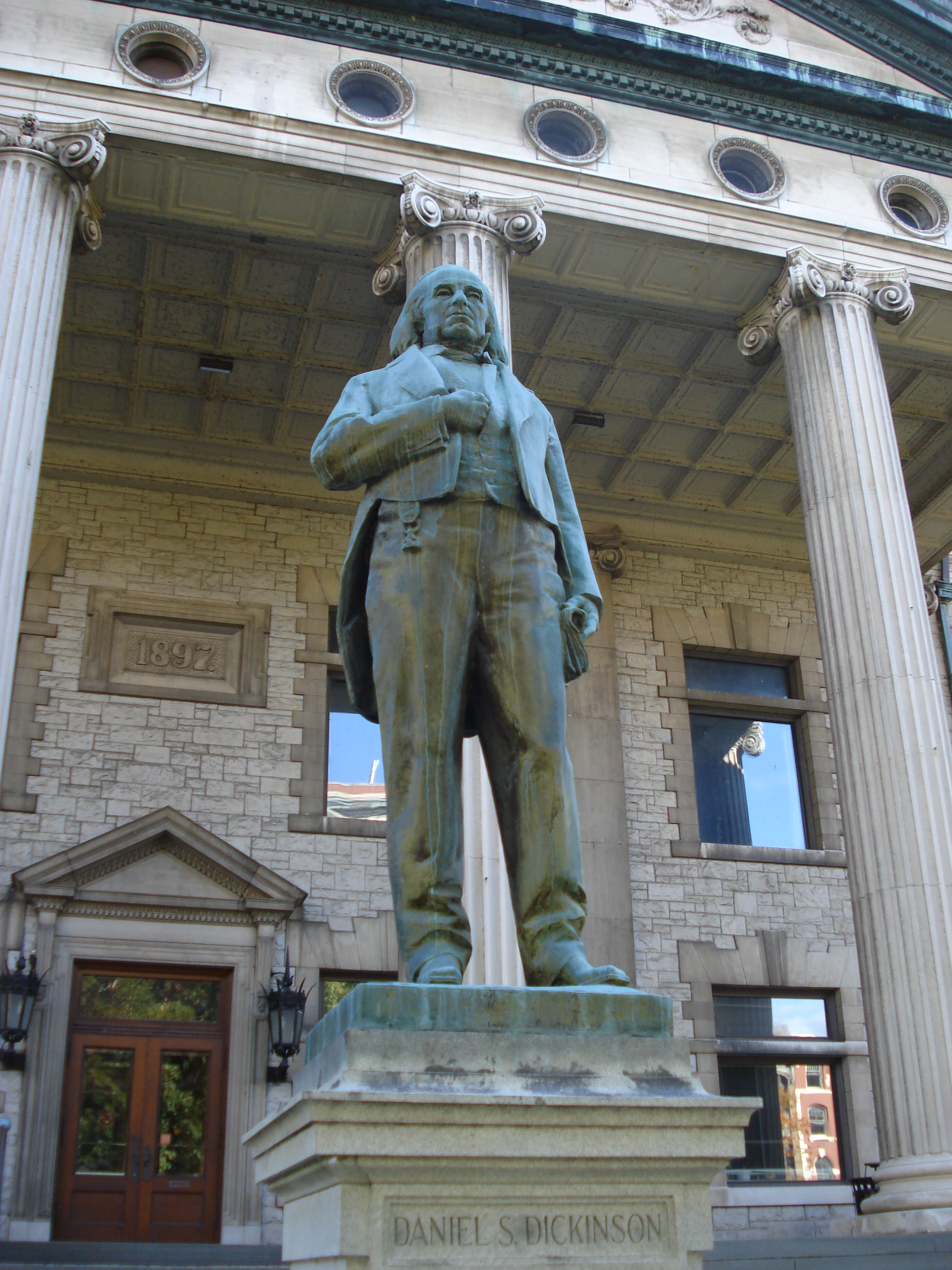
Daniel S. Dickinson (1924), Binghamton, New York

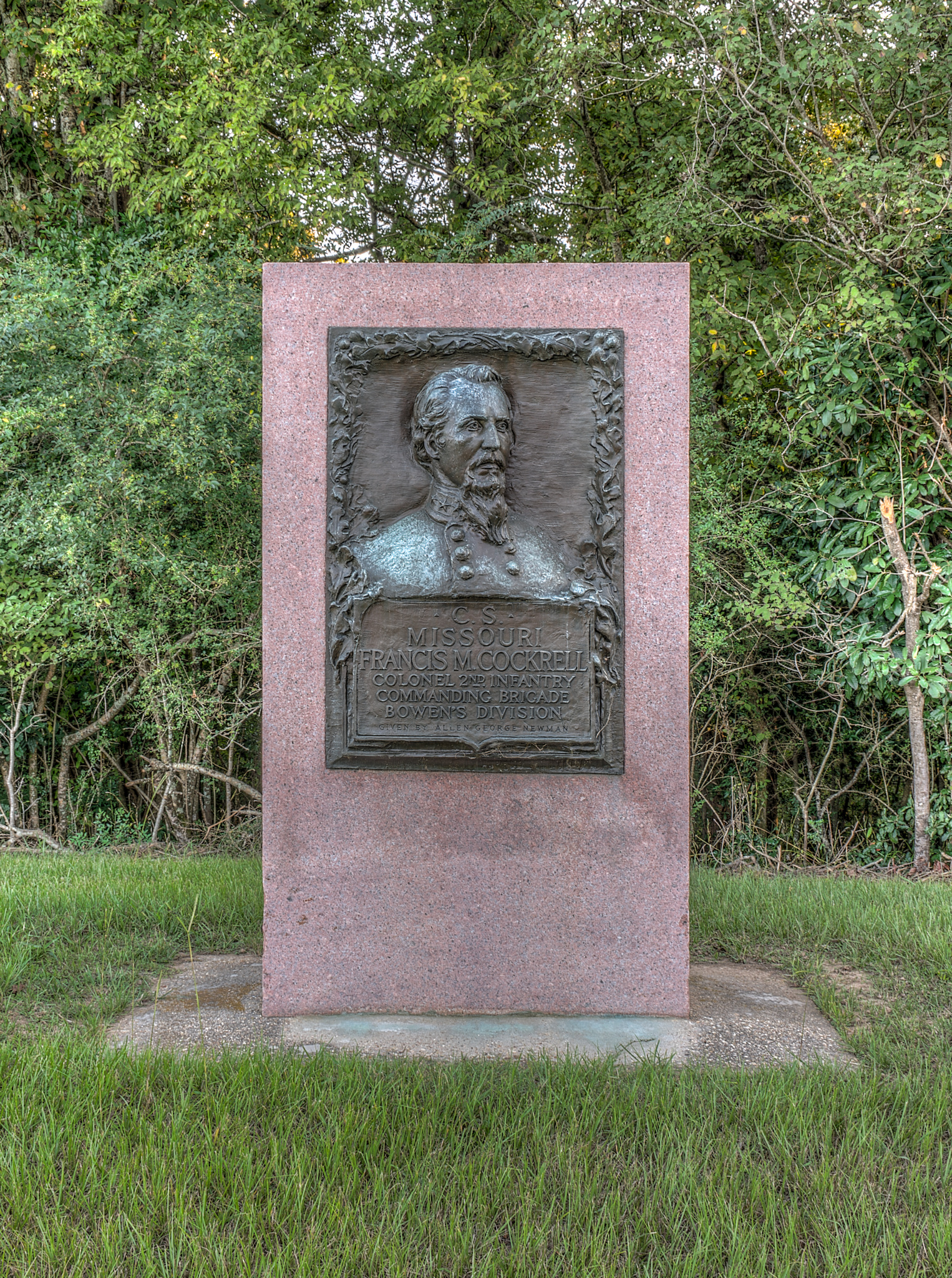
Col. Francis Cockrell (1915) at Vicksburg National Military Park
