= Confederate Obelisk =

Monument in Atlanta, Georgia, US

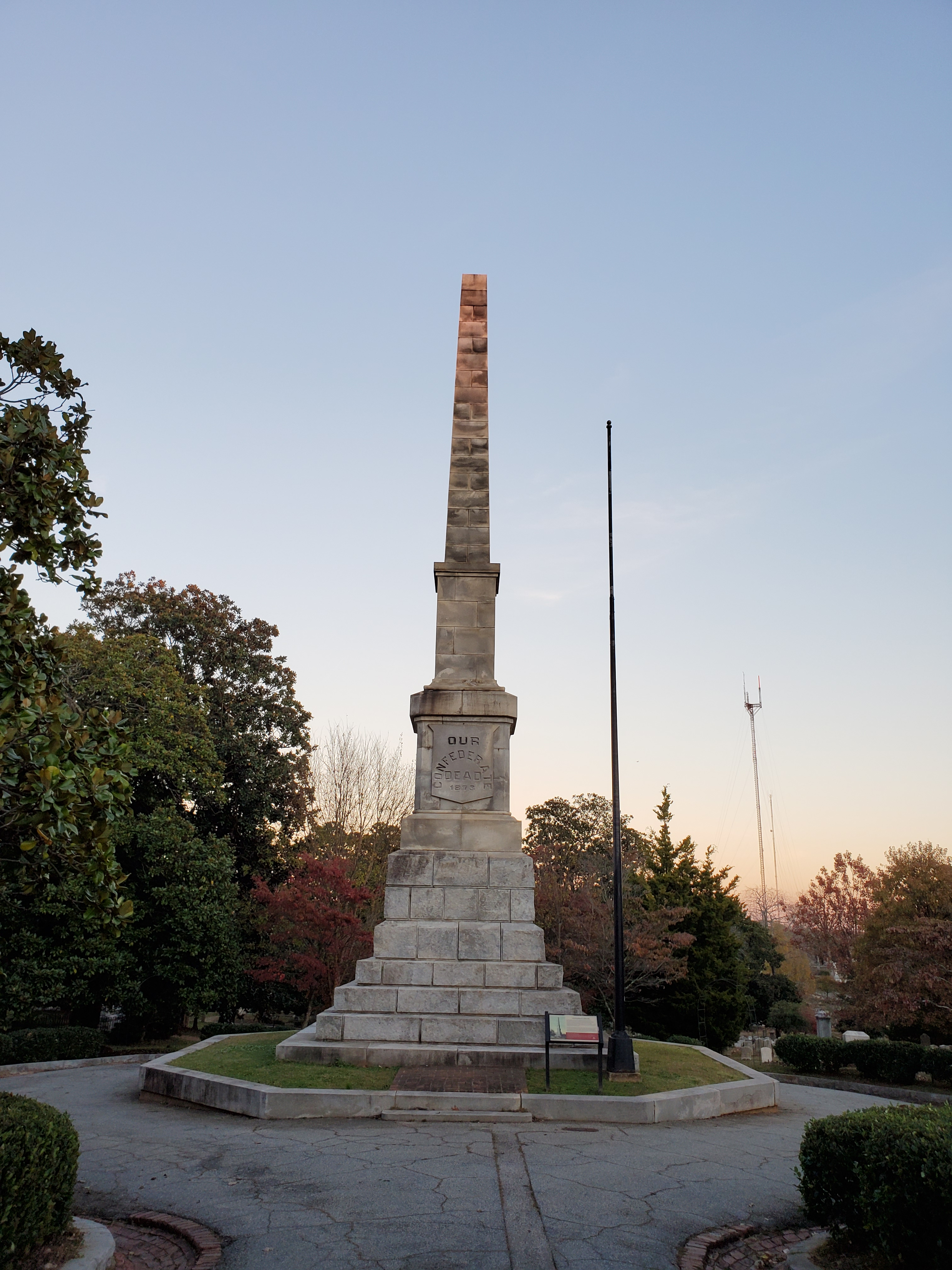
- Confederate Obelisk (2020)
- Interactive map of Confederate Obelisk
- Location: Oakland Cemetery, Atlanta, Georgia, United States
- Coordinates: 33°44′53″N 84°22′19″W
- Type: Obelisk
- Material: Granite
- Height: 65 feet (20 m)
- Beginning date: October 15, 1870
- Dedicated date: April 26, 1874
- Dedicated to: Confederate war dead
- Confederate Obelisk
- U.S. Historic district – Contributing property
- Part of: Oakland Cemetery (Atlanta) (ID76000627)
- Added to NRHP: April 28, 1976

The Confederate Obelisk is a large Confederate monument located in the Oakland Cemetery of Atlanta, Georgia, United States. The structure, a tall obelisk located in the cemetery's Confederate section, was dedicated in 1874. Due to its connection to the Confederate States of America, the monument has been vandalized repeatedly.

== History ==
=== Background and dedication ===
Oakland Cemetery in Atlanta is one of the largest and oldest cemeteries in the city. Over 6,900 Confederate soldiers are buried in the cemetery, many of whom had died during the Atlanta campaign of the American Civil War. The monument's obelisk was commissioned by the Atlanta Ladies' Memorial Association (ALMA), who later commissioned another Confederate monument in the cemetery, the Lion of the Confederacy sculpture. The cornerstone for the monument was laid on October 15, 1870, on the day of Robert E. Lee's funeral, with John Brown Gordon, a Confederate general and later Governor of Georgia, serving as a speaker at the event. In the cornerstone, the ALMA placed an image of Lee, an 1862 Confederate flag, Confederate money and stamps, a bullet, two gloves, and a roster of the ALMA. The monument cost $8,000 to build, with granite donated by the Stone Mountain Granite Company and marble tablets designed and donated by a local marble merchant.

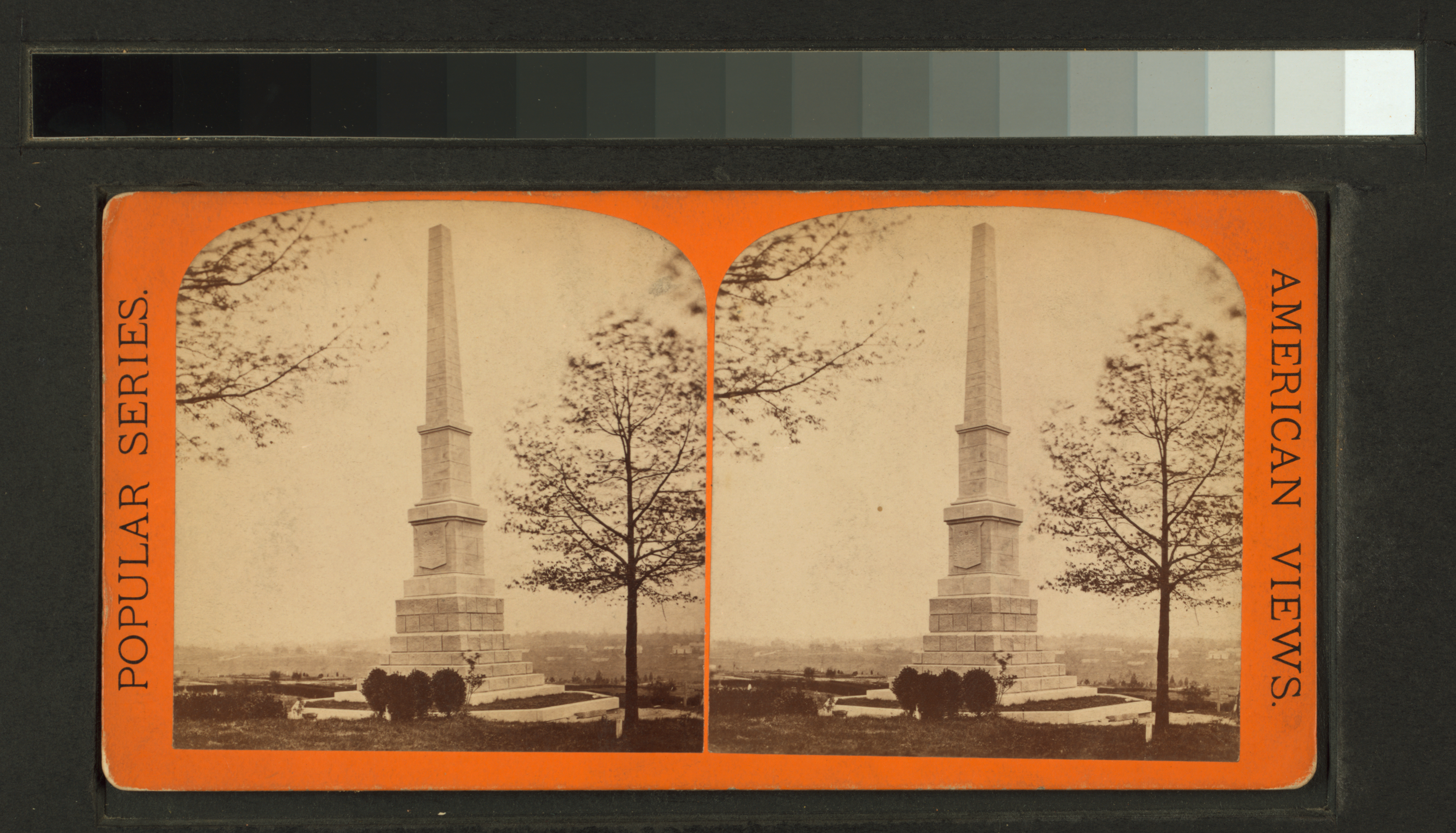
Stereoscopic image of the obelisk (1880)

The monument was dedicated on April 26, 1874, on Confederate Memorial Day. Librarian and archivist Ruth Blair, speaking in 1939, called the structure Atlanta's first monument. At the time of its dedication, the 65-foot (20 m) tall obelisk stood as the tallest structure in the city, a record it would hold for several years. The ceremony, which started at noon, featured several former Confederate officials as speakers and Confederate veterans as attendees, included a parade and other festivities. The monument would in later years come to be a focal point for annual Confederate Memorial Day celebrations. It currently remains the tallest structure in the cemetery.

=== Recent controversy ===
In 2017, following the Unite the Right rally, Atlanta Mayor Kasim Reed organized a committee to assess the Confederate monuments in the city and provide feedback on possible actions to be taken. Georgia state law prohibits the removal of such monuments and so the city government began to work with the Atlanta History Center to create "contextual markers" that would add historical context to the monuments. The Confederate Obelisk was one of several monuments chosen to have markers added to them, which also included the Lion sculpture and the Peace Monument in Piedmont Park. Speaking about the markers, one of the executive directors for the Historic Oakland Foundation said, "We want to say these things have different meanings. Depending on the era and time, it can mean different things to different people." These markers were added to the obelisk in August 2019. Following the installation of these markers, the NAACP criticized them, with the president of the Atlanta branch calling them "a profound disappointment" and that they "don't counter the notion of white supremacy."

During the George Floyd protests in Georgia, the obelisk and Lion were vandalized on the night of May 28, 2020. The monuments were subsequently vandalized on several separate occasions throughout May and June 2020.

== Design ==
The monument is a large granite obelisk that features marble tablets affixed near the base. An inscription on the obelisk reads "OUR CONFEDERATE DEAD".

== See also ==
- 1874 in art
- List of Confederate monuments and memorials in Georgia
