= Jno. Williams, Inc. =

American foundry

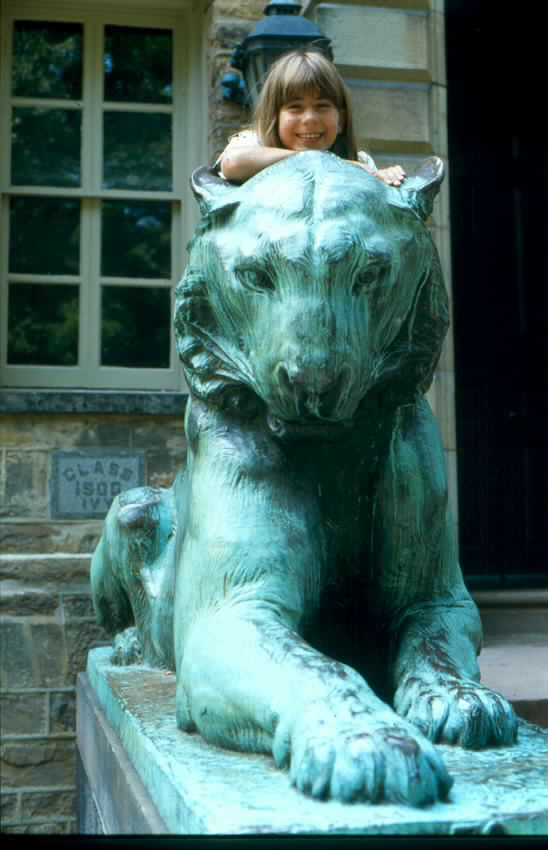
Princeton University Tigers

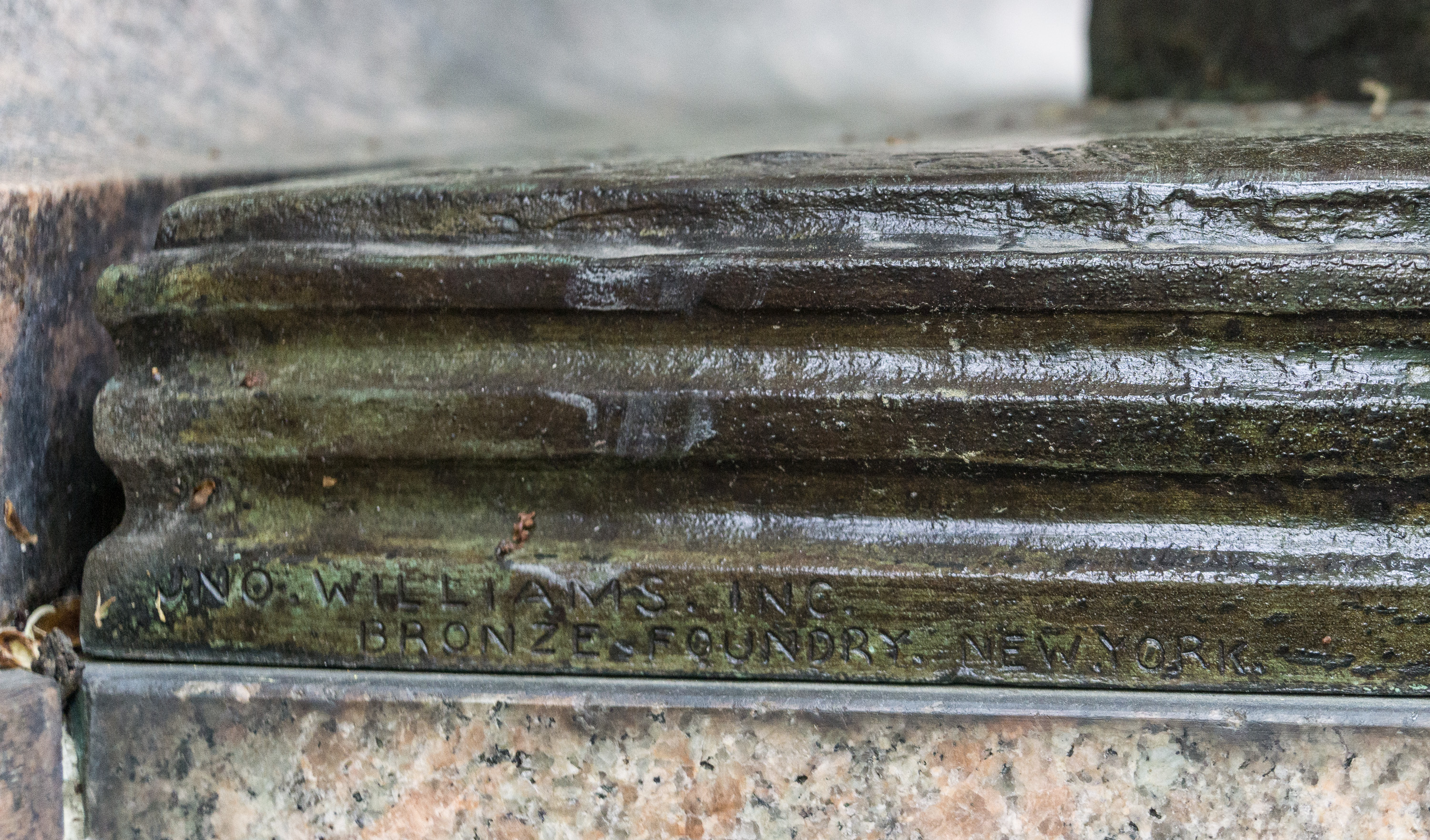
The Jno. Williams, Inc. foundry mark can be seen on the statue of Wendell Phillips in Boston Public Garden

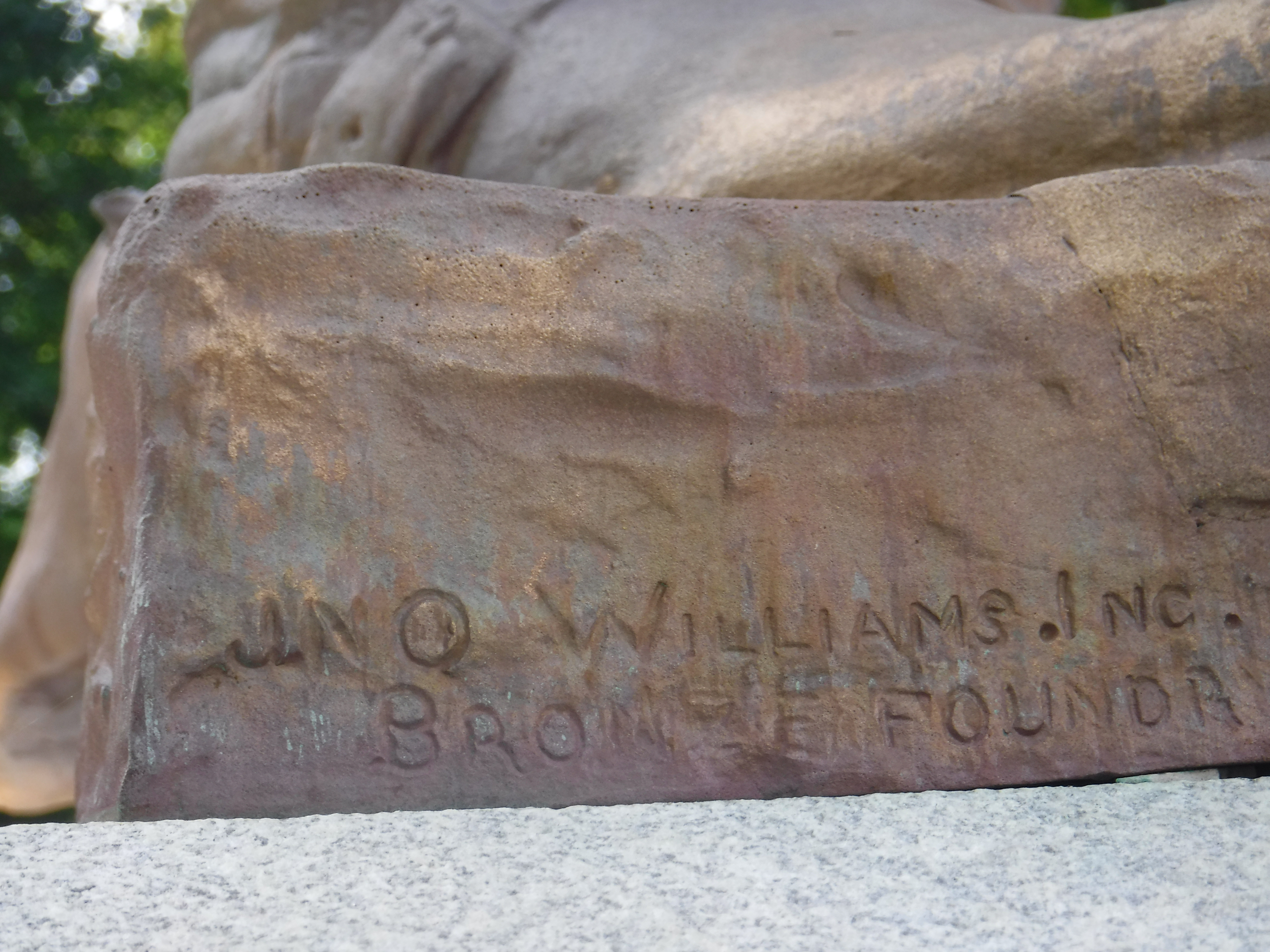
Col. William Crawford Statue Connellsville, Pennsylvania Cast by JNO Williams Inc., Foundry N.Y.

Jno. Williams, Inc. was a prominent American foundry. Located in New York City, it was established in 1875, incorporated in 1905, and dissolved in 1956.

== History ==
The foundry's founder, John Williams, was a former employee of Tiffany & Company. The foundry operated (and perhaps rented out) buildings located at 536, 537, 547 and 549 West 26th Street, which were designed by the architect Charles H. Caldwell. Some of these were built in 1900 while others date from between 1912 and 1914. In the 1990s one of the buildings served as a studio for photographer Annie Leibovitz.

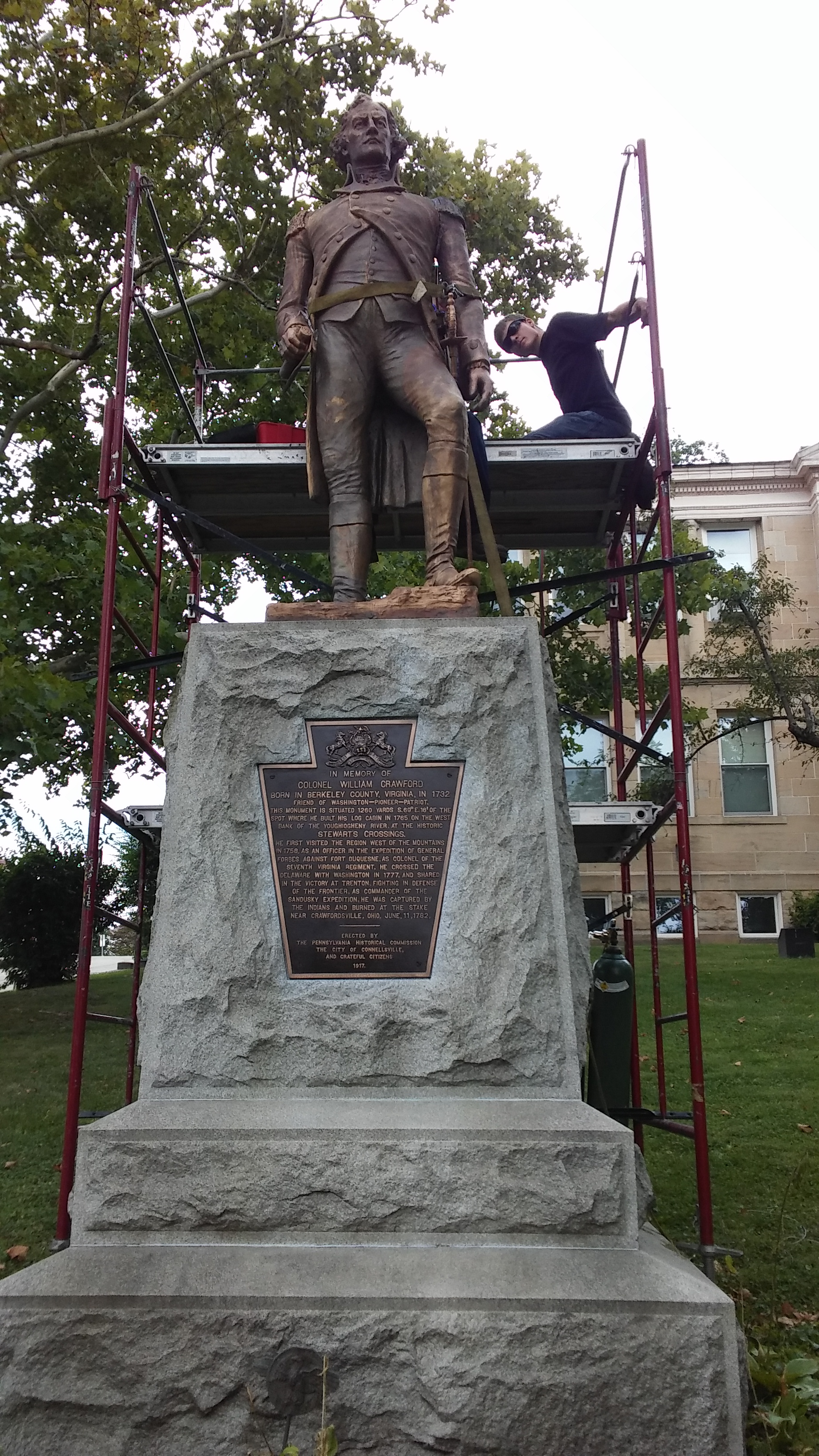
Col. William Crawford Statue Connellsville, Pennsylvania

It was often the foundry of choice for sculptors including Daniel Chester French, Karl Bitter, Louis Amateis, R. Tait McKenzie, Allen George Newman, Augustus Lukeman, Roland Hinton Perry, J. Massey Rhind, Olin Levi Warner, Anna Hyatt Huntington, Edward Kemeys, Frederick MacMonnies, Charles Niehaus, J.Q.A. Ward, Carl Augustus Heber, Charles Keck, Andrew O'Connor, Alexander Phimister Proctor, Anton Schaaf, Francois Tonetti, Gaetan Trentanove, Samuel Kilpatrick (Connellsville, Pennsylvania Artist) and Albert Weinert.

Their architectural work, mostly bronze doors, includes commissions for the Boston Public Library, Library of Congress, U.S. Capitol, Quadriga at Minnesota State Capitol, St. Bartholomew's Church, NYC, as well as Alma Mater at Low Memorial Library, Columbia University; the tigers at Nassau Hall, Princeton University; and the Flagpole at Missouri State Capitol.
