= Highland Park (Pittsburgh park) =

Park in Pittsburgh, Pennsylvania

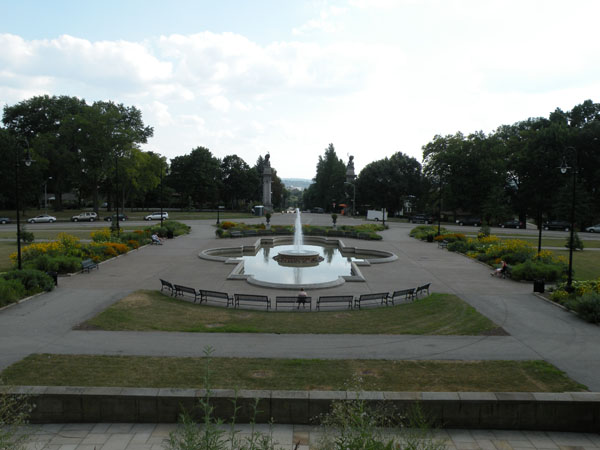
- A view of the park.

- Location within Pittsburgh
- Type: Municipal Park
- Location: Pittsburgh, Pennsylvania
- Coordinates: 40°28′46″N 79°54′56″W
- Area: 377 acres
- Created: 1889
- Operator: City of Pittsburgh Parks & Recreation (CitiParks), Department of Public Works
- Website: pittsburghpa.gov/citiparks/beta/our-parks.html

Highland Park is a large municipal park in the northeastern part of Pittsburgh, Pennsylvania. It is located in Pittsburgh's Highland Park neighborhood. The park extends along the northern and eastern borders of the neighborhood, following the Allegheny River and Negley Run.

== The park ==
Highland Park encompasses the northern region of the neighborhood. Its main entrance is clearly marked by two bronze sculptures by Giuseppe Moretti atop Ionic columns on each side of the Highland Avenue. Its Stanton Avenue entrance features another Moretti pair of sculptures on grand pedestals, depicting two groups of lean, heroic youths taming wild horses.

The park, which contains two of the city's large water reservoirs, offers picnic groves, a Babbling Brook water feature, Lake Carnegie for fishing, the city's only long-course swimming pool, four sand volleyball courts, tennis courts, walking trails, and two children's playgrounds (Farmhouse Park and the "Super Playground"). The Pittsburgh Zoo & Aquarium is also within the park, as is the Washington Boulevard Bike Track, a banked half-mile oval loop for bicyclists.

The park was founded in 1889, and opened in 1893 after Pittsburgh Director of Public Works, Edward Bigelow, spent more than $900,000 in city funds to buy the land, parcel by parcel, from farmers. In 1898, Bigelow's cousin Christopher Lyman Magee created the Pittsburgh Zoo as an attraction to encourage customers to ride streetcar lines which Magee owned and which ran from East Liberty to Highland Park. A 190-year-old farmhouse, which has been used as a park office and summer campsite, still stands within the park near the "Farmhouse Park" children's playground.

== Gallery ==
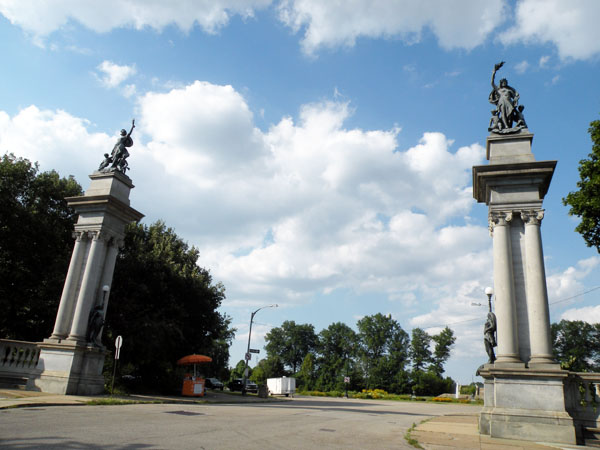
The Welcome Sculptures at the North Highland Avenue entrance of the park, sculpted in 1896 by Giuseppe Moretti.

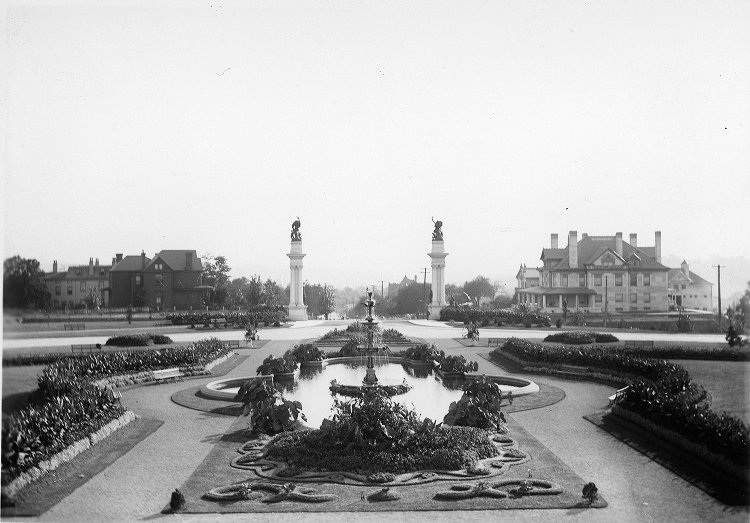
Entrance to Highland Park, circa 1890-1910

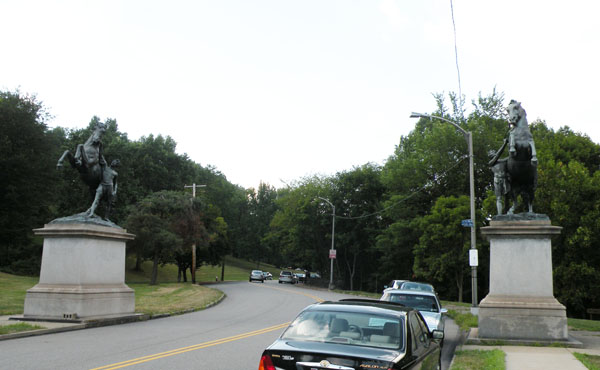
The Horse Tamer Sculptures at the Stanton Avenue entrance of the park, sculpted in 1900 by Giuseppe Moretti.

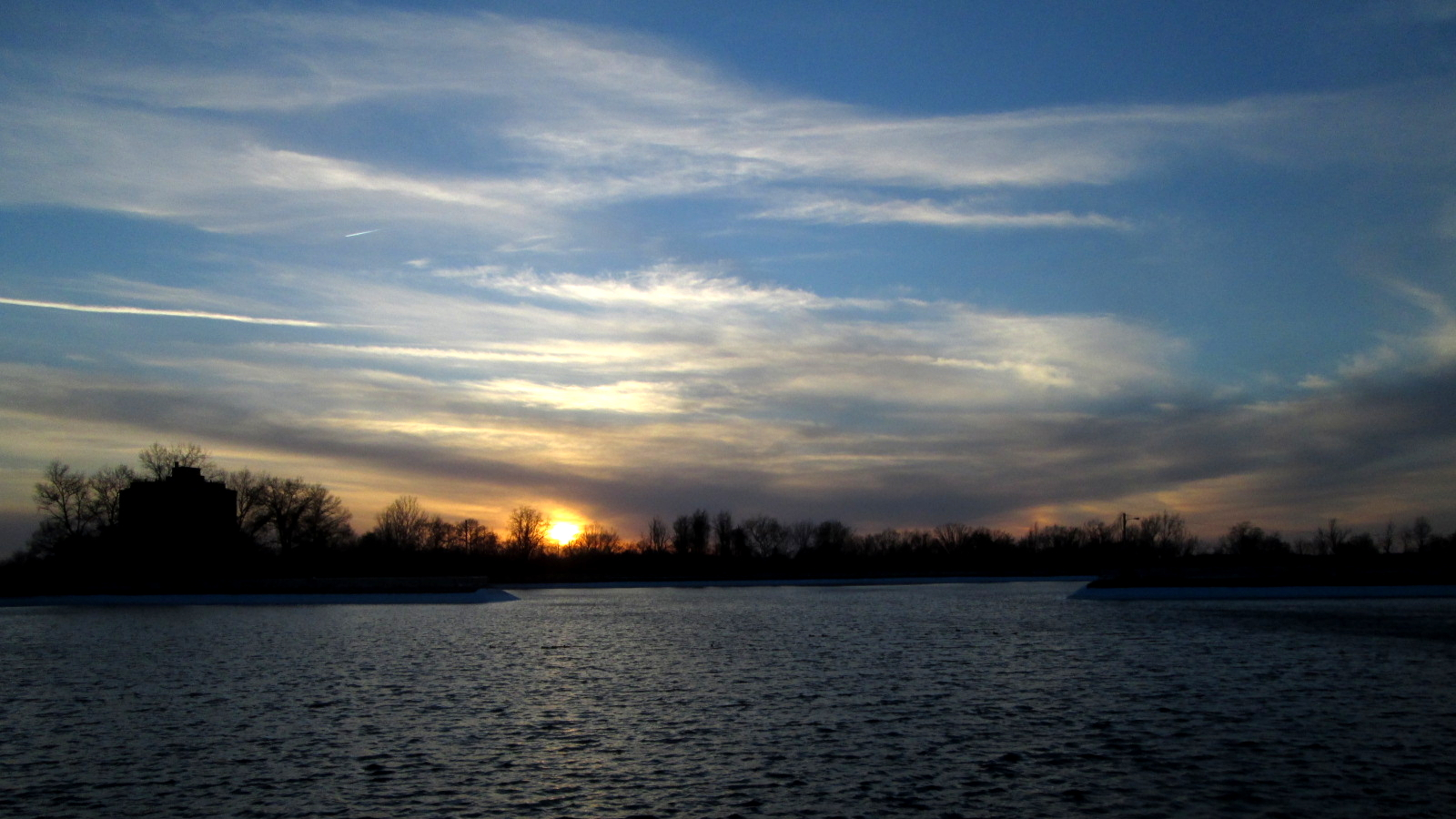
Highland Park Reservoir

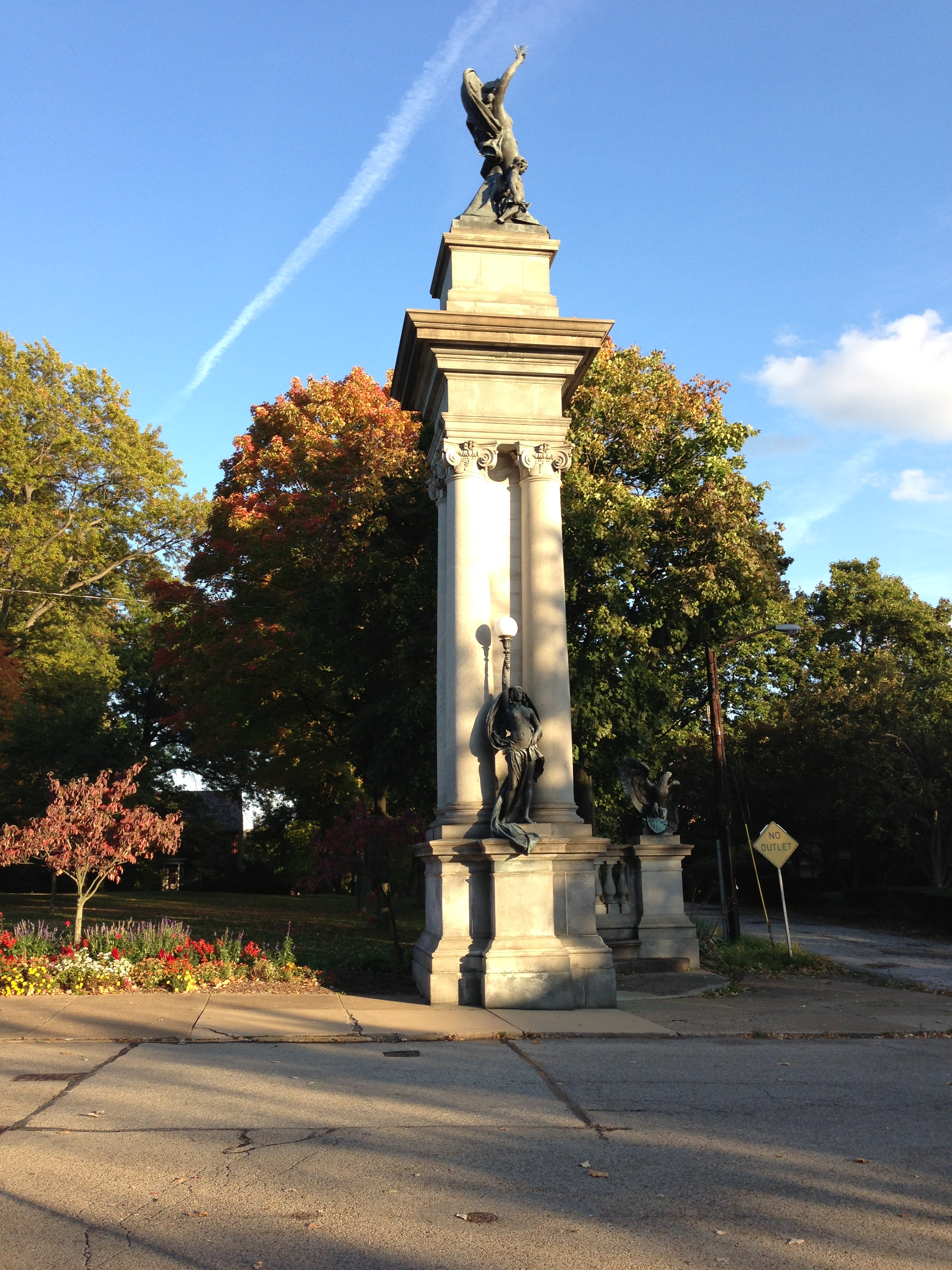
Entrance to Highland Park

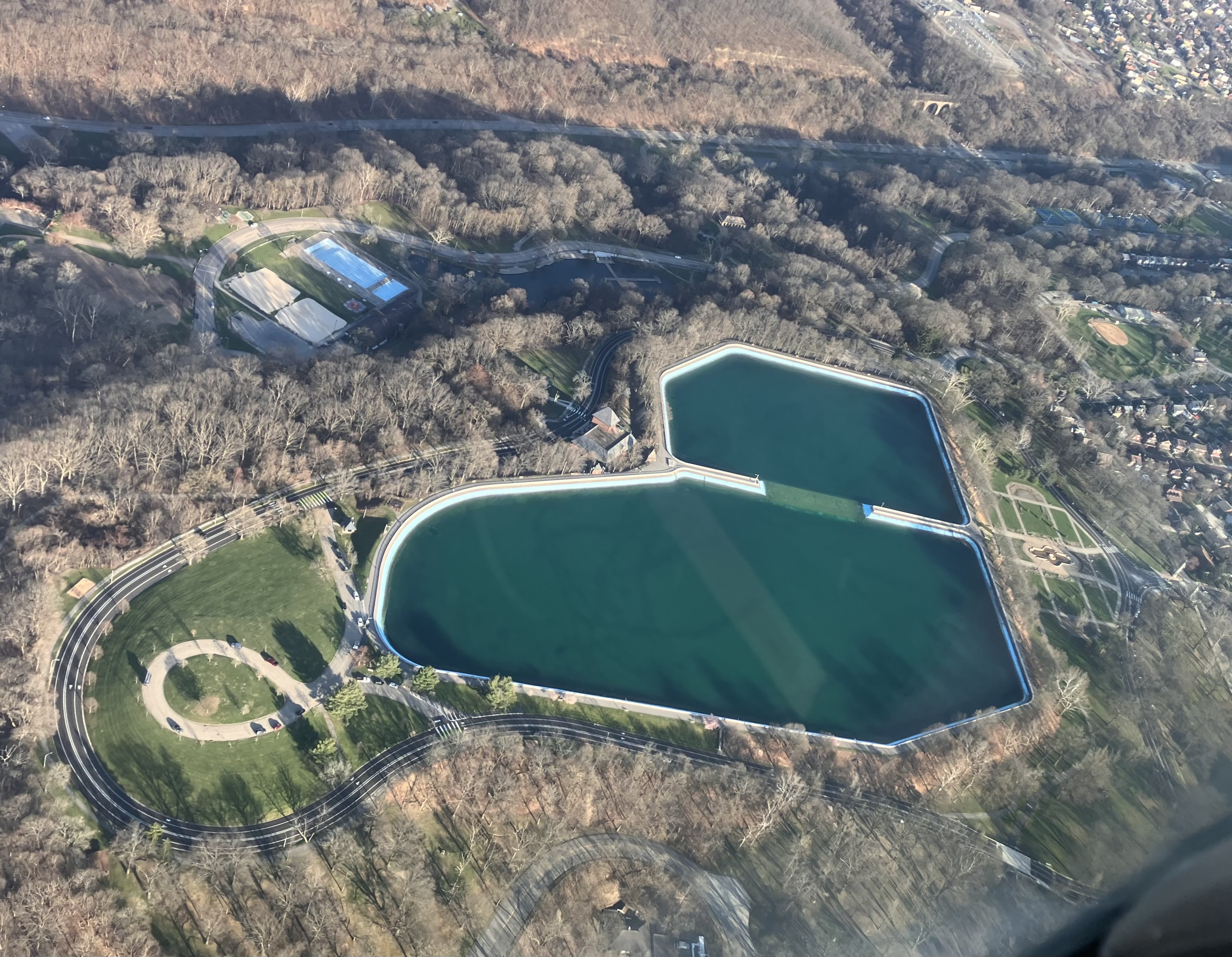
The park offers multiple facilities to its visitors, including a swimming pool (top left) and a picnic area (bottom left).

== See also ==
- Highland Park, the neighborhood the park is in
- Pittsburgh Zoo & PPG Aquarium, which is located within the park
