= Highland Park Bridge (1902) =

Former bridge in Pittsburgh, Pennsylvania, USA

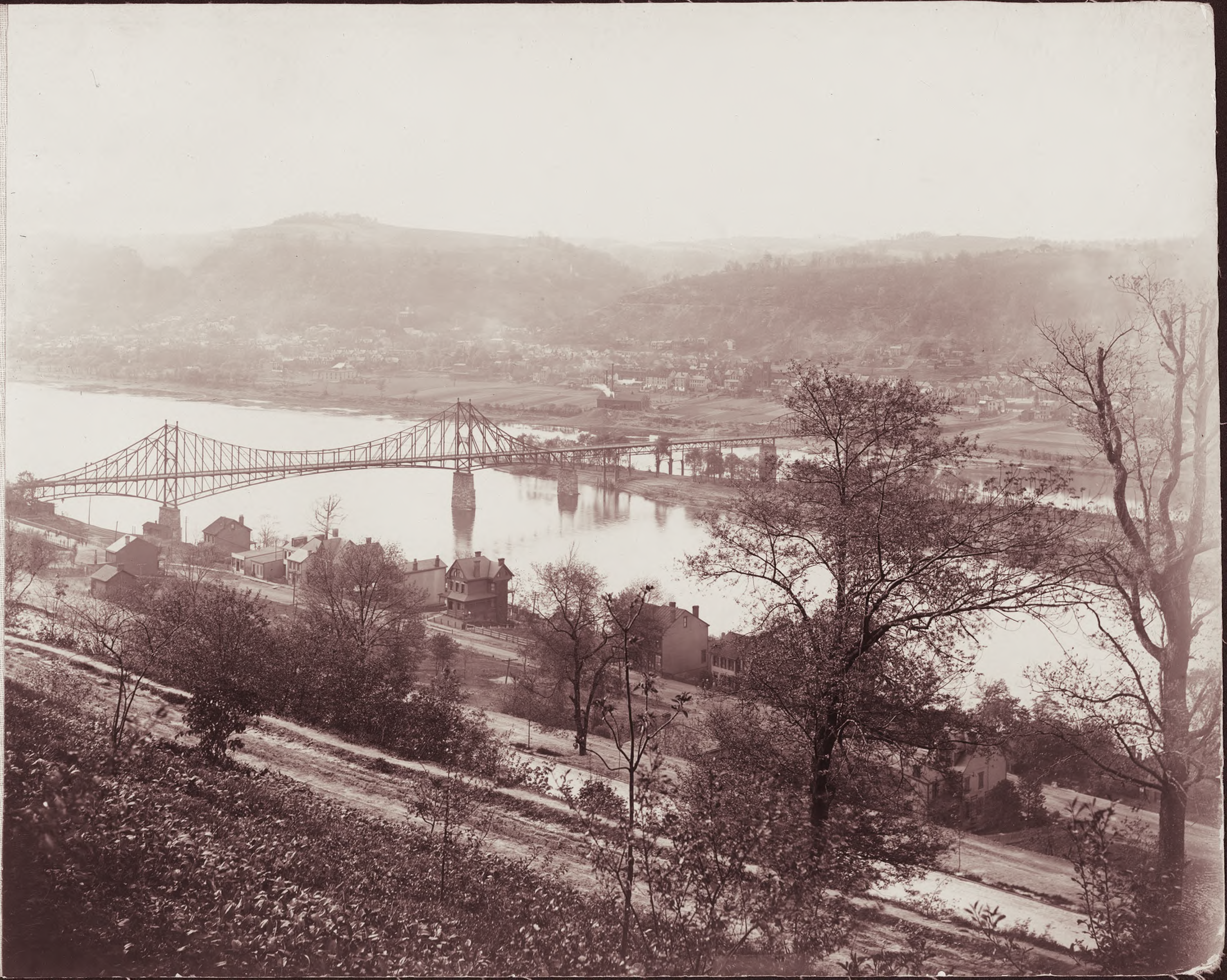
- Coordinates: 40.4910°N 79.9188°W
- Carries: 2 streetcar tracks paved for traffic
- Crosses: Allegheny River
- Locale: 19th Street Sharpsburg and Butler St. at Baker St. (Pittsburgh)
- Other name(s): Sharpsburg Bridge, 19th Street Bridge

Characteristics
- Design: cantilever through truss
- Total length: 1,850 feet (560 m)
- Longest span: 850 feet (260 m)

History
- Opened: 1902
- Closed: 1938

Location
- Interactive map of Highland Park Bridge (1902)

The 1902 Highland Park Bridge was a cantilever through truss bridge that carried two streetcar tracks across the Allegheny River and Sixmile Island between the Pittsburgh neighborhood of Highland Park and Sharpsburg, Pennsylvania. By the 1930s, the bridge had become notorious for its narrowness and chronic maintenance problems, prompting suggestions for replacement. This bridge, known also as the Highland Park Bridge opened in 1938.

== Location ==
The bridge was erected in two sections, with the cantilever on the Pittsburgh side of Sixmile Island and a truss bridge on the Sharpsburg side. It was situated 400 feet (120 m) downstream from the 1938 Highland Park bridge, at the then downstream from the end of the island. However, contemporary maps and pictures imply that the island has moved almost its entire length downstream, making the bridge location the current (2010) upstream end of the island.
