= Union Project =

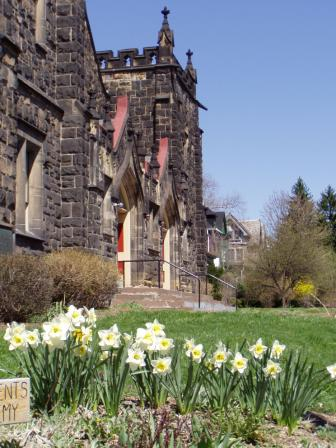

Union Project, located in Pittsburgh, Pennsylvania, and founded in 2001 by a group of young Pittsburghers, is a non-profit organization located at the literal intersection of two of Pittsburgh's most diverse and historic neighborhoods—East Liberty and Highland Park. It houses offices for several nonprofit organizations, offers a variety of community programming, maintains a full ceramics studio, and rents space for community use.

Union Project takes its name from one of its previous occupants—the Union Baptist Church. The founding members bought an ailing church on the corner of Stanton Avenue and N. Negley Avenue. Built in 1903, the church had been home to a number of congregations until it was abandoned in the mid-1990s. Purchased for $125,000, the building was restored through a $1.6 million capital campaign. Funds were raised through a process of grassroots organizing, public grants, and private contributions.

The project is run by a small full-time staff, a board of directors, part-time interns, and a dedicated team of community volunteers.

== Activities ==
Currently, the building houses a cafe and nine permanent office tenants, including; the Girls Coalition of Southwestern PA, Open Door church, America Votes, Jackson-Clark Partners, and PULSE. It makes additional rental space available: a conference room, a semi-circular atrium space, and a Great Hall.

In order to restore the building's original stained glass windows, Union Project offered a series of workshops for artists of all skill levels to learn the art of stained glass restoration. During the project, the building's historic windows were cleaned, repaired, and re-installed by more than 200 community members. The restoration took ten years to complete.

Union Project has developed a clay cooperative for artists in the Pittsburgh area. Clay artists pay a monthly fee for access to clay, glazes, wheels, kilns and other tools and materials. Additionally, Union Project offers ceramics classes for artists of various skill levels throughout the year. Ceramics@UP was one of many Pittsburgh locations to present and host events for the National Council on Education in the Ceramic Arts (NCECA) conference in March 2008.
