= James Scott House =

Historic house in Pennsylvania, United States

- U.S. National Register of Historic Places
- U.S. Historic district – Contributing property
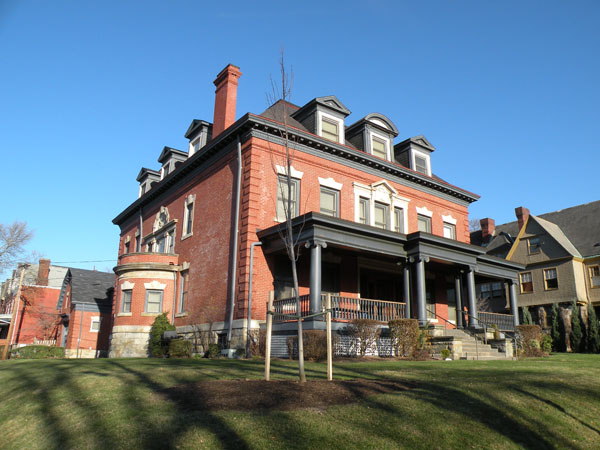

- Location within Pittsburgh Location within Pennsylvania Location within the United States
- Location: 5635 Stanton Avenue (Highland Park), Pittsburgh, Pennsylvania, USA
- Coordinates: 40°28′16.36″N 79°55′28.21″W
- Built: 1900
- Built by: Rose and Fisher, Inc.
- Architectural style: Colonial Revival
- Part of: Highland Park Residential Historic District (ID07000888)
- NRHP reference No.: 97000515

Significant dates
- Added to NRHP: May 30, 1997
- Designated CP: August 30, 2007

The James Scott House (also known as Altholl), which is located at 5635 Stanton Avenue in the Highland Park neighborhood of Pittsburgh, Pennsylvania, was built in 1900 in the Colonial Revival style. A carriage house was added two years later.

The house was added to the National Register of Historic Places on May 30, 1997.

== History and architectural features ==
James Scott was an executive for U.S. Steel and an immigrant from Scotland. The construction of his house was the starting point of an elopement that was covered by the national press. Scott's daughter Helen eloped on October 10, 1906, with Frederick Fairbanks, son of Vice President Charles W. Fairbanks. The couple were married on October 11 in Steubenville, Ohio and their story made the front page of the New York Times the next day.

The house was added to the National Register of Historic Places on May 30, 1997.
