= Fulton Elementary School =

- U.S. National Register of Historic Places
- U.S. Historic district – Contributing property
- Pittsburgh Landmark – PHLF
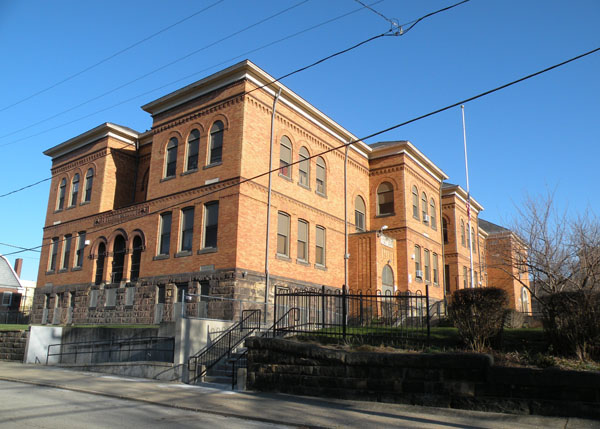

- Location within Pittsburgh Location within Pennsylvania Location within the United States
- Location: 5799 Hampton St., Pittsburgh, Pennsylvania
- Coordinates: 40°28′30″N 79°55′19″W
- Area: 1 acre (0.40 ha)
- Built: 1894
- Architect: Charles M. Bartberger, M. Nirdlinger
- Architectural style: Art Deco, Romanesque
- Website: Fulton Elementary School
- Part of: Highland Park Residential Historic District (ID07000888)
- MPS: Pittsburgh Public Schools TR
- NRHP reference No.: 86002669

Significant dates
- Added to NRHP: September 30, 1986
- Designated CP: August 30, 2007
- Designated PHLF: 2002

The Fulton Elementary School (also known as Fulton Academy, and Pittsburgh Fulton PreK-5) is a public elementary school in the Highland Park neighborhood of Pittsburgh, Pennsylvania. It was built in 1894 and was later added to in 1929. It was listed on the National Register of Historic Places in 1986.
