= Frederick G. Scheibler Jr. =

American architect (1872–1958)

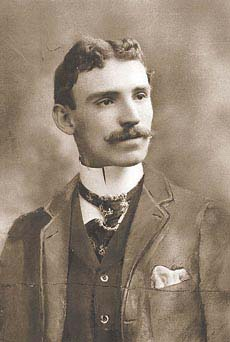
Architect Frederick G. Scheibler Jr. (Scheibler portrait courtesy of Carnegie Mellon University Architecture Archives)

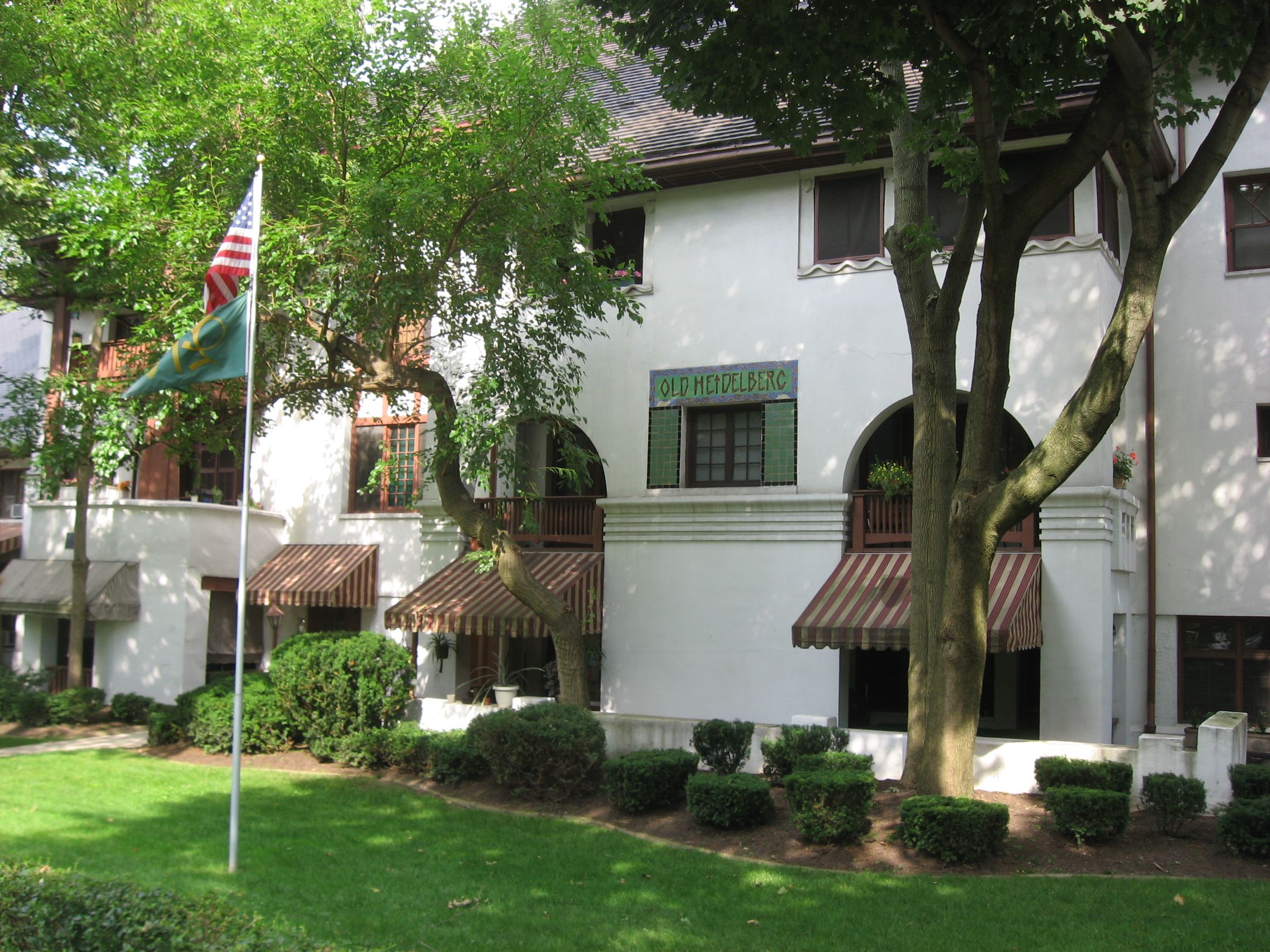
Old Heidelberg Apartments (1905)

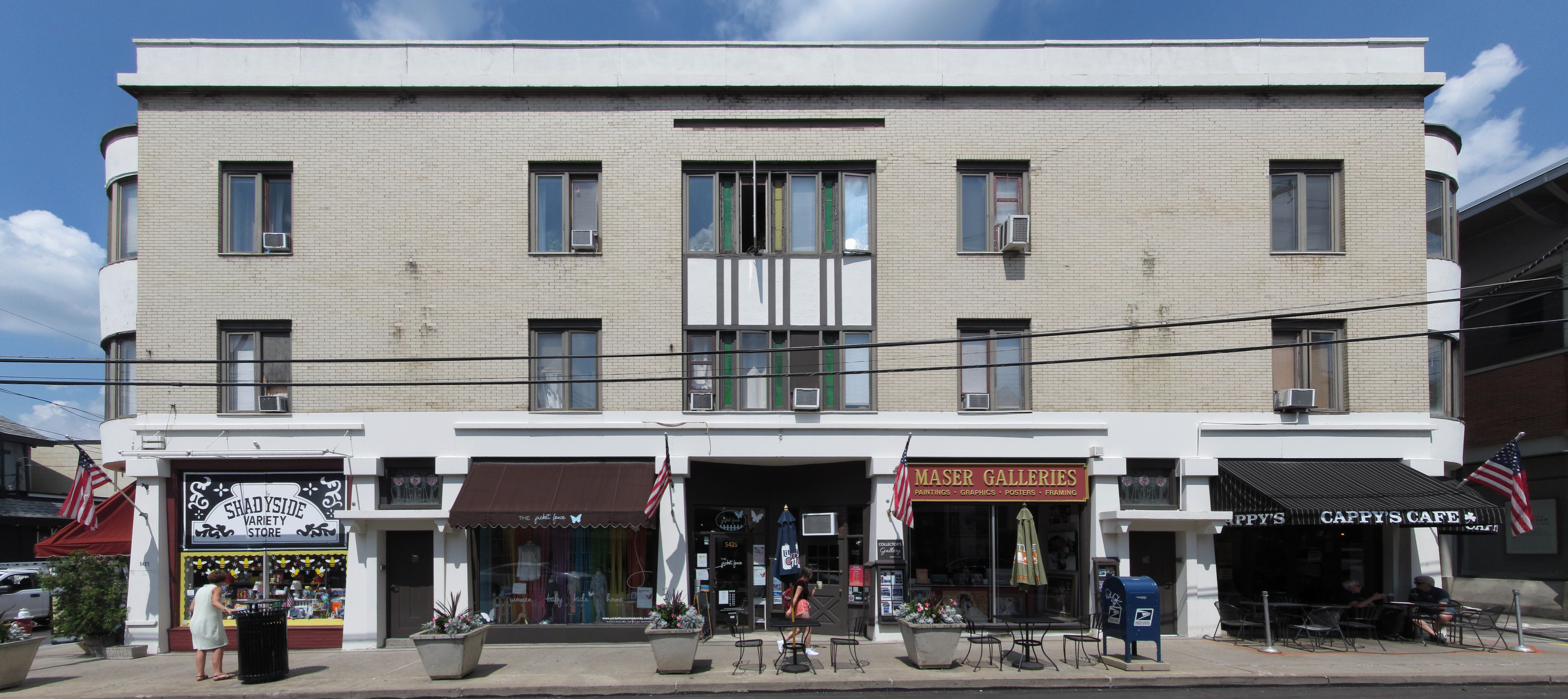
Minnetonka Building, Shadyside, 2021-08-25, 04

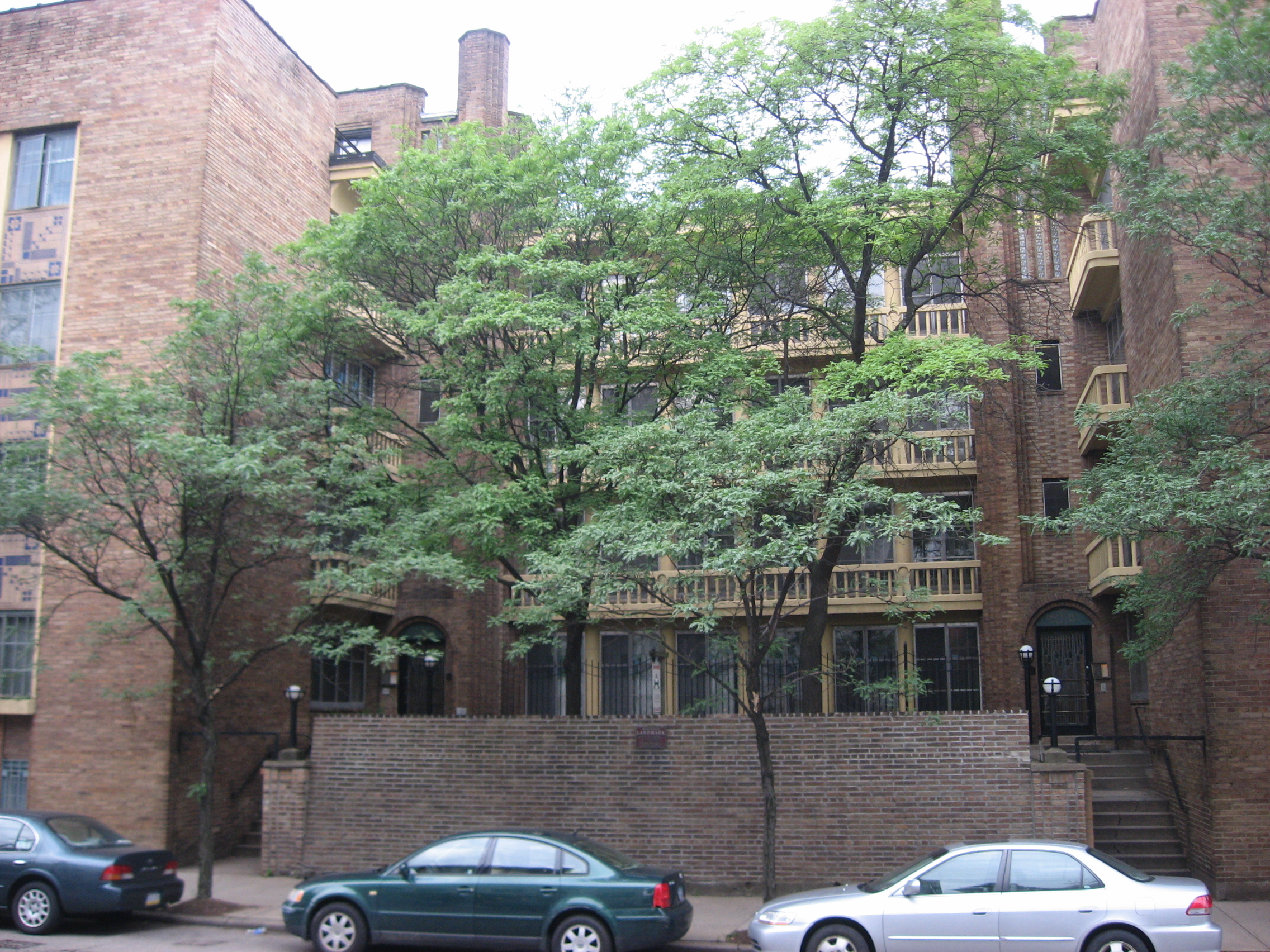
Highland Towers Apartments (1913)

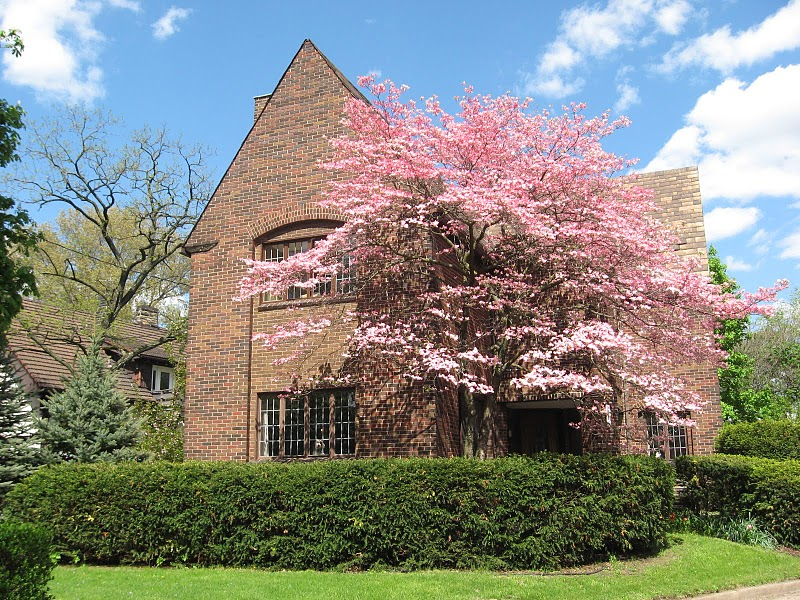
Starr house (1927)

Frederick Gustavus Scheibler Jr. (May 12, 1872 – June 15, 1958) was an American architect.

He was born in Pittsburgh, Pennsylvania, to William Augustus and Eleanor Amelia (Seidel) Scheibler. Although his father's name was William, Frederick was a junior because he was named after his uncle Frederick. His paternal grandparents had emigrated from Düsseldorf, Germany. He attended local public schools but dropped out at age 16 to become an apprentice architect. From 1888 to 1898 he trained in the Pittsburgh firms of Henry Moser, V. Wyse Thalman, and Longfellow, Alden & Harlow.

Scheibler's body of architectural work, nearly 150 commissions over five decades, was in early 20th century Pittsburgh's neighborhoods and suburbs. He is best known for having taken inspiration from international progressive movements like Art Nouveau, the Viennese Secession, and the Arts and Crafts Movement.

== Notable commissions ==
In chronological order:

- Kitzmiller House (1901), 2526 South Braddock Avenue, Swissvale, Pennsylvania
- Old Heidelberg Apartments (1905), 401–423 South Braddock Avenue, Point Breeze, Pittsburgh
- Miller House (1905), 7506 Trevanion Avenue, Regent Square, Swissvale, Pennsylvania
- Linwood Apartments (1906), 6801 McPherson Boulevard, North Point Breeze, Pittsburgh
- Whitehall Apartments (1906), 201 East End Avenue, Point Breeze, Pittsburgh
- Row houses (1907), 7800 Inglenook Place, Wilkinsburg, Pennsylvania
- Ament House (1907–1908), 1204 Hulton Road, Oakmont, Pennsylvania
- Minnetonka Building (1908), retail with apartments on upper floors, 5425–5431 Walnut Street, Shadyside, Pittsburgh
- Hamnett House (1910), 579 Briarcliff Road, Point Breeze, Pittsburgh
- Hamilton Cottages (1910–1914), 5635–5663 Beacon Street, Squirrel Hill, Pittsburgh
- Meado'cots (1912), row houses, Rosedale and Madiera Streets, Homewood, Pittsburgh
- Vilsack Row (1912), row houses, 1659–1693 Jancey Street, Morningside, Pittsburgh
- Highland Towers Apartments (1913), 340–342 South Highland Avenue, Shadyside, Pittsburgh
- Hellmund House (1915), 7510 Trevanion Avenue, Regent Square, Swissvale, Pennsylvania
- Barnes-Ambrose House (1916), 592 Briarcliff Road, Point Breeze, Pittsburgh
- Row houses (1919), 1300 Singer Place, Wilkinsburg, Pennsylvania
- Parkstone Dwellings (1922), double duplex, 6937–6943 Penn Avenue, North Point Breeze, Pittsburgh
- Harter House (1923), 2557 Beechwood Boulevard, Squirrel Hill, Pittsburgh
- Klages House (1923), 5525 Beverly Place, Highland Park, Pittsburgh
- Starr Houses (1927), 1715 and 1717 Denniston St, Squirrel Hill, Pittsburgh
  - A Starr House is also famous as being the residence of Billy Conn and his family from the early 1940s through the late 1990s.
