= Welcome Sculptures (Pittsburgh) =

Sculpted statues by Giuseppe Moretti

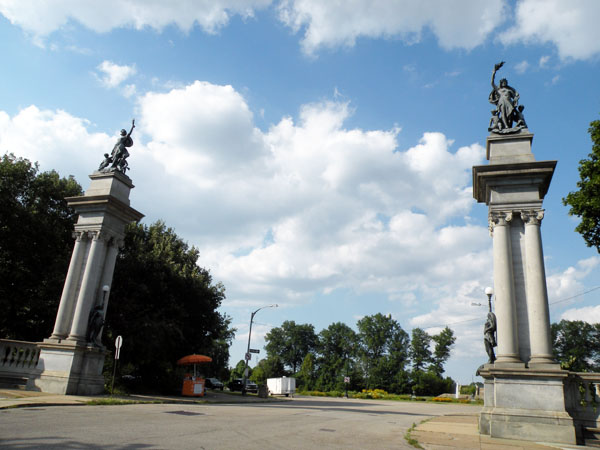

- Location within Pittsburgh
- 40°28′42.7″N 79°54′57.7″W
- Location: North Highland Avenue entrance of Highland Park, Pittsburgh, Pennsylvania, USA

History
- Built: 1896

The Welcome Sculptures at the North Highland Avenue entrance of Highland Park in Pittsburgh, Pennsylvania, are sculpted statues by Giuseppe Moretti that were erected in 1896. These sculptures are on the List of City of Pittsburgh historic designations.
