= Highland Park Bridge =

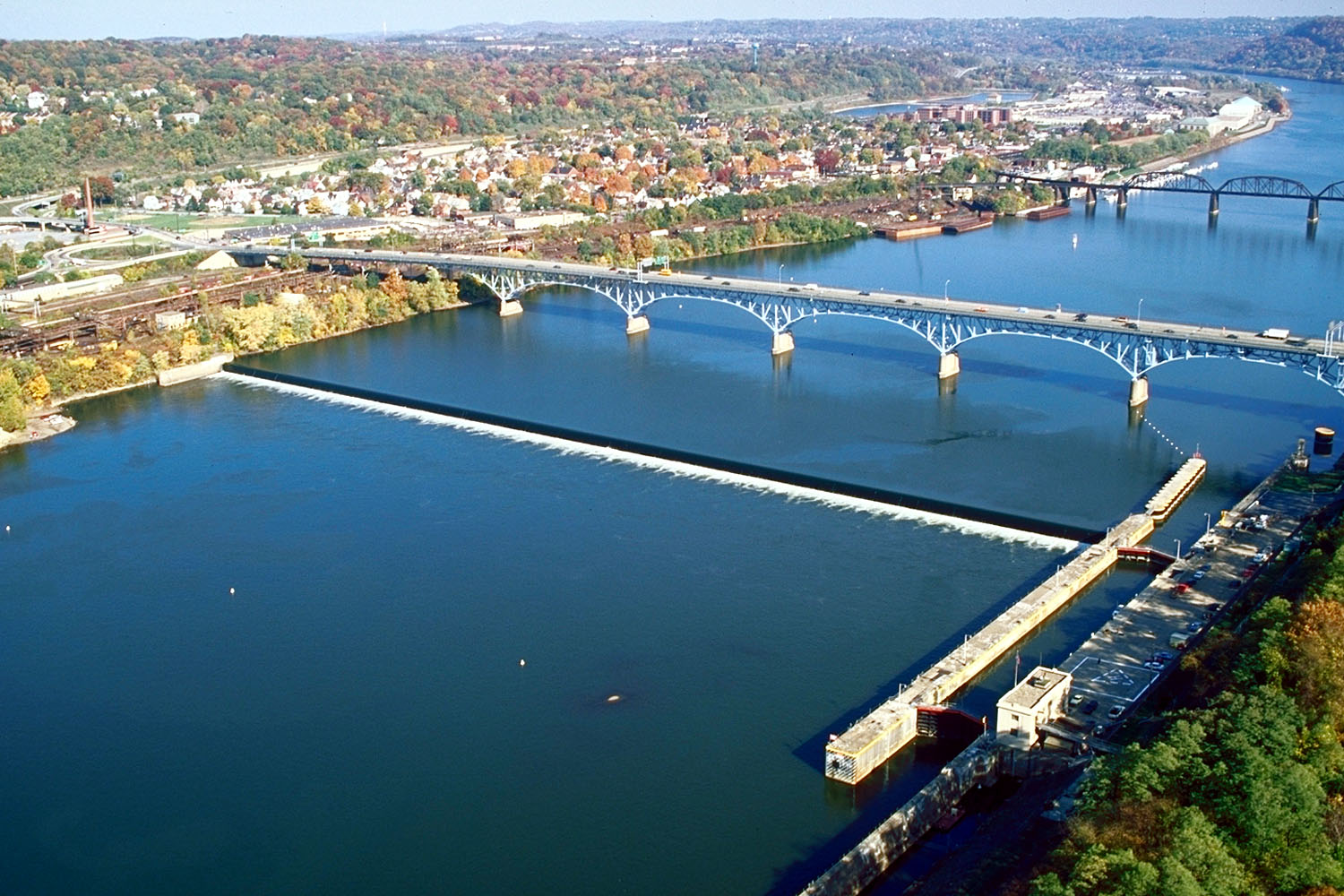
- Coordinates: 40.4891°N 79.9120°W
- Carries: 4 lanes of traffic
- Crosses: Allegheny River
- Locale: Pittsburgh and Aspinwall

Characteristics
- Design: Truss bridge
- Longest span: 266 feet (81 m)
- Clearance below: 50 feet (15 m)

History
- Designer: Sidney Shubin
- Construction start: November 6, 1937
- Opened: June 22, 1939

Location
- Interactive map of Highland Park Bridge

The Highland Park Bridge is a truss bridge that carries vehicular traffic across the Allegheny River between the Pittsburgh neighborhood of Highland Park and the suburb of Aspinwall.

It replaced a much narrower 1902 streetcar bridge that was ill-equipped to handle heavy commuter traffic, as part of the process of suburbanization in the hills northeast of the city.

== History ==
The bridge was designed by Sidney A. Shubin, chief bridge design engineer of Allegheny County, who also designed the South Tenth Street Bridge and Homestead High Level Bridge. Construction of the bridge began on November 6, 1937 and was completed in June 1939. The bridge cost $2.5 million to construct and was opened on June 22, 1939. Two workers were killed during the construction on October 14, 1938 when a 68-ton crane fell from the bridge.

In 1963, the bridges approaches was reconstructed this was done to allow it to serve an exit with PA 28. 23 years later, the near 50 year old bridge was rehabilitated to extended its useful life.

It is designated by PennDOT as SR 8082.

== See also ==
- List of crossings of the Allegheny River
