= Horse Tamer Sculptures (Pittsburgh) =

Horse Tamers
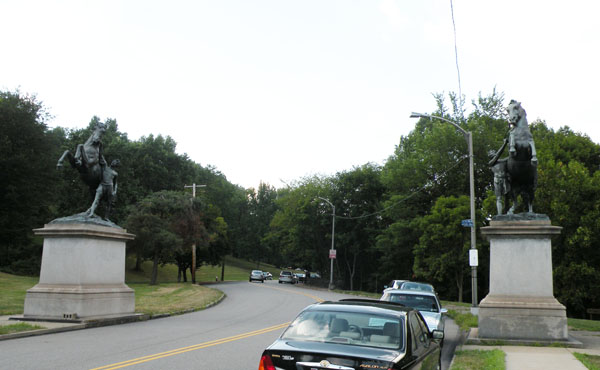

- Location within Pittsburgh
- 40°28′30.57″N 79°54′38.69″W
- Location: Stanton Avenue entrance to Highland Park, Pittsburgh, Pennsylvania, USA

History
- Built: 1900

The Horse Tamers are a pair of larger-than-life sculptures in Pittsburgh, Pennsylvania, which are located at the Stanton Avenue entrance to Highland Park.

== History and design features ==
These sculptures are copies of the famous Marly Horses (Chevaux de Marly) (marble, 1739–45), which were created by sculptor Guillaume Coustou the Elder, which flank the entrance to the Champs-Élysées in Paris. The Highland Park sculptures were modeled by sculptor Giuseppe Moretti, and installed in 1900.

Each depicts a youth attempting to control a rearing horse. The bronze sculptures are approximately fifteen feet (4.6 m) tall, and stand upon granite bases which are approximately eleven feet (3.4 m) tall.

The sculptures are on the City of Pittsburgh's list of designated historic landmarks.
