= Highland Towers Apartments =

- U.S. National Register of Historic Places
- Pittsburgh Landmark – PHLF
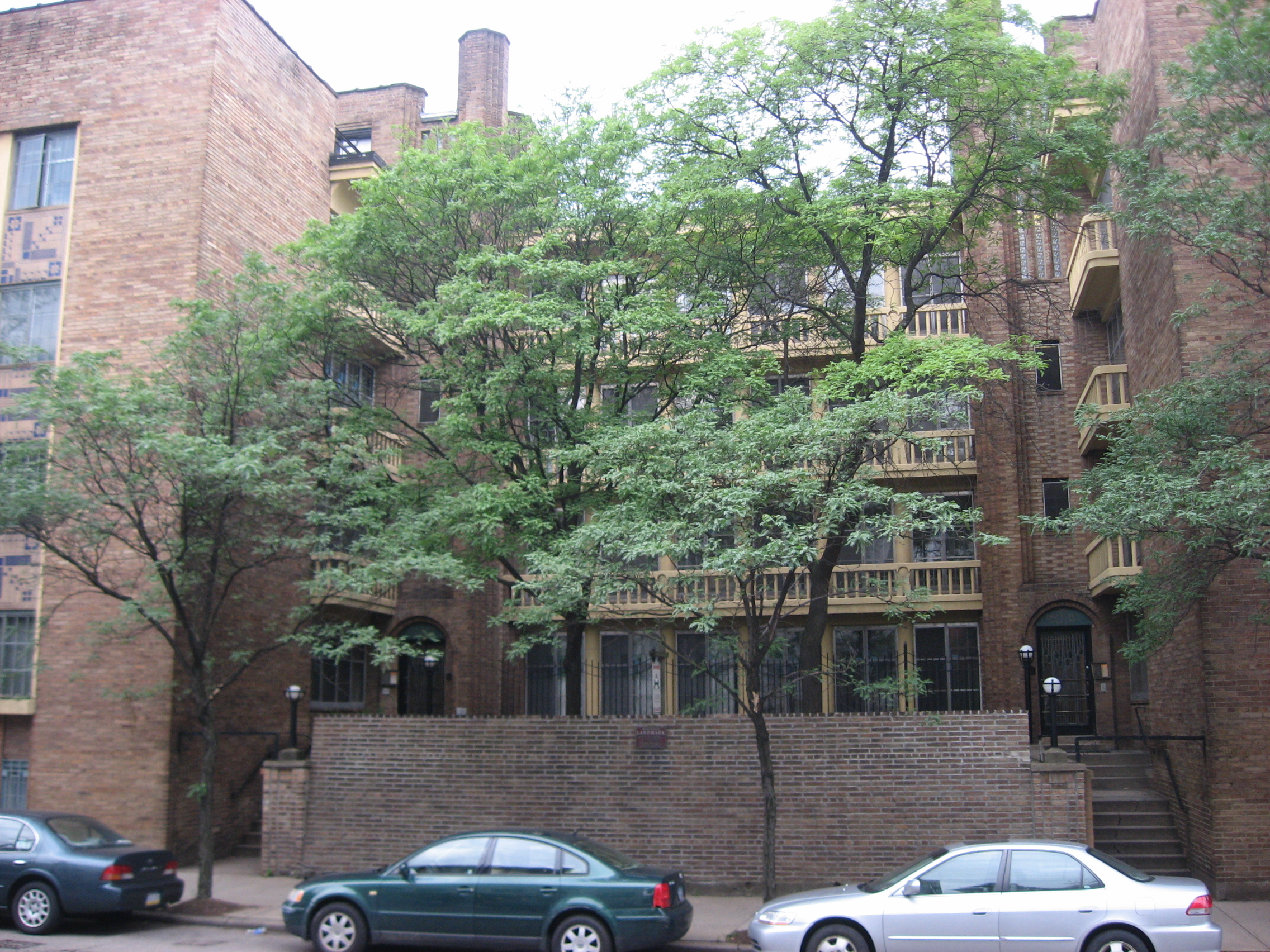

- Location within Pittsburgh Location within Pennsylvania Location within the United States
- Location: 340 S. Highland Ave., Pittsburgh, Pennsylvania
- Coordinates: 40°27′21″N 79°55′32″W
- Area: 0.8 acres (0.32 ha)
- Built: 1913
- Architect: Scheibler, Frederick
- Architectural style: Art Deco
- NRHP reference No.: 76001595

Significant dates
- Added to NRHP: September 28, 1976
- Designated PHLF: 1976

The Highland Towers Apartments is an historic building which is located in the Shadyside neighborhood of Pittsburgh, Pennsylvania. Built in 1913, it was listed on the National Register of Historic Places in 1976.

== History and architectural features ==
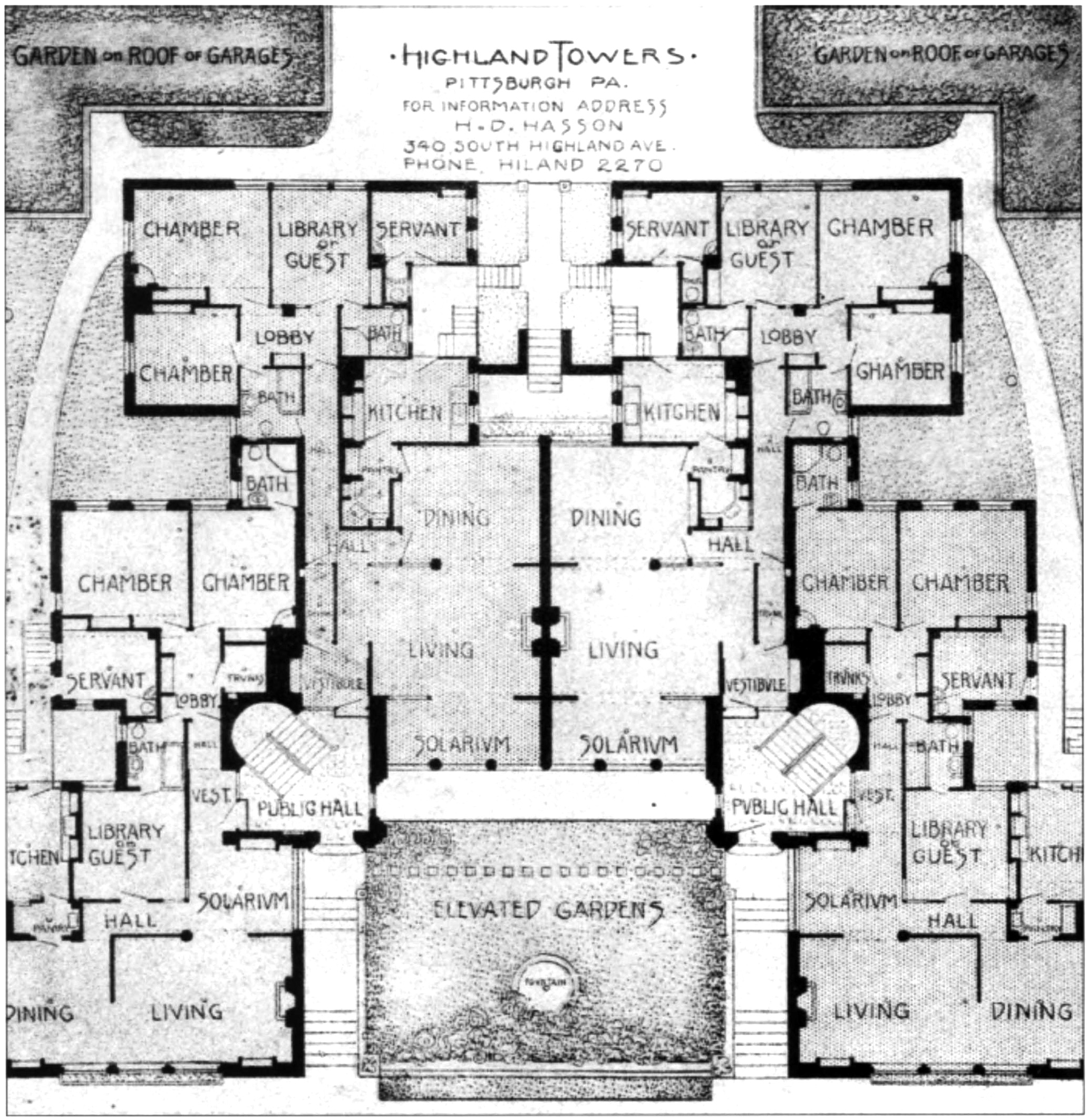
First floor plan from 1914 marketing brochure

This apartment building was designed by Pittsburgh native Frederick G. Scheibler Jr., who designed over a dozen buildings in the area. The U-shaped structure has four floors of apartments and a raised basement.

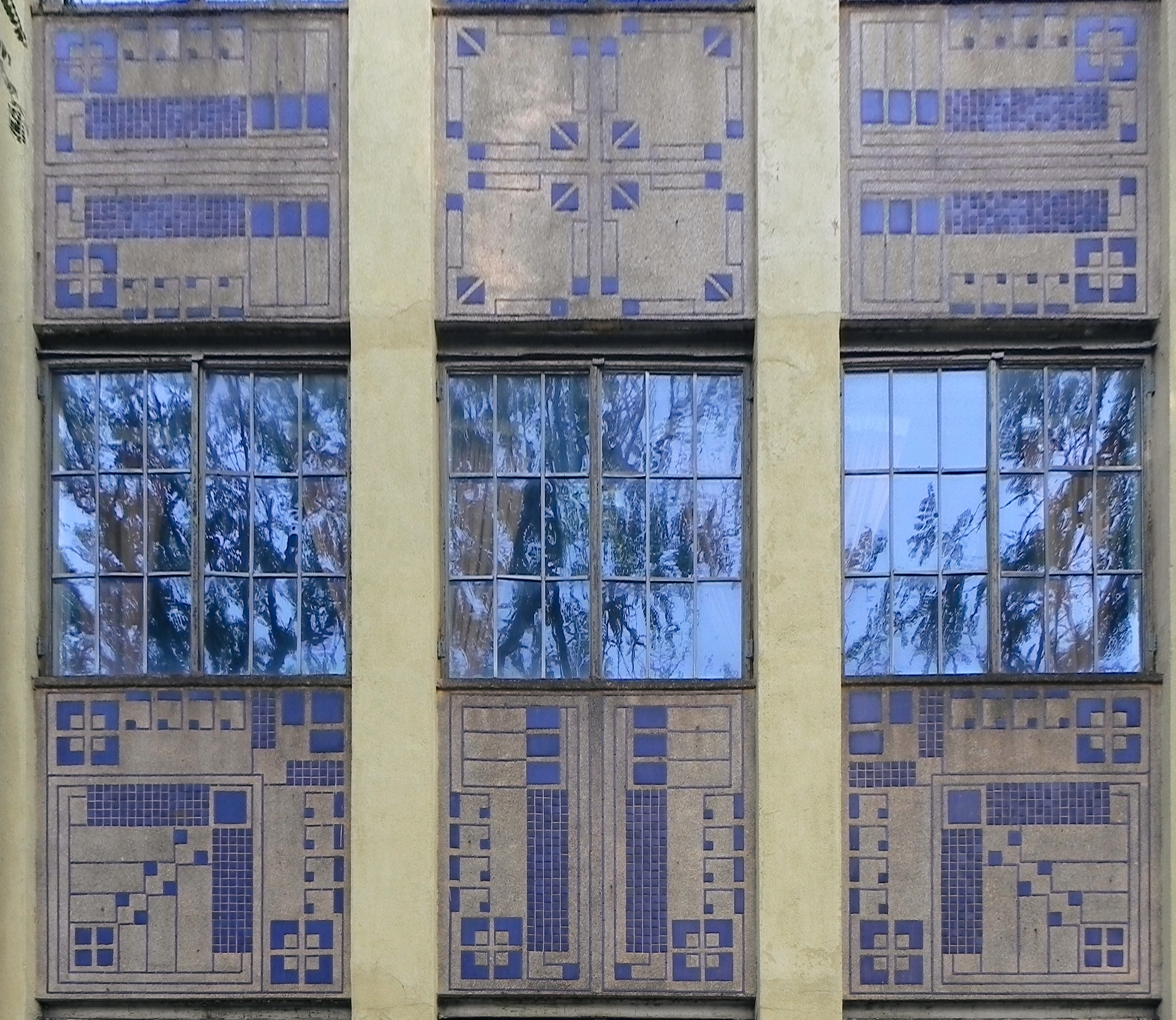
Tilework on the Highland Towers apartment building

The façade is tapestry brick in yellow, bronze, tan and brown. Scheibler placed decorative tilework between the windows; his tilework was based on a fabric designed by Peter Behrens.
