= Old Heidelberg Apartments =

- U.S. National Register of Historic Places
- City of Pittsburgh Historic Structure
- Pittsburgh Landmark – PHLF
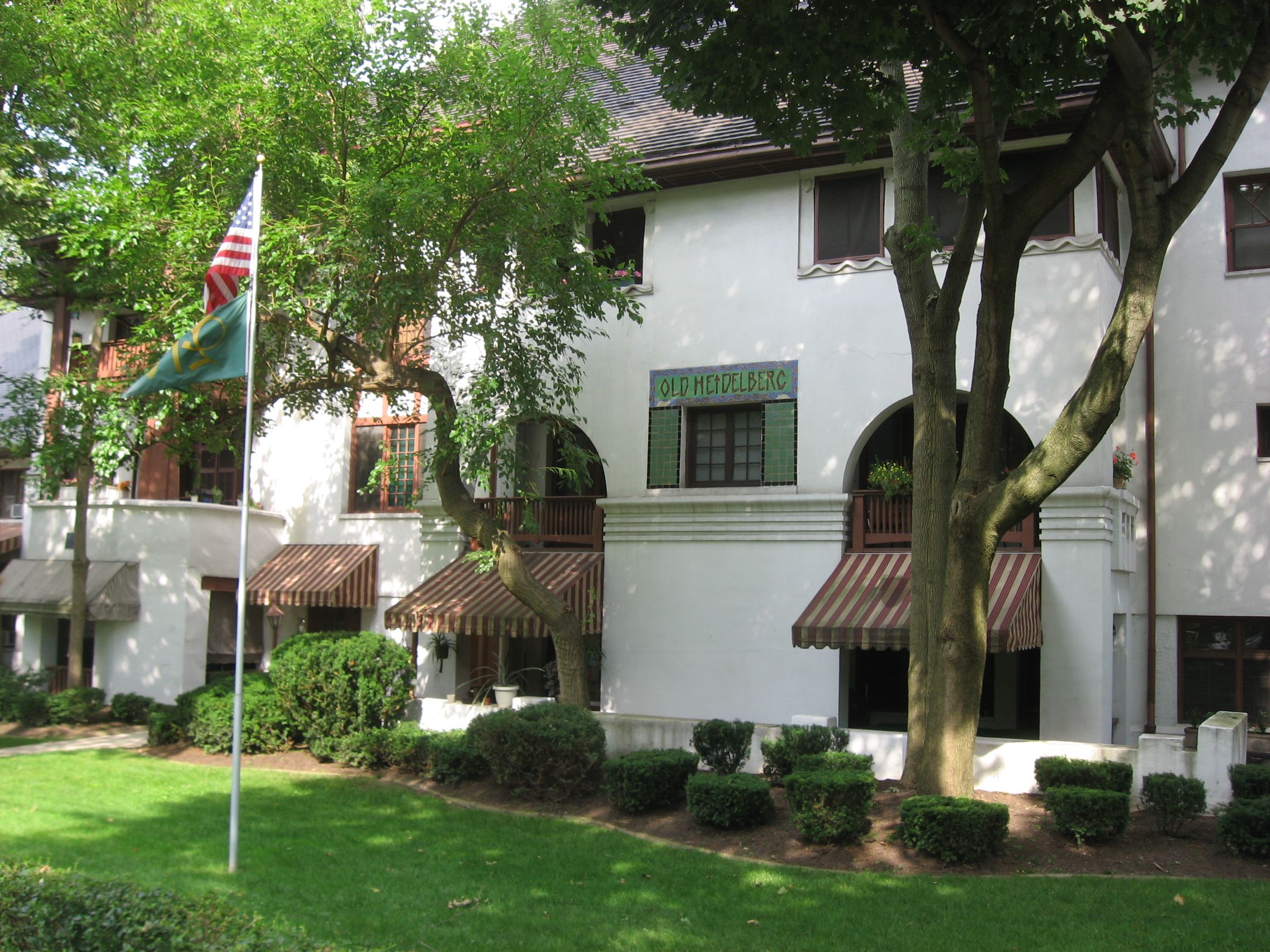

- Location within Pittsburgh Location within Pennsylvania Location within the United States
- Location: 401–423 South Braddock Ave. at Waverly St., Pittsburgh, Pennsylvania
- Coordinates: 40°26′38″N 79°53′45″W
- Area: 1 acre (0.40 ha)
- Built: 1905
- Architect: Frederick G. Scheibler, Jr.
- Architectural style: Modern Movement, "Proto-modern"
- NRHP reference No.: 76001596

Significant dates
- Added to NRHP: May 04, 1976
- Designated CPHS: March 15, 1974
- Designated PHLF: 1970

The Old Heidelberg Apartments in the Point Breeze neighborhood of Pittsburgh, Pennsylvania is a building from 1905. It was listed on the National Register of Historic Places in 1976.

The Old Heidelberg Apartment building in Pittsburgh's east end neighborhood of Park Place was designed by notable architect Frederick G. Scheibler. His client, Robinson and Bruckman, charged him with designing an apartment building that would fit into the neighborhood of private homes. To do this, Scheibler used a steep sheltered roof, timber-framed porches, and a stucco surface to make the building appear as a country house reminiscent of old-world Europe.
