= Highland Park Residential Historic District =

Historic district in Pennsylvania, United States

- U.S. National Register of Historic Places
- U.S. Historic district
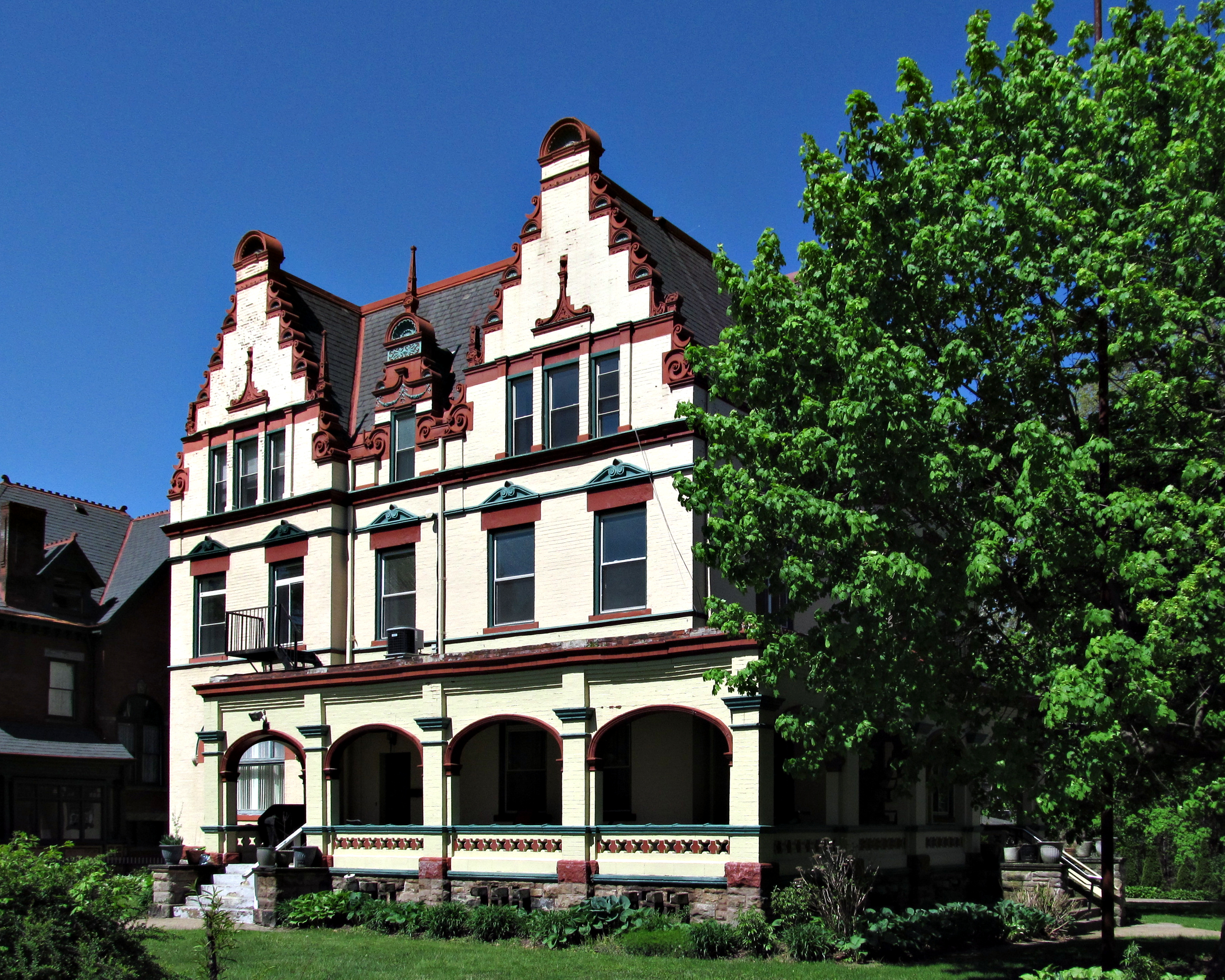
- House at 935 North Highland Avenue

- Location within Pennsylvania
- Location: Morningside, Pittsburgh, Pennsylvania, USA
- Coordinates: 40°28′32.88″N 79°55′47.71″W
- Area: Roughly bounded by Highland Park, Heth's Run and Heth's Avenue, Chislett Street, Stanton Avenue and Jackson Street
- Architect: Multiple (Frederick Sauer, Frederick Scheibler, etc.)
- Architectural style: Colonial Revival, Tudor Revival
- NRHP reference No.: 07000888
- Added to NRHP: August 30, 2007

The Highland Park Residential Historic District is a historic district in the Highland Park neighborhood of Pittsburgh, Pennsylvania, United States. Almost 2,000 buildings are in the district, most of them residences. Many of the houses in this district were built from the 1860s into the 1930s, and are constructed in several Victorian and early 20th century styles.

The district is listed on the National Register of Historic Places.
