= Highland Park (Pittsburgh neighborhood) =

- Neighborhood of Pittsburgh
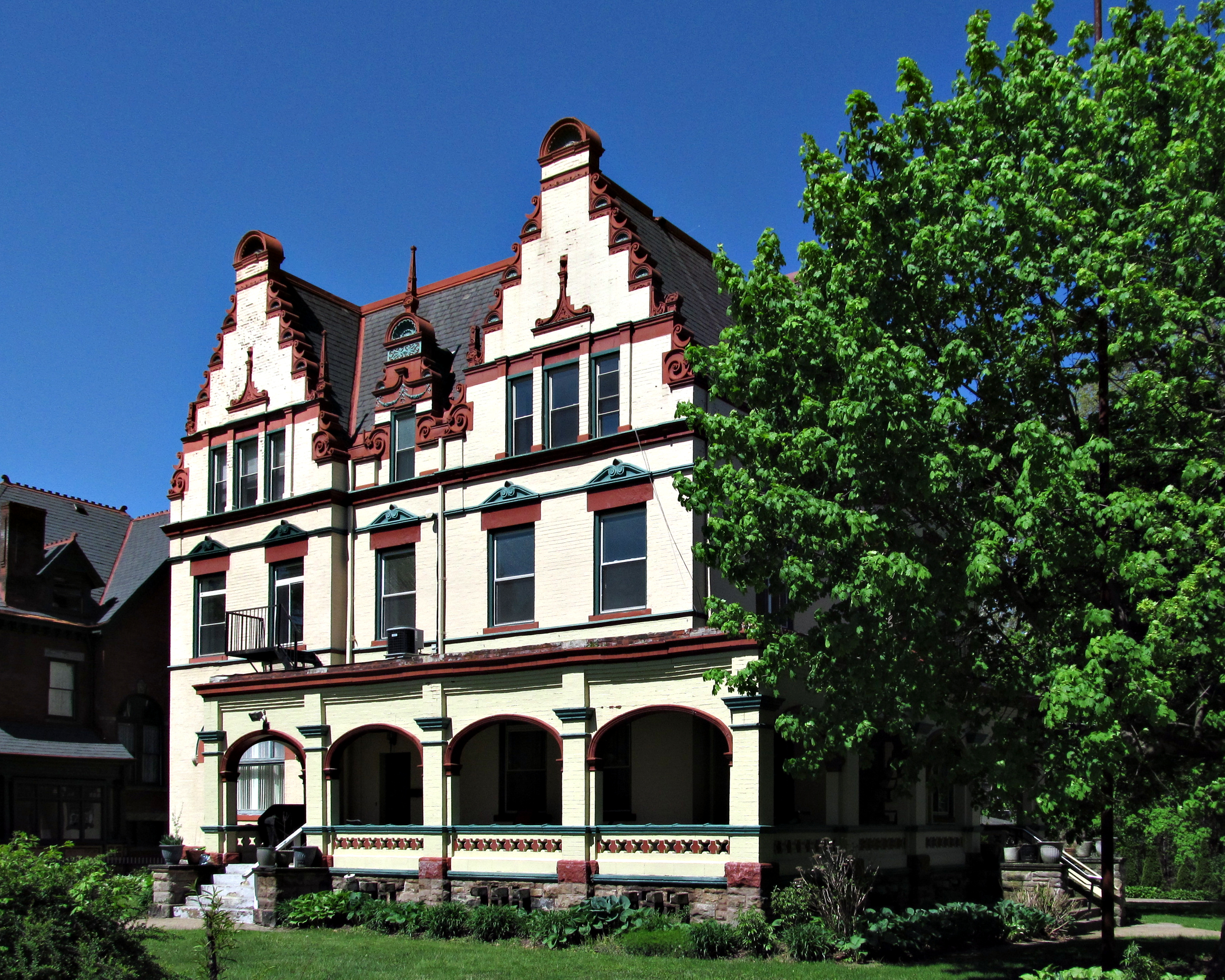
- A house in the Highland Park Residential Historic District.

- Coordinates: 40.478°N 79.916°W
- Country: United States
- State: Pennsylvania
- County: Allegheny County
- City: Pittsburgh

Area
  - Total: 1.163 sq mi (3.01 km^{2})

Population (2010)
  - Total: 6,395
  - Density: 5,499/sq mi (2,123/km^{2})

Highland Park is a neighborhood in the northeastern part of Pittsburgh, Pennsylvania. Highland Park, the neighborhood, fully encompasses the park with the same name.

The neighborhood has 6,395 residents according to the 2010 United States Census. It occupies 748 acres (3.03 km^{2}) built around the 380-acre (1.5 km^{2}) park (also called Highland Park), and is bordered by the neighborhoods of East Liberty and Larimer to the south, Morningside to the west, Lincoln-Lemington-Belmar to the east, and the Allegheny River to the north.

== The Neighborhood ==
The first permanent European settler in Highland Park was Alexander Negley, a Swiss settler. In 1788, Negley purchased a 278-acre farm along the Allegheny River that he called “Fertile Bottom” and which extended over much of what is now Highland Park north of Bryant Street. His son Jacob married Barbara Winebiddle, the daughter of other local landowners, in 1795, and in 1799 purchased the 443-acre farm (called “Heth’s Delight”) that adjoined his father's farm to the south and west. Jacob and Barbara Negley built a brick house at what is now the corner of Stanton and Negley Avenues in 1808, which became the seat of a substantial land holding when the two farms were combined upon the death of Alexander Negley in 1809.

Jacob Negley was one of the most prominent citizens in the early nineteenth century of the East Liberty Valley, the ancient river bottom that lies north of Squirrel Hill in the eastern section of Pittsburgh and provides relief from the generally hilly topography of the city. The earliest highway from the east, the Greensburg & Pittsburgh Turnpike (now Penn Avenue), which followed the line (the Forbes Road) that the British cut during the French and Indian War, ran east–west through the East Liberty Valley. Jacob Negley won the contract to pave a five-mile section of the turnpike between 1813 and 1819. He played a substantial role in the founding of a village in East Liberty, building a steam-powered grist mill on the turnpike in 1816, establishing a bank, and helping to found the East Liberty Presbyterian Church Church in 1819. His daughter Sara Jane married the lawyer Thomas Mellon, patriarch of the banking family, in 1843.

Upon the death of Jacob Negley in 1827, his widow Barbara built a new farmhouse for herself in 1829, which still stands and which gives its name to the "Farmhouse Park" playground within Highland Park. She also resolved certain debts that she and Jacob had incurred during the Panic of 1819 by selling some parcels of her land. In 1837, Barbara Winebiddle Negley divided the remainder of the estate among her children. This started the process of subdivision of land in East Liberty and Highland Park that led to the development of those neighborhoods in the later nineteenth century. With the subdivision of the estate, the County Surveyor, Robert Hilands, also laid out the first streets in the Highland Park area. He formally established Negley Avenue along the line of the country lane that connected Penn Avenue with the Negley homestead, laid out Hiland Avenue (named after himself until changed to “Highland” by the City in 1890) as the principal street running north out of the center of the village of East Liberty, and converted the Negleys’ principal east–west “Country Lane” into what is now called Stanton Avenue.

In the first half of the nineteenth century, most of the development in the East End of Pittsburgh occurred in the East Liberty section. This growth was spurred on by the construction of the Pennsylvania Railroad's main line to Pittsburgh through the East Liberty Valley in 1852. By 1868, there was a population of about 5000 in the general vicinity of East Liberty. In that year, the municipalities east of Pittsburgh (the townships of Pitt, Peebles, Liberty, Collins and Oakland, and the borough of Lawrenceville) were annexed by the City of Pittsburgh as part of a campaign of expansion that tripled the size of the city and extended its boundaries south of the Monongahela River. Further transportation improvements followed the incorporation of East Liberty into the city. In 1870, the City Councils passed the Penn Avenue Act, which provided a mechanism for the paving of local streets, and in 1872 horse-drawn streetcar service was extended out of Pittsburgh to East Liberty. In addition, the city Water Commission purchased land and began construction in 1872 of a reservoir on the top of the hill at the head of Hiland Avenue that opened in 1879. The land purchases for the reservoir later provided the germ of the Highland Park landscape park that was founded in 1889.

The Highland Park neighborhood was developed as a streetcar suburb: residents walked or used streetcars to reach East Liberty, where they worked, shopped, or took trains to other portions of the City of Pittsburgh. As such, the neighborhood was initially almost wholly residential, with homes that are in many cases quite substantial. These homes are spaced further apart than the rowhouses of fully urban neighborhoods such as Bloomfield and Lawrenceville, but they are much closer together than is typical in a post-1940s automobile suburb. The Highland Park neighborhood's appeal derived (and still derives) in large part from its setting between the large public park to the north and the East Liberty business district to the south. That appeal declined to some extent from 1970 to 2000, when East Liberty went through an extended period of decline, but East Liberty's renaissance as a commercial district after 2000 has caused the Highland Park neighborhood to become more appealing as well.

Due in part to the aforementioned decline of East Liberty, the Highland Park neighborhood developed a very small business district of its own on Bryant Street, which presently includes a number of restaurants, a neighborhood grocer, a bakery, a coffee shop, an automobile repair facility, and several other small businesses that are interspersed among private residences on Bryant Street. While no streetcars run through the present-day Highland Park neighborhood, it is served by several bus routes which run south to East Liberty and then beyond, eventually to downtown Pittsburgh.

== Historic District ==
On August 30, 2007, the Highland Park Residential Historic District was officially listed on the National Register of Historic Places. The historic district encompasses the entire neighborhood of Highland Park: its western border consists of Chislett Street (from Stanton Avenue on the south to Hampton Street on the north) and Heth's Run (or more specifically, King Avenue and Cordova Street, which are just to the east of Heth's Run). Its southern and eastern border consists of Stanton Avenue, and its northern border is the Allegheny River. Academy Award-winning actor, Gene Kelly, and acclaimed jazz singer, Billy Eckstine, were both born and raised here.

== City Steps ==
The Highland Park neighborhood has 3 distinct flights of city steps - all of which are open and in a safe condition. In Highland Park, the public stairways in Pittsburgh quickly connect pedestrians to public transportation, Highland Park, and smaller community playgrounds.

== Gallery ==
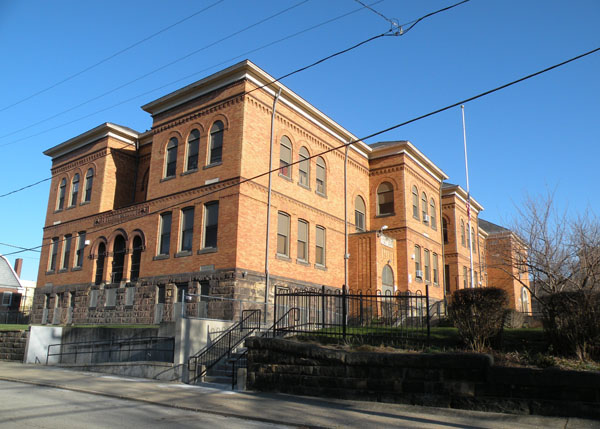
Fulton Elementary School, built in 1894, at 5799 Hampton Street

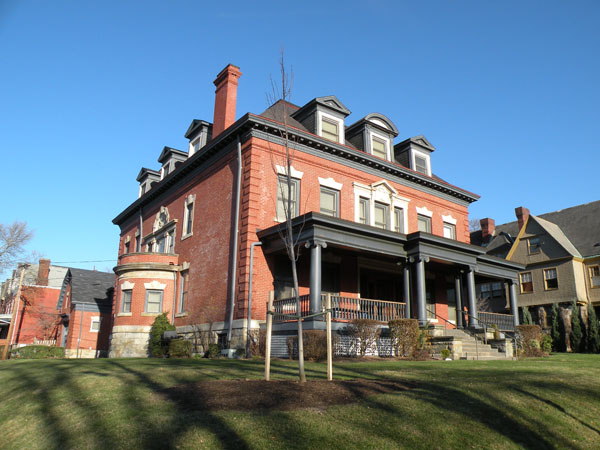
James Scott House (also known as Altholl), built in 1900, at 5635 Stanton Avenue

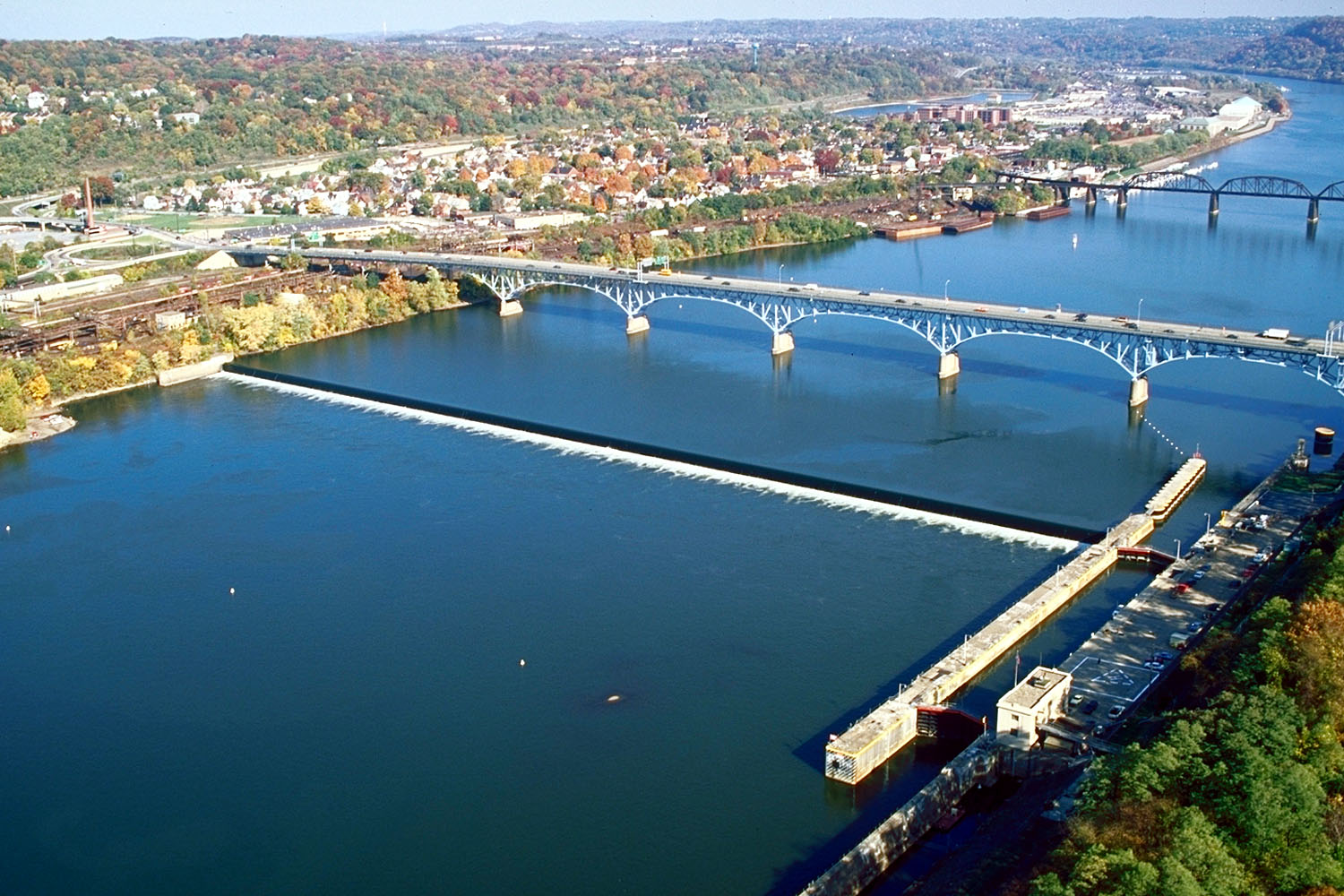
Allegheny River Lock and Dam No. 2, built circa 1930s, near Highland Park Bridge

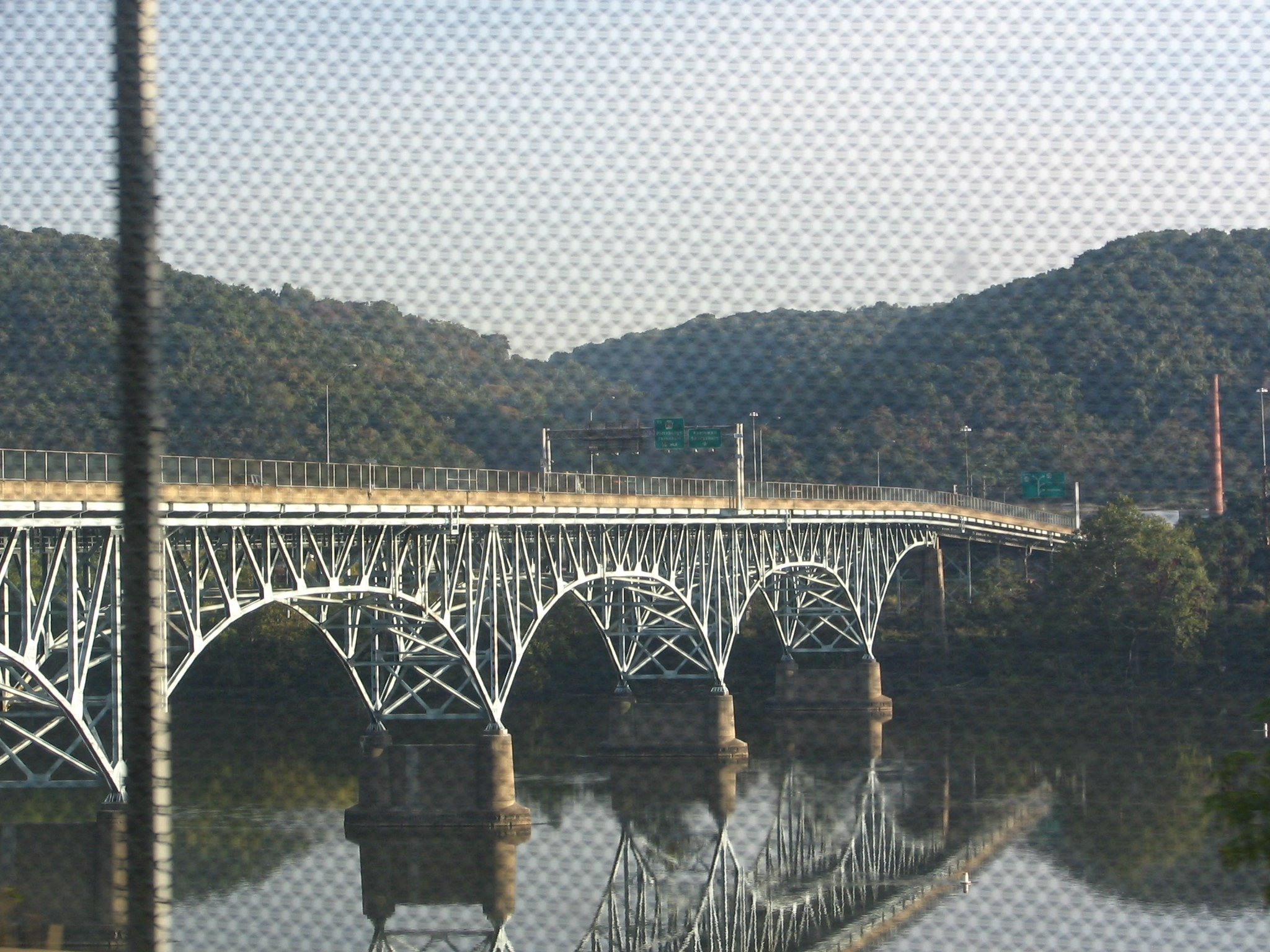
Highland Park Bridge, opened in 1938

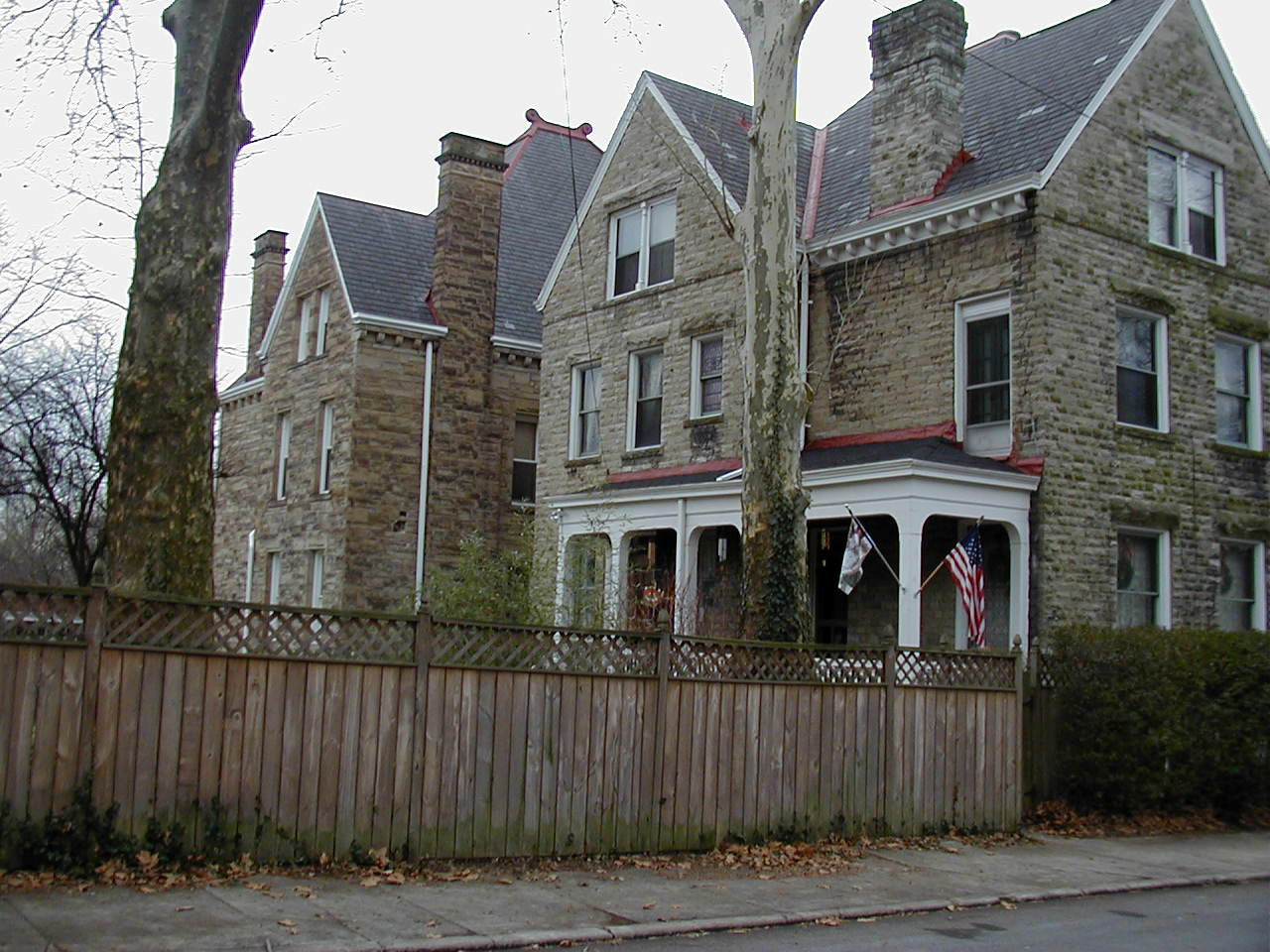
View of a residential street in the Highland Park neighborhood

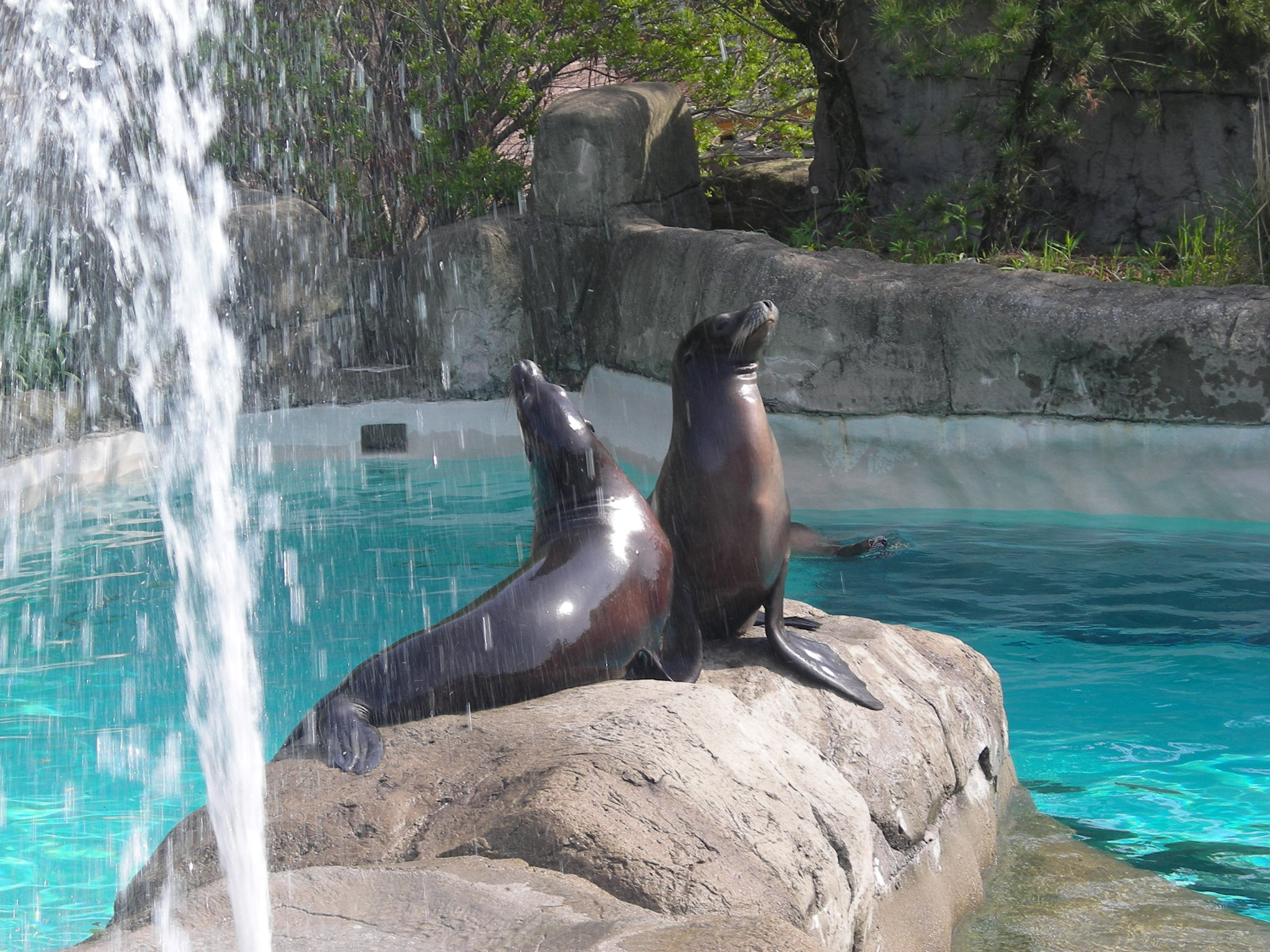
The sea lion exhibit in the Kids Kingdom section of the Pittsburgh Zoo

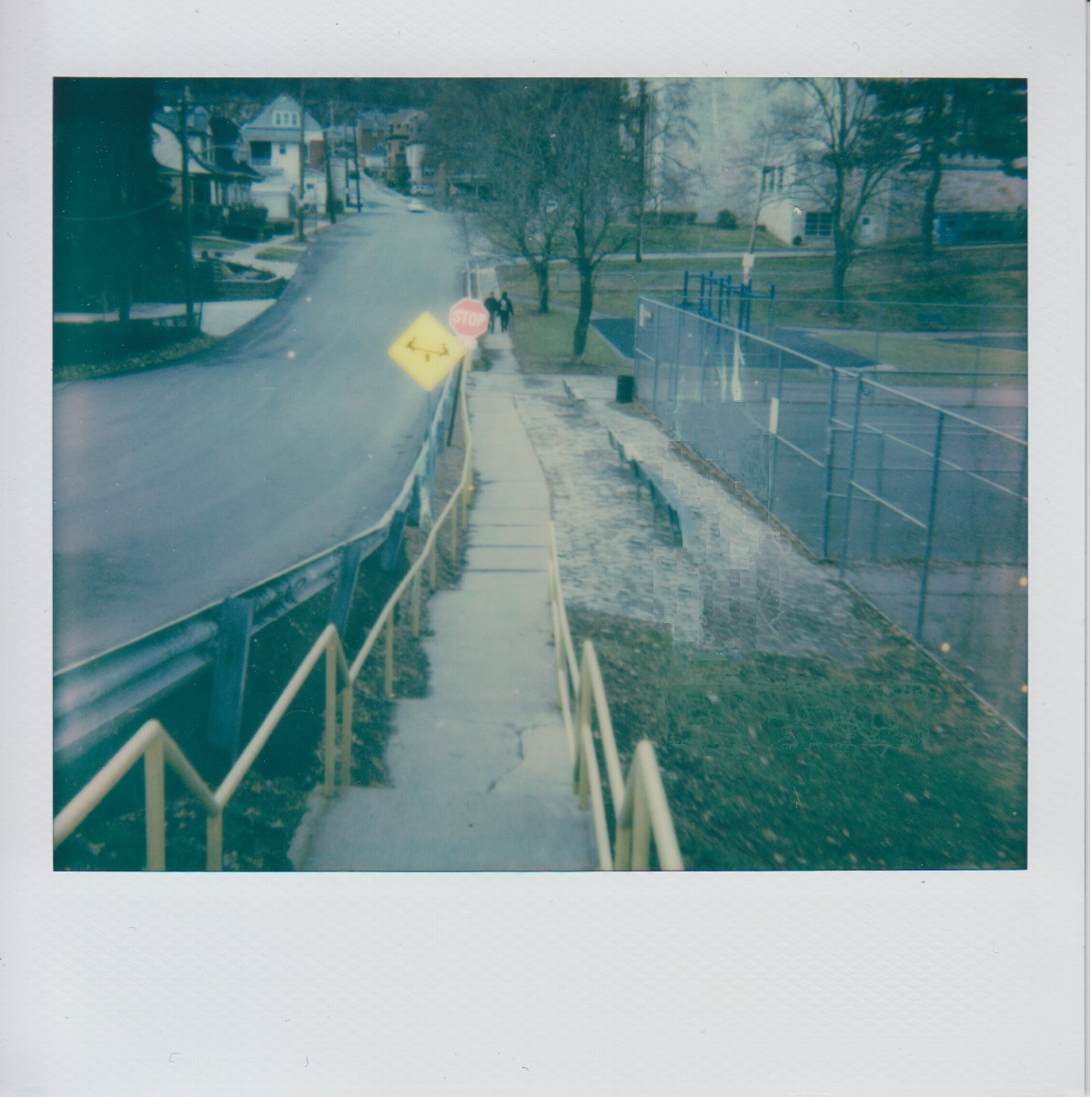
City steps to the Heths Street playground in Highland Park

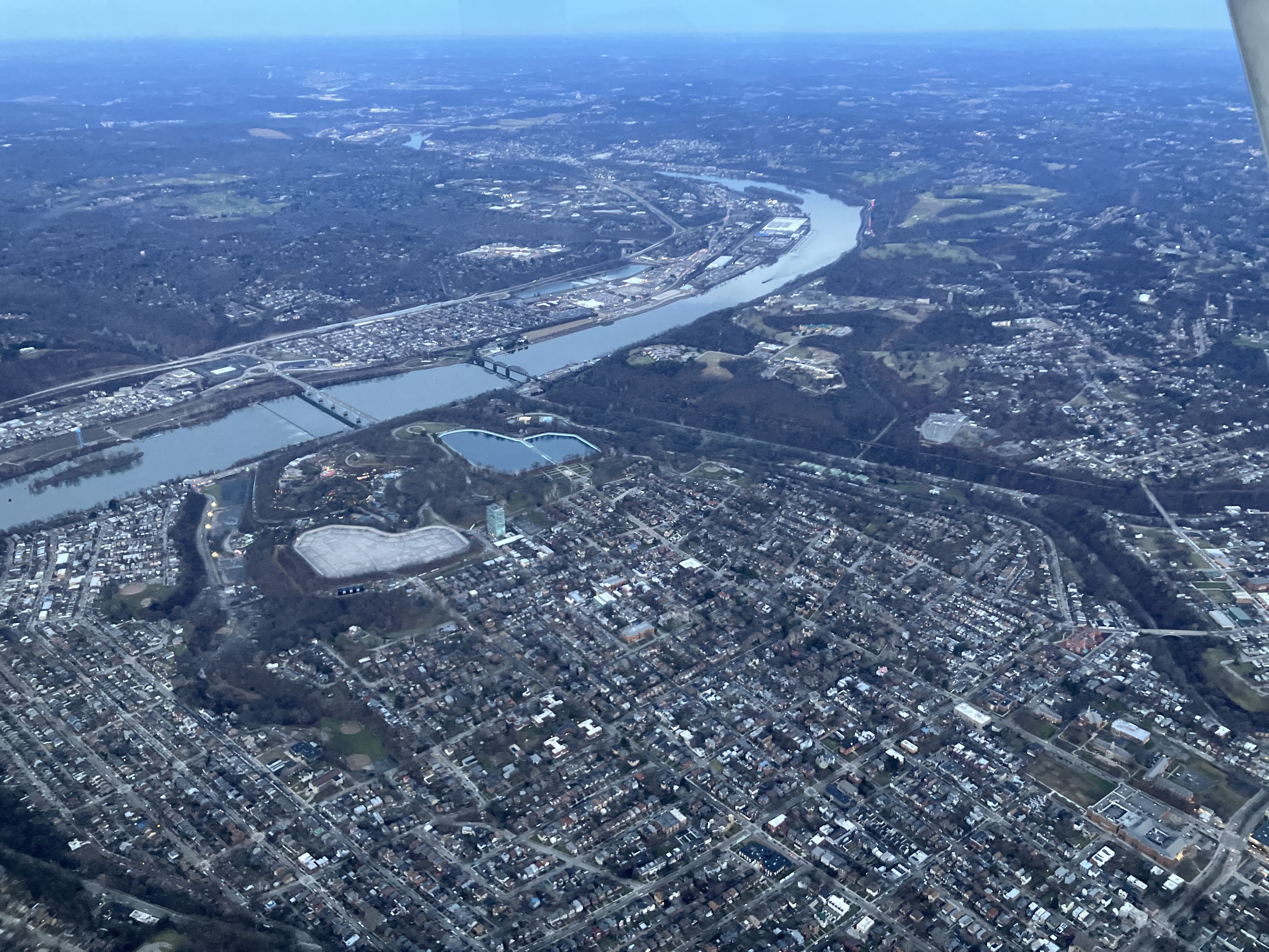
Aerial view

== See also ==
- Highland Park, the park the neighborhood is named for
- List of Pittsburgh neighborhoods
