= Kaufmann's Department Store Warehouse =

- U.S. National Register of Historic Places
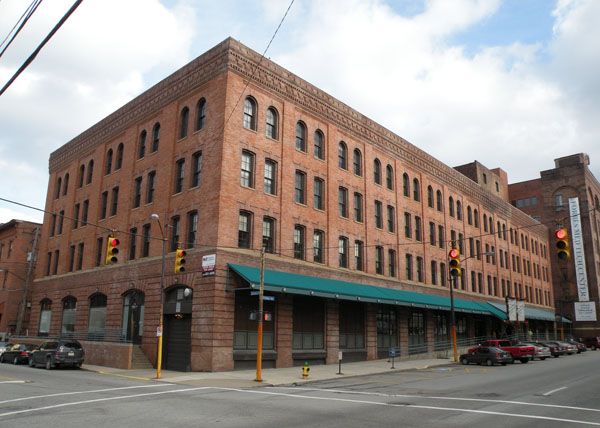

- Location within Pittsburgh Location within Pennsylvania Location within the United States
- Location: 1401 Forbes Ave., Pittsburgh, Pennsylvania
- Coordinates: 40°26′17″N 79°59′12″W
- Area: less than one acre
- Built: 1901
- Architect: Crisman, D.H.
- Architectural style: Renaissance Revival
- NRHP reference No.: 97000513
- Added to NRHP: May 30, 1997

The Kaufmann's Department Store Warehouse (also known as the Forbes Stevenson Building, or Forbes Med-Tech Center) located in the Bluff neighborhood of Pittsburgh, Pennsylvania, is a building from 1901. It was listed on the National Register of Historic Places in 1997.

== See also ==
- Reymer Brothers Candy Factory at 1425 Forbes Ave.
