= Z-Best BBQ =

- Interactive map of Z-Best BBQ

Restaurant information
- Established: 2010
- Owner: Darwin Copeland (as of 2017)
- Location: 2900 Bedford Ave; 1317 Fifth Avenue (2010-2020), Pittsburgh, Allegheny, Pennsylvania, 15219, United States
- Coordinates: 40.45257°N 79.96724°W

Z-Best BBQ is a barbecue restaurant that was previously located on Fifth Avenue in Pittsburgh, Pennsylvania and now currently operates out of the basement of the former St Richard's church on Bedford Avenue.

== History ==
Z-Best BBQ was opened for business in 2010 on Fifth Avenue in Uptown Pittsburgh and operated there until a 2020 fire forced them to relocate to the basement of the former St Richard's church on Bedford Avenue. In July 2021, it was reported that Z-best BBQ was awarded $11,475 in federal relief funds due to complications from the COVID-19 pandemic in Pennsylvania.

== Cuisine ==
Z-best BBQ serves traditional American barbecue dishes such as slow-cooked chicken, pork and beef ribs as well as sides such as mashed potatoes and mac and cheese.

== Reception ==
Eater placed Z-best BBQ at number 16 on their list of the 38 best restaurants in Pittsburgh.
