= Charles Bickel =

American architect

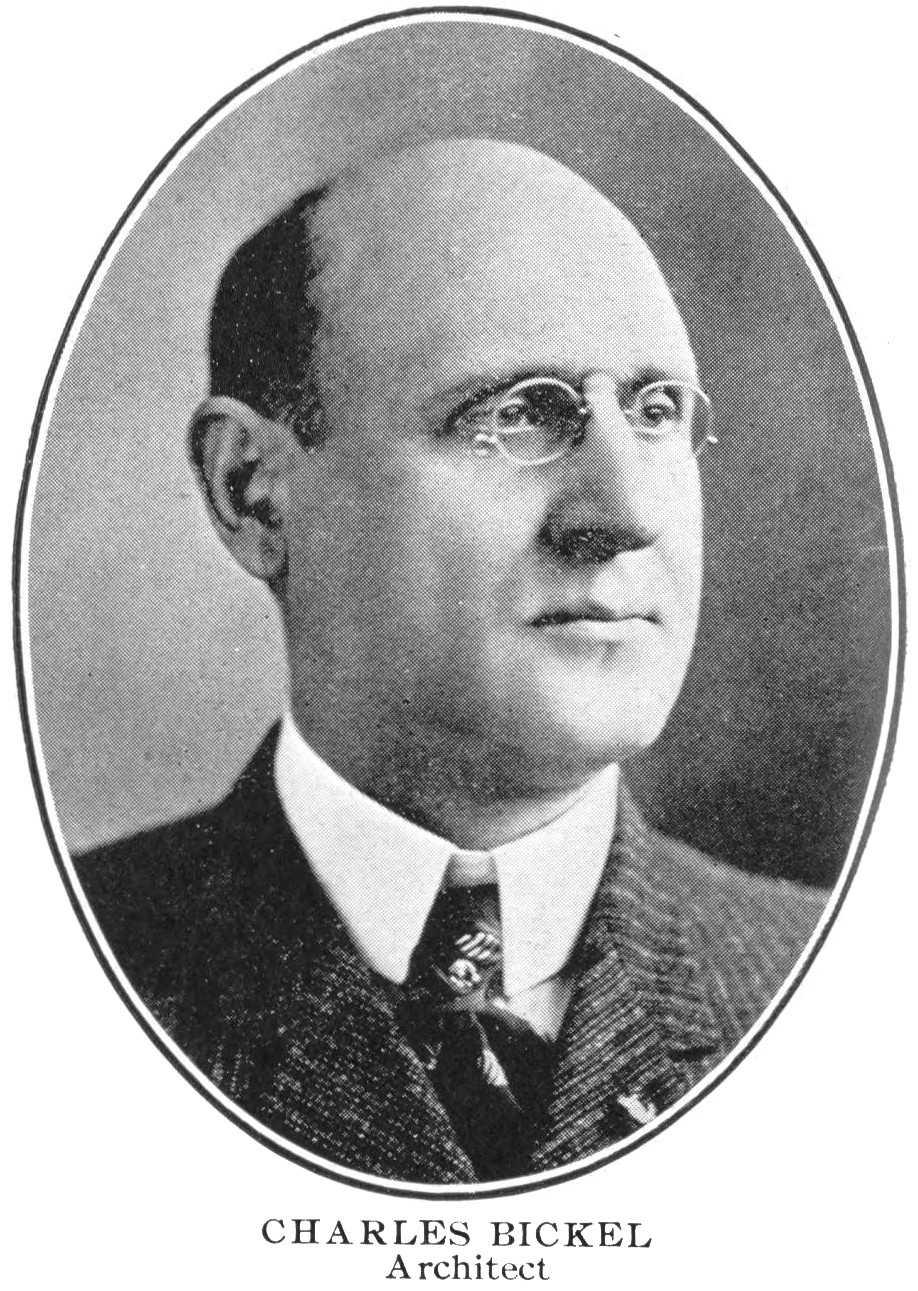
Portrait of architect Charles Bickel published in 1905

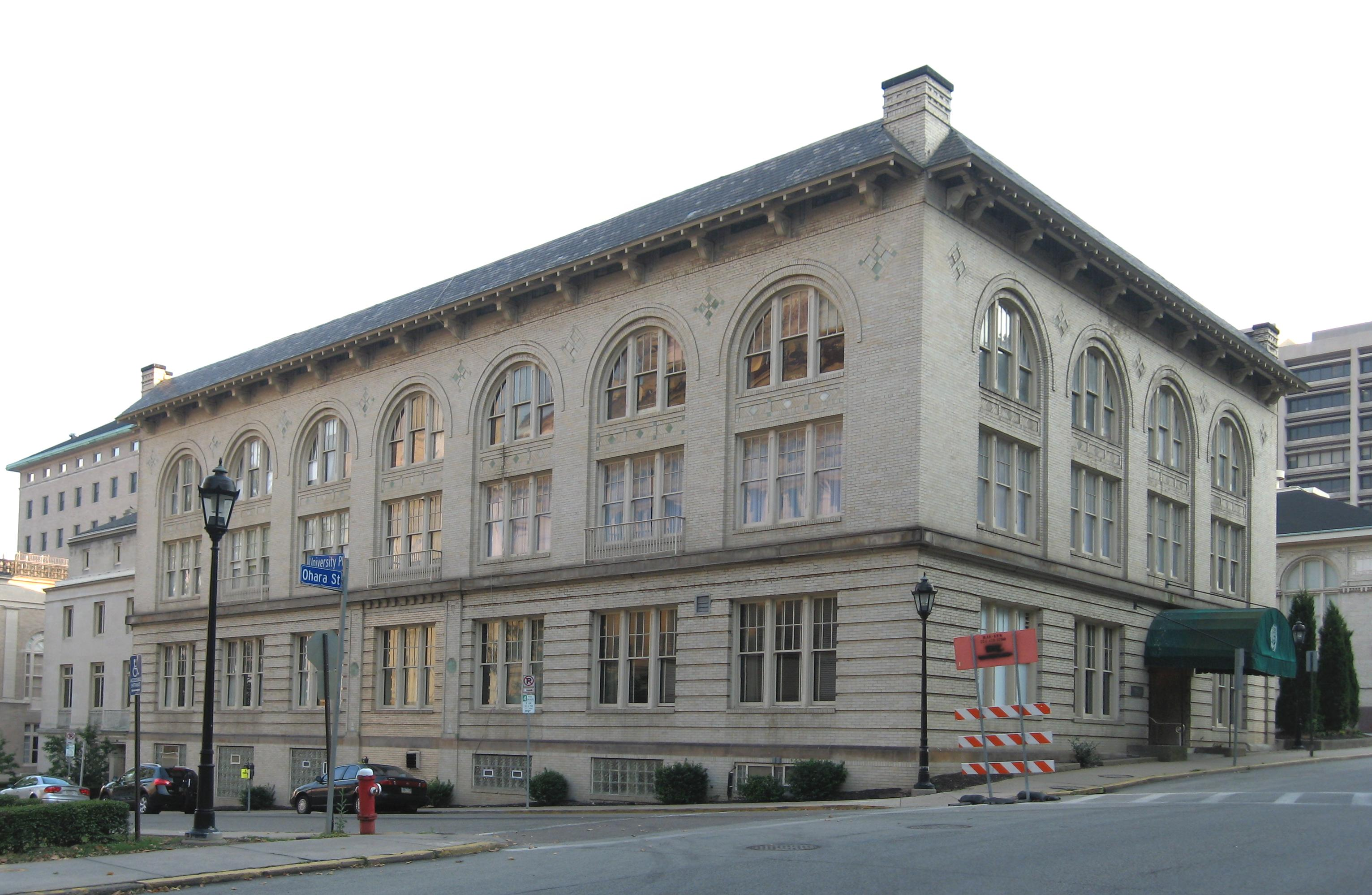
The O'Hara Student Center, formerly the Concordia Club (1913), in the Oakland neighborhood of Pittsburgh, Pennsylvania

Charles A. Bickel (1852 – 1 February 1921) was a prominent architect practicing in Pittsburgh, Pennsylvania.

Bickel was born to a well-to-do family of Columbus, Ohio who sent him to Europe for six years to prepare him for a career in architecture. On his return in 1875, he settled in Pittsburgh, apprenticed with an architect there. In 1885 he opened his independent practice, at first in partnership with J.P. Brennan, a partnership that was soon dissolved. Bickel's practice at its height averaged $3,000,000 a year in billings and was concentrated in commercial structures. He served for a time as architect to the city of Pittsburgh, and designed and built numerous police precinct houses and the Public Safety offices.

Failing health forced him to retire in 1920, and he turned his practice over to his son.

== Selected commissions ==
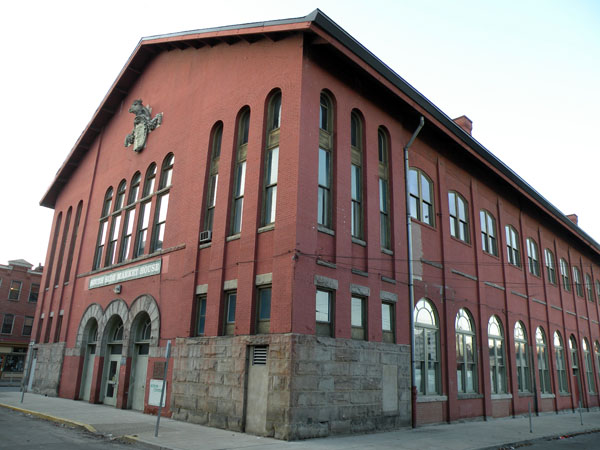
South Side Market Building (1915) in the South Side Flats neighborhood of Pittsburgh

Many of Bickel's commercial structure were of fireproof construction.

- Logan-Gregg Hardware Company building, eight storeys.
- Spear & Company, ten storeys
- May Building, twelve storeys
- German National Bank, 313 Sixth Avenue, downtown Pittsburgh, eight storeys, 1890
- Columbia National Bank, ten storeys
- Methodist Book Concern building, eight storeys
- United Presbyterian Book building, eleven storeys
- H. and I Kaufman and I. Kaufman stores, ten and twelve storeys, 1898
- Hartje Building, twelve storeys, and three Hartje storeys
- B. White Building, eight storeys
- Atlantic Financial Building, 1889
- Pittsburgh Terminal Warehouse and Transfer Company, 1906
- Haines Building, ten storeys
- McKay Building, eight storeys
- Olympia Theatre
- Reymer Brothers Candy Factory at 1425 Forbes Avenue in the Bluff neighborhood of Pittsburgh, 1910
- Concordia Club, 1913
- Second Presbyterian church, Eighth Street
- South Side Market Building at 12th and Bingham Streets in the South Side Flats neighborhood of Pittsburgh, 1915
- Frank & Seder Building 1918
- Methodist Episcopal Church, Lincoln Avenue
- German Savings and Trust Company
- Duquesne National Bank
- National Ben Franklin Fire Insurance Company Building
- Westmoreland Club, in Verona, Pennsylvania
- N. Nathan & Brothers Building, Johnstown, Pennsylvania
- Number 7 Police Station, 93 S. 13th and 1305 Sarah St

== Gallery ==
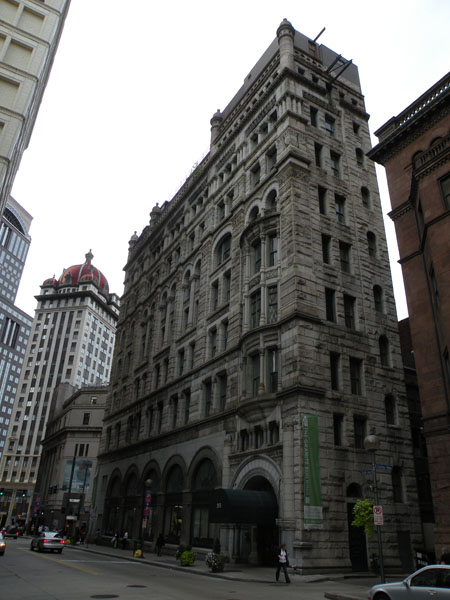
Granite Building (former German National Bank) (1890), in Downtown Pittsburgh. Architects Bickel & Brennan.

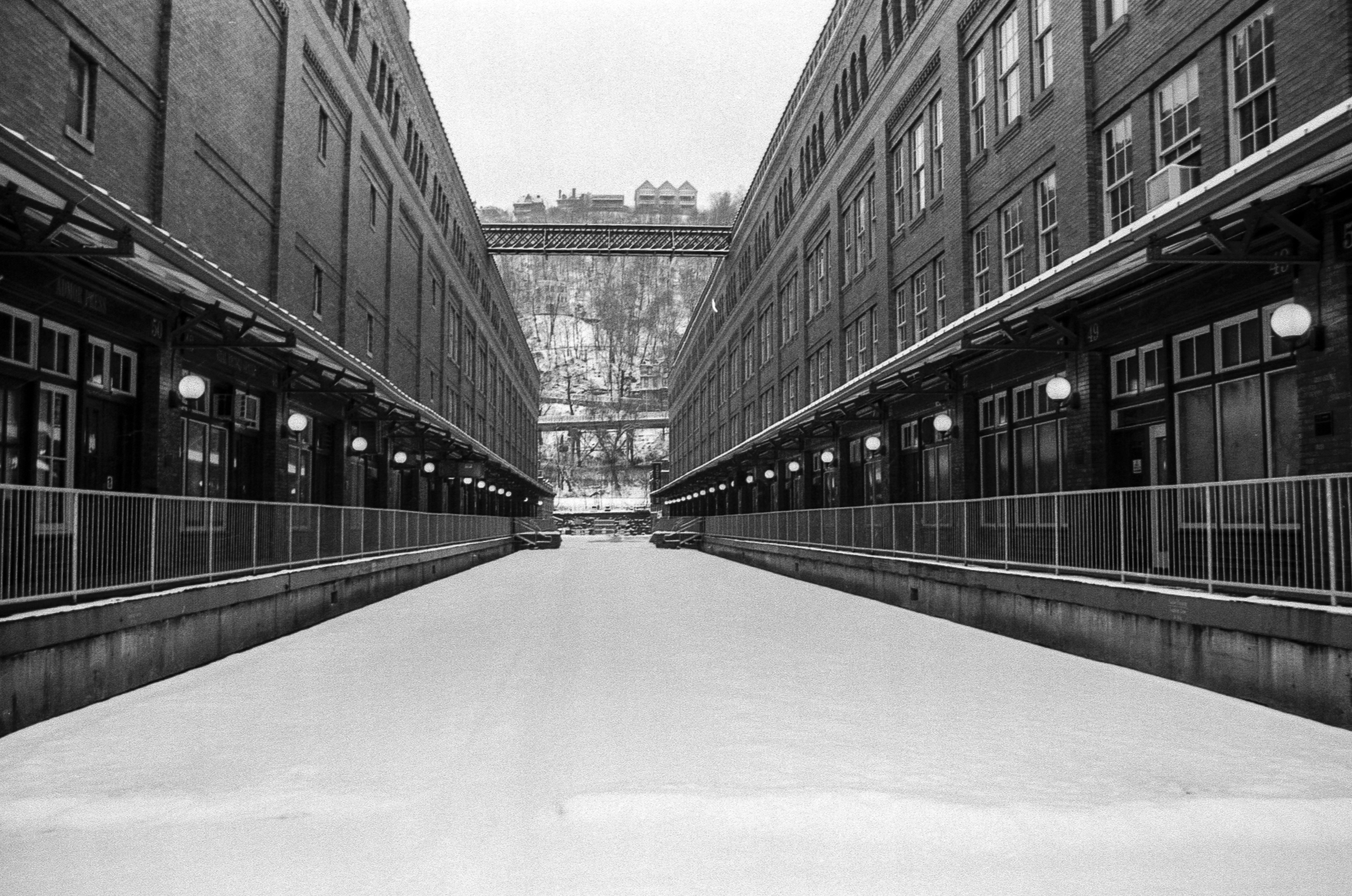
Pittsburgh Terminal Warehouse and Transfer Company (1906), in the South Side Flats neighborhood of Pittsburgh

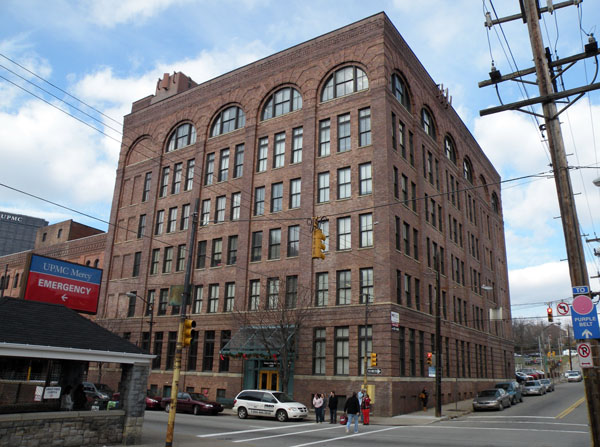
Reymer Brothers Candy Factory (1910), in the Bluff neighborhood of Pittsburgh
