= Pittsburgh Terminal Properties =

- Pittsburgh Terminal Warehouse and Transfer Company
- U.S. National Register of Historic Places
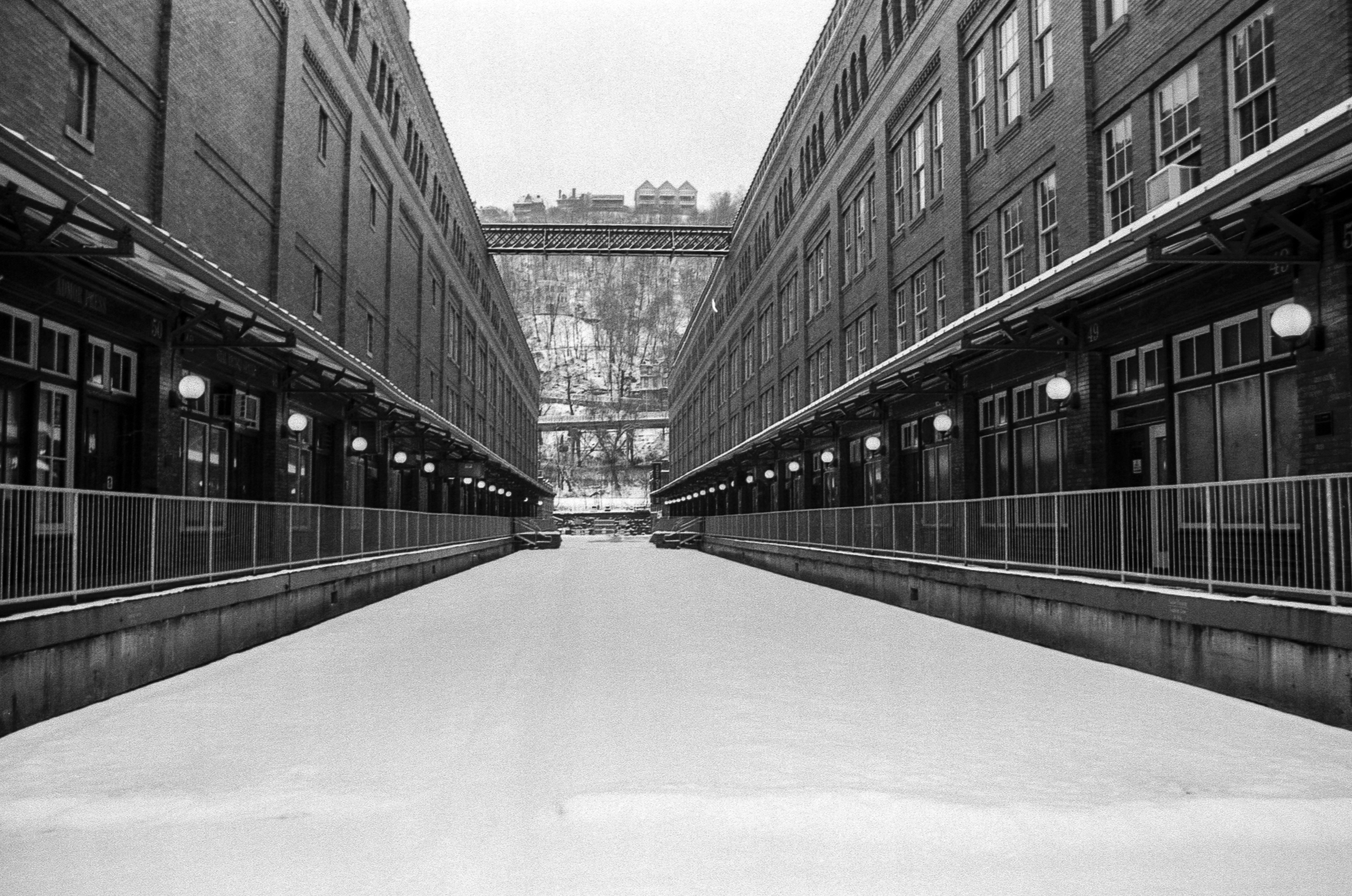

- Location within Pittsburgh Location within Pennsylvania Location within the United States
- Location: 333–400 East Carson Street, Pittsburgh, Pennsylvania
- Coordinates: 40°25′47.3″N 79°59′49.39″W
- Built: 1904 to 1906
- Architect: Charles Bickel
- NRHP reference No.: 13000253
- Added to NRHP: May 8, 2013

The Pittsburgh Terminal Properties building is an historic structure on Pittsburgh’s South Side, across the river from Downtown. The building was the Pittsburgh Terminal Warehouse and Transfer Company, located in the South Side Flats neighborhood of Pittsburgh, Pennsylvania, United States. This warehouse complex was designed by Charles Bickel and was designed in 1898, and built from 1904 to 1906. The structure was listed in the National Register of Historic Places on May 8, 2013.

== History ==
The facility was conceived as a central point of connection between road, river, and rail transport. The River and Railroad Terminal Company was incorporated on February 8, 1898 to begin the project. Major changes needed to be made to the planned area for the buildings, requiring new city ordinances. Ordinances to change the streets and clear area for building were approved on November 6, 1903. An additional ordinance was required to create the bridge over Cabot Way that holds the road (Terminal Way) which runs between the two major buildings.

Contractual agreements were created with the railroads servicing the area in early 1904. They show the intended use and how interconnection with the railroad lines would work and which parties were responsible for the various costs. Construction of the buildings began on July 1, 1904, and was finally completed on May 31, 1906. The total cost of construction was approximately $1.5 million.

The building was a prominent piece of early 1900s Pittsburgh architecture. It was the subject of different art works and was featured on post cards. One of the new tenants of the building, City Center Self Storage, has a collection of these historical postcards on display in their office.

During World War II, the 6th floor of the building was used to store ammunition and ordinance for the United States Department of War.

The facility was in active use for warehouse and transportation until 1963. Marketing brochures from that time promote 868,000 square feet of office and warehouse space available and the availability of a teletype center.

In 2006, the building was renamed River Walk Corporate Centre. Upper floors of the West Building have largely been converted into modern office space. Tenants include the Green Building Alliance, and Venture Outdoors. East Building tenants include City Center Self Storage, ProFromGo Internet Marketing, and Harry Giglio Photography.

On February 5, 2013, Pennsylvania's Historic Preservation Board unanimously approved Pittsburgh Terminal Properties application for historic status in a listing on the National Register of Historic Places.

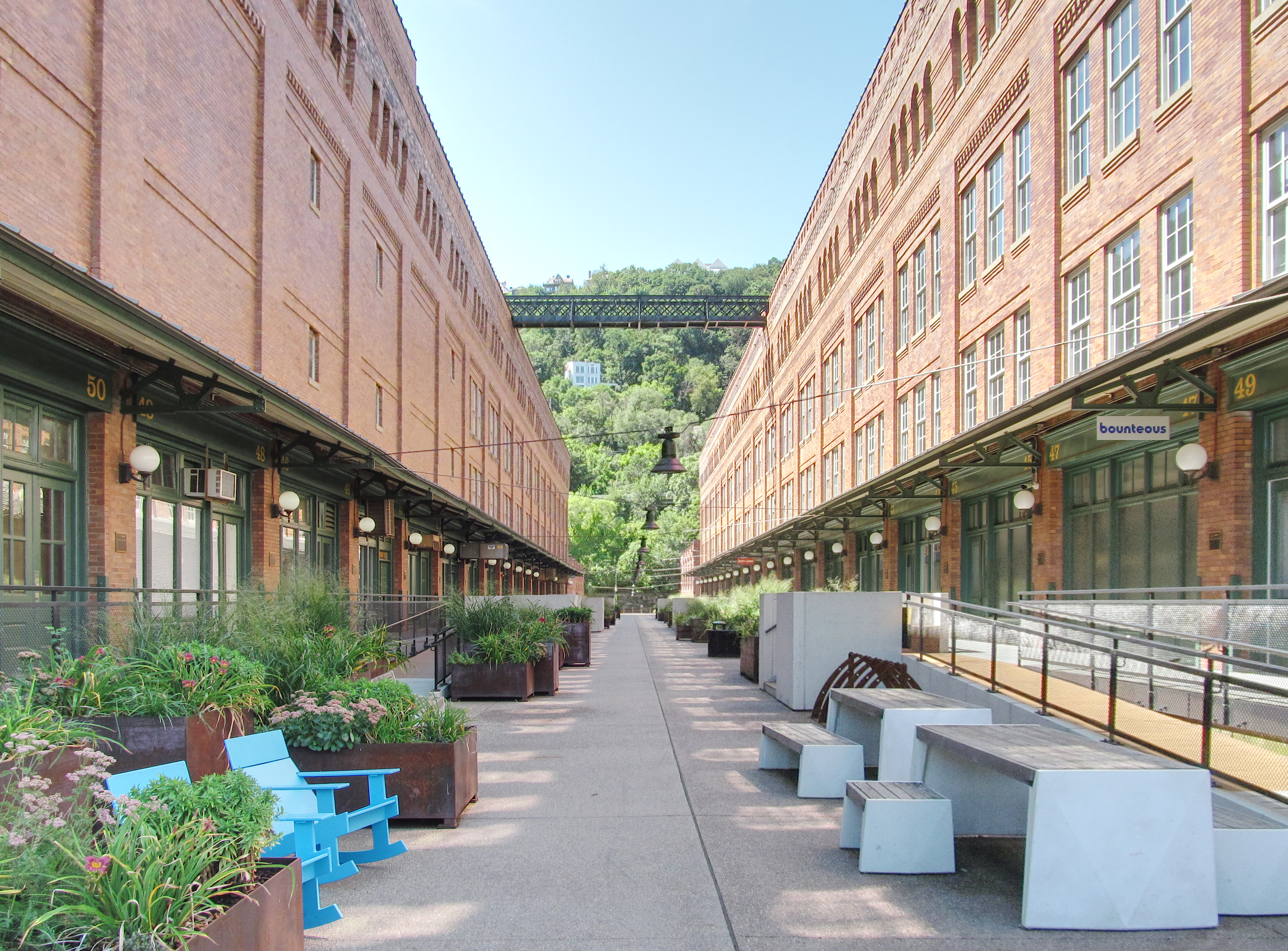
“The Highline”: Terminal Way in 2023, closed to vehicular traffic

In 2016, the buildings were bought by McKnight Realty Partners, and is currently being converted into The Highline, a creative and chic office complex with retail on the first floor. It will also include a 521 space parking garage, bike storage, a public fitness center, and green space, which can be used for events.
