= South Side Market Building =

- U.S. National Register of Historic Places
- City of Pittsburgh Historic Structure
- Pittsburgh Landmark – PHLF
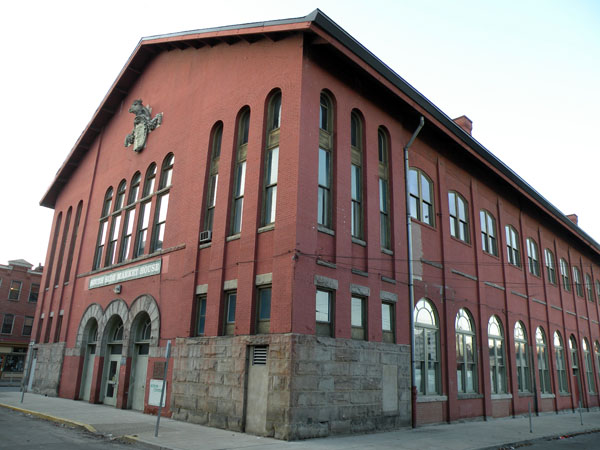

- Location within Pittsburgh Location within Pennsylvania Location within the United States
- Location: 12th and Bingham Sts., Pittsburgh, Pennsylvania
- Coordinates: 40°25′45.64″N 79°59′11.17″W
- Area: 1 acre (0.40 ha)
- Built: 1915
- Architectural style: Richardsonian Romanesque, Romanesque, Italianate
- NRHP reference No.: 76001600

Significant dates
- Added to NRHP: October 14, 1976
- Designated CPHS: February 22, 1977
- Designated PHLF: 1968

The South Side Market Building, also known as the South Side Market House, is a historic, American market house that is located at 12th and Bingham Streets in the South Side Flats neighborhood of Pittsburgh, Pennsylvania.

Built in 1915, it was added to the National Register of Historic Places in 1976.

== History and architectural features ==
The original market house on this spot was built in 1893, but was destroyed by fire circa 1914. It was rebuilt in 1915. Architect: Charles Bickel.

According to James D. Van Trump and Arthur P. Ziegler, Jr., "It is one of the last two market houses extant in Pittsburgh; the other is the East Liberty Market.

According to Walter C. Kidney, "When it was rebuilt in 1915 after a fire, the towers came off, the gable roof was brought down to the eaves on both fronts, and a well-scaled stone cartouche was set into the south front memorializing the new work. This cartouche is the building's one decoration today, set off by swags and surmounted by a bull's head. The Romanesque walls otherwise survive largely as built, industrial rather than civic architecture."
