= O'Hara Student Center =

- U.S. Historic district – Contributing property
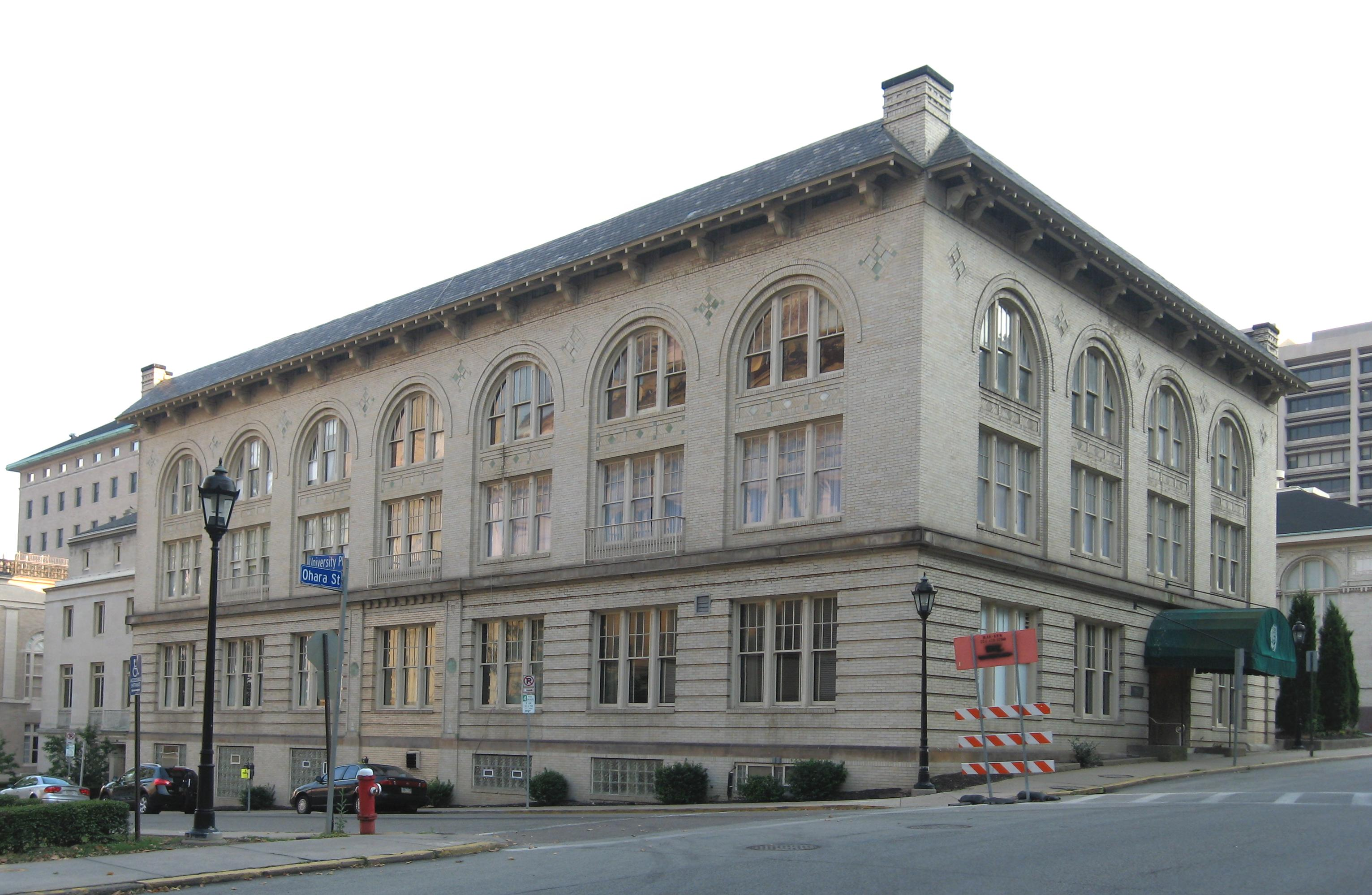
- The O'Hara Student Center at the University of Pittsburgh
- Coordinates: 40°26′41.29″N 79°57′26.01″W
- Built: 1913
- Architect: Charles Bickel
- Architectural style: Romanesque Revival
- Part of: Schenley Farms Historic District (ID83002213)
- Added to NRHP: July 22, 1983

The O'Hara Student Center, formerly the Concordia Club, is a three-story, 18,000-square-foot (1,700 m^{2}) building on the campus of the University of Pittsburgh on O'Hara Street in the Oakland neighborhood of Pittsburgh, Pennsylvania. It is a contributing property to the Schenley Farms National Historic District and the City of Pittsburgh Oakland Civic Center Historic District. The building was acquired by the university in mid-December, 2009. and has since been renovated to house academic and student activity programs.

== History ==
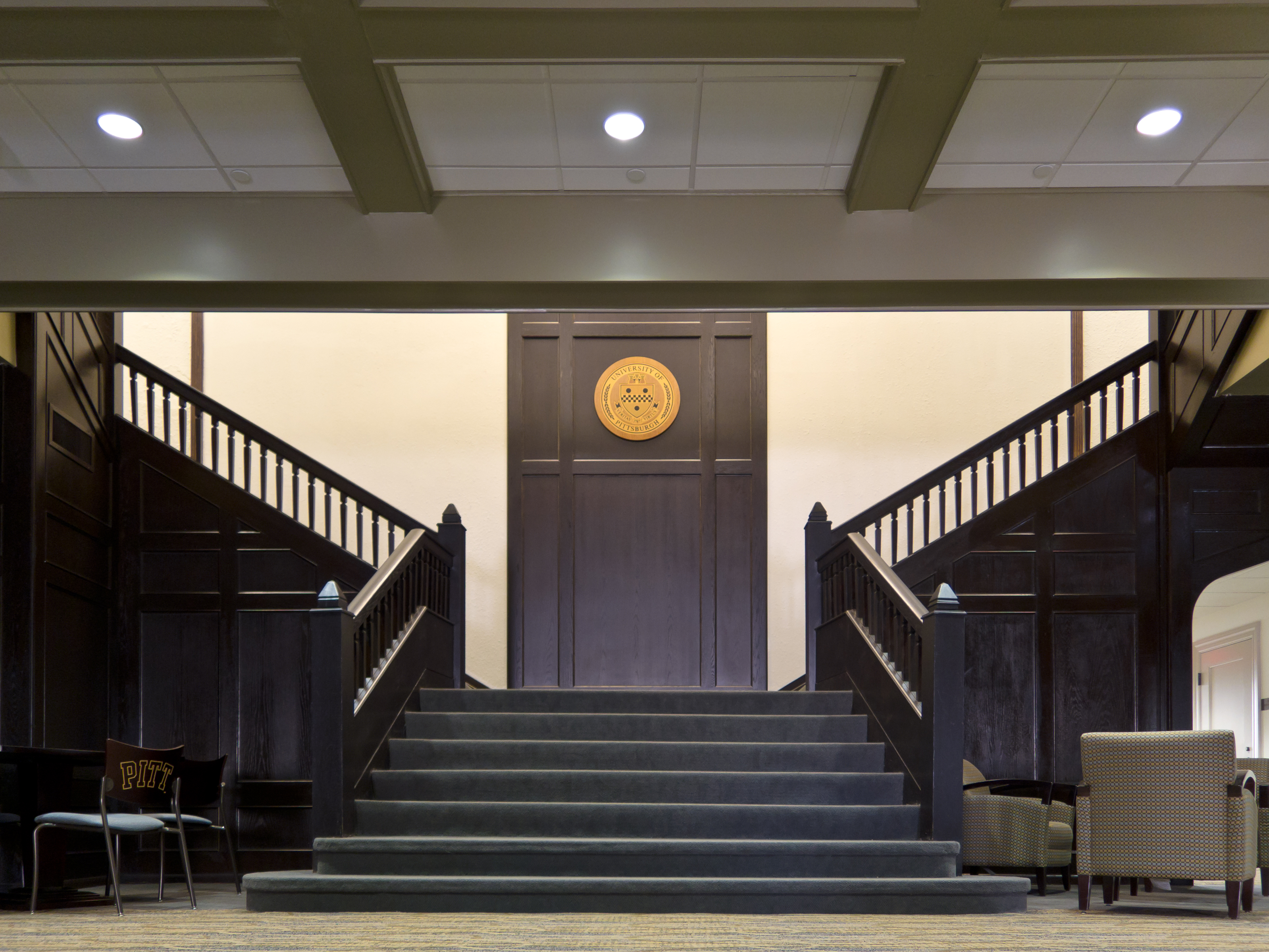
The staircase on the renovated first floor

On January 21, 1874, a group of prominent German Jews, mostly members of the Rodef Shalom Congregation, met for the purpose of organizing a private club in Pittsburgh, "to promote social and literary entertainment among its members." The small group establishing the Jewish social club voted to host it at a private residence on Pittsburgh's North Side and voted Judge Josiah Cohen to be its first president. The popularity of the Club called for a move to larger quarters on Stockton Street on the North Side. It was at this location that a conference of eighteen rabbis met at the Club in November 1885 to sign the defining document of American Reform Judaism termed the Pittsburgh Platform. The creation of this document is commemorated by a historical marker placed by the state of Pennsylvania near the location of the Club at the time. The club's growing acceptance encouraged a second move to the present quarters in Oakland, designed by a leading Pittsburgh architect, Charles Bickel. Characterized by the press as "a handsome facility," the new quarters opened formally on December 25, 1913.

The membership rolls of the club over the years included Pittsburgh Pirates owner Barney Dreyfuss, industrialist Leon Falk Jr., and department store magnate Edgar J. Kaufmann. Eventually, the club began including eastern European Jews, and in more recent years membership was open without regard to gender, race, ethnicity or religion.

When Concordia moved into its building on O'Hara Street in 1913, it was described as one of city's most opulent with notably elegant china, crystal and linens along with profuse flower arrangements. A 1915 article in the Jewish Criterion commented that the new club was "entirely complete with billiard rooms, banquet hall, rest and lounging parlors, reading quarters and sleeping accommodations." Later the club would add to its interior by installing elaborate dark-stained oak paneling rescued from the lower level and bar of the 1905 constructed Fort Pitt Hotel at 10th Street and Penn Avenue, Downtown when it was demolished in 1967.

At its peak the club had nearly 300 members, but in the face of declining membership and a shortage of cash, club members voted July 16, 2009 to approve the sale of their historic building to the University of Pittsburgh who will pay $2.1 million for the structure. The club continued its normal activities until the sale closed on December 14, 2009.

== Restoration and use ==
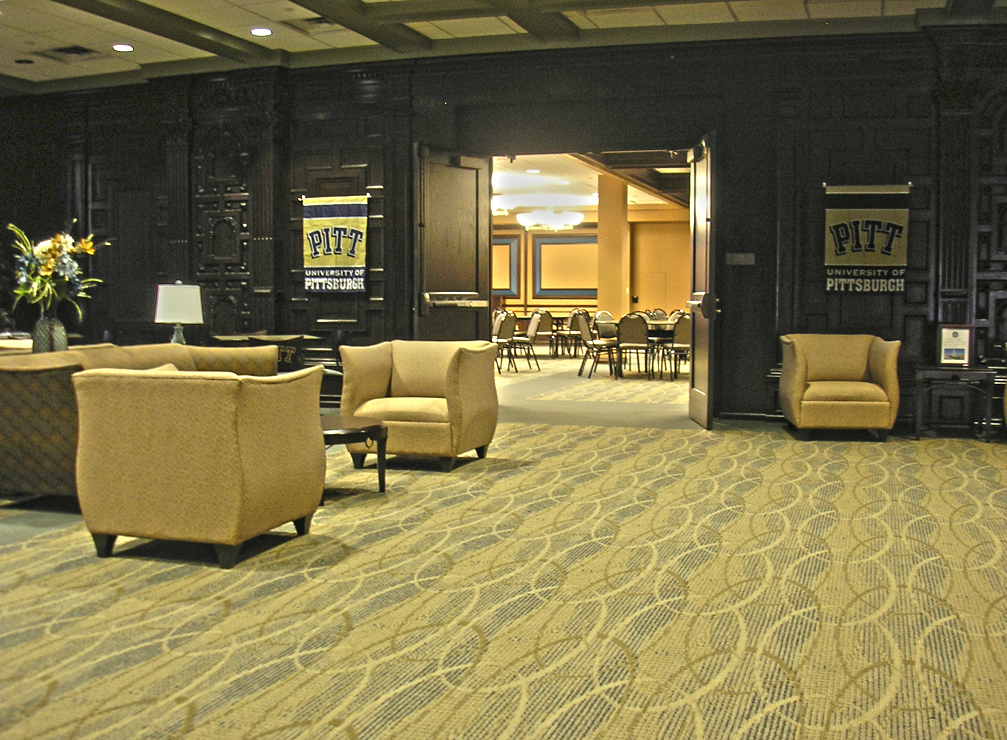
Oak paneled studying and meeting space

The University of Pittsburgh undertook $5.8 million in upgrades, preservation, and renovations that were completed in April, 2011 and provided almost 35,000 square feet (3,300 m^{2}) of space in order to help alleviate shortages in student group event, meeting, and office space at the William Pitt Union. Upgrades included tearing out walls, updating the heating and cooling systems, replacing the roof, and upgrading the lighting. The first floor contains the oak paneled space for studying or socializing as well as a dining room that can double as a meeting room. A staircase, with original wood railings, leads to a second floor contains a 450-person capacity, sound system-equipped ball room that includes an open balcony, arched windows, and a small stage. From a previous renovation more than 50 years ago, the ballroom contains three chandeliers, one larger than the others, and a number of sconces. Renovations to the ball room included restoring access to the balcony, applying gold leaf trim to the wall panels, and a restoration of the chandeliers, including replacement of the light bulbs with LEDs, by the original lighting fabricator located in Pittsburgh's Strip District. The basement of the Student Center is used as a storage area for student groups. The facility also houses the Math Assistance Center, the Freshman Studies Program, and the student Writing Center.

== In popular culture ==
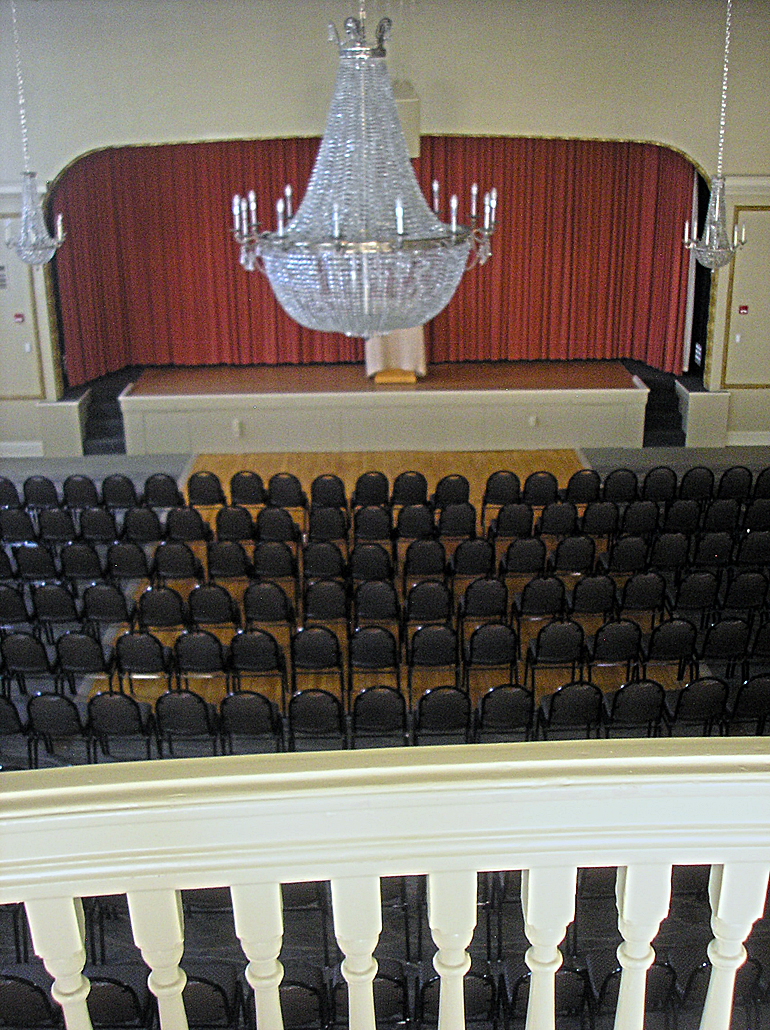
The ball room as viewed from the balcony

- The Concordia Club was used for location shoot in the movie Sorority Row (2009).

Preceded by Gardner Steel Conference Center	University of Pittsburgh buildings O'Hara Student Center; Constructed: 1913	Succeeded by Allen Hall
