= Reymer Brothers Candy Factory =

- U.S. National Register of Historic Places
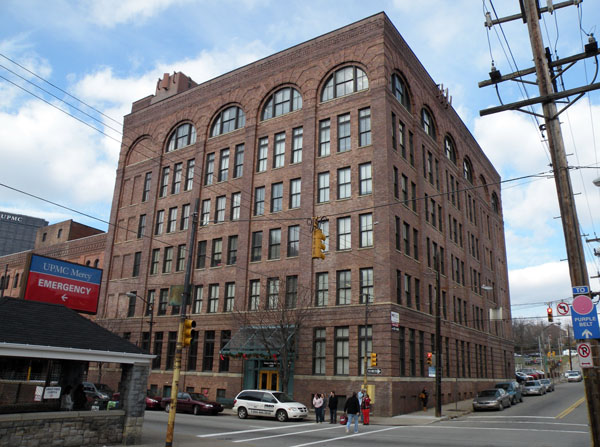

- Location within Pittsburgh Location within Pennsylvania Location within the United States
- Location: 1425 Forbes Ave., Pittsburgh, Pennsylvania
- Coordinates: 40°26′16″N 79°59′8″W
- Area: less than one acre
- Built: 1906
- Architect: Charles Bickel
- Architectural style: Romanesque
- NRHP reference No.: 97000514
- Added to NRHP: May 30, 1997

The Reymer Brothers Candy Factory (also known as the Forbes Pride Building, or Forbes Med-Tech Center) is located in the Bluff neighborhood of Pittsburgh, Pennsylvania. Built in 1906, it was designed in the Richardsonian Romanesque style.

The building was listed on the National Register of Historic Places in 1997.

== History and architectural features ==
Reymer and Anderson was one of the first confectionaries in Pittsburgh; it boomed during the American Civil War when people sent candy to soldiers, and prospered during the last half of the nineteenth century as Phillip Reymer's sons, Jacob and Harmer, took over the business.

By 1906, when the new factory was built, the Reymer family had left the business but their name lived on. In 1908, the firm claimed that it was "one of the largest confectionery houses in the world," and that it had 5,000 vendors in the Pittsburgh area.

The firm ran five teahouses in Pittsburgh, which may have contributed to a perception that the firm made quality products but was unprofitable. An uncarbonated soft drink, "Lemon Blennd," accounted for seventy percent of its sales in 1959. The company was taken over in 1959 by a competitor, Dimling's, which went out of business in 1969.

The building was listed on the National Register of Historic Places in 1997.
