= Uptown Pittsburgh =

Uptown Bluff
- Neighborhood of Pittsburgh
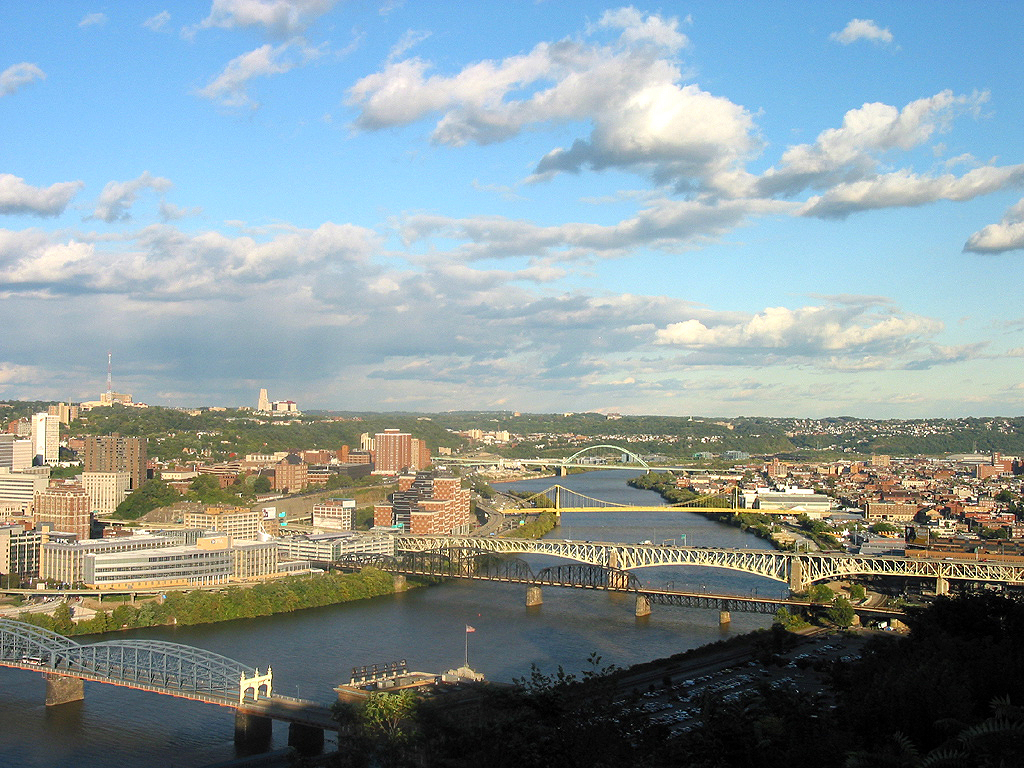
- Uptown (visible on the left side of the image) overlooking the Monongahela River

- Coordinates: 40.436°N 79.989°W
- Country: United States
- State: Pennsylvania
- County: Allegheny County
- City: Pittsburgh

Area
  - Total: 0.327 sq mi (0.85 km^{2})

Population (2020)
  - Total: 5,882
  - Density: 18,000/sq mi (6,950/km^{2})

Uptown (or the Bluff) is a neighborhood in the city of Pittsburgh, Pennsylvania, southeast of the city's Central Business District. It is bordered on the north by the Hill District and lies across the Monongahela River from South Side. The predominant area ZIP Code is 15219.

The terms Uptown and "the Bluff" have historically referred to overlapping but distinct geographical areas. Architectural historian Franklin Toker described Uptown as the Fifth and Forbes Avenue corridor between Downtown and Oakland, while describing the Bluff as a 1.5-mile (2.4 km) plateau overlooking the Monongahela. The Bluff was previously known as Ayer's Hill and Boyd's Hill; Toker identified Pipetown, Riceville, and Soho as early settlements on the plateau. Soho later referred to a smaller district around the northern end of the Birmingham Bridge; a 1977 neighborhood atlas defined it as an 86-acre (35 ha) area that is now part of the Bluff neighborhood.

The neighborhood contains Duquesne University and UPMC Mercy.

Historical population
Year	Pop.	±%
1940	9,391	—
1950	8,949	−4.7%
1960	5,955	−33.5%
1970	4,379	−26.5%
1980	4,723	+7.9%
1990	3,220	−31.8%
2000	6,423	+99.5%
2010	6,600	+2.8%
2020	5,882	−10.9%
Source: University of Pittsburgh WPRDC

== History ==
=== Boyd's Hill ===
Architectural historian Franklin Toker described the Bluff as a 1.5-mile (2.4 km) plateau overlooking the Monongahela River and noted that it had earlier been known as Ayer's Hill or Boyd's Hill. He identified Pipetown, Riceville, and Soho as early settlements on the plateau and dated the laying out of its street grid to about 1830, with most of its houses built during the following three decades.

An earlier description of Boyd's Hill was published by traveler Fortescue Cuming, who visited Pittsburgh between 1807 and 1809. Cuming wrote that the hill had formerly been called Ayre's Hill, after a British engineer who had proposed fortifying it, and that it had first been cleared and cultivated by a Highland regiment. According to Cuming, the name changed after a printer named Boyd hanged himself from a tree there about twenty years before his visit. The man was John Boyd, a Philadelphia printer who purchased Joseph Hall's interest in the Pittsburgh Gazette and became John Scull's partner in late 1786. Boyd died by suicide on the hill in early August 1788.

Cuming described Boyd's Hill as the western "termination" of a ridge extending upriver along the Monongahela. The name continued to be used for the area in the 19th century. In 1892, Pittsburgh artist Martin B. Leisser painted a view titled Boyd's Hill, depicting the densely developed and industrialized western Bluff.

Boyd's Hill was also associated with two early judicial executions in Allegheny County. Thomas Dunning, the first person executed for murder in the county, was hanged on Boyd's Hill on January 23, 1793. John Tiernan, convicted of the murder of Patrick Campbell, was hanged at the foot of Boyd's Hill in 1818. Tiernan's execution drew as many as 10,000 onlookers, and he was buried beneath the gallows.

=== Soho and urban development ===
A separate historical name, Soho, originated with James Tustin, an English émigré who came to Pittsburgh in the late 18th or early 19th century. Tustin acquired a large tract farther east along the ridge and built a stone house and fruit orchard there. His home was described in a 1915 Gazette Times article as "the most beautiful place in Pittsburgh." Tustin called his forge and estate "Soho", after the place in England where he had learned his trade, and the name came to be applied to the surrounding district. A 1977 Pittsburgh neighborhood atlas defined Soho as an 86-acre (35 ha) area flanking the northern end of the Birmingham Bridge, but Soho is no longer an official Pittsburgh neighborhood and is now included within the Bluff.

The neighborhood was originally part of Pitt Township, but was annexed in 1846. The addition was precipitated by the city's efforts at regrowth following a cataclysmic fire in 1845, which destroyed 56 acres (230,000 m^{2}) and 1,000 buildings.

Toker described Uptown as the principal corridor between Downtown and Oakland, consisting largely of 19th-century rowhouses along Fifth and Forbes avenues and their cross streets. He noted that commercial development was later added along those streets and that the district declined during the 1950s before becoming the focus of later redevelopment efforts. A 1922 guidebook, A History of Pittsburgh and Environs, noted that the area's houses were "old and not attractive, and are largely populated by foreign mill workers and their families," and a 1977 guide remarked that it was once "a pleasant residential area for many wealthy Pittsburghers" but "as industry moved in, the wealthy moved out." The neighborhood was adversely affected by Pittsburgh's urban renewal campaign in the 1960s, and in the estimation of some, "has never been reassembled."

Construction projects in the area include expansion by Duquesne University and development surrounding the arena for the Pittsburgh Penguins.

== Geography and built environment ==
The Bluff is a high plateau overlooking the Monongahela River. Toker described it as approximately 1.5 miles (2.4 km) long and distinguished it from Uptown, which he characterized as the Fifth and Forbes Avenue corridor between Downtown and Oakland. Uptown borders Downtown Pittsburgh to the west and northwest, Crawford-Roberts to the north, West Oakland to the northeast, and South Oakland to the east. To the south, the neighborhood overlooks the Monongahela and the western portion of the South Side Flats. The South Tenth Street Bridge and Birmingham Bridge connect the area with the South Side.

The westernmost portion of the Bluff is occupied by Duquesne University. The university commonly refers to its hilltop campus as "the Bluff" or "our Bluff" in university publications.

Toker described Uptown's built environment as dominated by 19th-century rowhouses along Fifth and Forbes avenues and their cross streets, with later commercial blocks interspersed among them. Fifth Avenue includes law offices, restaurants and bars, as well as parking used by Downtown commuters.

A flight of 170 public city steps connects Bluff Street with Second Avenue and includes a pedestrian overpass above the Boulevard of the Allies. The stairway provides a pedestrian route between Duquesne University, the South Tenth Street Bridge and the South Side.

== Gallery ==
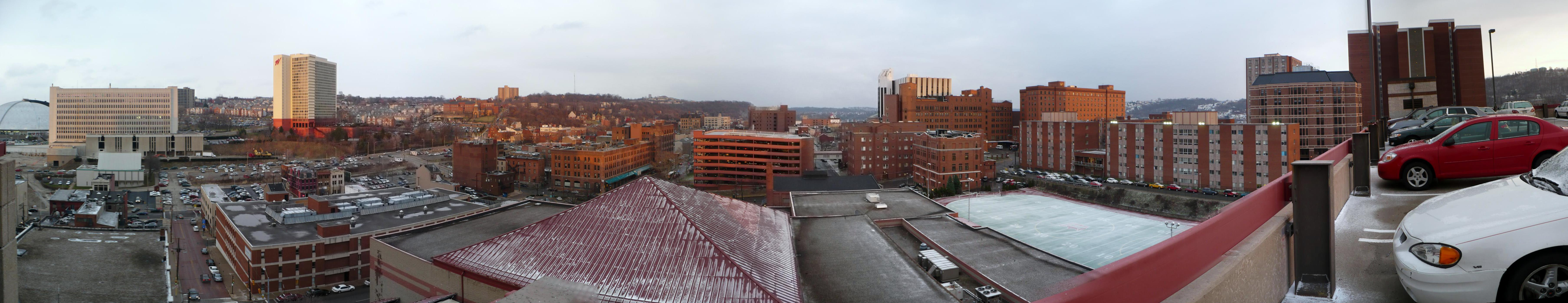
A panoramic view of Pittsburgh's Bluff or Uptown neighborhood from the top of a parking garage at Duquesne University from January 2008
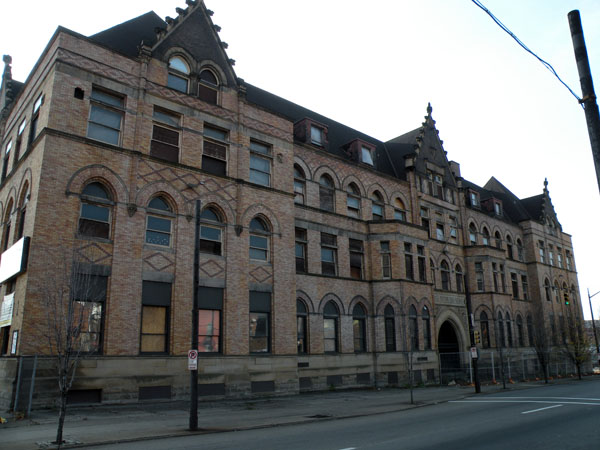
Fifth Avenue High School, built in 1894, at 1800 5th Avenue.

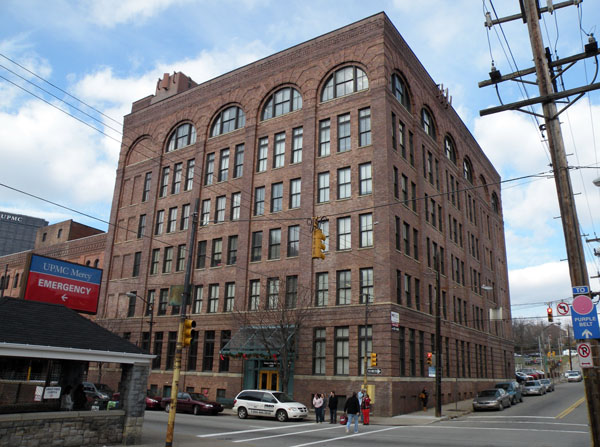
Reymer Brothers Candy Factory, built circa 1910, at 1425 Forbes Avenue.

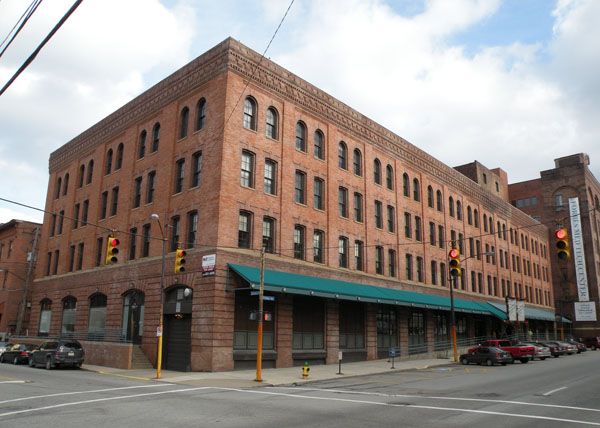
Kaufmann's Department Store Warehouse, built circa 1910, at 1401 Forbes Avenue.

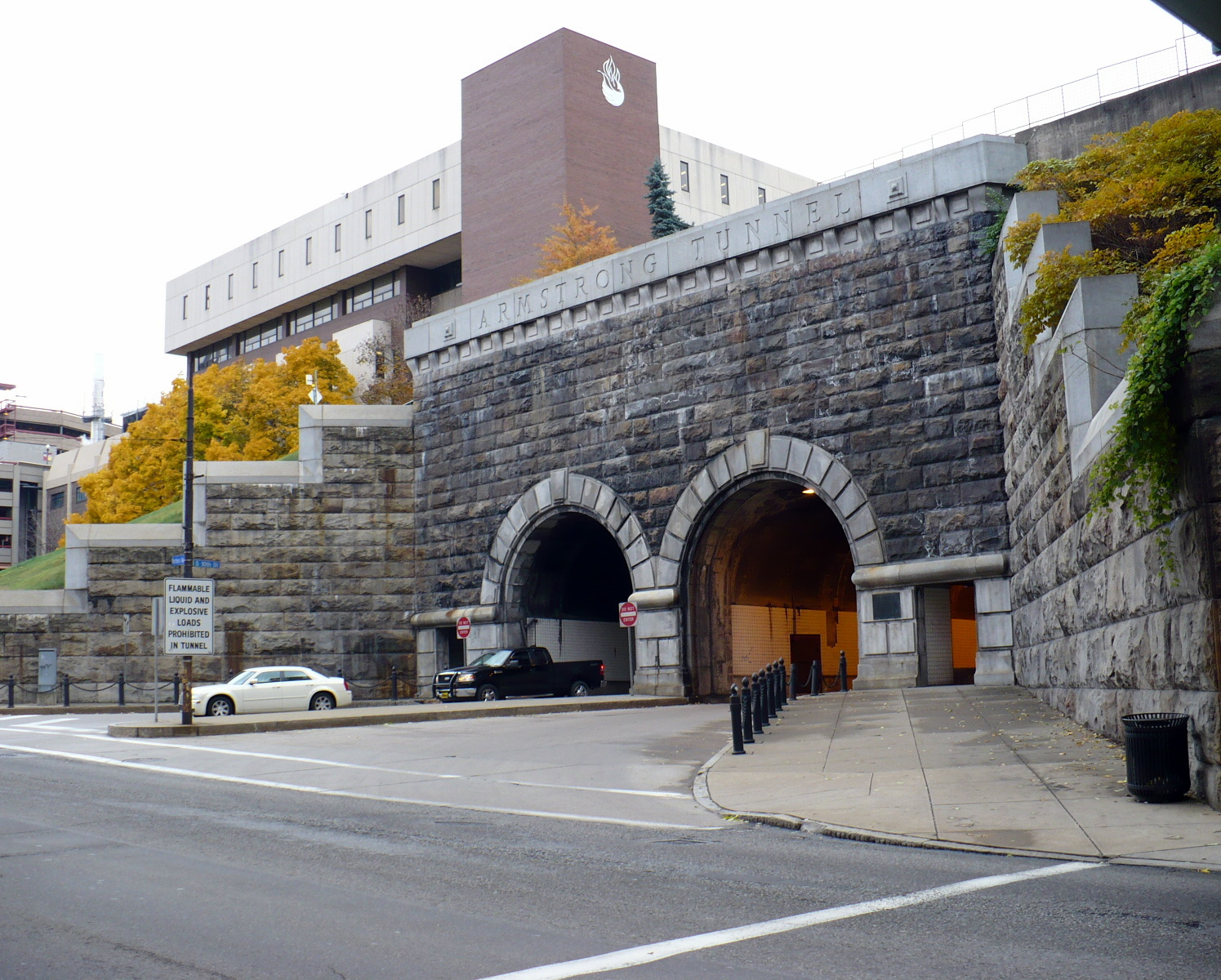
Armstrong Tunnel, built in 1926, between Forbes and 2nd Avenues at S. 10th Street.

South Tenth Street Bridge, opened in 1933, over the Monongahela River at S. 10th Street.

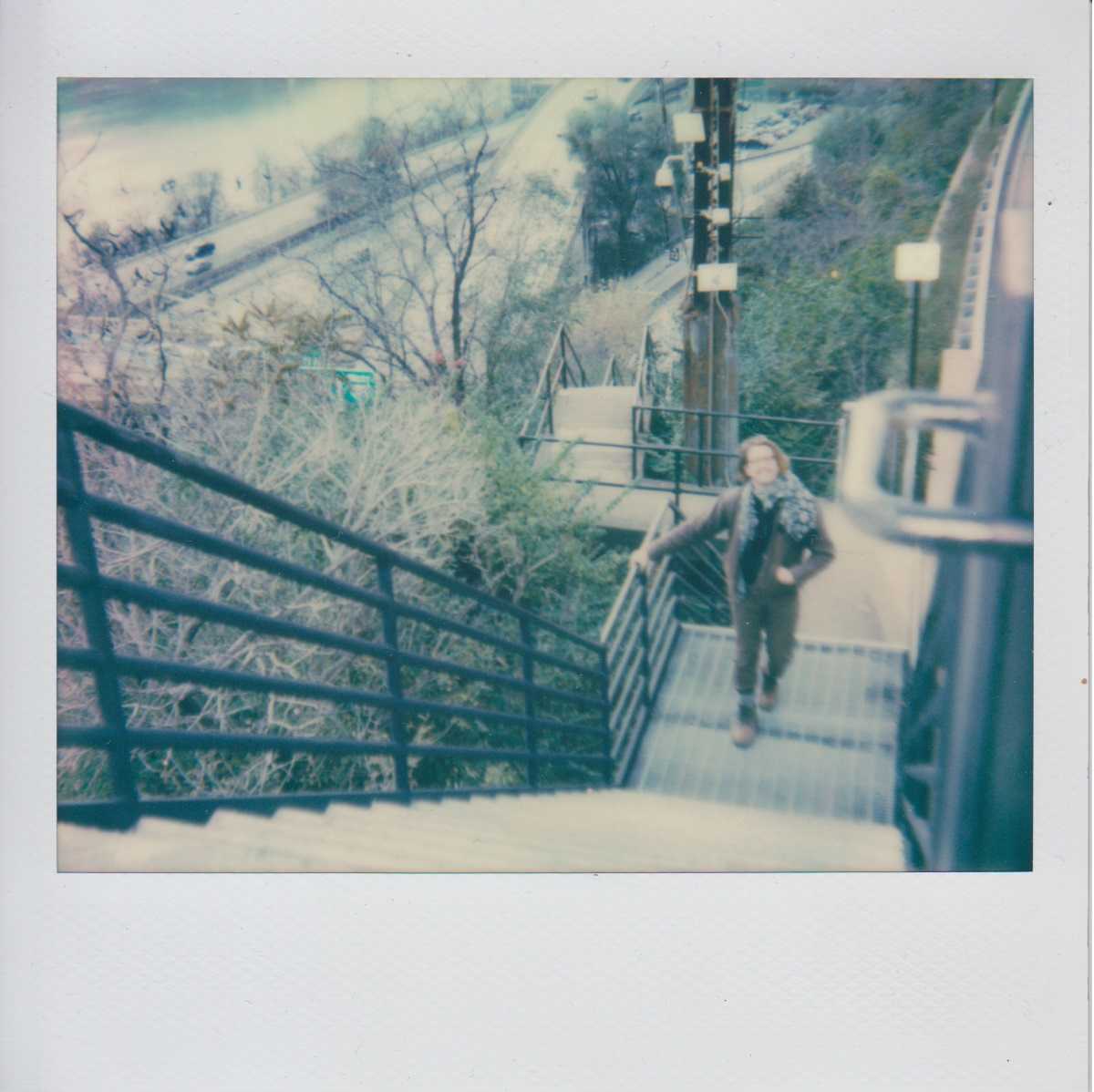
The city steps connecting Second Avenue to Bluff Street in the Bluff-Uptown neighborhood of Pittsburgh.

== See also ==
- List of Pittsburgh neighborhoods
