= List of City of Pittsburgh historic designations =

Historic designations in the City of Pittsburgh are awarded following nominations for districts and individual structures that are reviewed and recommended to Pittsburgh City Council, which makes the final decision, by the city's Historic Review Commission and the City Planning Commission. This list is not to be confused with the list of landmarks designated by the Pittsburgh History and Landmarks Foundation. City Historic Designation establishes a regulatory process for the review of all changes and alterations by the Historic Review Commission to the publicly viewable exterior and appearance of all buildings that are designated, either individually or as part of a district. As of 2011, there were 12 designated districts in the city, two historic objects, one historic site, and 87 individual structures.

== Districts ==
This following table lists the 14 historic districts designated by the Pittsburgh City Council through 2019. The table is initially sorted alphabetically by their official listing.

District name	Image	Date listed	Location
Allegheny West Historic District		November 26, 1990	District boundaries viewable here
Alpha Terrace Historic District		January 1996	District boundaries viewable here
Deutschtown Historic District		February 12, 1997	District boundaries viewable here
East Carson Street Historic District		August 16, 1993; Expanded June 1999	District boundaries viewable here
Lemmon Row Historic District		May 25, 2017	District boundaries viewable here
Manchester Historic District		July 30, 1979	District boundaries viewable here
Market Square Historic District		December 28, 1992	District boundaries viewable here
Mexican War Streets Historic District		December 26, 1972	District boundaries viewable here
Murray Hill Avenue Historic District		April 3, 2000	District boundaries viewable here
Oakland Civic Center Historic District		April 7, 1992	District boundaries viewable here
Oakland Square Historic District		June 14, 2005	District guidelines are available here
Penn-Liberty Historic District		October 1987; Expanded March 1999	District boundaries viewable here
Roslyn Place Historic District		March 20, 2018	District boundaries viewable here
Schenley Farms Historic District		May 1982	District boundaries viewable here
Winter Homes Historic District		October 19, 2017	2314–2316 Brownsville Road

== Objects ==
The following table the two historic objects designated by the Pittsburgh City Council as of July 2010. The table is initially sorted alphabetically by their official listing.

District name	Image	Date listed	Location
"Horse Tamer" sculptures		July 26, 2002	Highland Park
"Welcome" sculptures		July 26, 2002	Highland Park

== Sites ==
This following table lists the one historic site designated by the Pittsburgh City Council through 2010. More recent listings are included with a separate reference.

District name	Image	Date listed	Location
Allegheny Arsenal Officers' Quarters and Wall Segments		September 30, 2026	Lower Lawrenceville
Allegheny Commons Parks		November 26, 1990	Site boundaries viewable here
Beth Abraham Cemetery Complex		May 21, 2024	800 Stewart Avenue
Frick Park		March 6, 2024	2005 Beechwood Boulevard
Roslyn Place		May 25, 2017	Roslyn Place
Schenley Park		October 22, 2025	Squirrel Hill
Veterans' Memorial Parklet		May 21, 2024	1020 Brookline Boulevard
Westinghouse Park		December 18, 2025	320 North Murtland Street

== Structures ==
The following table is up to date as of the most recent listings published by the City of Pittsburgh in June 2019. More recent listings are included with a separate reference. The table is initially sorted alphabetically by official listing name.

Landmark name	Image	Date listed	Location
141 Mayflower Street		June 1999	141 Mayflower Street
412 Boulevard of the Allies		January 4, 2023	412 Boulevard of the Allies
Aberlie House		February 13, 2001	122-124 East North Avenue
Allegheny Arsenal		February 22, 1977	Penn Avenue at 40th Street
Allegheny City Stables		August 1, 2007	836 West North Avenue
Allegheny County Courthouse		December 26, 1972	436 Grant Street
Allegheny County Jail		December 26, 1972	400 block Ross Street
Allegheny County Mortuary		September 26, 2002	542 Fourth Avenue
Anathan House		September 23, 2025	1620 Murray Avenue
Allegheny Library		March 15, 1974	Allegheny Center
Allegheny Middle School (formerly Allegheny High School)		November 30, 1999	810 Arch Street
Arsenal Middle School (formerly Arsenal Junior High School)		November 30, 1999	3901 Butler Street
Bayard School		March 6, 2017	4830 Hatfield Street
Beltzhoover Elementary School		November 30, 1999	320 Cedarhurst Street
Benedum Center for the Performing Arts		November 20, 1984	207 Seventh Street (Included in Penn-Liberty Historic District)
Bradberry Apartments		March 13, 2020	1130 Reddour St.
Byers-Lyons House (currently Byers Hall of the Community College of Allegheny County)		March 15, 1974	901 Ridge Avenue (Included in Allegheny West Historic District)
Buhl Planetarium and Institute of Popular Science Building (former, now part of the Pittsburgh Children's Museum)		July 29, 2005	Allegheny Square
Calvary United Methodist Church		February 22, 1977	Allegheny Avenue at Beech Avenue (Included in Allegheny West Historic District)
Card Lane Carriage House		May 31, 2016	7122–7128 Card Lane
Carrick Municipal Building		April 11, 2019	1806 Brownsville Road
Rachel Carson Bridge		October 22, 2025	9th Street over the Allegheny River
Catahecassa (Snyder) Spring		March 6, 2017	E. Circuit Road, Schenley Park
Cathedral of Learning		February 22, 1977	4200 Fifth Avenue (Included in Oakland Civic Center Historic District)
2621 Centre Avenue - The YMCA Building		August 8, 1995	2621 Centre Avenue
Pittsburgh Children's Museum		December 26, 1972	10 Children's Way, Allegheny Center
Roberto Clemente Bridge		October 22, 2025	6th Street over the Allegheny River
Colfax Elementary School		November 30, 1999	2332 Beechwood Boulevard
Concord Elementary School		November 30, 1999	2340 Brownsville Road
Congregation B'nai Israel		March 6, 2024	327 North Negley Avenue
Connelley Vocational High School			1435 Bedford Avenue
David P. Oliver High School		November 30, 1999	2323 Brighton Road
Dilworth Traditional Academy (formerly Dilworth Elementary School)		November 30, 1999	6200 Stanton Avenue
Bad Azz Bbq (formerly Beck's Run School)		September 28, 1987	1000 Beck's Run Road
Emmanuel Episcopal Church		February 22, 1977	957 West North Avenue (Included in Allegheny West Historic District)
Engine Company No. 1 and No. 30		March 17, 1993	344 Boulevard of the Allies
Engine Company No. 3		April 12, 1995	1416 Arch Street
Engine Company No. 28		December 28, 2021	700 Filbert Street
Fairhaven Church		September 20, 2013	2415 Saw Mill Run Boulevard
Ferris House (Former house of George Washington Gale Ferris Jr.)		June 28, 2001	1318 Arch Street
Fifth Avenue High School		November 30, 1999	1800 Fifth Avenue
Friendship Elementary School (formerly Liberty School Number 4)		November 30, 1999	5501 Friendship Avenue
Stephen Foster Community Center (currently the Catholic Youth Association)		July 8, 1982	286 Main Street
Gallagher-Kieffer House		December 1, 2020	234 North Dithridge Street
Garden Theatre		April 4, 2008	12 West North Avenue
The New Granada Theater		October 8, 2004	2009-13 Centre Avenue
Greenfield Elementary School		November 30, 1999	1 Alger Street
Guckenheimer Warehouse		May 9, 1995	125 First Avenue
Hanauer-Rosenberg Residence		October 28, 2020	417 Lockhart Street
Hazelwood Branch - Carnegie Library of Pittsburgh		July 28, 2004	4748 Monongahela Street
Heathside Cottage		November 6, 2019	416 Catoma Street
Hefty House		July 12, 2018	624–626 East Ohio Street
Herron Hill Pumping Station		December 1, 2020	4501 Centre Avenue
Homewood Branch - Carnegie Library of Pittsburgh		July 28, 2004	7101 Hamilton Avenue
Howe-Childs Gate House		April 16, 1986	5918 Fifth Avenue
Howe Springs		March 6, 2017	Fifth Avenue between S. Highland Ave. and College St.
Hunt Armory		February 27, 2014	324 Emerson Street
Immanuel Church		February 5, 2015	1000 Madison Avenue
Iron City Brewery		July 7, 2010	3340 Liberty Avenue
John Wesley A.M.E. Zion Church		October 11, 1993	594 Herron Avenue
B. F. Jones House (currently Jones Hall of the Community College of Allegheny County)		March 15, 1974	808 Ridge Avenue (Included in the Allegheny West Historic District)
Jones & Laughlin Headquarters Building		October 28, 2020	200 Ross Street
Ella and Emil Keller House		December 16, 2023	201 North Murtland Street
King Estate or Baywood		November 12, 1992	5501 Elgin Street
Langley High School		November 30, 1999	2940 Sheraden Boulevard
Lawrenceville Branch - Carnegie Library of Pittsburgh		July 28, 2004	279 Fisk Street
Lemington Elementary School		November 30, 1999	7061 Lemington Avenue
Lincoln Elementary School (Pittsburgh, Pennsylvania)		November 30, 1999	328 Lincoln Avenue
Lord & Taylor Department Store (formerly the Mellon National Bank Building)		July 1999	514 Smithfield Street
Lowen-Shaffer House		February 10, 1992	311 Lowenhill Street
Mackintosh-Hemphill Company (Garrison Foundry) Buildings (former)		October 18, 1991	901-11 Bingham Street (Included in East Carson Street Historic District)
Madison Elementary School (formerly Minersville Public School)		November 30, 1999	3401 Milwaukee Street
Malta Temple		August 14, 2008	100 West North Avenue
Mamaux Building		July 27, 1995	121-23 First Avenue
Mellon Park		February 24, 2021	1047 Shady Avenue
Mifflin Elementary School		November 30, 1999	1290 Mifflin Road
Monongahela Incline		March 15, 1974	Between West Carson Street, near Smithfield Street, and Grandview Avenue
Moreland-Hoffstot House		February 22, 1977	5057 Fifth Avenue
Mount Washington Branch - Carnegie Library of Pittsburgh		July 28, 2004	315 Grandview Avenue
Mowry-Addison Mansion		July 9, 2020	5134 Carnegie Street
Naser's Tavern		May 30, 2014	4025–4029 Butler Street
National Negro Opera Company House		June 3, 2008	7101 Apple Street
Neill Log House		February 22, 1977	East Circuit Road near Serpentine Drive in Schenley Park
Nunnery Hill Incline retaining wall and base station		March 22, 2011	1530 Federal Street, Henderson Street
Old Heidelberg Apartments		March 15, 1974	401-423 South Braddock Avenue
Old Stone Tavern		October 7, 2009	434 Greentree Road
Oliver Bath House		September 14, 2017	38 S. 10th Street
Overbrook Municipal Building		December 28, 2017	2410 Saw Mill Run Boulevard
Panther Hollow Bridge		July 26, 2002	Schenley Park
Paramount Pictures Film Exchange		January 28, 2010	1727 Boulevard of the Allies
Pennsylvania National Bank Building		March 13, 2020	3400 Butler Street
Perry Traditional Academy		November 30, 1999	3875 Perrysville Avenue
Peterson House		October 8, 2018	172 46th Street
Phipps Conservatory		December 26, 1972	Schenley Park
Pittsburgh City-County Building		March 13, 2020	414 Grant Street
Pittsburgh and Lake Erie Railroad Station		March 15, 1974	Smithfield Street near West Carson Street
Pittsburgh Stained Glass Studio		November 27, 2024	160 Warden Street
Pittsburgh Wash House		July 12, 2018	3495 Butler Street
Ross and Aspinwall Pumping Stations		October 22, 2025	900 Freeport Road
St. Anthony of Padua Shrine		February 22, 1977	1700 Harpster Street
Saint Mary's Academy Building		January 14, 2009	340 46th Street
Saint Michael's Roman Catholic Church & Rectory		February 23, 2001	21 Pius Street
Sal's Barber Shop		April 10, 2024	712 Brookline Boulevard
Schenley Bridge		July 26, 2002	Schenley Park
Schiller Classical Academy (formerly Schiller School)		November 30, 1999	1018 Peralta Street
Sellers-Carnahan House		December 31, 1995	400 Shady Avenue
Sheraden Homestead		July 12, 2018	2803 Bergman Street
Shrine of the Blessed Mother		October 13, 2020	6 Wakefield Street
Smithfield Street Bridge		February 22, 1977	Smithfield Street over the Monongahela River
W. P. Snyder House (currently Babb Insurance Company)		March 15, 1974	852 Ridge Avenue (Included in Allegheny West Historic District)
Soldiers and Sailors Memorial Hall Museum		February 11, 1991	4141 Fifth Avenue (Included in Oakland Civic Center Historic District)
South Side Market House		February 22, 1977	South 12th and Bingham Streets at Bedford Square (Included in East Carson Street Historic District)
South Side Presbyterian Church		May 30, 2019	1926 Sarah Street
Spring Hill Elementary School		October 28, 2020	1351 Damas Street
Sterrett Classical Academy (formerly Sterrett School)		November 30, 1999	7100 Reynolds Street
Thaddeus Stevens Elementary School (formerly Thaddeus Stevens School)		November 30, 1999	824 Crucible Street
Sunnyledge (former McClelland House)		April 12, 1995	5136 Fifth Avenue
Temple Rodef Shalom		May 31, 2022	4905 Fifth Avenue
Three Sisters: Roberto Clemente Bridge; Andy Warhol Bridge; Rachel Carson Bridge		October 22, 2025	Downtown Pittsburgh at the Allegheny River
Tito House		June 11, 2022	1817 Fifth Avenue
Troy Hill Fire House No. 11		July 21, 2022	1800 Ley Street
Tufa Bridges		February 15, 2018	Schenley Park
Turney House		September 25, 2015	160 43rd Street
U.S. Post Office and Courthouse		March 13, 2020	700 Grant Street
VA Facility Chapel Building 10		February 4, 2021	7180 Highland Drive
VA Facility Laboratory Building 13		February 4, 2021	7180 Highland Drive
Victoria Hall (formerly the Ursuline Academy, previously Lynch House)		August 20, 1982	201 South Winebiddle Street
Voegtly Spring		March 6, 2017	Damas Street
Walton House		September 25, 2015	4412–4414 Plummer Street
Andy Warhol Bridge		October 22, 2025	7th Street over the Allegheny River
West End Branch - Carnegie Library of Pittsburgh		July 28, 2004	47 Wabash Street
Westinghouse High School		November 30, 1999	1101 North Murtland Street
Westinghouse Memorial		March 7, 2019	Schenley Park
Wigman House		July 25, 2011	1425 Brownsville Road
August Wilson House		March 7, 2008	1727 Bedford Avenue
Woods House		February 22, 1977	4604 Monongahela Street
Woolslair Elementary Gifted Center (formerly Woolslair Elementary School)		November 30, 1999	40th Street & Liberty Avenue
Workingman's Savings Bank & Trust Co.		March 17, 2009	800 East Ohio Street

== Former listings ==
Landmark name	Image	Date listed	Location
Albright United Methodist Church		September 26, 2016	486 S. Graham Street
Greater Faith Tabernacle Church of God in Christ (demolished)		February 6, 1995	550 North Homewood Avenue
Saint Nicholas Croatian Catholic Church (demolished)		July 13, 2001	1326 East Ohio Street

== Active nominations ==
Landmark name	Image	Date nominated	Location
Allegheny Turn Halle		May 2023	855 South Canal Street

== Notable failed nominations ==
Landmark name	Image	Date nominated	Location
Abrams House		December 2018	118-A Woodland Road
Civic Arena		April 2011	66 Mario Lemieux Place
Croatian Fraternal Union Building		October 2018	3441 Forbes Avenue
Ewalt House		November 2019	186 Home Street
Giovannitti House		August 1991	118 Woodland Road
Jones & Laughlin Steel - Pittsburgh Works		March 1988	South Side
Pittsburgh Produce Terminal		October 2013	2100 Smallman Street
Syria Mosque		April 1991	4400 Bigelow Boulevard

== See also ==
- List of Pittsburgh History and Landmarks Foundation Historic Landmarks
- National Register of Historic Places listings in Pittsburgh, Pennsylvania
- National Register of Historic Places listings in Allegheny County, Pennsylvania
- List of Pennsylvania state historical markers in Allegheny County
