= Baywood =

Baywood can refer to a place in the United States:

- Baywood, Louisiana
- Baywood, New York
- Baywood (Pittsburgh), a Pittsburgh Landmark

Baywood can also refer to:

- Wood from a Bay tree (disambiguation)
