= Down the Road =

Down the Road may refer to:

== Music ==
=== Albums ===
- Down the Road (Larry Stewart album), 1993
- Down the Road (Manassas album), or the title song, 1973
- Down the Road (Van Morrison album), or the title song, 2002

=== Songs ===
- "Down the Road" (C2C song), 2012
- "Down the Road" (Mac McAnally song), 1990; covered by Kenny Chesney with McAnally, 2008
- "Down the Road", by the Bee Gees from Mr. Natural, 1974
- "Down the Road", by Earl Scruggs, 1949
- "Down the Road", by Kansas from Song for America, 1975
- "Down the Road", by Mary McCaslin, covered by Stan Rogers on From Coffee House to Concert Hall, 1999

== Other uses ==
- Down the Road (film) or Nobody Gets Out Alive, a 2012 American horror film
- Down the Road Saloon, formerly Beck's Run School, a historical building in Pittsburgh, Pennsylvania, U.S.
