= Bay tree =

Bay tree can refer to:

- Bay laurel (Laurus nobilis), a tree in the family Lauraceae native to Europe
- Sweet bay tree (Magnolia virginiana), a tree in the family Magnoliaceae native to southeastern North America
- West Indian bay tree (Pimenta racemosa), a tree in the family Myrtaceae native to the Caribbean
- California bay laurel (Umbellularia), a tree in the family Lauraceae native to western North America
- Bay Tree, Alberta
- Bay Tree (Fabergé egg)

And sometimes confused with

- Prunus laurocerasus

== See also ==
- Baywood (disambiguation)
