= Dilworth Elementary School (Pittsburgh, Pennsylvania) =

- U.S. National Register of Historic Places
- City of Pittsburgh Historic Structure
- Pittsburgh Landmark – PHLF
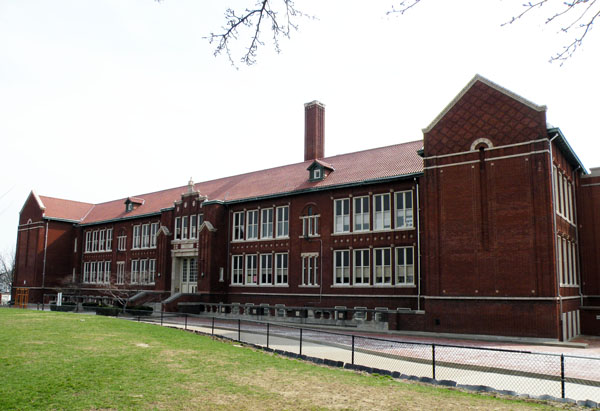

- Location within Pittsburgh Location within Pennsylvania Location within the United States
- Location: 6200 Stanton Ave., Pittsburgh, Pennsylvania
- Coordinates: 40°28′5.57″N 79°55′2.96″W
- Area: 2.1 acres (0.85 ha)
- Built: 1915
- Architect: Vrydaugh & Wolfe; Dawson Construction Co.
- Architectural style: Tudor Revival, Jacobean Revival
- MPS: Pittsburgh Public Schools TR
- NRHP reference No.: 86002663

Significant dates
- Added to NRHP: September 30, 1986
- Designated CPHS: November 30, 1999
- Designated PHLF: 1997

The Dilworth Elementary School in Pittsburgh, Pennsylvania, is a historic school building, completed in April 1915. As of 2026 it is a traditional Magnet school for pre-kindergarten through the fifth grade in the Pittsburgh Public Schools system. It was listed on the National Register of Historic Places in 1986.

== History ==
The school is named for the Dilworth family. William Dilworth (1791-1871) is credited with providing a school and teacher on Mt. Washington in the 1820s. Mary Parry Dilworth, widow of descendant John S. Dilworth later donated the land on which the Dilworth school was built. The architects, Martin U. Vrydaugh and Thomas B. Wolfe, also designed churches and homes for wealthy patrons, including the Calvary United Methodist Church. The school was designed three years after the Pittsburgh and Allegheny City school boards where merged.

The building is brick, H-shaped, and 2 1/2 stories high. It was a consciously elegant design, stylistically unique in the city when built, echoing European school designs. It included kindergarten and basement play spaces as were becoming essential at the time; but here the playrooms did not receive as much design attention as such elements would later on, and were not particularly functional. An auditorium was added in 1927 and was well designed for its intended use with a full stage, and directly accessible without entering the main portion of the school.
