= Centre Avenue YMCA Building =

- U.S. National Register of Historic Places
- Pittsburgh Historic Designation
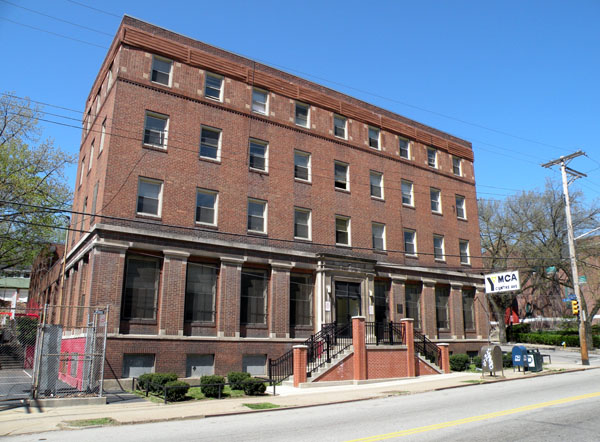
- The building in 2010

- Location within Pittsburgh
- Location: 2621 Centre Avenue (Middle Hill District), Pittsburgh, Pennsylvania, USA
- Coordinates: 40°26′49.84″N 79°58′3.81″W
- Built: 1922
- NRHP reference No.: 100007092

Significant dates
- Added to NRHP: November 3, 2021
- Designated PGHL: August 8, 1995

The Centre Avenue YMCA Building located at 2621 Centre Avenue in the Middle Hill District neighborhood of Pittsburgh, Pennsylvania, was built in 1922. A sign on the building says the following: "Centre Avenue YMCA - This building was erected in 1922 to house the only YMCA for African-Americans in Western Pennsylvania. The Centre Avenue YMCA served not only as one of the only recreational areas facilities for African-Americans from the 1920s through the 1950s, but was also a center of social and cultural life in the community, and was famous for free symposiums held here during the 1930s and '40s with nationally prominent African-Americans. Pittsburgh Historic Review Commission. Marker dedicated 1994." The building was added to the List of City of Pittsburgh historic designations on August 8, 1995, and was added to the National Register of Historic Places in 2021.
