= Allegheny County Mortuary =

Historic building

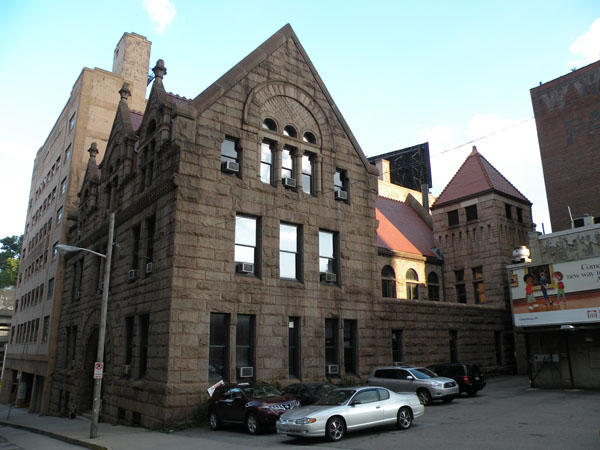

- Location within Pittsburgh
- 40°26′14.33″N 79°59′46.14″W
- Location: 542 Fourth Avenue (Downtown), Pittsburgh, Pennsylvania, United States

History
- Built: 1903

The Allegheny County Mortuary located at 542 Fourth Avenue in downtown Pittsburgh, Pennsylvania, was built in 1903. It was added to the List of City of Pittsburgh historic designations on September 26, 2002.

== History ==
Designed by architect Frederick John Osterling, the Allegheny County Mortuary was created in a style similar to that of the Allegheny County Jail and Courthouse, which had been designed by architect Henry Hobson Richardson. "Just 27 years after it was built," according to historians at the Carnegie Science Center, the mortuary "was moved approximately 297 feet to its current address on Fourth Avenue to make room for the County Office Building." The structure was repositioned by a team of one hundred men "by turning jacks one-quarter turn at a time in unison to lift the building 20 feet off its foundation," a process which raised the morgue one-half inch "by each quarter turn of the jacks," which was supported by horse teams "walking in circles" to turn "the winch that pulled the morgue along steel rails atop the massive cribbing."

=== Historic status designation ===
A measure to award historic status to the Allegheny County Mortuary was introduced at the June 18, 2002 meeting of the Council of the City of Pittsburgh. A public hearing was then held by the city's Committee on Planning, Zoning & Land Use on June 26, and made available to the public via cable television. A second public hearing was subsequently conducted by the city's Committee on Hearings on September 3, 2002. The city's Committee on Planning, Zoning & Land Use then affirmatively recommended on September 11 that the city council adopt the measure. Passed by Pittsburgh's city council on September 17, it was signed into law by the mayor on September 26, 2002.

==== Resolution text ====
Presented by Ms. Burns to the Council of the City of Pittsburgh on June 18, 2002:

"Resolution providing for the designation as a Historic Structure under Section 513 of Chapter 1007 of the Code of Ordinances that certain structure located at 542 Fourth Avenue Street, known as the Allegheny County Mortuary, and all of the property designated as Block and Lot Number 002-J-044, in the 1st Ward, City of Pittsburgh.

WHEREAS, the City of Pittsburgh has duly enacted Section 513 of Chapter 1007 of the Code of Ordinances, which protects and preserves Historic Structures, Districts, Sites, and Objects; and

WHEREAS, Mr. Walter Kidney, a resident of Pittsburgh, has nominated this building for designation as a Historic Structure; and

WHEREAS, the Historic Review Commission has held a public hearing to gather testimony from property owners and other interested parties concerning the appropriateness of this designation; and

WHEREAS, the Historic Review Commission has voted to recommend that City Council DESIGNATE the Allegheny County Mortuary as a Historic Structure; and

WHEREAS, the City Planning Commission has held a public hearing to gather testimony from property owners and other interested parties concerning the appropriateness of this designation; and

WHEREAS, the City Planning Commission has voted to recommend that City Council DESIGNATE the Allegheny County Mortuary as a Historic Structure; and

WHEREAS, the Council of the City of Pittsburgh has held a public hearing to gather testimony from the public concerning the appropriateness of this designation; and

WHEREAS, the Council of the City of Pittsburgh finds that the aforementioned structure is a Historic Structure

that should be preserved;

BE IT RESOLVED BY THE COUNCIL OF THE CITY OF PITTSBURGH AS FOLLOWS:

Pursuant to the provisions of Section 513.3 of Chapter 1007 of the Code of Ordinances, the Council of the City of Pittsburgh hereby designates as a Historic Structure the structure located at 542 Fourth Avenue, and known as the Allegheny County Mortuary, and including all of the property designated as Block and Lot Number 002-J-044, in the 1st Ward, City of Pittsburgh.

Section 2. Any Resolution or Ordinance or part thereof, conflicting with the provisions of this Resolution is hereby repealed so far as the same affects this Resolution."
