= Engine Company No. 28 (Pittsburgh) =

Historic Firehouse

- Pittsburgh Historic Designation
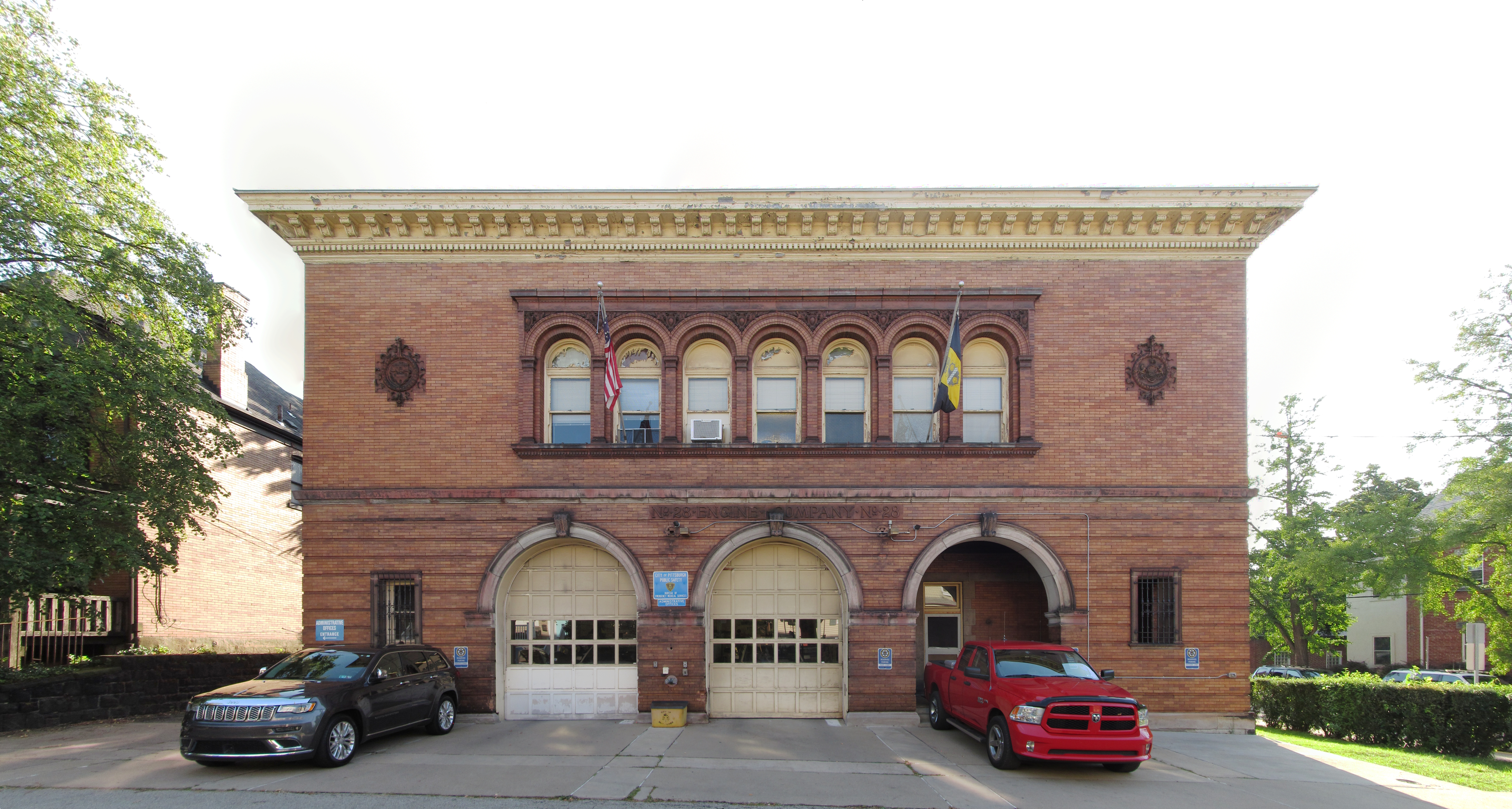
- Location: Pittsburgh, PA
- Built: 1899
- Architect: Harry S. Blair

Engine Company No. 28 located at 700 Filbert St., Pittsburgh, PA, 15232, is an Italian Renaissance Revival construction. The building's two stories, divided into five horizontal bays that span the structure's horizontality, are rendered in the vernacular material of brick masonry. The building was constructed in 1899 on the south corner plot at the intersection of Filbert and Elmer streets, initially serving as a fire and hose company before a change in function during the late 1970s. The firehouse now houses the Pittsburgh EMS Headquarters....

== History ==
Turn of the century growth in the wealthy Shadyside neighborhood resulted in a municipal scheme to establish the 28th Engine company to service the ward. Prior attempts in February 1898 to find a plot to house the new hose and ladder company, particularly at the intersection of Baum and Graham streets, failed due to residential zoning regulations. In May of that same year, the Filbert/Elmer location was purchased for $8,550. The structure, constructed under the guidance of the firm Kerr & Fox, was financed by Pittsburgh's resolution No. 566. 1 The station commenced operations in the 20th ward on November 3 of 1899. The company received a plethora of new technologies throughout 1900: a LaFrance Fire Engine Company's second-size Metropolitan crane-neck engine and a Fire Extinguisher Manufacturing's Champion chemical engine/hose wagon. Both of which required multiple horses to operate.

In contrast to earlier praises of luxurious amenities and ornament, the station had noticeably degraded by 1967. The building's wooden fixtures were given particular attention as local offices, such as Oakland Justice of the Peace, Donald Glunt, believed the building to be unsafe and a fire hazard for employees. Following a series of restorations for the 70's, the Engine house ceased functioning and became the headquarters of Pittsburgh EMS.

== Architecture ==
The Engine Company was designed by Harry S. Blair, the chief architect for the Pittsburgh Department of Public Safety at the time of No. 28's construction The Italian Renaissance Revival, an architectural movement noted for being both a strand of the Eclectic movement and a derivative of traditional Italian architecture, such as the Palazzo Medici, is characteristic of firehouses of the era. The Neo-Classical and Beaux-arts vocabularies already had ingrained relations to governmental structures, so firehouse stylings, most often rendered in red brick, found more esoteric origins in Italian villas, French chalets, and other Industrial Revolution reactionary movements.

Fire House No. 28's external bays, inhabited by string lines, detailed balconies, and round arched/coupled fenestration, are expressed in light-brown bricks. The bricks, laid in a stretched bond pattern, take the form of recessed banks on the first floor before progressing upwards to form a stone belt course between the ground floor and the Piano Nobile. The roofline is flat and is marked by a metal cornice with corbels and dentils.

The building's interior was widely regarded as a handsome structure, equipped with the newest amenities the Industrial world had to offer. The first floor was dominated by stalls for six teams of horses, while the second served a more domestic function with a dormitory and bath for 18 of the company's men. The basement contained a state-of-the-art swimming pool.
