= Lowen-Shaffer House =

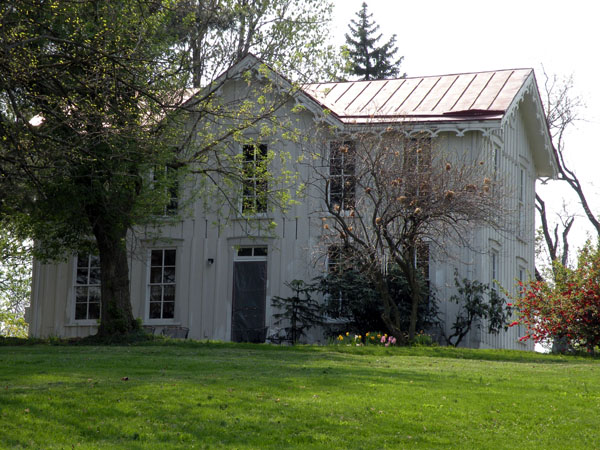

- Location within Pittsburgh
- 40°25′8.74″N 80°1′19.91″W
- Location: 311 Lowenhill Street (Beechview), Pittsburgh, Pennsylvania, USA

History
- Built: circa 1850

Lowen-Shaffer House located at 311 Lowenhill Street in the Beechview neighborhood of Pittsburgh, Pennsylvania, was built circa 1850. John Lowen was the builder and original owner of this Carpenter Gothic style house. It was added to the List of City of Pittsburgh historic designations on February 10, 1992.
