= Howe-Childs Gate House =

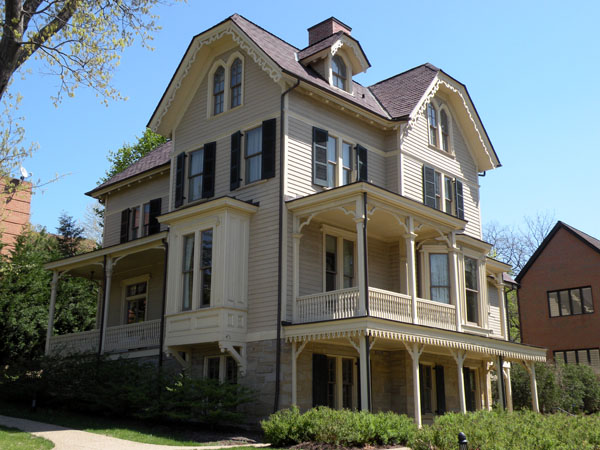

- Location within Pittsburgh
- 40°27′4.16″N 79°55′29.58″W
- Location: 5918 Fifth Avenue (Shadyside), Pittsburgh, Pennsylvania, USA

History
- Built: circa 1861

Site notes
- Governing body: Chatham University

The Howe-Childs Gate House which is located at 5918 Fifth Avenue in the Shadyside neighborhood of Pittsburgh, Pennsylvania, was built circa 1861.

It was added to the List of City of Pittsburgh historic designations on April 16, 1986, and the List of Pittsburgh History and Landmarks Foundation Historic Landmarks in 2004.

== History and architectural features ==
Originally named "Willow Cottage", this historic structure was built for Thomas Marshall Howe, and is reportedly the oldest wood-frame house in Pittsburgh and the oldest existing house from the city's "Millionaire's Row." Former owners of the clapboard Gothic revival/cottage style house include members of the Howe and Childs families, Mary Howe Childs, and also Michael L. Benedum. The house is currently owned by Chatham University. It was added to the List of City of Pittsburgh historic designations on April 16, 1986, and the List of Pittsburgh History and Landmarks Foundation Historic Landmarks in 2004.
