= Gallagher-Kieffer House =

Historic building

- U.S. National Register of Historic Places
- Pittsburgh Historic Designation
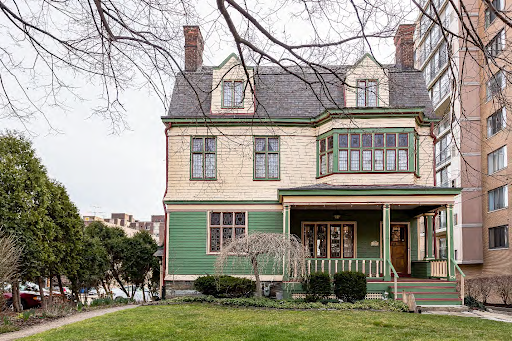
- The Gallagher-Kieffer House in March 2020

- Location within Pittsburgh Location within Pennsylvania Location within the United States
- Location: 234 North Dithridge St., Pittsburgh, Pennsylvania, USA
- Coordinates: 40°27′00″N 79°57′08″W
- Built: 1893
- Architectural style: Shingle
- NRHP reference No.: 100011617

Significant dates
- Added to NRHP: April 4, 2025
- Designated CPHS: December 1, 2020

The Gallagher-Kieffer House is a historic house in the North Oakland neighborhood of Pittsburgh, Pennsylvania. Built in 1893 in the Shingle architectural style, the house was the home of Patrick F. Gallagher, president of the Duquesne Construction Company from 1931 to 1938, and his family. In 2020, the house was nominated by Preservation Pittsburgh and approved by the Pittsburgh City Council as a City of Pittsburgh Historic Structure. It was listed on the National Register of Historic Places in 2025.

== History ==
The land on which 234 North Dithridge Street now stands was inherited by Isabella W. C. Comingo from her father, Neville B. Craig, who was Pittsburgh's City Solicitor, owner and editor of the Pittsburgh Gazette, and, in 1843, a one-term Representative in the Pennsylvania House of Representatives. Isabella was in the process of partitioning and selling off her land when her last two living children died accidentally. It was said that the deaths of her sons caused her to lose her sanity and, as such, all sales of her property in the preceding eighteen months were reviewed by the courts to confirm that the purchasers had given her a fair price and not taken advantage of Comingo's mental state. When Isabella died on July 23, 1889, her estate was divided between her living siblings. Her sister, Annie Craig Davison, was granted lots six and seven, which is where the Gallagher-Kieffer House stands today.

Annie Davison hired the firm of Bennett & Stitely to build the house in 1893, possibly as a home for her newly married daughter, Mary Davison Reed. When 234 North Dithridge Street was constructed, it was numbered 226 North Dithridge Street. The house number was changed to 234 in 1918, possibly to standardize numbering on that block. Neither Annie nor Mary lived in the house, as the 1900 census shows that they were both living at 4614 Fifth Avenue instead. Annie and Mary died in 1906 and 1908, respectively.

The Reverend Henry T. McClelland and his family were the first tenants of the Gallagher-Kieffer House, living there from 1894 until 1904 during McClelland's tenure as pastor of the Bellefield Presbyterian Church. According to the 1900 census, he and his wife, Lizona, had four children, all of whom were attending school. After the McClelland family moved to Washington, PA, the next tenants of the house were the Larkin family, who lived there from 1906 to 1911. The head of the household, Robert Larkin, was a native of Pennsylvania, worked as a clerk, and occupied the house with his four sisters. After the Larkin family moved from the Gallagher-Kieffer House, there are no known records of the tenants who may have lived in the home before it was purchased by the Gallagher family in 1914.

=== Gallagher-Kieffer Ownership ===
The long-term residents of 234 North Dithridge Street have been members of the Gallagher family. Patrick F. Gallagher and Katharine Kieffer, both natives to Pennsylvania, married in 1901 and soon after moved to Pittsburgh. Here, Patrick worked at his brother Charles’ construction business, Duquesne Construction Company, which was responsible for many prominent buildings in Pittsburgh, such as Sacred Heart Church, St. Boniface Roman Catholic Church, and St. Paul’s Cathedral Grade School, High School, Convent, and Rectory.

The couple purchased 226 (now 234) North Dithridge Street on May 14, 1914, and relocated there along with their six children. Here, they had four more children (one of whom, Philip, died seven months after being born). The 1930 census recorded eight of the ten children living at the Gallagher-Kieffer House, with two (Kathleen and Dorothy) working as schoolteachers and the rest attending school. P.F. Gallagher’s rise to prominence in the Duquesne Construction Company—eventually becoming the company’s president in 1931—is reflected in the Gallagher-Kieffer House. This is most evident in the plaster bas-relief sculpture of St. Benedict located over the dining room fireplace mantel, which served as the plaster cast for a bronze bas-relief of St. Benedict in St. Boniface Roman Catholic Church on Pittsburgh’s North Side, which the Duquesne Construction Company built. Patrick F. Gallagher died on February 19, 1938, after being struck by a hit-and-run driver, and Katherine Kieffer Gallagher died on March 7, 1952, at the age of 75. Descendants of the Gallagher-Kieffer family currently live in the house.

== Architecture ==
The Gallagher-Kieffer House exemplifies the late-nineteenth century Victorian period Shingle Style of architecture. Its steeply pitched gambrel roof, shingled second floors walls without corner boards, integral porch, and the absence of highly decorative detailing all are characteristic elements of the Shingle style. The house is unique within its Pittsburgh neighborhood, North Oakland, for this architectural style, as many other residential buildings in the area favor Richardsonian Romanesque architecture. The house also features numerous stained glass windows and panes.

== Gallery ==
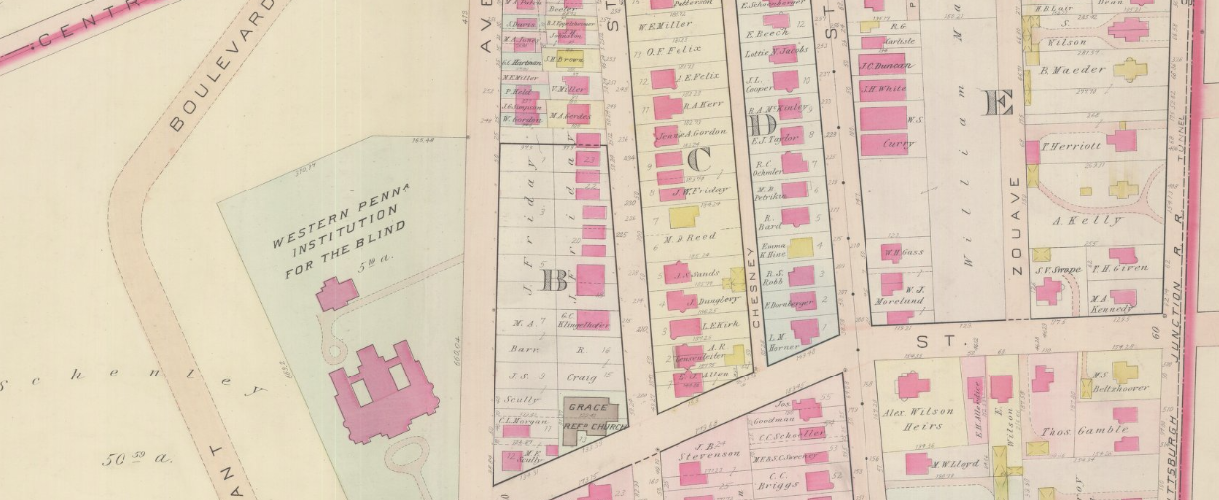
An excerpt from a 1904 plat map showing the Gallagher-Kieffer House between "M.B. Reed" and J.W. Friday.

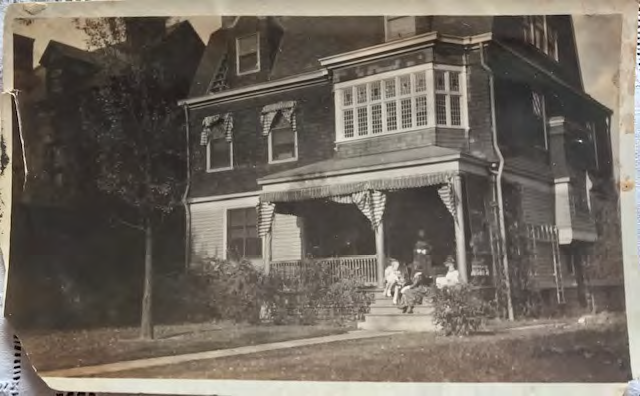
The Gallagher-Kieffer House ca. 1920.
