= 141 Mayflower Street =

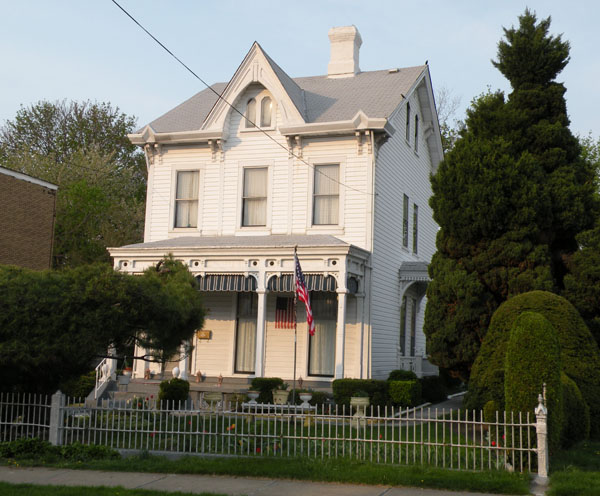

- Location within Pittsburgh
- 40°27′48.79″N 79°54′53.4″W
- Location: 141 Mayflower Street (Larimer), Pittsburgh, Pennsylvania, USA

History
- Built: circa 1885

141 Mayflower Street in the Larimer neighborhood of Pittsburgh, Pennsylvania, was built circa 1885. It was added to the List of City of Pittsburgh historic designations in June 1999.
