= South Side Presbyterian Church =

Church in Pittsburgh, Pennsylvania, USA

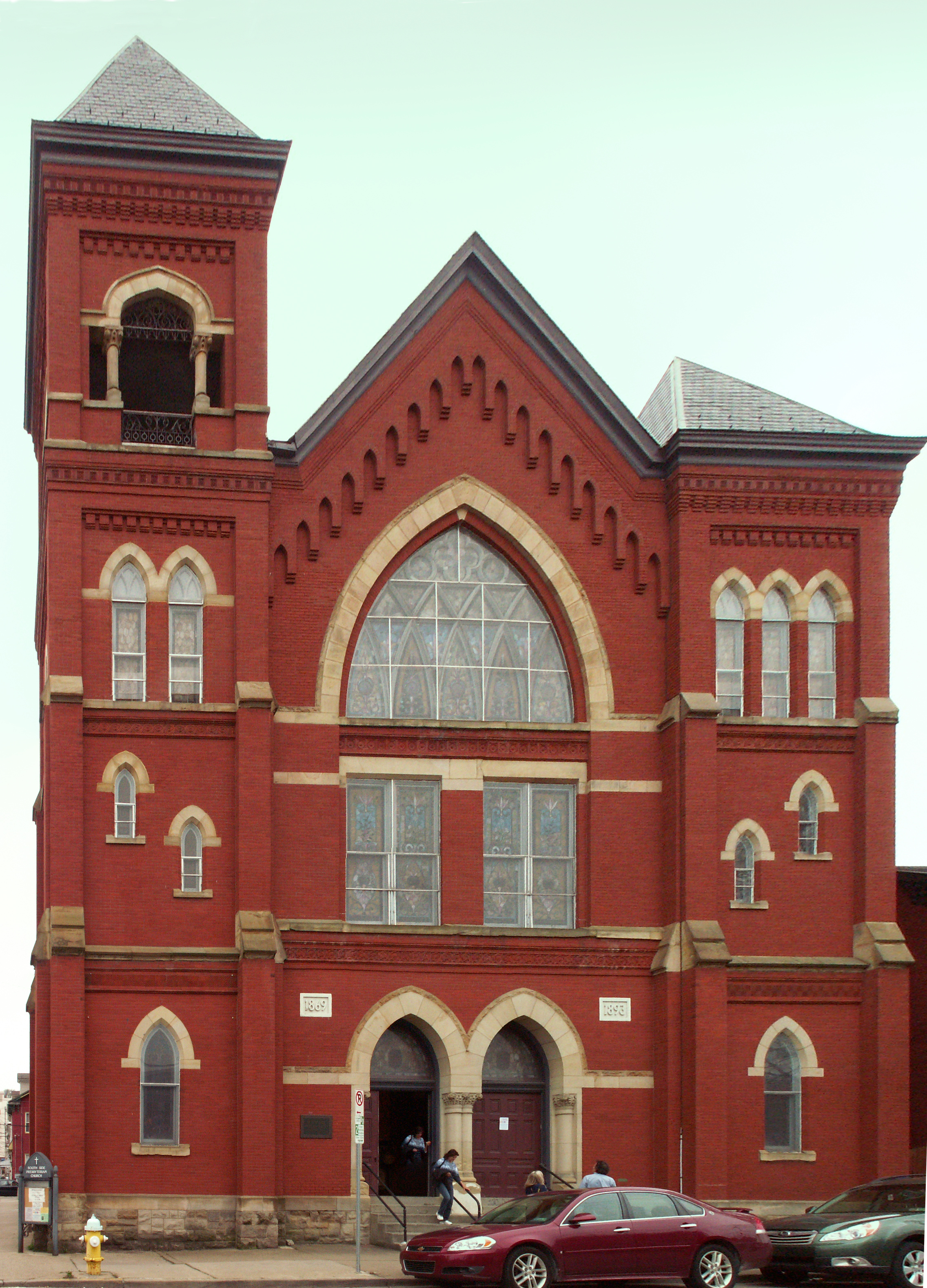
- The church in 2015

- Location within Pittsburgh
- 40°25′39″N 79°58′41″W
- Location: 1926 Sarah St. Pittsburgh, Pennsylvania

History
- Built: 1870

The South Side Presbyterian Church is an historic church in the South Side Flats neighborhood of Pittsburgh, Pennsylvania, United States. It is a designated Pittsburgh historic landmark.

== History and architectural features ==
This historic church was built between 1869 and 1870 by the First Presbyterian Church of Birmingham, a congregation established in 1851 in what was then the independent borough of Birmingham. In 1873, the name was changed to South Side Presbyterian Church after Birmingham was annexed into the city of Pittsburgh.

The original church was built by John T. Natcher and cost $30,000. In 1893, the building was expanded with a new front section including asymmetrical towers and a new main entrance. The rear of the property also includes a community center and gymnasium that were added in 1913.

This church is a two-story, brick, Gothic Revival-style building. The original section is six bays deep with Gothic arched windows on the second floor and smaller rectangular windows on the first floor. The 1893 addition added another bay to the front of the building, which includes a narthex area with a 100-foot (30 m) bell tower on the east side and a shorter 70-foot (21 m) tower on the west side.
