= Victoria Hall (Pittsburgh) =

Estate located in Pittsburgh, Pennsylvania

- Victoria Hall (Ursuline Academy)
- U.S. National Register of Historic Places
- Pittsburgh Historic Designation
- Pittsburgh Landmark – PHLF
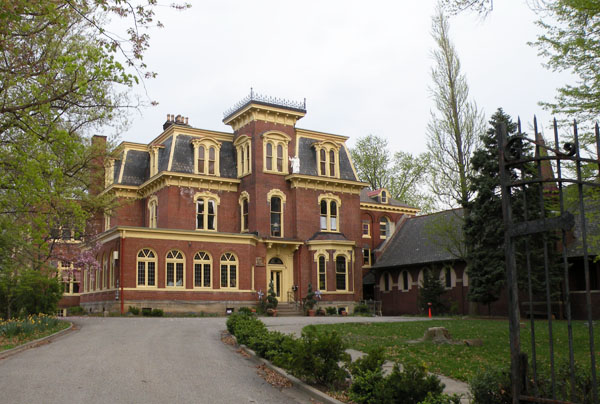
- Victoria Hall in 2010

- Location within Pittsburgh
- Location: 201 South Winebiddle Street (Bloomfield), Pittsburgh, Pennsylvania, USA
- Coordinates: 40°27′50.68″N 79°56′32.46″W
- Built: 1868
- Architectural style: Second Empire
- NRHP reference No.: 12000604

Significant dates
- Added to NRHP: September 4, 2012
- Designated CPHS: August 20, 1982
- Designated PHLF: 1984

Victoria Hall (also known as Ursuline Academy, as well as the Lynch House) at 201 South Winebiddle Street in the Bloomfield neighborhood of Pittsburgh, Pennsylvania, was built for Henry J. Lynch in the late 1860s. It was acquired by the Ursuline Sisters in 1894 and used as a Catholic girls' school, the Ursuline Academy for Young Women from 1895 to 1981. The school building was listed on the National Register of Historic Places in 2012.

== Architecture ==
The original architect of this Second Empire style house was possibly Isaac Hobbs, the architect of the Dollar Savings Bank on Fourth Avenue in Pittsburgh. Hobbs and Henry J. Lynch worked closely together when Lynch sat on the bank's board of directors from 1864 to 1906. The house was added to the List of City of Pittsburgh historic designations on August 20, 1982, and the List of Pittsburgh History and Landmarks Foundation Historic Landmarks in 1984.

The mansion has 21 rooms, stained-glass windows, 14-foot-high tin ceilings and carved corbels.

== History ==
The Ursuline Sisters raised the money to buy the building for a school in the 1890s, and then defended the school's independence against the Diocese of Pittsburgh and it Bishop Phelan. They made a number of additions to the original structure, including an auditorium/dormitory, chapel, and a dining hall. They sold the building in the early 1990s.

From 1993 until 2002, it was known as "Victoria Hall", and was a venue for weddings and parties. Currently, the building is the Waldorf School of Pittsburgh, a part of the larger Waldorf education movement.

Students in the architectural studies program at the University of Pittsburgh, led by their teacher Jeff Slack, researched and wrote the first draft of the National Register of Historic Places nomination form in 2008 and 2010.
