= Mellon National Bank Building =

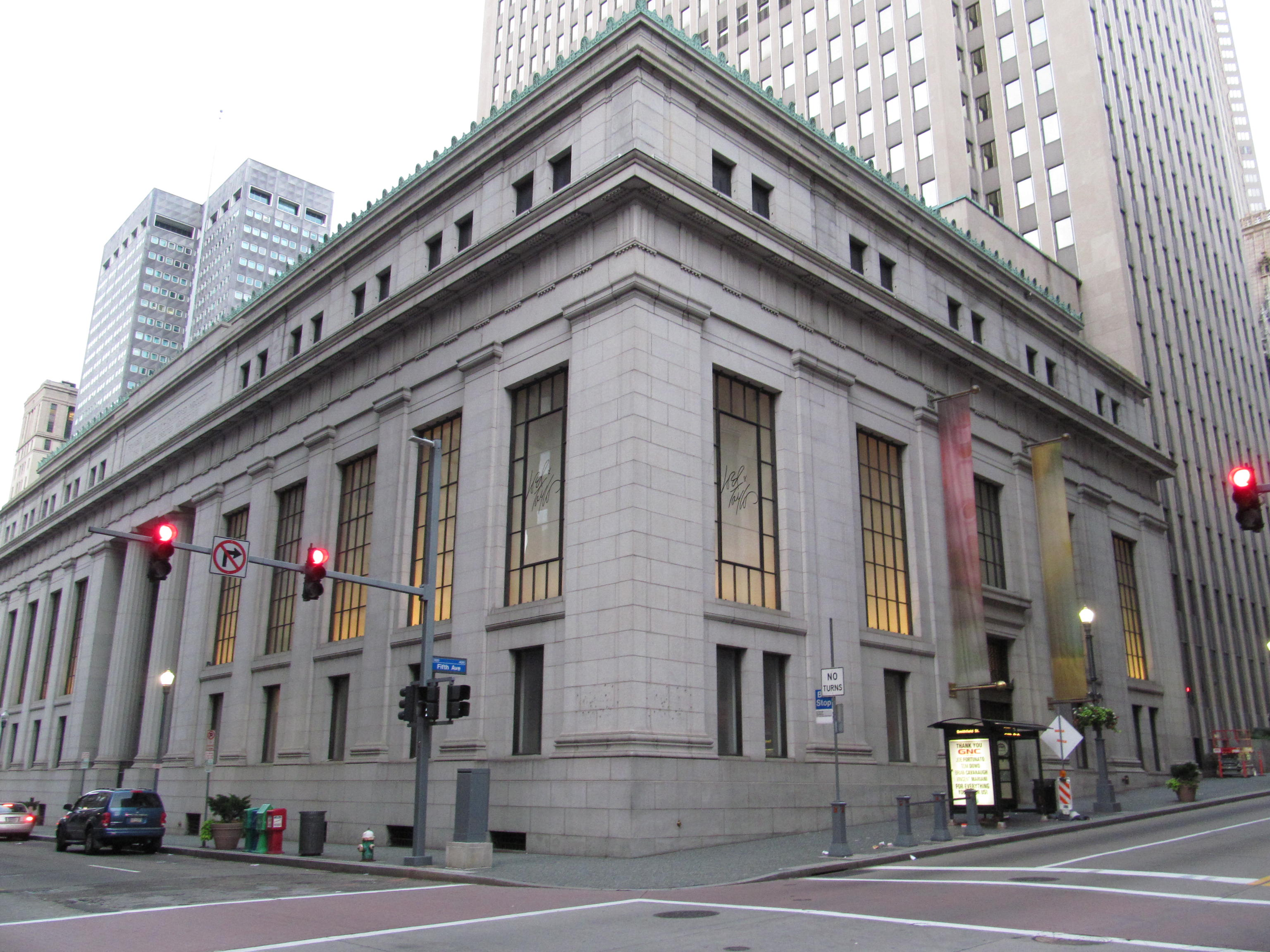

- Location within Pittsburgh
- 40°26′25.26″N 79°59′53.36″W
- Location: 500 Smithfield Street (Downtown), Pittsburgh, Pennsylvania, USA

History
- Built: 1924

The Mellon National Bank Building at 500 Smithfield Street in downtown Pittsburgh, Pennsylvania, was completed in 1924 after Mellon acquired the property in August 1916 from the Baltimore & Ohio Railroad which had their regional offices on the site.

== History and architectural features ==
Prior to the B&O office the site was the original home to the city's first public high school (Central High), which opened in the fall of 1855. The Classical-styled building was designed by architects Trowbridge & Livingston with Edward Mellon. It was added to the List of Pittsburgh History and Landmarks Foundation Historic Landmarks in 1976, and the List of City of Pittsburgh historic designations in July 1999.

On July 30, 1999, May & Co. bought the structure for $9.250 million from Mellon. The building's historic interior was gutted and converted into a department store despite the protests of historical preservationists. It opened as Lord & Taylor on November 1, 2000, after a $12 million refurbishment (22.4 million in 2025 dollars). Lord & Taylor closed just four years later, in 2004.

On May 31, 2012 PNC Financial Services purchased the structure and converted it to a call center. In 2024, PNC announced their intention to sell the building.
