= Sunnyledge =

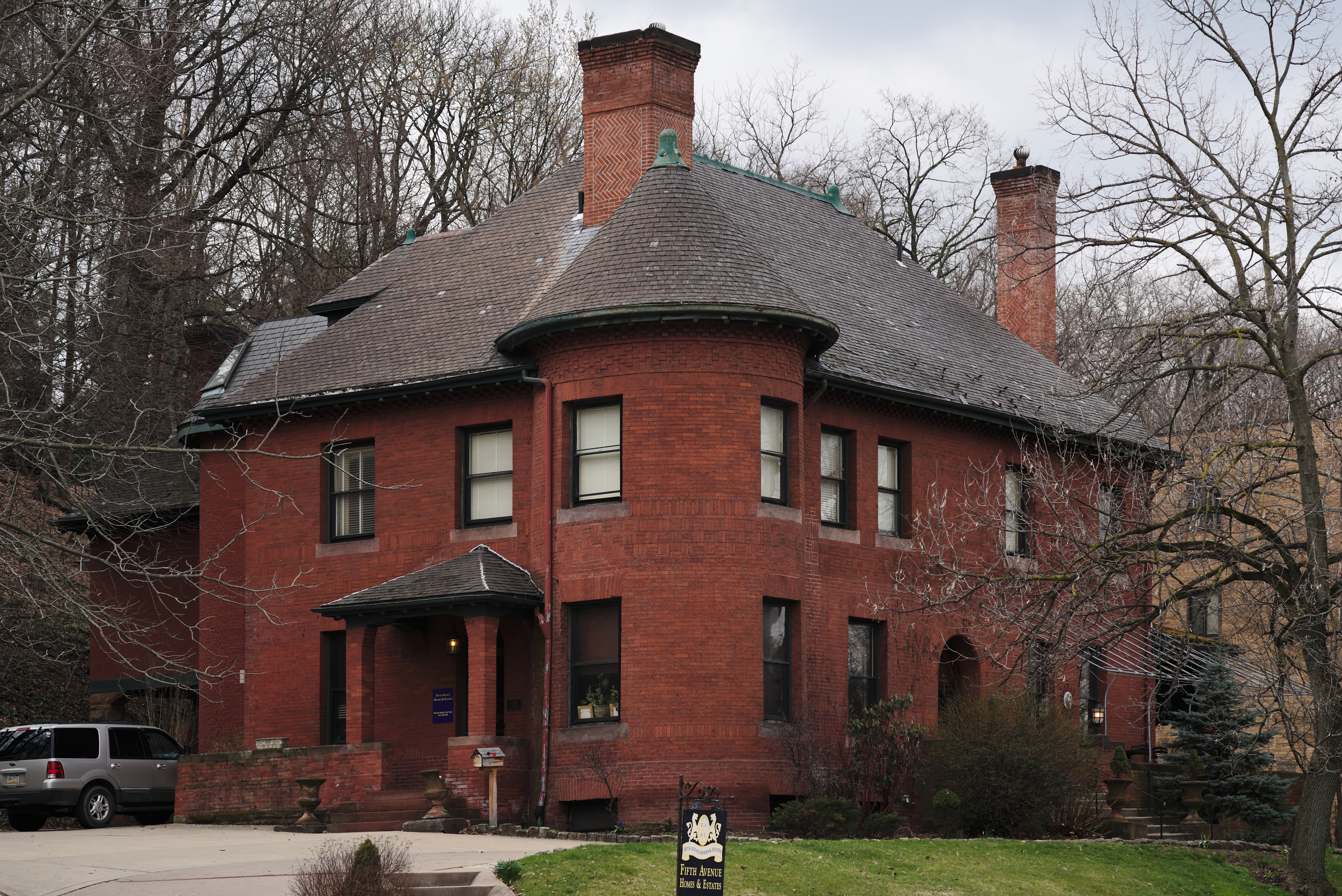

- Location within Pittsburgh
- 40°26′51.18″N 79°56′14.57″W
- Location: 5124 Fifth Avenue (Squirrel Hill North), Pittsburgh, Pennsylvania, USA

History
- Built: 1886

Sunnyledge, formerly known as the McClelland House, is an historic home that is located at 5124 Fifth Avenue in the Squirrel Hill North neighborhood of Pittsburgh, Pennsylvania, United States.

It was added to the List of City of Pittsburgh historic designations on April 12, 1995.

== History and architectral features ==
Built in 1886, the McClelland House was designed by architects Longfellow & Harlow. It was originally the home and office of Dr. James H. McClelland, the founder of nearby Shadyside Hospital, which is now part of the University of Pittsburgh. Members of the McClelland family remained residents of the home until the 1980s.

It is now known as the Sunnyledge Boutique Hotel and Tea Room. It was added to the List of City of Pittsburgh historic designations on April 12, 1995.
