= Beth Abraham Cemetery =

Historic site in Pennsylvania

- Pittsburgh Historic Designation
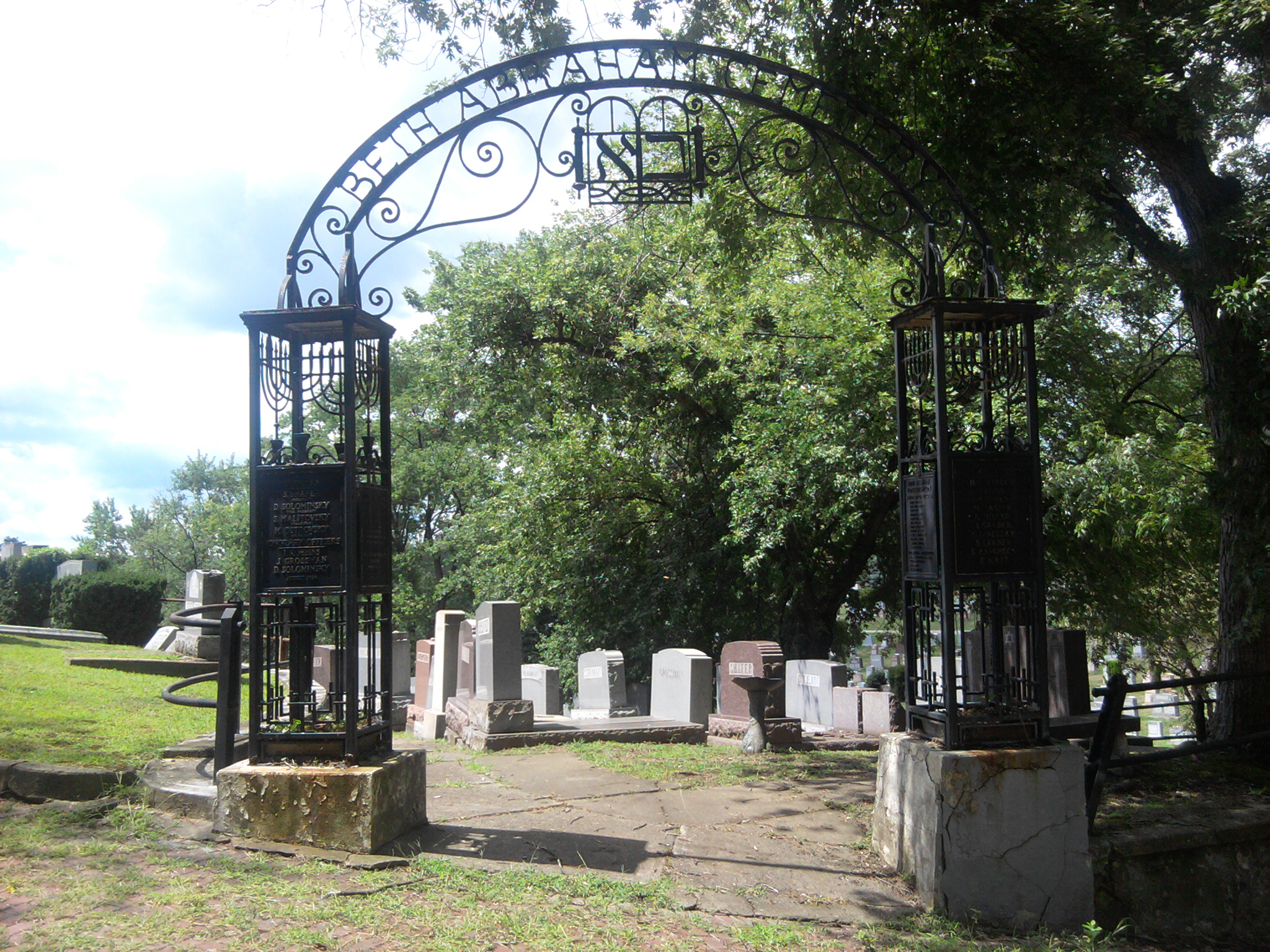
- Location: Bound by Mullally Street (S), Stewart Avenue (E), St. George's Cemetery (N), and Spinneweber Street (W), Pittsburgh, Pennsylvania, U.S.

Beth Abraham Cemetery is a historic cemetery in Carrick neighborhood of Pittsburgh, Pennsylvania. The cemetery is composed of four culturally separate but physically interconnected Jewish burial grounds: Beth Abraham, Shaare Zedeck, Marks, and Gates of Wisdom/Old Shaare. Five major ethnic groups are represented, with Lithuanian, Russian, Galitzianer, Romanian, and Polish Orthodox populations having significant visibility.

It is located in a hilly grove bound by Mullally Street (S), Stewart Avenue (E), St. George's Cemetery (N), and Spinneweber Street (W). As of May 2024, the cemetery is a Pittsburgh Landmark due to its status as the most complete record of the varying Jewish populations in Pittsburgh before the mass migration surrounding the World War II.

== History ==
Beth Abraham would begin its development in September 1891, following the private lands purchased by Shaare Torah (Sahro Torah) from Mr. and Mrs. Baumgarten. The initial four acres were marked by their hilly terrain. By 1900, Shaare Torah had divided the property into thirds; one tract was kept for the congregation, while one of the other tracts was sold to Ahave Sholem. The sale to Sholem would subsequently feature legal disputes concerning property lines and use of shared resources and structures. Legal tensions would subside in August 1918 when Ahave Sholem failed to coalesce as a congregation, and it sold its one-acre plot to Shaare Zedeck. This sale would not include dozens of already allocated plots but did allow for use of the "Ohel". One of these previously issued plots belonged to the Moskovitz/Marks family, who would spawn a separate private cemetery from this area

By 1902, the remaining two plots had been sold to Beth Abraham, a Russian congregation. These plots formed an L-shape on the periphery of the larger property that already possessed at least 20 interments dating back to 1891. During the first decade of the 20th century, the cemetery and its evolving plans of shifting plots, paths, and infrastructure would be a center of controversy for its congregation. Members of the congregation expressed issue with the formal establishment of a cemetery. In June 1918, Beth Abraham expanded prior tracts with the purchase of a northern bordering 4-acre plot owned by Mr. and Mrs. Obringer. This new plot was left undeveloped for the following 16 years in favor of selling off portions of the older property. Two expansion efforts would be mounted to develop the northern addition; the first in 1934 involved the marking of 112 plots divided by walkways and terracing (accompanied by a main stairwell with concrete relief decor of a menorah and the Star of David) and fronted by a combination gate/chapel designed by prolific synagogue designer Alexander Sharove. The chapel, a blonde two-story and wing structure, would be demolished in 2019.

All additions and landscaping occurred under the direction of lead contractor and later the director of the cemetery, Harry Lebovitz. The cemetery expansion efforts favored Jewish contractors and suppliers, Morris Broido/Center Lumber Company, and Emil L. Habers/Standard Mantel & Center Lumber Company. These expansions also introduced a gated entrance from Stewart Avenue that would subsequently become the cemetery's main throughway following the demolition of the earlier eastern entrance. Areas north of this new entrance road would be developed in the 1940s, doubling the capacity. Following the 1951 announcement of 6 new expansions, the cemetery would receive wider spacing and natural walkways. The latter half of the 20th century would see the cemetery through a series of infrastructural improvements and the installation of a small Holocaust Memorial outside the 1950 gate. In 2023, the Jewish Cemetery and Burial Association assumed ownership and operations of the entire Beth Abraham Cemetery

== Landscape design ==
The cemetery's varying design throughlines also feature the influence of orthodox religious practices; save for its presence within city limits, a trait lying outside of tradition. The primary entrance along Stewart Avenue has its importance established via a monolithic, wrought iron gate. This gate is topped with the interlaced forms of a menorah, Star of David, and the Beth Abraham moniker written in both English and Hebrew; this ironwork has subsequently been removed. The gate's stone body is decorated with five plaques dedicated to directors, officers, and families associated with the cemetery.

The red brick street sprouting from this entry point serves as the central axis and lowest point of the cemetery. The road terminates in a loop at the tree line division of Beth Abraham and the neighboring St. George Cemetery. The loop sprouts smaller auxiliary paths leading through the older portions of the cemetery. The new and old cemeteries are visually distinct with their differences in grave spacing/orientation and uniformity. The first generation of tombstones had designs adapted from Eastern European tastes: tall and tightly packed headstones made of concrete and decorated with traditional imagery/blessings as well as Hebrew lettering. The second generation featured diminished density in tomb placement, which showcased diminished Hebrew and esoteric symbols in favor of English and broad emblems such as the commandments. The third generation is fully Americanized with a move from the rectilinear to the curved while still retaining the details of the prior generation. The slabs present over the first-generation graves have also disappeared
