= Calvary United Methodist Church =

Calvary United Church
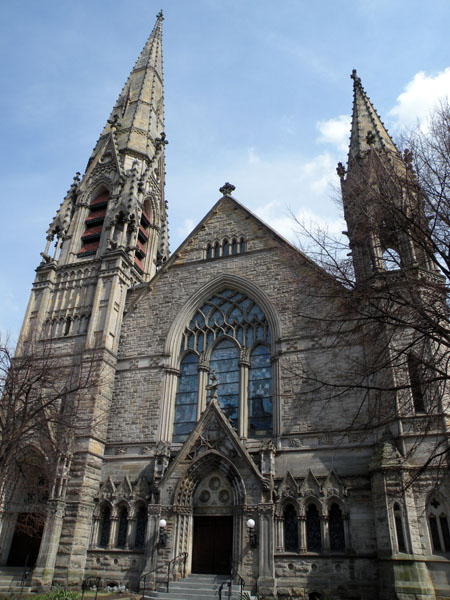

- Location within Pittsburgh
- 40.4521444°N 80.0188389°W
- Location: 971 Beech Avenue (Allegheny West), Pittsburgh, Pennsylvania
- Country: United States
- Denomination: Methodism

History
- Founded: 1895

Pittsburgh Historic Designation
- Type: Historic structure
- Designated: February 22, 1977

Pittsburgh Landmark – PHLF
- Designated: 1972

Calvary United Methodist Church at 971 Beech Avenue in the Allegheny West neighborhood of Pittsburgh, Pennsylvania, was built from 1892 to 1895. This Gothic Revival styled Methodist church was designed by architects Vrydaugh and Shepherd, with T. B. Wolfe. It was added to the List of Pittsburgh History and Landmarks Foundation Historic Landmarks in 1972, and the List of City of Pittsburgh historic designations on February 22, 1977.
