= Voegtly Spring =

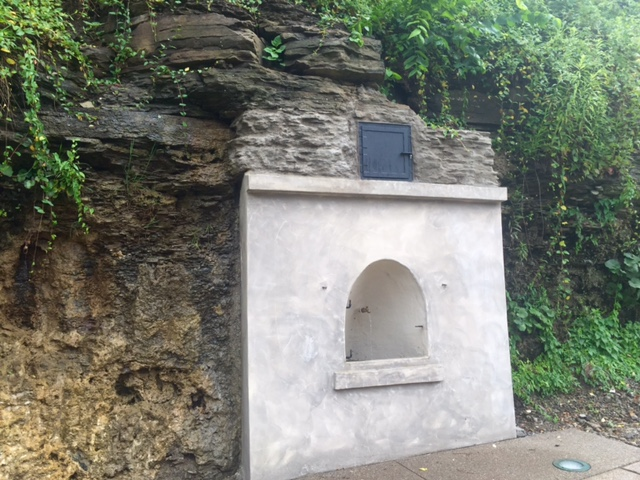

- Location within Pittsburgh
- 40°27′56.46″N 79°59′28.22″W
- Location: Damas Street, Spring Hill, Pittsburgh, Pennsylvania, USA

History
- Built: 1912

Site notes
- Governing body: City of Pittsburgh

The Voegtly Spring is located on Damas Street in the Spring Hill neighborhood of Pittsburgh, Pennsylvania. The structure around the spring was built circa 1912 in the Vernacular architectural style.

== History ==
The land on which the spring sits was purchased by the Voegtly family from William Robinson Jr., the first mayor of Allegheny City, in 1864. The land around the area was continuously owned by members and descendants of the Voegtly family, aside from certain small portions being sold, for the next few decades. This remained the case until John Voegtly died without heirs, and left the portion of the property that housed the spring to his sister, Sarah V. Crone. Sarah maintained the property until her death in the 1930s, when she stipulated that her estate should be divided between the Tuberculosis Hospital of Pittsburgh at Leech Farm and the Allegheny Association for the Improvement of the Poor. By the time of her death though, the two groups had become owned by the City of Pittsburgh and the Family Welfare Association of Allegheny County, so the remaining heirs made an agreement with the two parties to have the properties transferred back to the Voegtly family in return for a fee paid to each agency. The spring would remain in the hands of the Voegtly family until it was eventually purchased by the City of Pittsburgh. It was members of the Voegtly family though that channeled the spring and maintained it. The first recording of the spring was from maps of Allegheny City in 1882 which record a stream running down Spring Hill. The Voegtly family opened the spring for public access for nearly fifty years before a structure was built around it. Despite the fact that the land was owned by the Voegtly family, it was actually the City that built the structure around the spring. Following a petition by members of the community, the City formally asked permission from the Voegtly family to build a permanent catch basin for the spring, which was granted in 1912. The spring continued to provide a valuable source of water to the community for the following years. Given the geography of the Spring Hill neighborhood, it was difficult for the houses at the top of the hill to have consistent sources of water. This led to the prevalence, and importance, of natural spring water in the area, which is what gave the neighborhood its name. The spring was particularly invaluable during the 1936 “St. Patrick’s Day Flood” which caused significant damage to the city's water and led to a decrease in the availability of drinking water. During this time local businesses, hospitals, and residents turned to the springs for their water. Voegtly Spring remained operational up until the early 1950s. However, due to construction of houses above the spring, the water became tainted and by the late 1950s the spring was cemented shut. This remained the case until mid-2016 when the spring was renovated and reopened to the public for drinking by city officials. The spring was nominated in January 2016 to become a City Historic Landmark by Preservation Pittsburgh.

== Architecture ==
The structure around the spring was originally done in the vernacular architectural style. Vernacular architecture is considered to be architecture based on local construction reflecting local needs without using formally-schooled architects, but rather design skills of local builders. This is the case with Voegtly Spring, as the bottom of the structure is entirely concrete, and the top a mixture of cement and rocks from the hillside. The spring is the only remaining spring in Pittsburgh, of the three left, that does not adhere to any particular design style.

== Gallery ==
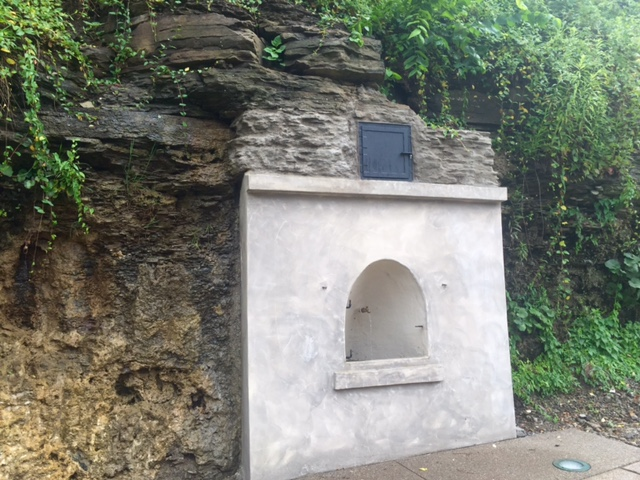
Photo of the spring after the most recent renovations

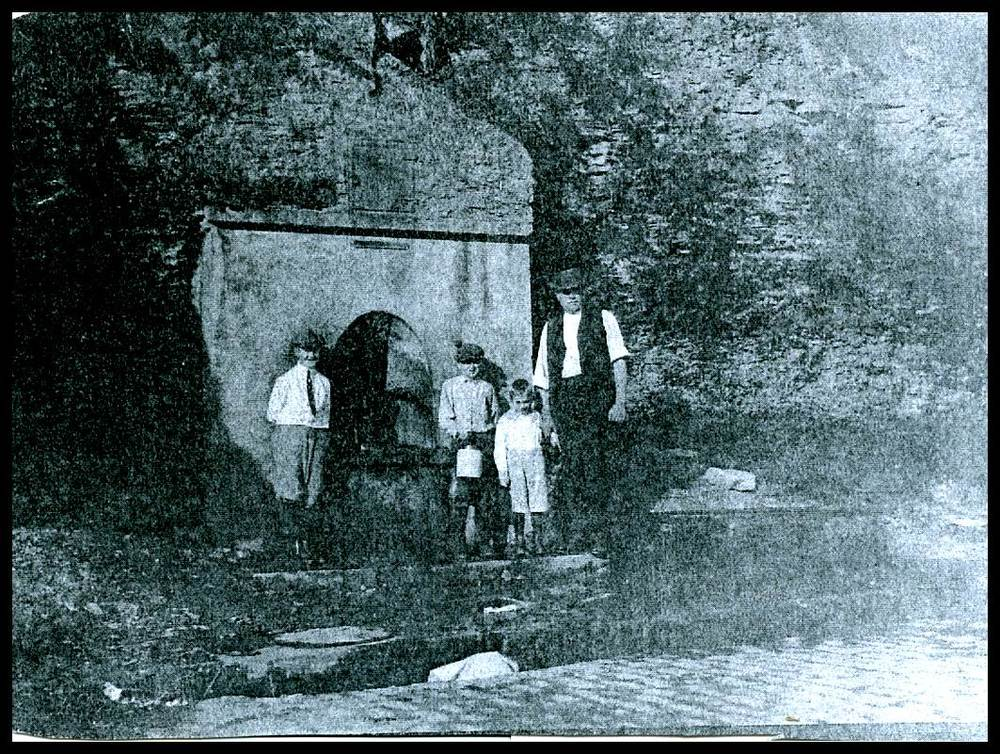
Older photo of family getting water from the spring
