= Shrine of the Blessed Mother =

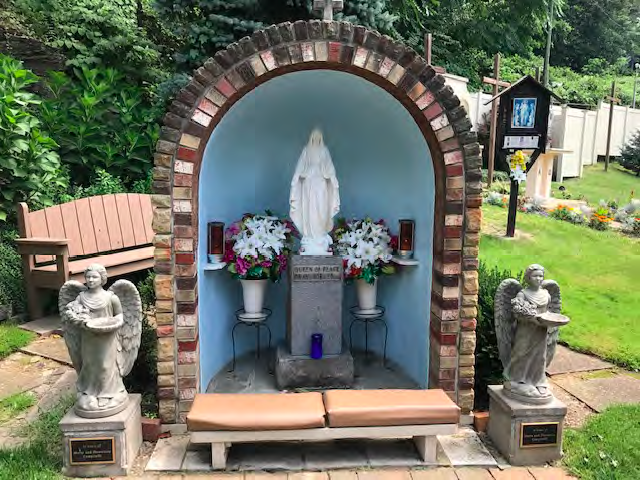
- The Shrine of the Blessed Mother in 2017

- Location within Pittsburgh
- 40°25′53″N 79°57′28″W
- Location: 6 Wakefield Street, Pittsburgh, Pennsylvania, USA

History
- Built: 1956

The Shrine of the Blessed Mother, also known as Our Lady of the Parkway and the Queen of Peace, is located at 6 Wakefield Street in the Oakland neighborhood of Pittsburgh, Pennsylvania. The shrine overlooks the Penn-Lincoln Parkway (I-376). Built in the Vernacular style, the shrine historically and currently acts as a place of worship for Catholic worshippers. In March 2020, Preservation Pittsburgh nominated the site for City of Pittsburgh Historic Landmark status. Pittsburgh City Council voted to designate the Shrine of the Blessed Mother as a historic structure on October 6, 2020.

== History ==
The Shrine of the Blessed Mother was first created in 1956, and the earliest report of the shrine’s creation can be traced to a Pittsburgh Sun-Telegraph article from September 1956. This article identifies Anna Cybak from Ambridge as having created the shrine to honor her army infantry son, Paul Cybak, who died in 1944 while fighting in Saipan. The 1956 article also claimed that Anna was inspired to create the shrine after the Virgin Mary, the Catholic holy figure depicted in the shrine, visited her in a dream.

Another article about the shrine, written in 1957 in The Pittsburgh Press, also identifies Cybak as one of the creators of the site along with a woman named Sophie Toma. After Toma’s house on Wakefield Street was razed for the creation of the Penn-Lincoln Parkway, she kept ownership over an undeveloped plot of land that would eventually be where the shrine was built. According to the 1956 Sun-Telegraph article, Anna Cybak and Sophie Toma, along with their friend Mary Sunyoga (and her son, Steve), were the ones who cleared the lot and erected the statue.

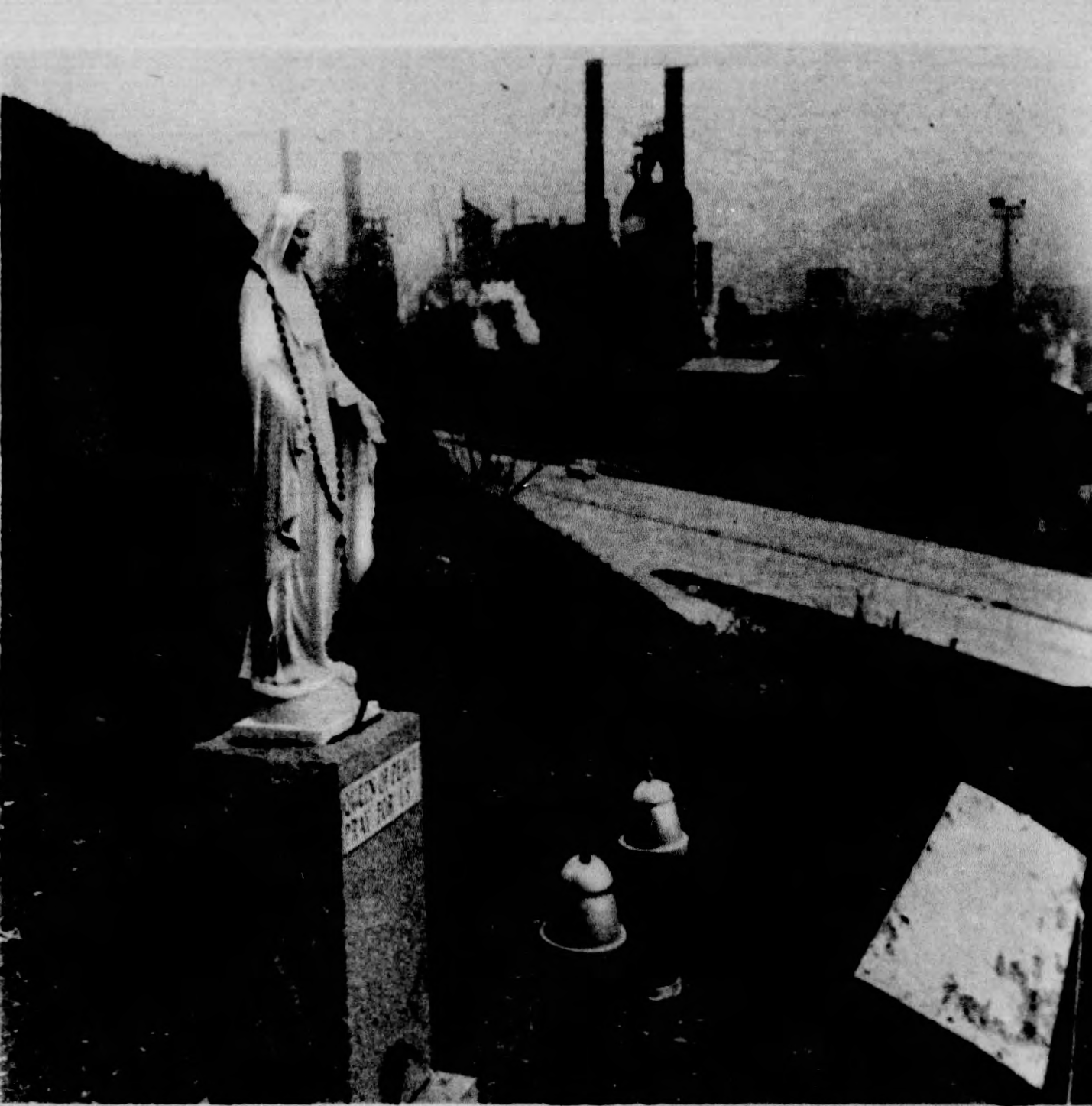
'Madonna on the Hill' on April 21, 1957

A man named Philip Marraway is also purported to be involved with the shrine’s founding, as an unattributed document posted at the site details his account of being inspired to create the shrine. This document states that on his walk home from work one night, Marraway saw a light beckoning him from the hillside above the parkway. He claimed to have followed the source of light and discovered that it came from an image of the Virgin Mary. When he returned to the site the next day, he declared that he saw the image again and also arrived at the site at the same time as Sophie Toma. The account claims that the two concluded that their meeting was divinely inspired and agreed to work together to erect the statue of the Virgin Mary.

The small spring at the site also factors in some accounts of the shrine’s founding. One, a ThePittNews 2008 article, claims that the presence of the spring told Marraway and Toma where to place the statue, since they carried it through the site until they became stuck in the mud. This article also includes the “legend” that the spring miraculously appeared after visitors to the shrine prayed for water to tend to the flowers. Another article, featured in The Morning Call in 2004, lays out the idea that the spring began flowing from the rock when Josephine DeNardo, an early visitor, brought flowers to the shrine.

In the early 2000s, the shrine came under threat from the Pennsylvania Turnpike Commission’s plans to build the Mon-Fayette Parkway, which would remove much of the cliff side, including the shrine site. The plan to extend the parkway into downtown Pittsburgh was eventually abandoned, and the Shrine of the Blessed Mother still stands today. A 2019 KDKA 2 CBS Pittsburgh article stated that a non-profit group led by Francis Caiazza, a formal federal magistrate, was attempting to buy the site in order to preserve it.

== Architecture ==
Because the shrine was erected by local residents of Pittsburgh, it is of the Vernacular architectural style, which relies upon the resources available in the location and local builders as opposed to formally trained architects. The shrine’s accompanying votives and small statutory added to the site after its 1956 construction are visually similar to grotto shrines common in France, Italy, and Turkey, as well as throughout the Mediterranean. Likewise, the wooden posts containing prayer cards devoted to Jesus and information about the shrine have cultural and stylistic similarities with wayside shrines prevalent in Germany, Austria, and Poland.
