= Beck's Run School =

Beck's Run School (Dower's Tavern)
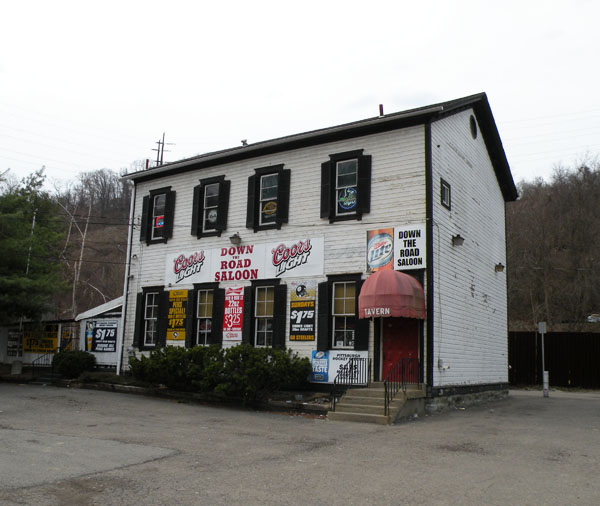

- Location within Pittsburgh
- 40°24′39.28″N 79°57′25.39″W
- Location: 1000 Beck's Run Road (Arlington Heights), Pittsburgh, Pennsylvania, USA

History
- Built: 1899

Beck's Run School (also known as Dower's Tavern) is a former elementary school and historic building located at 1000 Becks Run Road in the Arlington Heights neighborhood of Pittsburgh, Pennsylvania. It was built in 1899. This former two story and two room school house was used almost up until World War II. It later became known as Dower's Tavern (currently "Down the Road Saloon"). It was added to the List of City of Pittsburgh historic designations on September 28, 1987.
