= King Estate (Pittsburgh) =

Estate located in Pittsburgh, Pennsylvania

- King Estate (Baywood)
- U.S. Historic district – Contributing property
- Pittsburgh Historic Designation
- Pittsburgh Landmark – PHLF
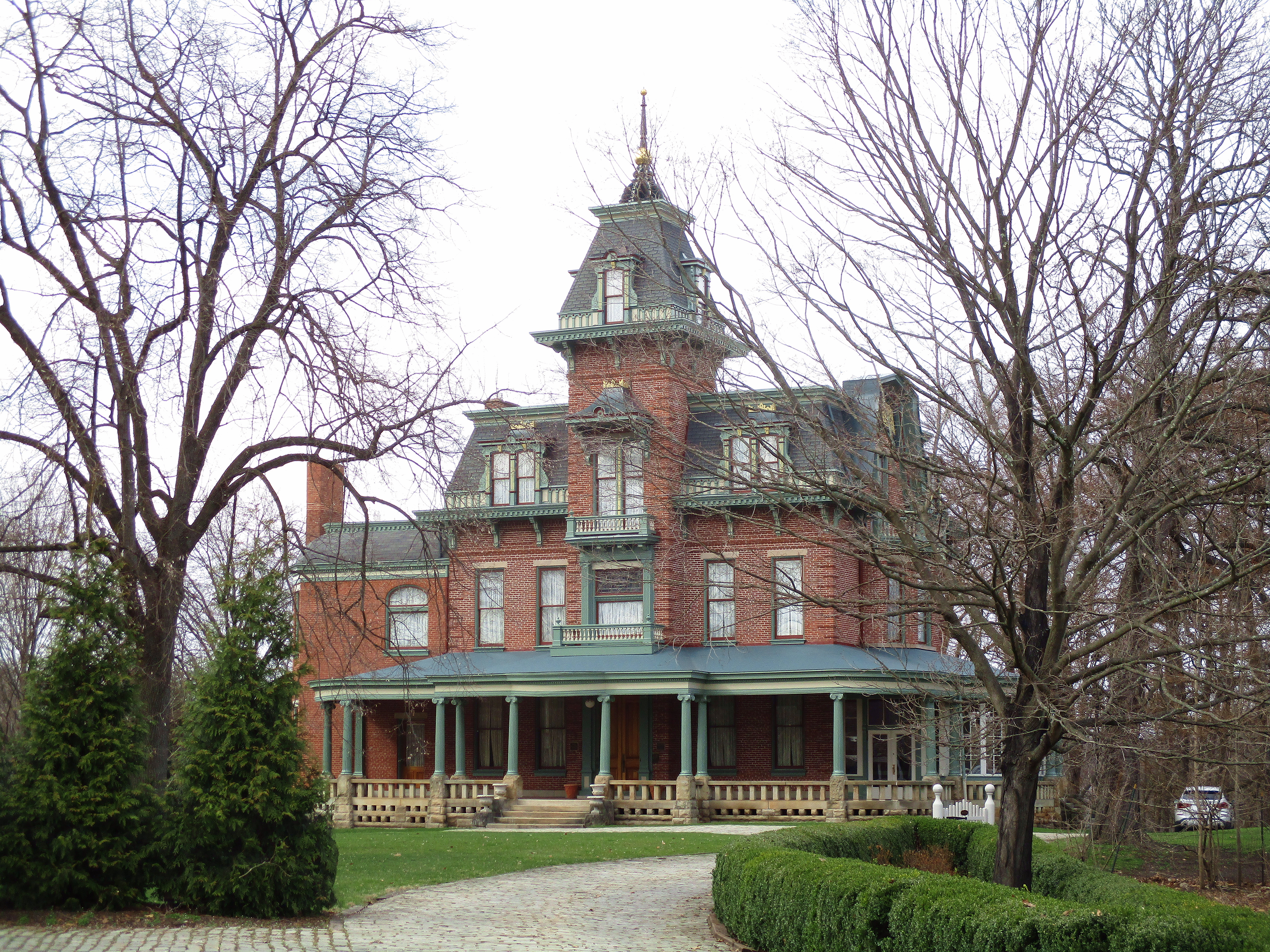
- King Estate in 2022

- Location within Pittsburgh
- Location: 5501 Elgin Street (Highland Park), Pittsburgh, Pennsylvania, USA
- Coordinates: 40°28′45.43″N 79°55′29.53″W
- Built: 1880
- Architectural style: Second Empire
- Part of: Highland Park Residential Historic District (ID07000888)

Significant dates
- Designated CP: August 30, 2007
- Designated CPHS: November 12, 1992
- Designated PHLF: 2000

The King Estate (also known as Baywood, or the Alexander King Estate, or the King Mansion) is located at 5501 Elgin Street in the Highland Park neighborhood of Pittsburgh, Pennsylvania.

== History and architectural features ==
Built in 1880, Alexander King was the original owner of this Second Empire style house. It was added to the List of City of Pittsburgh historic designations on November 12, 1992, and the List of Pittsburgh History and Landmarks Foundation Historic Landmarks in 2000.
