= John Wesley A.M.E. Zion Church (Pittsburgh) =

Church in Pittsburgh, Pennsylvania, USA

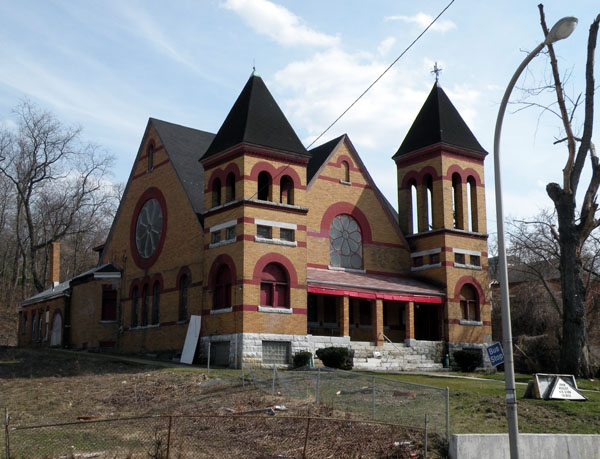

- Location within Pittsburgh
- 40°27′2.88″N 79°57′52.2″W
- Location: 594 Herron Avenue (Upper Hill), Pittsburgh, Pennsylvania, USA

History
- Built: 1894

John Wesley A.M.E. Zion Church is a historic African American church in the Hill District of Pittsburgh, Pennsylvania. The church, which is one of Pittsburgh's oldest African American faith-based organizations, was founded in 1836 following a series of prayer meetings and preaching services.

On October 11, 1993, the church received City of Pittsburgh Historic Designation as a local landmark. However, in the following year the congregation was forced to temporarily abandon the church property following flooding that was created by waters from an abandoned 100-acre (40 ha) mine that ran below the church. In 2006, the church again faced flooding from the mine water, and the Pennsylvania Department of Environmental Protection (DEP) installed new piping to divert the mine water from the church. At the DEP's suggestion, a geothermal system was installed in November 2008 that used the runoff from the mine water to provide heating and cooling for the church building.
