= Spring Hill Elementary School =

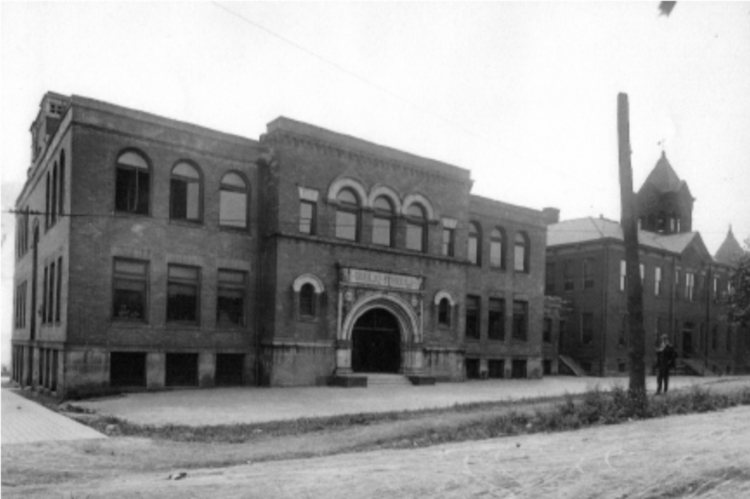

- Location within Pittsburgh
- 40°27′54.62″N 79°59′22.10″W
- Location: 1351 Damas Street (Spring Hill (Pittsburgh)), Pittsburgh, Pennsylvania, USA

History
- Built: 1896

Site notes
- Area: Spring Hill
- Architect: Marion Steen
- Governing body: Pittsburgh Public Schools

The Spring Hill Elementary School (also known as Pittsburgh Spring Hill K-5) is a public elementary school and historic building located at 1351 Damas Street in the Spring Hill neighborhood of Pittsburgh, Pennsylvania. The building was first constructed in 1896 in the Classical Revival style and serves as the elementary school for residents of the Spring Hill area.

== History ==
The current school was originally constructed as the Seventh Ward Public School and designed by architect Joseph Stillburg in the then Allegheny City. The neighborhood of Spring Hill was settled predominantly by German immigrants, one of whom, Damas Lutz owned the land on what is now Damas Street, and he was the one to sell the land for the original construction of the two-story brick school. In 1907 Allegheny City was annexed into the City of Pittsburgh which resulted in a shift of boundaries and wards. This effected the Spring Hill area and by 1925 the school became known as the Spring Hill Elementary School after the area in which it was based. Also with the annexation into the City of Pittsburgh, there was a substantial two-story addition added to the school in 1908, doubling its size. The building remained the same until substantial alterations occurred in 1936. These changes were known as the Federal Public Works Project Docket PA 1156 due to the fact that the Pittsburgh School Board's building staff and program were funded by the federal government at this time due to the Great Depression. The architect for these 1936 renovations was Marion Steen, the Pittsburgh School Board's staff architect and Assistant Superintendent of Buildings at the time. These renovations modernized the interior and significantly altered the exterior which has remained the same till this day. The last changes occurred in 1991 when the architecture firms of Akers, Erwin, Thompson, and Gasparella made extensive renovations to the interior, modernizing it. The building was nominated in 2018 to become a City Historic Landmark by Preservation Pittsburgh.

== Architecture ==
The architecture of the Spring Hill Elementary School is most notable for how it reflects the history of public school design in Allegheny and Pittsburgh. The alterations to the school are illustrative of the changes in ideological and architectural approaches to urban education. The first school building was designed by the City of Allegheny and was representative of typical Victorian schoolhouses of the era. The annexation into Pittsburgh shifted the school from being a symbol of the community to part of the city. The changes in the 1930s also represented an era in which the federal government was needed for improvements, and the school needed modernizing. Today the school consists of two-wings, one of which was first constructed in 1896 and the other in 1908. The wings are joined by a one-story connector and are rectangular, made of red brick and sandstone foundations.

== Gallery ==
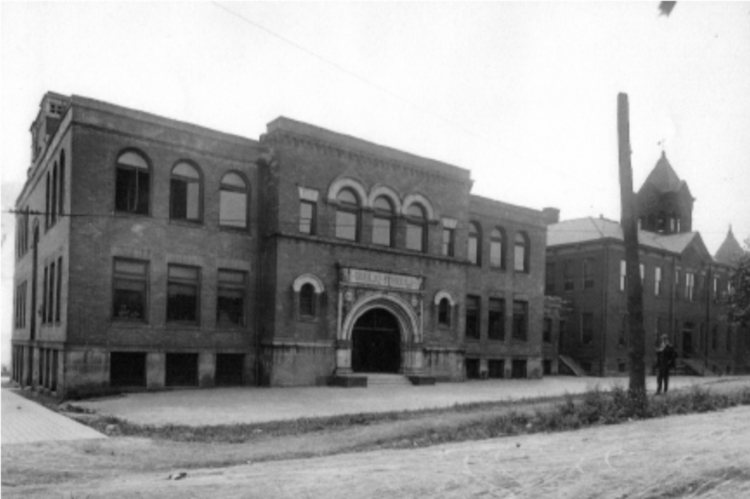
View of the Elementary School in 1917
