= Pittsburgh Produce Terminal =

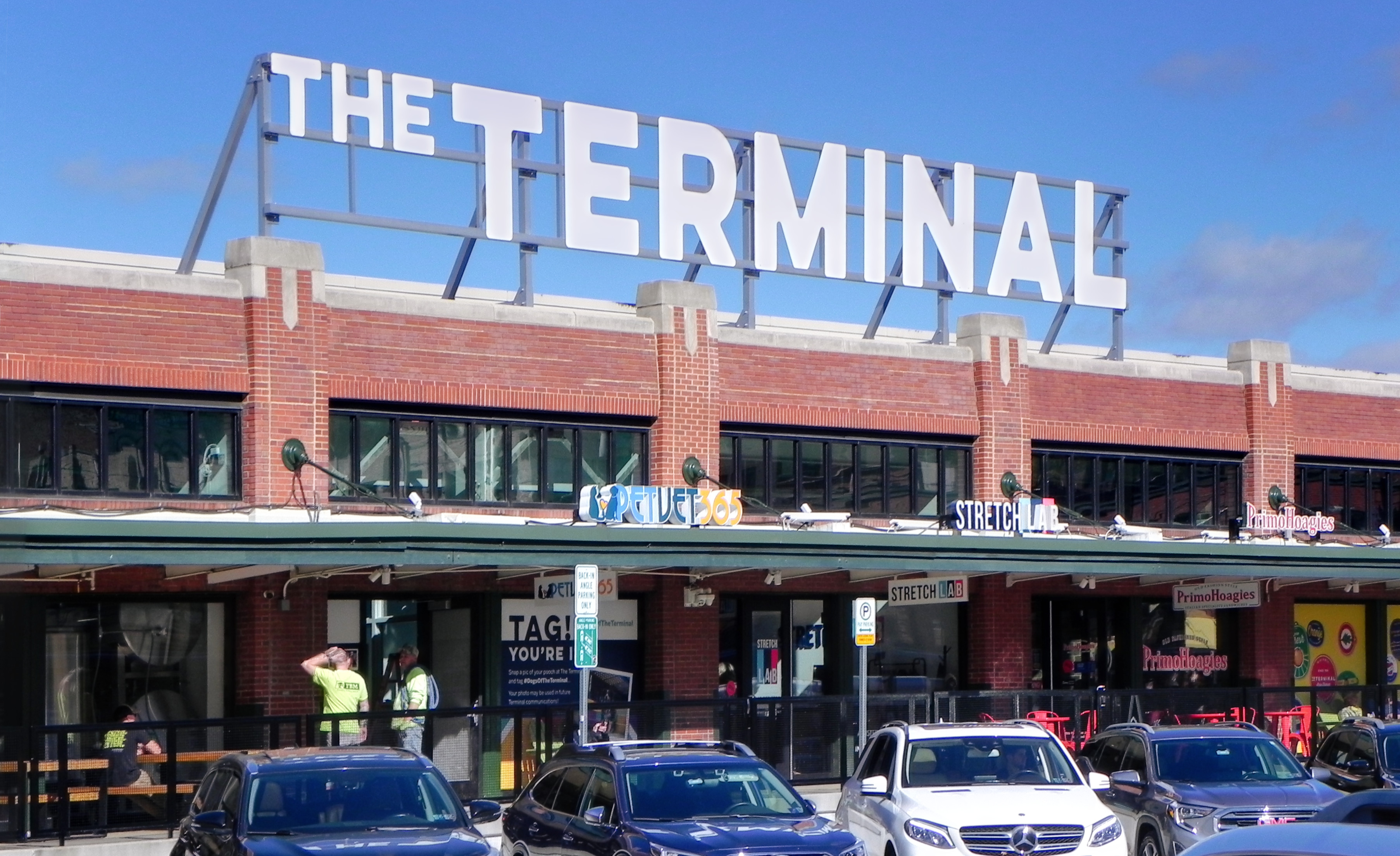

- Location within Pittsburgh
- 40°27′7.89″N 79°59′4.46″W
- Location: 2100 Smallman Street, Pittsburgh, Pennsylvania, USA

History
- Built: 1926

Site notes
- Area: Strip District
- Governing body: Urban Redevelopment Authority

The Terminal, also known as the Strip District Terminal, the Pittsburgh Produce Terminal and formerly the Pennsylvania Fruit Auction & Sales Building, is a building located at 2100 Smallman Street in the Strip District neighborhood of Pittsburgh, Pennsylvania. Built in 1926, the Produce Terminal stretches 1,533 feet long over five blocks. It previously served as the hub for local wholesale produce businesses, as well as retail markets and art galleries. After years of sitting partially vacant, the building underwent a $62.6 million renovation by McCaffery Interests.

== History ==
At the start of the 20th century as the iron metals industry slowly declined in Pittsburgh's Strip District, the produce industry experienced significant growth. In 1906 the rail lines were removed from Liberty Avenue in downtown Pittsburgh, and wholesale produce businesses were relocating elsewhere, and the Pittsburgh Produce Terminal was constructed to meet these new needs. Before 1900 the area of the site was a residential district known as Bayardstown, but this district was slowly transformed into warehouses for the Pennsylvania Railroad yards. In 1903 the auctions for the produce was conducted straight from the freight cars. This began to change as the fruit dealers became more organized, creating United Fruit Action in 1908. In 1926 Joseph Craig, who worked for the Pennsylvania Railroad, constructed all of the linear warehouses that displayed samples of incoming produce, and build the extant structure of the Pennsylvania Fruit Auction & Sales Building. Auctions were held at multiple points in this new structure, which was designed to maximize access to rail cars and the auctioning of produce. The wholesalers business was hurt by the Great Depression, the 1936 Flood, and World War II. Yet there were still 71 produce wholesalers in the Strip District in the 1950s. The decline continued still though as the growth of supermarket chains, direct purchasing, and shipping by truck all hurt the industry.

In 1962 Mayor Joe Barr, along with the USDA, issued a report on the facilities in the Strip District and proposed creating a new facility in the suburbs. Following this, and the bankruptcy of Penn Central in 1970, the building was sold to Conrail. The Buncher Company then bought most of the lands, and sold them to the Urban Redevelopment Authority in 1981. The URA then invested $2.5 million in rehabilitating and modifying the north façade of the building to accommodate trucking docks. However, by the mid-2000s, the terminal was no longer being used due to changes in the produce industry. In 2019, the URA reached a deal with Chicago-based McCaffery Interests to renovate the Produce Terminal into a food market and space for local businesses. Ground was broken on the project in June 2019; it is expected to cost approximately $50 million. The building was nominated in January 2013 to become a City Historic Landmark by Preservation Pittsburgh.

== Architecture ==
The Produce Terminal was built in the Art Deco and Moderne architectural styles. The building is unique in that it is the last remaining structure designed to optimize access to Pennsylvania Railroad Freight yards. This is responsible for the building being 1,533 feet long, or just over ¼ mile, so as to allow for the unloading of freight trains all along its length. The building is 155,000 square feet, and consists of 75 twenty-one foot by one hundred foot structural bays, meant for unloading and selling of merchandise. The structure itself is made primarily of a steel frame with brick masonry contrasting with stone caps.

== Gallery ==
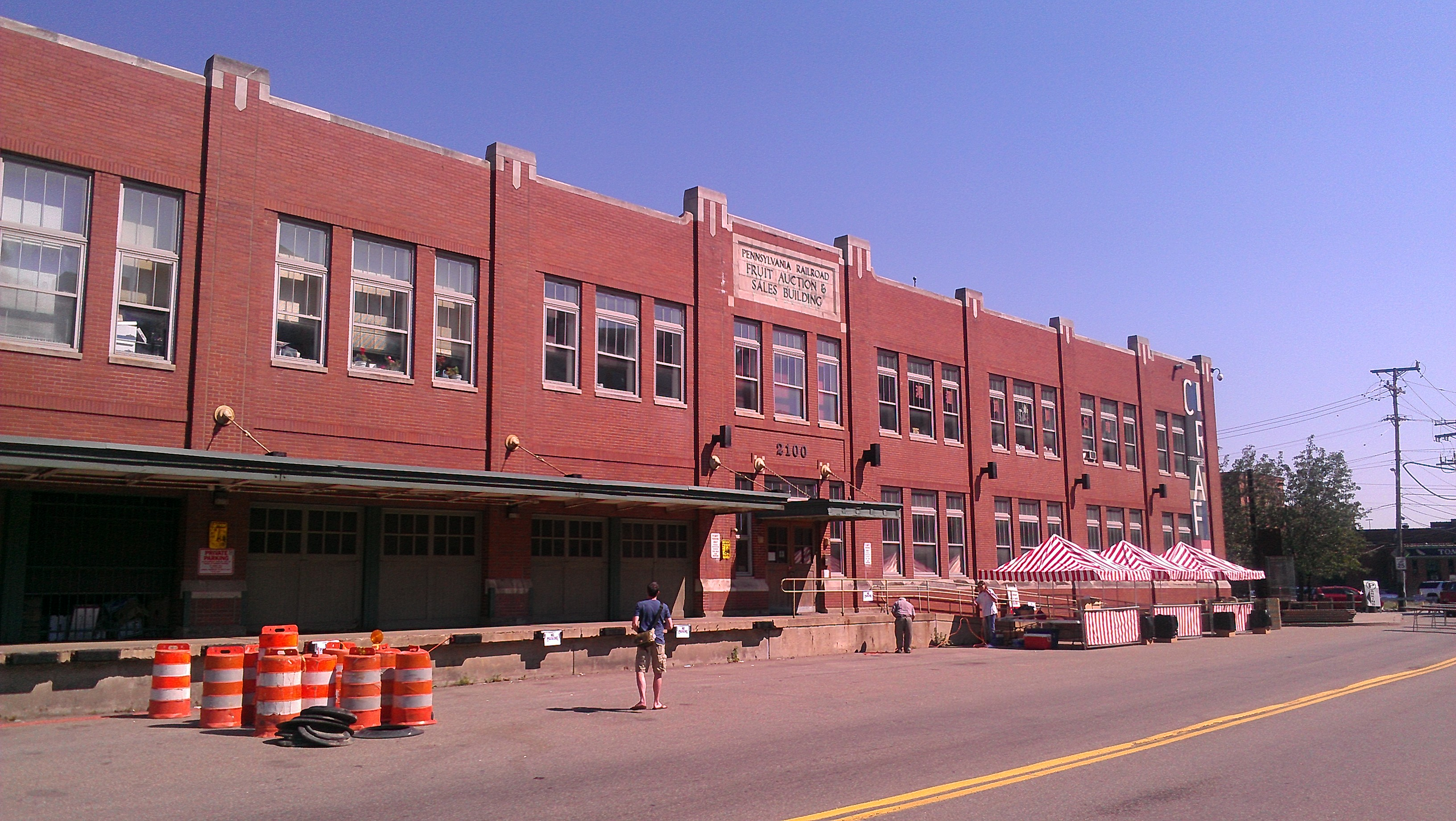
Front facade of the building as it stands today

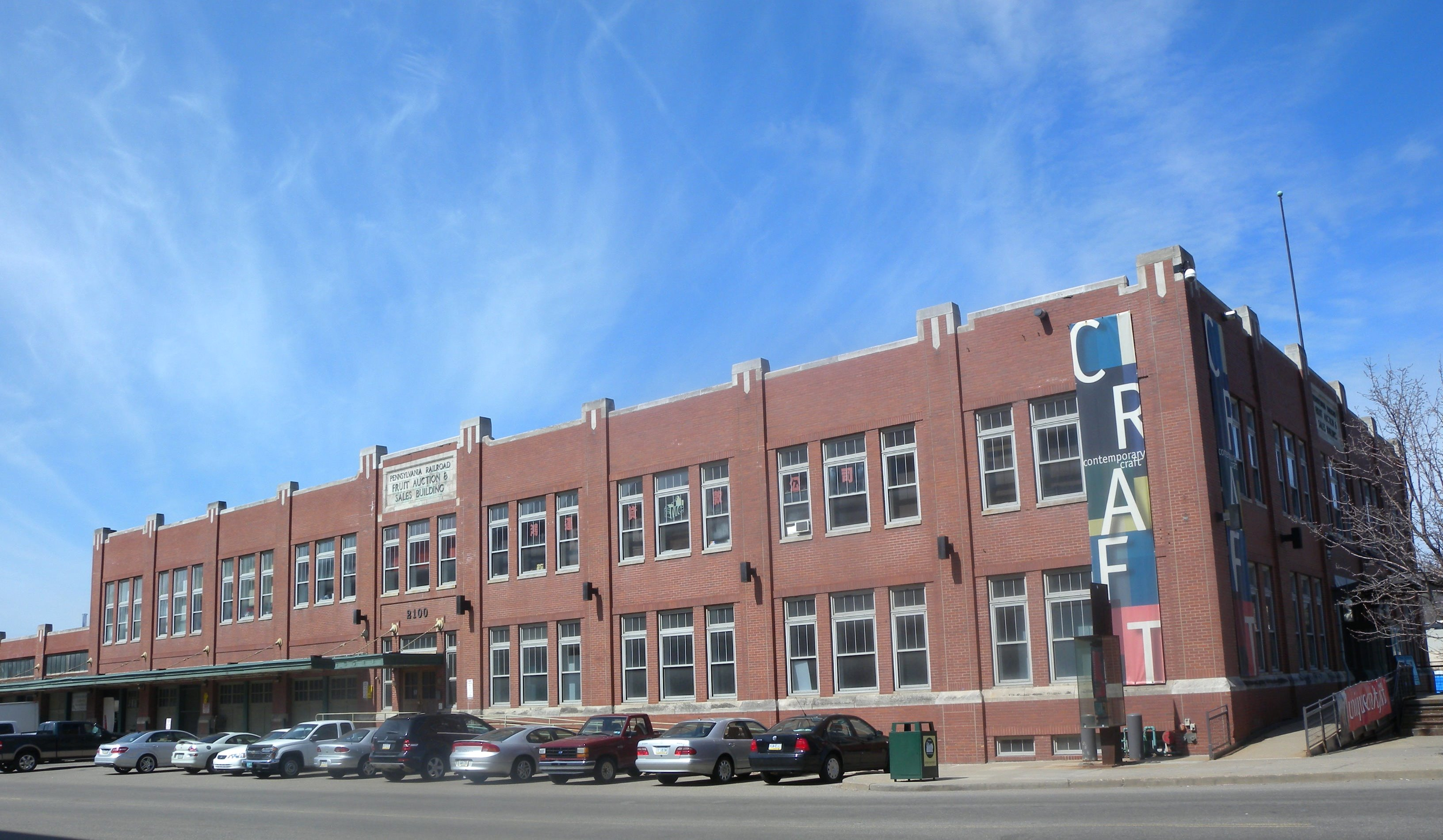
Full view of the main body of the building

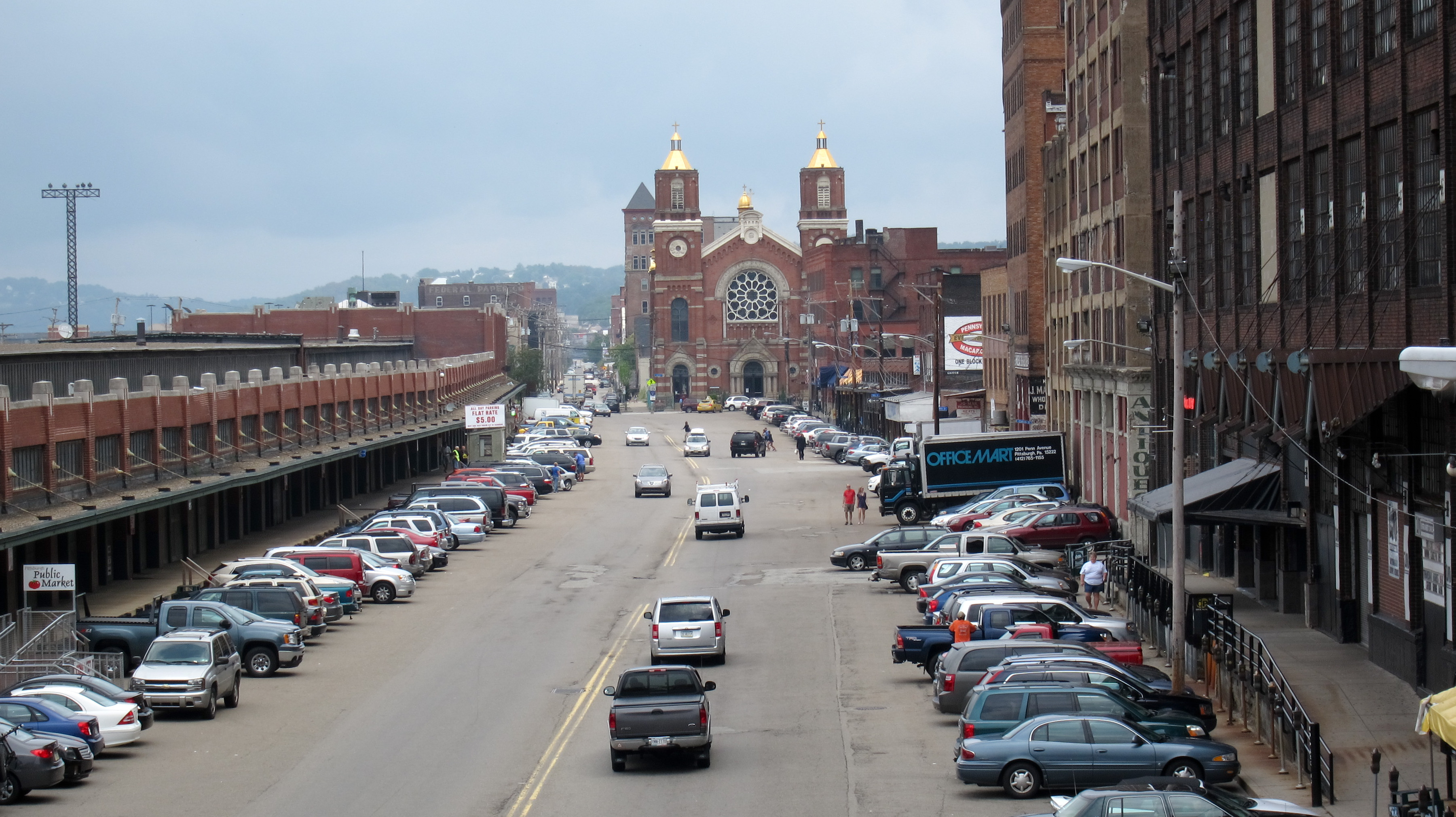
Photo of the Strip District with the Produce Terminal on the left

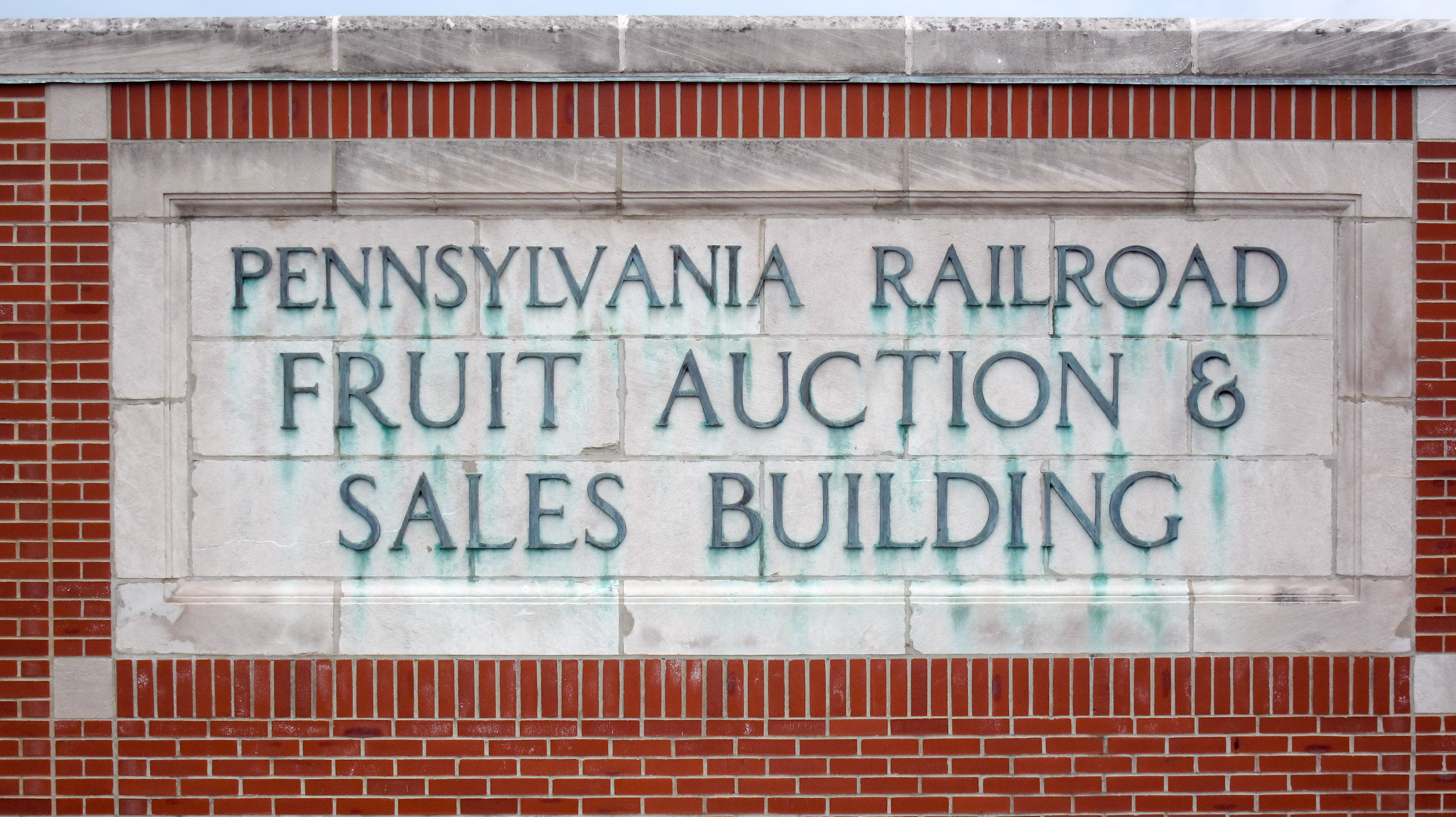
Sign on the front of the Produce Terminal

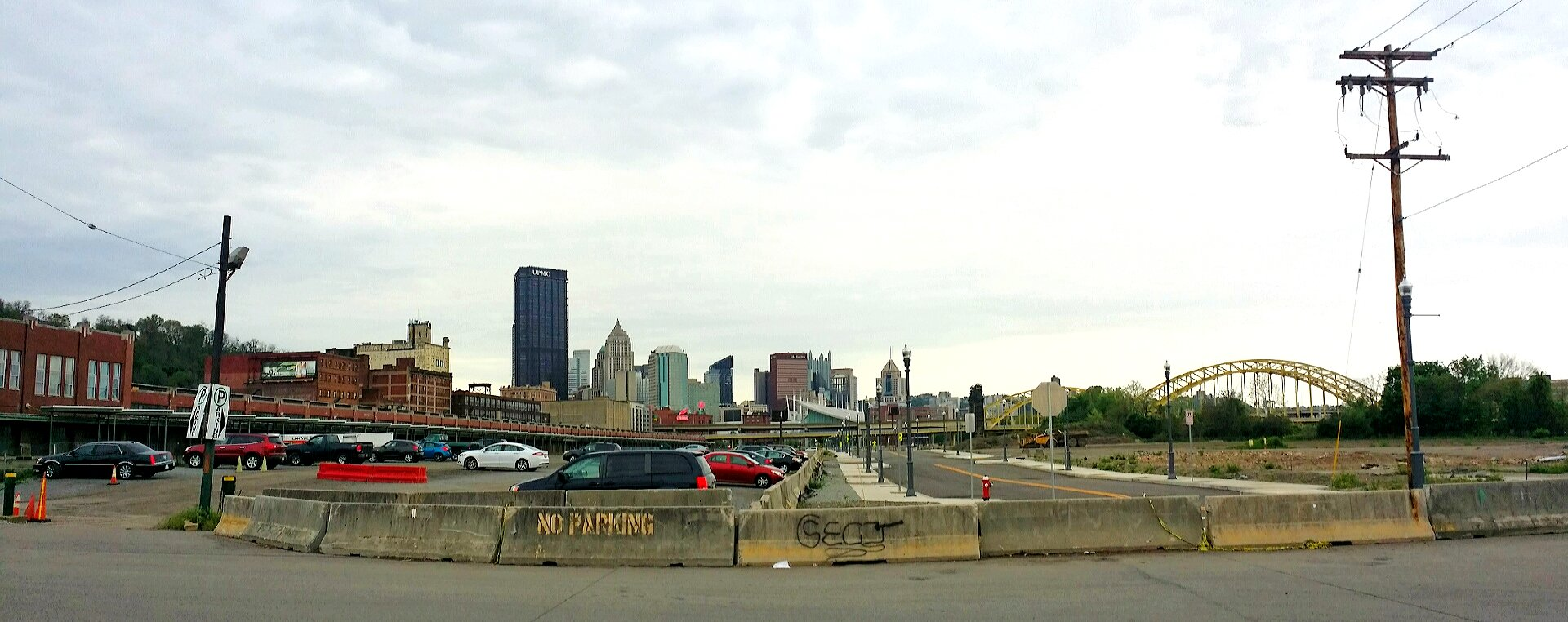
Skyline of Pittsburgh with the Produce Terminal on the far left
