= Schiller Elementary School =

- U.S. National Register of Historic Places
- City of Pittsburgh Historic Structure
- Pittsburgh Landmark – PHLF
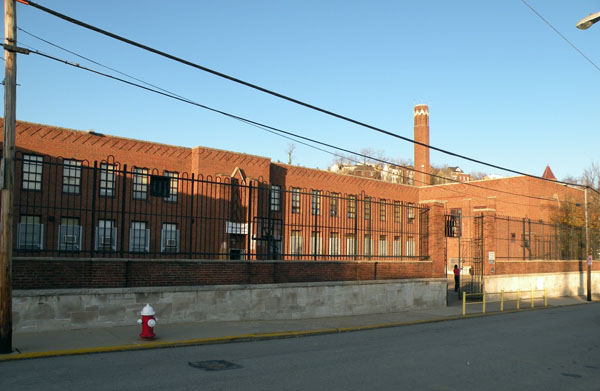

- Location within Pittsburgh Location within Pennsylvania Location within the United States
- Location: 1018 Peralta St., Pittsburgh, Pennsylvania
- Coordinates: 40°27′23″N 79°59′37″W
- Area: 2 acres (0.81 ha)
- Built: 1939
- Architect: Steen, Marion M.; Crump, Edward, Jr., Inc.
- Architectural style: Art Deco
- Website: Schiller Elementary School
- MPS: Pittsburgh Public Schools TR
- NRHP reference No.: 86002707

Significant dates
- Added to NRHP: September 30, 1986
- Designated CPHS: November 30, 1999
- Designated PHLF: 2001

The Schiller STEAM Academy 6-8 (also known as Schiller School) is a magnet school located in the East Allegheny neighborhood of Pittsburgh, Pennsylvania. It was built in 1939. It was listed on the National Register of Historic Places in 1986.
