= Friendship School =

- Liberty School No. 4, Friendship Building
- U.S. National Register of Historic Places
- City of Pittsburgh Historic Structure
- Pittsburgh Landmark – PHLF
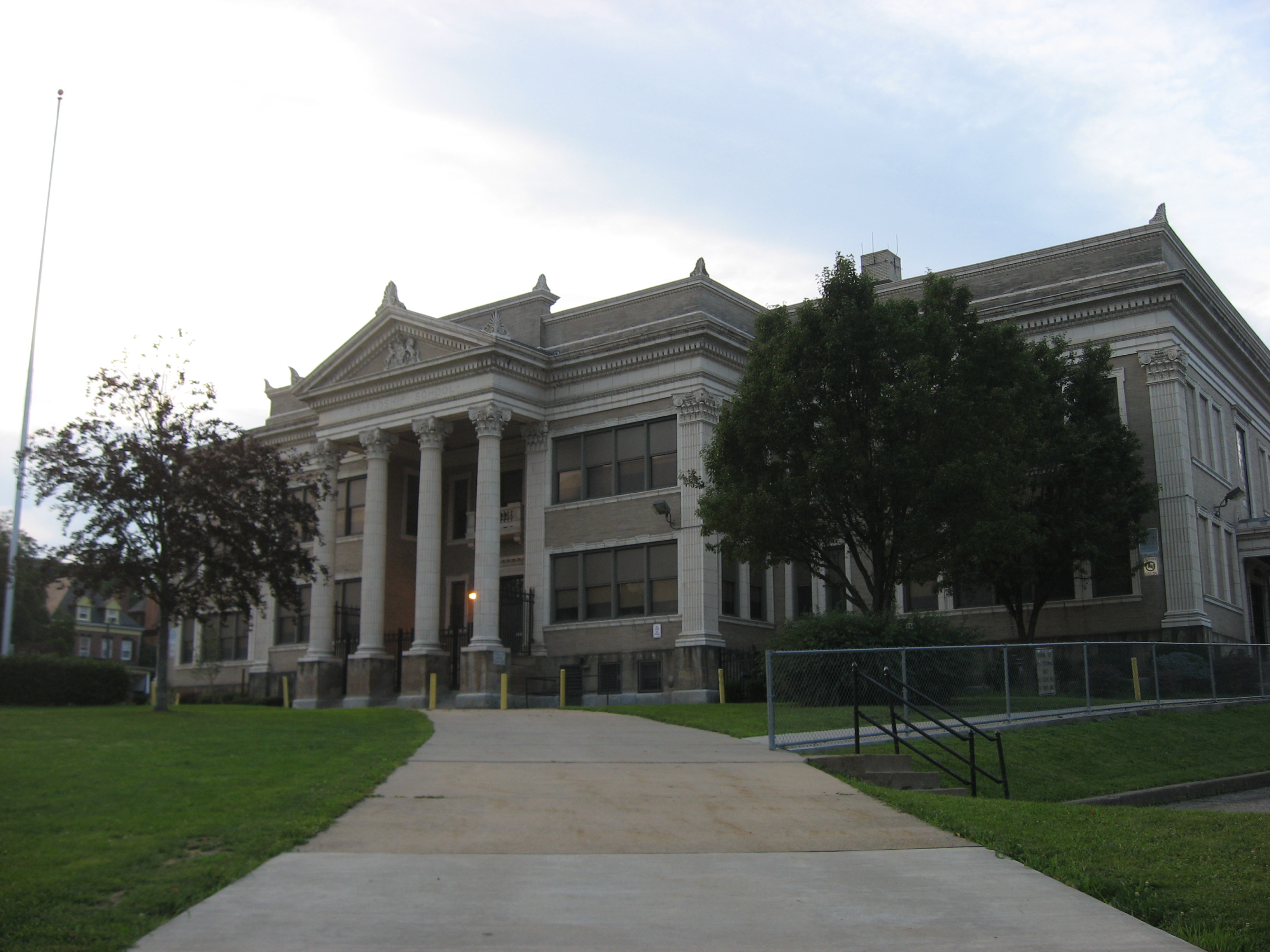

- Location within Pittsburgh Location within Pennsylvania Location within the United States
- Location: 5501 Friendship Ave., Pittsburgh, Pennsylvania
- Coordinates: 40°27′44″N 79°56′9″W
- Area: 2 acres (0.81 ha)
- Built: 1899
- Architect: Bartberger, Charles M.
- Architectural style: Beaux Arts
- MPS: Pittsburgh Public Schools TR
- NRHP reference No.: 86002684

Significant dates
- Added to NRHP: September 30, 1986
- Designated CPHS: November 30, 1999
- Designated PHLF: 1998

The Friendship School, also known as Liberty School No. 4, is a school building built in 1899 in the Friendship neighborhood of Pittsburgh, Pennsylvania. It now houses Pittsburgh Montessori School PreK-5, a public Montessori Magnet School that is part of the Pittsburgh Public School District. It was listed on the National Register of Historic Places in 1986.
