= Allegheny Turn Halle =

Historic building in Pittsburgh

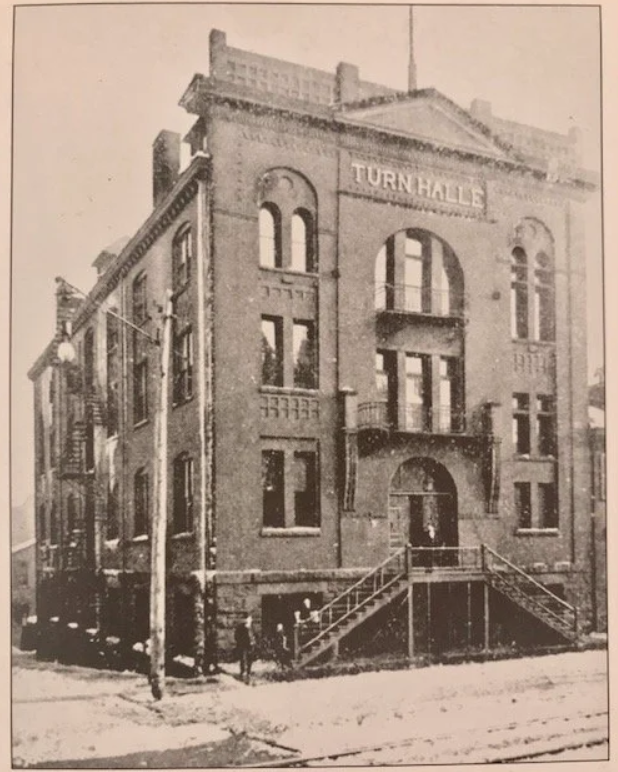
Front Facade of the Former Turn Halle

The Former Allegheny Turn Halle located at 855 South Canal Street, Pittsburgh PA, 15212, is a brick masonry Richardsonian Romanesque construction. The four-and-a-half-story building was constructed in the third quarter of 1889, with the design of Joseph Stillburg being carried out by contractors Murphy & Hamilton. The Turn Halle now serves as a commercial and storage space.

Housed in Pittsburgh’s Schweitzerlock/East Deutschtown neighborhood, the structure was enacted to suit the needs of the Allegheny Turner Association, an offshoot of Friedrich Ludwig Jahn’s 1811 movement. Jahn’s original nationalist gymnastics movement would lose its conservative and antisemitic politics as it spread to Germanic areas beyond Berlin. The 1840s saw the Turner movement’s devolution to liberalism, a cause that would result in their subsequent exile to America following failed efforts in the 1848 revolution against Hohenzollern rulership. The Allegheny chapter was founded in 1850 to serve the municipality of Allegheny City.

== History ==
The land upon which the Turn Halle would be constructed was on land previously inhabited by the Adena and Hopewell tribes and the Monongahela People. In 1788, the plot was incorporated by the municipality of Allegheny. Allegheny would rapidly develop over the course of the 19th century with the construction of the Pennsylvania Main Line Canal and its becoming of a city in 1840. The Turn Halle was built on one of the valuable canal adjacent plots, the first of which was acquitted by the Turner Association in 1870.

By the time of this purchase, the association had already gained a significant political position in the city due to its magnitude of members, caused by a rapid influx of German immigration following the failed revolution of 1848, and its aiding in Union’s cause during the Civil War. The Allegheny chapter was the national seat of the Turners during this time frame. The Turner acquisition is first noted in the 1872 plat map on the corner parcel of Cherry Street and Carpenter Alley. This plot contained a larger three-story wooden structure that housed rooms for lectures, schooling, community gathering, and gymnastics. On January 4, 1888, the structure was completely destroyed in a fire, resulting in a fundraising effort to build a new home for the organization.

The effort would be fully realized on July 22, 1889, when the cornerstone was laid for the new building and a parade was held by the other regional Turner associations. The building was completed on November 28, 1889, and was marked with a massive celebration with over 3,500 in attendance. The celebration culminated in speeches declaring the humanitarian efforts of the organization, mainly putting physical education in public schools. Until 1919, the Turn Halle would serve as the seat of the Allegheny Turner Association. The building housed a gym, swimming pool, concert hall, and bedrooms amongst other utilities. (4). Another fire occurred on December 7, 1893, but much of the building would be spared and subsequently renovated with terracotta and steel to prevent further fire damage.

Due to mounting persecution of German American’s following the first world war, the Allegany Turners would sell the building to H.J. Heinz Company. Following the sale, the Turners would meet at 707 East Ohio Street until the cultural strain of World War 2 caused a disbandment.

The H.J. Heinz Company invested heavily in the building, altering the building to its current state. The facade lettering was removed, the attic was expanded, and Heinz signage was added to the eastern side. The Turn Halle would be incorporated into the company’s infrastructure around the Pennsylvania Railway Line as a platform was created in front of the building. Despite these investments, Heinz only owned the building for 6 years before it was repeatedly sold as a mixed used office and warehouse property.

== Architecture ==
The stark and utilitarian building was designed by Austrian American Architect Joseph Stillburg. Stillburg was a famous architect in the Pittsburgh region. Significant works included the Eberhart and Ober Brewery, the administration building at Seton Hill University, and the now demolished Winter Garden Exposition Buildings. Stillburg's work showcases the mature understanding of the Art Nouveau’s naturalistic qualities, as outlined by Viollet-le-Duc, and the ornate applied ornament of Romanesque. His legacy would be carried out by his mentee, famed Pittsburgh Architect Fredrick J. Osterling.
