= Howe Springs =

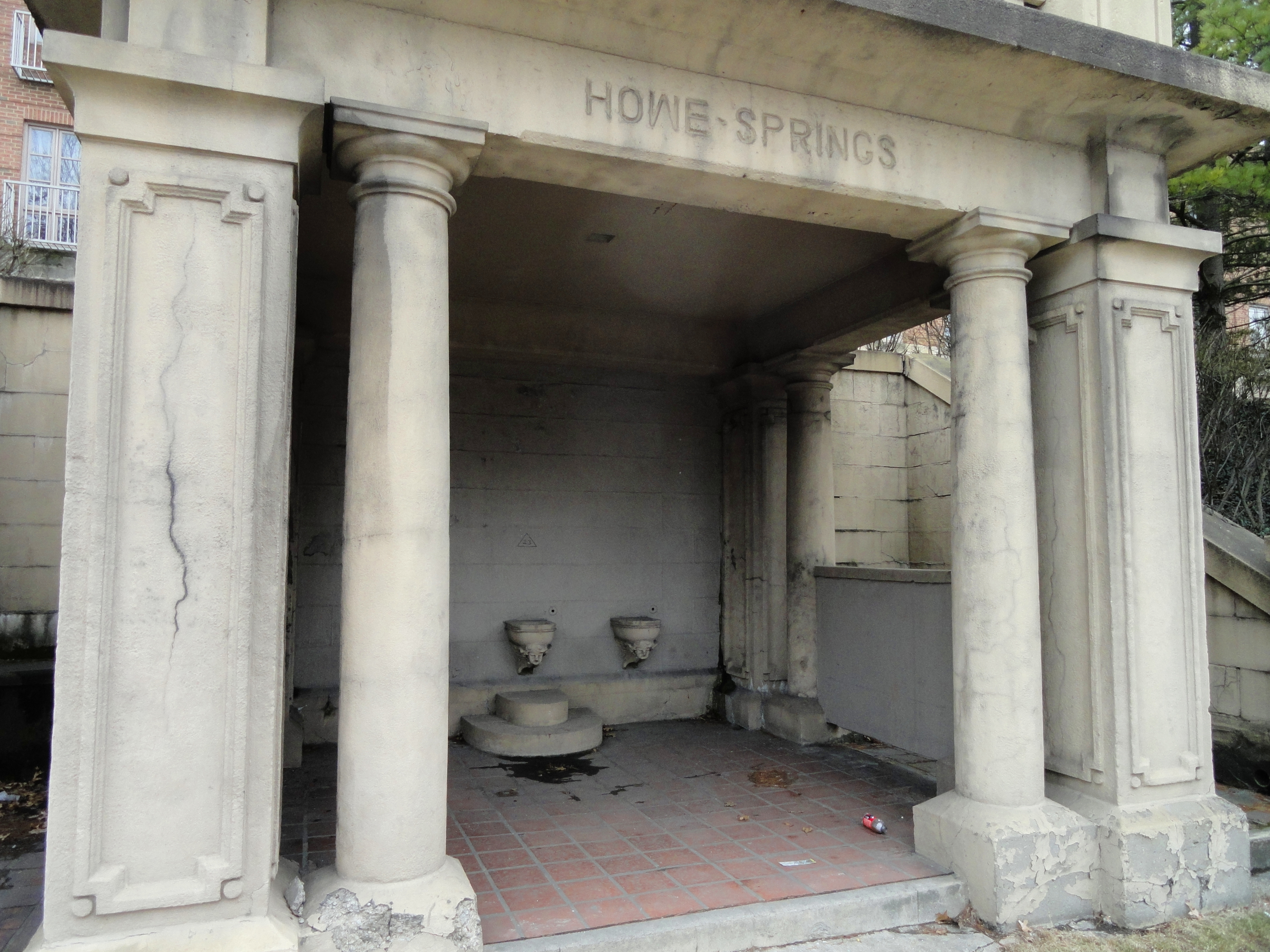

- Location within Pittsburgh
- 40°27′6.21″N 79°55′27.04″W
- Location: South side of Fifth Ave. between S. Highland Ave. & College St. (Shadyside), Pittsburgh, Pennsylvania, United States

History
- Built: 1896 and 1912

Site notes
- Area: Shadyside
- Architect(s): 1896 – Alden & Harlow 1912 – W. H. Van Tine
- Governing body: Arnheim & Neely, Inc.

Howe Springs is located on the southern side of Fifth Avenue between South Highland Avenue and College Street in the Shadyside neighborhood of Pittsburgh, Pennsylvania. The spring was originally built in 1896 in the Romanesque architectural style, and was later renovated in 1912 in the neoclassical style.

== History ==
The exact origin of the tapping of the natural spring which was later Howe Springs remains unknown. The first report on the history of the site came during its construction in 1896, and it claims that the location where the spring was constructed was originally home to a Native American settlement. The origin of Howe Springs began when Thomas Marshall Howe and his family moved from Ohio to Pennsylvania and bought the location, which he named the Greystone Estate. Thomas Howe was one of Pittsburgh's most prominent citizens, involving himself in the financial and political sectors and contributing to a significant amount of philanthropic work. Howe served two terms in the U.S. House of Representatives, representing Pittsburgh as a Whig. He later became one of the founding members of the Republican Party in 1858. During the Civil War he served as Assistant Adjunct General for the Western District of Pennsylvania. Howe also turned down President Grant's nomination for Secretary of the Treasury and President Hayes' nomination for Secretary of War. Howe also held a number of financial positions as the head of various companies during his career. The Howe family was first inspired to create Howe Springs following the devastating Johnstown Flood of 1889, with the idea of making water accessible and free to the public. The first structure that was built around the spring was built by the architectural firm Alden & Harlow and was constructed by John Shreiner in 1896. This structure was erected as a posthumous memorial to Thomas Howe by his wife, Mary A. Howe. Following Mary Howe's death, the Howe heirs sold the Greystone Estate, which included the spring, to Michael Benedum in 1910, and included a broad clause to ensure that the spring would remain free and open to the public. Michael Benedum was a wealthy businessman in Pittsburgh, making his fortune in the oil and natural gas industries. He was also an important philanthropist in Pittsburgh, and a significant historical figure. The new ownership immediately encountered problems with the spring. In April 1911 it was reported that the water in Howe Springs was found to be impure by the City Water Bureau, and city workers destroyed the structure that had fed the spring. Howe's descendants, who wanted to make sure that the spring continued to be free and open to the public, took legal action against the city and the new owners. In order to end the drama around the spring, a plan for a new structure was made by architect W. H. Van Tine. In addition to a new structure around the spring, a new spring was also designed to be built which would improve water quality. The new structure and spring were completed in 1912, and once again Howe Springs was opened to the public in its new neoclassical design. Howe Springs was nominated in January 2016 to become a City Historic Landmark by Preservation Pittsburgh.

== Architecture ==
The original structure around Howe Springs was designed by architecture firm Alden & Harlow, who were active mainly in Boston and Pittsburgh. Their structure was designed in the Romanesque Revival style, and lasted from 1896 to 1910. The second, and current structure, around the spring was constructed by notable Pittsburgh-based architect William H. Van Tine. Van Tine's structure was designed in the neoclassical style, and construction finished in 1912. The structure has significant Grecian influences, and has even been compared to a new home to the ancient Greek Oracle at Delphi.

== Gallery ==
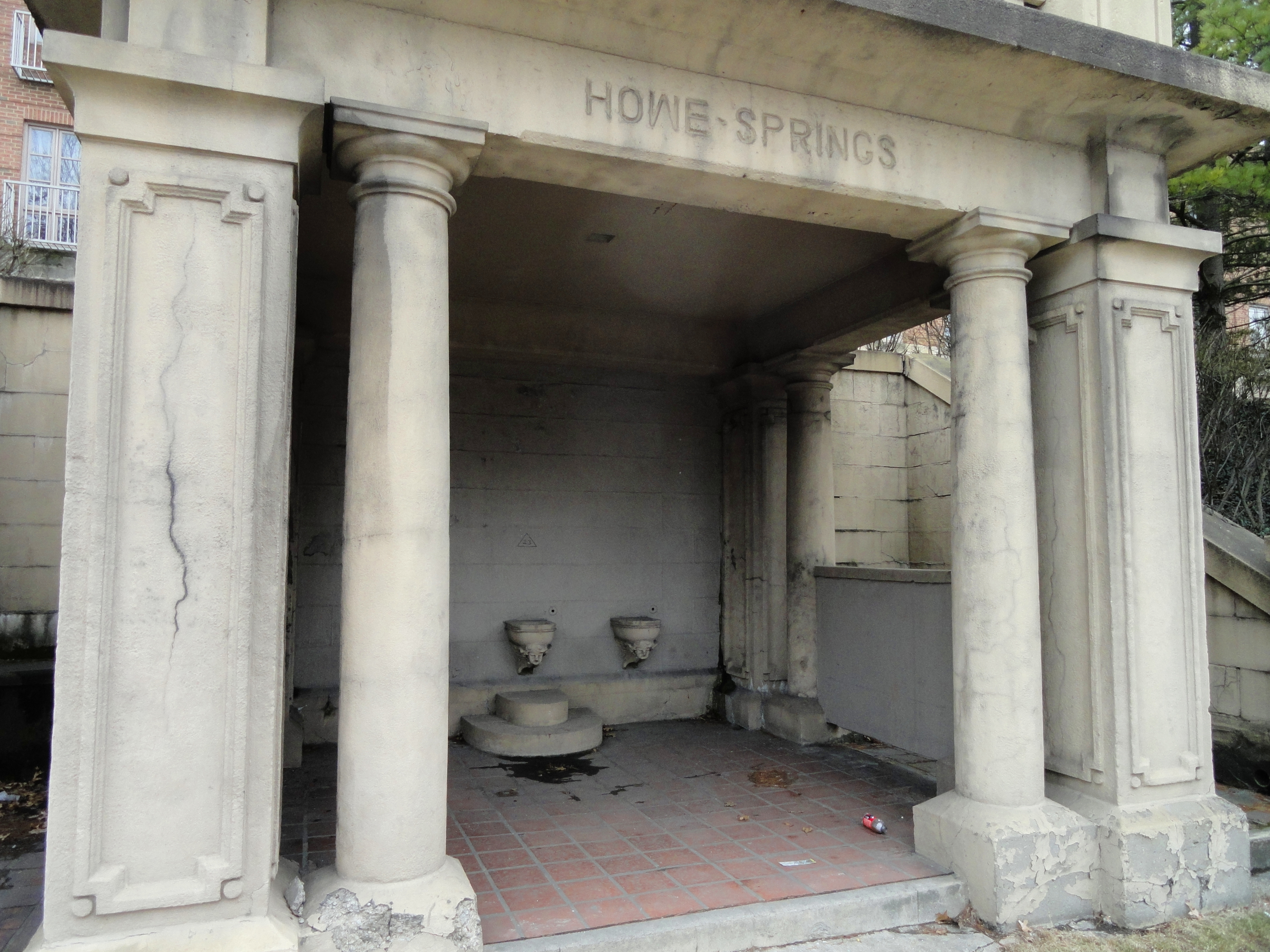
Inside of Howe Springs

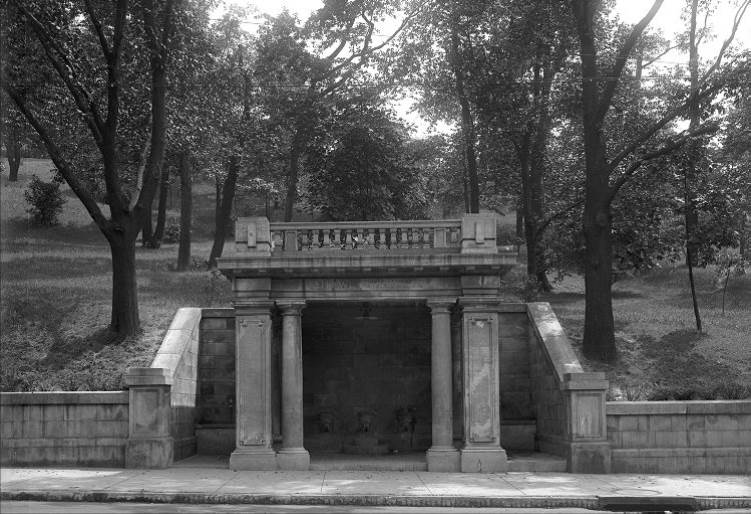
Howe Springs in 1910
