= List of Pittsburgh History and Landmarks Foundation Historic Landmarks =

The Pittsburgh History and Landmarks Foundation (PHLF) Historic Landmark plaque program was begun in 1968 in order to identify architecturally significant structures and significant pieces of Pittsburgh, Pennsylvania, United States's local heritage throughout Allegheny County. Nominations are reviewed by the private non-profit foundation's Historic Plaque Designation Committee composed of trustees, architectural historians, and citizens.

Beginning in 2010, the committee expanded its program to consider applications for historic status from counties surrounding Allegheny, extending its reach to a 250-mile radius from the city, as long as the site has a connection to the greater Pittsburgh region. Historic designation by the foundation does not protect the building from alteration or demolition. Structures awarded the designation typically have aluminum or bronze plaques affixed to their exterior that signify their status. Over 500 Historic Landmark Plaques have been awarded since the program's inception, although not all structures have been preserved. These designations are not to be confused with City of Pittsburgh historic designations.

The table below lists all Pittsburgh History and Landmark Foundation Historic Landmark designations through 2016 initially sorted alphabetically by their official listing.

| Landmark name | Image | Year(s) constructed | Architect/builder/ engineer/decorator | Address | Location | Year of PHLF designation | Status |
|---|---|---|---|---|---|---|---|
| 132 East Crafton Avenue (George Leber house) | | 1938 | George M. Rowland | 132 East Crafton Avenue | Crafton | 2003 | |
| 841 North Lincoln Avenue | | 1878 | | 841 North Lincoln Avenue | Allegheny West | 1977 | |
| 899 Old Thorn Run Road | | 1814 | | 899 Old Thorn Run Road | Moon Township | 1988 | |
| 1133 Penn Avenue (Byrnes & Kiefer Building) | | 1892 | Murphy & Hamilton | 1133 Penn Avenue | The Strip | 1987 | |
| 1939 House (Good Housekeeping house) | | 1939 | Dwight James Baum | 2363 Sebring Place | Wilkinsburg | 1998 | |
| 4841 Ellsworth Avenue (Alexander M. Guthrie house) | | c. 1870 | | 4841 Ellsworth Avenue | Shadyside | 2012 | |
| 5800 block of Pierce Street | | 1891–92 | | 5800 block of Pierce Street | Shadyside | 2003 | |
| 6661 Aylesboro Avenue | | 1886; remodeled 1920s | James T. Steen, 1886 | 6661 Aylesboro Avenue | Squirrel Hill | 2003 | |
| 7120 Ohio River Boulevard (George J. Schmitt) | | 1916 | Janssen & Abbott | 7120 Ohio River Boulevard | Ben Avon | 2003 | |
| Addy-Spencer House | | 1864–69 | | 919-20 St. James Street | Shadyside | 2000 | |
| Frank Alden house | | 1890 | Longfellow, Alden & Harlow | 617 Linden Avenue | Point Breeze | 1995 | |
| Alder Court apartments | | 1913 | Henry M. Kropff | 6112 Alder Street | Shadyside | 1975 | |
| All Saints' Roman Catholic Church | | 1914 | John T. Comès | 19 Wilson Street | Etna | 1997 | |
| Allderdice (Taylor) High School | | 1927 | Robert M. Trimble | Forward and Shady Avenues | Squirrel Hill | 2002 | |
| Allegheny Arsenal Powder Magazine | | 1814 | Benjamin Henry Latrobe | Arsenal Park | Lawrenceville | 2003 | |
| Allegheny Cemetery | | 1844 (founded) | | | Lawrenceville | 1988 | |
| Allegheny Cemetery: Butler Street Entrance | | 1847, 1870 | John Chislett and Barr & Moser | Butler Street | Lawrenceville | 1974 | |
| Allegheny Cemetery, Penn Avenue Entrance | | 1887 | Dull & Macomb | 4715 Penn Avenue | Lawrenceville | 2001 | |
| Allegheny City Electric Light Plant—1895 building | | 1895 | David Hunter Jr., engineer | 822 Riversea Road | Central Northside | 2012 | |
| Allegheny Country Club | | 1902 | William Ross Proctor | Country Club Road | Sewickley Heights | 2003 | |
| Allegheny County Airport | | 1931, 1936 | Stanley L. Roush and Henry Hornbostel | | West Mifflin Township | 1981 | |
| Allegheny County Court House | | 1888 | Henry Hobson Richardson | Grant Street and Fifth Avenue | Downtown | 1968 | |
| Allegheny County Fairgrounds | | 1927–1934 | | South Park | South Park Township | 2009 | |
| Allegheny County Jail (now Family Court Facility, County Court of Common Pleas) | | 1886 | Henry Hobson Richardson | Ross Street and Fifth Avenue | Downtown | 1968 | |
| Allegheny General Hospital (1930 part) | | 1928–1930 | York & Sawyer | East North and Cedar Avenues | Central North Side | 2002 | |
| Allegheny HYP Club (Harvard-Yale-Princeton Club) | | 1890; remodeled 1930–31 | Edward B. Lee, architect for remodeling | 617-619 William Penn Place | Downtown | 2002 | |
| Allegheny Market House site | | 1863 | | Allegheny Square East | Allegheny Center | 1979 | |
| Allegheny Observatory | | 1900 | Thorsten E. Billquist, architect; John Brashear and James Keeler, consultants | Riverview Park, Observatory Hill | North Side | 1973 | |
| Allegheny Regional Branch, Carnegie Library of Pittsburgh | | 1890 | Smithmeyer & Pelz | Allegheny Square East | Allegheny Center | 1970 | |
| Allegheny Social Hall | | 1902-03 | | 810-812 Concord Street | East Allegheny | 2003 | |
| Allegheny Traditional Academy (Allegheny Middle School, formerly Allegheny High School) | | 1904, 1937 | Frederick J. Osterling, Marion M. Steen | 810 Arch Street | Allegheny Center | 1992 | |
| Allegheny West Historic District | | 1850–1874, 1875–1899 c. | | Roughly bounded by Brighton Rd., Jabok Way, Ridge and Allegheny Aves. | North Side | 1997 | |
| Allen Hall, University of Pittsburgh (Old Mellon Institute) | | 1915 | J. H. Giesey | O'Hara and Thackeray Streets | Oakland | 1972 | |
| Alpha Terrace | | 1889 c., 1894 | | 700 block, North Beatty Street | East Liberty | 1979 | |
| Alumni Hall, University of Pittsburgh (Masonic Temple) | | 1914 | Benno Janssen & Abbott | Fifth and Lytton Avenues | Oakland | 2002 | |
| Anderson Manor (James Anderson house) | | 1830 c., 1905 | | 1423 Liverpool Street | Manchester | 1989 | |
| Andrew Carnegie Free Library | | 1899 | Struthers & Hannah | 300 Beechwood Avenue | Carnegie | 1979 | |
| John Arch house | | 1874 | | 311 Sharpsburg-Kittaning Road | O'Hara Township | 1975 | |
| Aria Cultural District Lofts (Gerber Carriage Company) | | 1904–05 | Rutan & Russell | 121 Seventh Street | Downtown | 2016 | |
| Armstrong Tunnel | | 1926–27 | Vernon R. Covell, engineer, and Stanley L. Roush, architect | Second Avenue to Forbes Avenue | Bluff, the | 2003 | |
| Arrott Building | | 1902 | Frederick J. Osterling | Fourth Avenue and Wood Street | Downtown | 2000 | |
| Arsenal Middle School (City of Pittsburgh Public Schools) | | 1932 | Schwab, Palmgreen & Merrick, Marion M. Steen | 3901 Butler Street | Lawrenceville | 2001 | |
| Art Institute of Pittsburgh (formerly the Equitable Gas Company Building) | | 1924–25 | J. F. Kuntz | 420 Boulevard of the Allies | Downtown | 1995 | |
| Arthurs-Johnson House | | 1873 | | 6925 Ohio River Boulevard | Ben Avon | 1981 | |
| Aspinwall | | 1893 (incorporated) | | The greater part of the town south of Route 28, and the Sauer Buildings to the north, are included. | Aspinwall | 1998 | |
| Atwell-Christy house | | 1862 | | 403 Frederick Avenue | Sewickley | 1979 | |
| "Bagatelle" (James G. Pontefract house) | | 1894 | Longfellow, Alden & Harlow | Little Sewickley Creek Road 40°33′34.77″N 80°11′49.78″W | Edgeworth | 1995 | |
| Baker Hall (Central Building, Administration Hall) | | 1914, 1919 | Palmer & Hornbostel | Between Forbes Avenue and Frew Street, Carnegie Mellon University | Squirrel Hill | 2000 | |
| Baxter-Brushton School (Pittsburgh High School for the Creative & Performing Arts) | | 1909; enlarged 1911; further additions 1929 | Kiehnel and Elliott (1909); Kiehnel, Elliott & Chalfant (1911 addition) | 925 Brushton Avenue | Homewood | 2002 | |
| "Baywood" (Alexander King Estate) | | 1880 c.; 1890 | | 1251 North Negley Avenue | Highland Park | 2000 | |
| "Bear's Retreat" | | 1790, 1840 | | 253 Inglefield Drive | Pleasant Hills | 1983 | |
| Bedford Springs Hotel and Golf Course | | c. 1806 and after | Solomon Filler, architect of Colonial Building, 1829. Golf course redesign by Donald Ross, 1923. | 2138 Business 220 | Bedford | 2014 | |
| Beechwood Elementary School | | 1908, 1923 | Press C. Dowler | 810 Rockland Avenue | Beechview | 2002 | |
| Bellefield Hall (YMHA) | | 1924 | Benno Janssen | 315 South Bellefield Avenue | Oakland | 1992 | |
| Bellevue Public Library | | 1875 | James Madison Balph | 34 North Balph Avenue | Bellevue | 1976 | |
| Beltzhoover Elementary School (City of Pittsburgh Public Schools) | | 1909 | William J. Shaw, Thomas Lloyd | Cedarhurst Street and Estella Avenue | Beltzhoover | 2001 | |
| Benedum Center for the Performing Arts (Stanley Theatre) | | 1927 | Hoffman-Henon Company | Seventh Street and Penn Avenue | Downtown | 1976 | |
| Benedum-Trees Building | | 1905 | Thomas H. Scott | 221 Fourth Avenue | Downtown | 1973 | |
| Beulah Presbyterian Church | | 1837 | William McCrea | Beulah and McCrady Roads | Churchill | 1970 | |
| Bigham House | | 1844 | | Pennridge Road, Chatham Village 40°25′39.65″N 80°1′6.44″W | Mount Washington | 1990 | |
| Boggs Avenue Elementary School | | 1925 | Sidney F. Heckert | Boggs and Southern Avenues | Mt. Washington | 2002 | |
| Boss Hall | | 1916 | Henry Hornbostel | Between Forbes Avenue and Frew Street, Carnegie Mellon University | Squirrel Hill | 2000 | |
| Bost Building | | 1891–92 | | 621-23 East Eighth Avenue | Homestead | 2000 | |
| Boyer house | | 1840 c. | | 5679 Library Road | Bethel Park | 1990 | |
| Braddock Carnegie Library | | 1888, 1893 | William Halsey Wood and Longfellow, Alden & Harlow | Library Street and Parker Avenue | Braddock | 1976 | |
| George Brayman house | | 1953 | Peter Berndtson and Cornelia Brierly | 2 Canterbury Road | Ben Avon Heights 40°30′45″N 80°4′18″W | 1989 | |
| Bridge piers: Manchester, Point, Wabash | | various | | various | various | 1977 | |
| Bridgeville Public Library | | 1870 c. | | 441 Station Street | Bridgeville | 1974 | |
| Brilliant Cutoff Viaduct of the Pennsylvania Railroad | | 1902 | William H. Brown, engineer | Along Washington Boulevard | Lincoln-Lemington-Belmar/Homewood | 2003 | |
| The Brix at 26 (Pittsburgh Mercantile Company) | | 1908 | Rutan & Russell | 2600–10 East Carson Street | South Side | 2014 | |
| Brown Chapel A.M.E. Church | | 1903 | Frederick C. Sauer | 1400 Boyle Street | Central North Side | 1988 | |
| Brown Road Bridge (in Tinbrook Park) | | 1891 | Charles Davis | Brown and Big Sewickley Creek Roads | Franklin Park | 1971 | |
| Buhl Building | | 1913 | Janssen & Abbott | 204 Fifth Avenue | Downtown | 1981 | |
| Buhl Planetarium and Institute of Popular Science (now part of the Pittsburgh Children's Museum) | | 1939 | Ingham & Boyd | Children's Way | Allegheny Center | 2001 | |
| Burke Building | | 1836 | John Chislett | 209 Fourth Avenue | Downtown | 1970 | |
| Burtner House | | 1821 | | Burtner Road | Harrison Township | 1975 | |
| Byers Hall, Community College of Allegheny County (Byers-Lyons house) | | 1898 | Alden & Harlow | 901 Ridge Avenue | Allegheny West | 1989 | |
| Byham Theater (Fulton or Gayety Theatre) | | 1904 | Dodge & Morrison | 101 Sixth Street | Downtown | 2002 | |
| Calvary A.M.E. Church of Braddock (Second Presbyterian Church of Braddock) | | 1892 | | 441 Sixth Street | Braddock | 2009 | |
| Calvary Episcopal Church | | 1907 | Ralph Adams Cram | Shady Avenue and Walnut Street | Shadyside | 1969 | |
| Calvary United Methodist Church | | 1895 | Vrydaugh and Shepherd, with T. B. Wolfe | Allegheny and Beech Avenues | Allegheny West | 1972 | |
| Carlow College Worship and Community Center (St. Agnes' Roman Catholic Church) | | 1917 | John T. Comès | Fifth Avenue and Robinson Street | Oakland | 2000 | |
| Carnegie Coffee Company (Carnegie U.S. Post Office) | | 1916 | Oscar Winderoth | 132 East Main Street | Carnegie | 2014 | |
| Carnegie Free Library of McKeesport | | 1902 | William J. East | 1507 Library Street | McKeesport | 1979 | |
| Carnegie Mellon University, the original campus (Carnegie Institute of Technology; Carnegie Technical Schools) | | 1905–32 | Palmer & Hornbostel, Henry Hornbostel | Between Forbes Avenue and Frew Street | Squirrel Hill | 2000 | |
| Carnegie Institute | | 1895, 1907 | Longfellow, Alden & Harlow | 4400 Forbes Avenue | Oakland | 1970 | |
| Carnegie Library of Homestead | | 1898 | Alden & Harlow | 510 Tenth Avenue | Munhall | 1989 | |
| Carnegie Library of Pittsburgh | | 1895 | Longfellow, Alden & Harlow | Schenley Plaza | Oakland | 1970 | |
| Carnegie Library of Pittsburgh, Homewood Branch | | 1910 | Howard K. Jones for Alden & Harlow | 7101 Hamilton Avenue | Homewood | 2004 | |
| Carnegie Library of Pittsburgh, Lawrenceville Branch | | 1898 | Alden & Harlow | 279 Fisk Street | Lawrenceville | 1988 | |
| Carnegie Library of Pittsburgh, Mount Washington Branch | | 1900 | Alden & Harlow | 315 Grandview Avenue | Mount Washington | 1989 | |
| Carnegie Library of Pittsburgh, South Side Branch | | 1909 | Alden & Harlow | East Carson and South Twenty-second Streets | South Side | 1990 | |
| Carnegie Library of Pittsburgh, West End Branch | | 1899 | Alden & Harlow | 47 Wabash Avenue | West End | 2012 | |
| Carnegie Steel Manager's house | | 1900 | | 518 East Eleventh Avenue | Munhall | 2007 | |
| Carrie Furnaces and Pinkerton Landing site | | 1884, 1892 | | | Rankin and Swissvale/Homestead (primarily in) | 1989 | |
| Rachel Carson house | | 1870 | | 613 Marion Avenue | Springdale Township | 1975 | |
| Cathedral of Learning | | 1926–1937 | Charles Klauder | University of Pittsburgh | Oakland | 1973 | |
| Cathedral of Learning interiors, University of Pittsburgh (Nationality Rooms, Commons Room, Darlington Library, Croghan-Schenley Ballroom, Braun Room) | | 1937–1946 c. | Charles Klauder and others | Cathedral of Learning | Oakland | 1972 | |
| Croghan-Schenley Ballroom | | 1835 | Mordecai van Horne? | Cathedral of Learning | Oakland | 1970 | |
| Central Catholic High School | | 1927 | Edward J. Weber, of Weber, Link & Bowers | 4720 Fifth Avenue | Oakland | 1976 | |
| Central Presbyterian Church | | 1911–12 | Harry Wimer | 305 Allegheny Street | Tarentum | 2016 | |
| Chalfant Hall, Community College of Allegheny County | | c. 1900 | | 915 Ridge Avenue | Allegheny West | 1981 | |
| Chalfant house | | c. 1850 | | 89 Locust Street | Etna | 2012 | |
| Chalfant Log House | | 1832 | | 2716 West Hardies Road | Hampton Township | 2007 | |
| Chancellor's house (Harvey Childs house) | | 1896 | Peabody and Stearns | 718 Devonshire Street | Shadyside | 1973 | |
| Chatham Village | | 1932, 1935 | Ingham & Boyd, architects. Stein & Wright, planners. Ralph E. Griswold, landscape architect. | Virginia and Bigham Streets | Mount Washington | 1990 | |
| Christian Tabernacle Kodesh Church of Immanuel (St. Paul's Episcopal Church) | | 1896 | Elise Mercur | 2601 Centre Avenue | Hill, the | 2007 | |
| St. John the Baptist Church (The Church Brew Works) | | 1903 | Beezer Brothers | 3501 Liberty Avenue | Lawrenceville | 2001 | |
| Church of St. Benedict the Moor | | 1894 | Moeser & Bippus | 89 Crawford Street | Hill, the | 1998 | |
| Church of the Ascension | | 1898 | William Halsey Wood | Ellsworth Avenue and Neville Street | Shadyside | 1971 | |
| Church of the Epiphany | | 1902 | Edward Stotz | Washington Place and Centre Avenue | Hill, the | 1998 | |
| Church of the Good Shepherd | | 1891 | William Halsey Wood | Second Avenue and Johnston Street | Hazelwood | 1972 | |
| The Church of The Holy Cross (St. James Episcopal Church) | | 1905-06 | Carpenter & Crocker | 7507 Kelly Street | Homewood | 2007 | |
| City of Pittsburgh Department of Water | | 1907 (begun c.) | Rutan & Russell, Thomas H. Scott | 226 Delafield Road | Pittsburgh | 2000 | |
| City Theatre | | 1859 | | 1300 Bingham Street | South Side | 2000 | |
| City-County Building | | 1915–1917 | Henry Hornbostel, designer; Edward B. Lee, architect, with Palmer, Hornbostel & Jones | Grant Street and Forbes Avenue | Downtown | 1974 | |
| Clark Candy Company: chimney | | 1924 | | 503 Martindale Street | North Shore | 1975 | Demolished |
| "Clayton" | | 1870 c., 1892 | Frederick J. Osterling | Penn and Homewood Avenues | Point Breeze | 2000 | |
| The Clemente Museum (Engine House No. 25) | | 1895–96 | William Y. Brady | 3339 Penn Avenue | Lawrenceville | 2016 | |
| College of Fine Arts (School of Applied Design) | | 1912, 1916 | Henry Hornbostel | Between Forbes Avenue and Frew Street, Carnegie Mellon University | Squirrel Hill | 2000 | |
| Colfax Elementary School (City of Pittsburgh Public Schools) | | 1911 | Edward Stotz | Beechwood Boulevard and Phillips Avenue | Squirrel Hill | 2001 | |
| Colonial Place Historic District | | 1898 | George S. Orth, architect; E. H. Bachman, landscape artist | Colonial Place and Ellsworth Avenue | Shadyside | 2007 | |
| Coltart house | | 1843 | | 3441 Forbes Avenue | Oakland | 1972 | Demolished |
| John T. Comès house | | 1906–10 | John T. Comès | 3242 Beechwood Boulevard | Squirrel Hill | 2016 | |
| Commerce Court | | 1918 | | Station Square | South Shore | 1982 | |
| Concord Elementary School (City of Pittsburgh Public Schools) | | 1939 | Marion M. Steen | 2340 Brownsville Road | Carrick | 2001 | |
| Congregation B'nai Israel | | 1923 | Henry Hornbostel, with William S. Fraser, Philip Friedman, and Alexander Sharove | 327 North Negley Avenue | East Liberty | 1979 | |
| Connelly School | | 1930 | Edward B. Lee | 1501 Bedford Avenue | Hill, the | 2002 | |
| Conroy Education Center (Conroy Junior High School) (City of Pittsburgh Public Schools) | | 1936 | Marion M. Steen | Page and Fulton Streets | Manchester | 2001 | |
| Convent of Mercy | | 1909 | Edward Stotz | 3333 Fifth Avenue | Oakland | 1979 | |
| Corliss Tunnel | | 1914 | Stanley L. Roush | Corliss Street south from West Carson Street | Elliott | 2002 | |
| The Cork Factory (Armstrong Cork Company Buildings) | | 1901, 1902; addition 1913 | Frederick J. Osterling | 2349 Railroad Street | Strip District | 2007 | |
| County Office Building | | 1929–31 | Stanley L. Roush | Ross Street at Forbes Avenue | Downtown | 2002 | |
| Coursin Heights Plan/Becker house | | 20th century | | 511 Romine Avenue | McKeesport | 1989 | |
| Craig-Wertheimer house | | 1870 c. | | 3210 Niagara Street | Oakland | 1984 | Demolished |
| Crawford House/Ingleside Hotel | | 1866 | | 5402 Broad Street | Garfield | 1982 | Demolished |
| Creighton Avenue | | 1900 c. | | Creighton Avenue | Crafton | 1990 | |
| The Crescent Apartment Building | | 1904 c. | | 738 Rebecca Avenue | Wilkinsburg | 2009 | |
| Cross Keys Inn | | 1851 c. | | 599 Dorseyville Road | Indiana Township | 1973 | |
| D'Arlington Apartments | | 1910 | Edward Keen | 504 North Neville Street | Oakland | 1981 | |
| Harry Darlington House | | 1890 c. | | 721 Brighton Road | Allegheny West | 1974 | |
| Davis farmhouse | | 1880 c. | | 3423 Brownsville Road | Brentwood | 1993 | Demolished |
| Superintendent Henry J. Davis House, U.S. Steel Clairton Works | | 1903–1910 c. | | 556 Mitchell Avenue | Clairton | 2009 | |
| Devonshire Street | | 19th century (late) | | Devonshire Street | Shadyside | 1974 | |
| Dilworth School (Dilworth Traditional Academy) | | 1915 | Vrydaugh & Wolfe | Collins Street and Stanton Avenue | East Liberty | 1997 | |
| Dixmont State Hospital | | 1862 | | Ohio River Boulevard | Kilbuck Township | 1970 | Demolished |
| Dollar Savings Bank | | 1871 | Isaac Hobbs & Sons | 348 Fourth Avenue | Downtown | 1970 | |
| Doherty Hall (School of Applied Sciences, Engineering Hall) | | 1908 | Palmer & Hornbostel | Between Forbes Avenue and Frew Street, Carnegie Mellon University | Squirrel Hill | 2000 | |
| Dormont Swimming Pool (Borough of) | | 1920 | | 1801 Dormont Avenue | Dormont | 2002 | |
| Harlan Douglas house | | 1962–1965 | Peter Berndtson | 155 White Oak Drive | Ross Township | 1989 | |
| Duquesne Club | | 1887 | Longfellow, Alden & Harlow | 325 Sixth Avenue | Downtown | 1976 | |
| Duquesne Incline | | 1877 | Samuel Diescher | 1220 Grandview Avenue and West Carson Street | Mount Washington and Station Square | 1969 | |
| East Liberty Presbyterian Church | | 1935 | Ralph Adams Cram | Highland and Penn Avenues | East Liberty | 1969 | |
| East Pittsburgh U.S. Post Office | | 1916 | James A. Wetmore | 701 Linden Avenue | East Pittsburgh | 2014 | |
| Ebenezer Baptist Church | | 1931 | | 2001 Wylie Avenue | Hill, the | 1979 | Demolished |
| Edgar Thomson Works, United States Steel | | 1875 (since) | | | North Braddock | 1989 | |
| Edgewood | | 1888 (incorporated) | | The town as a whole. | Edgewood | 1998 | |
| Edgeworth Club | | 1930–31 | Brandon Smith | 511 East Drive | Edgeworth | 2007 | |
| Eggers House | | 1860 (prior to) | | Maple Springs Drive | South Park Township | 1970 | |
| Elizabeth Borough Historic District | | 1850–1930 c. | | Second Avenue | Elizabeth | 2009 | |
| Ellsworth Terrace | | 1913 | William H. Justice?, designer | 4800 block, Ellsworth Avenue | Shadyside | 1985 | |
| "Elm Ridge", James Gardiner Coffin/John Walker House | | 1869; Plan published in Hobbs Architecture, 1873 | Isaac Hobbs, architect; David Kerr, builder | 1 Breck Drive | Leetsdale | 2007 | |
| Elmhurst Road Historic District | | 1904–20 | Wilbur M. May et al. | Elmhurst Place | Fox Chapel | 2007 | |
| Elroy Elementary School | | 1920 and 1925 | | 3129 Elroy Avenue | Brentwood | 1997 | |
| Emmanuel Episcopal Church | | 1886 | Henry Hobson Richardson | North and Allegheny Avenues | Allegheny West | 1968 | |
| Emsworth Locks and Dam | | 1922 and 1928 | U.S. Army Corps of Engineers | Ohio River at mile 6.2 | Neville Island | 2003 | |
| Episcopal Church of the Nativity | | 1908; 1935 | O. M. Topp | 33 Alice Street | Crafton | 2000 | |
| Episcopal Church of the Redeemer | | 1937 | E. Donald Robb | 5700 Forbes Avenue | Squirrel Hill | 1998 | |
| Express House | | 1900 c. | | Station Square | South Shore | 1978 | |
| Falconhurst Apartments (Star Apartments) | | 1904–05 | James A. Wilson, builder | 724 Kelly Avenue | Wilkinsburg | 2016 | |
| Fay Bear house | | c. 1950 | Peter Berndtson and Cornelia Brierly | 125 Lutz Lane | West Mifflin | 2014 | |
| Federal Reserve Bank of Cleveland, Pittsburgh Branch | | 1930–33 | Walker & Weeks, Henry Hornbostel, and Eric Fisher Wood | 717 Grant Street | Downtown | 2001 | |
| William T. Fife house | | 1832; c. 1890 addition; 1935 | Louis S. Stevens | 2421 Old Washington Road | Upper Saint Clair | 2016 | |
| Fifth Avenue High School | | 1894 | Edward Stotz | Fifth Avenue and Miltenberger Street | Bluff, the | 1998 | |
| F. Esther Fineman house | | 1952 | Peter Berndtson and Cornelia Brierly | 4742 Coleridge Street | Stanton Heights | 1989 | |
| First Associate Reformed Church | | 1854 | | 20 South Fourteenth Street | South Side | 1983 | |
| First Baptist Church | | 1912 | Bertram Goodhue | Bellefield Avenue and Bayard Street | Oakland | 1970 | |
| First Church of Christ Scientist | | 1905 | Solon Spencer Beman | 635 Clyde Street | Shadyside | 1977 | |
| First English Evangelical Lutheran Church | | 1888 | Andrew Peebles | 615 Grant Street | Downtown | 1975 | |
| First Hungarian Reformed Church | | 1904 | Titus de Bobula | 221 Johnston Street | Hazelwood | 1995 | |
| First Muslim Mosque of Pittsburgh (Wylie Avenue Branch, Carnegie Library of Pittsburgh) | | 1899 | Alden & Harlow | 1911 Wylie Avenue | Hill District | 2012 | |
| First National Bank of Pitcairn (now commercial/rental) | | 1910 c. | Kiehnel and Elliott | 500 Second Street | Pitcairn | 2007 | |
| First Presbyterian Church | | 1903 | Theophilus Parsons Chandler Jr. | 320 Sixth Avenue | Downtown | 1970 | |
| First Presbyterian Church of Edgewood | | 1918 | Thomas Hannah with Cram & Ferguson | 120 East Swissvale Avenue | Edgewood | 1987 | |
| First United Methodist Church | | 1893 | Weary & Kramer | Centre and Aiken Avenues, and Baum Boulevard | Bloomfield | 1974 | |
| First United Methodist Church | | 1889 | Longfellow, Alden & Harlow | Parker Avenue at Library Street | Braddock | 1981 | Designation/plaque withdrawn |
| First United Methodist Church of McKeesport | | 1925 | Charles W. Bolton & Son (Philadelphia) | Cornell Street and Versailles Avenue | McKeesport | 2012 | |
| First United Methodist Church of Wilmerding | | 1913–15 | C. W. Bier | 400 Westinghouse Avenue | Wilmerding | 2003 | |
| First United Presbyterian Church | | 1893 | | 725 Parker Avenue | Braddock | 1983 | |
| Flatiron Building | | 1875 c. | | Beaver and Division Streets | Sewickley | 1978 | |
| Forbes Field wall: remnant | | 1909 | Charles Wellford Leavitt | Roberto Clemente Drive | Oakland | 1977 | |
| The Forsythe Home | | 1850 | | 920 Forsythe Road | Carnegie | 2001 | |
| Fort Pitt Blockhouse | | 1764 | | Point State Park | Downtown | 2008 | |
| Fort Pitt Boulevard | | Between 1850 and 1890 | | between Wood and Market Streets ("Firstside") | Downtown | 1992 | |
| Fort Pitt Elementary School | | 1905; 1910 | Charles M. Bartberger (1905); Edward M. Bartberger (1910) | 5101 Hillcrest Street | Garfield | 2002 | |
| Fortieth Street (Washington Crossing) Bridge | | 1924 | Benno Janssen, architect, and Charles S. Davis, engineer | Fortieth Street over the Allegheny River | Lawrenceville and Millvale | 2004 | |
| Stephen Collins Foster Memorial | | 1937 | Charles Klauder | University of Pittsburgh | Oakland | 1973 | |
| Four Gateway Center and The Plaza at Gateway Center (Equitable Plaza) | | 1960 (building), 1962 (plaza) | Harrison & Abramovitz (building); Schell & Deeter (plaza); Simonds & Simonds, landscape architects (plaza) | 444 Liberty Avenue | Downtown | 2014 | |
| The Four Sisters' House | | 1872 | Zehu P. Smith, builder | 310 Peebles Street | Sewickley | 2014 | |
| Fourth Avenue National Register District | | c. 1900 | | Fourth Avenue | Downtown | 1989, 2012 | |
| Fox Chapel Golf Club | | 1924–25; remodeled and enlarged 1931; golf course designed 1925 | Alden & Harlow, architects 1924–1925; Brandon Smith, remodeled and enlarged 1931; Seth Raynor, golf course designer 1925 | 426 Fox Chapel Road | Fox Chapel | 2007 | |
| Freight House | | 1897 | | Station Square | South Shore | 1979 | |
| John Frew House | | c. 1790; addition c. 1840 | | 105 Sterrett St. | Westwood | 1984 | |
| Frick Building | | 1902 | D. H. Burnham & Company | Grant Street and Fifth Avenue | Downtown | 1974 | |
| Frick International Studies Academy (Henry Clay Frick Training School for Teachers) | | 1927 | Ingham & Boyd | Thackeray Street near Fifth Avenue | Oakland | 2002 | |
| Friendship Elementary School | | 1899 | Charles M. Bartberger | Friendship Avenue and Graham Street | Friendship | 1998 | |
| Fulton Academy of Science (Fulton Elementary School) | | 1894, 1900, and 1929 | Charles M. Bartberger (1894 and 1900 portions); Maximilian Nirdlinger (1929 addition) | Hampton and North St. Clair Streets | Highland Park | 2002 | |
| Gardner Steel Conference Center, University of Pittsburgh (Central Turnverein) | | 1911-12 | Kiehnel and Elliott | 130 Thackeray Street | Oakland | 2007 | |
| Gardner-Bailey House | | 1864 | | 124 West Swissvale Avenue | Edgewood | 1984 | |
| Garfield-Scott house | | 1964 | Peter Berndtson | 5148 Rosecrest Place | Stanton Heights | 1989 | |
| The Gatehouse | | 1916 | | Station Square | South Shore | 1984 | |
| Mr. & Mrs. David Giles house | | 1952 | Peter Berndtson and Cornelia Brierly | 1 Saxman Drive | Latrobe | 2012 | |
| Gilfillan Farm House | | 1857 | | 1950 Washington Road | Upper St. Clair | 2001 | |
| Gimbel Brothers Department Store (Heinz 57 Center) | | 1914 | Starrett & van Vleck | 339 Sixth Avenue | Downtown | 1982 | |
| Glenshaw Railroad Station | | 1915 | | Route 8, Fall Run Park | Shaler Township | 1975 | Demolished |
| Glenshaw Valley Presbyterian Church | | 1885 | | Butler Plank Road | Shaler Township | 1972 | |
| Grace Episcopal Church | | 1926 | J. Stewart Jr. | Bertha and Sycamore Streets | Mount Washington | 1971 | |
| Grace United Methodist Church | | 1872 | | 1512 North Canal Street | Sharpsburg | 1977 | |
| Graff Building | | 1912 | | 736 North Avenue | Wilkinsburg | 1979 | |
| Graham house | | 1840 c. | | 208 Twin Oaks Drive | Ross Township | 1971 | |
| Granite Building (German National Bank) | | 1890 | Bickel & Brennan | 313 Sixth Avenue | Downtown | 1987 | |
| Great Stone Wall, Allegheny Reservoir | | 1848 | | | Troy Hill | 1979 | |
| Greenfield Elementary School | | 1916–23 | Kiehnel and Elliott | 1 Alger Street | Greenfield | 1998 (plaque was awarded conditionally) | |
| Greenstone United Methodist Church | | 1906 | | 939 California Avenue | Avalon | 2000 | |
| Lord Griffith house | | 1902 | Charles Barton Keen | 208 Chestnut Road | Edgeworth | 1975 | |
| Grotto | | 1928–32 | Slovak Franciscans, builders | Oak Street and S. Starr Avenue | Avalon | 2002 | |
| Gulf Building | | 1932 | Trowbridge & Livingston | Seventh Avenue and Grant Street | Downtown | 1973 | |
| Gwinner-Harter House | | 1870 c., 1911; restorations 1986, 1996 | Frederick J. Osterling | Fifth and Amberson Avenues | Shadyside | 2000 | |
| Skibo Gymnasium | | 1923, 1932 | Henry Hornbostel | Between Forbes Avenue and Frew Street, Carnegie Mellon University | Squirrel Hill | 2000 | |
| The Half Dingle (Stanley Marshall) | | 1964 | Peter Berndtson | 183 Gilkeson Road | Mount Lebanon | 1989 | |
| Haller-Bursztynowicz house | | 1890 c. | | 5738 Northumberland Street | Squirrel Hill | 1972 | |
| Hamburg Hall (U.S. Bureau of Mines) | | 1915 | Henry Hornbostel | 4800 Forbes Avenue, Carnegie Mellon University | Squirrel Hill | 2000 | |
| Hamerschlag Hall (Machinery Hall) | | 1906, 1914 | Palmer & Hornbostel | Between Forbes Avenue and Frew Street, Carnegie Mellon University | Squirrel Hill | 2000 | |
| Hampton Hall | | 1926 c. | | 166 North Dithridge Street | Oakland | 1985 | |
| Hampton-Kelly house | | 1852 | Joseph W. Kerr? | 102 Rockridge Road (Evergreen Hamlet) | Ross Township | 1975 | |
| Harbaugh-Grafflin house | | 1866 | Tracy Bruce, builder | 604 Maple Lane | Sewickley | 1975 | Demolished |
| Hartley-Rose Building | | 1907 | Edward Stotz | 425 First Avenue | Downtown | 1985 | |
| Hartwood Farms | | 1929 (House) | Alfred Hopkins | Saxonburg Boulevard | Indiana Township | 1997 | |
| Hawker house | | 19th century (mid) | | 120 Nelson Run Road | Ross Township | 1971 | |
| Hays house | | 1870 c. | | Hardin Place off Whitaker Road | Munhall | 1975 | |
| Heathside Cottage | | 1855 | | Catoma and Myler Streets | Fineview | 2000 | |
| Heinz Hall for the Performing Arts (Penn Theatre) | | 1926, 1971 | Rapp and Rapp | Sixth Street and Penn Avenue | Downtown | 1971 | |
| Heinz Lofts (five H. J. Heinz Company buildings) | | 1913–27 | H. J. Heinz Company, R. M. Trimble, and Albert Kahn | Progress Street | Troy Hill | 2007 | |
| Heinz Memorial Chapel | | 1938 | Charles Klauder | University of Pittsburgh | Oakland | 1973 | |
| Hellmund house | | 1916 | Frederick G. Scheibler Jr. | 7510 Trevanion Avenue | Swissvale | 1984 | |
| Henderson Hall | | 1916 | Henry Hornbostel | Between Forbes Avenue and Frew Street, Carnegie Mellon University | Squirrel Hill | 2000 | |
| Henderson-Metz House ("the Castle") | | 1860 c. | | 1516 Warren Street | Fineview | 1976 | |
| Hendricks-Murray house | | 1874 c. | | 319 South Lexington Avenue | Point Breeze | 1981 | |
| Heppenstall, Samuel (estate) | | 1885 c. | | 610 Lincoln Avenue | Larimer | 1992 | |
| Herron Hill Park (Robert E. Williams Memorial Park) | | 1889 | | | Hill, the | 1989 | |
| Highland Park (the Park) | | 1889 (begun) | | | Highland Park | 1989 | |
| Howard J. Hill house | | 1835 c. | | 231 Nelson Run Road | Ross Township | 1971 | |
| Highland Towers | | 1913 | Frederick G. Scheibler Jr. | 340 South Highland Avenue | Shadyside | 1976 | |
| The Highwood | | 1929–30 | R. Garey Dickson | 372 S. Highland Avenue | Shadyside | 2003 | |
| Hiland Presbyterian Church | | 1940 and earlier | | 845 Perry Highway | Ross Township | 1976 | |
| Hill-McCallam-Davies house | | 1852 | Joseph W. Kerr | 164 Rockridge Road, Evergreen Hamlet | Ross Township | 1971 | |
| Holleman house | | 1920 | | 3200 Brownsville Road | Brentwood | 1993 | |
| Jane Holmes Residence and Gardens | | 1869 | Barr & Moser | 441 Swissvale Avenue | Wilkinsburg | 2004 | |
| Holy Rosary Roman Catholic Church | | 1928 | Ralph Adams Cram | Lang Avenue and Kelly Street | Homewood | 1970 | |
| Holy Virgin Russian Orthodox Greek Catholic Church | | 1920 | | 214 Mansfield Boulevard | Carnegie | 2001 | |
| Homestead High Level Bridge (Homestead Grays Bridge) | | 1935–37 | George S. Richardson, chief engineer | Monongahela River at Mile 7 | Homestead and Squirrel Hill | 2001 | |
| Homewood Cemetery | | 1878 (incorporated) | | Dallas and Aylesboro Avenues | Point Breeze | 1992 | |
| Honor Bilt house, "The Kilbourne" model, 1928 | | 1921–29 | Sears, Roebuck & Company | 201 Iola Street | Shaler Township | 2016 | |
| Honor Bilt houses (an example of) | | 1924 | | 804 Walnut Street | Edgewood | 1990 | |
| Joseph Horne Company Department Store | | 1900, 1923 | Peabody & Stearns (1900, 1923) and William S. Fraser (1900) | Penn Avenue and Stanwix Street | Downtown | 1982 | |
| Joseph Horne House | | 1889 | Longfellow, Alden & Harlow | 838 North Lincoln Avenue | Allegheny West | 1995 | |
| Hot Metal Street Bridge (Monongahela Connecting Bridge) and former Hot Metal Bridge | | 1900 (Hot Metal Bridge) and 1904 (Monongahela Connecting Bridge) | Monongahela Connecting Railroad and Jones & Laughlin, Ltd., engineers | Monongahela River at Mile 3 | Oakland and South Side | 2009 | |
| Howe-Childs Gatehouse, Chatham College ("Willow Cottage") | | 1860 c. | | Fifth Avenue and Woodland Road | Squirrel Hill | 2004 | |
| Howe Springs | | 1911–12 | William H. Van Tine | Fifth Avenue and North Woodland Road | Squirrel Hill | 2016 | |
| Hunt Armory | | 1911, 1916, 1919 | Joseph F. Kuntz, architect for W.G. Wilkins Company | 324 Emerson Street | Shadyside | 2014 | |
| Husler Building | | 1896 | Samuel T. McClarren | 1 West Main Street | Carnegie | 2004 | |
| Hyeholde | | 1931–38, 1952 | William Kryskill, designer | Coraopolis Heights Road, near Beaver Grade Road | Moon Township | 2000 | |
| Immaculate Heart of Mary Church | | 1904 | William P. Ginther | 3058 Brereton Avenue | Polish Hill | 1970 | |
| Ingram Elementary School | | 1914 | Press C. Dowler | Vancouver Avenue | Ingram | 1988 | |
| Iron fence from "The Maples" (C. L. Magee estate) | | 1890 c. | | Forbes Avenue and Halkett Street | Oakland | 1983 | |
| Arthur Jeffrey house | | 1947 | Peter Berndtson and Cornelia Brierly | 8235 Foxridge Road | Allison Park | 1989 | |
| Jenkins Arcade | | 1913 | O. M. Topp | Liberty Avenue at Fifth Street | Downtown | 1972 | Demolished |
| Jerusalem Baptist Church | | 1864 | | Steuben and Sanctus Streets | West End | 1982 | |
| Jones Hall, Community College of Allegheny County (B.F. Jones Jr. house) | | 1908 c. | Rutan & Russell | Ridge Avenue and Brighton Road | Allegheny West | 1970, 1990 | |
| Jones house | | 1915 | | 1831 Ardmore Boulevard | Forest Hills | 1979 | |
| Joseph Katz house (McComb house) | | 1950 | Peter Berndtson and Cornelia Brierly | 111 Lutz Lane | West Mifflin | 1989 | |
| Kaufmann Auditorium | | 1928 | Edward Stotz | 1835 Centre Avenue | Hill, the | 1998 | |
| Kaufmann's Department Store and Clock (Macy's) | | 1898, 1913 | Charles Bickel and Janssen & Abbott | Fifth Avenue and Smithfield Street | Downtown | 1981 | |
| Kennywood Park: Casino | | 1899 | | Kennywood | West Mifflin | 1982 | |
| Kennywood Park: Grand Carousel | | 1926 c. | William H. Dentzel | Kennywood | West Mifflin Township | 1976 | |
| Kennywood Park: the Racer | | 1927 | John A. Miller, designer | Kennywood | West Mifflin Township | 1995 | |
| Thomas Keown house | | 1842–50 | | 272 West Ingomar Road | McCandless Township | 1979 | |
| Allen M. Klages house | | 1923 | Frederick G. Scheibler Jr. | 5525 Beverly Place | Highland Park | 1995 | |
| Knoxville Elementary School (Knoxville Junior High School) | | 1927; 1931 and 1935 | Press C. Dowler (1927 and 1931); Marion M. Steen (1935) | 324 Charles Street | Knoxville | 2002 | |
| Kopp Glass, Inc. | | 1899 | | 2108 Palmer Street | Swissvale | 2009 | |
| Koppers Building | | 1929 | Graham, Anderson, Probst & White | Seventh Avenue and Grant Street | Downtown | 1973 | |
| Kramer house | | 1854 c. | | 119 Kramer Street | Sewickley | 1981 | Demolished |
| Kuykendall-Forsyth-Reed farm | | 1768, 1852 | | 561 State Route 885 | Jefferson Township | 1979 | |
| "La Tourelle" (Edgar J. Kaufmann house) | | 1924 | Janssen & Cocken | 8 La Tourelle Lane | Fox Chapel | 2003 | |
| Mr. & Mrs. Jack Landis house | | 1957 | Peter Berndtson and Cornelia Brierly | 2717 Mount Royal Road | Squirrel Hill | 2012 | |
| Langley High School (City of Pittsburgh Public Schools) | | 1900 c., 1929 | MacClure & Spahr | Sheraden Boulevard and Chartiers Avenue | Sheraden | 2001 | |
| Lark Inn | | 1798 | | 634 Beaver Road | Leetsdale | 1979 | |
| Lawrence Hall, Point Park University (Keystone Athletic Club) | | 1927–29 | Benno Janssen for Janssen & Cocken | Wood Street at Third Avenue | Downtown | 2007 | |
| Lebanon Presbyterian Church | | 1871 | | 2800 Old Elizabeth Road | West Mifflin | 1975 | Demolished |
| Lemington Elementary School (City of Pittsburgh Public Schools) | | 1937 | Marion M. Steen, Edward J. Weber, Navarro Corp. | 7061 Lemington Avenue | Lincoln-Lemington-Belmar | 2001 | |
| Letsche Education Center (Letsche School) | | 1905; 1941 | unknown, 1905; Marion M. Steen, 1941 | 1530 Cliff Street | Hill, the | 2002 | |
| Letter Carriers' Local 84 Union Hall (New Brighton Theatre) | | 1928 | Rubin & VeShancey | 841 California Avenue | California-Kirkbride | 2014 | |
| Liberty Tunnels Ventilating Plant | | 1928 | Stanley L. Roush | 201 Secane Avenue | Mt. Washington | 2003 | |
| Isaac Lightner House | | 1833 | | 2407 Mount Royal Boulevard | Shaler Township | 1976 | |
| Lincoln Avenue Viaduct | | 1905 | City of Pittsburgh Bureau of Construction, engineers | Lincoln Avenue over Washington Boulevard | Lincoln-Lemington-Belmar and Larimer | 2003 | |
| Lincoln Elementary School (City of Pittsburgh Public Schools) | | 1931 | Thomas Pringle, Oliver J. Robling | 328 Lincoln Avenue (near the corner of Lincoln and Frankstown Avenues) | Larimer | 2001 | |
| Linden Elementary School | | 1903; 1927; 1960 | Ellsworth Dean, 1903; Pringle & Robling, 1927 | Linden Avenue near Beechwood Boulevard | Point Breeze | 2002 | |
| Linwood Apartments | | 1907 | Frederick G. Scheibler Jr. | 6801 McPherson Boulevard | Point Breeze | 1976 | |
| Saul Lipkind house | | 1954 | Peter Berndtson and Cornelia Brierly | 1137 Onondago Street | Swisshelm Park | 1989 | |
| Longue Vue Club | | 1925 | Janssen & Cocken | Oakwood Road | Penn Hills | 1985 | |
| "Lyndhurst" estate wall | | 1885 c. | | Lyndhurst Drive | Point Breeze | 1984 | |
| Lysle Boulevard Bridge (Jerome Street Bridge) | | 1937 | | Youghiogheny River near the Monongahela River | McKeesport | 2004 | |
| Madison Elementary School (formerly Minersville Public School) (City of Pittsburgh Public Schools) | | 1902, 1929 | Ulysses J. L. Peoples, Pringle & Robling | 3401 Milwaukee Street (at the corner of Milwaukee and Orion Streets) | Hill District | 2001 | |
| H. P. Malick house | | 1900 c. | | 3406 Brownsville Road | Brentwood | 1995 | |
| Manchester | | 1838 (platted) | | district and Liverpool Street | North Side | 1976 | |
| Mansions on Fifth (Willis F. McCook house and Mrs. Edgar McCook Reed house) | | 1905-07 | Carpenter & Crocker | 5105 Fifth Avenue (Willis F. McCook house) and 925 Amberson Avenue (Mrs. Edgar McCook Reed house) | Shadyside | 2009 | |
| Margaret Morrison Carnegie Hall (Margaret Morrison Carnegie School for Women) | | 1906, 1914 | Palmer & Hornbostel | Between Forbes Avenue and Frew Street, Carnegie Mellon University | Squirrel Hill | 2000 | |
| Market at Fifth (consists of four buildings: former Regal Shoe Company building, 489-491 Market Street, and the former John R. Thompson building) | | 1870s (489-491 Market Street), 1908-09 (Regal Shoe building), 1927 (Thompson building), remodeled 2007-09 | Alden & Harlow (Regal Shoe building); Landmarks Design Associates Architects (remodeled 2007–2009) | Fifth Avenue at Market Street and Graeme Street | Downtown | 2009 | |
| Market Square Place (portion) (G.C. Murphy Store No. 12) | | 1930 | Harold E. Crosby | 219 Forbes Avenue | Downtown | 2014 | |
| Masonic Building | | 1909 | Charles F. Reed & Bros. Lumber Co., builders | 322 Center Avenue | Verona | 2009 | |
| Mauro water tower | | 1900 c. | | Blackburn Road | Sewickley Heights | 1978 | |
| McCleary Elementary School | | 1900 | Ulysses J. L. Peoples | 201 McCandless Avenue | Lawrenceville | 2002 | |
| McGill Hall | | 1916 | Henry Hornbostel | Between Forbes Avenue and Frew Street, Carnegie Mellon University | Squirrel Hill | 2000 | |
| McGinley house | | 1804 | | McGinley Road | Monroeville | 1977 | |
| McGuffey Building (formerly, Glenshaw School) | | 1882 | | 1493 Butler Plank Road | Shaler Township | 1979 | |
| McKees Rocks Bridge | | 1930–32 | George S. Richardson, engineer | Ohio River at mile 3.3 | McKees Rocks | 2003 | |
| McKeesport National Bank | | 1891 | Longfellow, Alden & Harlow | Fifth Avenue and Sinclair Street | McKeesport | 1981 | |
| McKeesport Waterworks | | 1908, 1925 | | Railroad Street at the Fifteenth Street Bridge | McKeesport | 1982 | |
| "Meado'cots" | | 1912 | Frederick G. Scheibler Jr. | 425-47 Rosedale Street | Homewood | 2001 | |
| Mellon Bank | | 1924 | Trowbridge & Livingston | Fifth Avenue and Smithfield Street | Downtown | 1976 | Interior destroyed |
| Andrew W. Mellon house | | 1897; after 1917 | MacClure & Spahr | Woodland Road | Shadyside | 2001 | |
| Mellon Institute of Industrial Research | | 1931–37 | Janssen & Cocken | 4400 Fifth Avenue | Oakland | 2003 | |
| Mellon Park | | 1943 | | Fifth Avenue (at the corner of Fifth and Shady Avenues) | Point Breeze and Shadyside | 1982 | |
| Mellon Square | | 1954–55 | James A. Mitchell for Mitchell & Ritchey, architects; Simonds & Simonds, landscape architects | Between Smithfield Street and William Penn Place and Oliver and Sixth Avenues | Downtown | 2007 | |
| C. C. Mellor Library and Edgewood Club | | 1914 | Edward B. Lee | Pennwood and West Swissvale Avenues | Edgewood | 2000 | |
| Mexican War Streets National Register District | | 1850–1900 c. | | | North Side | 1988 | |
| Mifflin Elementary School (City of Pittsburgh Public Schools) | | 1932 | Link, Weber & Bowers; Edward J. Weber | 1290 Mifflin Road | Lincoln Place | 2001 | |
| Miller African-Centered Academy (Miller Elementary School) | | 1905; 1939 | John Blair Elliott, 1905; Marion M. Steen, 1939 | 61 Reed Street | Hill, the | 2002 | |
| Miller–Cole house | | 1952 | Peter Berndtson and Cornelia Brierly | 629 Oakhill Lane | Greensburg | 2012 | |
| Oliver Miller Homestead | | 1808, 1830 | | Stone Manse Drive east of Corrigan Drive, South Park | South Park Township | 1979 | |
| The Miller House | | 1905 | Frederick G. Scheibler Jr. | 7506 Trevanion Avenue | Swissvale | 2000 | |
| Andrew S. Miller House | | 1902 | Century Architectural and Engineering Company | 366 Lincoln Avenue | Bellevue | 2018 | |
| Miller-Zorn-Bush house | | 1840–1850 c. | | 503 Hill Street | Sewickley | 2009 | |
| Monongahela Incline | | 1870 (opened) | John Endres and Samuel Diescher | Grandview Avenue and Wyoming Street and West Carson Street near Smithfield Street | Mount Washington and Station Square | 1970 | |
| Montgomery house | | 1877 | | 424 Shady Avenue | Shadyside | 1979 | |
| Moore Elementary School | | 1914, 1941, 1997 | | 3809 Dalewood Avenue | Brentwood | 1997 | |
| Moreland-Hoffstot House | | 1914 | Paul Irwin | 5057 Fifth Avenue | Shadyside | 1985 | |
| Morrow Barn (Penn-Hebron Garden Club) | | 1834 | | Jefferson Road | Penn Hills | 1974 | |
| Morrow Elementary School | | 1895; additions | Samuel T. McClarren | 1611 Davis Avenue | Brighton Heights | 2002 | |
| Most Holy Name of Jesus Rectory | | 1875 c. | | 1700 Harpster Street | Troy Hill | 1983 | |
| Motor Square Garden (East Liberty Market) | | 1900 | Peabody and Stearns | Centre Avenue and Baum Boulevard | East Liberty | 1975, 1988 | |
| Mount Assisi | | 1927 | Edward J. Weber of Link, Weber & Bowers | 934 Forest Avenue | Ross Township | 2003 | |
| Mt. Lebanon Golf Course (Castle Shannon Golf Club) | | 1907-08 | George A. Ormiston, landscape architect/designer | 1000 Pine Avenue | Mt. Lebanon | 2007 | |
| Mt. Lebanon Municipal Building | | 1928–30 | William H. King Jr. | 710 Washington Road | Mt. Lebanon | 2007 | |
| Munhall Volunteer Fire Company #1 | | 1902 | | 1300 Martha Street | Munhall | 2009 | |
| Municipal Building | | 1938 | Clifford Lake | 2 Race Street | Edgewood | 1998 | |
| "Muottas" (William Walker house) | | 1904 | Alden & Harlow | Little Sewickley Creek Road 40°33′44.01″N 80°11′41.93″W | Edgeworth | 1995 | |
| Murray Hill Avenue Historic District | | 1890 (after) | | 1010–1201 Murray Hill Avenue | Squirrel Hill | 2004 | |
| Murray house | | 1830 c. | | 423 Washington Avenue | Bridgeville | 1985 | |
| Muse house | | 1820 | | 4222 Third Street | McKeesport | 2001 | |
| National Carpatho-Rusyn Cultural and Educational Center (St. John the Baptist Greek Catholic Church) | | 1903 | Titus de Bobula | 911 Dickson Street | Munhall | 1988 | |
| Natrona Bank (Sweeny Hotel and Saloon) | | 1900 | | 46-48 Chestnut Street | Natrona | 2009 | |
| Neill Log House | | 1765–1770 c. | | East Circuit Road | Schenley Park | 1970 | |
| Neville house ("Woodville") | | 1785 and after | | Route 50 | Collier Township | 1976 | |
| New Granada Theater (Pythian Temple) | | 1927–28; remodeled in 1937–38 | Louis Arnett Stuart Bellinger, 1927–28; Alfred M. Marks, 1937–38 | 2007 Centre Avenue | Hill, the | 2007 | |
| New Zion Baptist Church (Deliverance Baptist Christian Center) | | 1867 | Barr & Moser | 1304 Manhattan Street | Manchester | 1976 | |
| "Newington" | | 1816, 1823 | | Shields Lane | Edgeworth | 1976 | |
| North Park Golf Club House | | 1937 | Henry Hornbostel | Kummer Road | McCandless Township | 2003 | |
| Hulda and Louise Notz house | | 1940 | Cornelia Brierly | 120 Lutz Lane | West Mifflin | 2009 | |
| Oakmont Carnegie Library | | 1901 | Alden & Harlow | Allegheny River Boulevard | Oakmont | 1979 | |
| Oakmont Country Club | | 1904 | Edward Stotz | Hulton Road | Oakmont | 1985 | |
| Ober-Guehl house | | 1877 and later | | 1501 Lowrie Street | Troy Hill | 1985 | |
| Old Crossroads Presbyterian Church | | 1896 | | 2700 Stroschein Road | Monroeville | 1975 | |
| Old Heidelberg Apartments | | 1905, 1908 | Frederick G. Scheibler Jr. | Braddock Avenue and Waverly Street | Park Place | 1970 | |
| Old St. Luke's (St. Luke's Episcopal Church) | | 1852 | | Washington Pike and Church Street | Scott Township | 1976 | |
| Old Sewickley Train Station (Pittsburgh, Fort Wayne and Chicago Station) | | 1887 | | 20 Chadwick Street | Sewickley | 1993 | |
| Old Stone Bridge | | 1870 c. | | Near Old William Penn Highway and Beatty Road | Monroeville | 1985 | |
| Old Toll House (Rising Sun Inn) | | 1827 | | 3835 Northern Pike | Monroeville | 1975 | Demolished |
| Henry W. Oliver Building | | 1910 | D. H. Burnham & Company | Smithfield Street and Oliver Avenue | Downtown | 1974 | |
| Oliver High School (City of Pittsburgh Public Schools) | | 1925 | James T. Steen & Sons | Brighton Road and Island Avenue | Marshall-Shadeland | 2001 | |
| Osterling Studio and Office | | 1917 | Frederick J. Osterling | 228 Isabella Street | North Shore | 2004 | |
| Oyster House (Bear Tavern Site) | | 1827 (Bear Tavern Site), 1870 (Oyster House) | | Market Square | Downtown | 1971 | |
| Panther Hollow Bridge | | 1897 | Henry B. Rust, engineer | Over Panther Hollow | Schenley Park | 2000 | |
| Parkstone Dwellings | | 1922 | Frederick G. Scheibler Jr. | 6937 Penn Avenue | Point Breeze | 2001 | |
| Parkway steps | | 1936 | Works Progress Administration | Between Parkway and North Avenues | Chalfant | 2009 | |
| "Peleponesus" | | 1835 c. | | 7900 Lincoln Road | Penn Hills | 1979 | |
| Penn Brewery and Brewery Innovation Center (Eberhardt & Ober Brewery) | | 1880 c. and after, 1884 | Joseph Stillburg, architect of Stock House, 1884 | Troy Hill and Vinial Street | Troy Hill | 2000 | |
| Pennsylvania Railroad Fruit Auction & Sales Building | | 1929 | Office of Division Engineer (Pittsburgh), Pennsylvania Railroad Company | 2100 Smallman Street | Strip District | 2014 | |
| Pennsylvania Railroad Station | | 1903 | Furness, Evans & Co. | Swissvale and Maple Avenues | Edgewood | 1998 | |
| Pennsylvania Railroad Station | | 1916 | Walter H. Cookson | Hay Street at Ross Avenue | Wilkinsburg | 1976 | |
| Pennsylvania Railroad Station Rotunda | | 1898–1903 | D. H. Burnham & Company | Liberty Avenue and Grant Street | Downtown | 1991 | |
| The Pennsylvanian (Union Station) | | 1898–1903 | D. H. Burnham & Company | 1100 Liberty Avenue | Downtown | 2003 | |
| Perry Traditional Academy (City of Pittsburgh Public Schools) | | 1899 | | Perrysville Avenue and Semicir Street | Perry North | 2001 | |
| Phipps Conservatory | | 1893 | Lord & Burnham | Schenley Drive | Schenley Park | 1970 | |
| Pierce house | | 1850 (prior to) | | 88 Donna Drive | Franklin Park | 1971 | |
| Pitt Building (Americus Club) | | 1918 | Edward B. Lee | 213 Smithfield Street | Downtown | 1972 | |
| Pittsburgh Athletic Association | | 1911 | Janssen & Abbott | Fifth Avenue and Bigelow Boulevard | Oakland | 1970 | |
| Pittsburgh Ballet Theater Building | | 1900 c. | | 244 Boulevard of the Allies, 109-115 Wood Street | Downtown | 1975 | |
| Pittsburgh Brewing Company | | 1888 and after | | 3340 Liberty Avenue | Lawrenceville | 1979 | |
| Pittsburgh Center for the Arts (Arts and Crafts Center) | | 1912, 1980s | Charles Barton Keen | Fifth and Shady Avenues | Squirrel Hill | 1971 | |
| The Pittsburgh Children's Center (Gulf Research Laboratory) | | 1930 | Ludlow & Schwab | 327 Craft Avenue | Oakland | 2001 | |
| Pittsburgh Children's Museum (Allegheny [Old] Post Office) | | 1897 | William Martin Aiken | 10 Children's Way | Allegheny Center | 1971 | |
| Pittsburgh Engineer's Building (Union Trust Company) | | 1898 | D. H. Burnham & Company | 337 Fourth Avenue | Downtown | 1974 | |
| Pittsburgh Gifted Center (McKelvy School) | | 1911 | Carlton Strong | Bedford Avenue and Erin Street | Hill, the | 2002 | |
| The Pittsburgh Golf Club | | 1899; enlarged 1904 | Alden & Harlow | 5280 Northumberland Street | Squirrel Hill | 2004 | |
| Pittsburgh & Lake Erie Coraopolis Station | | 1895 | Shepley, Rutan and Coolidge | Neville Avenue and Mill Street | Coraopolis | 2012 | |
| Pittsburgh & Lake Erie Railroad Station (The Landmarks Building) | | 1901 | William George Burns | Station Square | South Shore | 1970 | |
| Pittsburgh Musical Theater (St. James School) | | 1916 | | 327 South Main Street | West End | 2014 | |
| Pittsburgh's Grand Hall at the Priory (St. Mary's German Catholic Church) | | 1854; addition 1906 | Father John Stibiel, 1854; Sidney Heckert, 1906 | Pressley and Nash Streets | East Allegheny | 2004 | |
| PNC Train Station at Greensburg (Greensburg Railroad Station, Pennsylvania Railroad) | | 1911 | William H. Cookman | 101 Ehalt Street | Greensburg | 2014 | |
| Porter Hall (School of Applied Industries) | | 1905, 1915 | Palmer & Hornbostel | Between Forbes Avenue and Frew Street, Carnegie Mellon University | Squirrel Hill | 2000 | |
| James Powers Homestead | | 1797 | | 108 White Gate Road | O'Hara Township | 2001 | |
| Prospect Elementary School | | 1931; 1936 | Marion M. Steen for James T. Steen & Sons, 1931; Marion M. Steen, 1936 | Prospect Street near Southern Avenue | Mt. Washington | 2002 | |
| Provincial House of Sisters of Divine Providence | | 1927 | John E. Kauzor | 9900 Babcock Boulevard | McCandless Township | 1984 | |
| Rankin house | | 1831 | | 1114 Rankin Road | White Oak | 1981 | |
| "Red Gables" (Frank Alden house) | | 1894 | Longfellow, Alden & Harlow | 605 Maple Lane | Edgeworth | 1995 | |
| Regional Enterprise Tower (Alcoa Building) | | 1950–53 | Harrison & Abramovitz | 425 Sixth Avenue | Downtown | 2004 | |
| Renaissance Pittsburgh Hotel (Fulton Building) | | 1906 | Grosvenor Atterbury | 107 Sixth Street | Downtown | 2003 | |
| Lydia A. Riesmeyer house | | 1914 | Richard Kiehnel, Kiehnel and Elliott | 5818 Aylesboro Avenue | Squirrel Hill | 2014 | |
| Riverview United Presbyterian Church (Watson Memorial Presbyterian Church) | | 1907 | Allison & Allison | 3505 Perrysville Avenue | Perry North | 2009 | |
| "Robin Hill" | | 1926 | Henry Gilchrist | 949 Thorn Run Road | Moon Township | 2004 | |
| Rodef Shalom Congregation | | 1906 | Henry Hornbostel | Fifth and Morewood Avenues | Shadyside | 1971 | |
| Rogers School for the Creative and Performing Arts | | 1914 | Janssen & Abbott | 5525 Columbo Avenue | Garfield | 2002 | |
| Roslyn Place (entire fabric) | | 1913 (begun) | | Off 5400 block, Ellsworth Avenue | Shadyside | 2000 | |
| Roslyn Place pavement | | 1913 and after | | Off 5400 block, Ellsworth Avenue | Shadyside | 1976 | |
| Ross-Tooke house | | 1835 c. | | 2073 Old State Road | Pine Township | 1979 | |
| Round Hill United Presbyterian Church | | 1804 | | 2150 Round Hill Church Road | Elizabeth Township | 1979 | |
| Marius Rousseau house | | 1906 | Marius Rousseau | 100 Watkins Avenue | Bellevue | 2016 | |
| Royal York Apartments | | 1937 | Frederick Stanton | 3955 Bigelow Boulevard | Oakland | 2000 | |
| J. Horace Rudy house | | 1901 | Samuel Feltyberger, builder | 920 North Sheridan Avenue | Highland Park | 2016 | |
| Sacred Heart Roman Catholic Church | | 1924–53 | Carlton Strong | Walnut Street and Shady Avenue | Shadyside | 1970 | |
| St. Adalbert Church | | 1889 | | South Fifteenth Street | South Side | 1984 | |
| St. Andrew's Episcopal Church complex | | 1909 | Carpenter & Crocker | 5801 Hampton Street | Highland Park | 2012 | |
| St. Anselm's Roman Catholic Church | | 1924 | Albert F. Link | 7446 McClure Avenue | Swissvale | 2000 | |
| Saint Augustine's Church | | 1899 | Rutan & Russell and John T. Comès | 37th and Bandera Streets | Lawrenceville | 1998 | |
| St. Basil's Roman Catholic Church | | 1923 | Herman J. Lang | 1735 Brownsville Road | Carrick | 2000 | |
| St. Bernard's Roman Catholic Church | | 1933–47 | William Richard Perry | 311 Washington Road | Mount Lebanon | 1988 | |
| St. Boniface Church | | 1926 | Albert F. Link | East Street at Royal Street | East Street Valley | 1974 | |
| St. Colman's School | | 1928 | Link, Weber & Bowers | Hunter and Thompson Streets | Turtle Creek | 1997 | |
| St. James Terrace | | 1915 | John E. Born, builder | 5300–5312 St. James Terrace | Shadyside | 2012 | |
| St. John the Baptist Ukrainian Catholic Church | | 1895, 1917 | | West Carson and South Seventh Streets | South Side | 1968 | |
| St. Josaphat's Roman Catholic Church | | 1909–16 | John Theodore Comes | 2301 Mission Street | South Side Slopes | 2003 | |
| St. Joseph's Roman Catholic Church | | 1886 | Adolf Druiding | 4712 Liberty Avenue | Bloomfield | 1987 | |
| St. Luke's Evangelical Lutheran Church | | 1927 | William H. King Jr. | 305 Center Avenue | West View | 2003 | |
| St. Margaret's Hospital Chapel | | 1894 | Ernest Flagg | Forty-sixth Street | Lawrenceville | 1973 | Demolished |
| St. Mary Magdalene Church | | 1895; 1936 | Frederick C. Sauer, Button & MacLean | East Tenth Avenue and Amity Street | Homestead | 2001 | |
| St. Mary of the Mount Church | | 1896 | Frederick C. Sauer | 403 Grandview Avenue | Mount Washington | 1998 (plaque was awarded conditionally and given in 1999) | |
| St. Mary's Church | | 1874 | James Sylvester Devlin | 340 46th Street | Lawrenceville | 1971 | |
| St. Mary's Priory | | 1888 | Henry Moser | 614 Pressley Street | East Allegheny | 1988 | |
| St. Mary's Ukrainian Orthodox Church | | 1922 | Carlton Strong | 116 Ella Street | McKees Rocks | 2000 | |
| St. Matthew's A.M.E. Zion Church | | 1910 c. | | Thorn and Walnut Streets | Sewickley | 1997 | |
| St. Michael Archangel Church | | 1927 | Comes, Perry & McMullen | E. Ninth Avenue and Liberty Place | Munhall | 2001 | |
| St. Michael the Archangel Church | | 1851 | John Anderson and John L. Richards, designers | Fifth and Bayard Streets | Elizabeth | 1987 | Demolished |
| St. Michael the Archangel Church (Angel's Arms Condominiums) | | 1861 | Charles Bartberger | One Pius Street | South Side Slopes | 1970 | |
| St. Michael's Russian Orthodox Greek Catholic Church | | 1903–1910 | | 43 Reed Street | Hill, the | 2001 | Demolished |
| St. Nicholas Cathedral (First Congregational Church) | | 1904 | Thomas Hannah | 419 South Dithridge Street | Oakland | 1982 | |
| St. Nicholas Croatian Church | | 1900 | Frederick C. Sauer | 24 Maryland Avenue | Millvale | 1979 | |
| St. Nicholas Roman Catholic Church | | 1900 | Frederick C. Sauer | 1326 East Ohio Street | Troy Hill | 1976 | Demolished |
| St. Paul Baptist Church | | 1887 | Lawrence B. Valk | 6701 Penn Avenue | Point Breeze | 1998 | |
| St. Paul of the Cross Monastery | | 1854 and later | Charles Bartberger | 143 Monastery Street | South Side Slopes | 1982 | |
| St. Paul's Roman Catholic Cathedral | | 1906 | Egan & Prindeville | Fifth Avenue and Craig Street | Oakland | 1975 | |
| St. Peter's Episcopal Church | | 1852 | John Norman | Forbes and Craft Avenues | Oakland | 1972 | Demolished |
| St. Peter's Evangelical and Reformed Church | | 1889 | | 6378 Centre Avenue | East Liberty | 1975 | |
| St. Peter's Roman Catholic Church | | 1874 | Andrew Peebles | 720 Arch Street | Allegheny Center | 1972 | |
| St. Philip Roman Catholic Church | | 1906 | William P. Ginther | West Crafton and Broadhead Avenues | Crafton | 1970 | |
| St. Stanislaus Kostka Church | | 1891 | Frederick C. Sauer | Smallman and Twenty-first Streets | Strip District | 1970 | |
| St. Stephen's Episcopal Church | | 1903 | George Nattress & Sons | 600 Pitt Street | Wilkinsburg | 2004 | |
| St. Thomas Memorial Episcopal Church and Parish Hall | | 1905–07 (church); 1897 (parish hall) | Robert Maurice Trimble (church); William Braithwait (parish hall) | 378 Delaware Avenue | Oakmont | 2016 | |
| St. Thomas Roman Catholic Church | | 1904 | | 1001 Braddock Avenue | Braddock | 1983 | Demolished |
| Saints Peter and Paul Roman Catholic Church | | 1891 | Adolphus Druiding and John T. Comès | 130 Larimer Avenue | East Liberty | 1983 | |
| St. Peter & St. Paul Ukrainian Orthodox Greek Catholic Church | | 1906 | Titus de Bobula | 200 Walnut Street | Carnegie | 1977 | |
| Salk Hall (Municipal Hospital) | | 1940 | Richard Irving and Theodore Eicholz | University of Pittsburgh, 3501 Terrace Street | Oakland | 1972 | |
| Schenley Apartments | | 1922 | Henry Hornbostel, with Rutan & Russell | Fifth Avenue opposite Thackeray Street | Oakland | 1972, 2012 | |
| Schenley Bridge | | 1897 | Henry B. Rust | Schenley Plaza to Schenley Park over Junction Hollow | Oakland | 2001 | |
| Schenley Farms District | | 1905 (planned) | | Bigelow Boulevard and Parkman Avenue | Oakland | 1976 | |
| Schenley High School | | 1915–16 | Edward Stotz | Bigelow Boulevard and Centre Avenue | Oakland | 1992 | |
| Schenley Hotel | | 1898 | Rutan & Russell | Bigelow Boulevard and Forbes Avenue | Oakland | 1984 | |
| Schenley Park | | 1889 (begun) | | | Oakland | 1989 | |
| Schenley Park Visitors Center | | 1910 | Rutan & Russell | 101 Panther Hollow Road | Schenley Park | 2004 | |
| Schiller Classical Academy (formerly Schiller School) (City of Pittsburgh Public Schools) | | 1939 | Marion M. Steen, Edward J. Weber, Edward Crump Jr., Inc. | 1018 Peralta Street | East Allegheny | 2001 | |
| Schiller house | | 1807, 1846 | | 123 Faybern Drive | Penn Hills | 1976 | |
| Schoolhouse Arts Center | | 1905 | | South Park Road at Park Avenue | Bethel Park | 1990 | |
| Charles Schwab house | | 1893 | Frederick J. Osterling | 541 Jones Avenue | North Braddock | 1985 | |
| Scobell Hall | | 1918 | Henry Hornbostel | Between Forbes Avenue and Frew Street, Carnegie Mellon University | Squirrel Hill | 2000 | |
| Second Presbyterian Church of Wilkinsburg | | 1905; 1910; 1928 | F. Hoffman & Co., 1905; T. Lawrence Wolfe, 1910 | 740 South Avenue | Wilkinsburg | 2002 | |
| Seldom Seen Arch | | 1903 | Boller & Hodge, engineers | Saw Mill Run Boulevard east of Woodruff Street 40°25′31.6194″N 80°1′14.8722″W | Mount Washington | 2001 | |
| Sellers-Carnahan House | | 1858 | | Shady Avenue and Walnut Street | Shadyside | 1969 | |
| Sellers-Grove house | | 1851 c. | | 161 Rockridge Road, Evergreen Hamlet | Ross Township | 1971 | |
| Settler's Cabin (Walker-Ewing-Glass house) | | 1780s?, 1855 c. | | Settler's Cabin Park | North Fayette | 1970 | |
| Sewickley Post Office | | 1910 | James Knox Taylor | Bank and Broad Streets | Sewickley | 2000 | |
| Sewickley Presbyterian Church | | 1861 | Joseph W. Kerr | 414 Grant Street | Sewickley | 1979 | |
| Sewickley Public Library | | 1923; annex 2000 | Henry D. Gilchrist, 1923 | Thorn and Broad Streets | Sewickley | 2003 | |
| Shadyside Presbyterian Church | | 1889, 1892 | Shepley, Rutan & Coolidge | Amberson Avenue and Westminster Place | Shadyside | 1971 | |
| James Wilson Shaw house | | 1827 | | 1825 Mount Royal Boulevard | Shaler Township | 1979 | |
| Thomas Shaw house | | 1824, 1832 | | 1491 Butler Plank Road | Shaler Township | 1984 | |
| Shaw-Tatom house | | 1824, 1832 | | 1526 Butler Plank Road | Shaler | 1970 | |
| Shelly/Stella Street terracing | | 1930s | | Shelly and Stella Streets | South Side Slopes | 1998 | |
| Shields Presbyterian Church | | 1869 | Joseph W. Kerr? | Church Lane and Oliver Road | Edgeworth | 1975 | |
| Shinn-Beall house | | 1851 c. | | 168 Rockridge Road, Evergreen Hamlet | Ross Township | 1971 | |
| Peter Shouse house | | 1840 c. | | 451 Main Street | Crescent Township | 1987 | Demolished |
| Shrine of St. Anthony of Padua | | 1880, 1891 | | Harpster Street | Troy Hill | 1968 | |
| Siebert house | | 1892 | | 241 South Winebiddle Street | Bloomfield | 1982 | |
| John F. Singer house | | 1865 | Joseph W. Kerr? | 1318 Singer Place | Wilkinsburg | 2000 | |
| Sixteenth Street Bridge | | 1923 | H. G. Balcom, engineer; Warren & Wetmore, architects | Allegheny River at Mile 1.3; Sixteenth Street | Strip District and the Northside | 2001 | |
| Sixth, Seventh, and Ninth Street Bridges. (Roberto Clemente Bridge; Andy Warhol Bridge; Rachel Carson Bridge) | | 1926–28 | Allegheny County Department of Public Works, engineers | Sixth, Seventh, and Ninth Streets | Allegheny River, Downtown and North Shore | 1988 | |
| Smithfield Congregational (United) Church | | 1926 | Henry Hornbostel | 620 Smithfield Street | Downtown | 1976 | |
| Smithfield Street Bridge | | 1883 | Gustav Lindenthal | Smithfield Street over the Monongahela River | Downtown, South Side | 1970 | |
| William Penn Snyder House | | 1911 | George Orth & Brothers | Ridge and Galveston Avenues | Allegheny West | 1972 | |
| Snyder-Bockstoce house (Bockstoce-Fulton house) | | 1835–50 | | Shady Drive East near Alfred Street | Mount Lebanon | 1974, 1976 | Demolished |
| Soldiers' and Sailors' Memorial Hall | | 1911 | Henry Hornbostel | Fifth Avenue and Bigelow Boulevard | Oakland | 1970 | |
| South Craig Street District | | 19th century (late) and 20th century (mid) | | including 207–213, between Henry Street and Forbes Avenue | Oakland | 1976 | |
| South Hills Retirement Residence (South Hills High School) | | 1924 | Howard K. Jones, Alden & Harlow | 125 Ruth St. | Mount Washington | 2014 | |
| South Park Golf Club House | | 1938 | Henry Hornbostel | Brownsville Road | South Park Township | 2003 | |
| South Side Market House | | 1891, 1915 | | South Twelfth and Bingham Streets | South Side | 1968 | |
| South Vo-Tech High School (South Side High School) | | 1897, 1923 | Edward Stotz | East Carson and South Tenth Streets | South Side | 1992 | |
| Southminster Presbyterian Church (Mt. Lebanon Presbyterian Church) | | 1927–28 | Thomas Pringle | 799 Washington Road | Mt. Lebanon | 2007 | |
| Tillie S. Speyer house | | 1963 | A. James Speyer | 1500 Wightman St. | Squirrel Hill | 2014 | |
| "Spring Garden Farm" | | 1812–1817, c.1865; with additions | | 442 Dorseyville Road | Fox Chapel | 2016 | |
| Abraam Steinberg house | | 1951 | Peter Berndtson and Cornelia Brierly | 5139 Penton Road | Squirrel Hill | 1989, 1995 | |
| Sterrett Classical Academy (formerly Sterrett School) (City of Pittsburgh Public Schools) | | 1898 | Edward J. Carlisle | 339 Lang Avenue | Point Breeze | 2001 | |
| Stevens Elementary School (formerly Thaddeus Stevens School) (City of Pittsburgh Public Schools) | | 1940 | Marion M. Steen | 824 Crucible Street | Elliott | 2001 | |
| Louis S. Stevens house | | 1925 | Louis S. Stevens, designer | 4344 Brownsville Road | Brentwood | 1993 | |
| Stevenson Building | | 1896 | W. Ross Proctor | South Highland Avenue and Centre Avenue | East Liberty | 1977 | |
| Stewart Avenue Lutheran Church | | 1927 | O. M. Topp | 2810 Brownsville Road | Carrick | 2001 | |
| W. J. Stewart/Howard Stewart house | | 1873 | | 124 Hastings Avenue | Oakdale | 2007 | |
| Stewart-Schlag house | | 1834 | | Sangree Road | Ross Township | 1971 | Demolished |
| Strawberry Way | | 1890 c. | | Strawberry Way | Downtown | 2004 | |
| "Sunnyledge" (McClelland house) | | 1886 | Longfellow & Harlow | Fifth and Wilkins Avenues | Squirrel Hill | 1974 | |
| Swan Acres Historic District | | 1936 | Quentin S. Beck for Beck, Pople & Beck | Swan Drive | Ross Township | 2007 | |
| E. H. Swindell Bridge (East Street Bridge or Essen Street Bridge) | | 1930 | | Charles and Essen Streets | Perry South, Northview Heights | 2003 | |
| Tarentum Historic District | | 1886–1920 | | Fifth Avenue | Tarentum | 2009 | |
| Temple Sinai (Worthington house) | | 1910, 1915 | Louis S. Stevens | 5505 Forbes Avenue | Squirrel Hill | 1976 | |
| Teutonia Maennerchor | | 1888 | George Ott | 857 Phineas Street | East Allegheny | 2004 | |
| Thaw Hall, University of Pittsburgh (School of Engineering) | | 1909 | Henry Hornbostel | 4015 O'Hara Street | Oakland | 2003 | |
| Third Presbyterian Church | | 1903 | Theophilus Parsons Chandler Jr. | Fifth and Negley Avenues | Shadyside | 1973 | |
| Frank Thornburg house | | 1907 c. | Samuel T. McClarren | 1132 Lehigh Road | Thornburg | 1993 | |
| "Titlenure" | | 1770 c. | | 3215 Kennebec Road | Bethel Park | 1983 | |
| Torrence house | | 1790s, 1883 | | 121 Colson Drive | Pleasant Hills | 1983 | |
| Olin Trapp house | | 1963 | Peter Berndtson | 1551 Old Beulah Road | Penn Hills | 1989 | |
| Trinity Episcopal Cathedral | | 1872 | Gordon W. Lloyd | 322 Sixth Avenue | Downtown | 1970 | |
| Trinity German Evangelical Lutheran Church | | 1868 | | 2500 Brandt School Road | Franklin Park | 1971, 1983 | |
| Triumph the Church and Kingdom of God in Christ (St. Mary's Episcopal Church) | | 1901 | Charles M. Bartberger | 618 Lillie Avenue | Braddock | 2009 | |
| Troy Hill Fire Station #39 | | 1901 | Joseph Stillburg | Corner of Ley and Froman Streets | Troy Hill | 2001 | |
| Troy Hill Incline site | | 1887 | | Lowrie to East Ohio Street, 1700 blocks | Troy Hill | 1987 | |
| Union Trust Building | | 1917 | Frederick John Osterling | Fifth Avenue and Grant Street | Downtown | 1968 | |
| United Steelworkers Building (Five Gateway Center, IBM Building) | | 1963 | Curtis and Davis | 60 Boulevard of the Allies | Downtown | 2014 | |
| Urban Room, William Penn Hotel | | 1929 | Joseph Urban, designer | Grant Street and Sixth Avenue | Downtown | 1979 | |
| U.S. Post Office | | 1912 | James Knox Taylor | 140 East Ninth Avenue | Homestead | 1988 | |
| Veronica's Veil Auditorium (South Side Catholic High School: West Building or St. Michael's Maedchen Schule) | | 1900 | | 44 Pius Street | South Side Slopes | 2003 | Interior destroyed |
| Victoria Hall (Ursuline Academy, now the Waldorf School) | | 1868 and after | | 201 S. Winebiddle Street | Bloomfield | 1984 | |
| Victory Baptist Church | | 1865 | | 1437 Juniata Street | Manchester | 1976 | |
| Joseph Vokral house | | 1936 | Quentin S. Beck | 1919 Woodside Road | Shaler Township | 2012 | |
| Walker house | | 1844 | | 1026 Third Avenue | Elizabeth | 2001 | |
| Walker-Ewing Log House | | 1790 c. | | Noblestown Road east of Pinkerton Run Road | Collier Township | 1970 | |
| Walker-Way house | | 1810; 1820; 1841 | | 203 Beaver Road | Edgeworth | 1995 | |
| Andy Warhol Museum (Volkwein's, Frick & Lindsay Building) | | 1913 c. | Joseph Franklin Kuntz, of W. G. Wilkins Co. | Sandusky and General Robinson Streets | North Shore | 2000 | |
| Washington Polytechnic Academy (Washington School) | | 1908; 1920?; 1937 | Charles W. Bier, 1908; unknown; Marion M. Steen, 1937 | 169 Fortieth Street | Lawrenceville | 2002 | |
| Waverly Presbyterian Church | | 1930 | Ingham & Boyd | 590 South Braddock Avenue | Point Breeze | 2012 | |
| Abishai (or Nicholas) Way House | | 1838 | | Beaver Road | Edgeworth | 2002 | |
| Weil Technology Institute (Weil School) | | 1942 | Marion M. Steen | Centre Avenue and Soho Street | Hill, the | 2002 | |
| Edward Weinberger house | | 1948 | Peter Berndtson and Cornelia Brierly | 6380 Caton Street | Squirrel Hill | 1989 | |
| Welch Hall | | 1918 | Henry Hornbostel | Between Forbes Avenue and Frew Street, Carnegie Mellon University | Squirrel Hill | 2000 | |
| West End Bridge | | 1930–32 | | Ohio River at Mile 1 | West End and North Side | 2001 | |
| West End Park | | 1908 | Neil McCallum, planner | | West End | 1979 | |
| West End United Methodist Church | | 1887 | Longfellow, Alden & Harlow | 621 Main Street | Elliott | 1976 | |
| West Hall, Community College of Allegheny County (Memorial Hall, Western Theological Seminary) | | 1912 | Thomas Hannah | 826 Ridge Avenue | Allegheny West | 1990 | |
| Western Pennsylvania Hospital | | 1909 and after | John L. Beatty | 4800 Friendship Avenue | Bloomfield | 1973 | |
| Western Pennsylvania School for the Deaf | | 1892 (after), 1903 (administrative building) | Alden & Harlow, architects for administrative building, 1903 | Swissvale Avenue and Walnut Street | Edgewood | 1998 | |
| Westinghouse Air-Brake Company Administrative Building | | 1890, 1896, 1927 | Frederick J. Osterling and Janssen & Cocken | Herman Drive and Commerce Street | Wilmerding | 1975 | |
| Westinghouse Atom Smasher | | 1937 | | Avenue A and West Street | Forest Hills | 2000 | |
| Westinghouse High School (City of Pittsburgh Public Schools) | | 1917 | Ingham & Boyd | 1101 North Murtland Street | Homewood | 2001 | |
| Westinghouse Memorial Bridge | | 1932 | Allegheny County Department of Public Works, engineers | U.S. Route 30 over Turtle Creek | East Pittsburgh | 1984 | |
| The Whitehall | | 1906 | Frederick G. Scheibler Jr. | 201 East End Avenue | Park Place | 1983 | |
| Whittier School | | 1939 | Marion M. Steen | 150 Meridan Street | Mount Washington | 2016 | |
| William Penn Hotel (Omni William Penn Hotel) | | 1916, 1928 | Janssen & Abbot; Janssen & Cocken | Grant Street and Sixth Avenue | Downtown | 1972 | |
| Wilner house | | 1843 c. | | 203 Crider Lane | McCandless Township | 1971 | Demolished |
| Wilpen Hall | | 1897–1900 | George S. Orth & Brothers | Blackburn Road 40°32′51.97″N 80°9′5.99″W | Sewickley Heights | 2001 | |
| Jacob Witzel house | | 1820 | | 3392 Evergreen Road | Ross Township | 1981 | |
| Woman's Club of Mt. Lebanon | | 1940 | Ingham & Boyd | 750 Hollycrest Drive | Mt. Lebanon | 2009 | |
| Woodland Hills Academy (Turtle Creek High School; East Junior High School) | | 1917–1919 | George H. Schwan | 126 Monroeville Avenue | Turtle Creek | 2009 | |
| Woodland Road District | | 1860 (begun c.) | | | Squirrel Hill | 1982 | |
| Woolslair Elementary Gifted Center (formerly Woolslair Elementary School) (City of Pittsburgh Public Schools) | | 1897, 1925 | Samuel T. McClaren | 40th Street and Liberty Avenue | Lawrenceville | 2001 | |
| Wyckoff-Mason House | | 1775 c. | | 6133 Verona Road | Penn Hills | 1970 | |

== See also ==
- List of City of Pittsburgh historic designations
- National Register of Historic Places listings in Pittsburgh, Pennsylvania
- National Register of Historic Places listings in Allegheny County, Pennsylvania
- List of Pennsylvania state historical markers in Allegheny County
