= Beltzhoover =

Beltzhoover may refer to:

== People ==
- Frank E. Beltzhoover (1841–1923), American politician
- Jacob Beltzhoover (1770–1835), American pioneer
- Melchior S. Beltzhoover (1868–1918), American businessman

== Places ==
- Beltzhoover (Pittsburgh), a neighborhood of Pittsburgh, Pennsylvania, United States
  - Beltzhoover Elementary School
