= Wyckoff-Mason House =

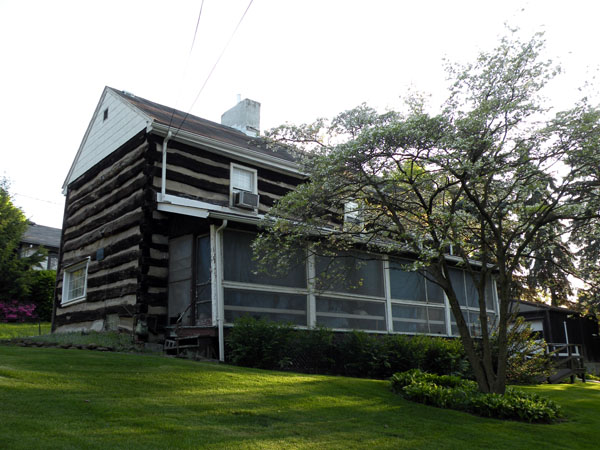

- Location of the Wyckoff-Mason House in Allegheny County, Pennsylvania
- 40°29′29.41″N 79°50′11.21″W
- Location: 6133 Verona Road in Penn Hills Township, Allegheny County, Pennsylvania, USA

History
- Built: 1774 and 1775

Site notes
- Architect: Isaac Wyckoff

Pittsburgh Landmark – PHLF
- Designated: 1970

Wyckoff-Mason House is a log house located at 6133 Verona Road in Penn Hills Township, Allegheny County, Pennsylvania, USA. It was built in 1774 and 1775 by Isaac Wyckoff. The house was added to the List of Pittsburgh History and Landmarks Foundation Historic Landmarks in 1970.
