= Knoxville Junior High School =

- U.S. National Register of Historic Places
- Pittsburgh Landmark – PHLF
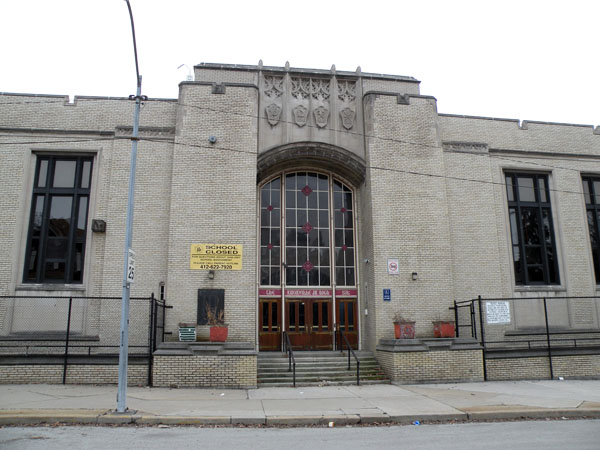

- Location within Pittsburgh Location within Pennsylvania Location within the United States
- Location: Charles and Grimes Aves., Pittsburgh, Pennsylvania
- Coordinates: 40°24′58″N 79°59′39″W
- Area: 2 acres (0.81 ha)
- Built: 1927
- Architects: Press C. Dowler, Marion M. Steen
- Architectural style: Art Deco, Tudor Revival
- MPS: Pittsburgh Public Schools TR
- NRHP reference No.: 86002673

Significant dates
- Added to NRHP: February 3, 1987
- Designated PHLF: 2002

The Knoxville Junior High School in the Knoxville neighborhood of Pittsburgh, Pennsylvania is a building from 1927. It was listed on the National Register of Historic Places in 1987. The school closed in 2006.
