= Nicholas Way House =

Historic house in Pennsylvania, United States

- U.S. National Register of Historic Places
- Pittsburgh Landmark – PHLF
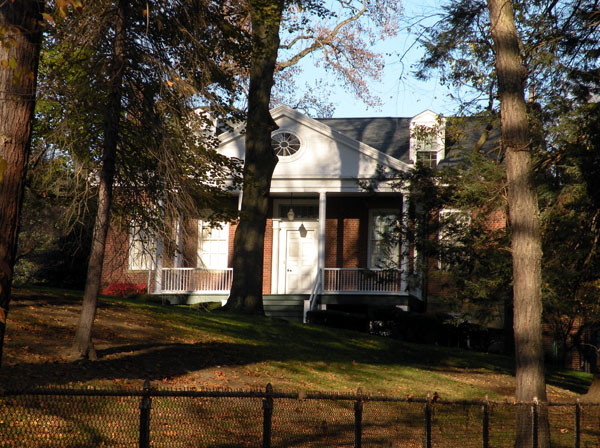

- Location within Pennsylvania Location within the United States
- Location: 108 Beaver Road; Edgeworth, Pennsylvania, USA
- Coordinates: 40°32′51.07″N 80°11′18.64″W
- Built: 1838
- Architectural style: Greek Revival
- NRHP reference No.: 78002339

Significant dates
- Added to NRHP: September 13, 1978
- Designated PHLF: 2002

The Nicholas Way House (also known as Abishai Way House) at 108 Beaver Road in Edgeworth, Pennsylvania, was built in 1838. This Greek Revival house was added to the National Register of Historic Places on September 13, 1978, and the List of Pittsburgh History and Landmarks Foundation Historic Landmarks in 2002.
