= St. Colman's Catholic School =

Historical landmark in Pennsylvania, United States

Coordinates: 40°24′22″N 79°49′40″W

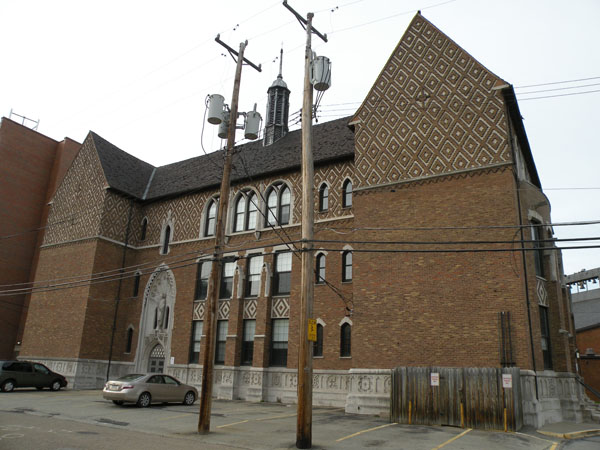
St. Colman's School located at Hunter Street and Stewart Avenue in Turtle Creek, Pennsylvania

St. Colman's Catholic School is a historic landmark located in Turtle Creek, Allegheny County, Pennsylvania.

== History ==
Originally established in 1888, St. Colman's School began operations in its Turtle Creek, Pennsylvania building after its 1928 construction next to the St. Colman Church (built in 1882). Designed by architects Link, Weber & Bowers, distinctive features include sandstone images carved on the building's exterior and a sculpture of St. Colman situated above the building's ornamented Hunter Street entrance.

After the original church burned down in 1976 and a new church building was constructed on a different spot on the property, and dedicated there on May 14, 1978, an addition was also made to the school. Designed in a more modern style than the school's original architecture, this new addition included a cafeteria with classrooms that formed the Junior High portion of the school. The class of 2006, which had just 18 students, was the last to graduate.

The school is on the list of historic landmarks recognized by the Pittsburgh History and Landmarks Foundation (PHLF).
