= 899 Old Thorn Run Road =

Historic site in Pennsylvania, United States

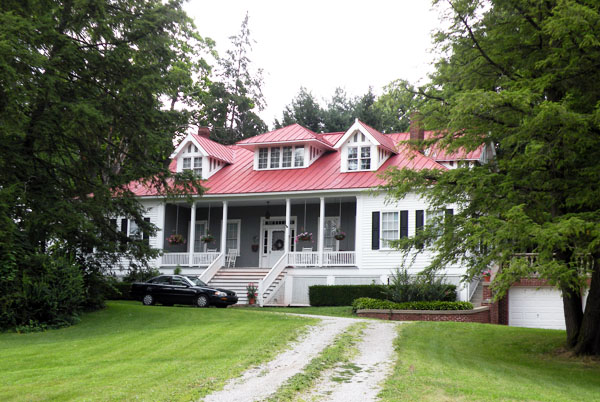

- Location of 899 Old Thorn Run Road in Allegheny County, Pennsylvania
- 40°31′1.83″N 80°11′48.76″W
- Location: 899 Old Thorn Run Road, Moon Township, Pennsylvania, USA

History
- Built: 1814

Pittsburgh Landmark – PHLF
- Designated: 1988

899 Old Thorn Run Road in Moon Township, Pennsylvania, was built in 1814. The house was added to the List of Pittsburgh History and Landmarks Foundation Historic Landmarks in 1988.
