= Grand Carousel =

Carousel at Kennywood

Coordinates: 40.3477°N 75.0326°W

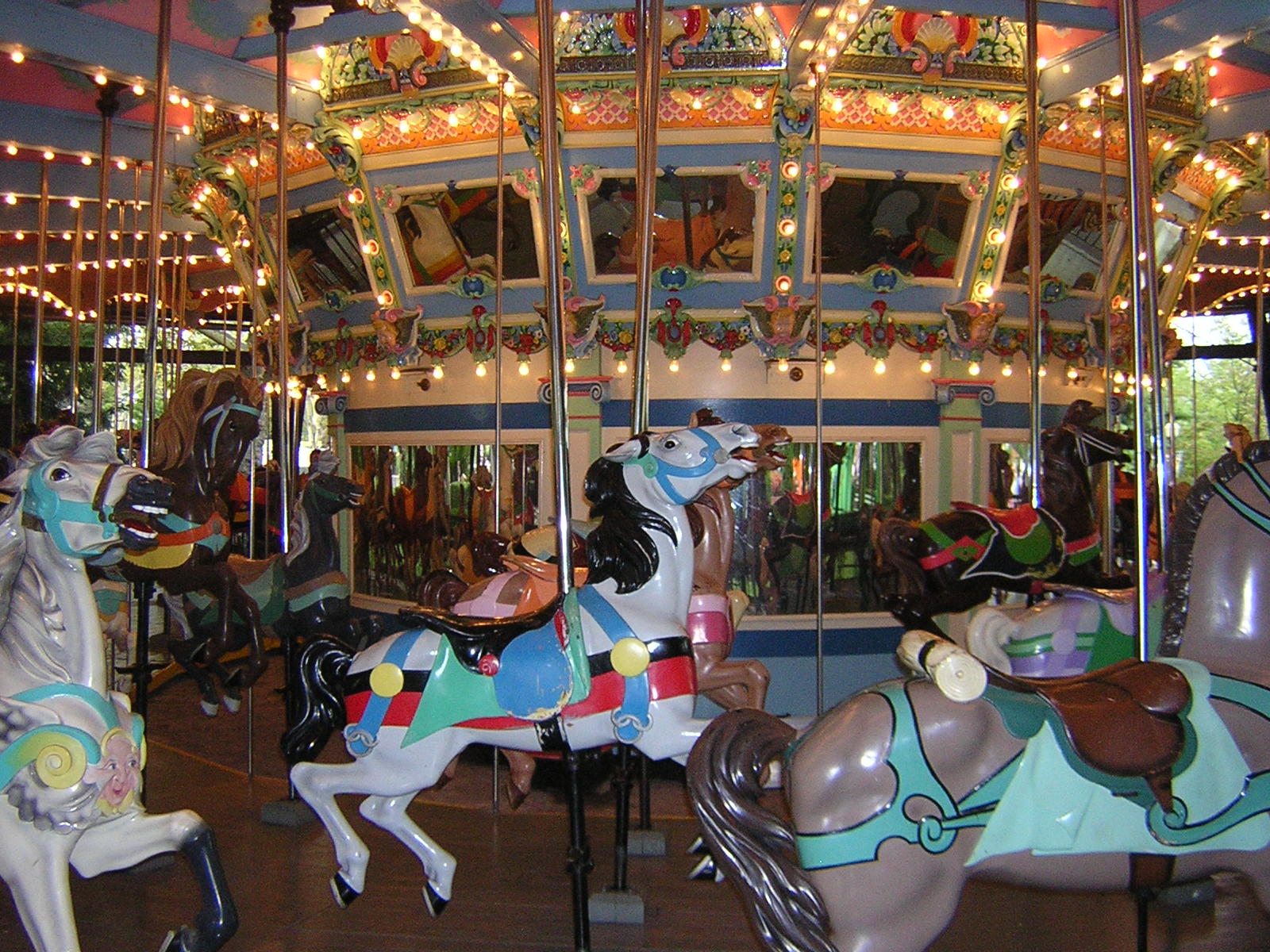
Grand Carousel

Grand Carousel, also known as Merry-Go-Round, was built for the 1926 Philadelphia sesquicentennial by William H. Dentzel. Finished too late for the sesquicentennial, it was instead installed at Kennywood amusement park in West Mifflin, Pennsylvania in 1927. A Pittsburgh History and Landmarks Foundation Historic Landmark, Grand Carousel is Kennywood's largest carousel, and the third carousel to operate at the park.

== History and notable features ==
The music on the carousel is provided by a 1916 Wurlitzer Military Band Organ. It is a four-abreast carousel, meaning that it has four rows of animals, and it travels in a counter-clockwise direction. Over 1,500 lights decorate the ride.

The two notable non-equine animals featured on the ride are a tiger and a lion. These two non-equine animals qualify this carousel as a menagerie carousel. It is one of the three rides at Kennywood with a start/stop bell that dates back to the origin of the ride.

== Restoration ==
Both the carousel and band organ were restored following the 1975 season. The carousel was restored again after the 2004 season, and the band organ after the 2010 season.
