= Addy-Spencer House =

Historic building in Pennsylvania, US

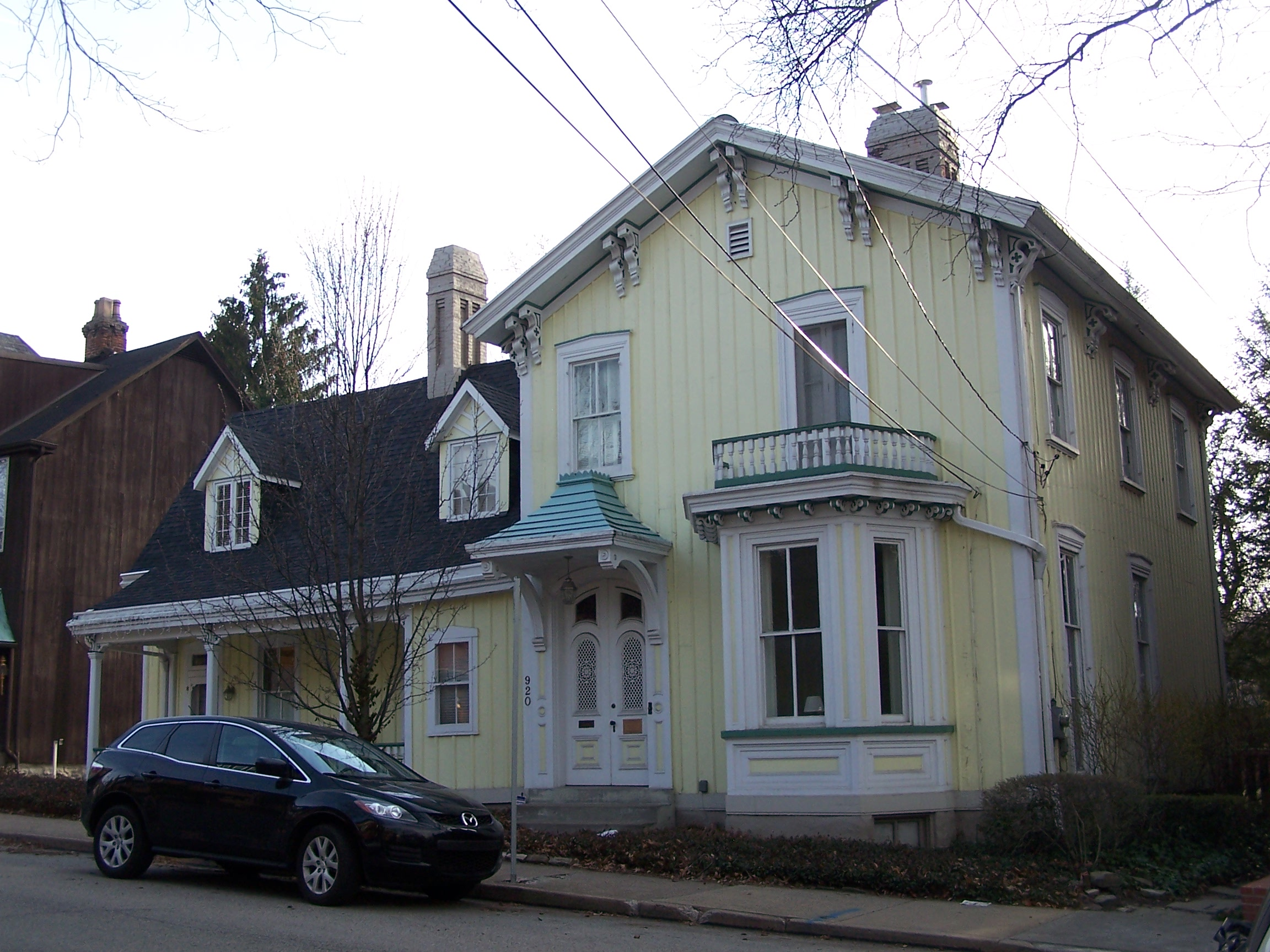

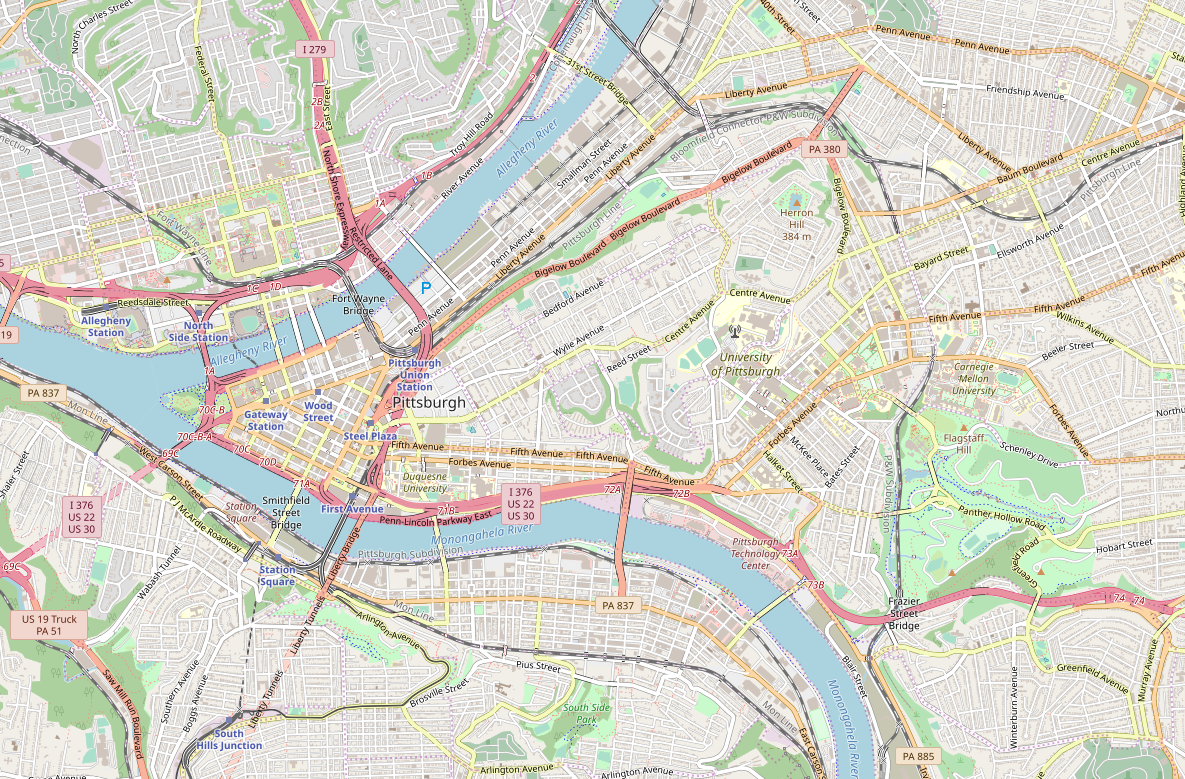
- Location of the Addy-Spencer House in Downtown Pittsburgh
- 40.44895°N 79.93597°W
- Location: 919-20 St. James Street (Shadyside), Pittsburgh, Pennsylvania, USA

History
- Built: 1869

Pittsburgh Landmark – PHLF
- Designated: 2000

Addy-Spencer House located at 919–20 St. James Street in the Shadyside neighborhood of Pittsburgh, Pennsylvania, was built in 1869. It was added to the List of Pittsburgh History and Landmarks Foundation Historic Landmarks in 2000.
