= Evergreen Hamlet =

Historic house in Pennsylvania, United States

- U.S. National Register of Historic Places
- U.S. Historic district
- Pittsburgh Landmark – PHLF
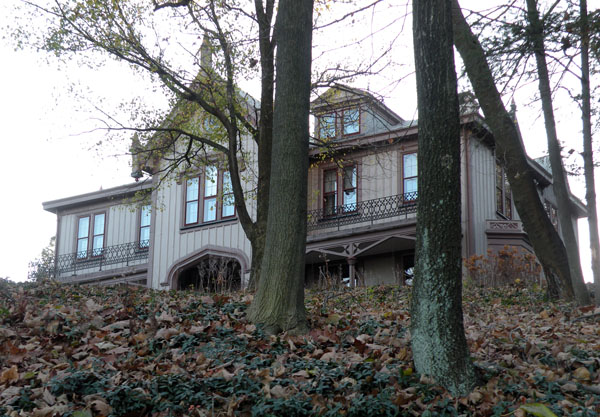
- The Hill-McCallam-Davies House, one of the four houses of Evergreen Hamlet, located on Evergreen Hamlet Road (Rock Ridge Road) in Ross Township, Allegheny County, Pennsylvania

- Location within Pennsylvania Location within the United States
- Coordinates: 40°30′29.41″N 79°59′39.23″W
- Built: 1852
- Architect: Joseph W. Kerr
- Architectural style: Gothic Revival, Other, Georgian
- NRHP reference No.: 74001738

Significant dates
- Added to NRHP: September 17, 1974
- Designated PHLF: 1971

Evergreen Hamlet is a historic district in Ross Township, Allegheny County, Pennsylvania, USA. It was a planned community that was founded by William Shinn in 1851. Joseph W. Kerr (1815–1888) designed all four of the Evergreen Hamlet houses. The community was listed on the National Register of Historic Places on September 17, 1974.
