= Boggs Avenue Elementary School =

Historic building in Pittsburgh, Pennsylvania

- U.S. National Register of Historic Places
- Pittsburgh Landmark – PHLF
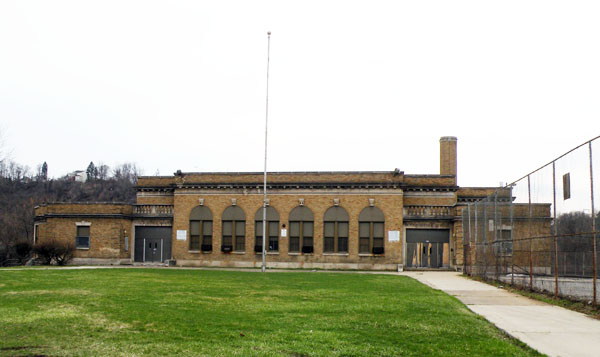

- Location within Pittsburgh Location within Pennsylvania Location within the United States
- Location: Boggs and Southern Aves., Pittsburgh, Pennsylvania
- Coordinates: 40°25′2″N 80°0′49″W
- Area: 1 acre (0.40 ha)
- Built: 1925
- Architect: Sydney F. Heckert
- Architectural style: Renaissance
- MPS: Pittsburgh Public Schools TR
- NRHP reference No.: 86002659

Significant dates
- Added to NRHP: February 3, 1987
- Designated PHLF: 2002

The Boggs Avenue Elementary School in the Mount Washington neighborhood of Pittsburgh, Pennsylvania is a building from 1925. It was listed on the National Register of Historic Places in 1987. The school closed in 1985.
