= Allegheny Social Hall =

Building of historic significance located in Pittsburgh, Pennsylvania, U.S.

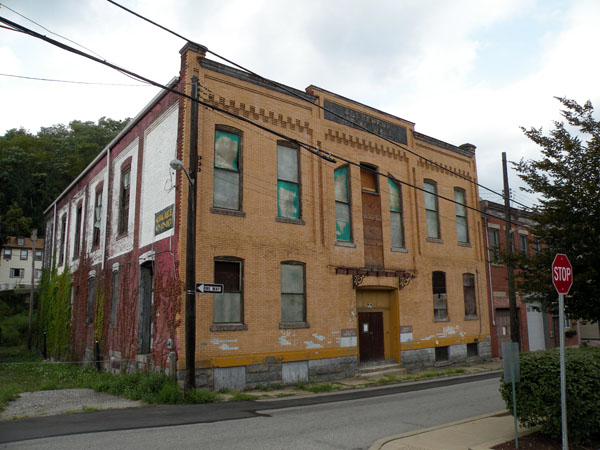

- Location of Allegheny Social Hall in Pittsburgh
- 40°27′28.33″N 79°59′50.7″W
- Location: 810-812 Concord Street (East Allegheny), Pittsburgh, Pennsylvania, United States

History
- Built: 1903

Pittsburgh Landmark – PHLF
- Designated: 2003

Allegheny Social Hall located at 810-812 Concord Street in the East Allegheny neighborhood of Pittsburgh, Pennsylvania, was built in 1903. It was built at a time when this area was part of the city of Allegheny, Pennsylvania. The building was added to the List of Pittsburgh History and Landmarks Foundation Historic Landmarks in 2003.
