= Allegheny Market House =

Allegheny Market House (former site)
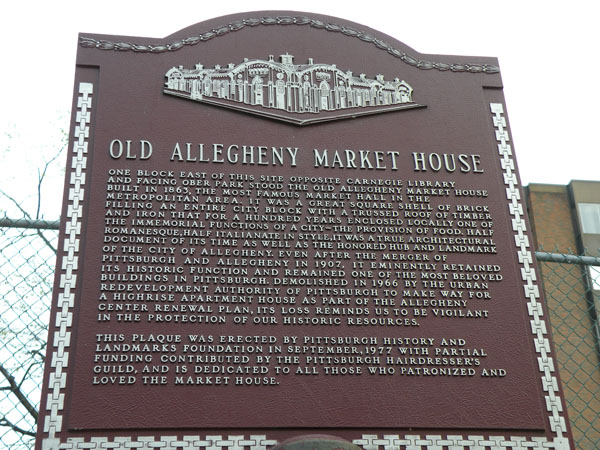

- Location of the former Allegheny Market House in Pittsburgh
- 40°27′8.44″N 80°0′18.03″W
- Location: Allegheny Center, Pittsburgh, Pennsylvania, USA

History
- Built: 1863

Pittsburgh Landmark – PHLF
- Designated: 1979

Allegheny Market House was located in the Allegheny Center neighborhood of Pittsburgh, Pennsylvania, and was built in 1863. It was built at a time when this area was part of the city of Allegheny, Pennsylvania. Even though the market house was demolished in 1966, the former site of the building was added to the List of Pittsburgh History and Landmarks Foundation Historic Landmarks in 1979.
