= Isaac Lightner House =

Historic house in Pennsylvania, United States

- U.S. National Register of Historic Places
- Pittsburgh Landmark – PHLF
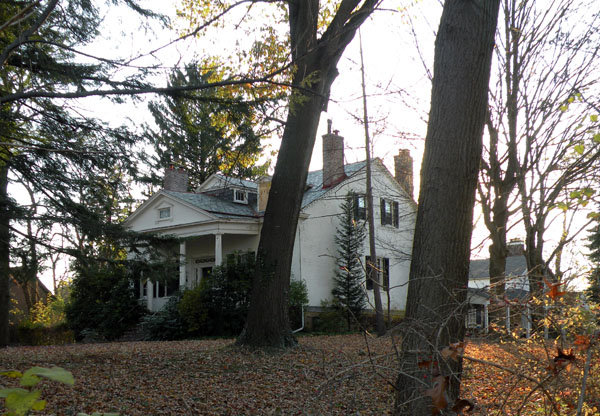

- Location within Pennsylvania Location within the United States
- Location: 2407 Mount Royal Boulevard, Shaler Township, Pennsylvania
- Coordinates: 40°32′15″N 79°58′21.65″W
- Built: 1833
- Architectural style: Greek Revival
- NRHP reference No.: 78002333

Significant dates
- Added to NRHP: April 20, 1978
- Designated PHLF: 1976

The Isaac Lightner House in Shaler Township, Pennsylvania, was built in 1833. This Greek Revival house was added to the National Register of Historic Places on April 20, 1978, and the List of Pittsburgh History and Landmarks Foundation Historic Landmarks in 1976.
