= United States Post Office-Sewickley Branch =

- U.S. National Register of Historic Places
- Pittsburgh Landmark – PHLF
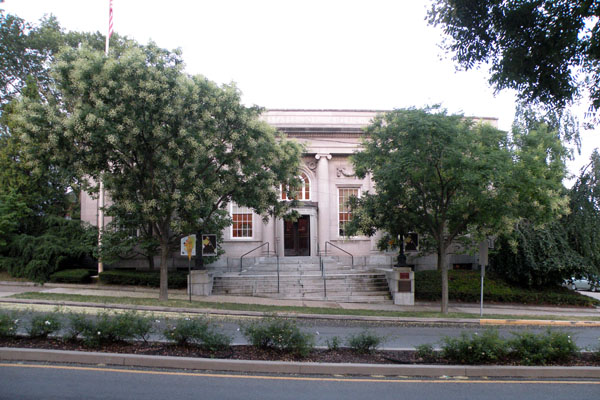

- Location within Pennsylvania Location within the United States
- Location: 200 Broad St. Sewickley, Pennsylvania, USA
- Coordinates: 40°32′12.73″N 80°11′2.26″W
- Built: 1910
- Architectural style: Classical Revival
- NRHP reference No.: 12001094

Significant dates
- Added to NRHP: December 26, 2012
- Designated PHLF: 2000

The United States Post Office-Sewickley Branch is an American post office building that is located at 200 Broad Street in Sewickley, Pennsylvania. It was built in 1910.

== History and architectural features ==
This historic building was designed by architect James Knox Taylor, who was the Supervising Architect of the United States Department of the Treasury from 1897 to 1912. It was created in the classical revival style and was added to the National Register of Historic Places on December 26, 2012, and the List of Pittsburgh History and Landmarks Foundation Historic Landmarks in 2000.
