= Letsche Elementary School =

- U.S. National Register of Historic Places
- Pittsburgh Landmark – PHLF
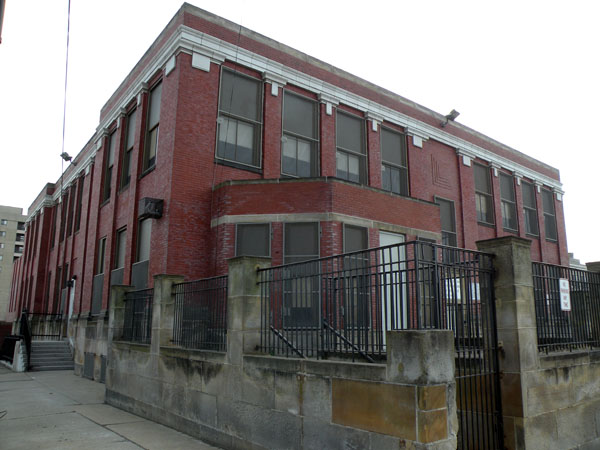

- Location within Pittsburgh Location within Pennsylvania Location within the United States
- Location: 1530 Cliff St., Pittsburgh, Pennsylvania
- Coordinates: 40°26′41″N 79°59′16″W
- Area: 1 acre (0.40 ha)
- Built: 1905
- Architect: Steen, Marion M.
- Architectural style: Classical Revival, Art Deco
- MPS: Pittsburgh Public Schools TR
- NRHP reference No.: 86002682

Significant dates
- Added to NRHP: September 30, 1986
- Designated PHLF: 2002

The Letsche Elementary School (also known as Letsche Alternative Learning Center and Letsche Education Center) located in the Crawford–Roberts neighborhood of in Pittsburgh, Pennsylvania is a building from 1905. It was listed on the National Register of Historic Places in 1986. The school closed and was converted into apartments that opened in 2025.
