= Burke Building =

- U.S. National Register of Historic Places
- Pittsburgh Landmark – PHLF
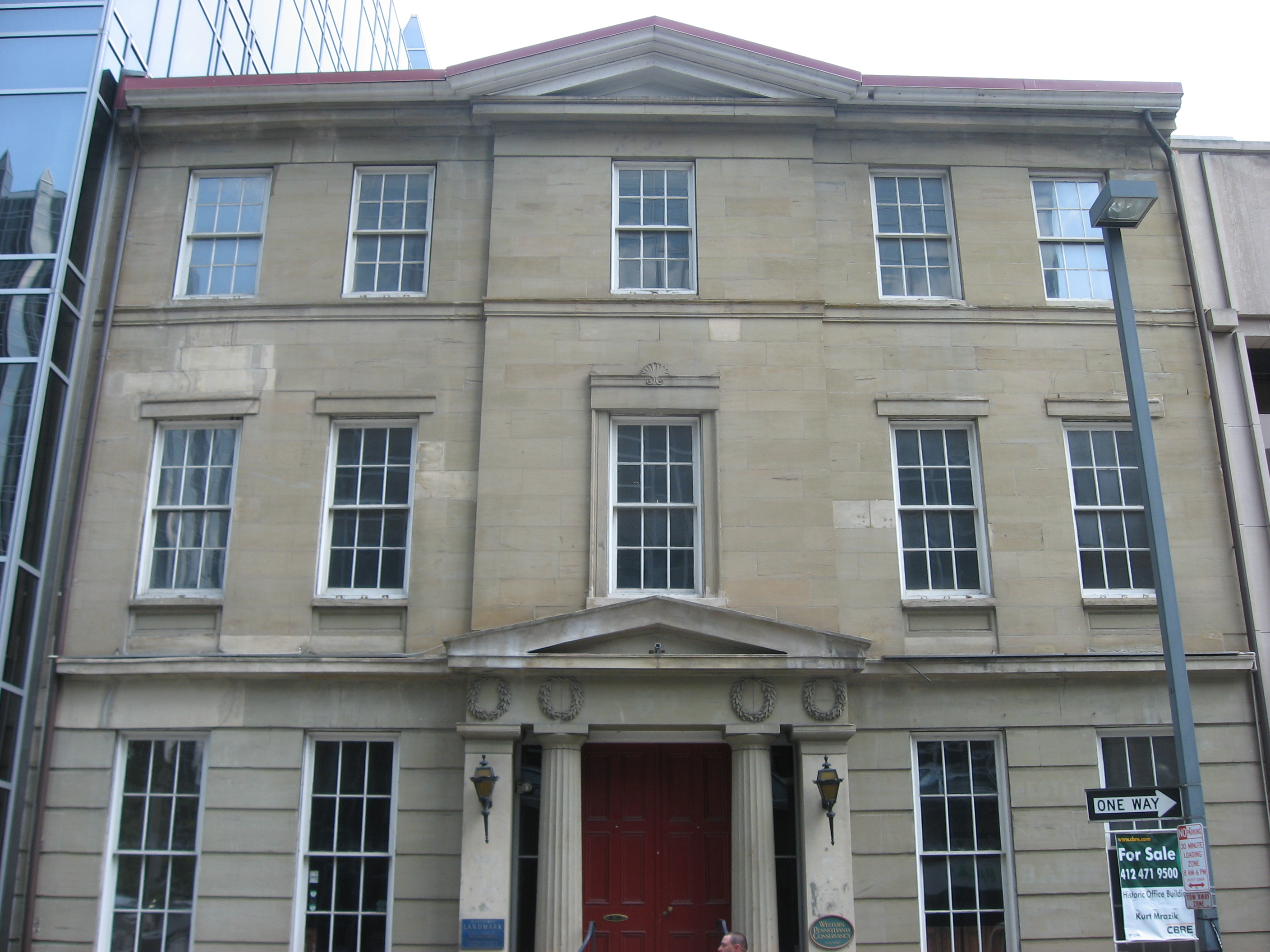

- Location within Pittsburgh Location within Pennsylvania Location within the United States
- Location: 209-211 4th Ave., Pittsburgh, Pennsylvania
- Coordinates: 40°26′24″N 80°0′9″W
- Area: 0.3 acres (0.12 ha)
- Built: 1836
- Architect: Chislett, John
- Architectural style: Greek Revival
- NRHP reference No.: 78002335

Significant dates
- Added to NRHP: September 18, 1978
- Designated PHLF: 1970

The Burke Building in downtown Pittsburgh, Pennsylvania is a building from 1836. It was Pittsburgh's first major office building and a major anchor of the city's financial district centered on Fourth Avenue. Since the 1845 Great Fire burned over a thousand buildings, it is the city's only remaining large Greek Revival building. It was listed on the National Register of Historic Places in 1978.
