= Corliss Tunnel =

Tunnel in Pittsburgh, Pennsylvania, US

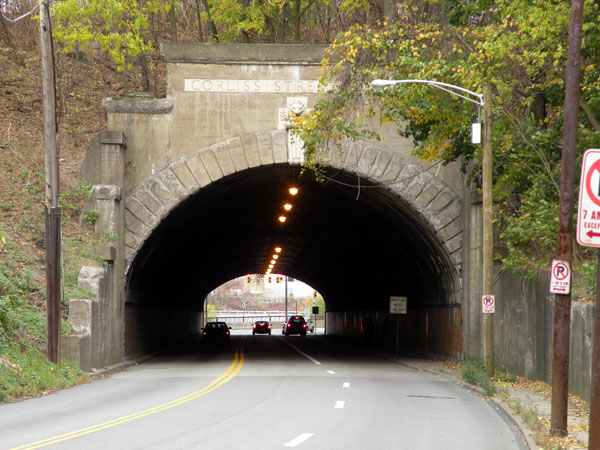

- Location of Corliss Tunnel in Allegheny County, Pennsylvania
- 40°27′7.54″N 80°2′26.82″W
- Location: Corliss Street south from West Carson Street (Elliott), Pittsburgh, Pennsylvania, USA

History
- Built: 1914

Site notes
- Architect: Stanley L. Roush

Pittsburgh Landmark – PHLF
- Designated: 2002

Corliss Tunnel, located at Corliss Street south from West Carson Street in the Elliott neighborhood of Pittsburgh, Pennsylvania, was built in 1914. It was added to the List of Pittsburgh History and Landmarks Foundation Historic Landmarks in 2002.
