= Fort Pitt Elementary School =

- U.S. National Register of Historic Places
- Pittsburgh Landmark – PHLF
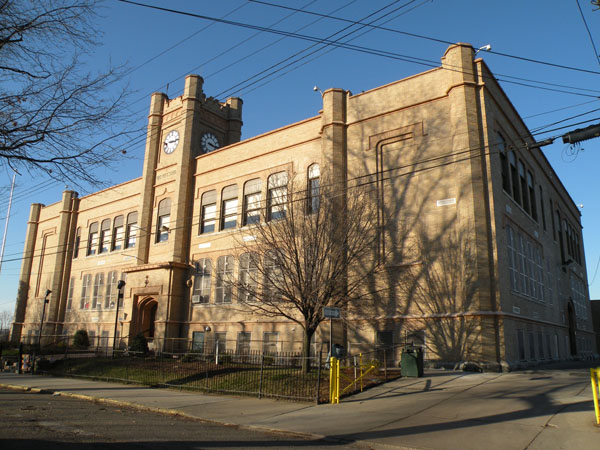

- Location within Pittsburgh Location within Pennsylvania Location within the United States
- Location: 5101 Hillcrest St., Pittsburgh, Pennsylvania
- Coordinates: 40°28′08″N 79°56′30″W
- Area: 2 acres (0.81 ha)
- Built: 1905
- Architect: Bartberger, Charles M.; Shenk, Henry, Co.
- Architectural style: Tudor Revival, Jacobean Revival
- MPS: Pittsburgh Public Schools TR
- NRHP reference No.: 86002666

Significant dates
- Added to NRHP: September 30, 1986
- Designated PHLF: 2002

The Fort Pitt Elementary School is a former elementary school and historic building located in Pittsburgh, Pennsylvania. It was built in 1905. It was listed on the National Register of Historic Places in 1986.
