= Prospect Junior High and Elementary School =

- U.S. National Register of Historic Places
- Pittsburgh Landmark – PHLF
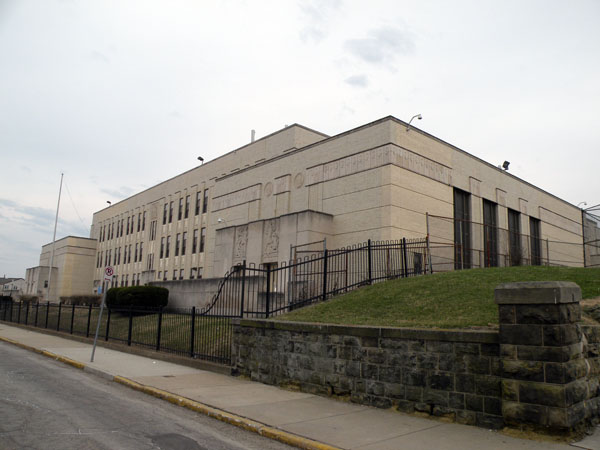

- Location within Pittsburgh Location within Pennsylvania Location within the United States
- Location: 200 Cowan St, Pittsburgh, Pennsylvania
- Coordinates: 40°25′40″N 80°0′37″W
- Area: 2 acres (0.81 ha)
- Built: 1931
- Architect: James T. Steen & Sons; Marion M. Steen
- Architectural style: Art Deco
- MPS: Pittsburgh Public Schools TR
- NRHP reference No.: 86002705

Significant dates
- Added to NRHP: September 30, 1986
- Designated PHLF: 2002

The Prospect Junior High and Elementary School in the Mount Washington neighborhood of Pittsburgh, Pennsylvania is a building from 1931. It was listed on the National Register of Historic Places in 1986. The school closed in 2006, and the building has since been converted into apartments.
