= Allegheny County Office Building =

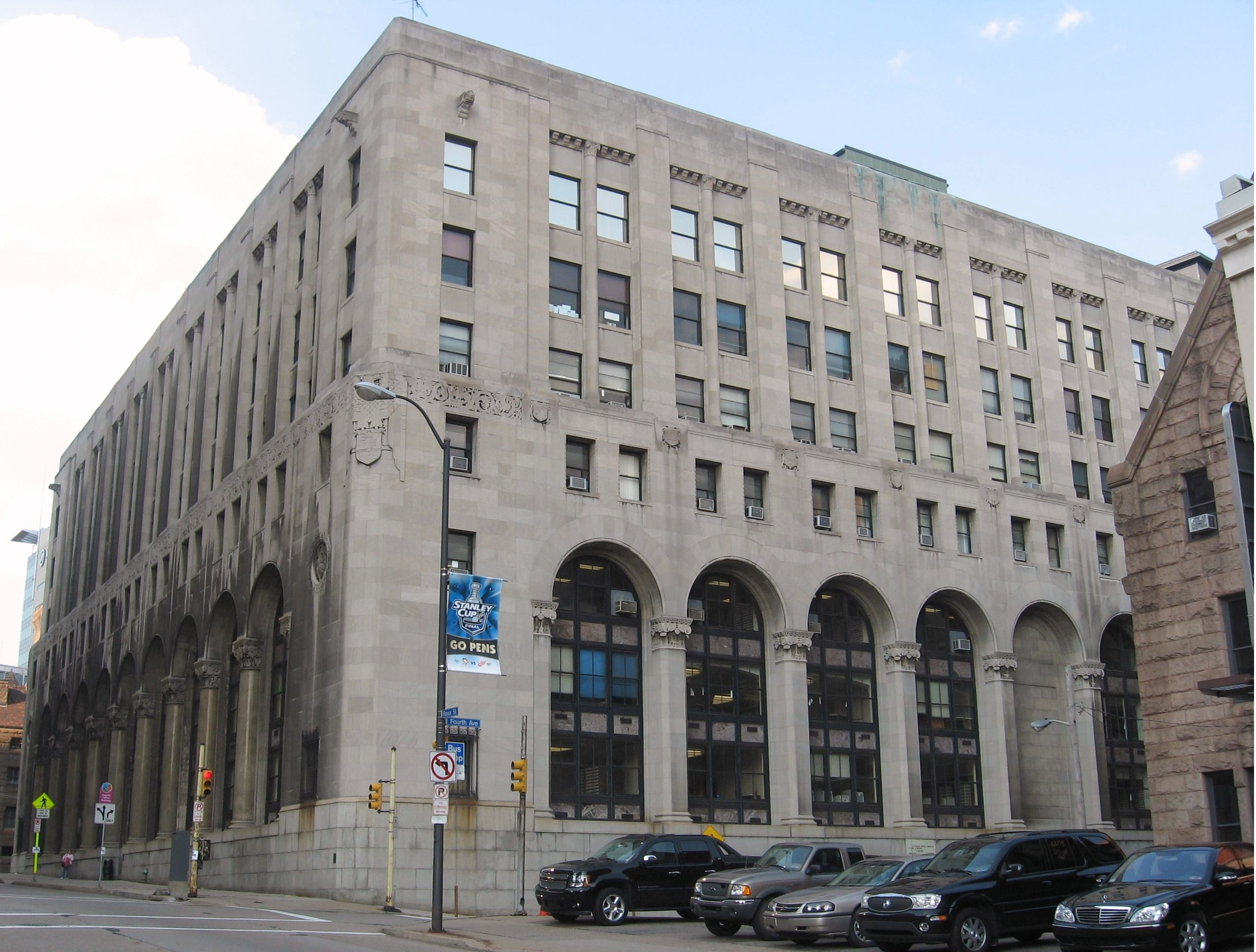

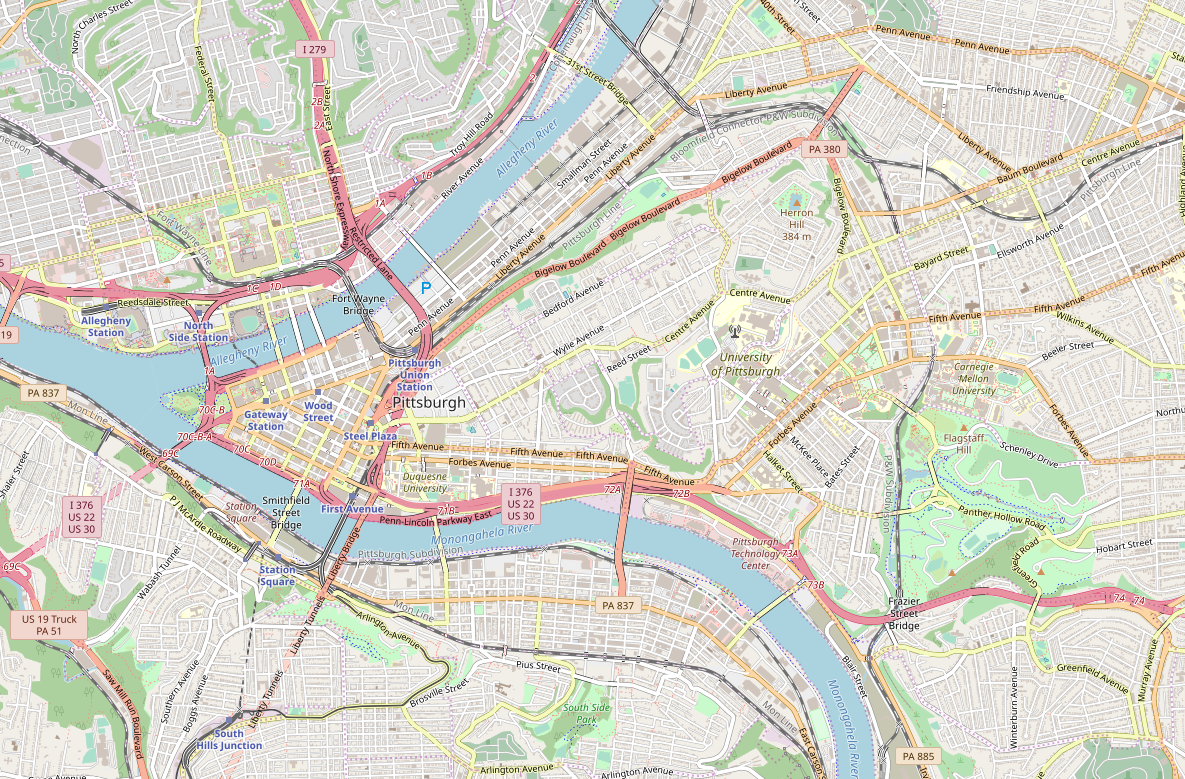
- Location of Allegheny County Office Building in Downtown Pittsburgh
- 40°26′16.28″N 79°59′44.58″W
- Location: 542 Forbes Avenue; Ross Street at Forbes Avenue (Downtown), Pittsburgh, Pennsylvania, USA

History
- Built: 1931

Site notes
- Architect: Stanley L. Roush

Pittsburgh Landmark – PHLF
- Designated: 2002

Allegheny County Office Building located at Ross Street and Forbes Avenue in downtown Pittsburgh, Pennsylvania, was built in two years, from 1929 to 1931. It was added to the List of Pittsburgh History and Landmarks Foundation Historic Landmarks in 2002.
