= First Methodist Episcopal Church of McKeesport =

Historic church in Pennsylvania, United States

- U.S. National Register of Historic Places
- Pittsburgh Landmark – PHLF
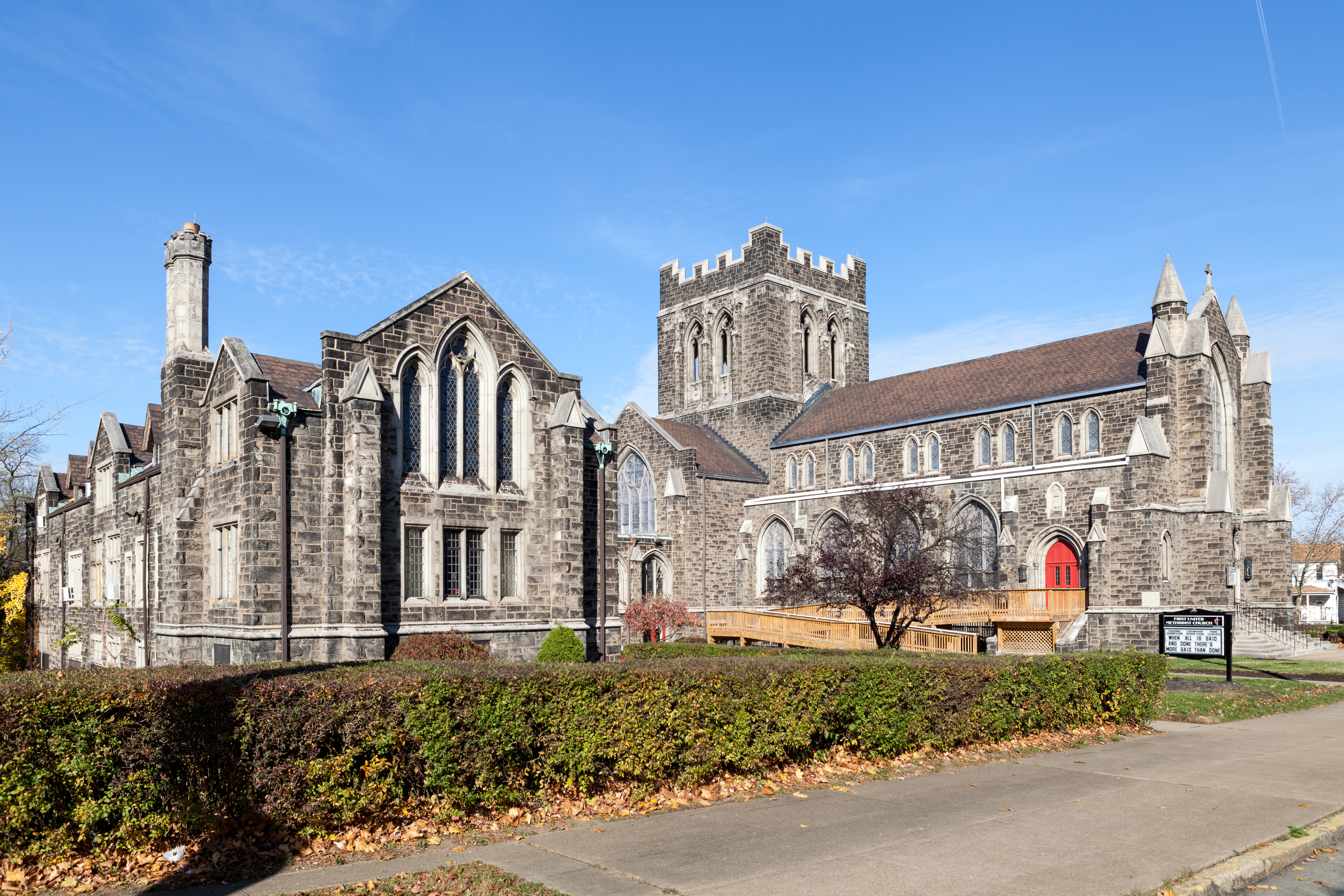
- The church in November 2014, now named First United Methodist Church

- Location within Pennsylvania Location within the United States
- Location: 1406 Cornell Street, McKeesport, Pennsylvania
- Coordinates: 40°20′47″N 79°51′30″W
- Area: 2 acres (0.81 ha)
- Built: 1926
- Built by: Edward Wehr
- Architect: Charles Webber Bolton
- Architectural style: Late Gothic Revival
- NRHP reference No.: 14000814

Significant dates
- Added to NRHP: September 30, 2014
- Designated PHLF: 2012

First Methodist Episcopal Church of McKeesport, known since 1968 as the First United Methodist Church, is a historic church in McKeesport, Allegheny County, Pennsylvania. The Late Gothic Revival style church has been in use for religious services and community events since its dedication. It was added to the National Register of Historic Places in 2014.

== History ==
The First Methodist Episcopal Church grew from circuit riding preachers in the Ohio valley area in 1787. Methodists met in a combined church built in 1819, with Presbyterians and Baptists, in the area that became Mckeesport. The First Methodist Episcopal Church congregation was incorporated in 1841. Growth had moved the congregation to a third church by 1876.

That church, at the corner of Walnut Street and Penny Avenue was destroyed by fire on July 11, 1924. Planning for a new building began soon after. Land was purchased along Fourteenth Avenue, now Cornell Street. Ground breaking was on Sunday, June 14, 1925, the completed church was dedicated on Sunday, November 21, 1926.

== Architecture ==
The church is built in three main sections, a Nave, a Chapel, and the Community building. The northern section, the Nave, with its north and south transepts form a cross when viewed from overhead. A bell tower is situated at the center of that cross.

The sandstone building is built on a steel-reinforced concrete foundation. No major changes have been made to the building since its construction.
