= Mifflin Elementary School =

- U.S. National Register of Historic Places
- City of Pittsburgh Historic Structure
- Pittsburgh Landmark – PHLF
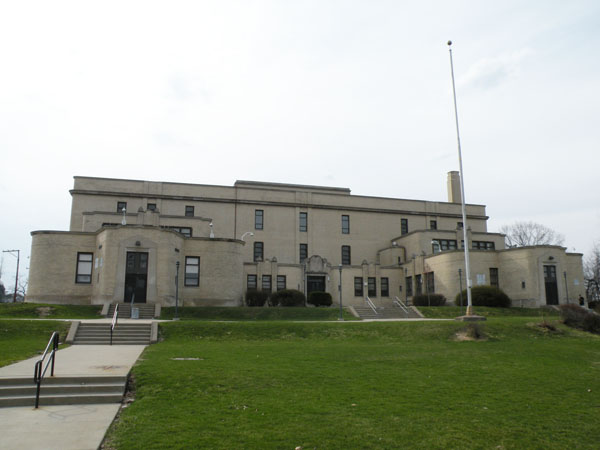

- Location within Pittsburgh Location within Pennsylvania Location within the United States
- Location: 1290 Mifflin Rd., Pittsburgh, Pennsylvania
- Coordinates: 40°22′12″N 79°54′53″W
- Area: 7 acres (2.8 ha)
- Built: 1932
- Architect: Link, Weber & Bowers
- Architectural style: Moderne
- Website: Mifflin Elementary School
- MPS: Pittsburgh Public Schools TR
- NRHP reference No.: 86002692

Significant dates
- Added to NRHP: September 30, 1986
- Designated CPHS: November 30, 1999
- Designated PHLF: 2001

The Mifflin Elementary School (also known as Pittsburgh Mifflin PreK-8) is a public elementary school located in the Lincoln Place neighborhood of Pittsburgh, Pennsylvania. And this school is active serving kindergarten to eighth grade. It was built in 1932. It was listed on the National Register of Historic Places in 1986.
