= Beltzhoover Elementary School =

- U.S. National Register of Historic Places
- City of Pittsburgh Historic Structure
- Pittsburgh Landmark – PHLF
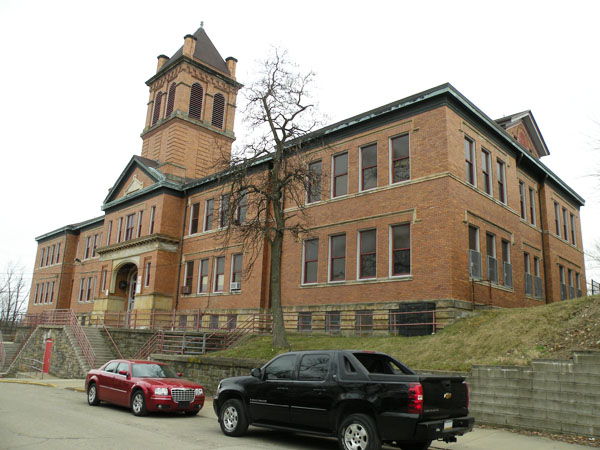

- Location within Pittsburgh Location within Pennsylvania Location within the United States
- Location: Cedarhurst and Estella Sts., Pittsburgh, Pennsylvania
- Coordinates: 40°25′5″N 80°0′7″W
- Area: 2 acres (0.81 ha)
- Built: 1909
- Architect: Shaw, William J.; Lloyd, Thomas
- Architectural style: Classical Revival
- MPS: Pittsburgh Public Schools TR
- NRHP reference No.: 86002657

Significant dates
- Added to NRHP: September 30, 1986
- Designated CPHS: November 30, 1999
- Designated PHLF: 2001

The Beltzhoover Elementary School in the Beltzhoover neighborhood of Pittsburgh, Pennsylvania, is a building from 1909. It was listed on the National Register of Historic Places in 1986. The school was one of ten schools closed in 2004 by Pittsburgh Public Schools.
