= Peter Berndtson =

American architect

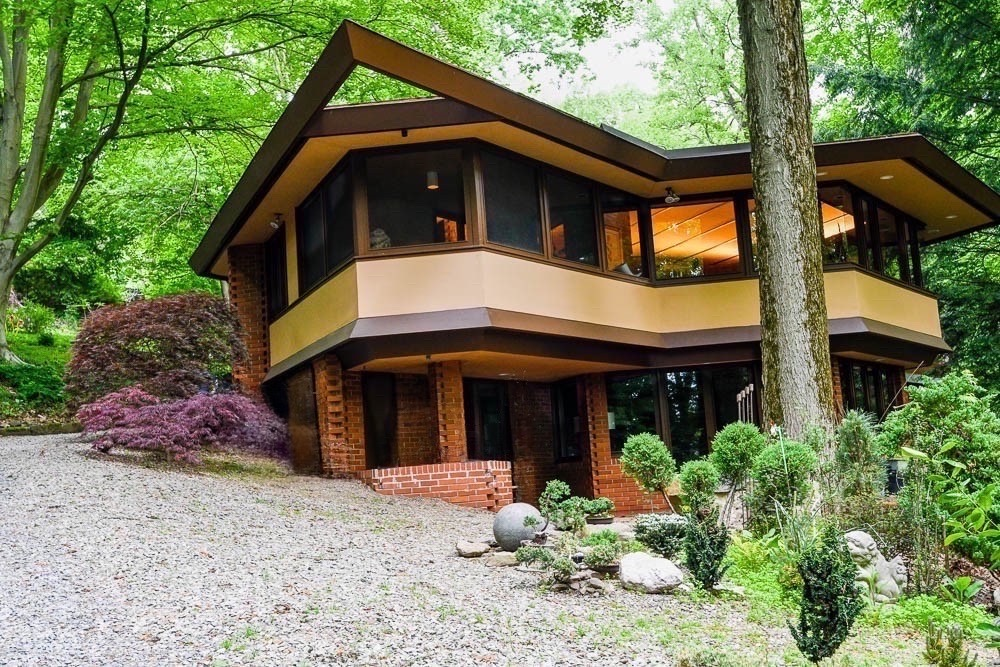
Harlan Douglas House (1962-1965) in Pittsburgh, PA - Peter Berndtson Architect

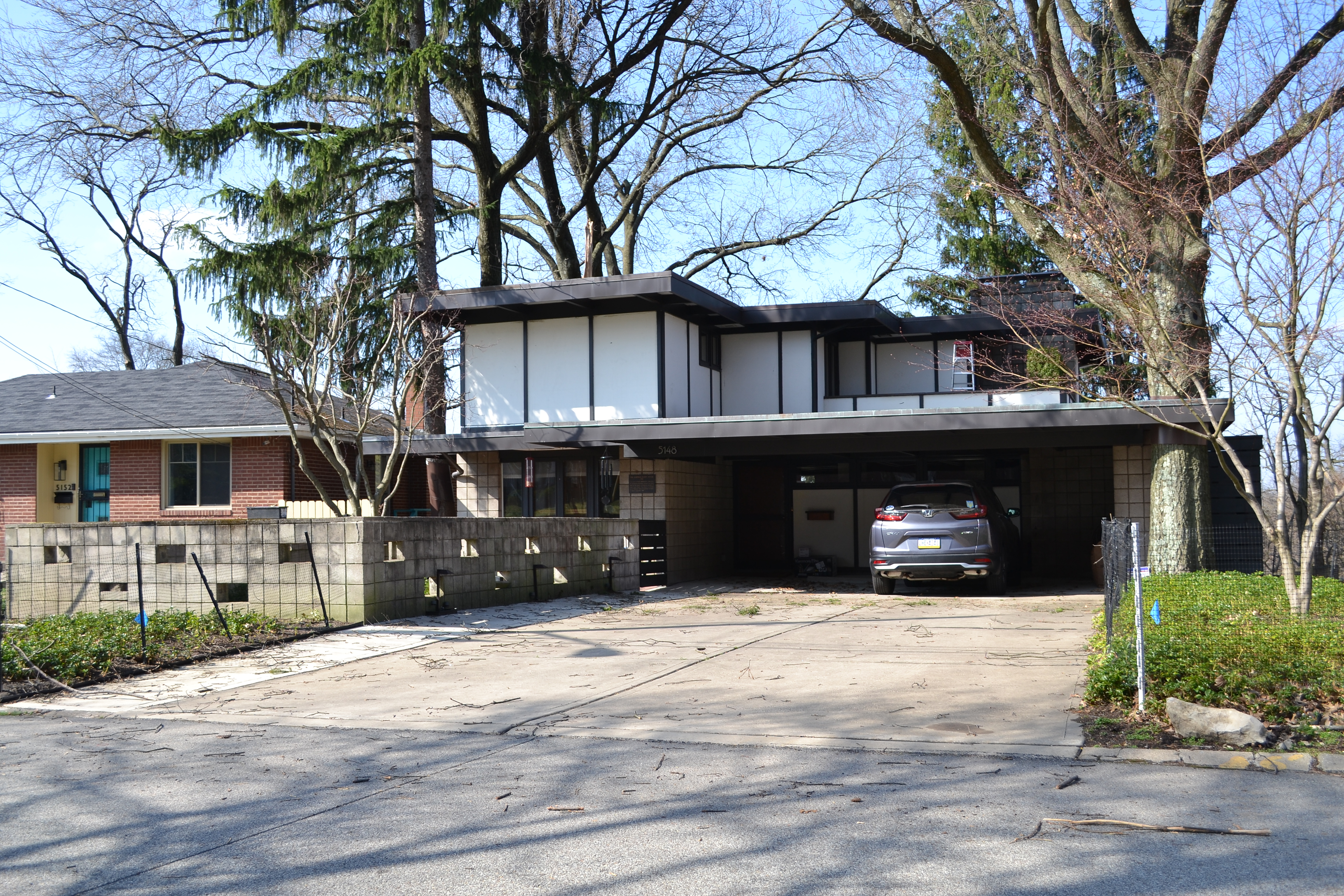
Garfield-Scott House (1964) by Peter Berndtson

Peter Berndtson (1909–1972) was an American architect.

== Biography ==
Born in Massachusetts, Berndtson studied at the Massachusetts Institute of Technology for two years, but dropped out after his father died.

In 1938, he began studies at Frank Lloyd Wright's (1867-1959) Taliesin Fellowship, where he worked on projects that included the Guggenheim Museum. Here, he also met and soon married another student, Cornelia Brierly, who had also studied at Carnegie Tech in Pittsburgh, Pennsylvania. The couple settled in Western Pennsylvania and together applied Wrightian theories to home design.

In 1946, Berndtson became a registered Pennsylvania architect.

Berndtson's best known work is Polymath Park, which is located sixty miles southwest of Pittsburgh in the Laurel Highlands and sited near Wright's Fallingwater and Kentuck Knob. The park features two Berndtson houses as well as Wright's Duncan House. Though he designed more than eighty houses throughout his career, only thirty were actually ever completed.

== Death ==
Berndtson died on December 27, 1972.

== Legacy ==
Just East of Pittsburgh, in west Mifflin, there is a small group of privately owned, Berndtson-designed homes.

Carnegie Mellon University's Hunt Library houses the Peter Berndtson Collection, which includes documents on nearly one hundred Berndtson architectural projects.
