= International Harvester Branch House (Pittsburgh) =

- International Harvester Company of America: Pittsburgh Branch House
- U.S. National Register of Historic Places
- U.S. Historic district – Contributing property
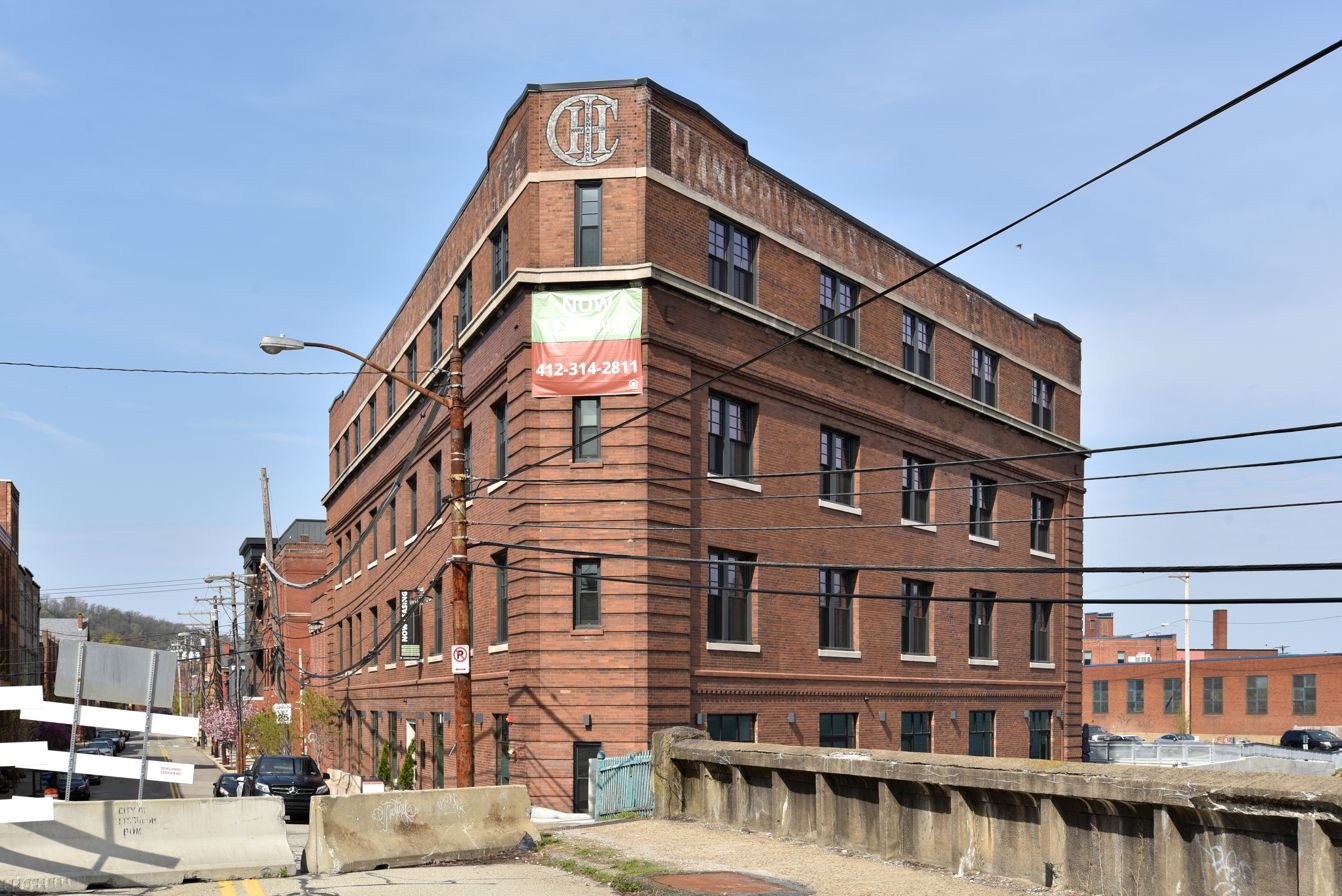
- The building in 2025

- Location within Pittsburgh Location within Pennsylvania Location within the United States
- Location: 810 West North Avenue, Pittsburgh, Pennsylvania 15233
- Coordinates: 40°27′15″N 80°0′56″W
- Area: Central Northside
- Built: 1902
- Architectural style: Classical Revival
- Restored: 2024
- Restored by: Q Development, Mistick Construction, & PWWG Architects
- Website: branchhouselofts.com
- Part of: Allegheny Second Ward Industrial Historic District (ID100011908)
- NRHP reference No.: 100006371

Significant dates
- Added to NRHP: April 12, 2021
- Designated CP: June 12, 2025

The Pittsburgh Branch House of the International Harvester Company, now known as the Allegheny Branch House Lofts, is a historic building in the Central Northside neighborhood of Pittsburgh, Pennsylvania. It was built in 1901–02 by the McCormick Harvesting Machine Company, which merged into International Harvester before the building was completed. It was enlarged with a fourth story in 1912–13. The Branch House housed the company's local showrooms, offices, and service department until 1959. The building was used by a printing supply company from 1962 to 2020 and was subsequently repurposed as a residential building. It was listed on the National Register of Historic Places in 2021 and was also listed as a contributing property in the Allegheny Second Ward Industrial Historic District in 2025.

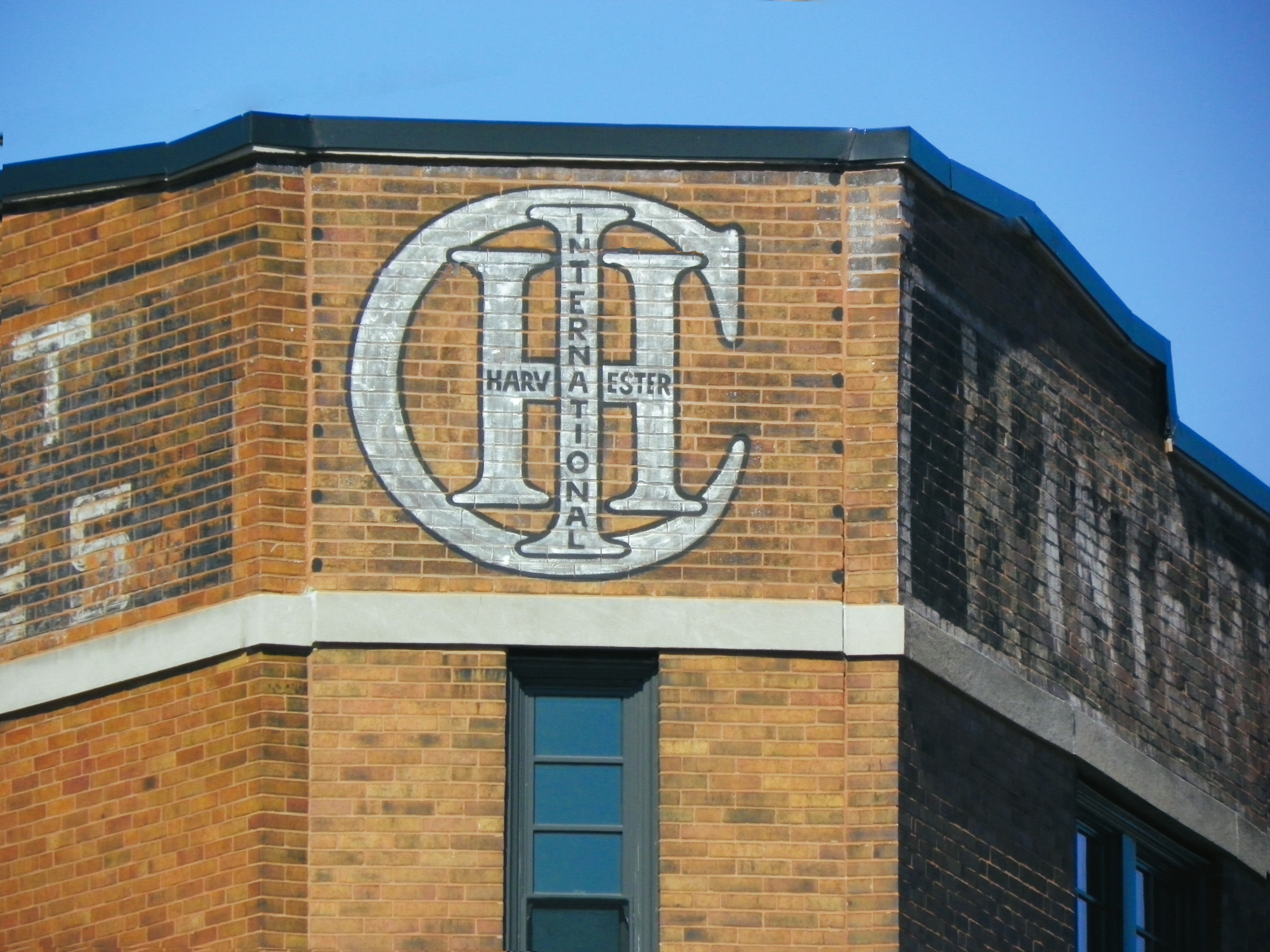
Detail from building

The Branch House is a four-story brick building with a "flatiron" plan defined by the acute angle of North Avenue and the Norfolk Southern Railway line. The front elevation is nine bays wide; the westernmost three bays and fourth story were part of the 1913 addition. A former railroad siding along the rear loading dock allowed loading and unloading of equipment. In 2024, the Q Development company restored the building and rebranded it as Allegheny Branch House Lofts. The complex now contains 36 apartments.

== See also ==
- National Register of Historic Places listings in Pittsburgh, Pennsylvania
