= Allegheny Second Ward Industrial Historic District =

Historic district in Pennsylvania, United States

- U.S. National Register of Historic Places
- U.S. Historic district
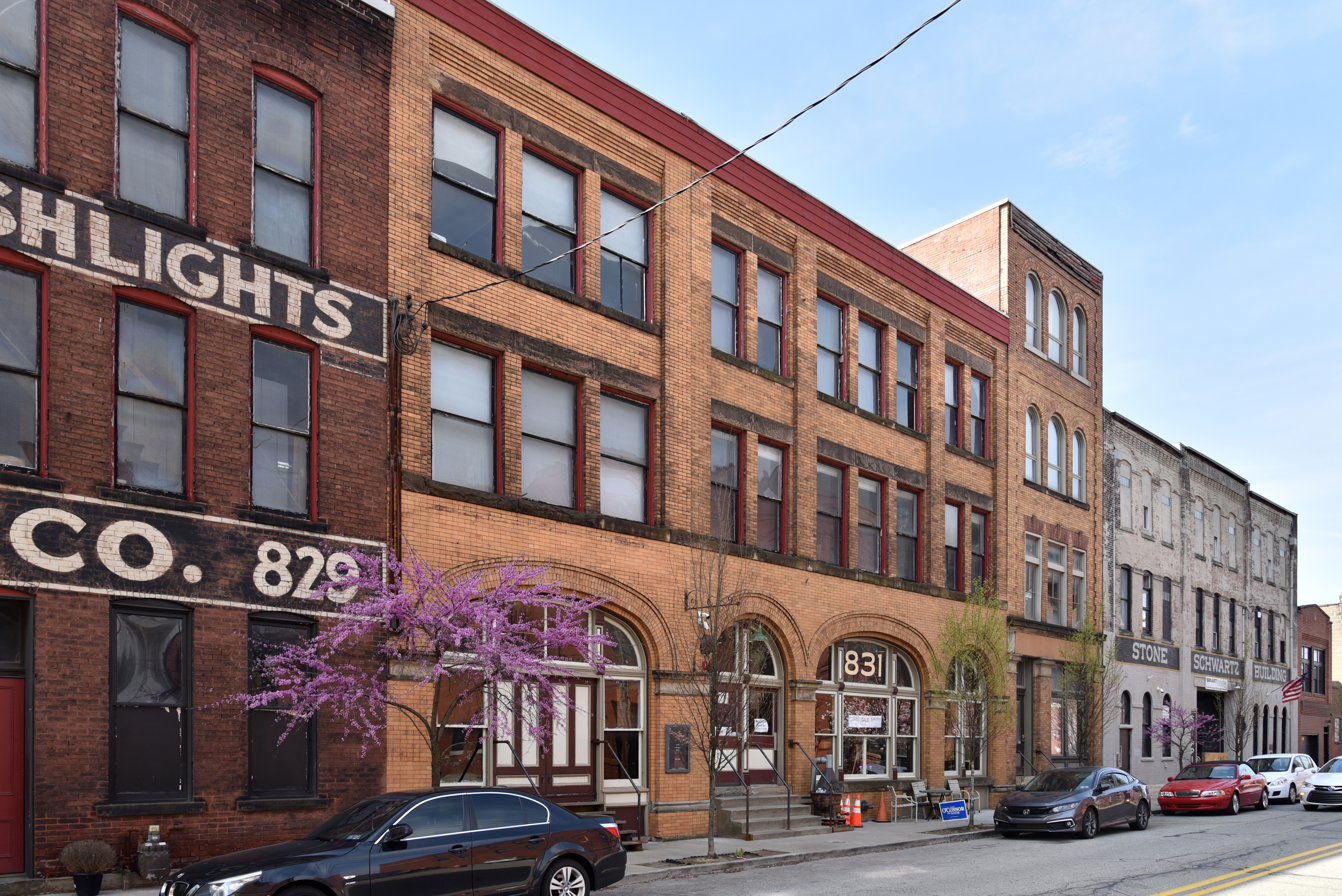
- Buildings on West North Avenue, 2025

- Location within Pittsburgh
- Location: Bounded roughly by Pennsylvania Avenue, Brighton Road/Drovers Way, W North Avenue/Buttercup Way, and Allegheny Avenue; Pittsburgh, Pennsylvania, USA
- Coordinates: 40°27′15″N 80°1′2″W
- NRHP reference No.: 100011908
- Added to NRHP: June 12, 2025

The Allegheny Second Ward Industrial Historic District is a historic district in Pittsburgh, Pennsylvania, which was listed on the National Register of Historic Places in 2025. It is located on the city's North Side (formerly the city of Allegheny), primarily within the Central Northside neighborhood but with small portions extending into the adjoining neighborhoods of Allegheny West, Manchester, and California-Kirkbride. The district comprises mainly industrial properties built in proximity to the Pennsylvania Railroad Fort Wayne Line between the late 19th and early 20th centuries.

Contributing properties in the district include the International Harvester Branch House, which is individually listed on the National Register of Historic Places; the Allegheny City Stables, a City of Pittsburgh Historic Site; and the Katsafanas Coffee Company Building and Allegheny City Electric Light Plant, which are recognized as PHLF Historic Landmarks by the Pittsburgh History and Landmarks Foundation.
