= Malta Temple =

Building in Pittsburgh, United States

- Malta Temple (Salvation Army Building)
- U.S. Historic district – Contributing property
- Pittsburgh Historic Designation
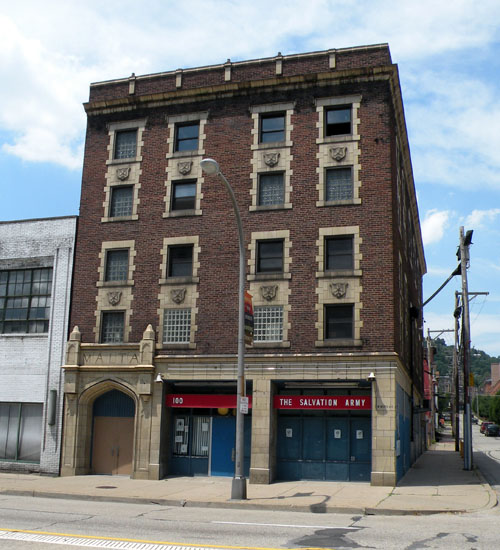
- Malta Temple in 2010

- Location within Pittsburgh Location within Pennsylvania Location within the United States
- Location: 100 West North Avenue (Central Northside), Pittsburgh, Pennsylvania, USA
- Coordinates: 40°27′19.41″N 80°0′28.07″W
- Built: 1927
- Part of: Mexican War Streets Historic District (ID08000845)

Significant dates
- Designated CP: September 4, 2008
- Designated PHD: August 5, 2008

The Malta Temple (also known as the Salvation Army Building) is located at 100 West North Avenue in the Central Northside neighborhood of Pittsburgh, Pennsylvania.

It was added to the List of City of Pittsburgh historic designations on August 5, 2008.

== History and architectural features ==
Built in 1927, this historic building was once the home of a fraternal order known as the Order of Malta. It then became a Salvation Army building. In a five to two decision, the Pittsburgh Planning Commission voted to save this building from demolition in 2008.

The building was added to the List of City of Pittsburgh historic designations on August 5, 2008.
