= Thomas H. Scott =

American architect (1865–1940)

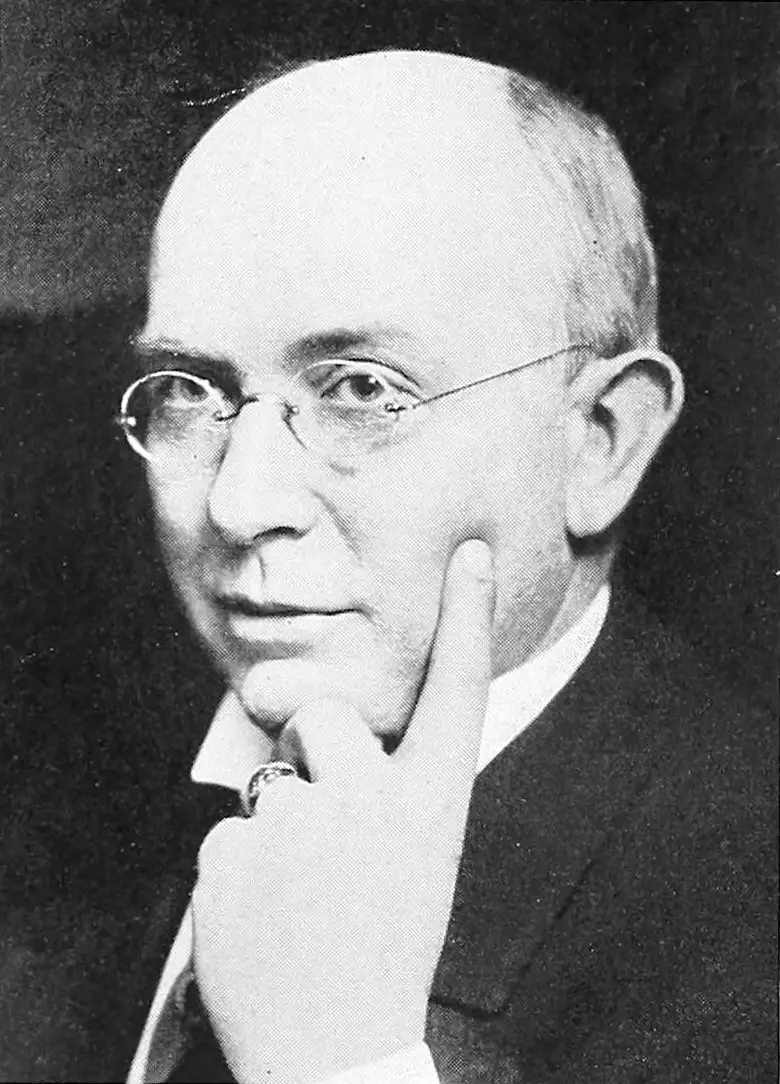
Photograph of Scott published in 1913

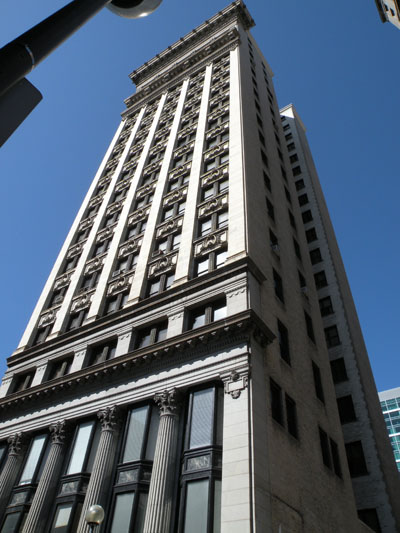
Benedum-Trees Building

Thomas Hagerty Scott (September 7, 1865 – July 15, 1940) was an architect in Pittsburgh, Pennsylvania. He is credited with designing the Benedum-Trees Building (1905) in downtown Pittsburgh at 221 Fourth Avenue. It was added to the List of Pittsburgh History and Landmarks Foundation Historic Landmarks in 1973. The Garden Theater (1915) in Pittsburgh's Central Northside neighborhood, also designed by Scott, was placed on the List of City of Pittsburgh historic designations by Pittsburgh City Council on March 25, 2008.

Scott was born September 7, 1865, the son of John H. and Ann Scott. He attended public schools in Washington County, Pennsylvania. He worked with the firm of Scott and Peebles in 1889 and took over the firm in 1890. His credited designs include those for the Machesney Building (1905) (later known as the Benedum-Trees building), Wilkinsburg High School (1910), the Garden Theater (1915), the Standard Steel Car Company's offices, the McCance Building, and he was also the architect for the Denny estate. He died of a stroke at his home on July 15, 1940.

== Works ==
- Machesney Building (1905) (later known as the Benedum-Trees building) The office building includes granite, brick and terra cotta with classical three-story Corinthian columns and an interior lobby ornamented with marble, bronze, and plaster.
- Wilkinsburg High School (1910) at 747 Wallace Avenue in Wilkinsburg, Pennsylvania
- Garden Theater (1915) at 12 West North Avenue in the Central Northside neighborhood of Pittsburgh, Pennsylvania
- Standard Steel Car Company's offices
- McCance Building
- Bandstand in West End Park, Pittsburgh
- Denny estate architecture
