= Brown Chapel =

Brown Chapel and variations may refer to:

- Browns Chapel, West Virginia, an unincorporated community in Monongalia County
- Brown Chapel A.M.E. Church (Selma, Alabama)
- Brown Chapel A.M.E. Church (Pittsburgh, Pennsylvania)

== See also ==
- List of African Methodist Episcopal churches
