= Engine Company No. 3 (Pittsburgh) =

Historic building in Pennsylvania, United States

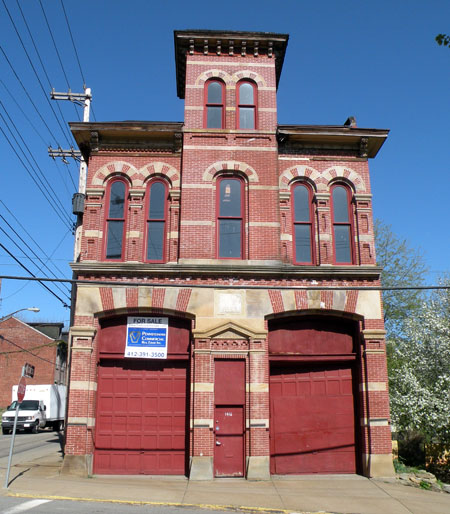

- Location within Pittsburgh
- 40°27′28.26″N 80°0′33.68″W
- Location: 1416 Arch Street (Central Northside), Pittsburgh, Pennsylvania, USA

History
- Built: 1877

Engine Company No. 3 located at 1416 Arch Street in the Central Northside neighborhood of Pittsburgh, Pennsylvania, was built in 1877. It was added to the List of City of Pittsburgh historic designations on April 12, 1995.
