= Ferris House (Pittsburgh) =

Building in Pittsburgh, Pennsylvania, United States

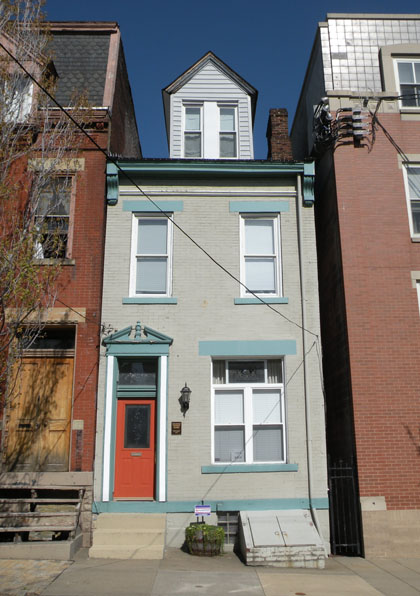
- Ferris House
- Interactive map of Ferris House
- 40.457058°N 80.009097°W
- Location: 1318 Arch Street, Pittsburgh, Pennsylvania

Ferris House is an historic building in Pittsburgh, Pennsylvania, located at 1318 Arch Street in the Central Northside neighborhood of Pittsburgh. It was once the home of George Washington Gale Ferris Jr., who designed and constructed the original Ferris Wheel for the World's Columbian Exposition of 1893. The street address was 204 Arch Street at the time of his residency.
