= Allegheny City Stables =

- U.S. Historic district – Contributing property
- Pittsburgh Historic Designation
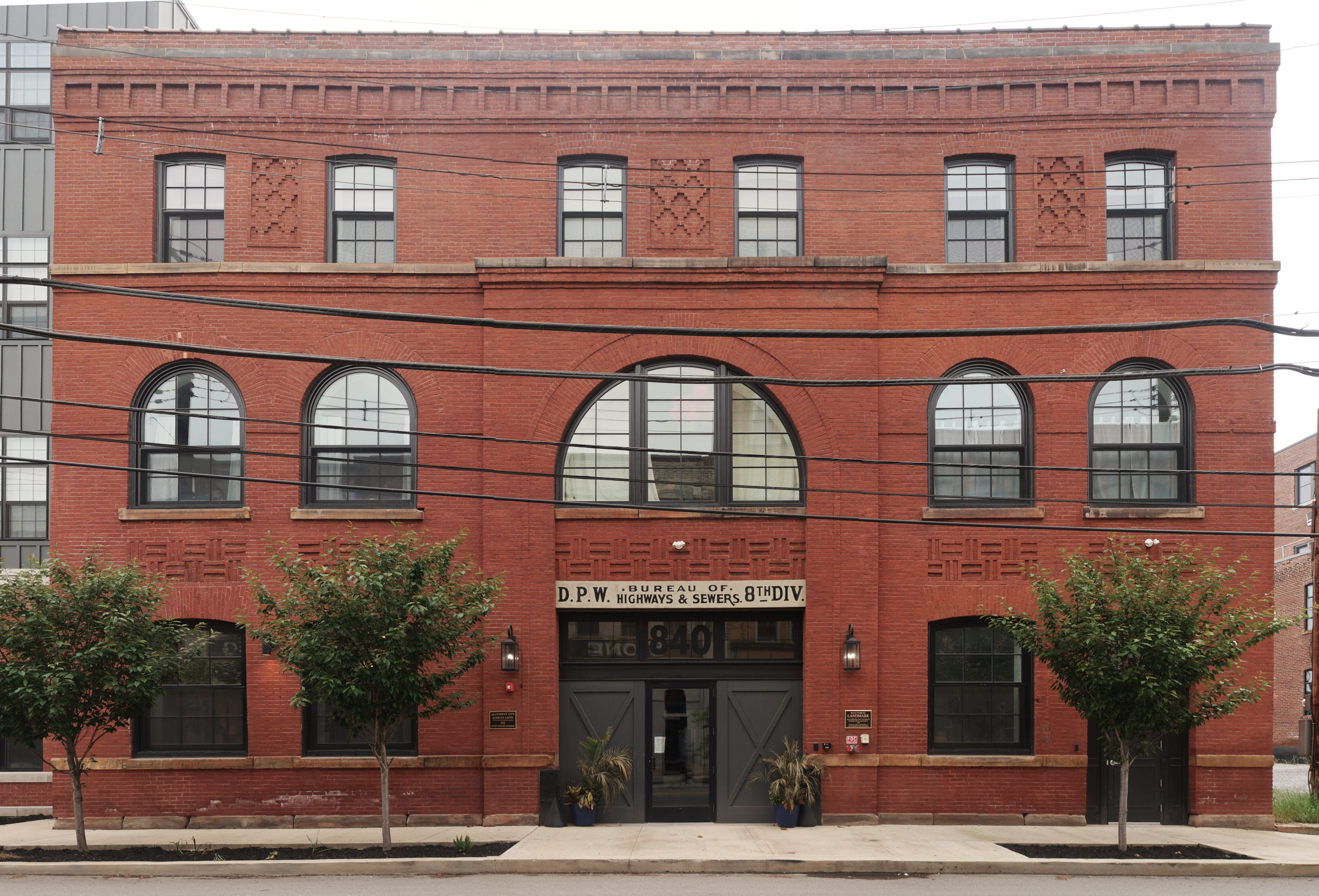
- The building in 2024

- Location within Pittsburgh
- Location: 840 West North Avenue (Central Northside), Pittsburgh, Pennsylvania, USA
- Coordinates: 40°27′13.78″N 80°0′57.78″W
- Built: 1895
- Part of: Allegheny Second Ward Industrial Historic District (ID100011908)

Significant dates
- Designated CP: June 12, 2025
- Designated CPHD: July 7, 2007

The Allegheny City Stables, located at 840 W North Avenue in the Central North Side neighborhood of Pittsburgh, Pennsylvania, was built in 1895. The building was listed as a contributing property in the Allegheny Second Ward Industrial Historic District in 2025.

== History and architectural features ==
Robert Swan and Samuel Hastings constructed this 18,000-square-foot, three-story brick warehouse in Romanesque style. Noteworthy architectural details include parapets, brick diapering, and round-headed and segmental arched windows. The structure is significant for its association with the former City of Allegheny, having served as a public works and stables building. It housed the Department of Public Works and other offices on the first story, municipal and neighborhood horses on the second, and the resources for the horses on the third.

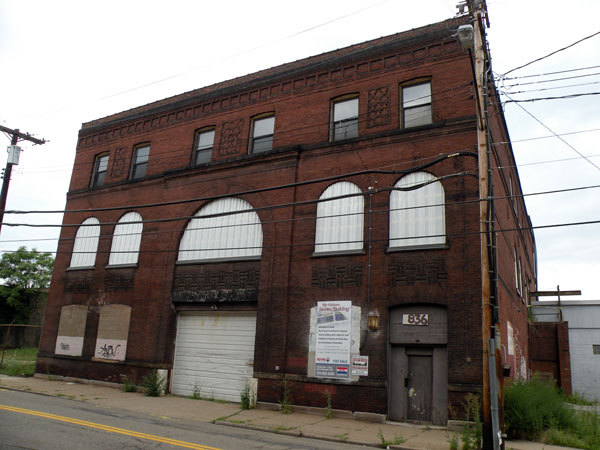
Allegheny City Stables in 2010, prior to being converted to loft apartments

Being the last surviving civic structure built by the government of Allegheny City, Allegheny City Stables began a neighborhood campaign led by the Allegheny West Civic Council, to save the old stables from demolition. The campaign was successful, and the stables building was added to the List of City of Pittsburgh historic designations on July 7, 2007. Still, the building remained vacant for over a decade.

From 2019 to 2021, Birgo Realty, a North Side based real estate developer and property management company, restored the abandoned Allegheny City Stables. As of September 2019, the building was under renovation as loft apartments, which encompassed the renovated stable building accompanied by 32,000 square feet of new addition. The new development was constructed on the adjacent lot to the west side of the Stables building as an addition to the existing building, seamlessly connected in the interior.

The new combined complex is called Allegheny City Stables Lofts, a residential community honoring the historical relevance of the Stables while adapting for a new purpose. The complex will include 36 units with a combination of studio, 1-bedroom, and 2-bedroom units. Rental rates are slated to be between $1,500 and $2,500 per month. Communal amenities will include a fitness center, guest suite, lounge, indoor parking spaces and a lobby that “tells the story and pays tribute to the history of the neighborhood,” according to a media release.
