= House at 200 West North Avenue =

Historic house in Pennsylvania, United States

- U.S. National Register of Historic Places
- U.S. Historic district – Contributing property
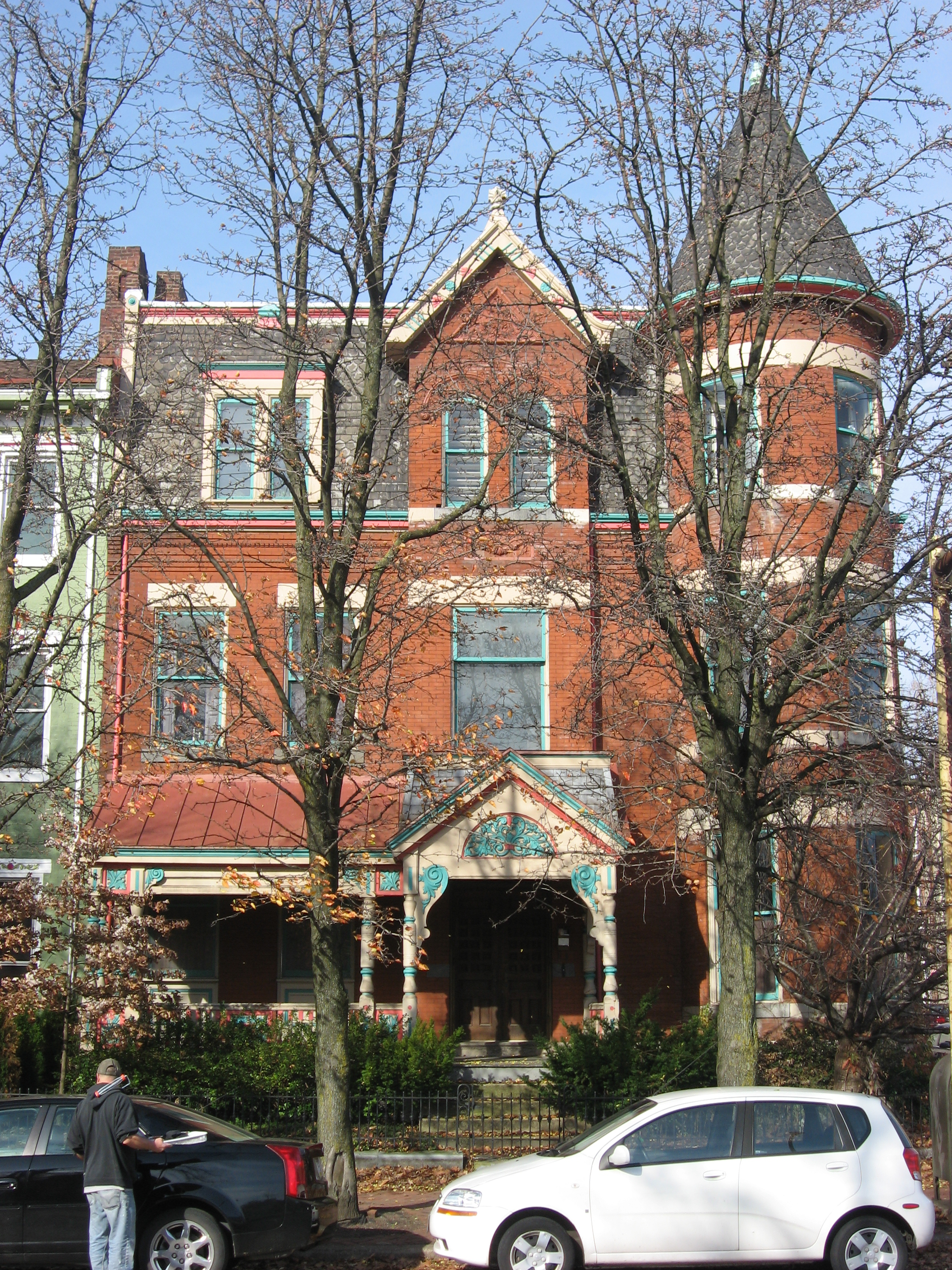
- Front of the house

- Location within Pittsburgh Location within Pennsylvania Location within the United States
- Location: 200 W. North Ave., Pittsburgh, Pennsylvania
- Coordinates: 40°27′25″N 80°0′32″W
- Area: 0.1 acres (0.040 ha)
- Built: 1890
- Architectural style: Queen Anne
- Part of: Mexican War Streets Historic District (ID08000845)
- NRHP reference No.: 86000305

Significant dates
- Added to NRHP: February 27, 1986
- Designated CP: September 4, 2008

The House at 200 West North Avenue in Pittsburgh, Pennsylvania was built in 1890 in the Queen Anne style. The house was likely built for Jasper M. Porter the Secretary/Treasurer of the Savage Fire-Brick Company. He owned the property until 1903. The house was listed on the National Register of Historic Places in 1986.
