= Republic Oil Refining Company =

US Oil and Shipping Company

- Industry: Oil, Shipping
- Founded: 1926
- Defunct: April 1, 1957
- Fate: Dissolved
- Key people: Herbert D. McCracken; Ovid D. Robinson; Otto C. Massey; John M Gardiner; Daniel H. Lee; James Carney; William E. Huston; John Gardine
- Parent: Benedum-Trees

Republic Oil Sales Company was founded on May 13, 1926, in Fort Worth, Texas by Herbert D. McCracken. In 1929 the Republic Oil Refining Company was founded in Pittsburgh at the Benedum-Trees Building with Ovid D. Robinson as president. Republic Oil Refining Company's vice president was James Carne and William H. Moreland as the secretary-treasurer. Republic Oil Refining Company had a field office in Houston, that moved to Texas City, Texas in 1935. Texas City is the location of the refinery. At its peak in 1931, the Texas City refinery had a capacity of 35,000 barrels daily and 1,250,000 barrels of tank storage. The company dissolved on April 1, 1957.

== Texas City disaster ==
Some of Republic Oil property was damaged and five employees killed in the Texas City disaster on April 16, 1947, at the Port of Texas City in Galveston Bay. Republic Oil Refining Company's firefighting team help put out the fire. The fire was caused by the French ship SS Grandcamp exploding her cargo of about 2,300 tons of ammonium nitrate.

== Ships ==
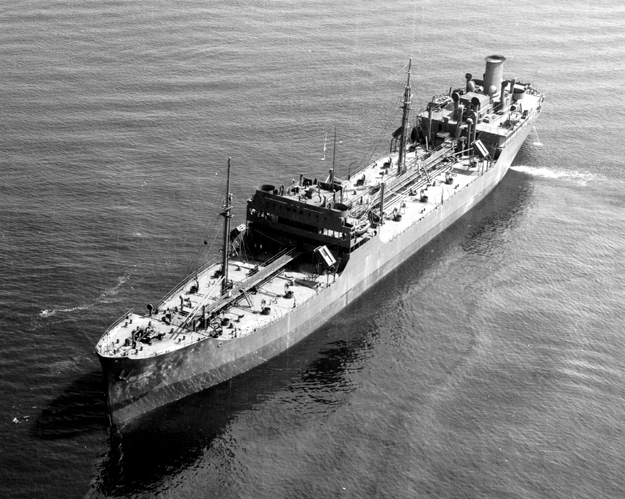
A T2 tanker, like the Gold Creek

Some of Republic Oil Refining ships:

- Gold Creek, 10,000 ton tanker T2 tanker (T2-SE-A1) ran aground south of Gay Head.
- Minneapolis Husky, 16,000 barrels tanker built at Ingalls Decatur in 1941. renamed Republic in 1944, Clark in 1954, Limni in 1964, and scrapped 1973
- Kawanee 1919 tanker, scrapped in 1945.

- Tug Republic No. 1 Tugboat
- Tug Republic No. 2. Built in 1943, by the Platzer Iron Works Company of Houston as the R.J. Gough.
- Oil Barges: ROR 104, Barge ROR 105, Barge ROR 106

== World War II ==
Republic Oil Refining fleet of ships that were used to help the World War II effort. During World War II Republic Oil Refining operated Merchant navy ships for the United States Shipping Board. During World War II Republic Oil Refining was active with charter shipping with the Maritime Commission and War Shipping Administration. The ship was run by its Republic Oil Refining crew and the US Navy supplied United States Navy Armed Guards to man the deck guns and radio.

== See also ==
- World War II United States Merchant Navy
