= Garden Theater =

Former movie theater in Pittsburgh

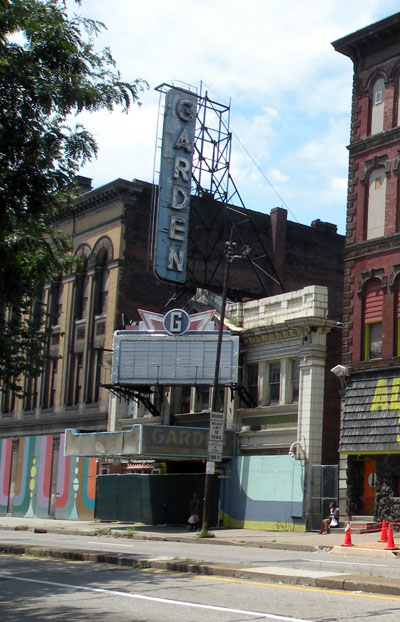

- Location within Pittsburgh
- 40°27′19.76″N 80°0′26.16″W
- Location: 12 West North Avenue; Pittsburgh, Pennsylvania, USA

History
- Built: 1915

Site notes
- Architect: Thomas H. Scott
- Architectural style: Beaux Arts
- Governing body: City of Pittsburgh

The Garden Theater (or Garden Theatre) is a 1,000-seat theater that was built in 1915 at 12 West North Avenue in the Central Northside neighborhood of Pittsburgh, Pennsylvania, USA. Formerly a movie theater, it closed in 2007 and has not been in use much since that time, except for a scene in the movie adaptation of One for the Money starring Katherine Heigl filmed in July 2010. The city of Pittsburgh hopes to revitalize the theater, and it was placed on the List of City of Pittsburgh historic designations by the Pittsburgh City Council on March 25, 2008.

== History ==
Built in 1914, and designed by architect Thomas H. Scott and financed by David E. Park, a steel-industry scion and banker, the Garden Theater exhibits a Beaux Arts style. According to a 14-page Historical American Buildings Survey data sheet from 1978, "motion picture theaters became more substantial and dignified than the earlier Nickelodeons. The Garden Theater is a typical little-changed neighborhood movie house of this century's second decade." Bennett Amdursky managed the theater from the time it opened, purchased it from Park's son in 1924, and ran it until his death in 1970. The theater "became the pride of his life," the historical survey states. "He worked at the theatre daily until his death in the spring of 1970, over a half-century later." After he died, things changed. In 1973, the pornographic film Deep Throat played there, and did quite well, and soon after the Garden became known as an adult movie theater. It was a porn theater for 34 years thereafter, until it closed in 2007. The auditorium was demolished sometime between 2012 and 2014. However, the lobby building is being renovated.

== Film depictions ==
- The 1979 sports/cult classic The Fish That Saved Pittsburgh used the Garden Theater and its surrounding neighborhood as the home of the film's astrologist heroine Mona (Stockard Channing) to depict a gritty inner-city gypsy fortune teller's residence.
- The 1995 TV adaptation of August Wilson's The Piano Lesson used the Garden Theater in a scene where Boy Willie and Lymon attend a movie in Pittsburgh.
- The 2010 film One for the Money starring Katherine Heigl uses the same exact buildings complete with the Garden Theater marquee to once again depict a gritty inner-city former burlesque district. This time, the theater and area around it are used to recreate a seedy Trenton, New Jersey, inner-city neighborhood.

== Redevelopment ==
In 2007, the Urban Redevelopment Authority of Pittsburgh purchased the building for $1.1 million. The theater along with several other buildings including the former Masonic Hall located in the same block along North Avenue, were later sold to a Philadelphia-based development company.

The Theater has now been purchased and redeveloped by Trek Development and Q Development. The building now features 76 apartments that will open July 2023.
