= Aberlie House =

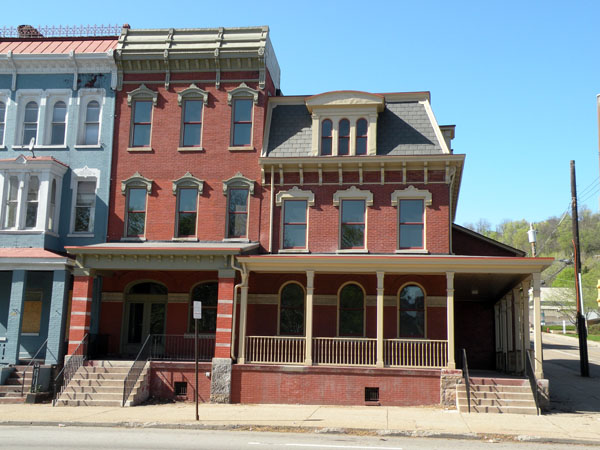

- Location within Pittsburgh
- 40°27′21.55″N 80°0′17.32″W
- Location: 122-124 East North Avenue (Central Northside), Pittsburgh, Pennsylvania, US

History
- Built: circa 1880

Aberlie House at 122-124 East North Avenue in the Central Northside neighborhood of Pittsburgh, Pennsylvania, was likely built circa 1880. It was added to the List of City of Pittsburgh historic designations on February 13, 2001.
