= Walt Bowyer =

American football player (born 1960)

No. 65, 68
- Position: Defensive end

Personal information
- Born: September 8, 1960 (age 66); Pittsburgh, Pennsylvania, U.S.
- Listed height: 6 ft 4 in (1.93 m)
- Listed weight: 254 lb (115 kg)

Career information
- High school: Wilkinsburg (Wilkinsburg, Pennsylvania)
- College: Arizona State (1979–1982)
- NFL draft: 1983: 10th round, 254th overall pick

Career history
- Denver Broncos (1983–1984); Edmonton Eskimos (1985); Denver Broncos (1986)*; BC Lions (1987)*; Denver Broncos (1987–1988); Kansas City Chiefs (1989)*
- * Offseason or practice squad member only

Career NFL statistics
- Sacks: 6.5
- Fumble recoveries: 2
- Interceptions: 1
- Stats at Pro Football Reference

Walter Nathaniel Bowyer Jr. (born September 8, 1960) is an American former professional football player who was a defensive end for four seasons with the Denver Broncos of the National Football League (NFL). He was selected by the Broncos in the 10th round of the 1983 NFL draft after playing college football for the Arizona State Sun Devils. Bowyer also played for the Edmonton Eskimos of the Canadian Football League (CFL).

== Early life and college ==
Walter Nathaniel Bowyer Jr. was born on September 8, 1960, in Pittsburgh, Pennsylvania. He attended Wilkinsburg High School in Wilkinsburg, Pennsylvania.

Bowyer was a four-year letterman for the Sun Devils of Arizona State University from 1979 to 1982.

== Professional career ==
Bowyer was selected by the Denver Broncos in the tenth round, with the 254th overall pick, of the 1983 NFL draft. He played in 14 games, starting three, for the Broncos during his rookie year in 1983, recording two sacks and one fumble recovery. He also appeared in one playoff game that year. Bowyer played in all 16 games, starting one, during the 1984 season, totaling three sacks and one fumble recovery. He played in one postseason game during the 1984 season as well. He was released by the Broncos on August 27, 1985.

Bowyer dressed in one game for the Edmonton Eskimos of the Canadian Football League (CFL) in 1985 and posted two sacks.

He signed a futures contract with the Broncos on December 13, 1985. He was later released on September 1, 1986.

Bowyer was signed by the BC Lions of the CFL on May 17, 1987. However, on June 6, 1987, it was reported that Bowyer had been cut by the Lions.

Bowyer signed with the Broncos for the third time on August 19, 1987. He played in 15 games, starting three, for the Broncos that year and recorded 0.5 sacks. He also played in three playoff games that season. Bowyer was released on August 30, 1988, but re-signed on September 1, 1988. He appeared in all 16 games, starting a career-high 11, for Denver in 1988, totaling one sack and one interception. He became a free agent after the 1988 season.

Bowyer signed with the Kansas City Chiefs on March 3, 1989. He was released on August 31, 1989.
