= Benedum–Trees Building =

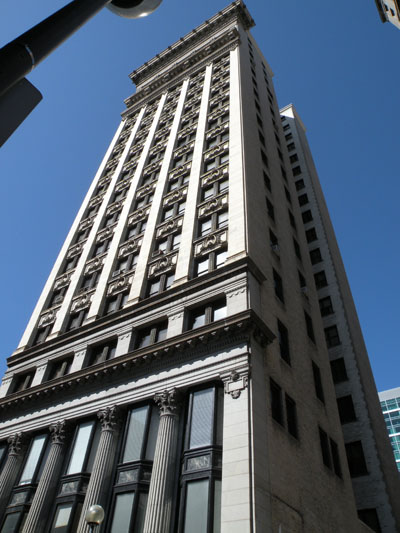

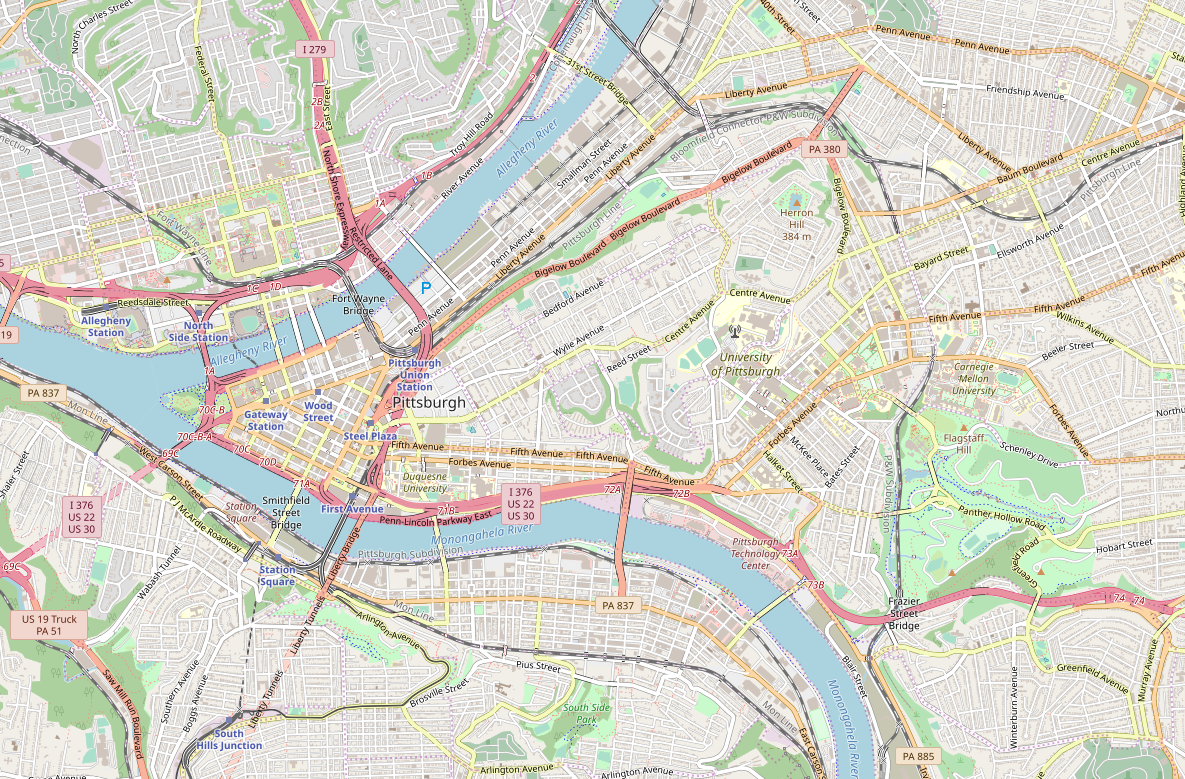
- Location of Benedum–Trees Building in Downtown Pittsburgh Benedum–Trees Building (Pennsylvania) Benedum–Trees Building (the United States)
- 40°26′23.25″N 80°0′7.76″W
- Location: 223 Fourth Avenue (Downtown), Pittsburgh, Pennsylvania, USA

History
- Built: 1905

Site notes
- Architect: Thomas H. Scott

Pittsburgh Landmark – PHLF
- Designated: 1973

The Benedum–Trees Building, which is located at 223 Fourth Avenue in downtown Pittsburgh, Pennsylvania, was built in 1905. It was commissioned by Caroline Jones Machesney, the daughter and sole heir of a Pittsburgh banker, making it the first skyscraper in the city ordered by and built for a woman.

== History and architectural features ==
The Benedum–Trees Building was originally called the Machesney Building until 1913, when Machesney sold it for $10 million to Joe Trees and Michael Late Benedum, two local men who had made their fortunes by drilling for oil. For the next forty years, the fifteenth floor was home to their offices.

The building, designed by Thomas H. Scott, was added to the List of Pittsburgh History and Landmarks Foundation Historic Landmarks in 1973. The building is 19 stories tall.

Benedum Trees Oil Company was founded in 1904, by Michael Late Benedum and Joe Trees in Wheeling, West Virginia. In 1929, Benedum Trees opened a subsidiary Republic Oil Refining Company in Texas City, Texas.
