= George Washington Gale Ferris Jr. =

American civil engineer (1859–1896)

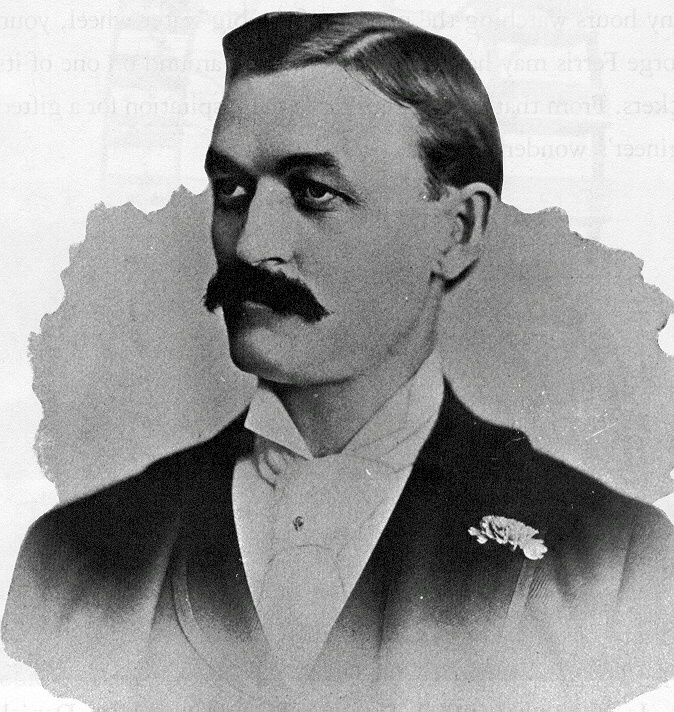
- Born: February 14, 1859; Galesburg, Illinois, US
- Died: November 22, 1896 (aged 37); Pittsburgh, Pennsylvania, US
- Education: Rensselaer Polytechnic Institute (1881)
- Occupation: Civil engineer
- Known for: The original Chicago Ferris Wheel and the Ferris wheel concept

George Washington Gale Ferris Jr. (February 14, 1859 – November 22, 1896) was an American civil engineer. He is mostly known for creating the original Ferris Wheel for the 1893 Chicago World's Columbian Exposition.

== Early life ==
Ferris was born on February 14, 1859, in Galesburg, Illinois, the town founded by his namesake, George Washington Gale. His parents were George Washington Gale Ferris Sr. and Martha Edgerton Hyde. He had an older brother named Frederick Hyde, born in 1843. In 1864 when Ferris was five years old, his family sold their dairy farm and moved to Nevada. For two years, they lived in Carson Valley.

From 1868 to 1890, his father, George Washington Gale Ferris Sr., owned the Sears–Ferris House at 311 W. Third, Carson City, Nevada. Originally built in about 1863 by Gregory A. Sears, a pioneer Carson City businessman, the residence was added to the National Register of Historic Places for Carson City on February 9, 1979.

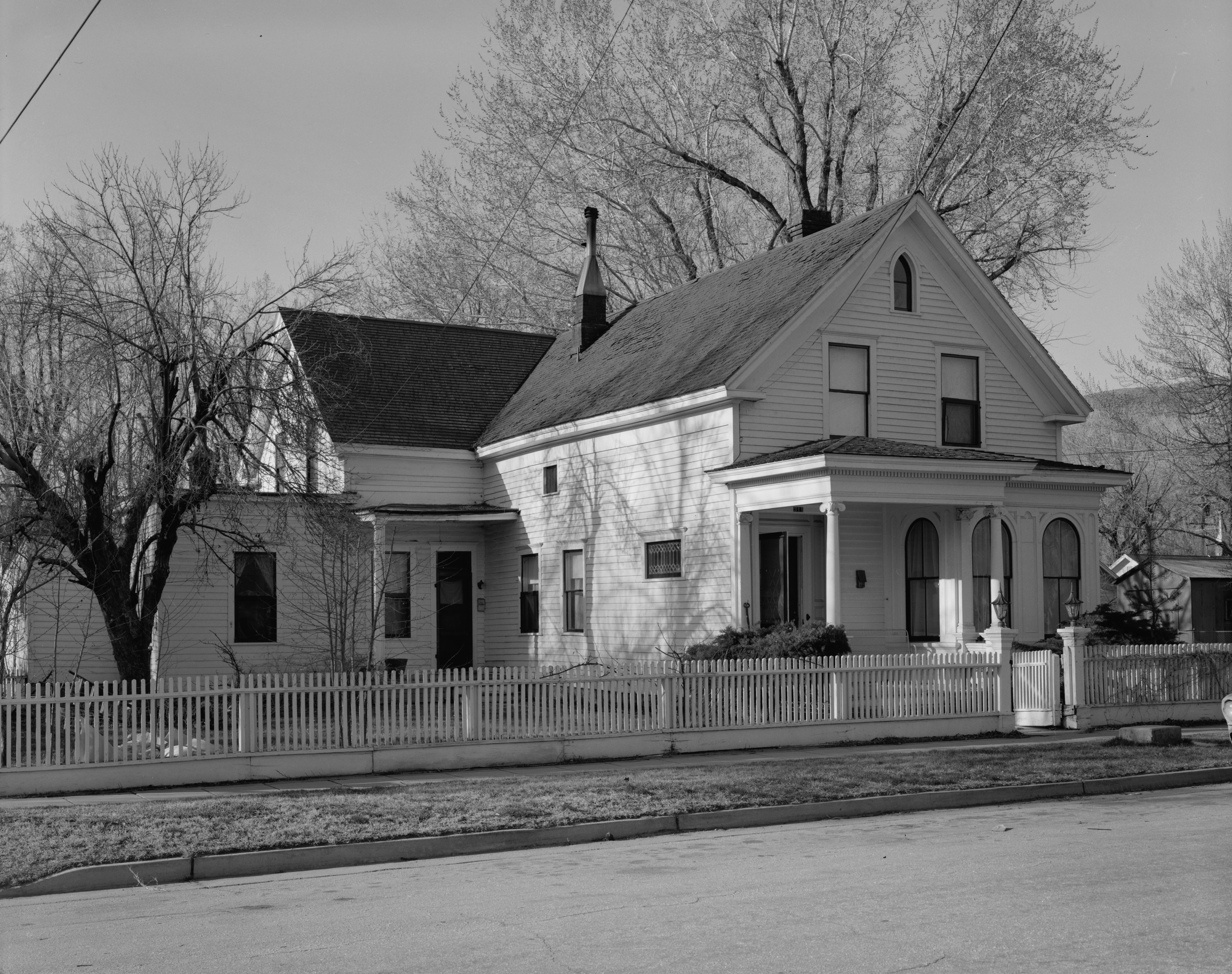
Sears–Ferris House, Carson City

Ferris Senior was an agriculturalist/horticulturalist, noteworthy in Carson City's development for much of the city's landscaping during the 1870s, and for importing a large number of the trees from the east that were planted throughout the city.

Ferris left Nevada in 1875 to attend the California Military Academy in Oakland, where he graduated in 1876. He graduated from Rensselaer Polytechnic Institute (RPI) in Troy, New York, in the class of 1881 with a degree in Civil Engineering. At RPI he was a charter member of the local chapter of the Chi Phi student fraternity. and a member of the Rensselaer Society of Engineers. He was made a member of the RPI Alumni Hall of Fame in 1998.

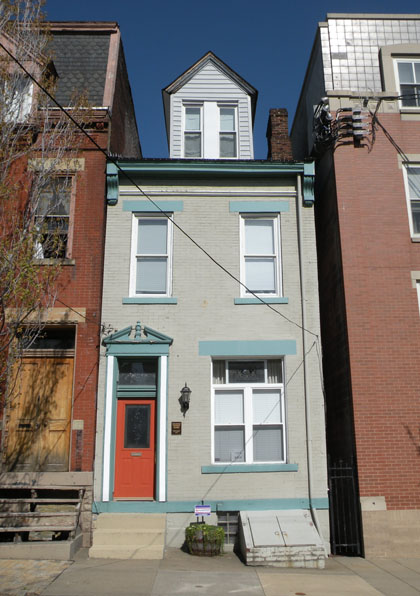
Ferris House, Pittsburgh

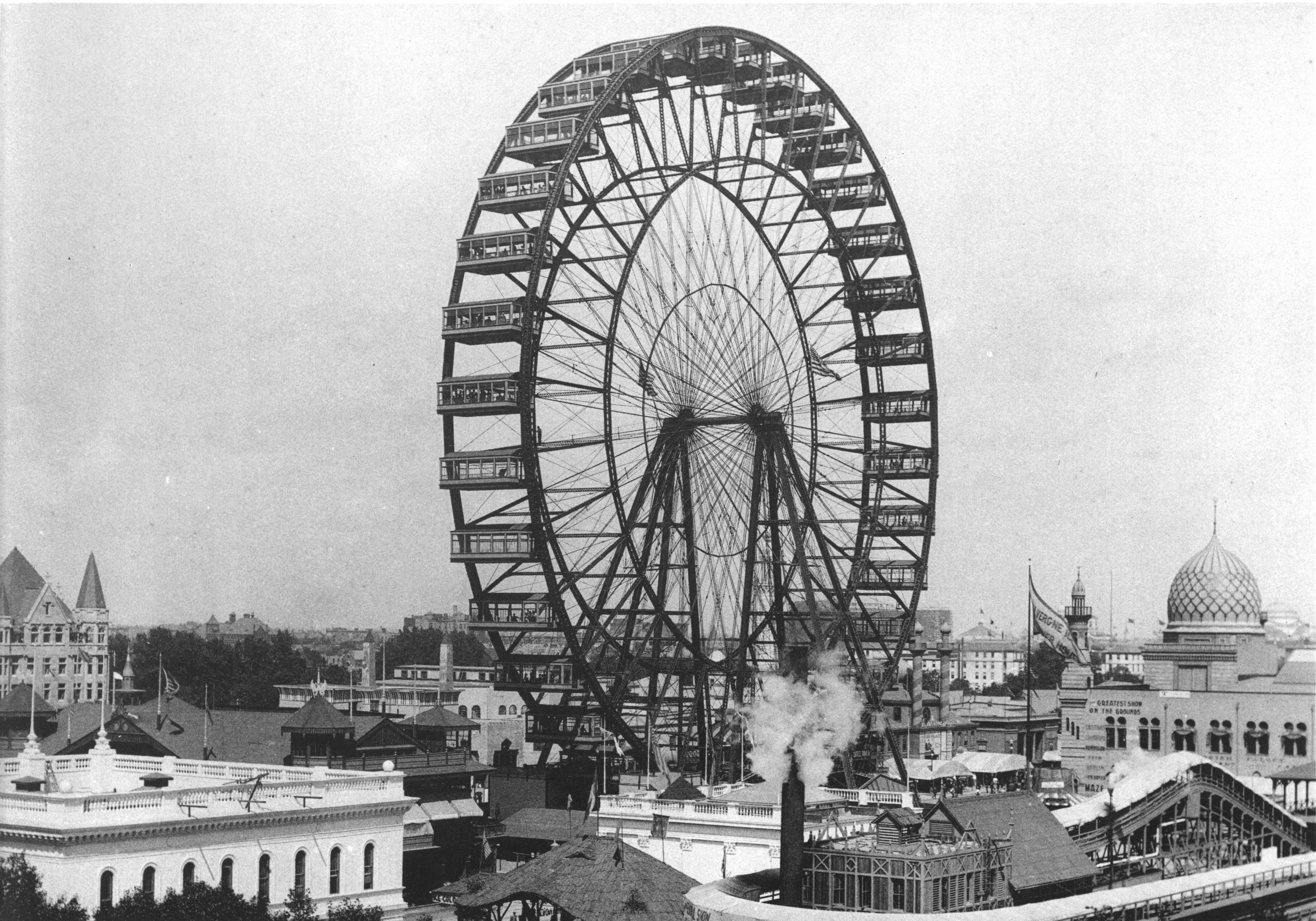
The original 1893 Chicago Ferris Wheel

Ferris began his career in the railroad industry and was interested in bridge building. He founded a company, G.W.G. Ferris & Co. in Pittsburgh, Pennsylvania, to test and inspect metals for railroads and bridge builders.

Ferris House, his home at 1318 Arch Street, Central Northside, was added to the list of City of Pittsburgh Designated Historic Structures on June 28, 2001.

== Ferris wheel ==
News of the World's Columbian Exposition to be held in 1893, in Chicago, Illinois, drew Ferris to the city. In 1891, the Exposition's directors issued a challenge to American engineers to conceive of an attraction for the fair that would surpass the Eiffel Tower, the great structure built for the Paris International Exposition of 1889. The planners wanted something "original, daring, and unique". Ferris proposed a wheel from which visitors could view the entire exhibition, a wheel that would "out-Eiffel Eiffel".

Ferris returned in a few weeks with several respectable endorsements from established engineers, and the committee agreed to allow construction to begin. Most convincingly, he had recruited several local investors to cover the $400,000 cost of construction.

The Ferris Wheel had 36 cars, each fitted with 40 revolving chairs and able to accommodate up to 60 people, giving a total capacity of 2,160. When the fair opened, it carried some 38,000 passengers daily, taking 20 minutes to complete two revolutions—the first involving six stops to allow passengers to enter and exit, and the second a nine-minute non-stop rotation, for which the ticket holder paid 50 cents. It carried 2.5 million passengers before it was finally demolished in 1906.

After the fair closed, Ferris claimed that the exhibition management had robbed him and his investors of their portion of the nearly $750,000 profit that his wheel brought in. He spent the next two years in litigation.

== Death ==
Ferris Sr. died in 1895, followed soon after by Ferris Jr. himself, on November 22, 1896, at Mercy Hospital in Pittsburgh, Pennsylvania, of typhoid fever. His ashes remained at a Pittsburgh crematorium for over a year, waiting for someone to take possession of them.
