= Sears–Ferris House =

Historic house in Nevada, United States

- U.S. National Register of Historic Places
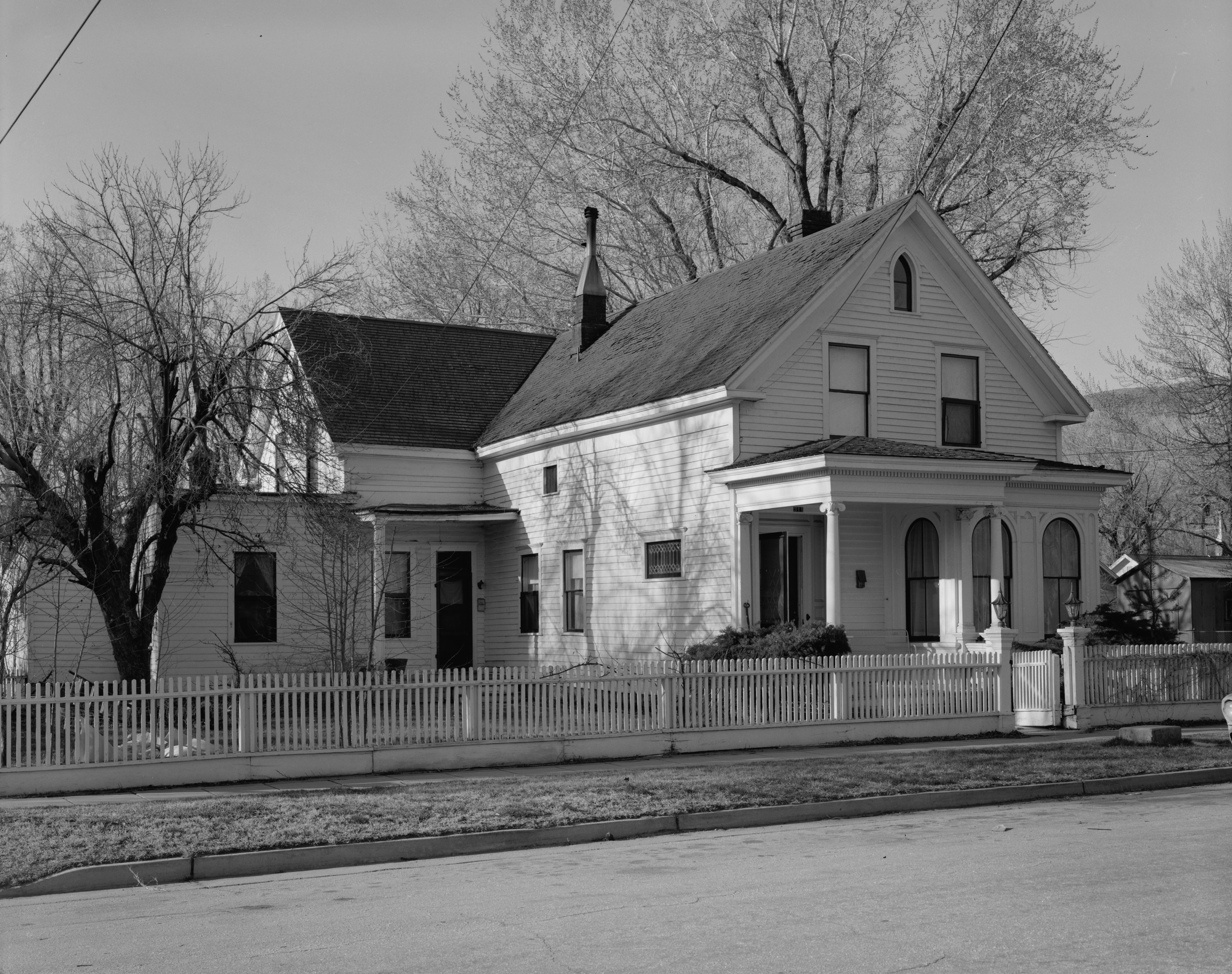

- Location within Nevada Location within the United States
- Location: 311 W Third Street, Carson City, Nevada
- Coordinates: 39°9′44.5″N 119°46′9.4″W
- Area: 0.3 acres (0.12 ha)
- Built: c.1863
- Built by: Sears, Gregory Alvin
- Architectural style: Colonial Revival, Georgian Revival
- NRHP reference No.: 79003438
- Added to NRHP: February 9, 1979

The Sears–Ferris House, at 311 W Third Street in Carson City, Nevada, is a historic house built in 1863. It was owned from 1868 to 1890 by George Washington Gale Ferris Sr., father of George Washington Gale Ferris Jr., future inventor of the Ferris wheel. It has also been known as the G. W. G. Ferris House.

Originally built in about 1863 by Gregory A. Sears, a pioneer Carson City businessman, the house was added to the National Register of Historic Places for Carson City in 1979.

It includes Colonial Revival and Georgian Revival architecture. This house is square in size and its measure is roughly sixty by sixty feet. It is currently under private ownership and not open to the public.

== History ==
Along with his family, Mr. Ferris arrived in Nevada as a gentleman farmer in 1864. Besides cultivating normal crops, he planted quite a few diversified trees. Mr. Ferris brought in many Eastern ornamental plants like hickory, black walnut and chestnut to Carson City. Several of those trees are at the Nevada State Capitol grounds.

George Washington Gale Ferris Jr., born in Galesburg, Illinois in 1859, was the most notable person related to this house. He was a little boy when his family moved from their homestead in Carson Valley to the residence in Carson City. He graduated from military school in 1875. Later in 1881, Ferris Jr. completed his education in engineering from Rensselaer Polytechnic Institute. He became famous in 1893 for inventing the Ferris Wheel situated at the World's Columbian Exposition in Chicago.

George Washington Gale Ferris Sr. along with his wife Martha relocated to Riverside, California in 1881. Ferris Sr. sold the residence including a part of the block to his daughter, Mary Ferris Ardery, in 1890 for $3,000. Mary changed the style of the front porch to a classical look.

In the twentieth century, the residence has been purchased by a number of different owners. Among them was the Mahers family which purchased the home in 1922 and Thurman Cross who bought the property in 1956. In 1968, Ferdinand Hirzy took the ownership of the residence and Mr and Mrs Charles Herron moved into the house in July 1968.
