= Wilkinsburg School District =

Public school district in Pittsburgh, Pennsylvania

Address
- 718 Wallace Avenue Wilkinsburg, Allegheny County, Pennsylvania, 15221-2215; United States

District information
- Type: Public
- Grades: Preschool – 12th

Other information
- Website: www.wilkinsburgschools.org

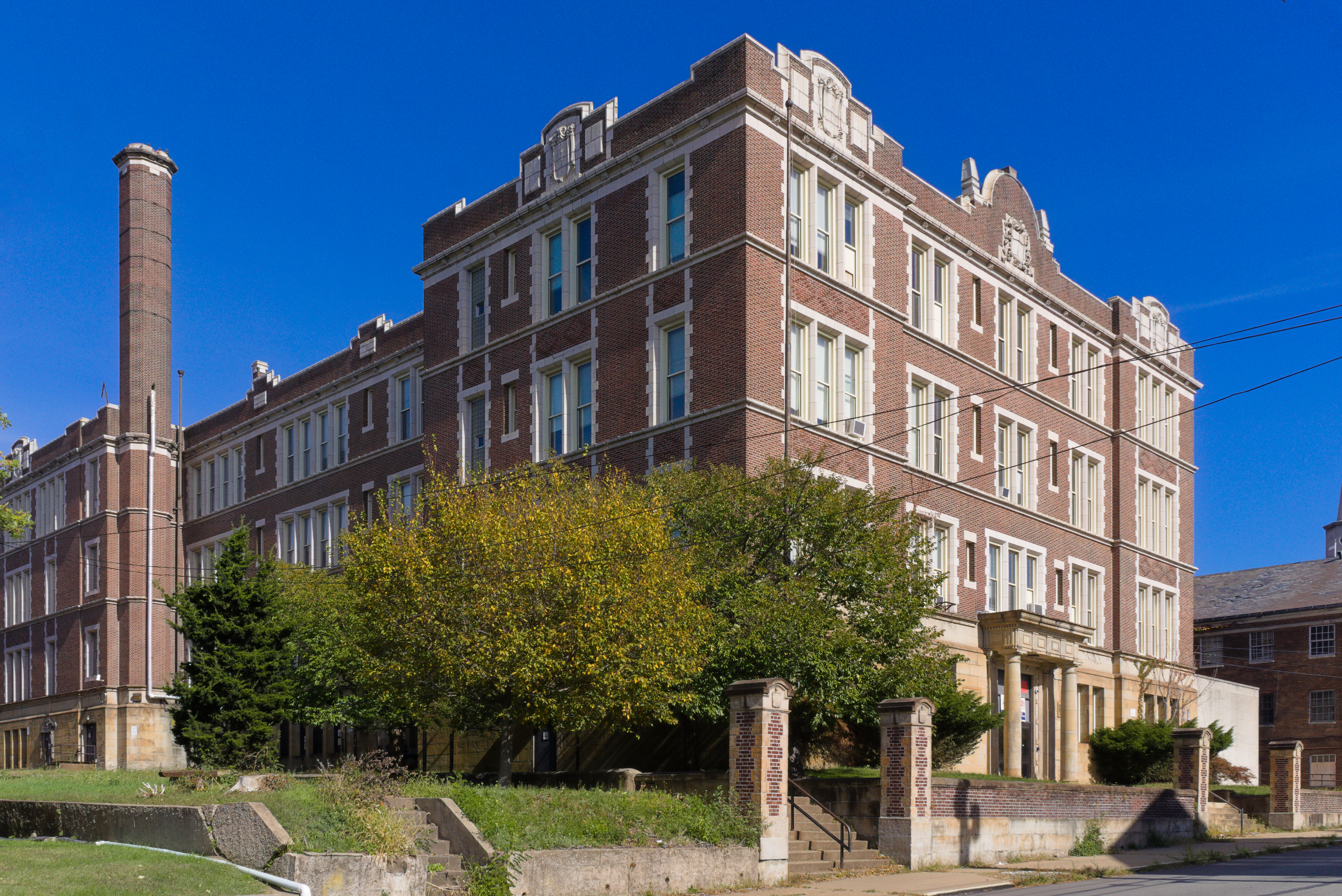
Wilkinsburg High School

The Wilkinsburg School District is a small, urban public school district serving the mostly African American Municipality of Wilkinsburg, Pennsylvania. The district encompasses approximately 3 square miles (7.8 km^{2}). According to 2000 federal census data, it served a resident population of 19,196. By 2010, the district's population declined to 15,933 people. The educational attainment levels for the Wilkinsburg Borough School District population (25 years old and over) were 90% high school graduates and 28.5% college graduates. Wilkinsburg School District operates two schools, Kelly Primary School (pre-k to first grade) and Turner Intermediate School (2nd–6th grades). Students beyond sixth grade go to nearby Westinghouse High School in the adjacent Pittsburgh Public Schools district.

The Wilkinsburg High School building was constructed in 1910. and its design has been credited to architect Thomas H. Scott. In 1985, due to declining enrollment, grades 7-9 were transferred to Wilkinsburg High School.

== Notable alumni ==
- Jonathan Adams, actor, Chuck Larabee on Last Man Standing
- Walt Bowyer, former professional football player, Denver Broncos
- Kimmarie Johnson, actress and model
- Tex Richards, former college football player, 1910 Pittsburgh Panthers football team
