= Brown Chapel A.M.E. Church (Pittsburgh) =

Church in Pittsburgh, Pennsylvania, U.S.

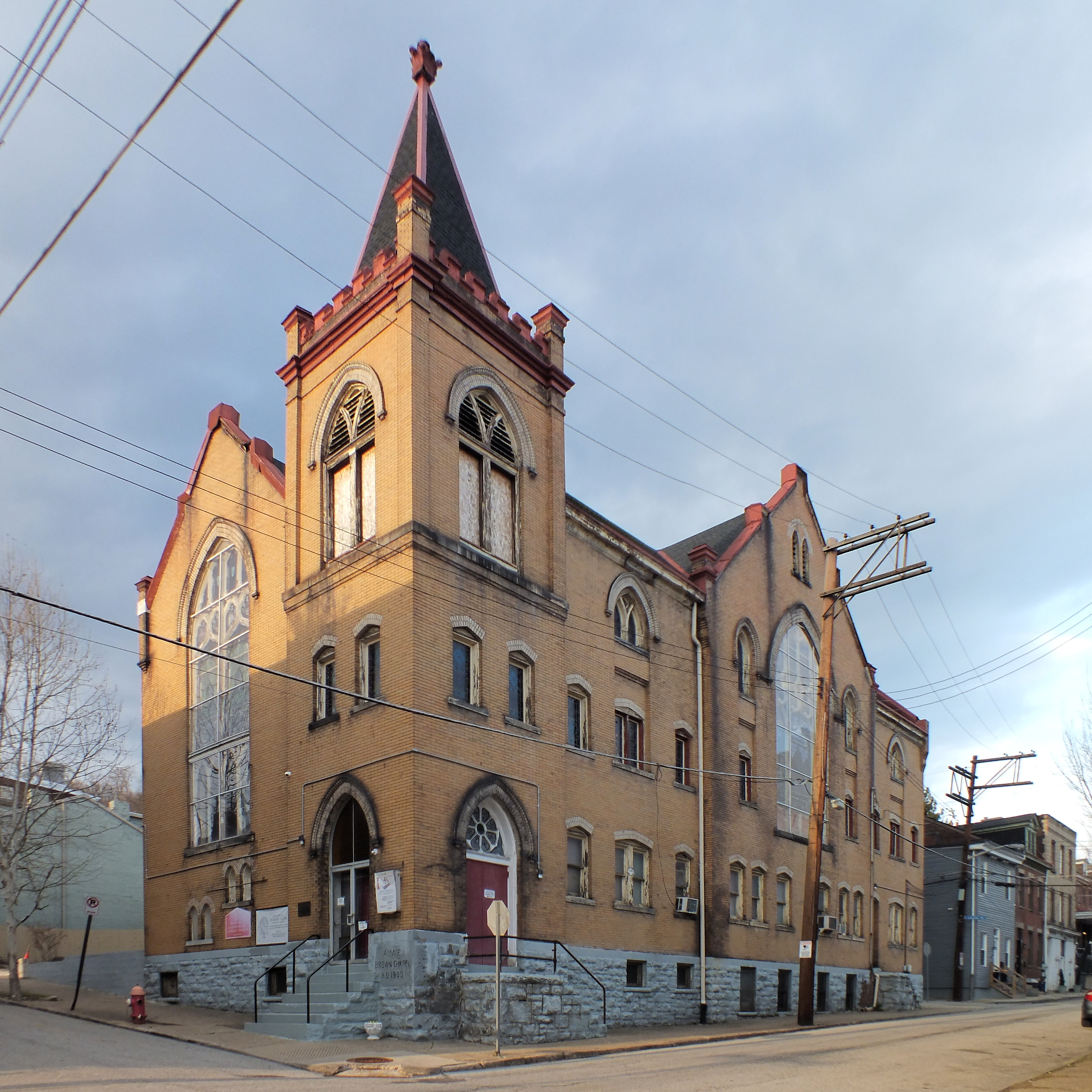

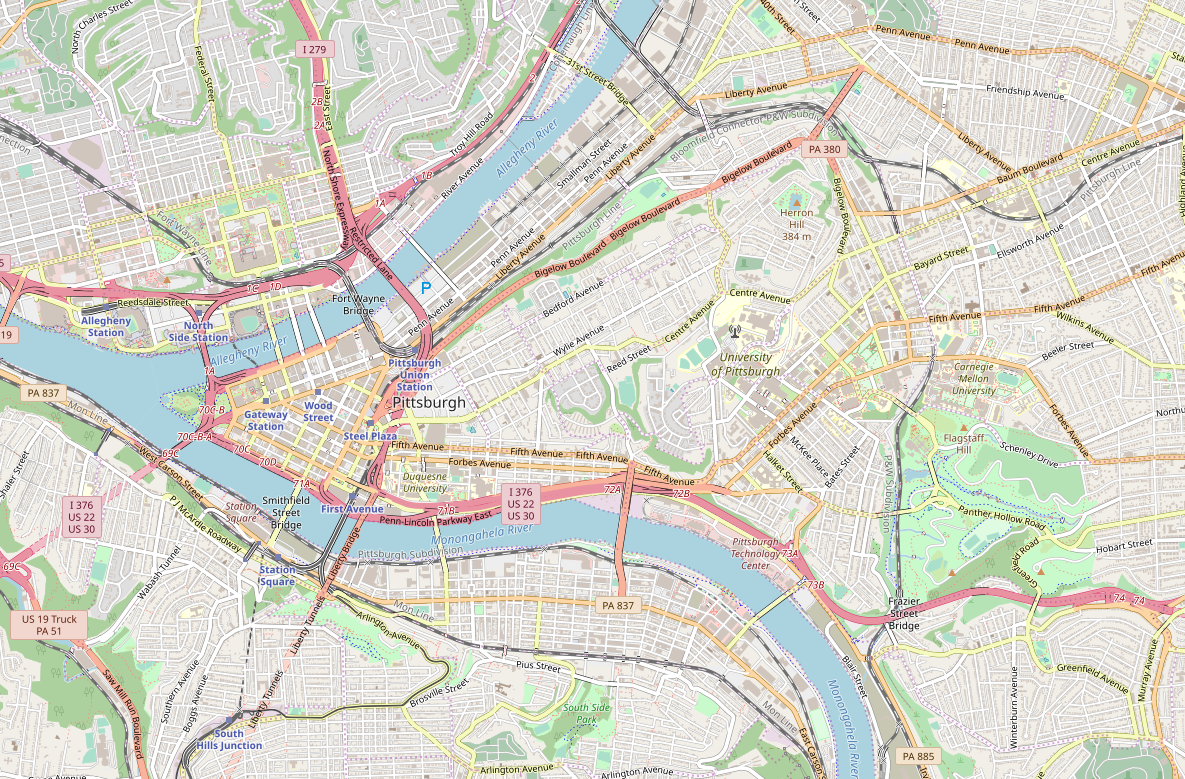
- Location of Brown Chapel A.M.E. Church in Downtown Pittsburgh
- 40°27′27.32″N 80°0′22.08″W
- Location: 1400 Boyle Street (Central Northside), Pittsburgh, Pennsylvania, USA

History
- Built: 1903

Pittsburgh Landmark – PHLF
- Designated: 1988

Brown Chapel A.M.E. Church located at 1400 Boyle Street in the Central Northside neighborhood of Pittsburgh, Pennsylvania, was built in 1903. This African Methodist Episcopal Church was added to the List of Pittsburgh History and Landmarks Foundation Historic Landmarks in 1988. The architect was Frederick C. Sauer.
