= Central Northside =

- Neighborhood of Pittsburgh
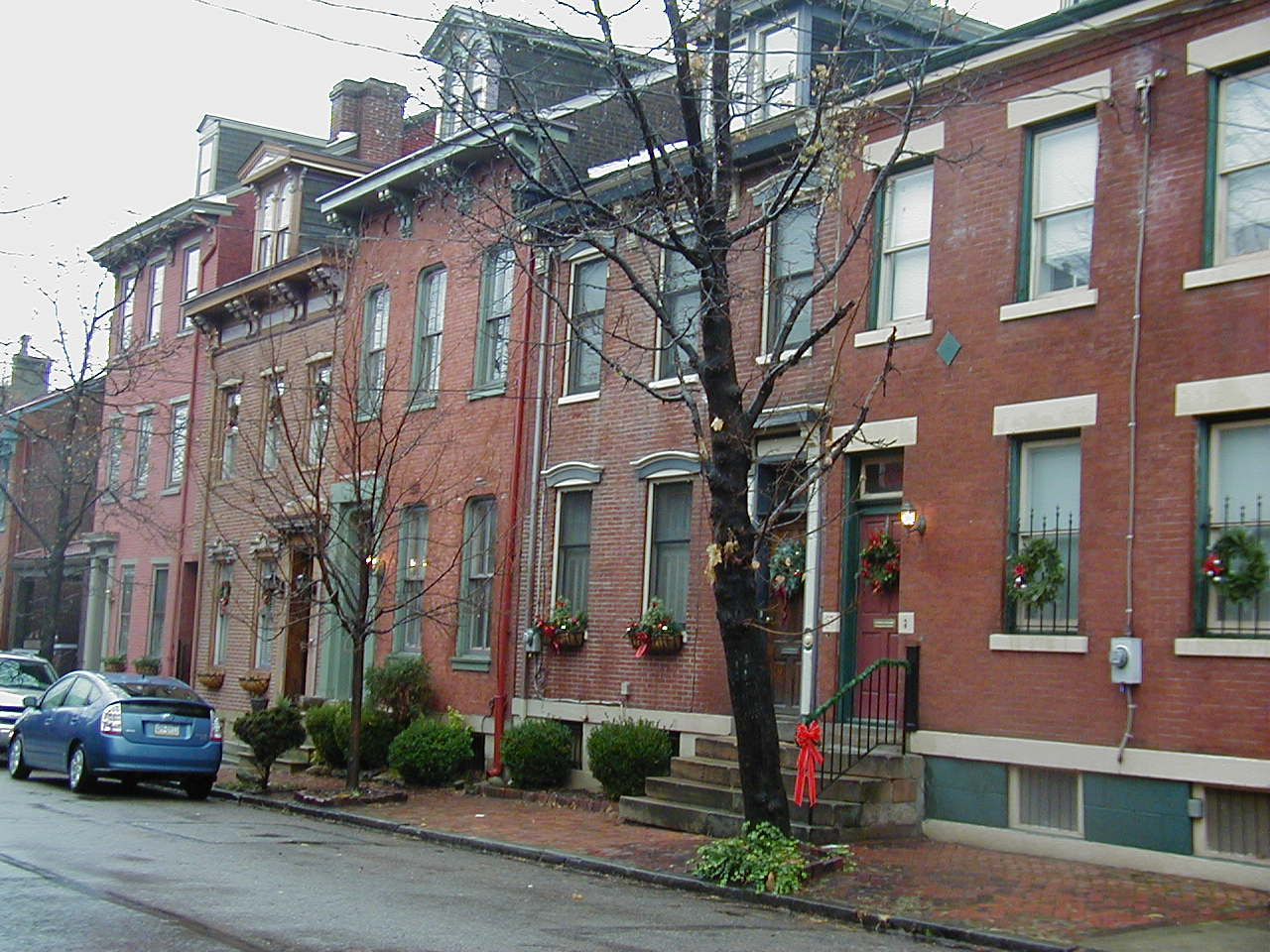

- Coordinates: 40.456°N 80.010°W
- Country: United States
- State: Pennsylvania
- County: Allegheny County
- City: Pittsburgh

Area
  - Total: 0.259 sq mi (0.67 km^{2})

Population (2010)
  - Total: 2,923
  - Density: 11,300/sq mi (4,360/km^{2})

Central Northside is a neighborhood in the North Side of the city of Pittsburgh, Pennsylvania. It has a zip code of 15212, and has representation on Pittsburgh City Council by the council member for District 6 (Downtown/Northshore Neighborhoods). Originally known as "The Buena Vista Tract", it is densely filled with restored row houses, community gardens and tree lined streets and alleyways.

== History ==
In the late 19th century, Allegheny, Pennsylvania (later annexed by Pittsburgh) became known for its stately homes, occupied by some of the area's wealthy families. One such area became known as the Mexican War Streets.

=== Mexican War Streets ===
The Mexican War Streets were laid out in 1847, during the Mexican–American War, by William Robinson Jr., ex-mayor of the city of Allegheny. Robinson, who contrary to some tellings did not actually serve in the war, subdivided his land and named the new streets after the war's battles and generals (Buena Vista Street, Filson Way, Monterey Street, Palo Alto Street, Resaca Place, Sherman Avenue, Taylor Avenue).

== City Steps ==
The Central Northside neighborhood has 4 distinct flights of city steps. In Central Northside, the public stairways in Pittsburgh quickly connect pedestrians to public transportation and neighborhood schools.

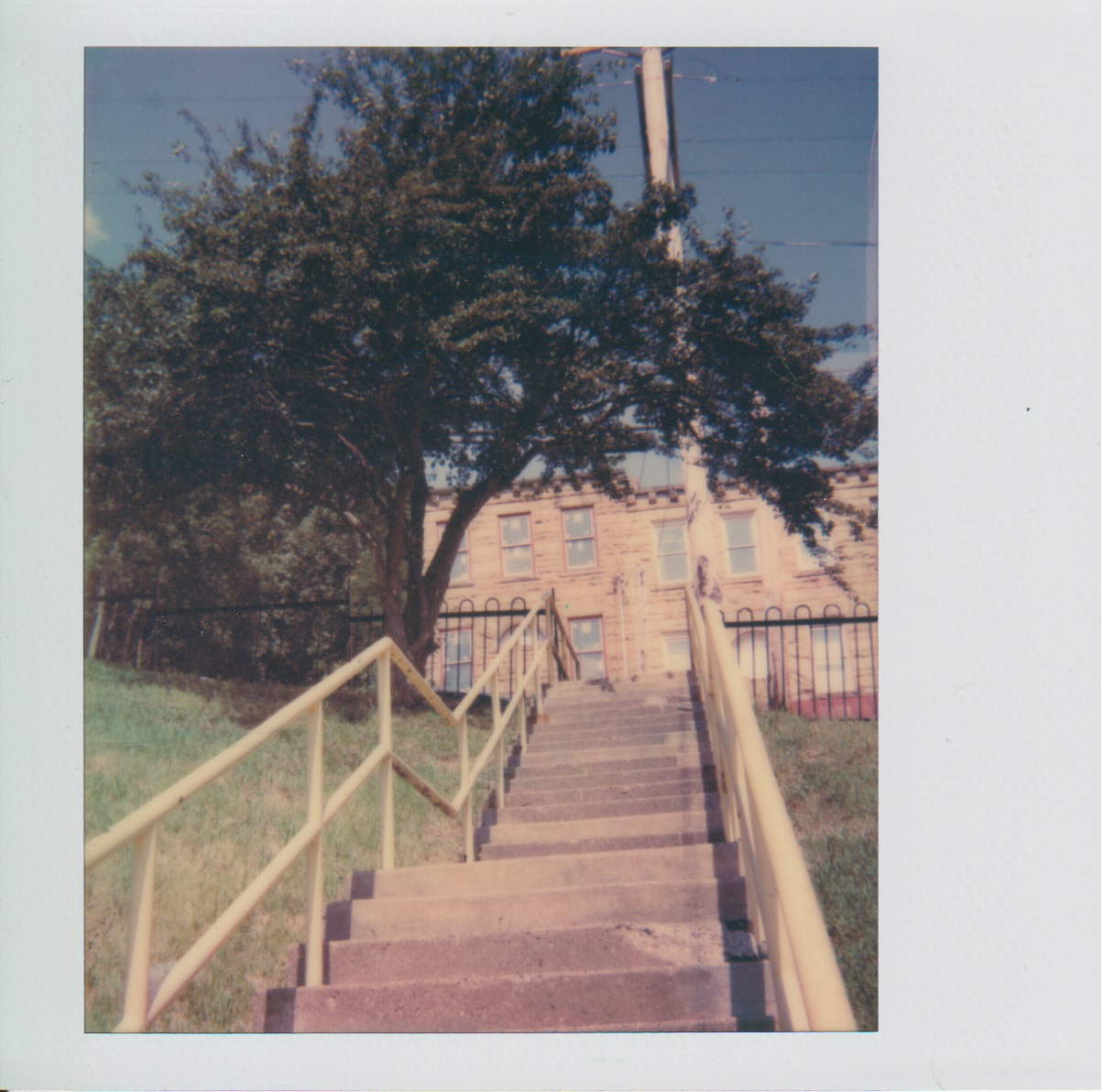
The O'Hern Street city steps connect residents to the Propel Northside charter school.

== Surrounding Pittsburgh neighborhoods ==
Central Northside has seven city neighborhood borders with Perry South to the north, Fineview to the northeast, East Allegheny to the southeast, Allegheny Center to the south, Allegheny West to the southwest, Manchester to the west and California-Kirkbride to the northwest.

== Fictional Portrayals ==
- The 1979 sports/cult classic The Fish That Saved Pittsburgh used the neighborhoods southern border of North Avenue's gritty former "burlesque row" adjacent to the Garden Theater to depict Stockard Channing's gypsy fortune teller characters office and residence.
- Thirty years later, in 2010, the Katherine Heigl film One for the Money uses the same exact buildings complete with Garden Theater marquee to once again depict a gritty inner city environment—though much of the characters and vice of the North Avenue corridor has been corrected, the structures still adapt well on the areas southern border.

== Gallery ==
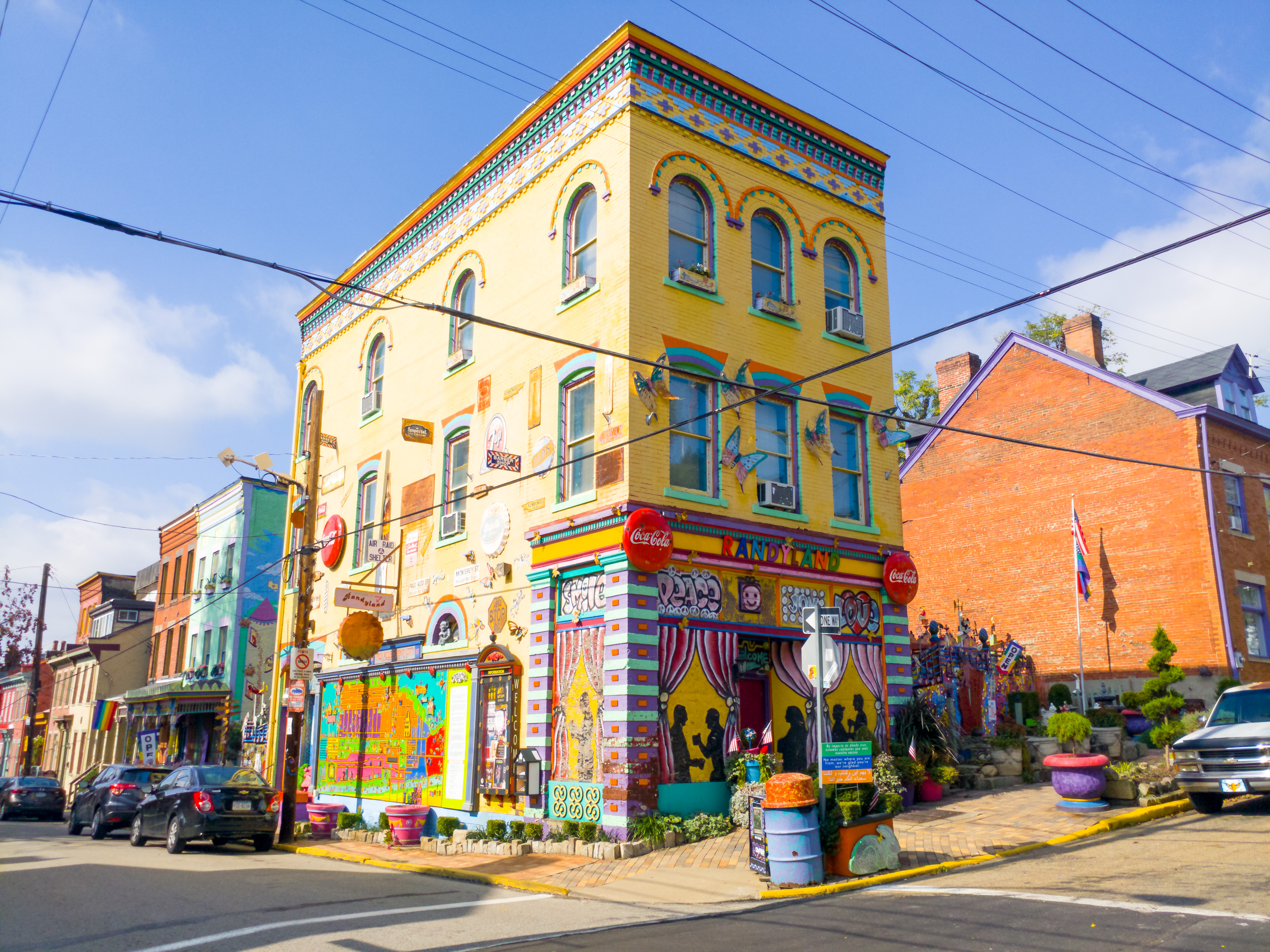
Randyland Art Museum at 1501 Arch Street.

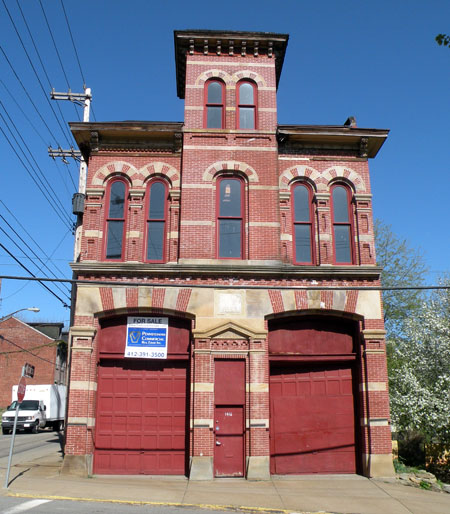
Engine Company No. 3, built in 1877, at 1416 Arch Street.

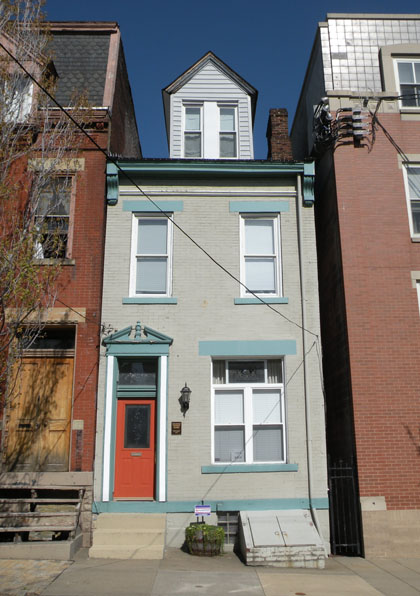
Ferris House (the former home of George Washington Gale Ferris Jr.), likely built in the mid-to-late 19th century, at 1318 Arch Street.

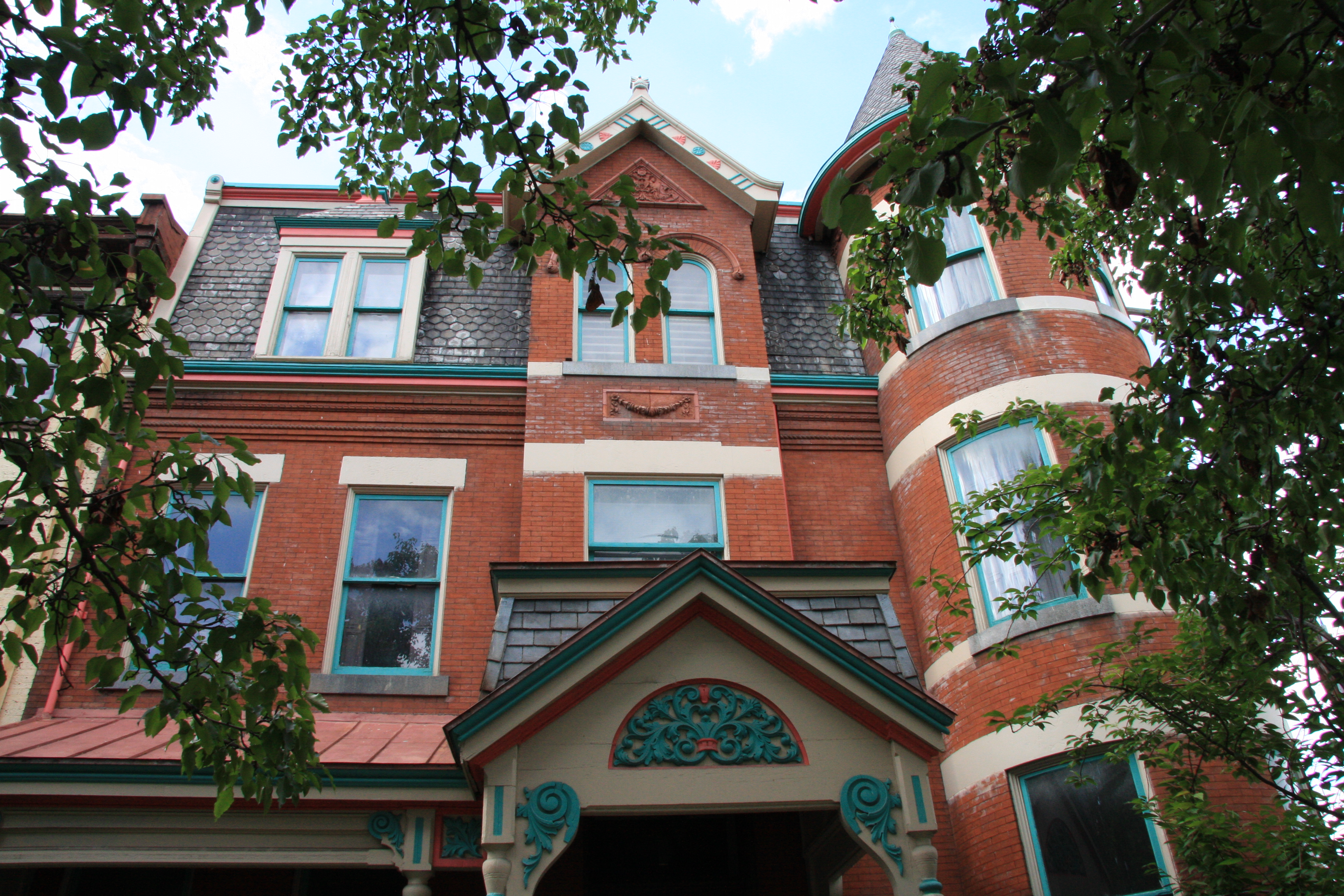
House at 200 West North Avenue, built circa 1880.

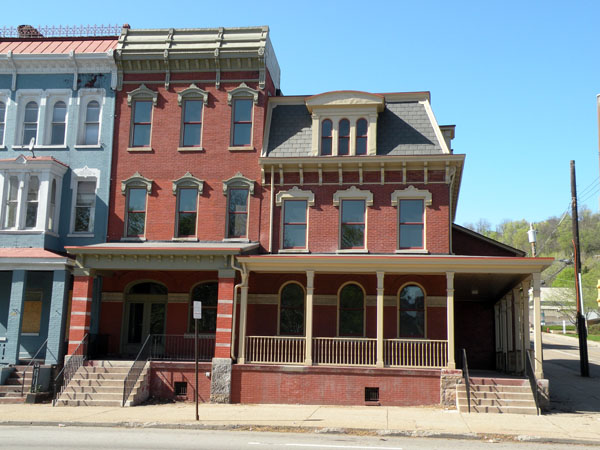
Aberlie House, likely built in the late 19th century, at 122-124 East North Avenue.

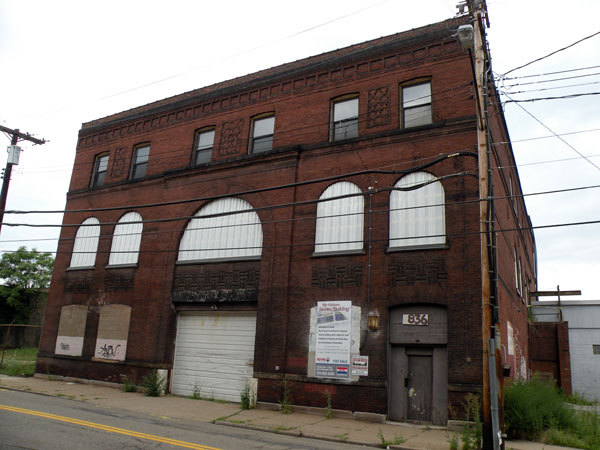
Allegheny City Stables, built in 1895 and 1896, at 836 West North Avenue.

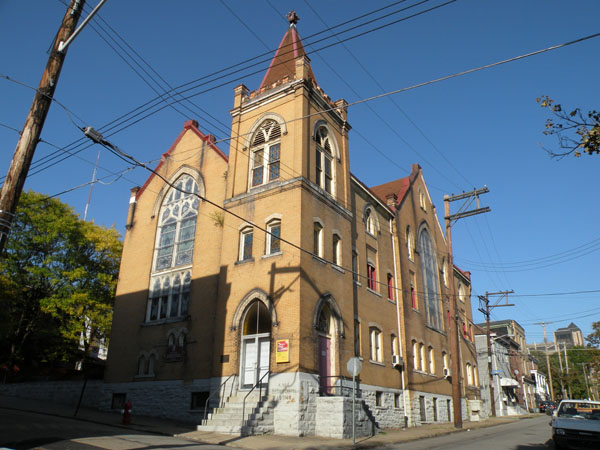
Brown Chapel A.M.E. Church, built in 1903, at 1400 Boyle Street.

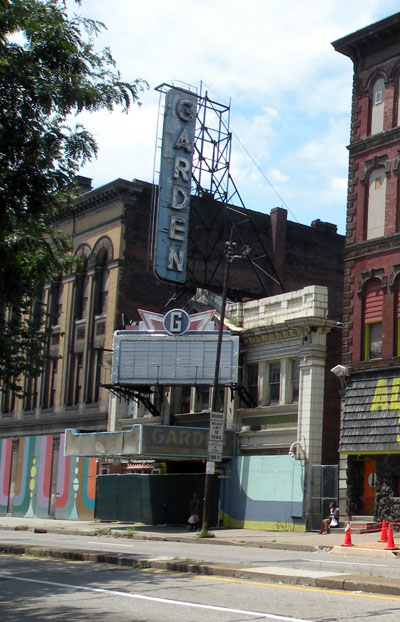
Garden Theater, built in 1915, at 12 West North Avenue.

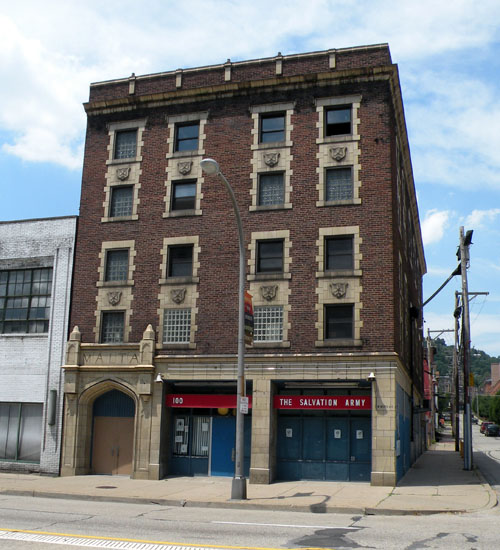
Malta Temple (Salvation Army Building), built in 1927, at 100 West North Avenue.

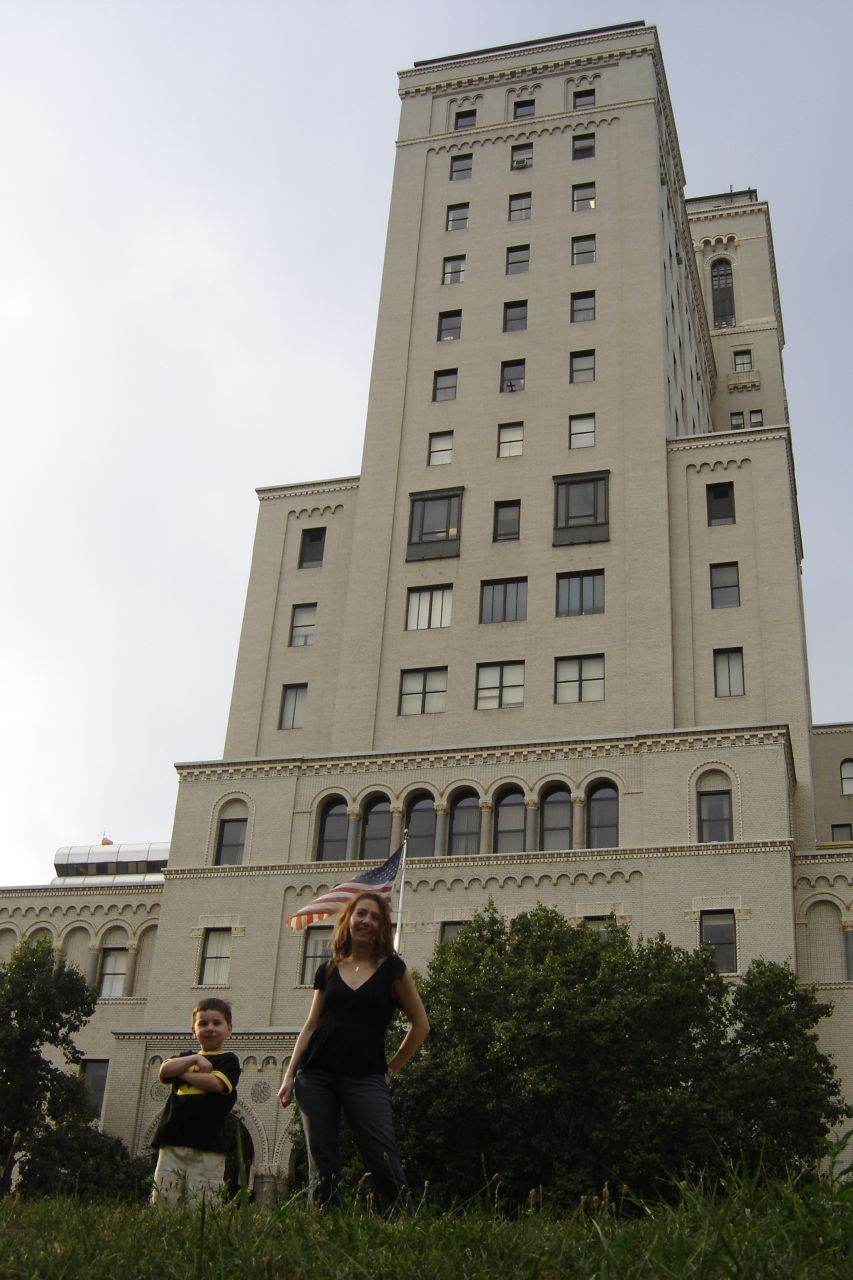
Allegheny General Hospital, built from 1928 to 1930.

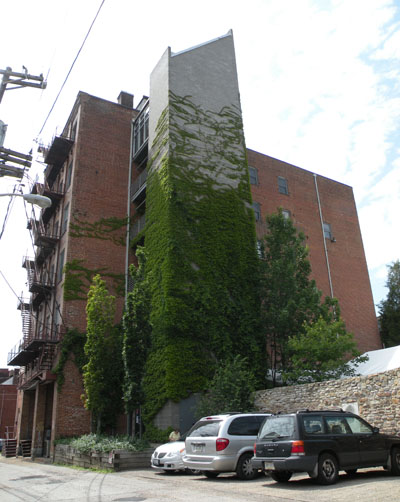
The Mattress Factory art museum at 500 Sampsonia Way.

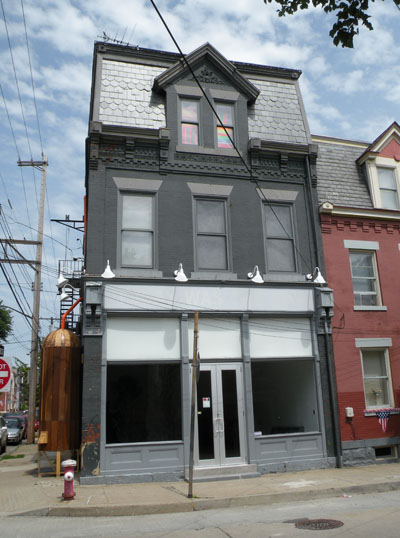
The Mattress Factory's annex gallery building at 1414 Monterey Street (at the corner of Monterey and Jacksonia streets).

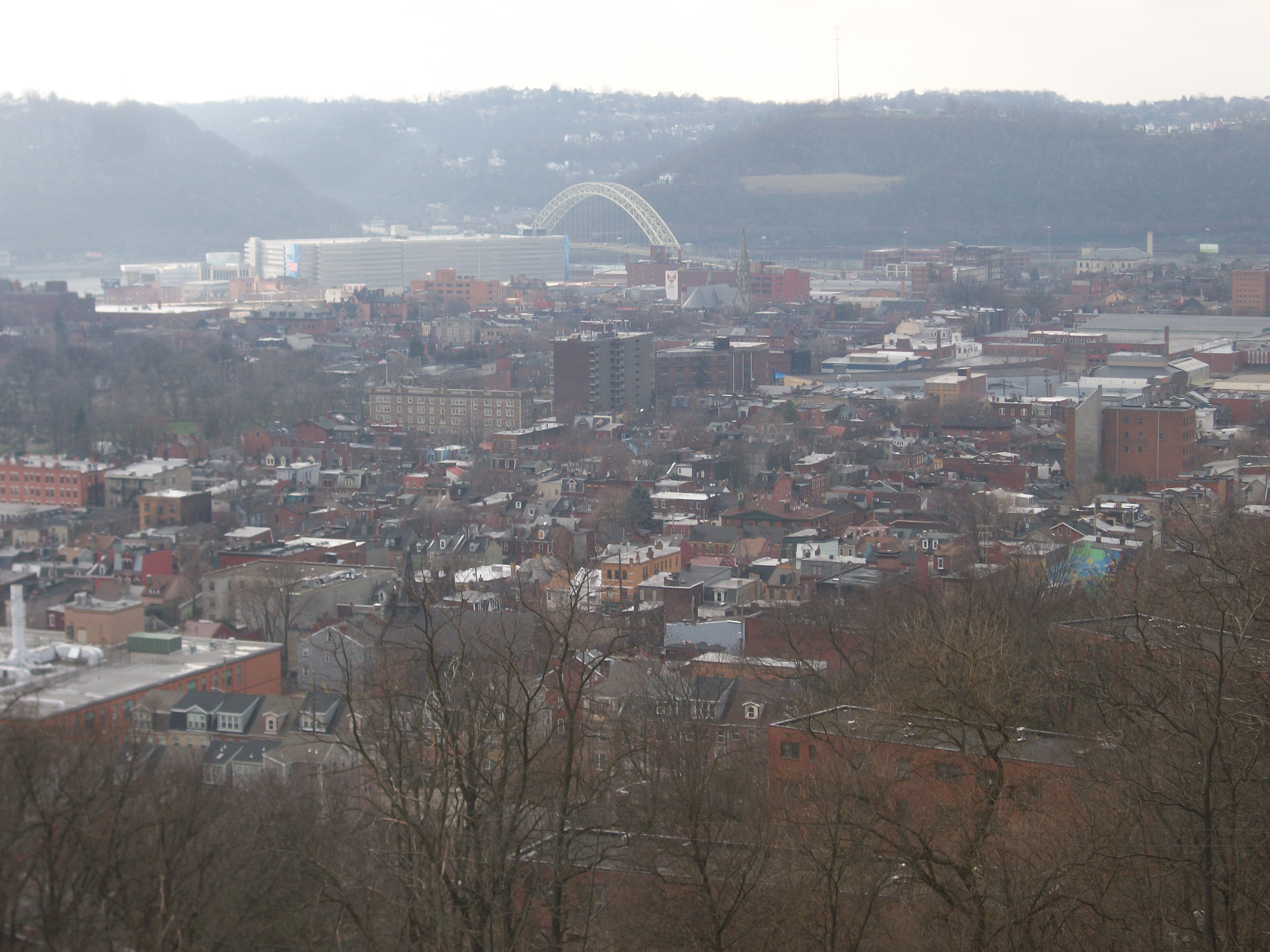
View of the neighborhood from the Fineview Overlook.

== Name ==
On 10 September 2012, the Central Northside Neighborhood Council (CNNC) voted to change the neighborhood's name to Allegheny City Central. However, according to an FAQ published by the CNNC in August 2012, the Council reported that official city maps would "probably not" reflect the name change and that the city planning department is "always very reluctant" to alter established names. The same document refers to the name change as a "branding initiative" which is part of a "new brand and marketing strategy".

== See also ==
- List of Pittsburgh neighborhoods
