= Mexican War Streets =

Historic district in Pennsylvania, United States

- Mexican War Streets Historic District
- U.S. National Register of Historic Places
- U.S. Historic district
- City of Pittsburgh Historic District
- Pittsburgh Landmark – PHLF
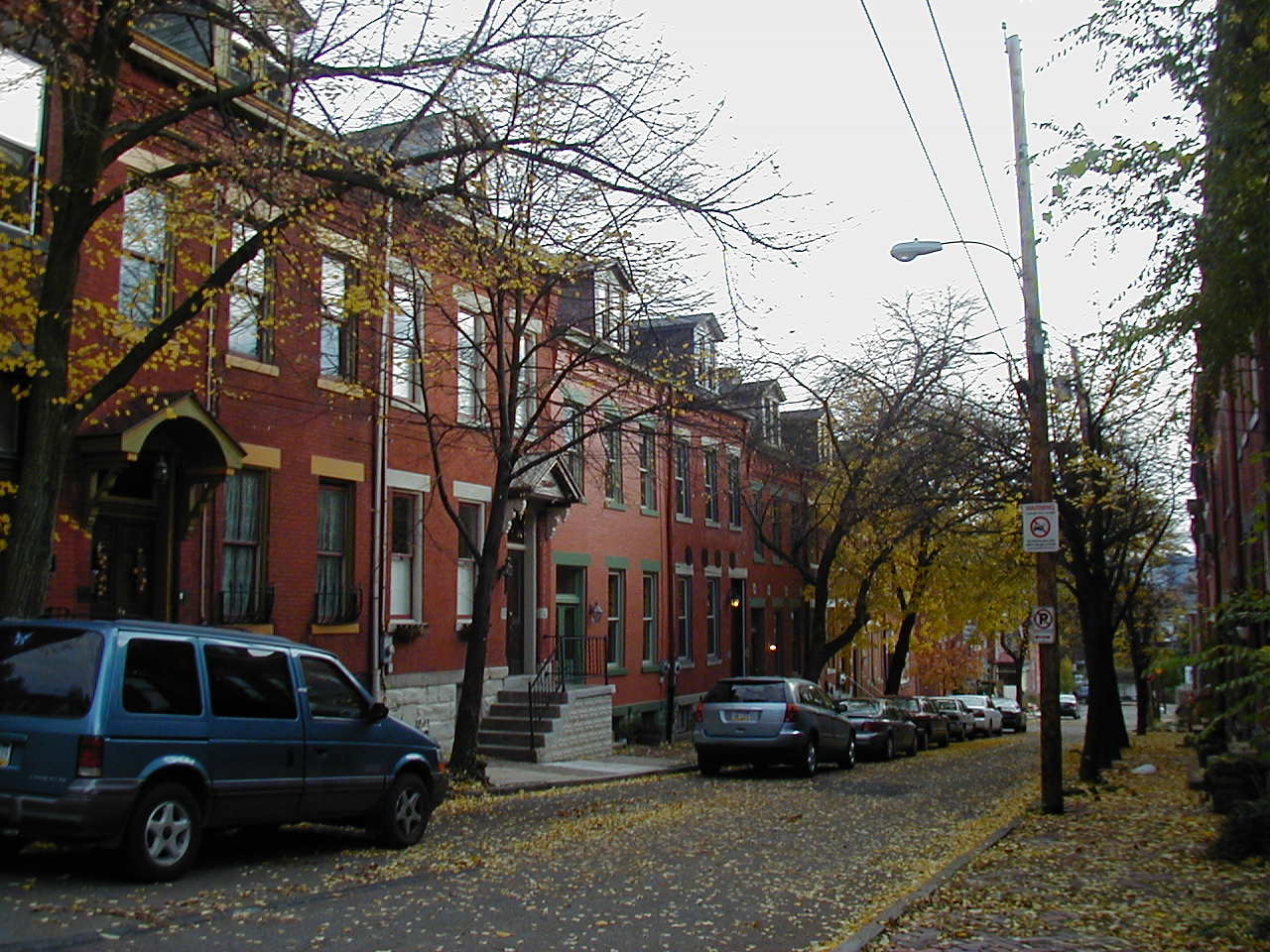

- Location within Pittsburgh Location within Pennsylvania Location within the United States
- Location: Irregular pattern between Buena Vista to the north and North Ave. to Reddour St. (increase), Pittsburgh, Pennsylvania
- Coordinates: 40°27′21.23″N 80°0′41.40″W
- Area: 27 acres (11 ha) (original); 25.7 acres (10.4 ha) (increase)
- Architectural style: Late 19th and 20th Century Revivals, Greek Revival, Late Victorian (original); Greek Revival, Italianate, Romanesque, Second Empire (increase)
- NRHP reference No.: 75001612 and 08000845

Significant dates
- Added to NRHP: May 28, 1975 (original); September 4, 2008 (increase)
- Designated CPHD: December 26, 1972
- Designated PHLF: 1976

The Mexican War Streets, originally known as the "Buena Vista Tract," is a historic district in the Central Northside neighborhood of Pittsburgh, Pennsylvania, United States. The district is densely filled with restored row houses, community gardens, and tree-lined streets and alleyways. The area dates to around the time of the Mexican–American War and a number of streets are named after battles and generals of the war.

== Brief history ==
During the late nineteenth century, Allegheny, Pennsylvania (later annexed by Pittsburgh), became known for its stately homes that were occupied by some of the area's wealthy families. One such area became known as the Mexican War Streets. It was developed from land owned by William Robinson Jr., an ex-mayor of the city of Allegheny, who subdivided the property into streets and lots in 1847. Surveys for the development were made by Alexander Hays.

A number of the streets are named after battles and generals of the Mexican–American War, including Buena Vista Street (named for the Battle of Buena Vista), Monterey Street (for the Battle of Monterrey), Palo Alto Street (for the Battle of Palo Alto), Resaca Place (for the Battle of Resaca de la Palma), Sherman Avenue (for Thomas W. Sherman), and Taylor Avenue (for Zachary Taylor). Fremont Street (currently Brighton Place) had been named in recognition of John C. Frémont.

== Historic district designation ==
The 27-acre (11 ha) district was listed on the National Register of Historic Places in 1975 with 119 buildings deemed to contribute to the historic character of the district. In 2008, the district's listing was increased to include an additional 288 contributing buildings over a 25.7-acre (10.4 ha) area. It was expanded again in 2018, when the Allegheny County Court of Common Pleas overturned the decision of the Pittsburgh City Council to deny the district's expansion.

The general boundaries of the Mexican War Streets Historic District are Brighton Road to Federal Street (on the east and west) and North Avenue to Jefferson Street (on the south and north). As part of the designation, all exterior alterations to buildings within the Historic District that are visible from a public street or way must be reviewed and approved by the City of Pittsburgh's Historic Review Commission.

== Gallery ==
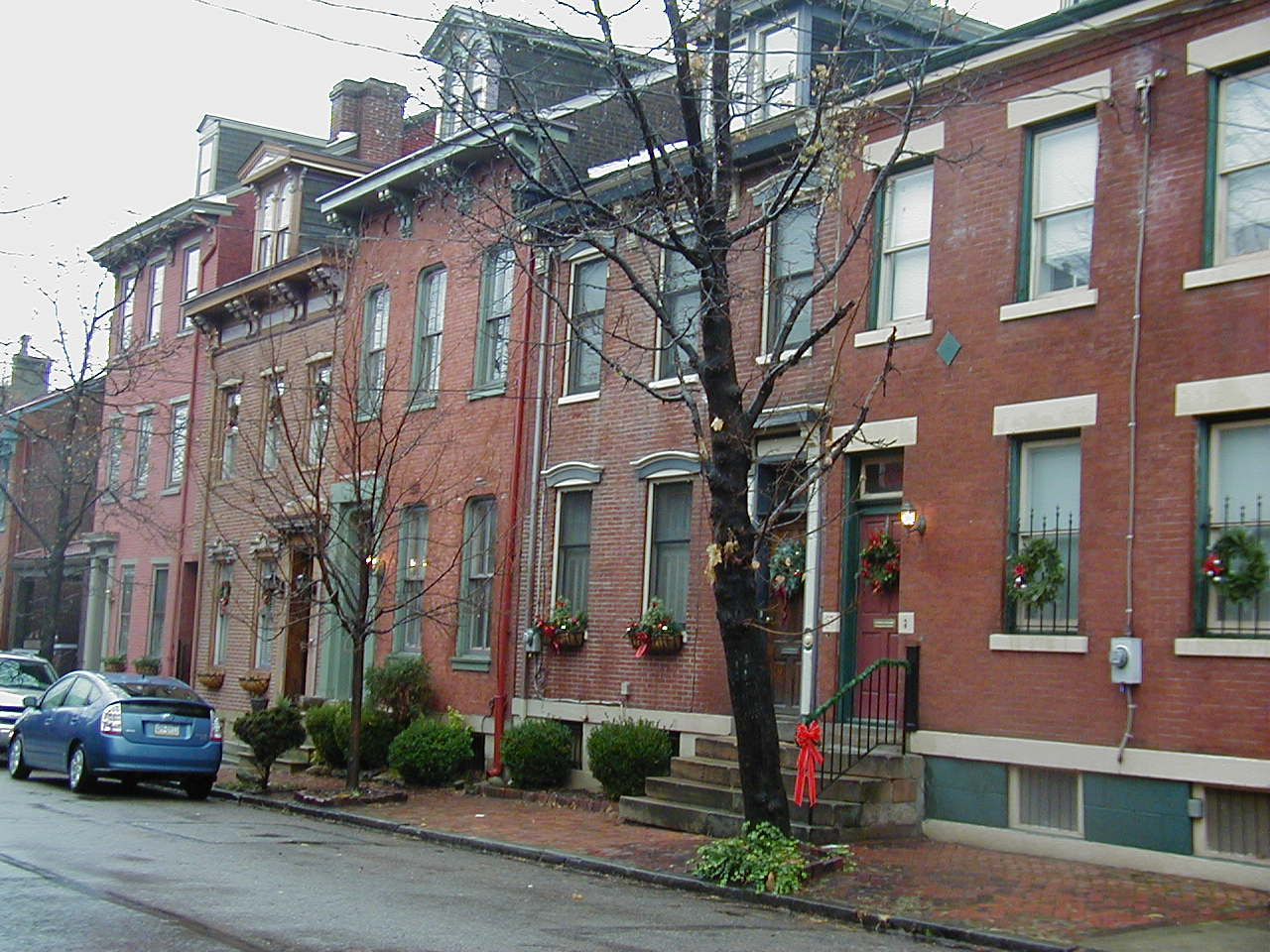
Rowhouses, Mexican War Streets

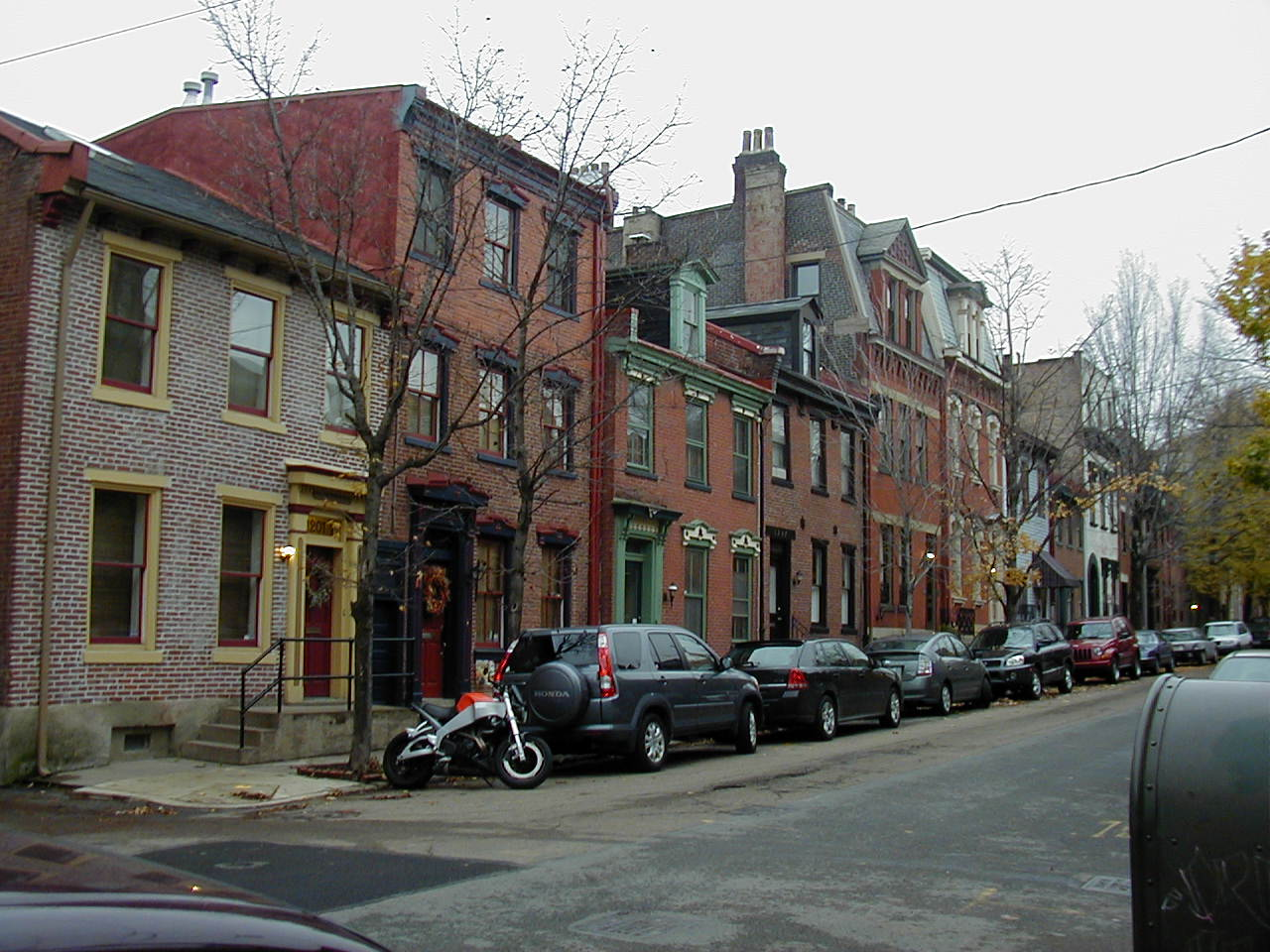
Palo Alto Street

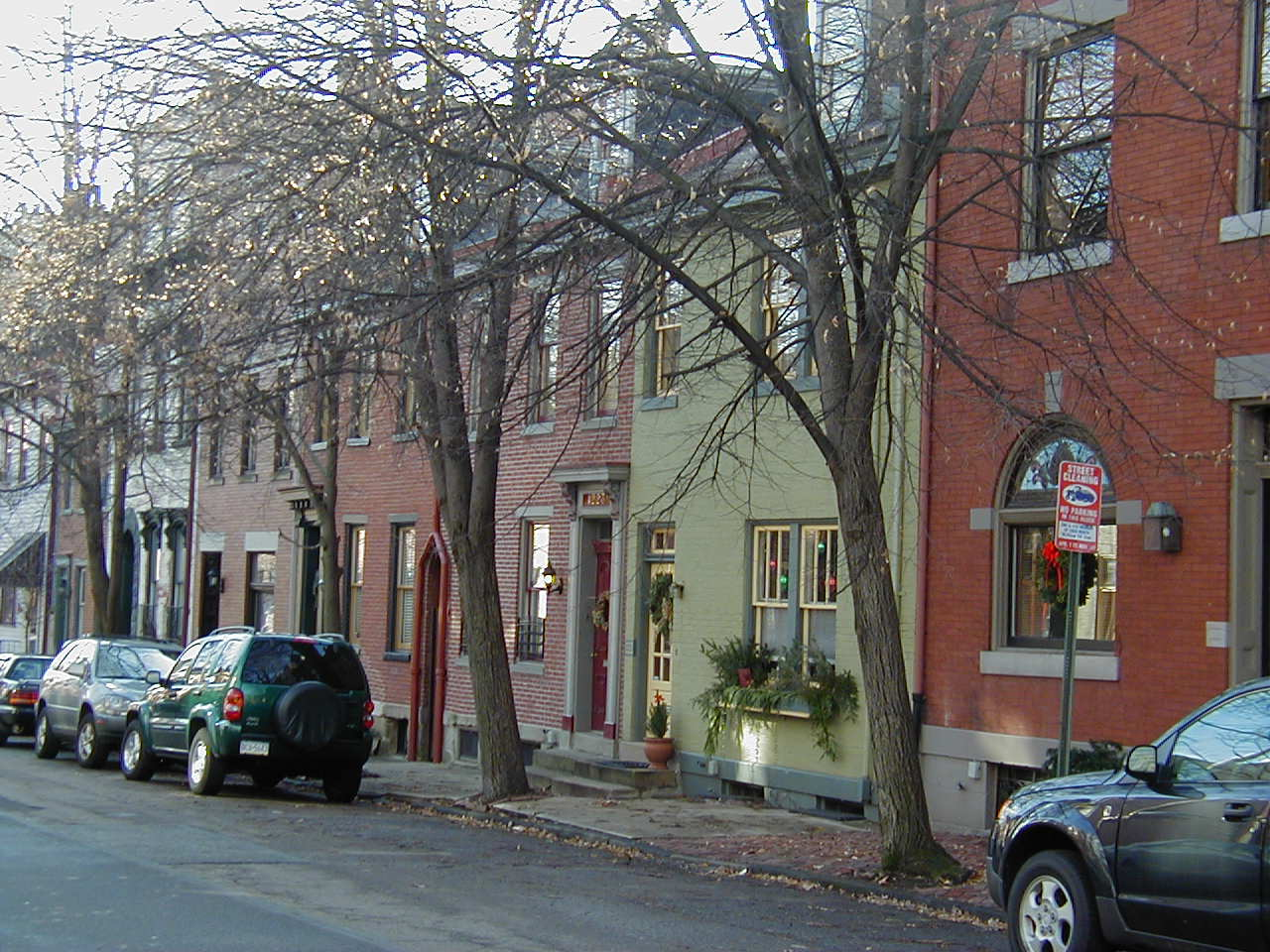
Palo Alto Street

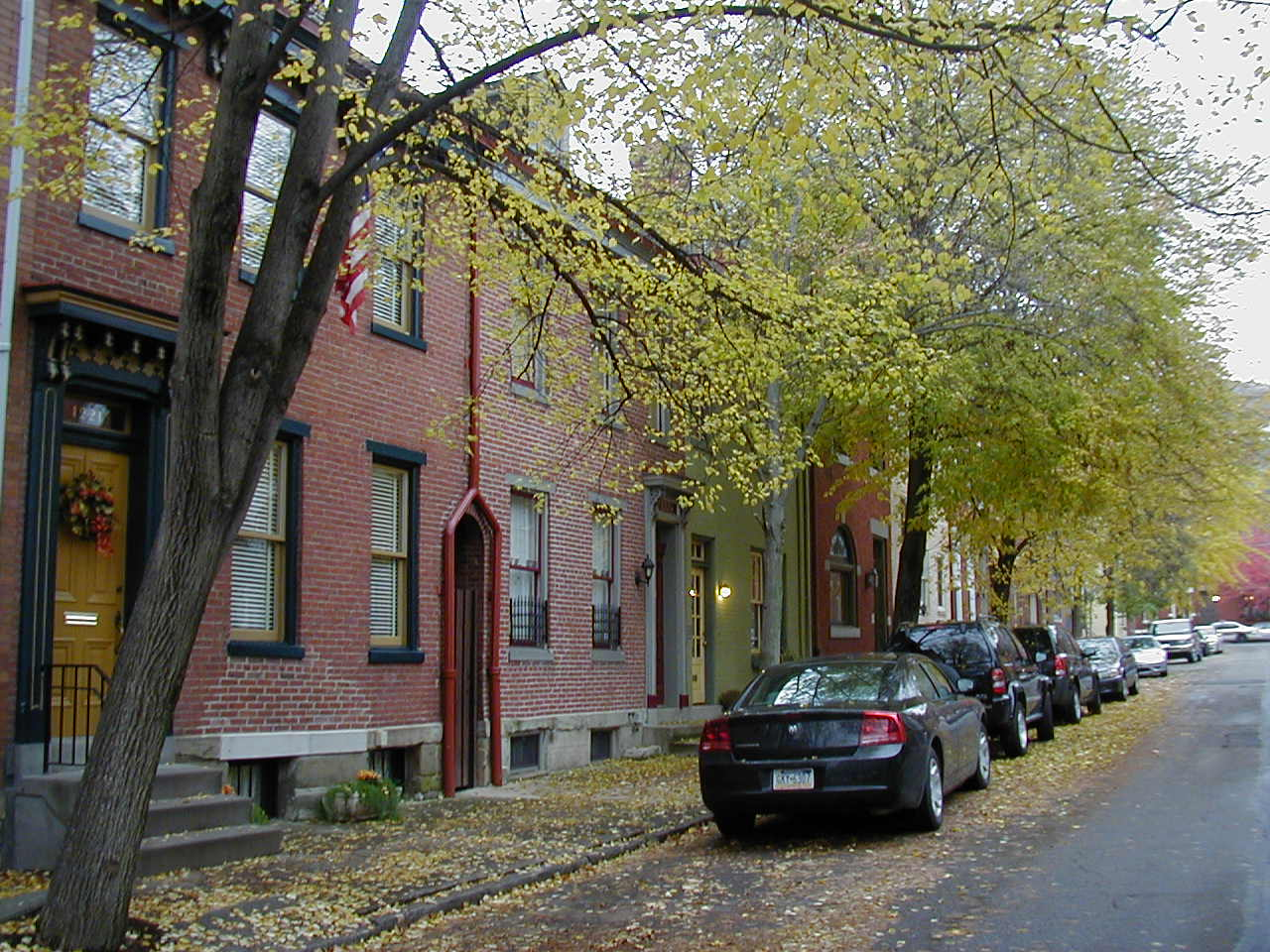
Rowhouses, Palo Alto Street

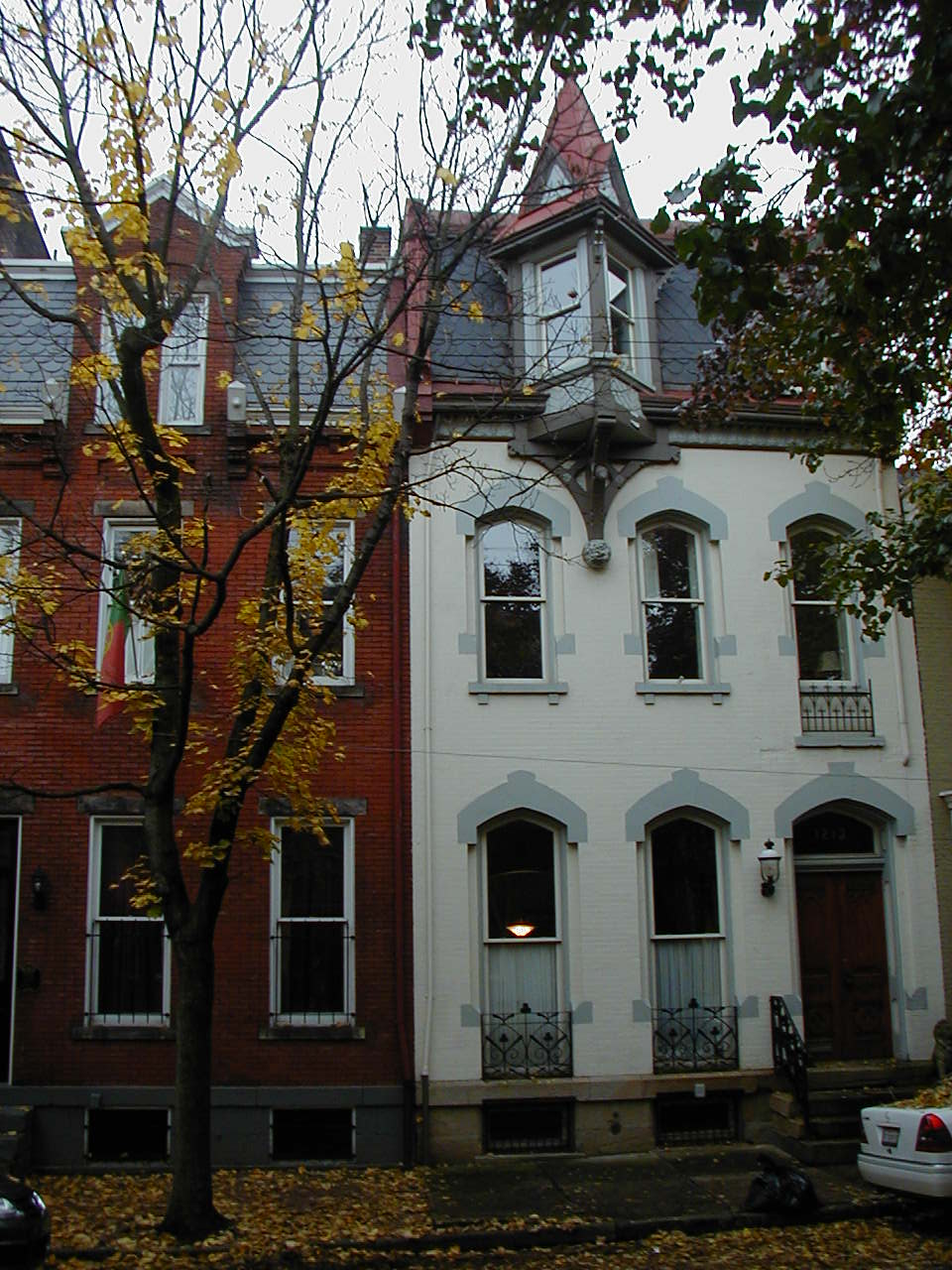
Victorian-style rowhouses

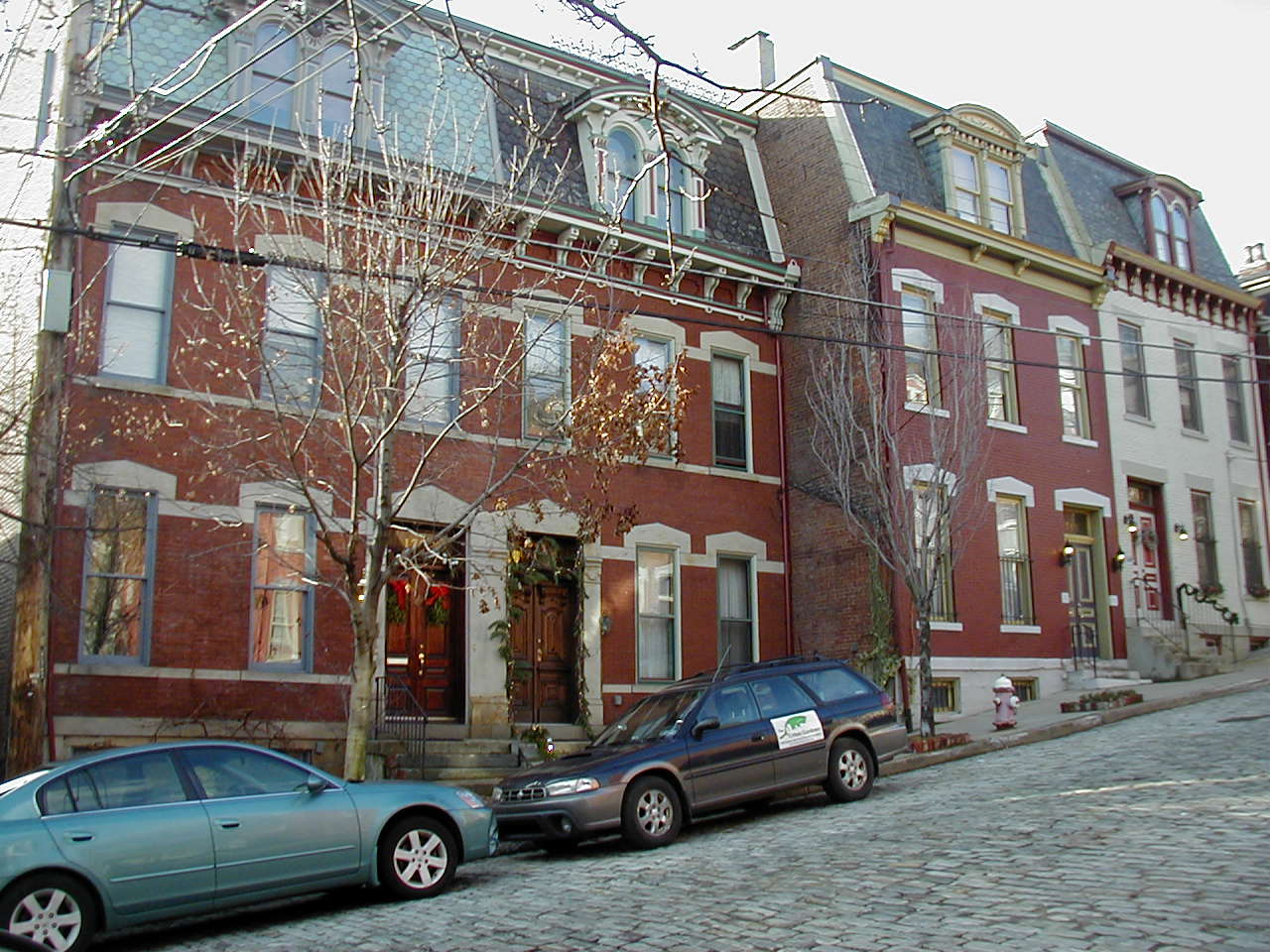
Buena Vista Street

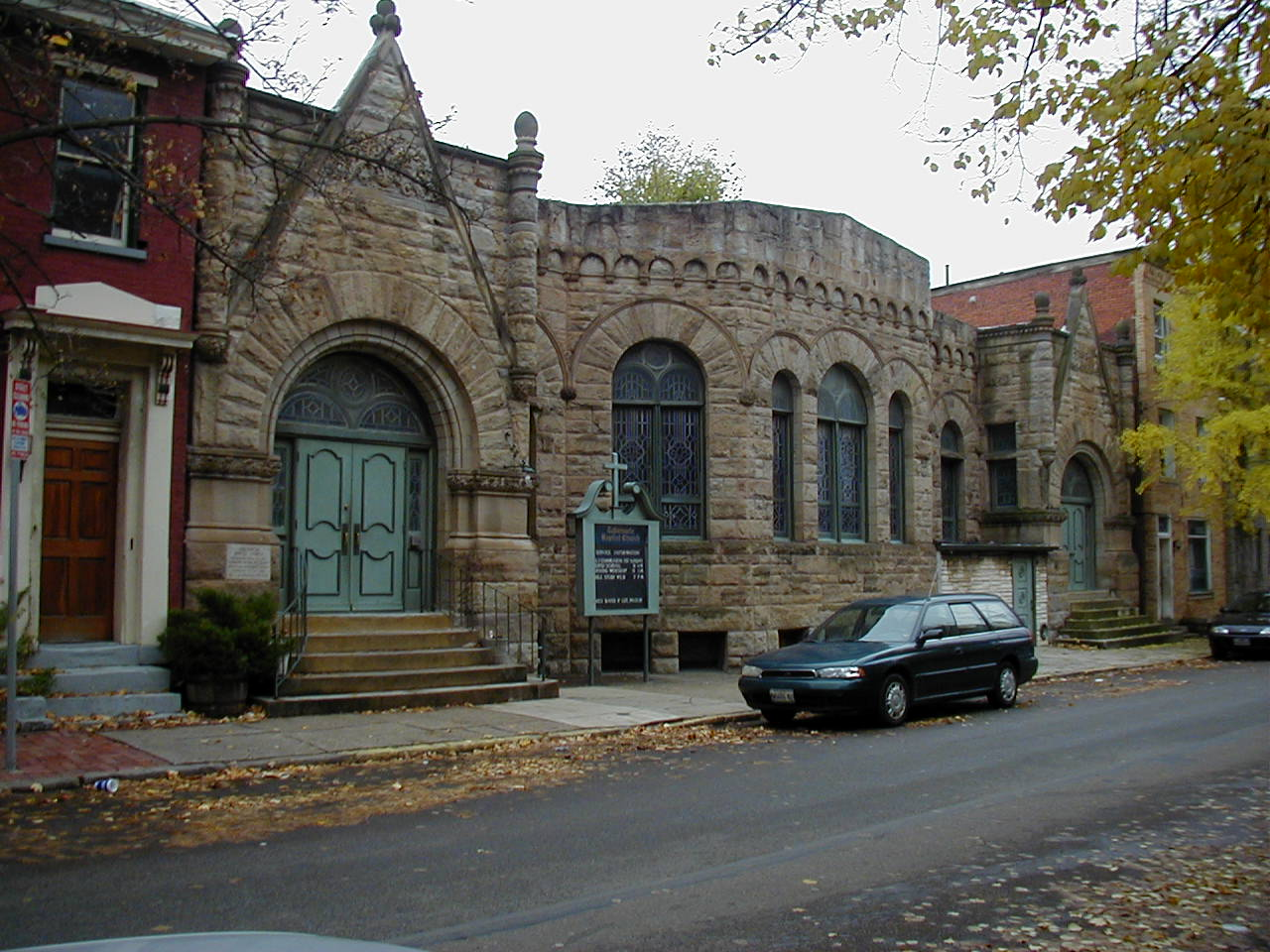
Baptist Church

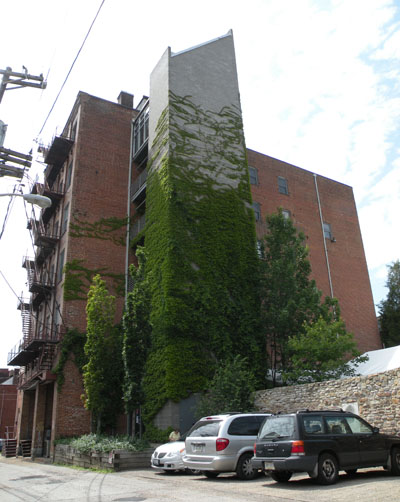
Mattress Factory art museum, 500 Sampsonia Way

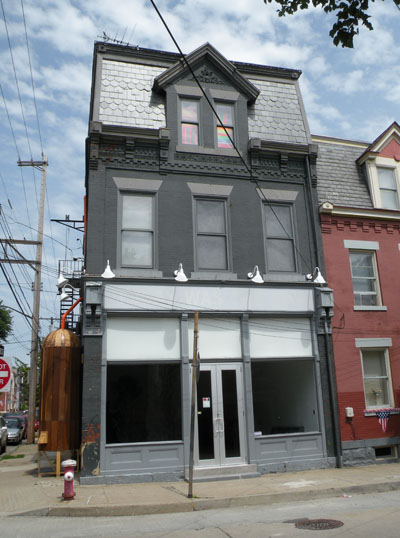
Mattress Factory annex gallery, corner of Monterey and Jacksonia streets

Resaca Place (street, center of photo)
