= Frederick C. Sauer =

American architect

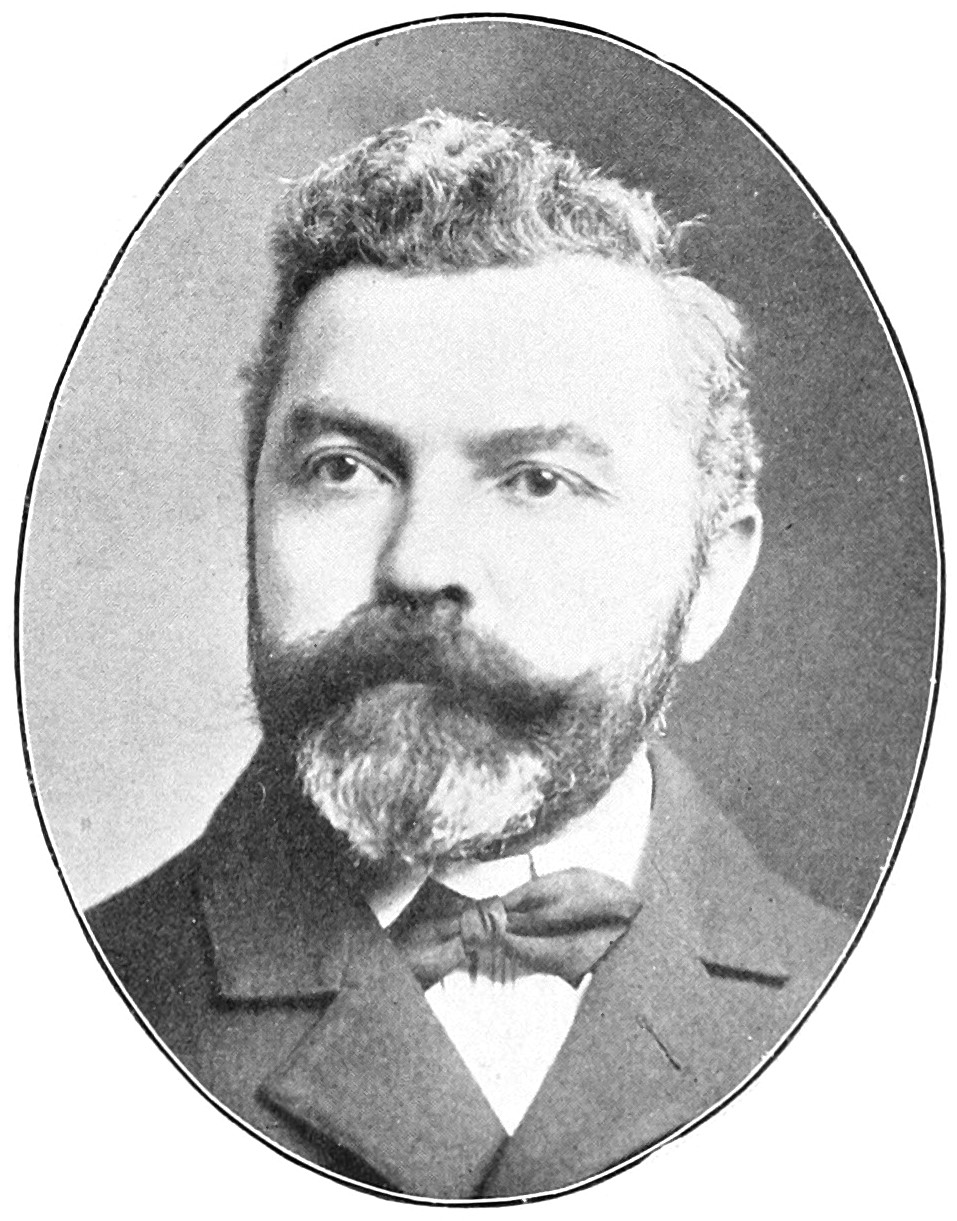
Photograph of architect Frederick C. Sauer published in 1901

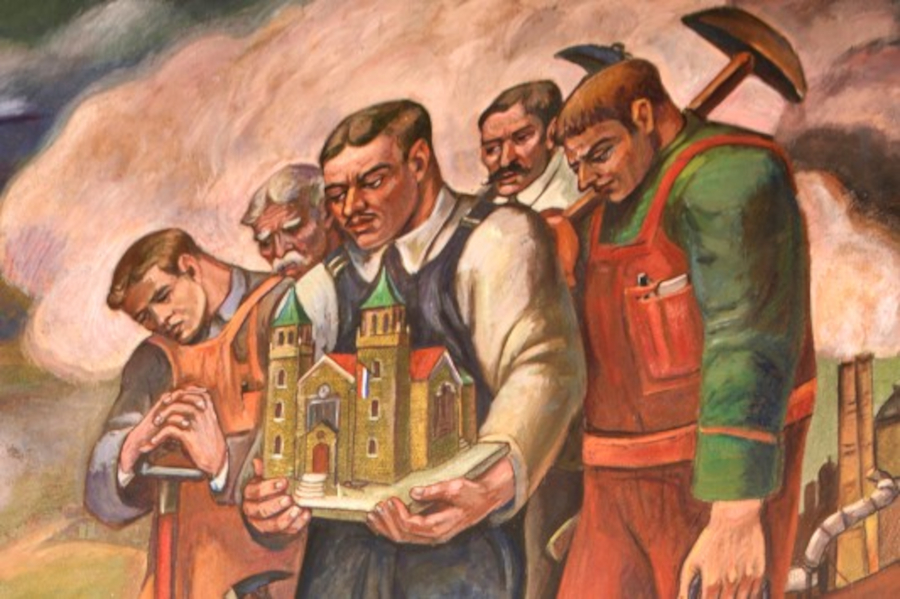
Frederick C. Sauer (1860 – 1942) architect likely depicted holding church model on church mural by Maksimilijan "Maxo" Vanka (1937) in St. Nicholas Croatian Church, Millvale, Pennsylvania.

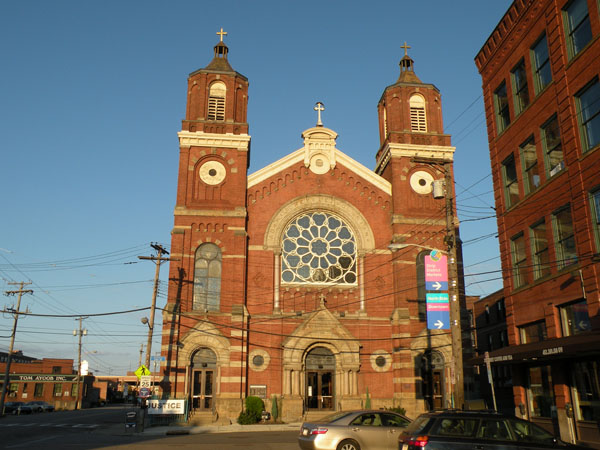
St. Stanislaus Kostka Church, built 1891, in the Strip District of Pittsburgh, Pennsylvania.

Frederick C. Sauer (1860, Heidelberg, Grand Duchy of Baden – 1942, Aspinwall, Pennsylvania, United States) was a German-American architect, particularly in the Pittsburgh, Pennsylvania, region of the late 19th and early 20th centuries.

Sauer, a German-born immigrant to the United States, was a stonemason, bricklayer and carpenter while studying at Technical school in Wittenberg, before studying at Stuttgart. He moved to Pittsburgh from Germany in 1880, established a Pittsburgh office in 1884, established the Aspinwall-Delafield Land Company in 1904, and built about a dozen Catholic churches in the area. Perhaps his most notable works are St. Stanislaus Kostka Church (1891) in the Strip District of Pittsburgh, St. Mary of the Mount Church (1896) on Mount Washington in Pittsburgh, Saint Mary Magdalene Church in Homestead (1895), Latimer School (1898) in East Allegheny on the North Side of Pittsburgh, the old St. Nicholas Croatian Catholic Church (1900) in Troy Hill, and the St. Nicholas Croatian Church in Millvale (1922). In 1898, Sauer built a home for himself in Aspinwall, Pennsylvania. After remodeling his chicken coop in an eccentric mode in 1928 and 1930, he gradually transformed a wooded hillside into an architectural fantasy, and a complex of castlesque buildings and landscape features in Fantastic architectural style gradually took shape and was progressively added to by Sauer until his death in 1942. The site is listed on the National Register of Historic Places as an historic district entitled the Sauer Buildings Historic District. "It is the most bizarre collection of buildings in Western Pennsylvania," says Franklin Toker, professor of art and architecture at the University of Pittsburgh.

== List of known buildings designed by Sauer in chronological order ==
Italics denote a building listed on the National Register of Historic Places:

- The Rectory of St. Michael's Roman Catholic Church (1890) at 21 Pius Street in the South Side Slopes neighborhood of Pittsburgh, Pennsylvania
- St. Stanislaus Kostka Church (1891) at 21st and Smallman Streets in the Strip District of Pittsburgh, PA
- Hitzrot House (1892) at 626 Market Street in McKeesport, Pennsylvania (Former house of Dr. Henry W. Hitzrot, who died in 1906, then the Fraternal Order of Eagles bought the building in 1911). Hitzrot House was demolished in 2014 by the City of McKeesport
- St. Mary Magdalene Church (1895) at 1008 Amity Street in Homestead, Pennsylvania
- Church of the Immaculate Conception (1896) at 148 E. Crawford Avenue in Connellsville, Pennsylvania
- St. Mary of the Mount Church (1896) at 403 Grandview Avenue in the Mount Washington neighborhood of Pittsburgh, PA
- Latimer School (1898) at Tripoli and James Streets in East Allegheny on the North Side of Pittsburgh, PA
- Sauer House (1898) at 625 Center Avenue in Aspinwall, Pennsylvania (Sauer's home and the first dwelling built on what would later become the Sauer Buildings Historic District, a collection of buildings he designed, built, and worked on for the rest of his life)
- St. Nicholas Croatian Church (1900) at 1326 East Ohio Street in the Troy Hill neighborhood of Pittsburgh, PA
- St. Colman's Roman Catholic Church (1901 to 1903) at 128 Shaw Avenue in Turtle Creek, Pennsylvania (Torn down, now a parking lot. New church called St. Colman's at Hunter and Thompson Streets.)
- Sauer House - (1910) at 311 Highland Terr. O'hara, Pennsylvania - Sauer's home for a few years before selling in 1920.
- St. Nicholas Croatian Church (1922) at 24 Maryland Avenue in Millvale, Pennsylvania
- Heidelberg (1928–1930) three-story apartment house in fantastic architectural style. Considered by some critics to be the main structure of the Sauer Buildings Historic District in Aspinwall, Pennsylvania, and perhaps the catalyst for Sauer's experiments in architectural fantasy. Sauer continued to work on the buildings in this district until his death in 1942.
- 804 Penn Ave

== Gallery ==
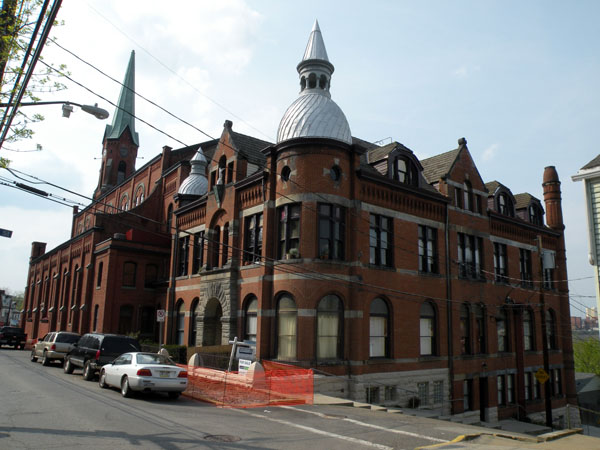
Former Saint Michael's Roman Catholic Church Rectory, built 1890, at 21 Pius Street in the South Side Slopes neighborhood of Pittsburgh, Pennsylvania.

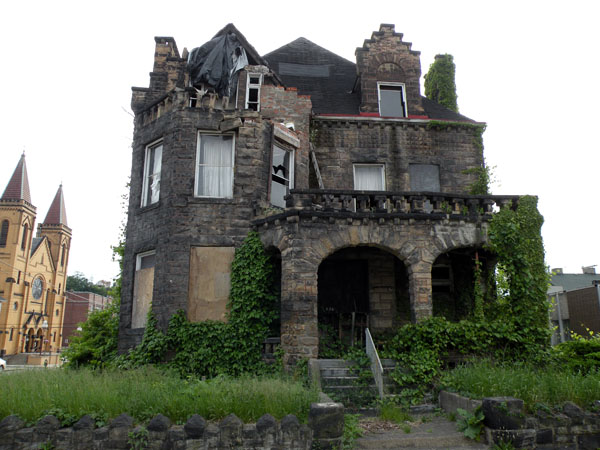
Hitzrot House, built 1892, at 626 Market Street in McKeesport, Pennsylvania.

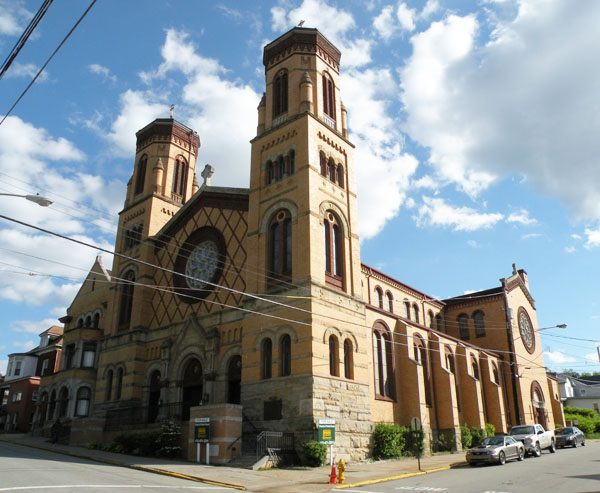
St. Mary Magdalene Church, built 1895, at 1008 Amity Street in Homestead, Pennsylvania.

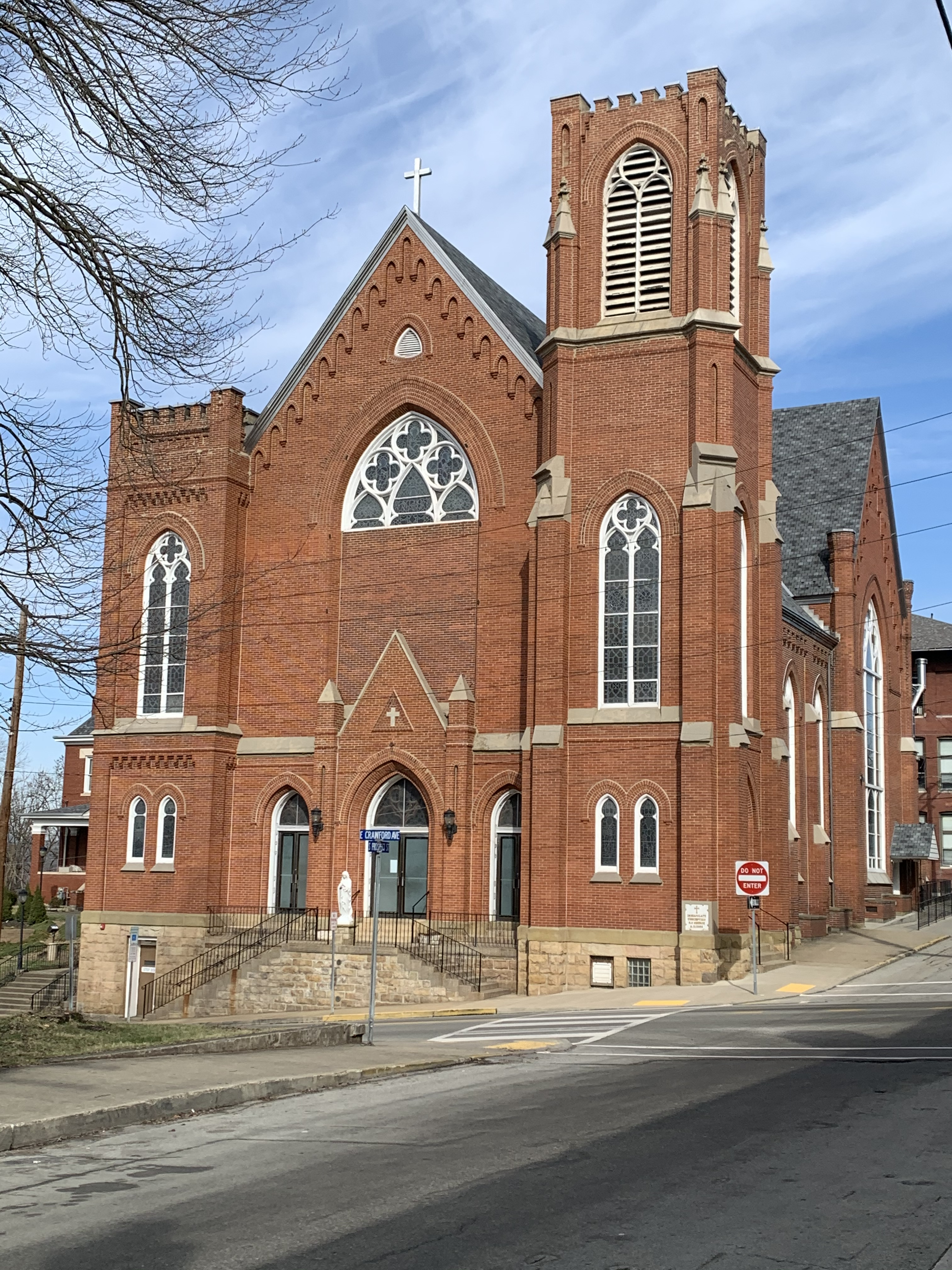
Church of the Immaculate Conception, built 1896, in Connellsville, Pennsylvania

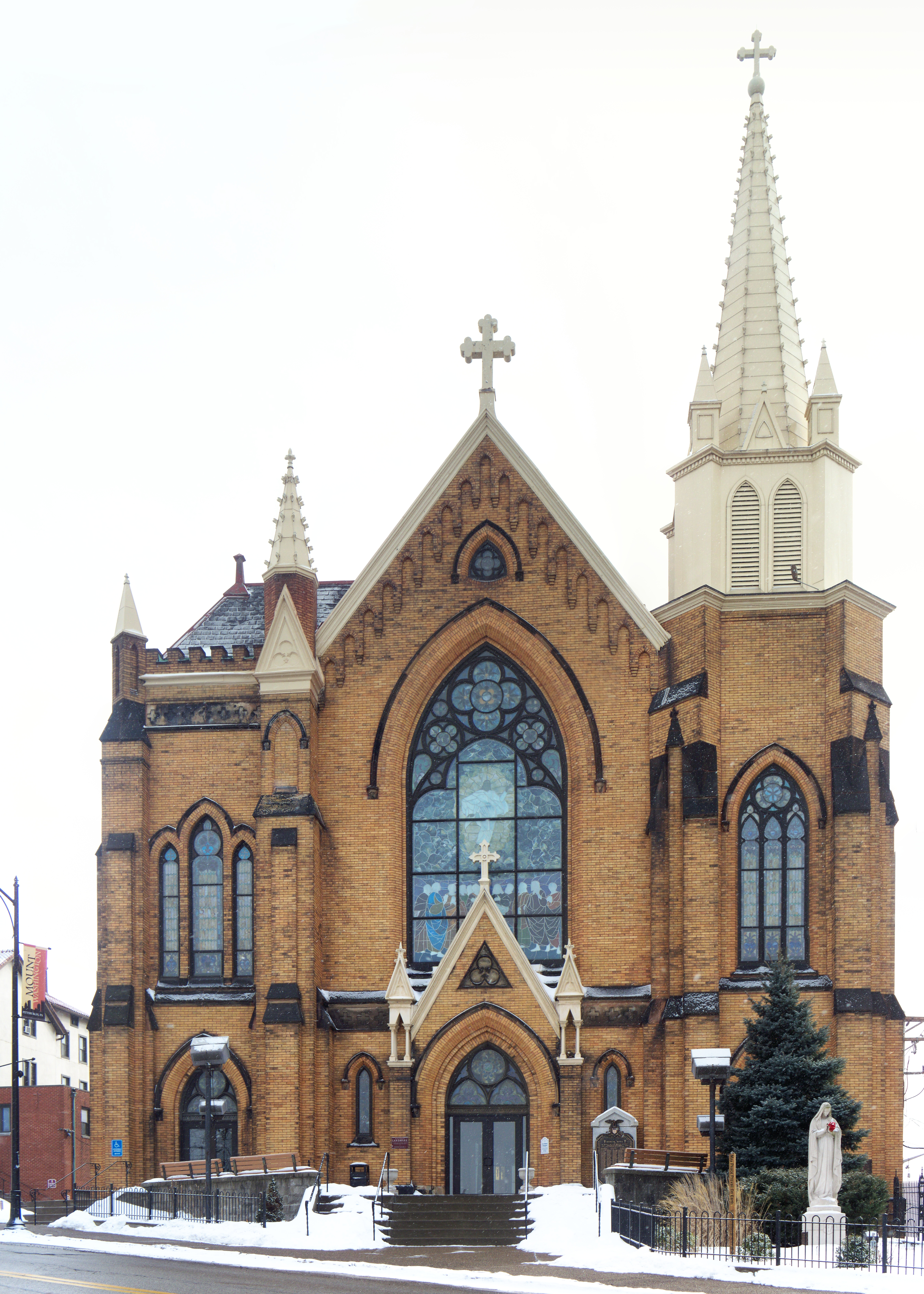
St. Mary of the Mount Church, built in 1896, at 403 Grandview Avenue in the Mount Washington neighborhood of Pittsburgh, PA.

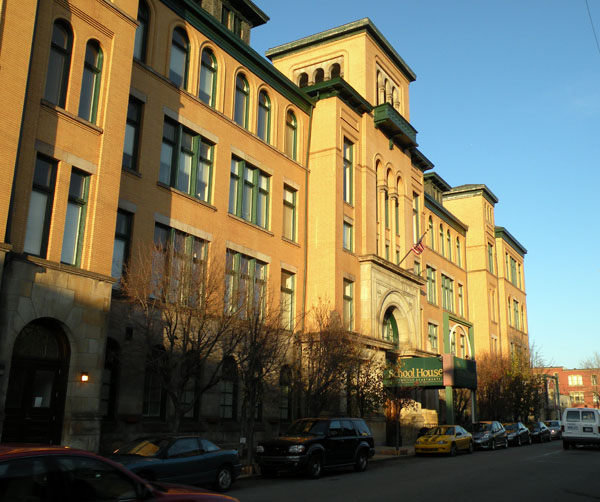
Latimer School, built 1898, located at Tripoli and James Streets in the East Allegheny neighborhood of Pittsburgh, PA.

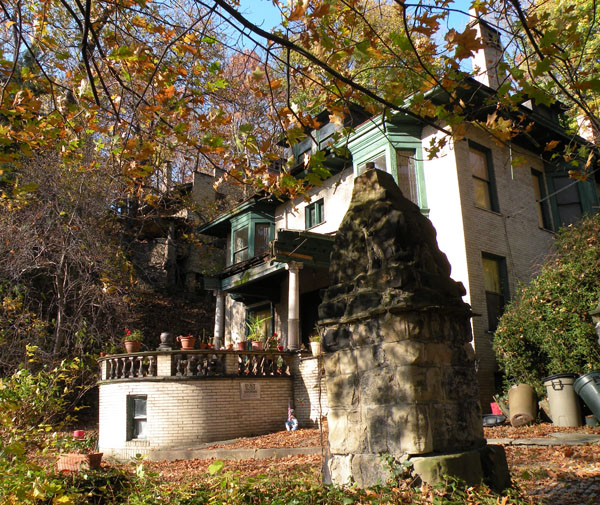
Sauer House, built in 1898, at 625 Center Avenue in Aspinwall, Pennsylvania.

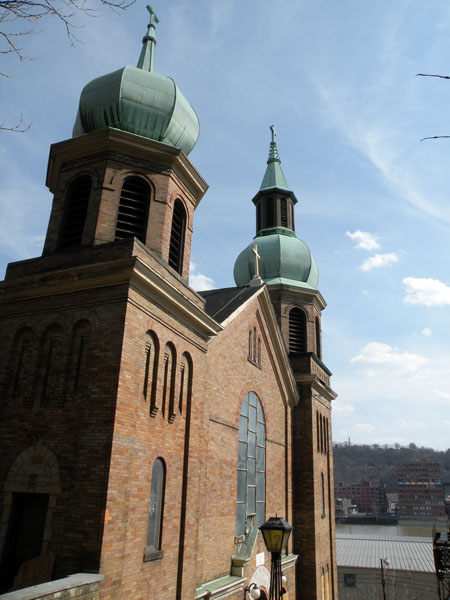
The old Saint Nicholas Croatian Catholic Church, built from 1900 to 1904, at 1326 East Ohio Street in the Troy Hill neighborhood of Pittsburgh, PA.

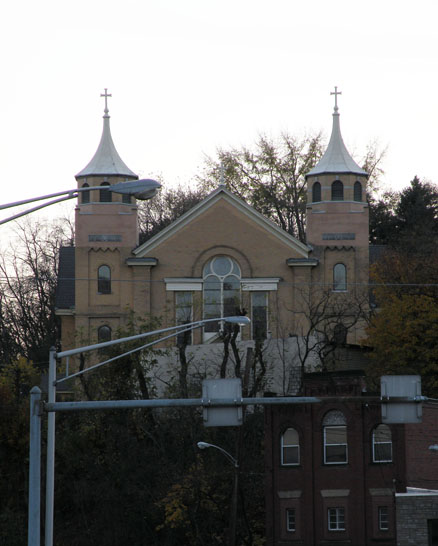
St. Nicholas Croatian Church, built in 1922, at 24 Maryland Avenue in Millvale, Pennsylvania.

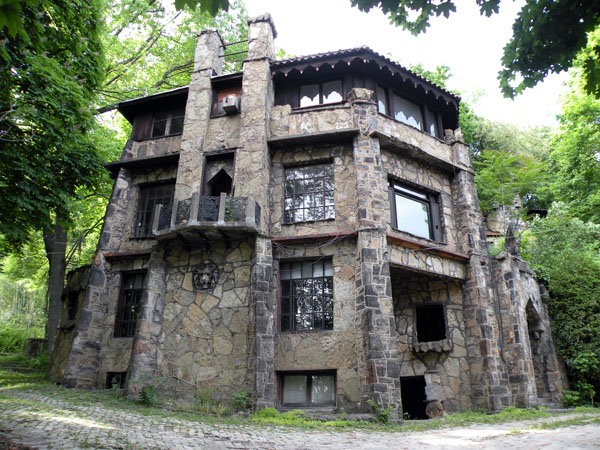
Sauer's "Heidelberg" apartment house, built 1928–1930, part of the Sauer Buildings Historic District in Aspinwall, Pennsylvania.

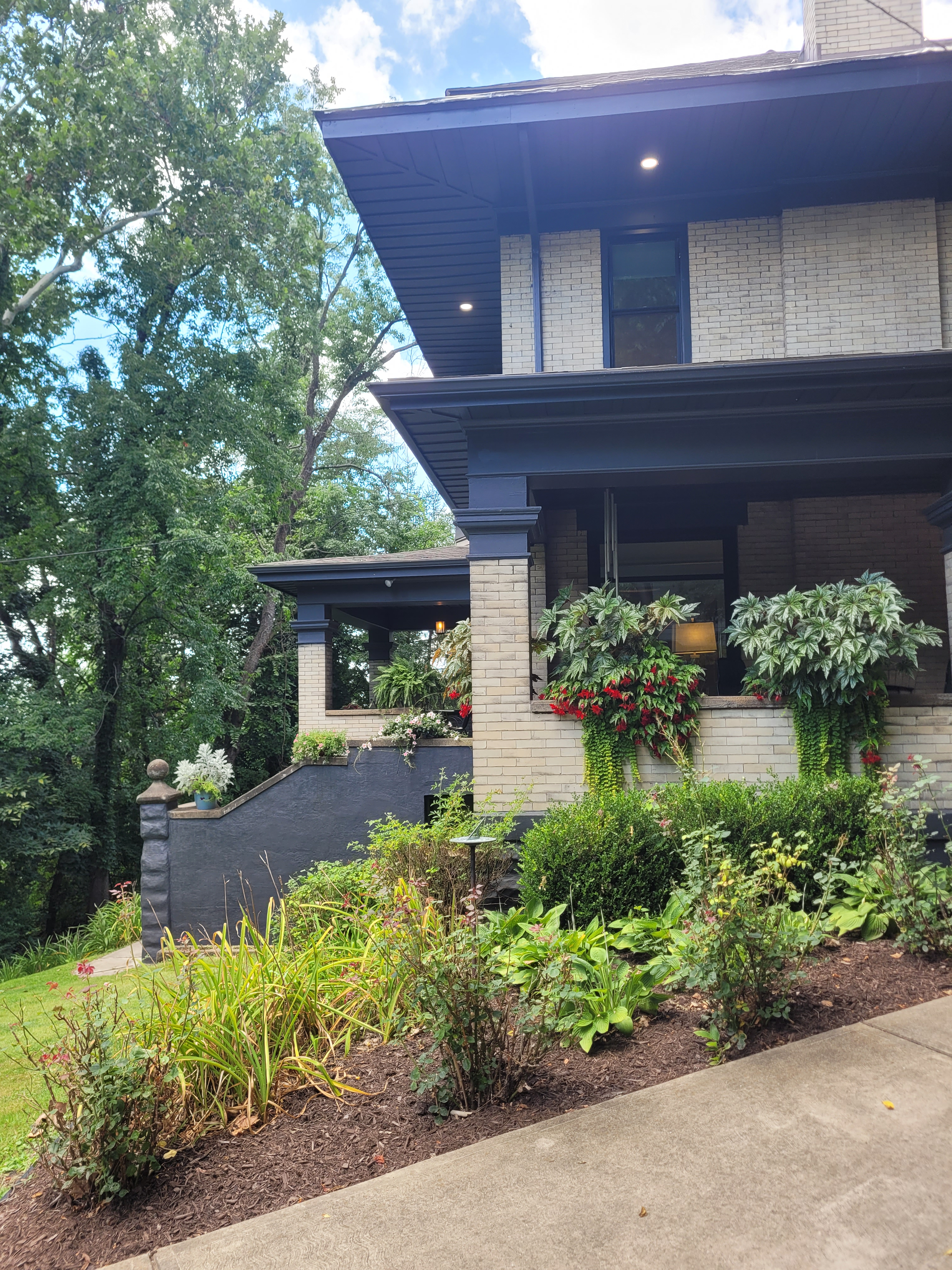
