= Fantastic architecture =

Architectural style

Fantastic architecture is an architectural style featuring attention-grabbing buildings. Such buildings can be considered as works of art, and are normally built purely for the amusement of its owner. Architects that employed this style include Antoni Gaudí, Bruno Taut, and Hans Poelzig.

Fantastic architecture should not be confused with novelty architecture. While both styles have unusual, attention-grabbing designs, novelty architecture is meant to be an advertisement for the business inside, such as buildings with a giant donut on the roof. Fantastic architecture, on the other hand, serves no other purpose than the personal amusement of its builder.

== Selected fantastic-style structures ==
- Martin Castle in Versailles, Kentucky
- Sauer Buildings Historic District by Frederick C. Sauer, Aspinwall, Pennsylvania
- Watts Towers by Simon Rodia, Watts district of Los Angeles, California
- Wadham's Oil and Grease Company of Milwaukee
