= Latimer School =

- U.S. National Register of Historic Places
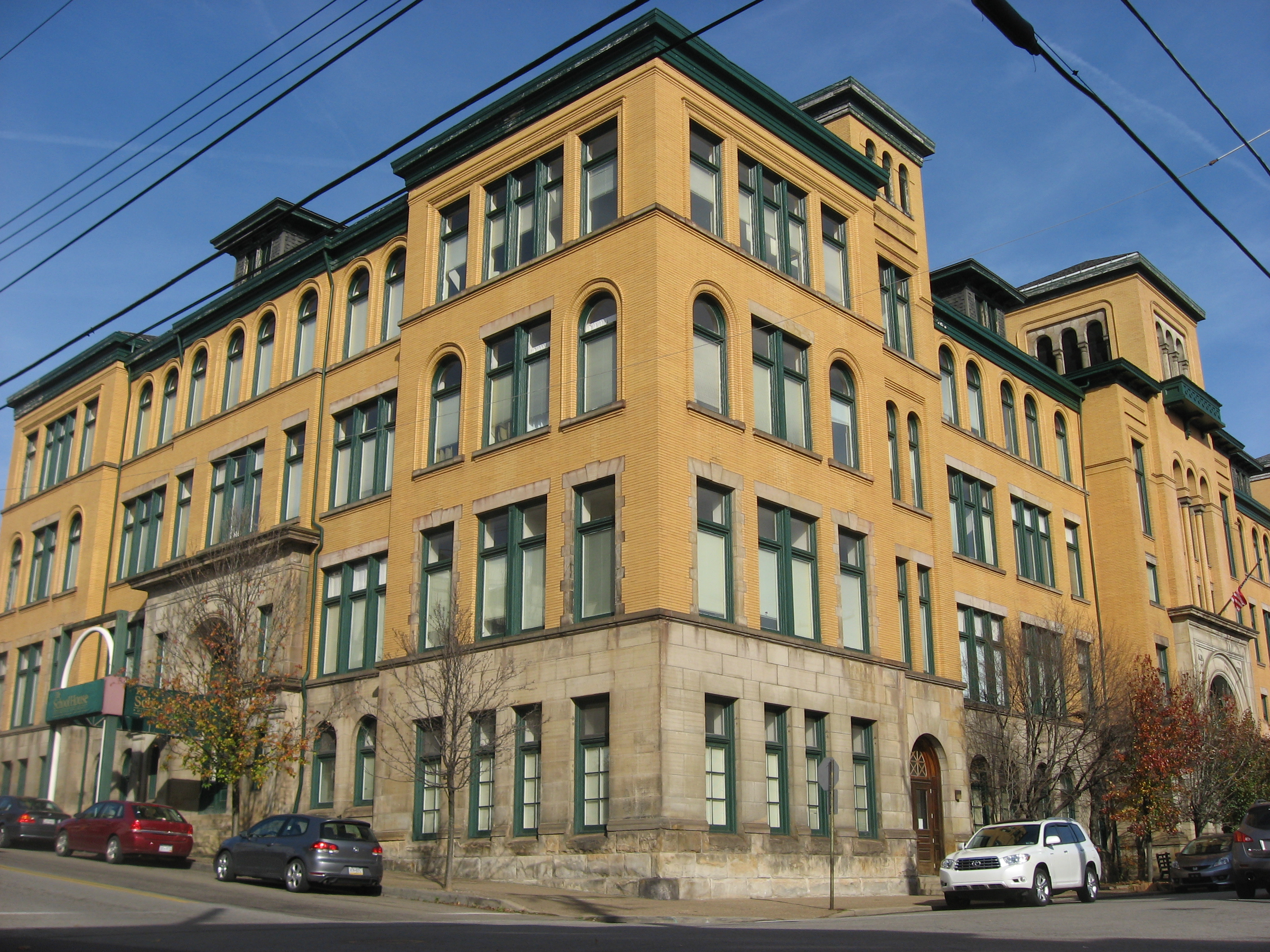
- Southwestern corner of the school

- Location within Pittsburgh Location within Pennsylvania Location within the United States
- Location: Tripoli and James Sts., Pittsburgh, Pennsylvania
- Coordinates: 40°27′23″N 80°00′03″W
- Area: 4 acres (1.6 ha)
- Built: 1898
- Architect: Frederick C. Sauer
- Architectural style: Classical Revival
- NRHP reference No.: 86002676
- Added to NRHP: September 30, 1986

The Latimer School (also known as "The School House Apartments") is located in the East Allegheny neighborhood of Pittsburgh, Pennsylvania. The school building was listed on the National Register of Historic Places in 1986. The school closed in 1982 and was purchased for conversion into apartments in 1984.

== History and Architectural Features ==
Built in 1898, this historic structure is a four-story, yellow brick building with a variety of window types and placement. It was designed by the German-born Pittsburgh architect Frederick C. Sauer (1860-1942).

The school building was listed on the National Register of Historic Places in 1986.
