= Church of the Immaculate Conception (Connellsville, Pennsylvania) =

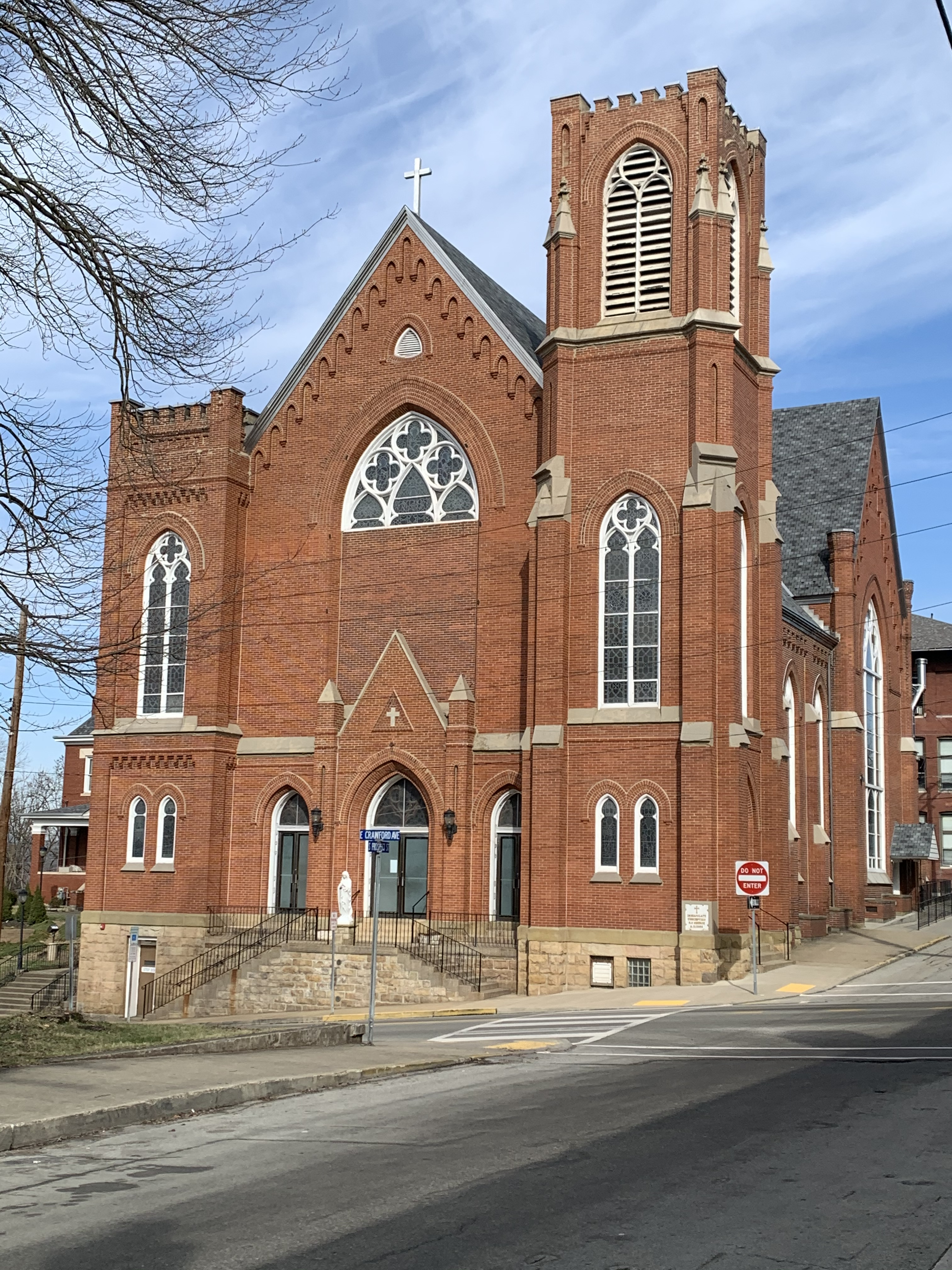
- Front view of the church in February 2020
- Location: 148 E. Crawford Ave., Connellsville, Pennsylvania
- Denomination: Roman Catholic

History
- Status: Parish Church
- Dedication: Immaculate Conception

Architecture
- Architect: Frederick C. Sauer
- Style: Gothic
- Years built: 1896

Specifications
- Length: 129 feet
- Width: 65 feet

Administration
- Diocese: Roman Catholic Diocese of Greensburg

The Church of the Immaculate Conception is a Catholic parish church in Connellsville, Pennsylvania in the Diocese of Greensburg. It was designed by Frederick C. Sauer, a well-known German-American architect in the Pittsburgh, Pennsylvania region in the late 19th and early 20th centuries. The cornerstone of the church was laid in September 1896. Immaculate Conception High School (now called Geibel Catholic High School) operated as the parish's school until 1967 when it became a regional parochial school.

== History ==
Several buildings had been home to the Immaculate Conception parish since its establishment. The increasing number of Catholics in the town necessitated the construction of a larger church which was later destroyed by fire on January 22, 1892. The congregation was eager for a new church which was then designed by Frederick C. Sauer, an architect well known for his churches in the Pittsburgh region. Father John T. Burns was assigned to the church in 1896 to oversee construction. After its completion he continued his own projects, including a parsonage which was completed in 1908 and a parochial school begun in 1911.

The church featured a 185 ft steeple topped with a 14 ft cross which could be seen for miles. However, in the early 20th century tremendous winds collapsed the structure. It was decided not to rebuild and the cross was moved to the center peak of the roof.

The church underwent a complete interior restoration in 2017 under the leadership of Fr. Robert Lubic, returning it to its original Gothic design, including installing high altars, which had been lost during previous renovations. The parish celebrated its 150th anniversary in 2019 with a year-long celebration which included the dedication of a new electronic organ and a mass celebrated by Bishop Edward C. Malesic.

== Gallery ==
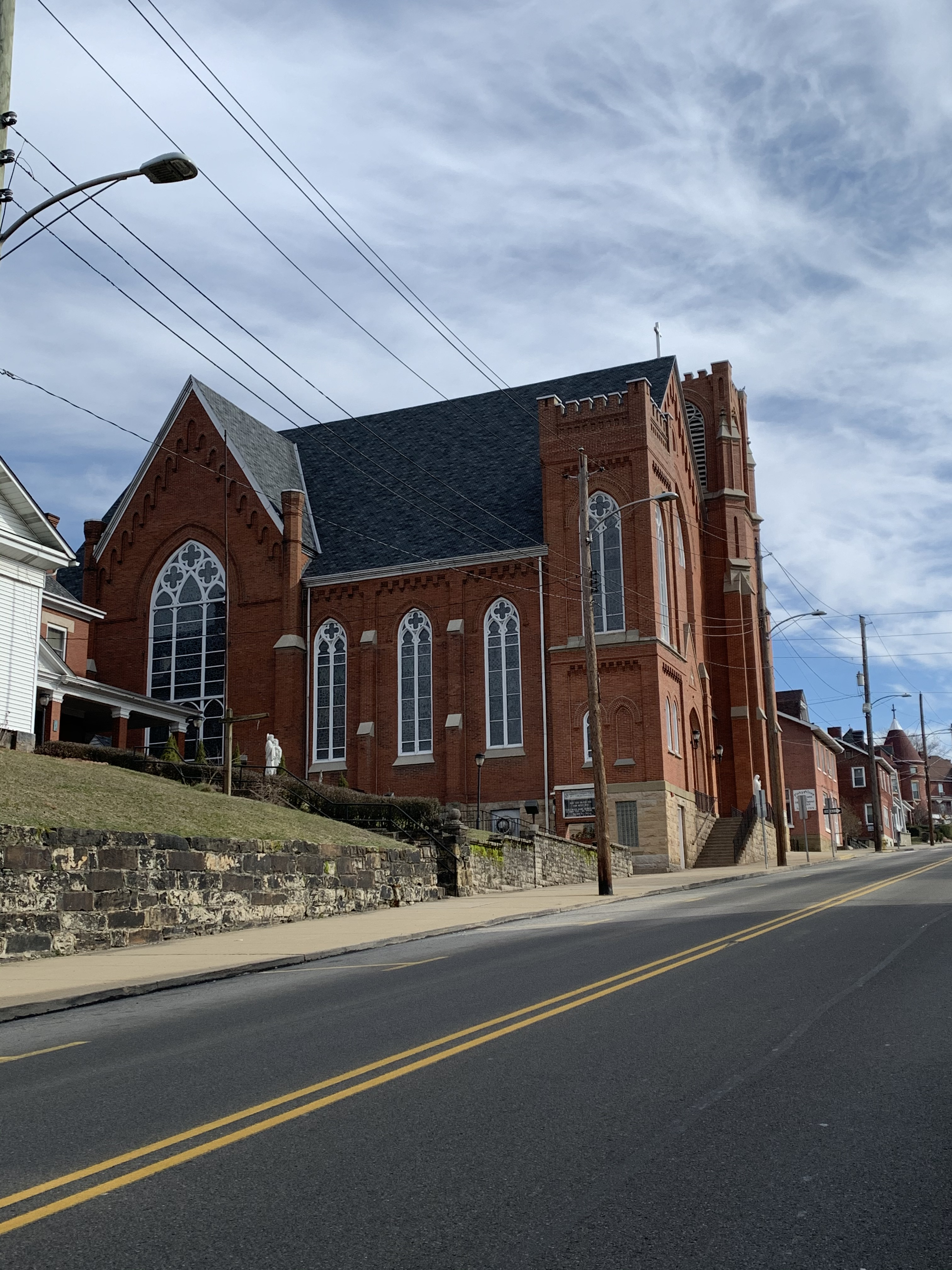
View from downhill in February 2020

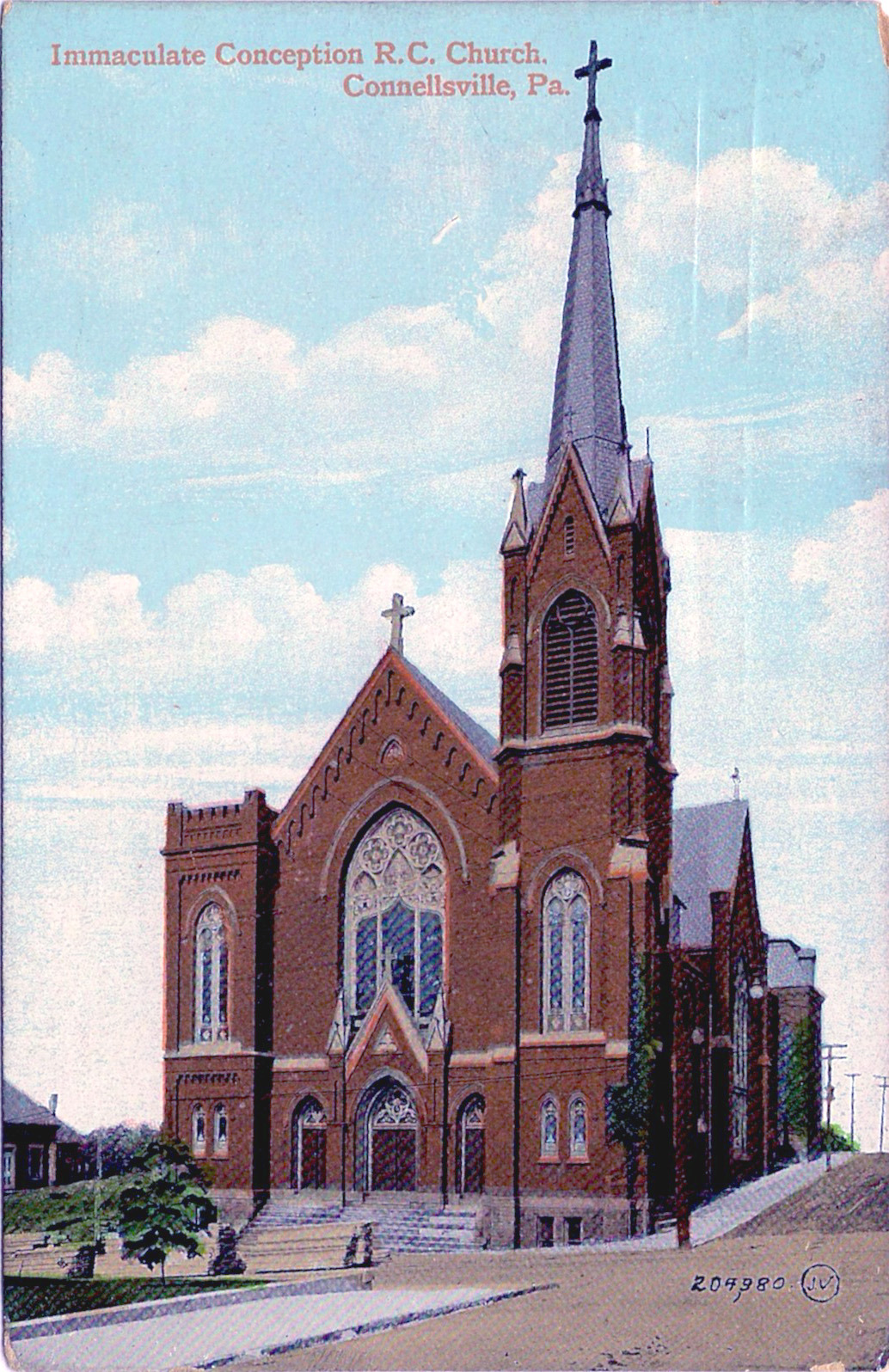
The church as seen in 1919 before the collapse of the spire
