= East Allegheny =

Neighborhood in Pennsylvania, US

- Neighborhood of Pittsburgh
- Coordinates: 40.456°N 80.000°W
- Country: United States
- State: Pennsylvania
- County: Allegheny County
- City: Pittsburgh

Area
  - Total: 0.236 sq mi (0.61 km^{2})

Population (2020)
  - Total: 1,903
  - Density: 8,060/sq mi (3,110/km^{2})
- ZIP Code: 15212
- Deutschtown Historic District
- U.S. National Register of Historic Places
- U.S. Historic district
- City of Pittsburgh Historic District
- Location within Pittsburgh Location within Pennsylvania Location within the United States
- Area: Roughly bounded by Cedar Avenue, Knoll, East, and Pressley Streets
- Architectural style: Late Victorian
- NRHP reference No.: 83004181

Significant dates
- Added to NRHP: November 25, 1983
- Designated CPHD: February 12, 1997

East Allegheny, also known as Deutschtown, is a neighborhood on Pittsburgh's North Side. It has a ZIP code of 15212, and has representation on Pittsburgh City Council by the council member for District 1 (North Central Neighborhoods). The Pittsburgh Bureau of Fire houses Engine 32, Truck 32 and Haz-Mat 3 in Deutschtown.

== History ==
In 1783, the Commonwealth of Pennsylvania established a 3000-acre tract of land north of where the Allegheny River merged with the Ohio River. John Redick created an initial town plan for Allegheny City – which featured 36 city blocks surrounded by a common grazing area – the following year. The common grazing area became a park now known as Allegheny Commons, and the area just east of the park – which had been set aside for farming in Redick's initial plan – is today's East Allegheny.

This area was developed between 1850 and 1900 by immigrants who were almost exclusively German. As a result, the area was called Dutchtown, a mispronunciation of Deutschtown. Its residents created a business district on East Ohio Street and a residential district running south of it, from Cedar Street (on the western border with Allegheny Commons) to Troy Hill (on the east). These buildings were very solidly built.

In 1984, this area was listed on the National Register of Historic Places as the Deutschtown Historic District. The nominating petition noted that "Dutchtown is distinguished from neighboring North Side neighborhoods by its ethnic associations and intense feeling of neighborhood solidarity. It also retains the busiest original commercial district left on the North Side since the development of Allegheny Center in the 1960s." The area is also a City of Pittsburgh Historic District.

Construction of Interstate 279 sliced the neighborhood in half, such that there is now a West Deutschtown (which runs from Allegheny Commons to the Interstate and contains the active business district on East Ohio Street) and an East Deutschtown (which runs from the Interstate to Troy Hill). Both sections of the neighborhood suffered as a result of the Interstate's construction: some residents moved, their homes were rented by absentee landlords to low-income tenants, and the area saw a general lack of investment. However, neighborhood activists established the East Allegheny Community Council and gradually restored the neighborhood, especially the western portion.

== Geography and transportation ==
East Allegheny is composed of "East Deutschtown," an area that is bounded by East Street, East Ohio Street, Goehring Street and Vinial Streets, and "West Deutschtown," which extends from Cedar Avenue to East Street and from the Norfolk Southern Mainline to Dunloe Street.

Surrounding neighborhoods include Allegheny Center, Fineview, Troy Hill, Spring Hill, and Spring Garden.

City buses that connect East Allegheny and downtown include the 1, 2, 4, 6, 7, 11, 12, and the 54a and 54b, which also connects East Allegheny with Oakland, the city's academic center.

== City Steps ==
The East Allegheny neighborhood has four distinct flights of city steps - all of which are open and in a safe condition. In East Allegheny, the public stairways in Pittsburgh quickly connect pedestrians to public transportation and provide an easy way to travel through this densely populated area.

== Organization ==
The neighborhood citizens group is the East Allegheny Community Council. The organization offers a self-guided walking tour for the neighborhood (available from its website).

== Gallery ==
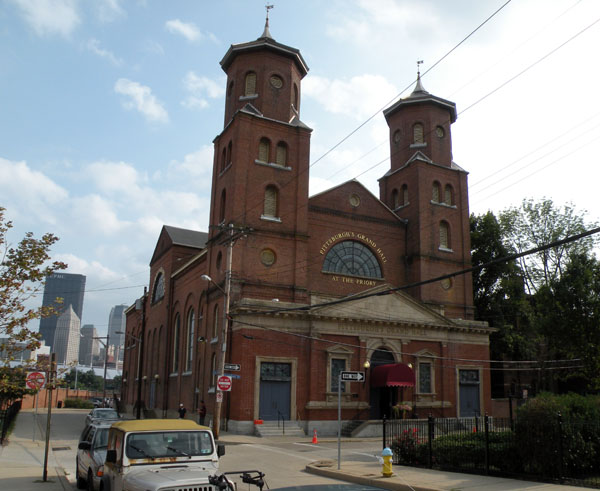
Pittsburgh's Grand Hall at the Priory (formerly St. Mary's German Catholic Church), built in 1854, located at the corner of Pressley, Nash and Lockhart Streets

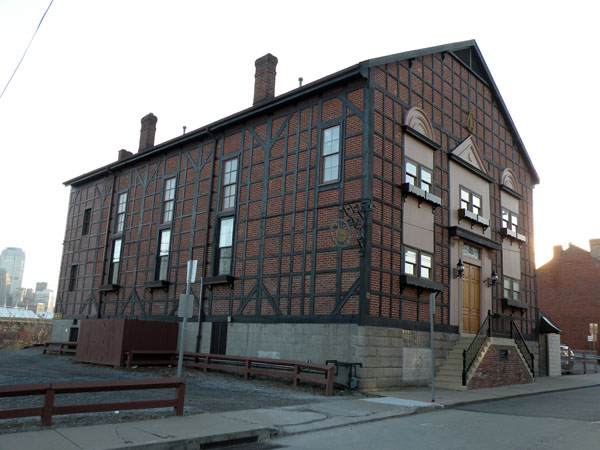
Teutonia Männerchor Hall, built in 1888 by George Ott, located at 857 Phineas Street

St. Mary's Priory, built in 1888, located at 614 Pressley Street

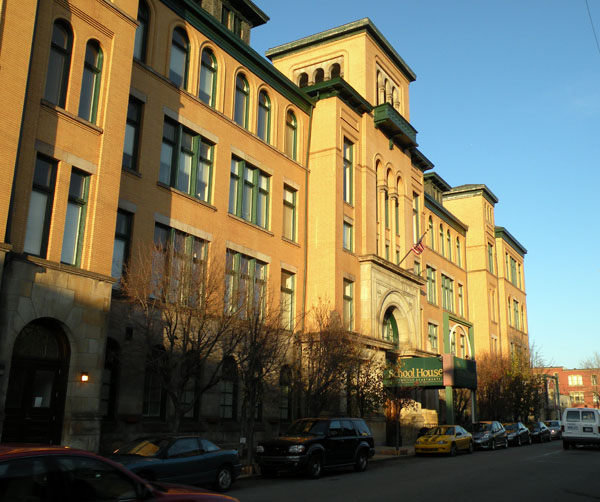
Latimer School, built in 1898 by Frederick C. Sauer, located at Tripoli and James Streets

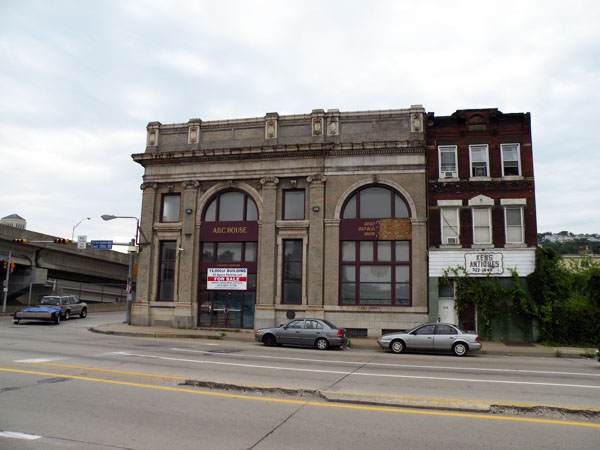
Former Workingman's Savings Bank & Trust Co. Building (also the former ARC House Building), built in 1901, located at 800 East Ohio Street

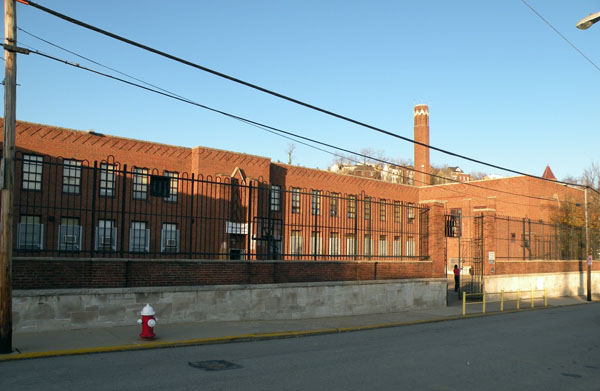
Schiller School, built in 1939, located at 1018 Peralta Street

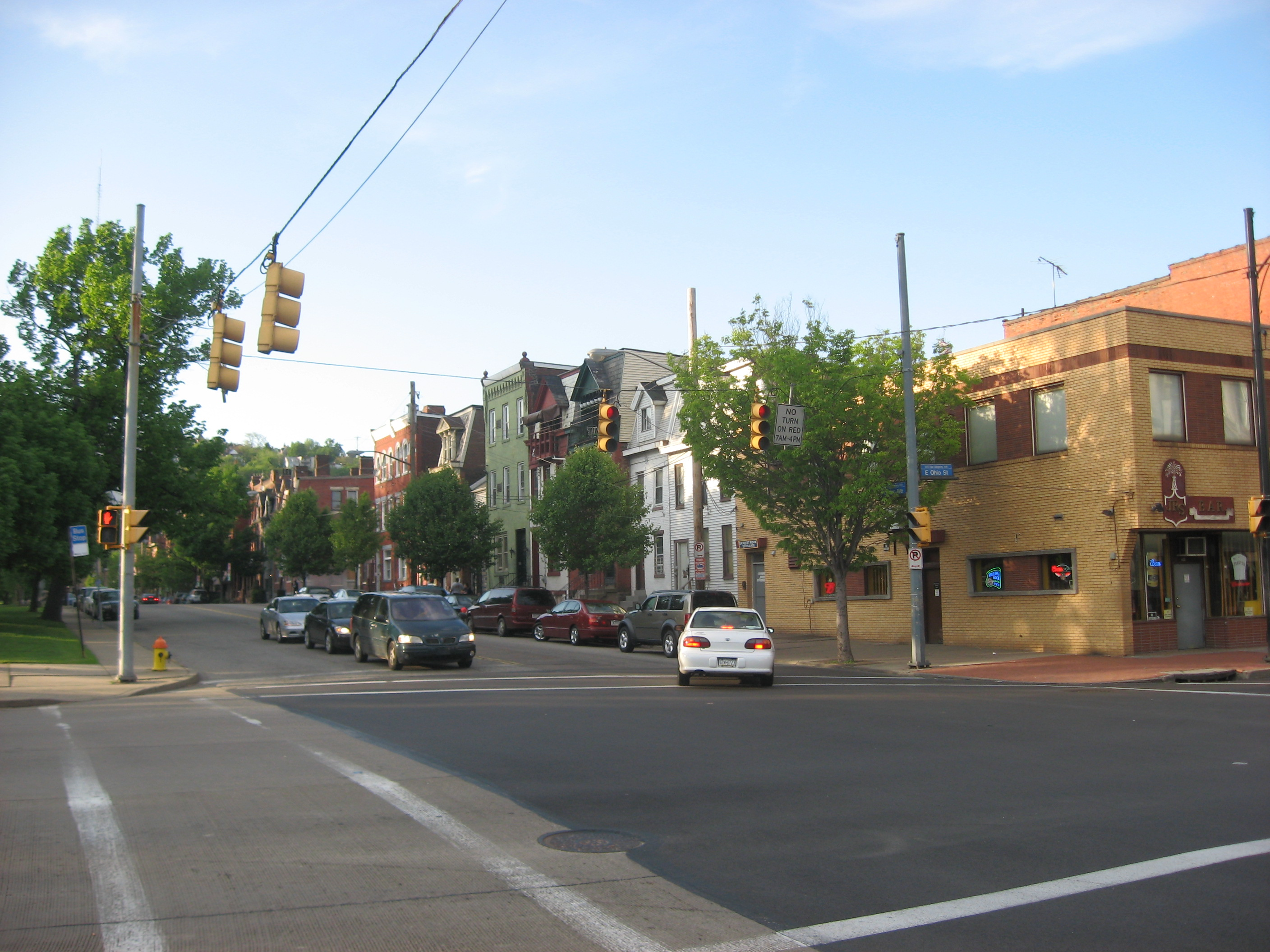
Buildings along Cedar Avenue north of its intersection with Ohio Street

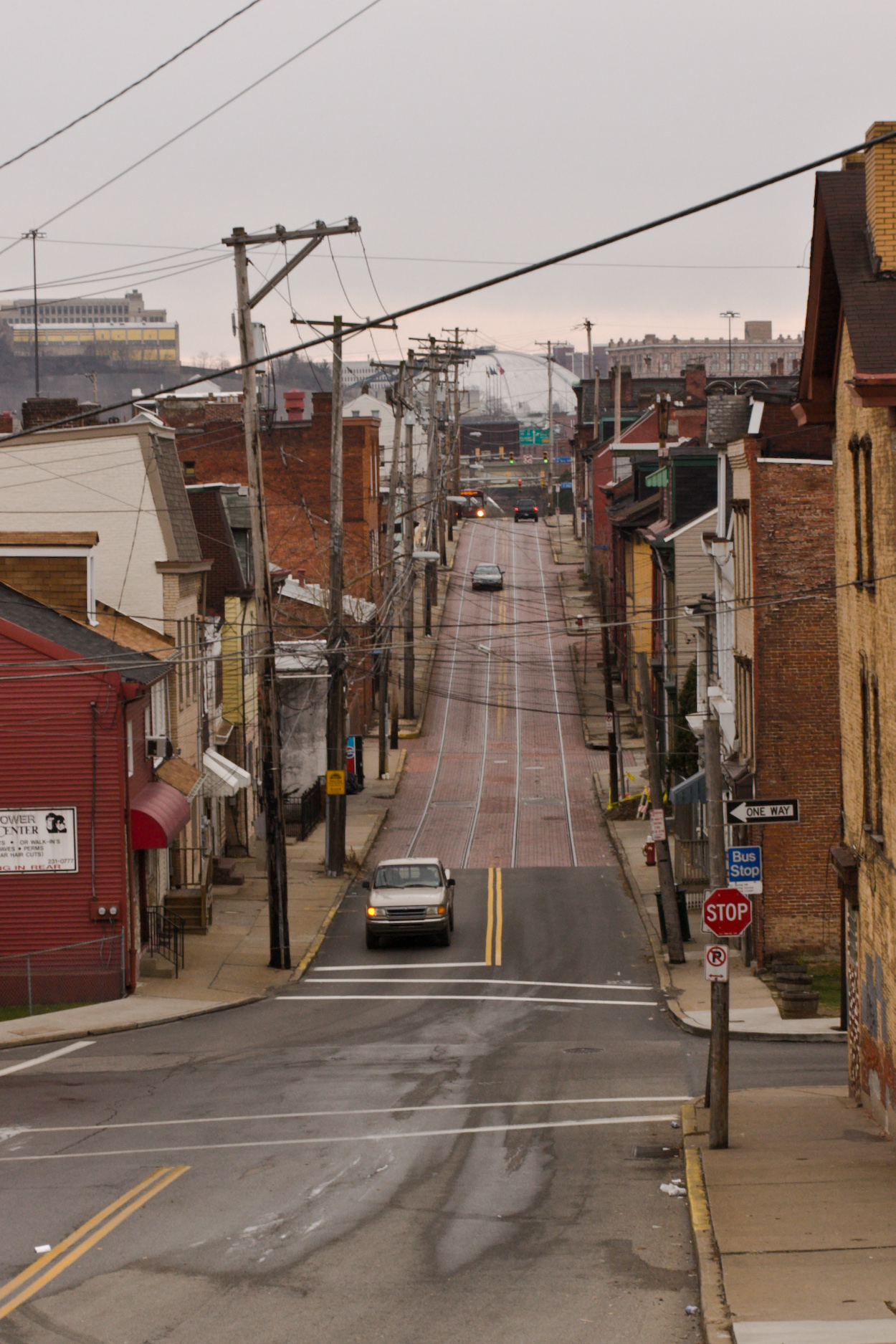
A view down Chestnut Street in East Deutschtown

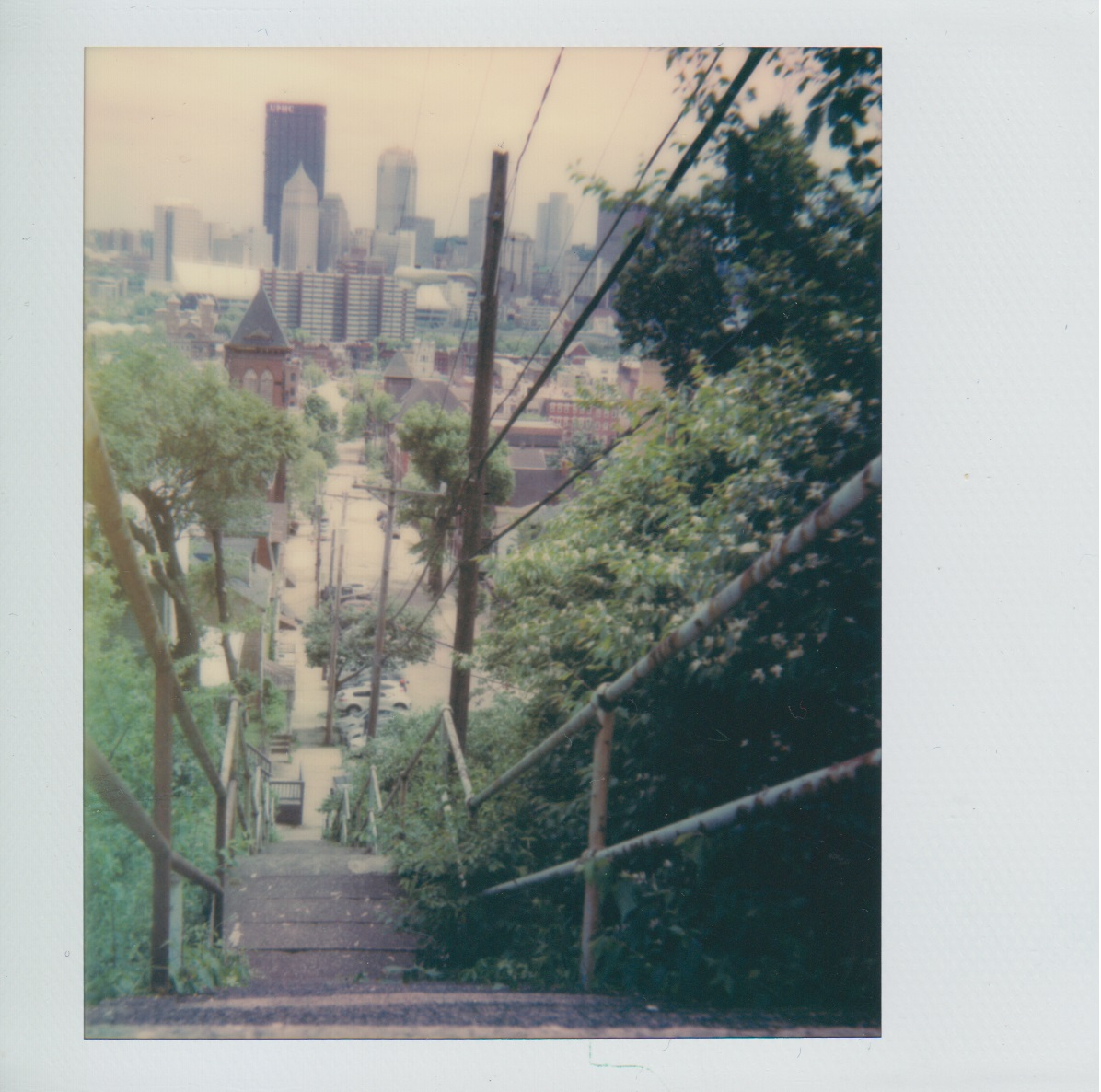
The Middle Street city steps in East Allegheny

== Pop Culture ==
In the CBS crime drama Criminal Minds, Jennifer Jareau was born and raised in East Allegheny.

== See also ==
- List of Pittsburgh neighborhoods
- Deutschtown Music Festival
