= Deutschtown Music Festival =

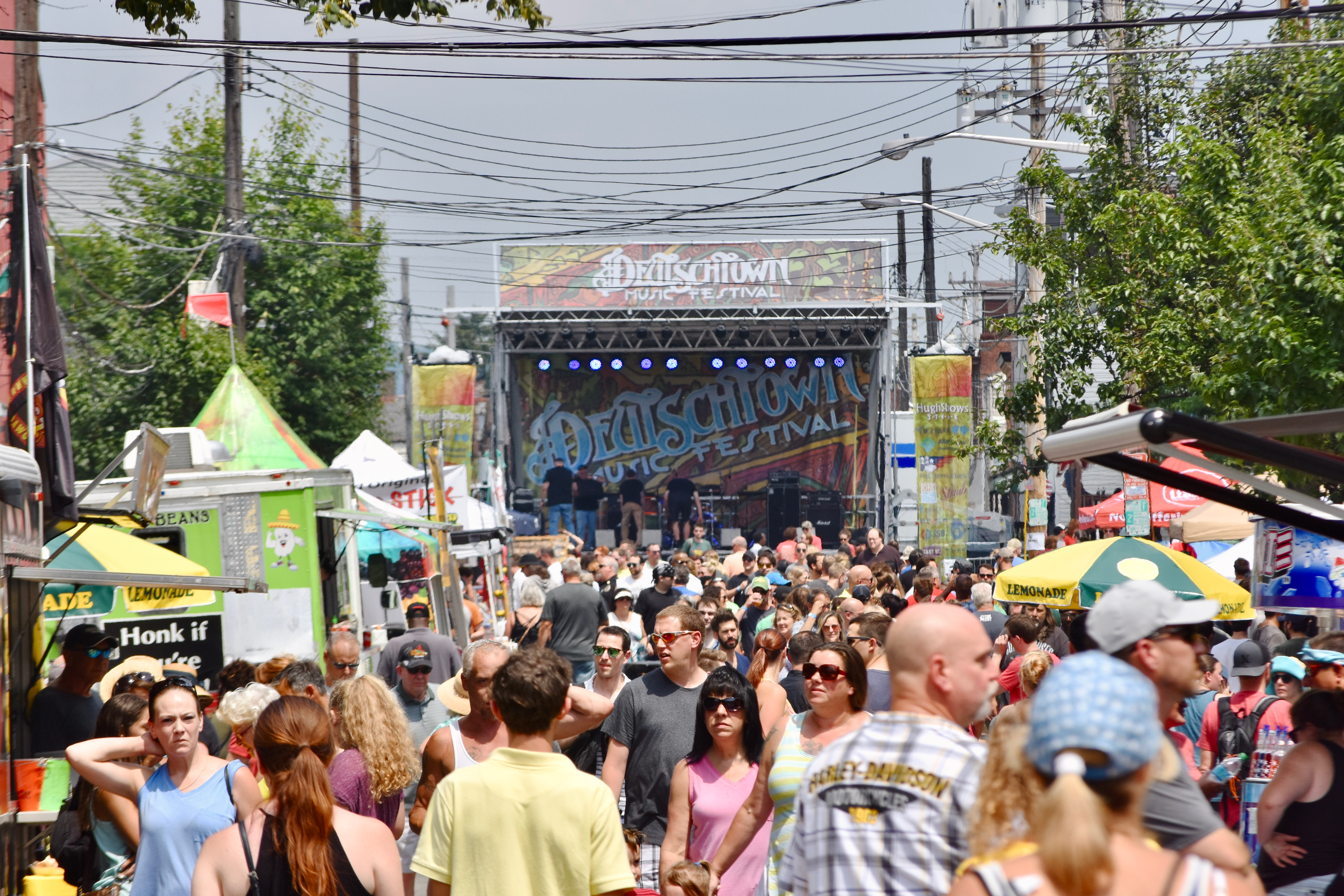
- Deutschtown Music Festival in 2018
- Genre: Alternative, Americana, Bluegrass, Blues, Contemporary, Country, Electronic, Folk, Funk, Gospel, Hard rock, Metal, Hip hop, Indie, Jam band, Jazz, Pop, R&B, Rock
- Dates: 20–23 July 2024
- Locations: Pittsburgh, Pennsylvania
- Years active: 2013-19, 2021-present
- Founders: Ben Soltesz, Hugh Twyman, Cody Walters
- Attendance: 25,000 (2019)
- Organizer: Northside Leadership Conference
- Website: deutschtownmusicfestival.com

Deutschtown Music Festival is an annual community music festival in Pittsburgh, Pennsylvania. The festival features over 35 stages and 400 bands performing across Deutschtown for which the festival is named. It is the largest free music festival in Pittsburgh and one of the largest free three-day music and arts festivals in America.

There was no festival in 2020.

== See also ==
- East Allegheny (Pittsburgh)
