= St. Nicholas Croatian Church (Pittsburgh, Pennsylvania) =

Former Catholic church in Pittsburgh, Pennsylvania

Saint Nicholas Croatian Catholic Church
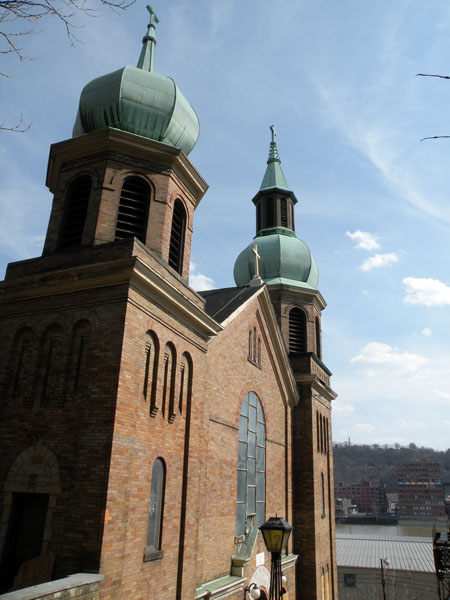
- Former St. Nicholas Church, now demolished

- Location within Pittsburgh
- 40°27′30.36″N 79°59′12.02″W
- Location: 1326 East Ohio Street (Troy Hill), Pittsburgh, Pennsylvania, USA

History
- Built: 1904

Site notes
- Area: Troy Hill neighborhood of Pittsburgh, Pennsylvania
- Architect: Frederick C. Sauer

Saint Nicholas Croatian Catholic Church was a Roman Catholic church located at 1326 East Ohio Street in the Troy Hill neighborhood of Pittsburgh, Pennsylvania. The Croatian Catholic parish of St. Nicholas was established in 1894 as the first Croatian Catholic parish in the United States, in the city of Allegheny, now Pittsburgh's North Shore.

== Founding ==
As the number of Croatian residents increased in the North Shore area, the congregation of St. Nicholas split in 1900 and formed a second parish, also named St. Nicholas, in Troy Hill. This particular site, known as St. Nicholas Northside, was an offshoot of that first Croatian Catholic Parish in the United States. The original parish of St. Nicholas Croatian Church was moved to Millvale with its pastor, Father Glonjaric.

To design the new structure, the congregation chose Frederick C. Sauer, designer of the Allegheny St. Nicholas. Construction began in 1900 and completed in 1904. Because the St. Nicholas in Allegheny burned in 1921 and was replaced by a new church in 1922, again designed by Sauer, the Troy Hill St. Nicholas was an older structure leading many to believe it was the first of the two congregations. This acrimony led to bitter tensions between the two parishes that linger even to this day in spite of the fact that under canon law a parish moves with its pastor, and the first parish site in Allegheny superseded both Millvale and Troy Hill.

== Closure and demolition ==
The structure was added to the List of City of Pittsburgh historic designations on July 13, 2001. The congregation protested the designation saying it would limit later uses and alterations to the building. Following a structural inspection 2004, it was determined that the Troy Hill building was unfit to use. The pastoral council met and voted to recommend closure, with the member from North Side refusing to vote. An attempt in November 2004 to unite the two St. Nicholas Congregations failed due to the aforementioned acrimony leaving the Troy Hill sanctuary vacant and it former members defecting to other parishes.

Several potential buyers proposed offers to the Diocese of Pittsburgh however, none was able to agree on terms with the diocese. Citing the $360,000 annual maintenance cost and concern over its structural integrity, the diocese sought to demolish the property. The city's Historic Review Commission denied the diocese's request citing an offer to convert the sanctuary to a museum.

The congregation and diocese appealed to the Common Pleas Court and was successful in summer 2012. Work began in October 2012 to remove windows and some artifacts and the structure was razed in January, 2013. The National Trust for Historic Preservation cited the site as one of ten historic sites lost in 2013.

Even if a buyer for the structure had been found to preserve the building, it is likely that it would still have been demolished. Concurrent with the debate over the building's fate were plans for PennDOT to widen Pennsylvania Route 28 and eliminate at-grade crossings from Millvale to the North Shore, making it a complete freeway from the city to Kittanning. PennDOT subsequently bought the property from the diocese after demolition via eminent domain, using the leftover land after widening as a small park with a promenade and a retaining wall which features several murals on the city's history, including that of the structure itself on the structure's site.
