= Sauer Buildings Historic District =

Historic district in Pennsylvania, United States

- U.S. National Register of Historic Places
- U.S. Historic district
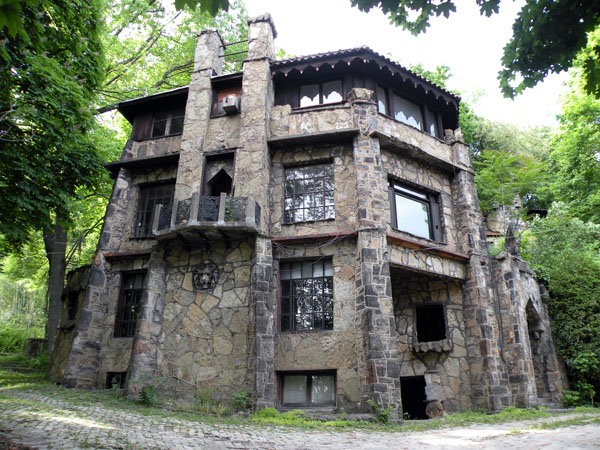
- Sauer's "Heidelberg" apartment house

- Location within Pennsylvania
- Location: 607–717 Center Avenue Aspinwall, Pennsylvania
- Coordinates: 40°29′41.82″N 79°54′12.24″W
- Area: 30 acres (120,000 m^{2}), 9 buildings
- Built: 1898–1942
- Architectural style: Fantastic, Medieval Revival, Colonial Revival
- NRHP reference No.: 85002296
- Added to NRHP: September 11, 1985

Sauer Buildings Historic District, located between 607 and 717 Center Avenue in Aspinwall, Pennsylvania, consists of a group of buildings designed and built by Frederick C. Sauer from 1898 until his death in 1942. This historic district was added to the National Register of Historic Places on September 11, 1985.

== History ==
In 1898, Frederick Sauer bought a hillside tract of land in Aspinwall, Pennsylvania, and built a home for himself and his family. This house was designed in "conventional fashion out of ordinary Kittanning brick on a four-square Colonial Revival footprint." Sauer was an architect by trade, and he designed about a dozen Catholic churches in the Pittsburgh area, most of which were fashioned in some variation of Romanesque Revival style.

After many years of designing buildings to suit the wants and needs of his public, Sauer constructed a group of buildings for his own amusement on his plot of land in Aspinwall. He began to construct rental properties, acting as his own designer, mason, bricklayer, and carpenter. From 1928 through 1930, he converted his former chicken coop into a three-story apartment house called "Heidelberg". After this eccentric building, he gradually transformed his wooded hillside into an architectural fantasy, and a complex of castlesque buildings and landscape features in Fantastic architectural style took shape and was progressively added to by Sauer until his death in 1942.

== Reception ==
"It is the most bizarre collection of buildings in Western Pennsylvania," says Franklin Toker, professor of art and architecture at the University of Pittsburgh.

"This fantastic group of buildings constructed by a local architect in the later years of his life is possibly unique in Pittsburgh." – James D. Van Trump and Arthur P. Ziegler, Jr.

"Sauer really seems to have made one of those odd essays in personal expression in building that turn up now and then in some otherwise-staid part of the world." – Walter C. Kidney

== Gallery ==
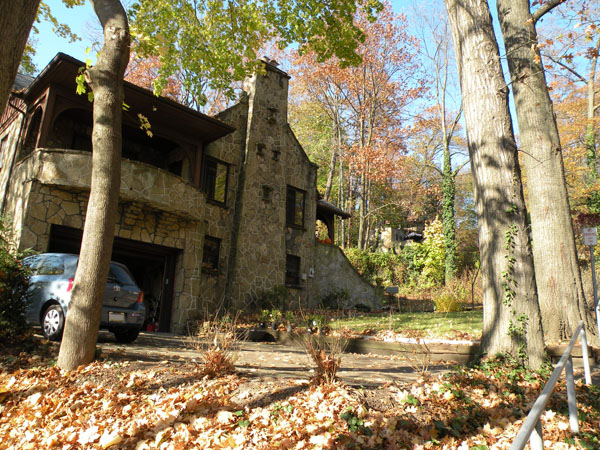
Sauer Buildings Historic District located between 607 and 717 Center Avenue in Aspinwall, Pennsylvania

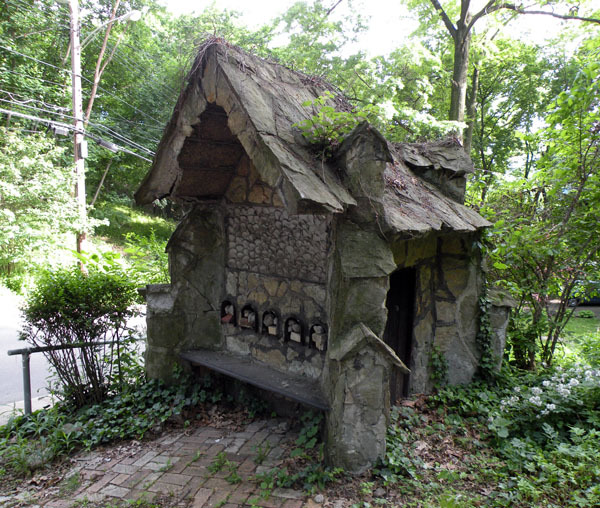
Sauer's fantastical mailbox circa 1930

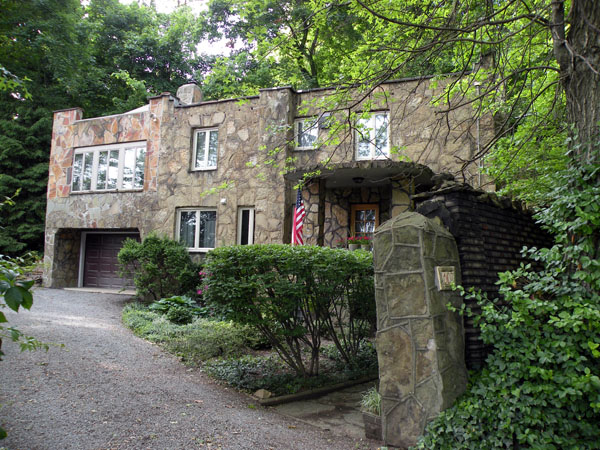
Apartment building at 607 Center Avenue circa 1930

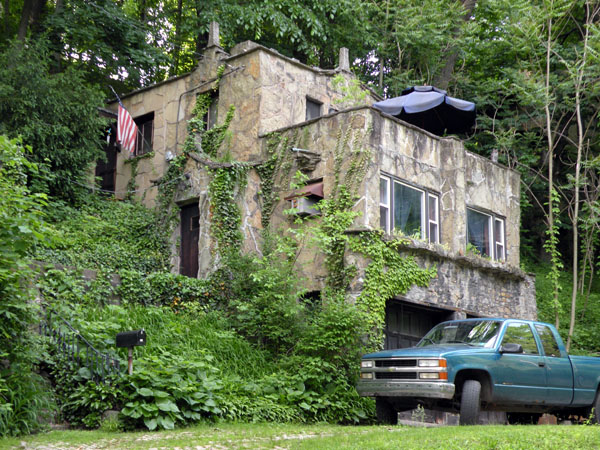
Another apartment building circa 1930

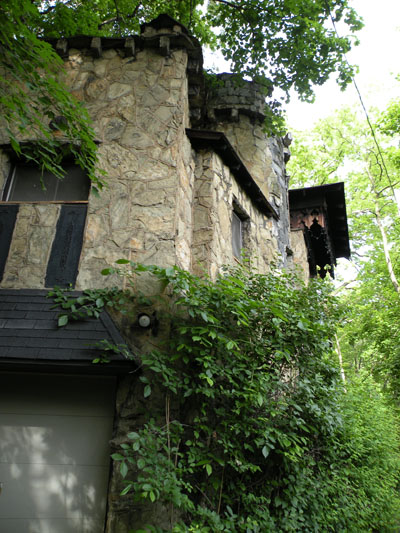
Apartment building with a turret circa 1930

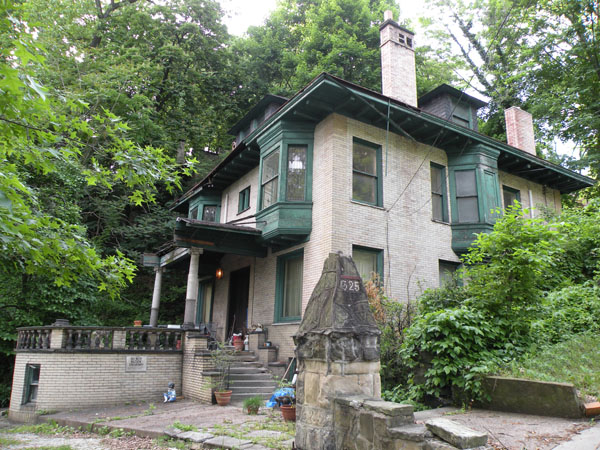
Sauer House, built in 1898, at 625 Center Avenue

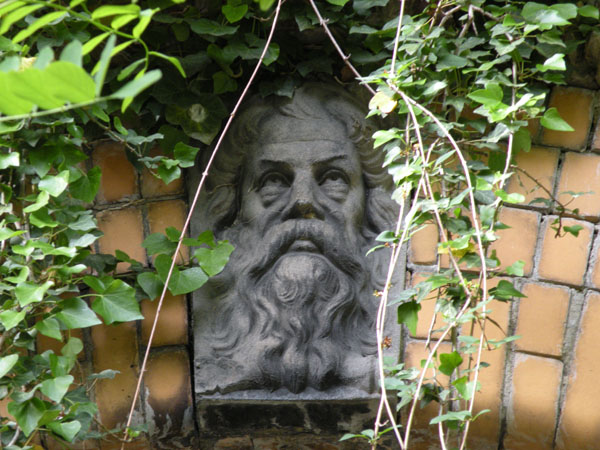
Stone face keystone on the arched doorway of a building circa 1930

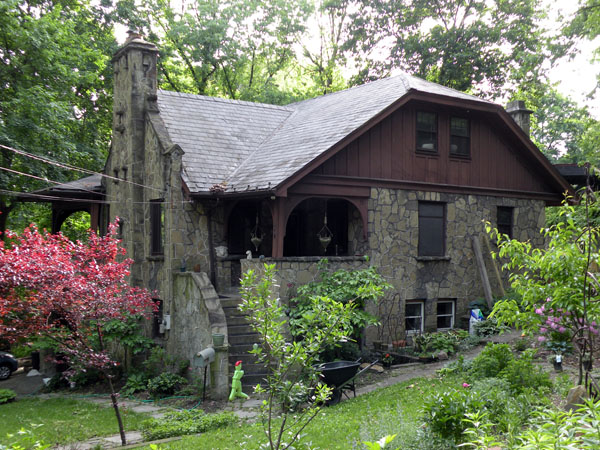
House at 615 Center Avenue circa 1930
