= Workingman's Savings Bank & Trust Co. =

Historic building in Pittsburgh, USA

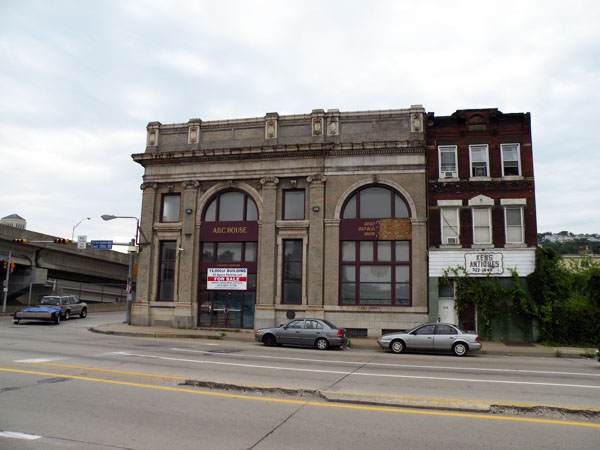

- Location within Pittsburgh
- 40°27′15.47″N 79°59′48.31″W
- Location: 800 East Ohio Street (East Allegheny), Pittsburgh, Pennsylvania, USA

History
- Built: 1901

The Workingman's Savings Bank & Trust Co. Building, which is located at 800 East Ohio Street in the East Allegheny neighborhood of Pittsburgh, Pennsylvania, was built in 1901.

It was added to the List of City of Pittsburgh historic designations on March 10, 2009.

== History and architectural features ==
Formerly a Mellon Bank until 1971, this building was sold to the Catholic Diocese of Pittsburgh with plans to convert it to a church; however, the expense of the project proved too costly and it was instead donated to the ARC House rehabilitation center network. The building was used as its headquarters from 1976 to 2006. It is currently vacant.

It was added to the List of City of Pittsburgh historic designations on March 10, 2009.
