= St. Nicholas Croatian Church (Millvale, Pennsylvania) =

- U.S. National Register of Historic Places
- Pittsburgh Landmark – PHLF
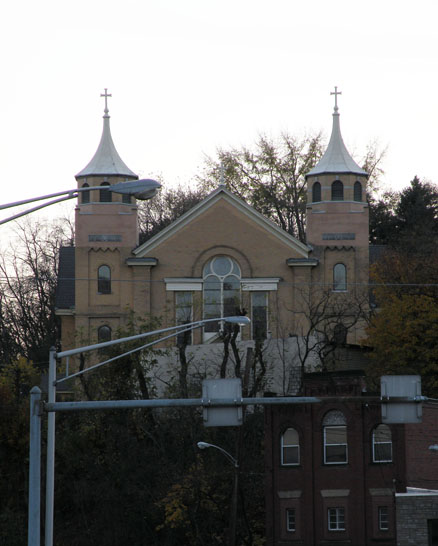

- Location within Pennsylvania Location within the United States
- Interactive map of St. Nicholas Croatian Church
- Location: 24 Maryland Ave., Millvale, Pennsylvania
- Coordinates: 40°28′37.36″N 79°58′10.88″W
- Built: 1922
- Architect: Frederick C. Sauer
- Architectural style: Romanesque Revival
- NRHP reference No.: 80003404

Significant dates
- Added to NRHP: May 6, 1980
- Designated PHLF: 1979

St. Nicholas Croatian Church is a Roman Catholic church in Millvale, Pennsylvania, United States, within the Roman Catholic Diocese of Pittsburgh. It is listed on the National Register of Historic Places and is best known for its fresco murals by Maxo Vanka, painted in 1937 and 1941, including Immigrant Mother Raises Her Sons for American Industry and The Capitalist. In 1937, Time described the murals as "one of the few distinguished sets of church murals in the U.S."

== History ==
The parish was established in 1900 following a split from the similarly named St. Nicholas Croatian Church in Troy Hill, approximately 2 miles (3.2 km) downriver. The cornerstone for the new church was laid in July 1900, and the building was completed later that year. Designed by Pittsburgh architect Frederick C. Sauer in the Romanesque Revival style, the church cost approximately $34,000 to construct. Andrew Carnegie donated a pipe organ installed in 1902.

In March 1921, the church was destroyed by fire, believed to have been caused by arson. Sauer was again commissioned to design a replacement structure, a simplified version of his original plan. The current building was dedicated on May 30, 1922.

Following reconstruction, the parish carried significant debt. In 1931, the pastor of the Troy Hill parish, Albert Zagar, who had successfully eliminated debt there, was transferred to Millvale. By 1937, he had largely cleared the parish's financial obligations and elected to commission murals for the church interior. Seeking an artist familiar with the cultural background of the congregation, Zagar consulted the Slovene-American writer Louis Adamic, who recommended his friend Maxo Vanka, a Croatian-born artist and former professor at the Academy of Fine Arts, University of Zagreb.

Vanka painted the first cycle of murals between April and June 1937, reportedly working until the early morning hours each day. During this period, he became convinced the church was haunted by a black-robed apparition, an experience Adamic later recounted in Harper's Magazine under the title The Millvale Apparition. Despite "defying tradition" by introducing labor and social justice imagery into a sacred setting, the murals were well received by both church officials and the press.

Vanka was invited to return in 1941 to complete a second cycle of murals, which were dedicated on November 16 of that year. Created during the early years of World War II, these later works adopted more overtly anti-war themes. Upon completion of the full program, the Pittsburgh Press wrote that the murals placed the church near the top of the region's "must list" of sites to visit, while the Sun-Telegraph remarked that Vanka and Zagar were "tossing the dogmas of religious art into the ash-can." Vanka later described the murals as "my contribution to America."

In 2019, St. Nicholas was reorganized as a personal (non-territorial) parish within the Shrines of Pittsburgh, a grouping intended to promote pilgrimage and heritage tourism.

== Murals ==
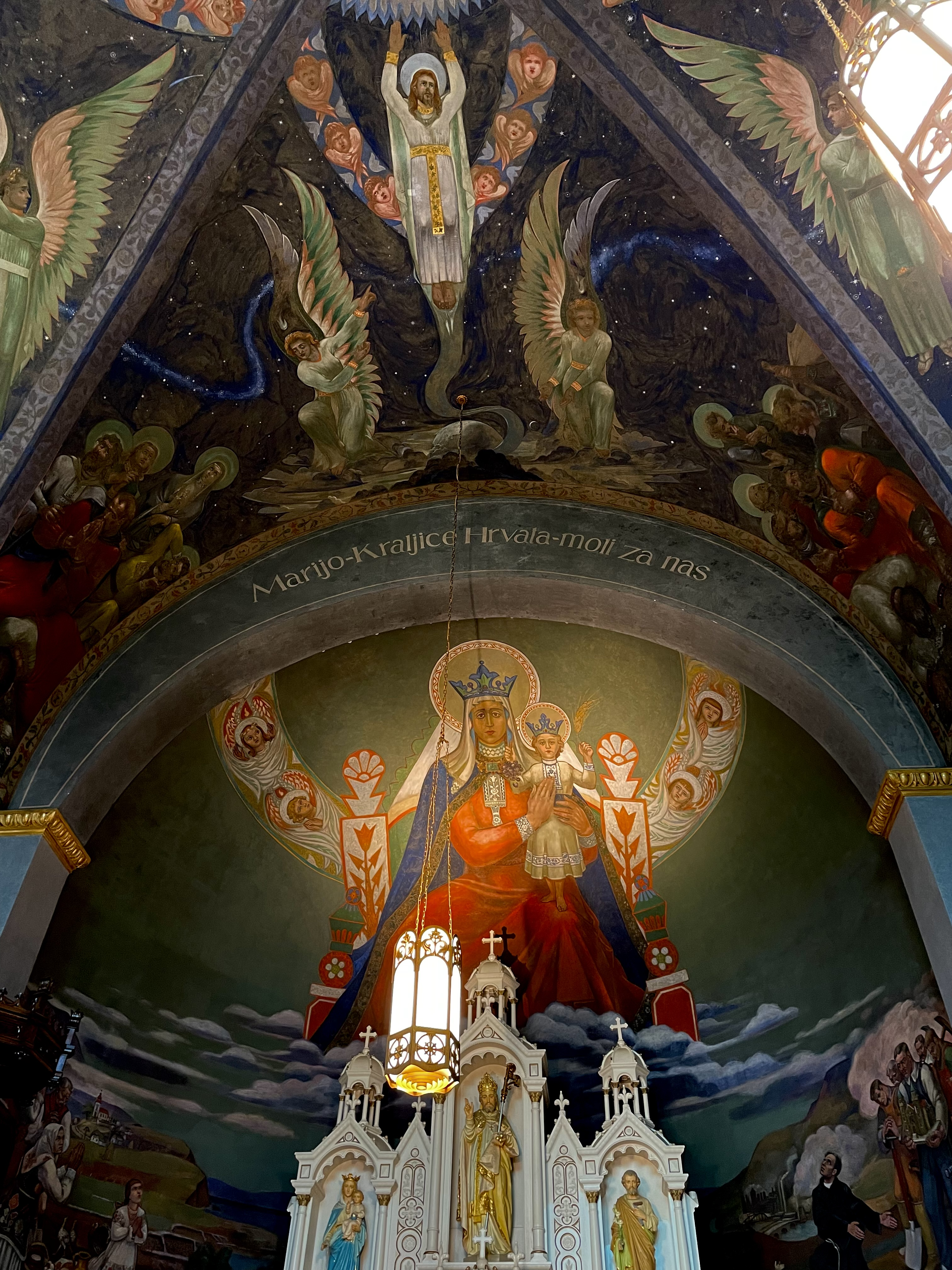
Altar at the church featuring Maxo Vanka mural

A total of 25 fresco murals by Maxo Vanka cover approximately 4,500 square feet (420 m^{2}) of the church's apse, walls, and ceiling. The decorative program combines traditional Christian iconography with social and political themes reflecting the Croatian American immigrant experience, including war, economic exploitation, and injustice.

The apse and ceiling vaults follow the Byzantine tradition, featuring Mary as Queen of Heaven above the altar, along with depictions of the Ascension of Jesus and the Four Evangelists. Elsewhere, Vanka painted scenes from the Old and New Testaments, images of saints, and allegorical works addressing social inequality. Notable murals include Immigrant Mother Raises Her Sons for American Industry, depicting Croatian women mourning a son killed in a mining accident; The American Capitalist, portraying a wealthy man indifferent to poverty; and Injustice, showing a gas-masked figure weighing gold against bread. Anti-war imagery includes a crucified Jesus pierced by a soldier's bayonet and the Virgin Mary breaking a rifle.

A separate mural behind the altar was added in 1970 by artist Joko Knezevich.

== Preservation ==
The Society to Preserve the Millvale Murals of Maxo Vanka conducts regular guided tours and conservation efforts. A 2022 Save America's Treasures grant for mural restoration was terminated in April 2025 following the elimination of the Institute of Museum and Library Services but was reinstated several weeks later after lobbying by the Society and U.S. Representative Chris Deluzio.

== Gallery ==
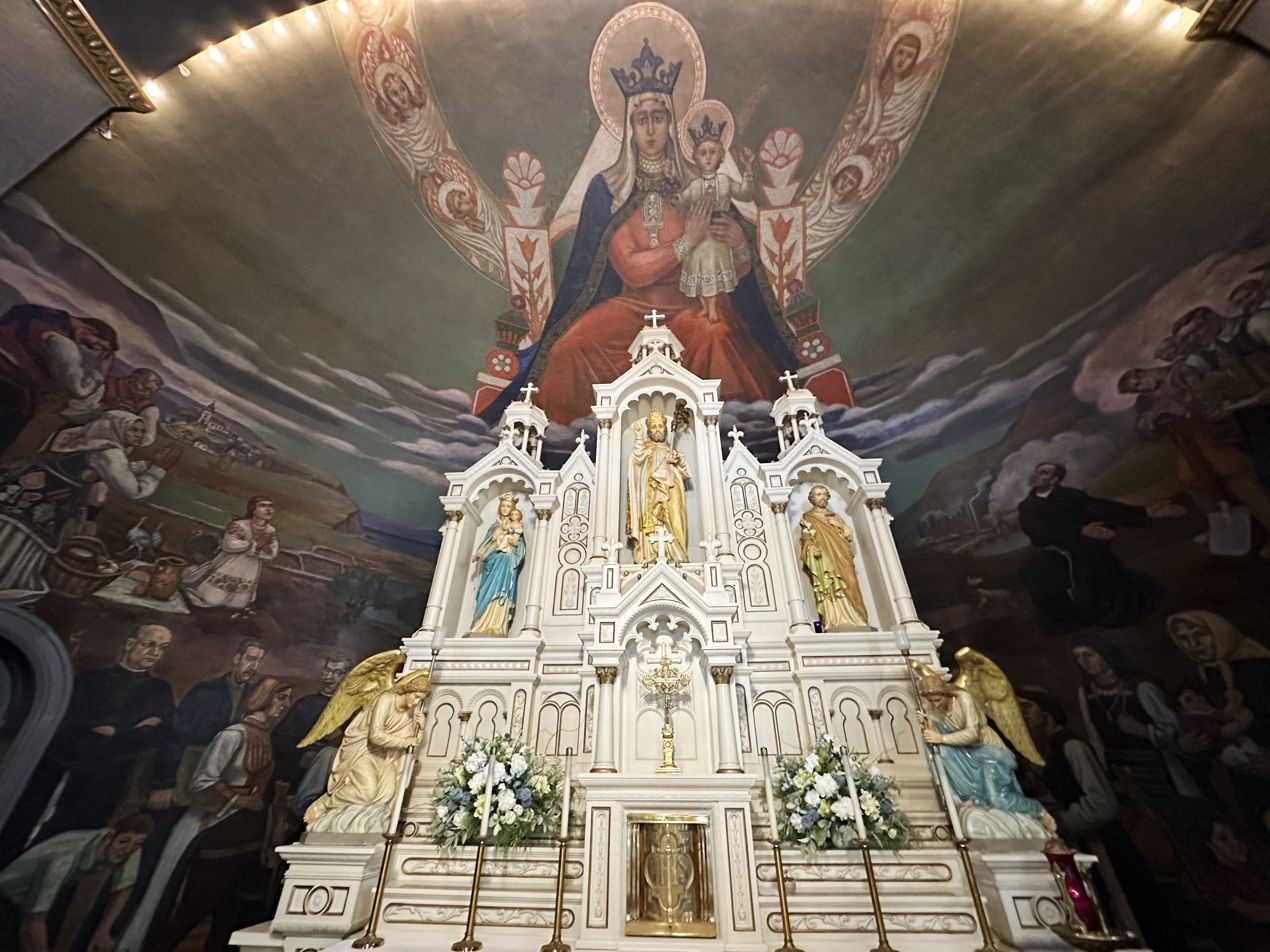
Mary, Queen of Croatia and Arch mural and church altar

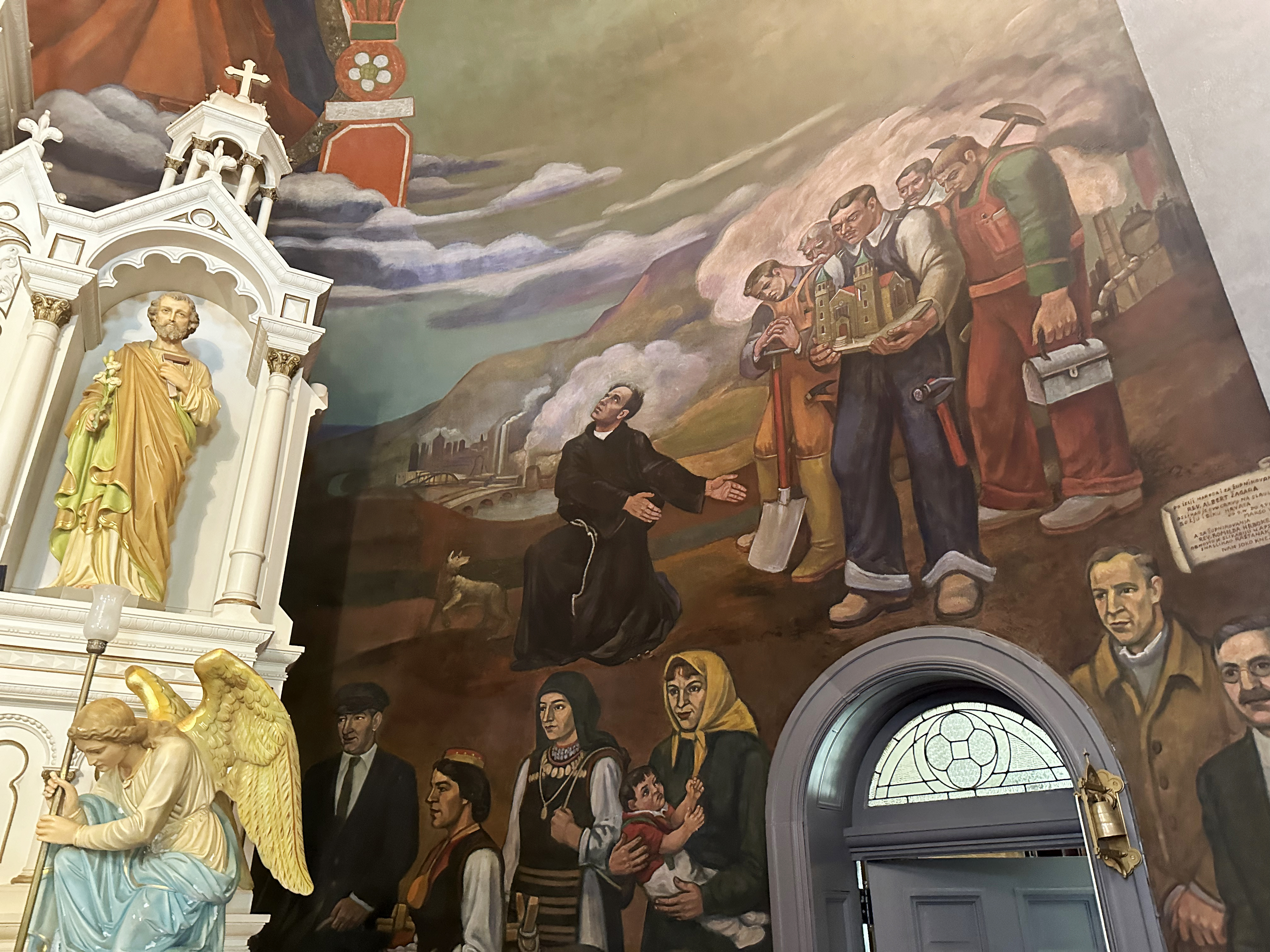
Croatians in America

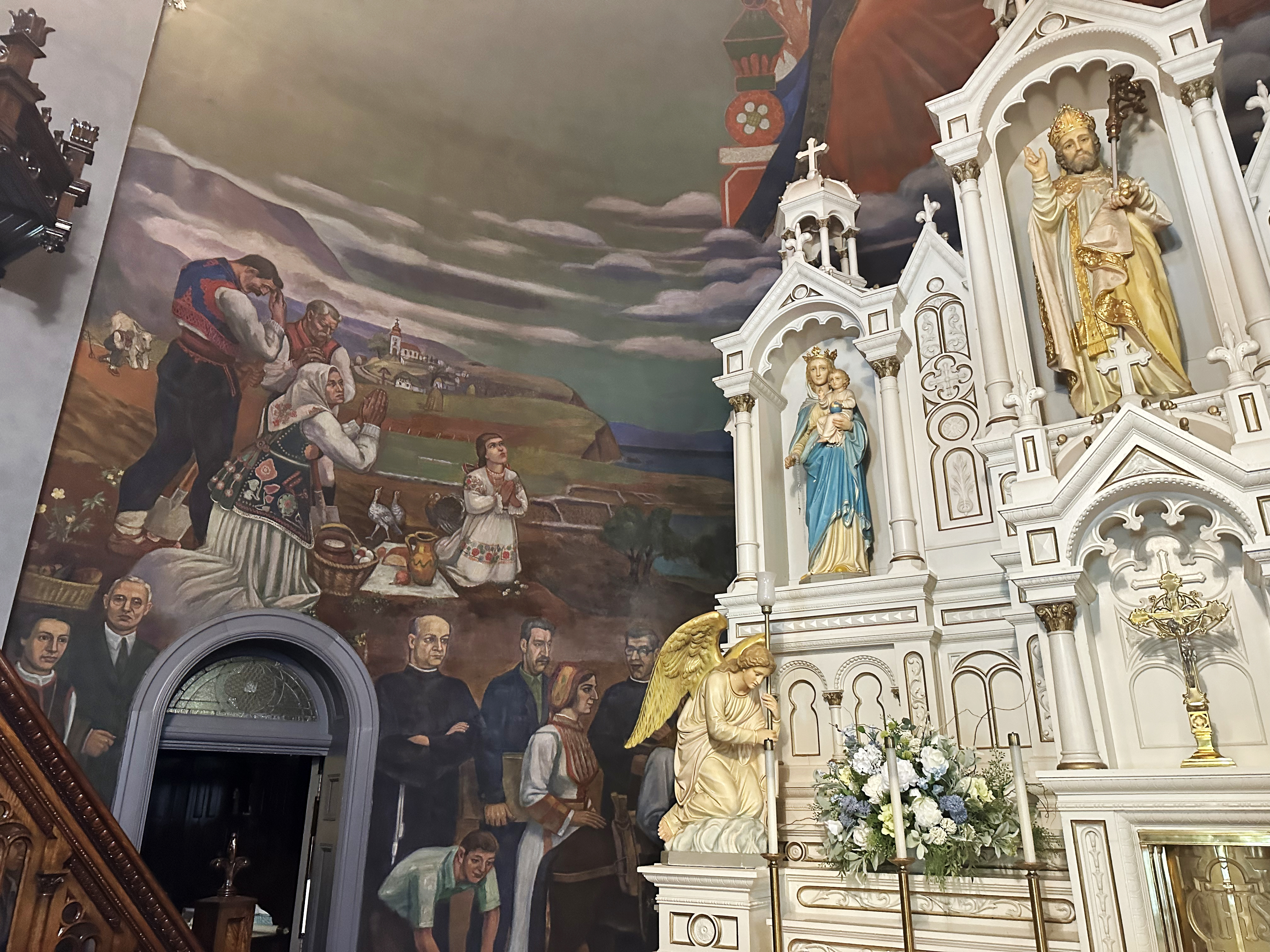
Pastoral Croatia

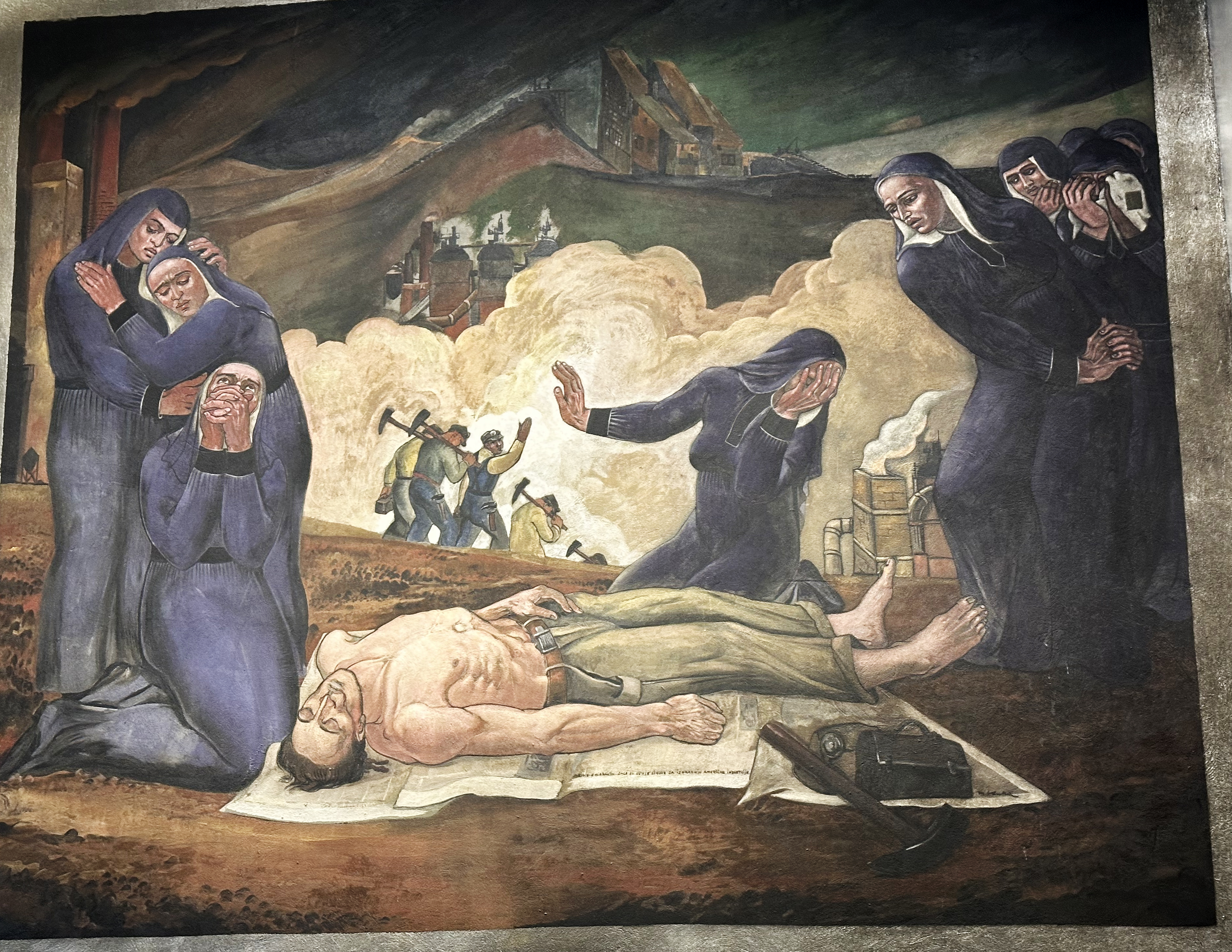
Immigrant Mother Raises Her Sons for American Industry

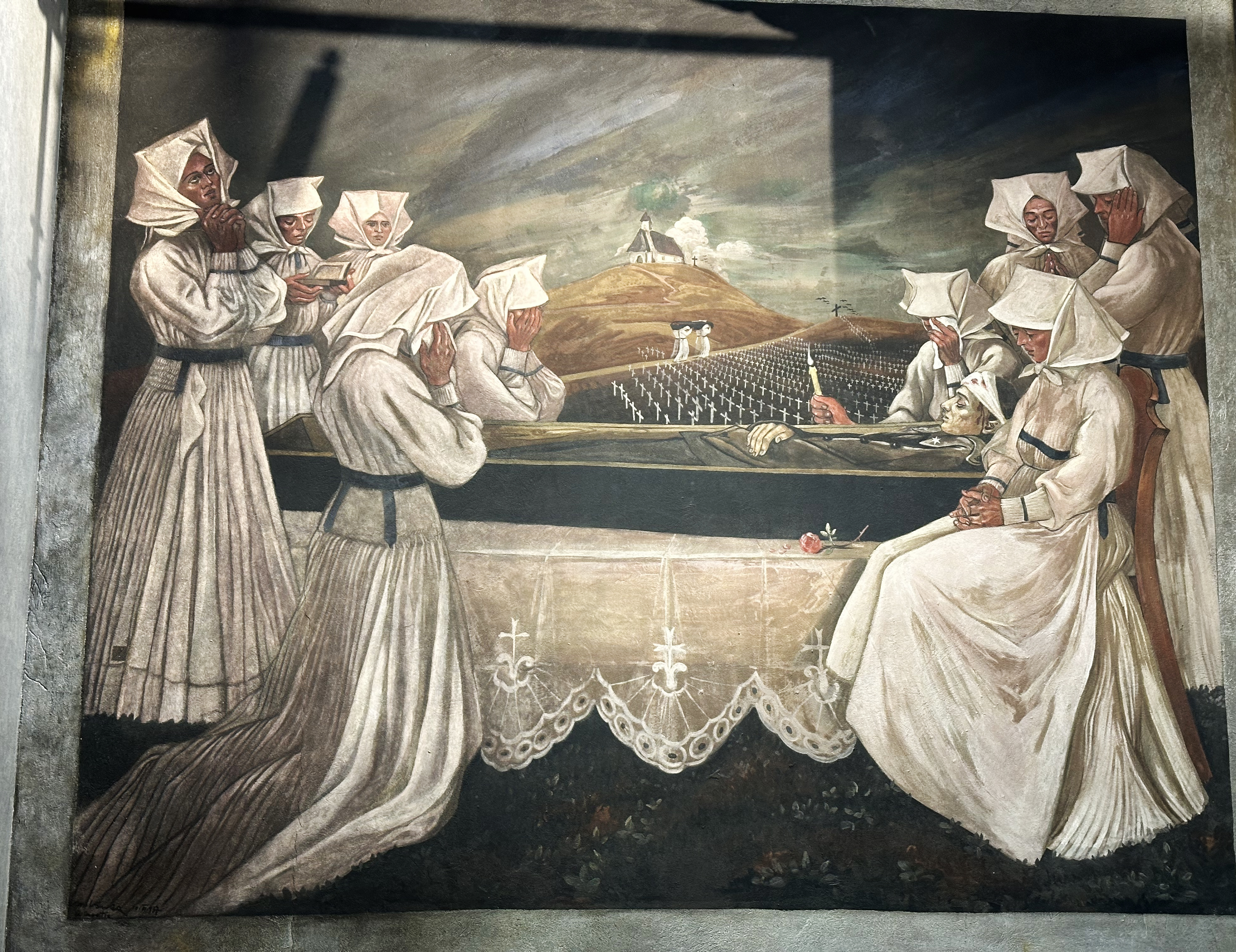
Croatian Mother Raises Her Son for War

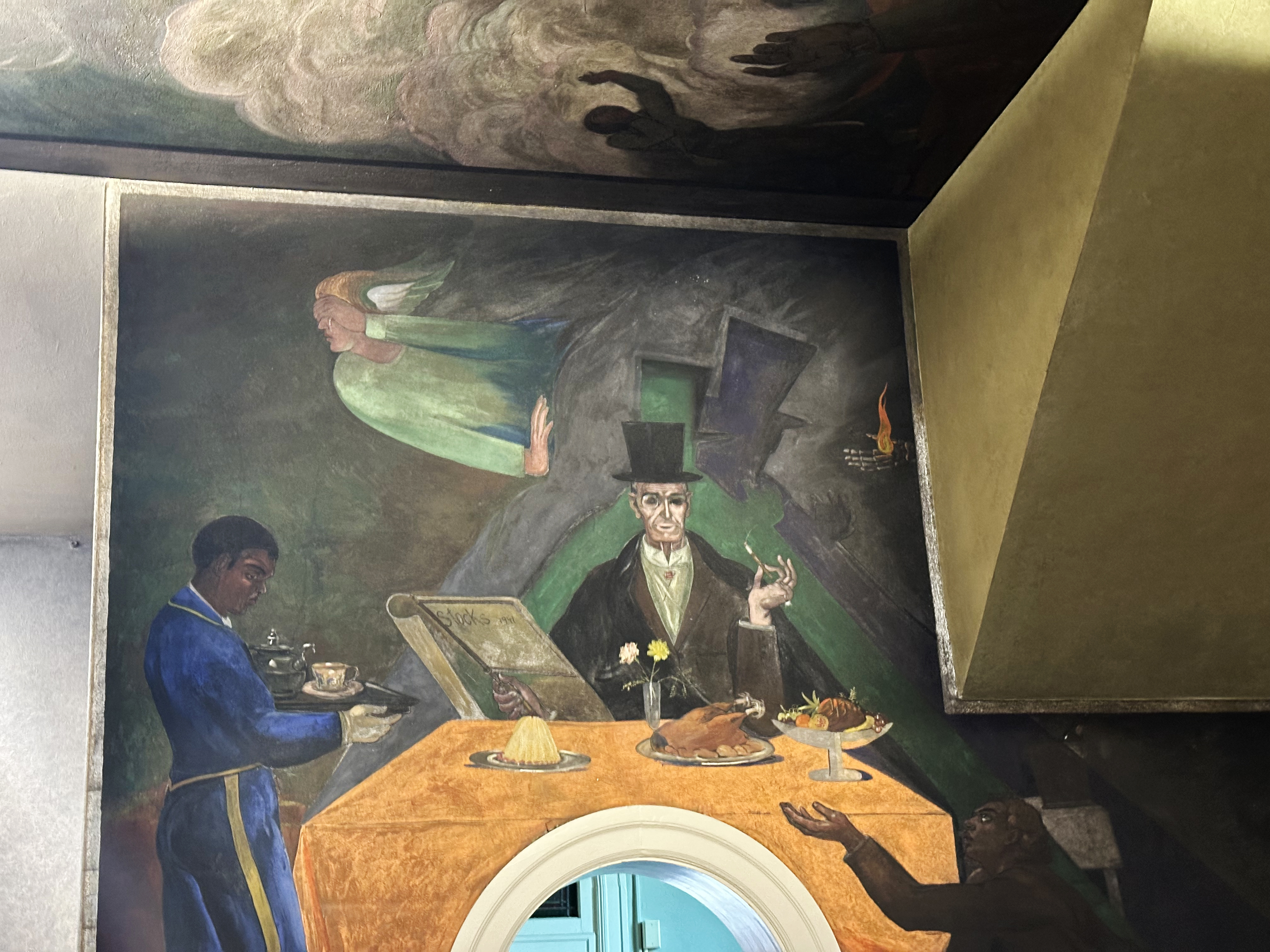
The Capitalist

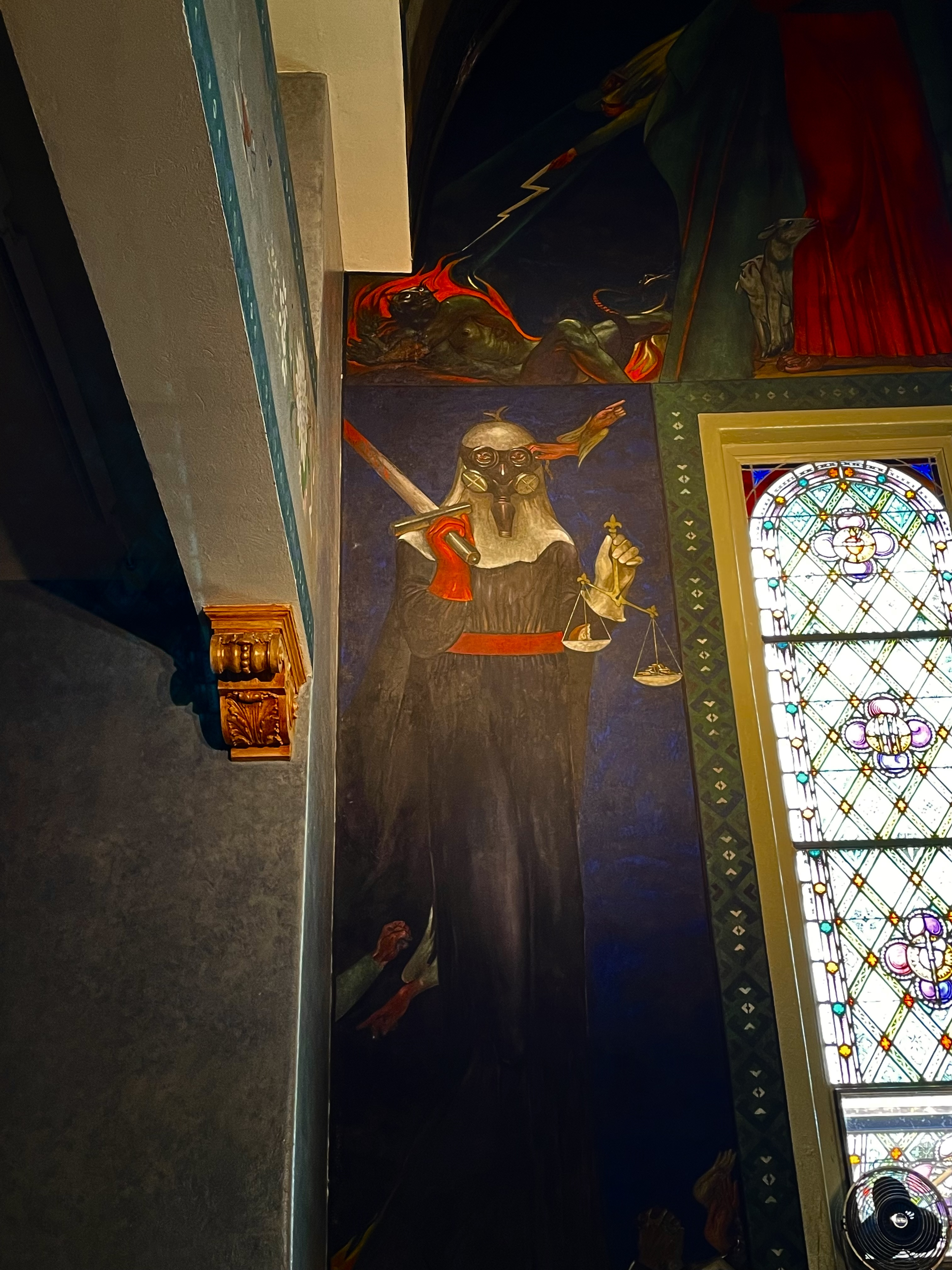
Injustice

== See also ==
- Maxo Vanka
- National Register of Historic Places listings in Allegheny County, Pennsylvania
