= Maksimilijan Vanka =

Croatian-American artist (1889–1963)

Maxo Vanka
- Vanka in 1946
- Born: Maksimilijan Vanka; 11 May 1889; Zagreb, Kingdom of Croatia-Slavonia, Austria-Hungary
- Died: 2 February 1963 (aged 73); Puerto Vallarta, Mexico
- Citizenship: United States
- Known for: Painting

Maksimilijan "Maxo" Vanka (May 11, 1889 – February 2, 1963) was a Croatian and American artist. He is best known for the series of murals he completed in 1937 and 1941 at St. Nicholas Croatian Church in Millvale, Pennsylvania.

== Biography ==
=== Early life ===
Vanka was born in Zagreb in 1889, supposedly the illegitimate son of two Austro-Hungarian noble families. He was raised by a peasant woman, a wet nurse named Dora Jugova, in Hrvatsko Zagorje but returned to Zagreb after completing elementary school.

He studied art under Bela Čikoš Sesija at the College of Arts and Crafts in Zagreb as well as in Brussels with Jean Delville and Constant Montald. During World War I, he served with the Belgian Red Cross, because he was a pacifist and would not serve in the regular army. After the war, he returned to teach at the College of Arts and Crafts, becoming a professor in 1923. He taught composition, drawing and fresco work. He was elected as a corresponding member of the Croatian Academy of Sciences and Arts in 1929. In 1931 he married an American, Margaret Stetten, whom he met while she was traveling in the Balkans with her parents. The couple moved to New York City with their daughter Peggy in 1935.

=== Millvale murals ===
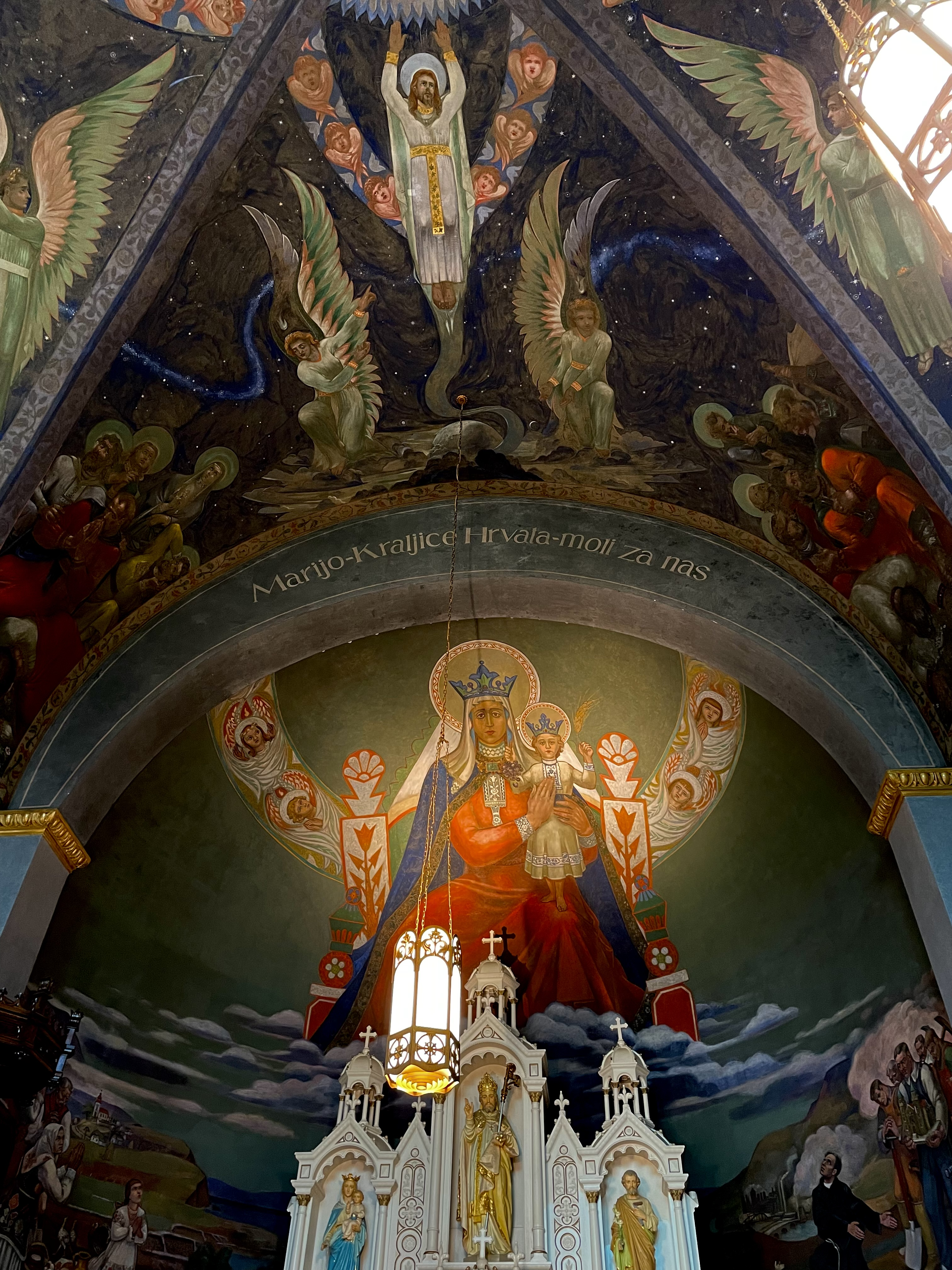
Altar of the St Nicholas Catholic Church in Millvale, PA, USA, painted by Maxo Vanka

After moving to the United States, Vanka exhibited his work in New York and Pittsburgh, but without much financial success. In 1937, his friend Louis Adamic helped him get the commission for what would end up being his most important work, a series of murals for St. Nicholas Church, a Croatian parish in the Pittsburgh suburb of Millvale, Pennsylvania. Working in two campaigns, the first in 1937 and the second in 1941, Vanka painted a total of 25 murals on the apse, walls, and ceiling of the church, covering a total area of approximately 4,500 square feet (420 m^{2}).

Vanka painted the first set of murals from April to June, 1937, working every day until 2 or 3 in the morning. During this time, he became convinced that the church was haunted by a ghostly, black-robed figure, which Adamic later wrote about in a piece for Harper's Magazine titled The Millvale Apparition. Nevertheless, he completed the murals on schedule. Although Vanka had "upset tradition in his introduction of labor scenes... within the sacred precincts of a church", the murals were met with acclaim from the press as well as church officials, and brought Vanka "significant if not prolonged fame."

Vanka was invited back to complete a second set of murals which were dedicated on November 16, 1941. With World War II then raging in Europe, these murals featured much more overtly anti-war subject matter than the earlier ones. With the completion of the full set of murals, the Pittsburgh Press wrote that the artwork would "put [the church] near the top of the 'must list' of places to see in the Pittsburgh district", while the Sun-Telegraph wrote that Vanka and the parish priest, Albert Zagar, were "tossing the dogmas of religious art into the ash-can". Vanka himself described the murals as "my contribution to America".

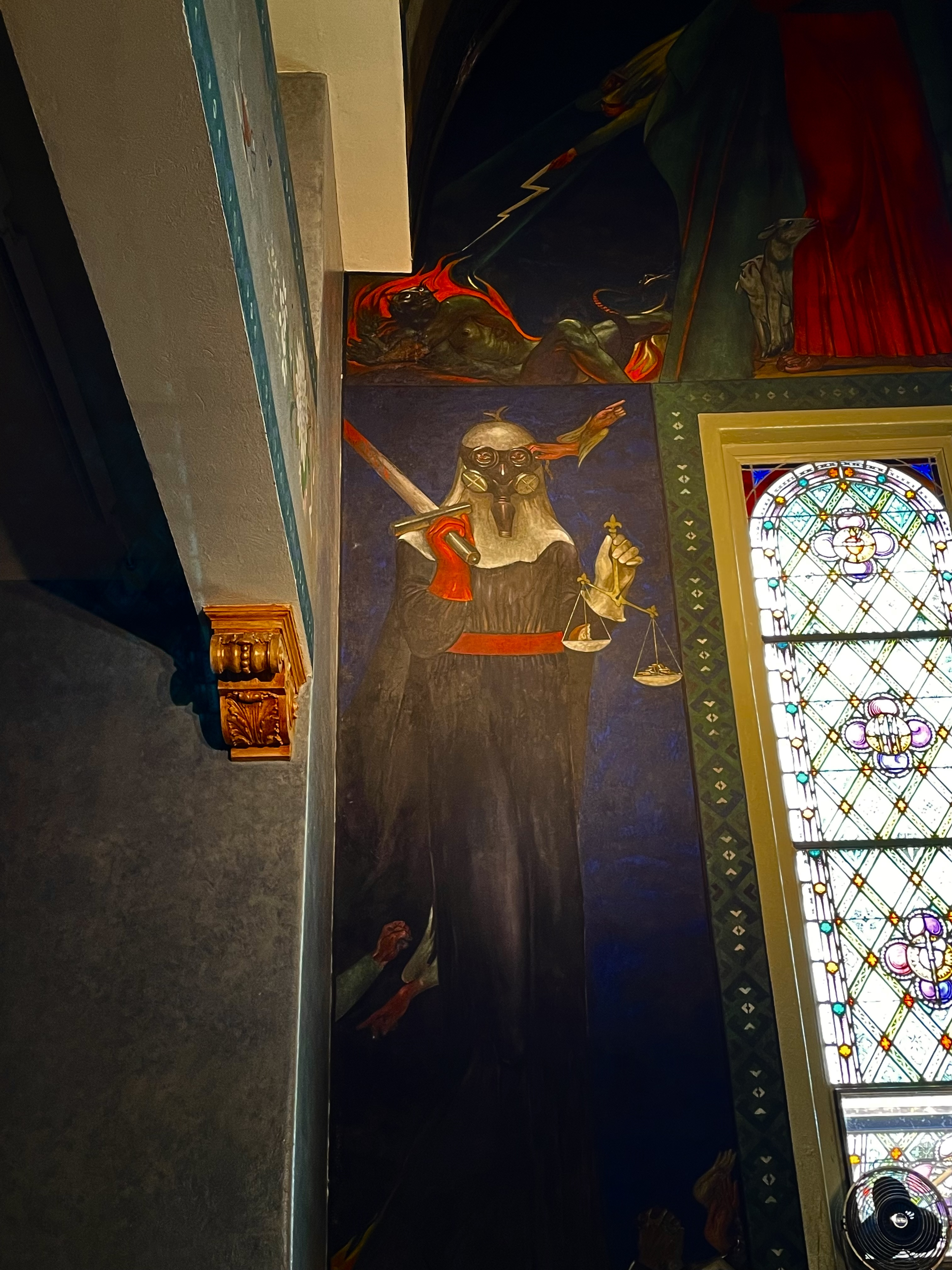
Injustice mural

The subject matter of the murals includes a combination of traditional religious imagery and social themes related to the Croatian American experience, such as war, injustice, and exploitation of workers. Vanka acknowledged traditional church decoration practices dating back to the Byzantine Empire in his placement of Mary, Queen of Heaven, above the altar and depictions of the Ascension of Jesus and the Four Evangelists on the ceiling. Elsewhere, Vanka included scenes from the Old and New Testaments, images of saints, and scenes depicting the Croatian immigrant experience such as Immigrant Mother Raises Her Sons for American Industry, in which a group of Croatian women mourn over a young man killed in a mining accident. Other murals included allegorical depictions of injustice and inequality in America, such as The American Capitalist, in which a wealthy businessman sits before an elaborate meal while ignoring a beggar, and Injustice, which depicts a hooded figure wearing a gas mask and holding a scale in which a loaf of bread is outweighed by gold. Vanka, a committed pacifist, also included strong anti-war imagery, such as a crucified Jesus being pierced by a World War I soldier's bayonet, and the Virgin Mary breaking a soldier's rifle.

=== Later career and death ===
Apart from the Millvale murals, the majority of Vanka's American work consisted of charcoal and pastel drawings, many of which depicted scenes and people he met during his travels, and oil paintings, which were predominantly landscapes and still lifes. Vanka mostly stopped exhibiting his work after World War II, although he did hold a small show consisting of "fruits, flowers, and allegorical landscapes" at the Charles Barzansky gallery in New York in 1957. As a result of this limited exposure, most of his later work is not well known.

Maxo Vanka Property, in Bucks County, Pennsylvania

In his later life, Vanka lived on a farm near Doylestown in Bucks County, Pennsylvania, and taught art appreciation at the National Agricultural College (now Delaware Valley University). He died swimming off the coast of Puerto Vallarta, Mexico, in 1963.

== Legacy ==
In 1968, Vanka's widow and daughter donated 47 of his works to the Croatian Academy of Sciences and Arts. This collection was initially displayed at Vanka's former summer home on the island of Korčula, but was later moved to the Strossmayer Gallery of Old Masters in Zagreb. In 2022, it was announced that the collection would be restored and moved back to Vanka's villa on Korčula.

Vanka and his work were largely forgotten in the United States after his death, but began to attract renewed attention since the 1990s. His first U.S. retrospective was held in 2001 at the James A. Michener Art Museum in Doylestown, Pennsylvania. In 1991, the Society to Preserve the Millvale Murals of Maxo Vanka was founded with the mission to preserve and maintain the murals at St. Nicholas Church.

Vanka was mentioned in several writings by Louis Adamic and was the inspiration for his 1936 novel Cradle of Life: The Story of One Man's Beginnings. The novel tells the story of a man named Rudo Stanka whose early life mirrors Vanka's own. Vanka was also memorialized in Gift to America, a play written in 1981 by Professor David P. Demarest of Carnegie Mellon University.
