= Aspinwall, Pennsylvania =

Borough of Pennsylvania, United States

- Borough
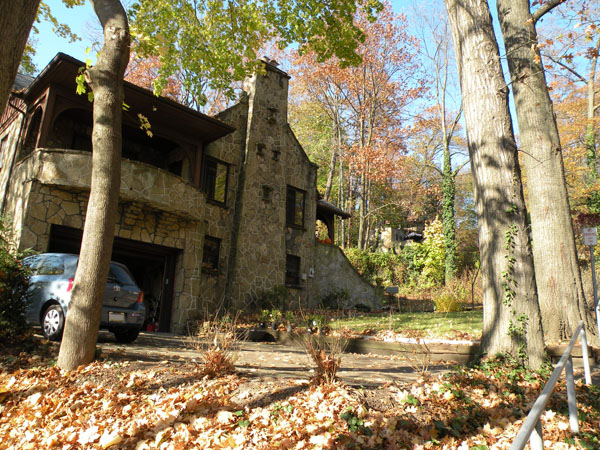
- The Sauer Buildings Historic District located between 607–717 Center Avenue in Aspinwall.
- Motto: The Town That Pride Built
- Location in Allegheny County and the U.S. state of Pennsylvania
- Coordinates: 40°29′35″N 79°54′11″W
- Country: United States
- State: Pennsylvania
- County: Allegheny
- Incorporated: December 28, 1892
- Named for: George Aspinwall

Government
  - Mayor: Joseph Noro (R)

Area
  - Total: 0.39 sq mi (1.00 km^{2})
  - Land: 0.35 sq mi (0.91 km^{2})
  - Water: 0.035 sq mi (0.09 km^{2})
- Elevation: 758 ft (231 m)

Population (2020)
  - Total: 2,916
  - Density: 8,311.8/sq mi (3,209.21/km^{2})
- Time zone: UTC-5 (EST)
  - Summer (DST): UTC-4 (EDT)
- ZIP code: 15215
- Area codes: 412, 724
- FIPS code: 42-03320
- School District: Fox Chapel Area
- Website: https://www.aspinwallpa.gov/

Aspinwall is a borough on the Allegheny River in Allegheny County, Pennsylvania, United States. It is part of the Pittsburgh metropolitan area. The population was 2,916 at the 2020 census.

== History ==
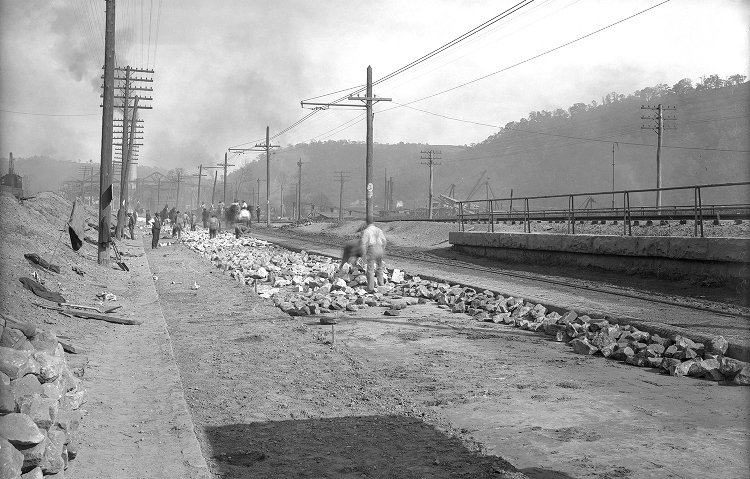
Laying Telford on Freeport Road, Aspinwall, 1908

In the mid-1880s, the area which is now Aspinwall was primarily owned by the descendants of James Ross, but as the steel industry was thriving in Pittsburgh, Henry Warner, superintendent of the Allegheny County Workhouse, had the idea of creating a residential community along the bank of a river.

Warner traveled to New York to discuss the idea with Annie Aspinwall. He purchased 155 acres (0.63 km^{2}) of land from her and formed the Aspinwall Land Company in 1890. Pittsburghers, mostly from the upper-middle class, purchased lots from the 60 available home sites. By 1890, the town had 400 residents, most of whom were young couples with children. The existing government of O'Hara Township was having difficulty providing services to the rapidly growing area and, in 1892, 40 residents of the new community signed a petition requesting incorporation as "The Borough of Aspinwall, a self-governing unit."

Aspinwall was officially incorporated as a borough on December 28, 1892, from O'Hara Township.

Aspinwall was served by Pittsburgh Railways streetcar service 94 Aspinwall from c.1910 until November 12, 1960, when the service was discontinued on the closure of the 62nd Street Sharpsburg Bridge. This was replaced by the Senator Robert D. Fleming Bridge which did not have streetcar tracks.

From 1893 to 1905, Aspinwall developed in three phases, beginning with the area closest to the Allegheny River. On September 25, 1905, a group of Aspinwall residents purchased 200 acres (0.81 km^{2}) from the Delafield Plan and annexed this additional land to the borough.

Early recreational facilities in the borough included tennis courts and water fountains. During World War I, the Patriots Committee of Aspinwall purchased wristwatches from a watch factory in Canton, Ohio, which they presented to the approximately 164 Aspinwall men entering the service. Aspinwall held their own victory parade and memorial service for the soldiers of their borough.

== Geography ==
Aspinwall is located at 40°29′35″N 79°54′11″W. According to the U.S. Census Bureau, the borough has a total area of 0.4 square miles (1.0 km^{2}), of which 0.3 square miles (0.78 km^{2}) is land and 0.04 square miles (0.10 km^{2}) is water. Its average elevation is 758 feet (231 m) above sea level.

=== Surrounding adjacent communities ===
Aspinwall is bordered by Sharpsburg to the west, O'Hara Township to the northwest, north and east, and the northern portion of the Pittsburgh neighborhood Lincoln-Lemington-Belmar to the east. Adjacent to Aspinwall across the Allegheny River to the south are the Pittsburgh neighborhoods of Highland Park and the southern section of Lincoln-Lemington-Belmar.

== Demographics ==
Historical population
Census	Pop.	Note	%±
1900	1,231		—
1910	2,592		110.6%
1920	3,170		22.3%
1930	4,263		34.5%
1940	4,716		10.6%
1950	4,084		−13.4%
1960	3,727		−8.7%
1970	3,541		−5.0%
1980	3,284		−7.3%
1990	2,880		−12.3%
2000	2,960		2.8%
2010	2,801		−5.4%
2020	2,916		4.1%

As of the census of 2000, there were 2,960 people, 1,499 households, and 728 families residing in the borough. The population density was 8,904.9 people per square mile (3,438.2 people/km^{2}). There were 1,584 housing units at an average density of 4,765.3 per square mile (1,839.9/km^{2}). The racial makeup of the borough was 98.11% White, 0.27% African American, 0.03% Native American, 0.91% Asian, 0.17% from other races, and 0.51% from two or more races. Hispanic or Latino of any race were 1.01% of the population.

There were 1,499 households, out of which 18.7% had children under the age of 18 living with them, 38.3% were married couples living together, 8.5% had a female householder with no husband present, and 51.4% were non-families. 46.0% of all households were made up of individuals, and 15.9% had someone living alone who was 65 years of age or older. The average household size was 1.97 and the average family size was 2.84.

In the borough the population was spread out, with 18.3% under the age of 18, 5.3% from 18 to 24, 34.1% from 25 to 44, 23.1% from 45 to 64, and 19.2% who were 65 years of age or older. The median age was 40 years. For every 100 females, there were 76.5 males. For every 100 females age 18 and over, there were 73.4 males.

The median income for a household in the borough was $41,993, and the median income for a family was $58,750. Males had a median income of $45,231 versus $34,180 for females. The per capita income for the borough was $31,344. About 6.6% of families and 5.9% of the population were below the poverty line, including 3.1% of those under age 18 and 10.0% of those age 65 or over.

== Government and politics ==
Presidential Elections Results
Year	Republican	Democratic	Third Parties
2024	30% 562	69% 1,312	1% 24
2020	29% 553	69% 1,322	1% 21
2016	33% 539	66% 1,089	0.1% 11
2012	44% 694	55% 870	1% 25

The municipality is not in the Pittsburgh city limits, but the United States Postal Service allows entities in the borough to use either "Aspinwall, Pennsylvania" or "Pittsburgh, Pennsylvania" in their mailing addresses, as the borough has been on a historical mailing route involving Pittsburgh.

== Public safety ==
The Aspinwall Police Department (2400 units) is the primary law enforcement agency in the borough. The police station is located within the municipal building on Commercial Ave in the business district.

Fire suppression and rescue services are provided by the Aspinwall Volunteer Fire Department (Station 102) from two fire stations. The department's main station is located within the municipal building with the entrance being located on 1st St. The substation is located on 12th St at the intersection with Center Ave.

Emergency medical services for the borough are provided by Foxwall EMS (Station 140). Foxwall EMS is headquartered on Hemlock Hollow Road in Fox Chapel. Foxwall also has two bicycles equipped with medical supplies which are used to provide quick response services in the lower portion of the borough.

== Education ==
The school district is Fox Chapel Area School District.

== Notable people ==
- Robert Lepper, artist and Carnegie Mellon University professor
- Chris Deluzio, U.S. congressman

Preceded by Penn Hills	Bordering communities of Pittsburgh	Succeeded by Sharpsburg
