= Neill Log House =

- Neill (Neal) Log House
- U.S. Historic district – Contributing property
- Pittsburgh Landmark – PHLF
- Pittsburgh Historic Designation
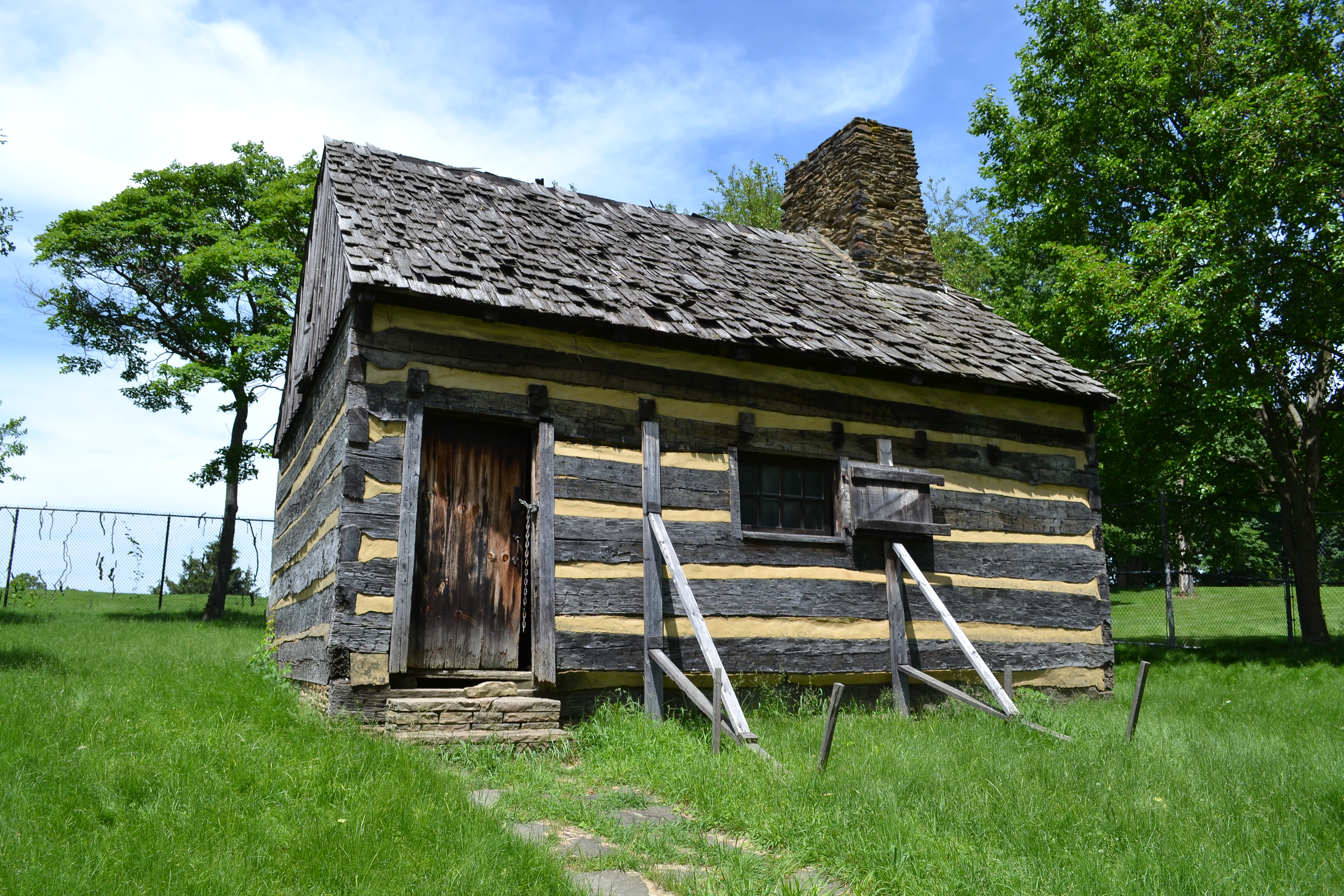
- Neill (Neal) Log House in June 2019

- Location within Pittsburgh
- Location: East Circuit Road near Serpentine Drive in Schenley Park, Pittsburgh, Pennsylvania
- Coordinates: 40.435847°N 79.935606°W
- Built: ca. 1795
- Part of: Schenley Park Historic District (ID85003506)

Significant dates
- Designated CP: November 13, 1985
- Designated PHLF: 1970
- Designated CPHS: February 28, 1977

The Neill Log House (also spelled Neal) is a historic log cabin in Schenley Park in Pittsburgh, Pennsylvania, United States.

The house was built during the second half of the 18th century and has been most commonly attributed to Robert Neill (Neal), with an estimated construction date possibly anywhere from 1765 to 1795. This estimate is based on architectural evidence as well as the large increase in value of the land during Neill's period of ownership which would indicate he made substantial improvements. However, the earlier date of 1765 claimed in some sources would associate the building with an earlier landowner, Ambrose Newton. In 2024, a dendrochronology study determined that the beam over the fireplace, believed to be original to the house's construction, was dated to be from 1795, which was the date that Robert Neal sold the cabin to John Reed. It is known by records that Robert Neal purchased the land in 1779 and sold the cabin and land in 1795. Extrapolation of the known dates of Robert Neal's purchase and date the property was sold and the large increase in value during Robert Neal's ownership indicating he made substantial improvements likely mean it may have been built by him between 1779 and 1794. These dates coincide with the records from the Western Pennsylvania Historical Society, Indiana County Historical Society and Revolutionary War records, showing Robert and his brothers William and John, moving from Central Pennsylvania to Western Pennsylvania around 1780, after serving in the Revolutionary War.

The Neill (Neal) Log House is the oldest existing residential structure (house) in Pittsburgh. Other existing buildings such as the Old Stone Tavern built in 1756 (not confirmed) and the Fort Pitt Block House built in 1764 are not residential structures. The Pittsburgh History and Landmarks Foundation placed a Historic Landmark Plaque on the building in 1970. In 1977, it was named a City of Pittsburgh Designated Historic Structure. It is part of Schenley Park U.S. Historic District.

== Naming ==
Prior to 1969, the structure was generally known as the Neal house. The name of Robert Neal and his family was spelled various ways in official documents, including Neal, Neil, but in only one document Neill. In 1969, Pittsburgh History and Landmarks Foundation president Charles Covert Arensberg wrote an article in Western Pennsylvania History titled "The spelling of Robert Neill who built the Neill Log House in Schenley Park" in which he contended that "Neill" should be considered the proper spelling, based on the spelling of his daughter's last name on only one document. This article was used to change the name of the building to Neill. Recently sources and documents have shown the last name to be Neal, Neel, Niel, or Neil, with the former being the most common. This has prompted a discussion with the members of the Squirrel Hill Historical Society and Friends of the Neill Log House to consider applying to the city revert the name back to the original name.

During the reconstruction of the log house in 1969, Pittsburgh History & Landmark Foundation (PHLF) initially put a sign by the house identifying it as “The Neal Log House.” Shortly afterward, PHLF changed the spelling to Neill, based on research published by Charles Covert Arensberg, then-president of PHLF, in a 1969 article in Western Pennsylvania History magazine, the official publication of the Historical Society of Western Pennsylvania, now the Heinz History Center. The article cites the variations of the spelling of Robert's last name, appearing in various 18th century documents as Neal, Neill, Neel, and Neil, in many cases because those recording his name spelled it the way they chose. Arensberg settled on Neill because of several uses of that spelling, including the 1795 deed of sale of his house, his Last Will and Testament (in which he marked an X next to the spelling “Neill"), and lastly, an 1825 deed from “The Estate of Robert Neill” in which his daughter did also. In research that appears on the Neill Log House page of the Squirrel Hill Historical Society (SHHS) website, squirrelhillhistory.org, SHHS acknowledges that Neal, Neil, and Neel are the most commonly used in deeds, wills, census records and historical records regarding the family. Newspaper articles from 1914 and 1926 use the name Neal. The house was called the Neal House until PHLF settled on the Neill spelling based on Arensberg's research. The position of Friends of Neill Log House (FONLH), the organization managing the current restoration, is to continue using “Neill Log House” as decided by PHLF in 1969.

== History ==
The site of the Neill (Neal) house was part of a 262-acre (106 ha) tract owned by Ambrose Newton. Newton was a soldier at Fort Pitt and was listed as a resident of Pittsburgh's "upper town" in a 1761 census. After the Treaty of Fort Stanwix nullified the Iroquois Confederacy's legal title to southwestern Pennsylvania, the land was opened to settlers. Newton purchased the Highland tract around 1769. When he died in 1773, the property was sold for 63 pounds, 9 shillings. The Martin log house, part of the same tract, has also been possibly attributed to Newton.

The land came into the possession of Robert Neal sometime around 1779. The purchase price was listed as 34 pounds, 8 shilling. Robert Neal applied for a warrant for the land in 1785. In 1787, the land warrant was "returned", meaning accepted and he was granted a land patent from the Commonwealth of Pennsylvania and called his tract of land "The Highlands". The property is about four miles from Fort Pitt, where the family could go for protection. The house appears on a 1790 road survey. Tax records indicate Robert Neal owned two horses and three cows in addition to his land. He was a farmer and surveyor as were his brothers and father. The site of the log house may have been chosen for its proximity to water, as a map from 1872 shows a stream, probably fed by a natural spring, running alongside the house into Panther Hollow. This is likely the same water source that fed the Catahecassa Spring (now disused) which sits down the hill from the Neill house. The house was also near Nemacolin's Trail, which was one of the main routes between Pittsburgh and the east coast.

Robert Neal lived in the house with his wife Elizabeth (née Irwin) Neal, their son John and their five daughters, Nancy; Mary, Elizabeth, Jean and Martha. There was also possibly a second son. Robert was the son of John and Margaret Neal, who emigrated from Ulster Ireland and on June 8, 1738, purchased 200 acres of land in Paxtang Township, Lancaster County Pennsylvania (now Dauphin County) near Harrisburg Pennsylvania, for “fifteen pounds and ten shillings for each hundred acres” which they called “Neal’s Garden”. John and Margaret had eight children including Robert, William, John, James, Margaret, Jean, Eleanor, and Agnes. Robert purchased the land in Pittsburgh in what is now Schenley Park developing a wagon trade route along the Nemacolin Indian Trail (Braddock's Road) from Pittsburgh to Philadelphia, with his father's homestead outside of Harrisburg PA as one of the resting points. Robert and his family lived on the land until 1795, at which time they moved to what is now downtown Pittsburgh.

In 1795, Robert Neal sold the land to John Reed for a price reported as either 360 pounds, 5 shillings, or 365 pounds, 5 shillings. The large increase in the value of the property during Neill's ownership has been cited as evidence that the log house was most likely constructed during this period. Reed added a second parcel known as the Bedford tract to the property and then sold it to Brentnall Robbins in 1804. In 1813, military officer and businessman James O'Hara bought the tract from Robbins. The land was eventually inherited by O'Hara's granddaughter Mary Schenley, who donated it to the city of Pittsburgh in 1889 to create Schenley Park. The section of the park near the log house became a golf course, with the building itself being repurposed as a maintenance shed.

=== Connection with the Lewis and Clark Expedition ===
The Neill (Neal) log house is profiled on the Lewis and Clark National Historic Trail Experience website created by the National Park Service to highlight noteworthy places along the route of the 1804–06 Lewis and Clark Expedition. The historic connection between the Neal Log House and Lewis and Clark's Expedition is believed to have taken place in May 1803, when Meriwether Lewis traveled to Pittsburgh to launch the keelboat he had constructed up-river from Pittsburgh. Several months later, he began his trip down the Ohio River from the Point, the confluence of the Three Rivers in Pittsburgh and early Gateway to the West. From here, Lewis traveled to the Falls of the Ohio at Clarksville, Indiana, across from Louisville, Kentucky. Soon after, he met up with William Clark. It is said that “When they shook hands in Clarksville, the Lewis and Clark Expedition began.” More crew members were added and they traveled to winter quarters outside of St. Louis, in final preparation to journey west. This was all after earlier preparation on the rivers of Pittsburgh, where their keelboat was first constructed and launched. May 1803 was Lewis’ second trip to Pittsburgh, having traveled earlier as a young Virginian volunteer to put-down the Whiskey Rebellion. On both trips, he journeyed from Maryland to Pittsburgh on the ancient Nemacolin Indian Trail, later called Braddock's Road. There is also evidence that Lewis later traveled with two wagons, by the Neal Log House, on his last 4 miles overland to the Point. Early travelers on the Nemacolin Trail through what is now Schenley Park would water their horses at Snyder's Springs, source of the historic Catahecassa Fountain at the Neal Log House.

=== First restoration ===
In 1935, the house was surveyed by Charles Morse Stotz for the Historic American Buildings Survey (HABS). Stotz noted that the roof, gables, and floor had been replaced and that the whole building was "in an extreme state of dilapidation." In the late 1960s, the Pittsburgh History and Landmarks Foundation (PHLF) was seeking funding to restore the Neill house and open it to the public. Before the project was able to get started, one end of the house collapsed in August, 1967. PHLF was then able to secure a $50,000 grant from the Richard King Mellon Foundation to help rebuild the structure.

Beginning in summer, 1969, the house was rebuilt as authentically as possible. Stotz, Hess & MacLachlan were the architects for the project. The building was disassembled and each piece was numbered. The house was then rebuilt, replacing the rotted wood with new logs which were hand-cut and aged to match the originals. Original wood was also reused where possible. The restoration team used period-correct techniques as much as possible, including attaching the rafters with wooden pegs and chinking the walls by hand. Modern electrical and heating systems were also installed, though designed to be inconspicuous. The Department of Archaeology of Carnegie Institute under the direction of Kirk Wilson conducted an archaeological dig of the site that turned up 19,000 artifacts, now in the collection of Carnegie Museum.

=== Second restoration ===
The log house was reconstructed a second time in 2023–24. The house was lifted in order to replace all four sill logs, which had rotted. The restoration also included replacing the roof, repointing the masonry, replacing the chinking, and securing door and window openings to prevent animals from entering. The house currently sits preserved in Schenley Park with a fence around it (though it is open to the public periodically).The log house is also featured on the cover of A Guidebook To Historic Western Pennsylvania by Helene Smith and George Swetnam.

== Architecture ==
Measured drawing of the Neill house created for the Historic American Buildings Survey (HABS) in 1935

The Neill house is a one-story, gable-roofed building constructed from hewn oak logs on a fieldstone foundation. It contains a single ground-floor room with a loft. Architectural historian Charles Morse Stotz wrote that the house is "of typical Pennsylvania type log construction, with the corners carefully notched together and chinked with stone and clay," also noting that the "shaped and beveled projecting ends of the roof rafters are worthy of especial notice."

Most of the logs have been replaced since the house was originally built, but were cut to match the originals. Some of the original logs were reused during the 1969 reconstruction, but not necessarily in the same places. The roof, gables, joists, and floor have also been replaced. The house is held together by means of notches and pegs rather than nails and the floor is constructed from split logs, known as puncheons, with the flat surface oriented upward. The loft was originally accessed by a ladder, but stairs were added in 1969.

The house has a fieldstone chimney which is positioned inside the exterior walls and protrudes through the roof. This arrangement was somewhat unusual, as it was more typical for log cabins to have the chimney built on the outside. Another unusual feature is that the chimney has two separate flues which are connected to two side-by-side fireplaces, one large and one small. According to the Squirrel Hill Historical Society, the main fireplace was probably for cooking, while the smaller fireplace to the left could have been used during the night in order to save firewood. The fireplaces and chimney are original and have never been disassembled. The lintel beam over the fireplace, which was dated to 1795, is also original.

There is at least one small "loophole" window, about 1 foot (0.30 m) high by 2 feet (0.61 m) wide, on the east side of the house. The Craftsman magazine reported that this type of window was used as "constant danger of attack by Indians compelled the settler to build for defense as well as comfort." Most log houses in the area later had their windows enlarged, making the Neill house example noteworthy. Another window on the front of the house was indeed enlarged at one point.

== Historical importance ==
The Neill (Neal) Log House is historically important due to the fact that it is one of only a few eighteenth-century structures remaining in Pittsburgh and the oldest existing residential structure (house) in Pittsburgh. Interestingly, of these, three others are in or near Squirrel Hill. They include the Martin log cabin on Overlook Drive in Schenley Park (1769–1774), also built by Ambrose Newton; the Woods house at 4604 Monongahela Avenue in Hazelwood (1790); and the house that was once a stagecoach stop at 423 Kaercher Street in Greenfield (1800). The house's connection with the Lewis and Clark expedition is also of historical importance. As well as the 19,000 artifacts, found on site, now in the collection of Carnegie Museum.
