= General O'Hara =

General O'Hara may refer to:

- Charles O'Hara (1740–1802) was a British Army general
- James O'Hara (quartermaster) (c. 1752–1819), Continental Army quartermaster general
- James O'Hara, 2nd Baron Tyrawley (1682–1774), British Army general
