= Schenley Bridge =

Bridge in Pittsburgh, Pennsylvania

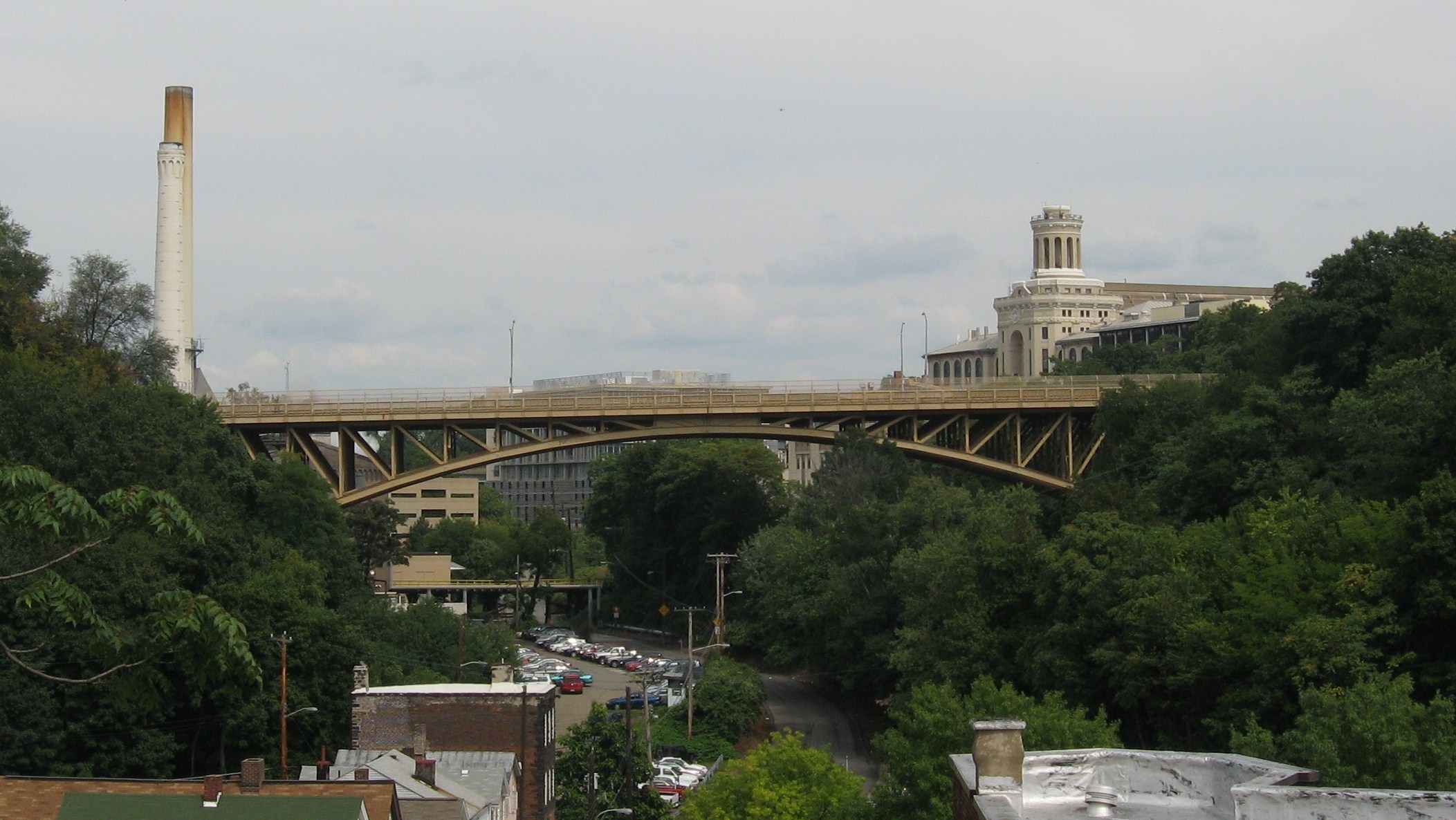
- Schenley Bridge, as viewed from South Oakland.
- Coordinates: 40°26′29″N 79°56′57″W
- Locale: Pittsburgh, Pennsylvania

Pittsburgh Historic Designation
- Type: Structure
- Designated: July 26, 2002

Pittsburgh Landmark – PHLF
- Designated: 2001

The Schenley Bridge is a steel three-hinged deck arch bridge spanning Junction Hollow in Pittsburgh, Pennsylvania. It carries Schenley Drive between Oakland on the west and the main part of Schenley Park on the east, connecting Schenley Plaza, the Carnegie Institute, and the Frick Fine Arts Building with Frew Street, Flagstaff Hill, and Phipps Conservatory. The bridge spans 620 feet (190 m) and arches 120 feet (37 m) above the hollow.

The bridge was completed in 1897 as part of the main entrance to Schenley Park. It replaced a temporary structure by the same name dating from 1890, a year after the park opened. Construction of the Schenley Bridge was roughly contemporaneous with that of the nearby Panther Hollow Bridge, and the two bridges are very similar in design.

== History ==
In 1890, the year after Pittsburgh received the land for Schenley Park, a temporary trestle was constructed across the ravine known as Junction Hollow to provide access from Oakland. This bridge was widely perceived to be unsafe and was the cause of multiple panics when large crowds of people attending the park's annual Fourth of July celebration became convinced the bridge was collapsing. The bridge was also damaged in the fire that destroyed the nearby Schenley Park Casino in 1896.

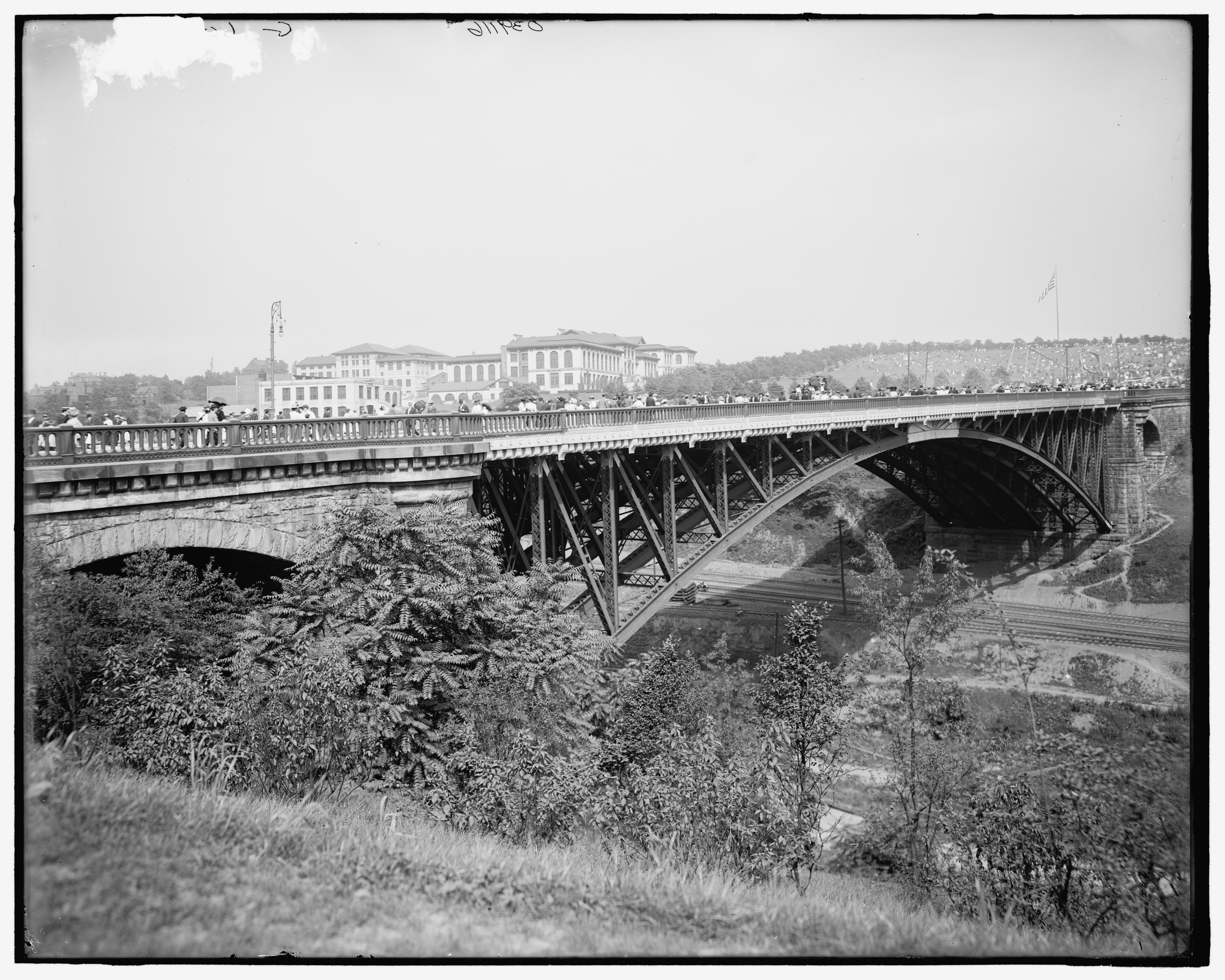
Schenley Bridge as it appeared c. 1900

In 1896, the city's Director of Public Works, Edward Manning Bigelow, announced plans for a new, permanent park entrance featuring two new bridges, the present Schenley Bridge over Junction Hollow and a smaller stone bridge over St. Pierre Hollow. The stone bridge was later buried when the hollow was filled in to build Schenley Plaza. Construction of the Schenley Bridge began in July 1896 and it was completed in November 1897, though the approaches were not finished. The bridge was first opened to the public for the Fourth of July celebration in 1898.

Contrasting the new bridge with the old, the Pittsburgh Post wrote, "That huge iron arch, curving above the railroad and those heavy stone supports will never tremble beneath the weight of all the people who can pack themselves upon it, even should they be piled layer upon layer."

Bigelow originally planned to have the old Schenley Bridge moved to the end of Wilmot Street (now Boulevard of the Allies) to provide an entrance to the park from South Oakland; however, the structure was ultimately sold for scrap instead. The proposed location is now the site of the Charles Anderson Memorial Bridge.

== In popular culture ==
The Schenley Bridge and a boiler plant dubbed the Cloud Factory, sited just northeast of the bridge's Oakland abutment, were settings in The Mysteries of Pittsburgh, the 1988 debut novel by the Pulitzer Prize-winning writer Michael Chabon.

Starting in the 2010s, a large number of love padlocks have been placed on the bridge. Along with the Three Sisters bridges, the Schenley Bridge is one of the locations in Pittsburgh most strongly associated with this practice.

== Gallery ==
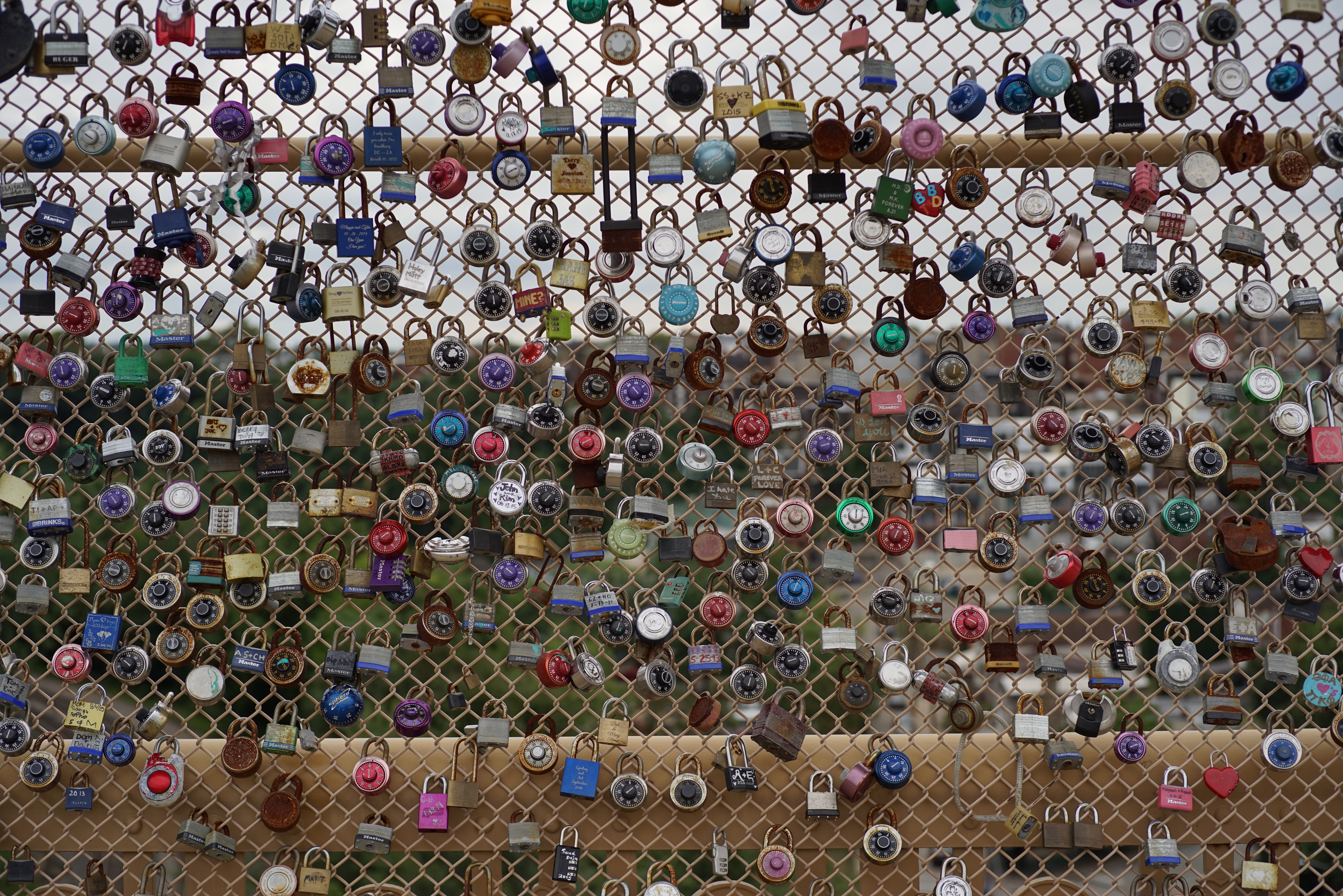
Love locks on the Schenley Bridge

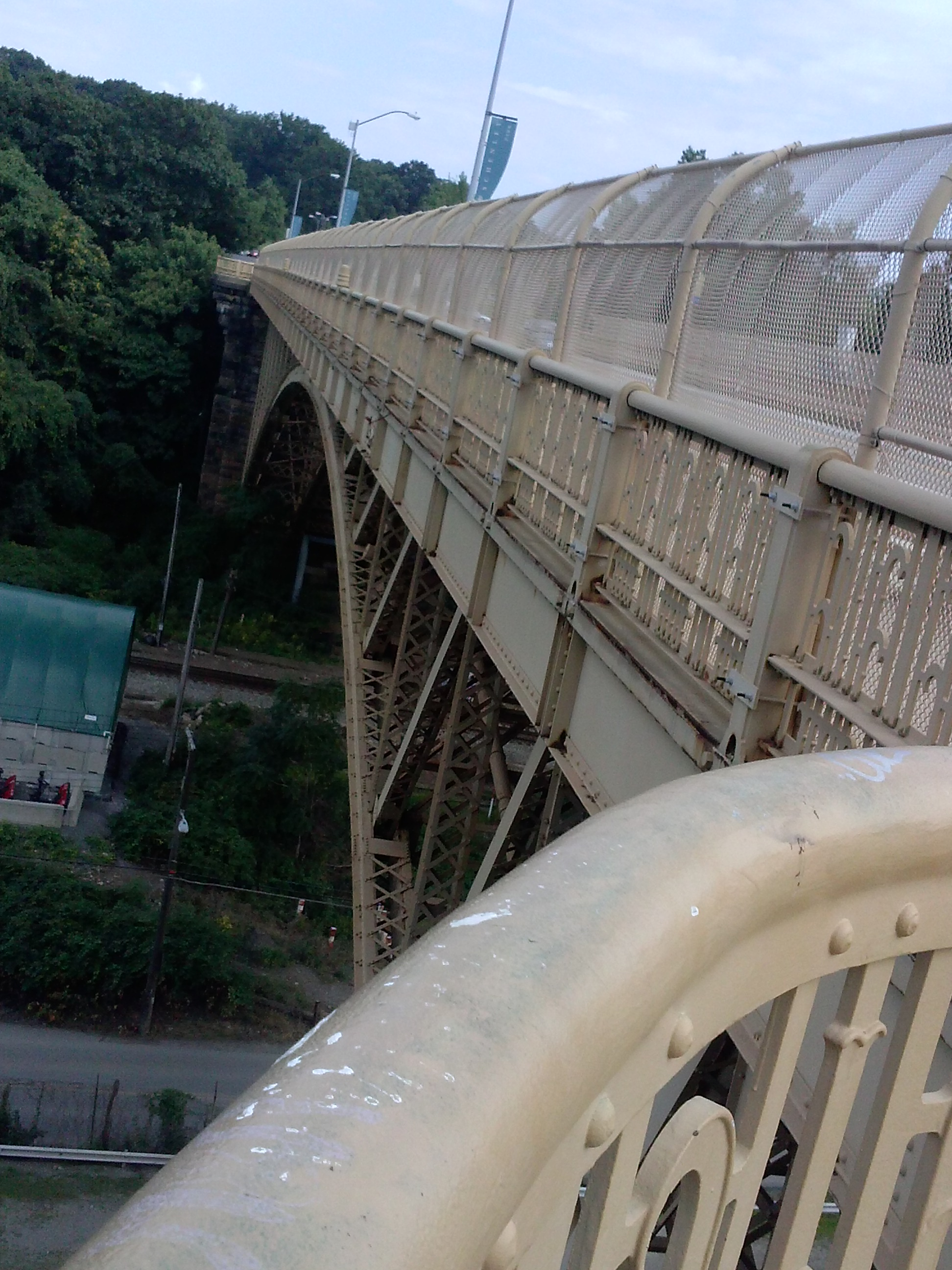
View of Schenley Bridge from one of its outlooks

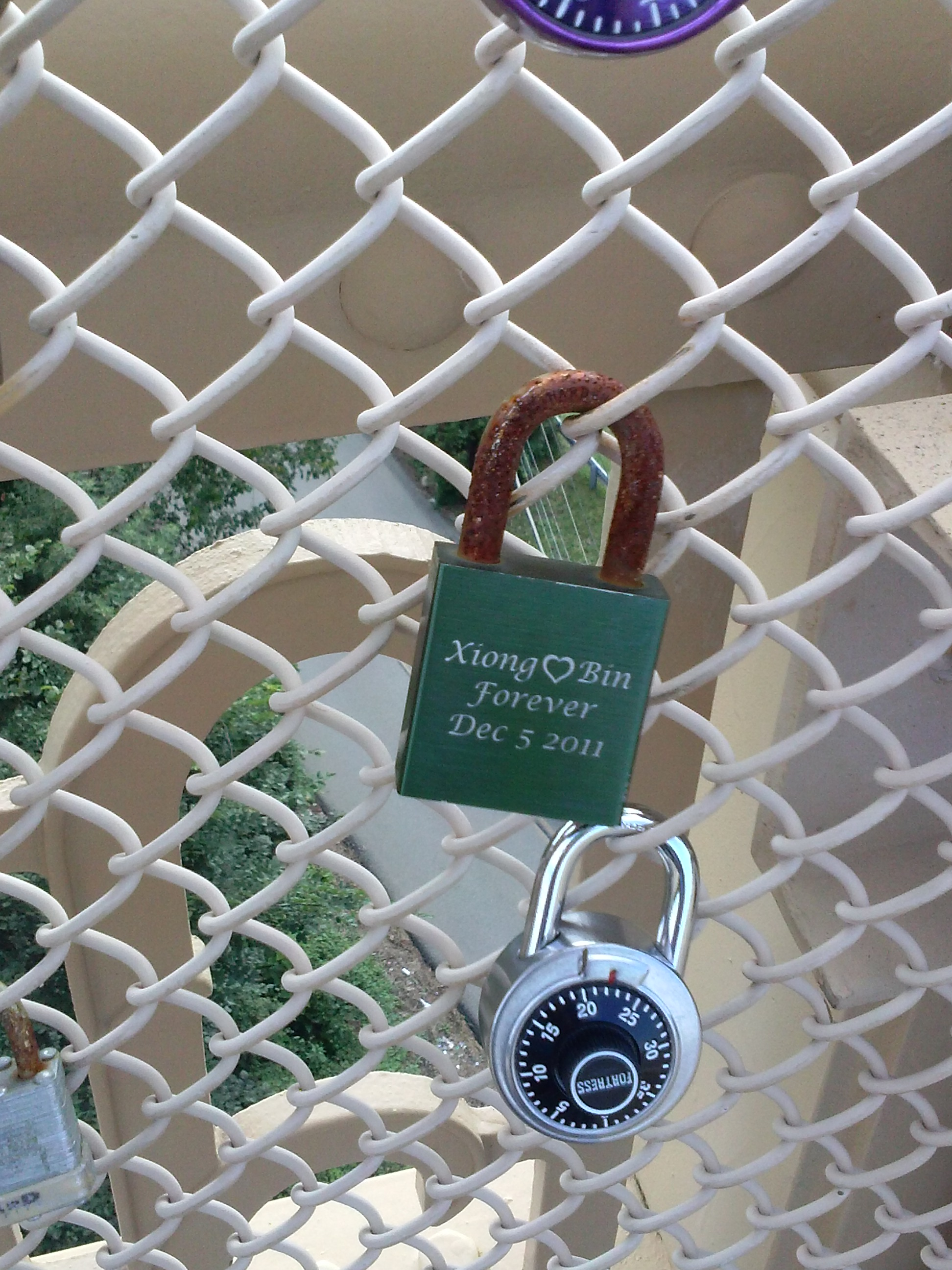
Close-up of one of the lovelocks
