= Colonel Croghan =

Colonel Croghan may refer to:

- George Croghan (c. 1718—1782), an American fur trader
- William Croghan Jr., the father of Mary Schenley
- George Croghan (1791—1849), a soldier in the US Army
