= Junction Hollow =

Valley in Pittsburgh, Pennsylvania

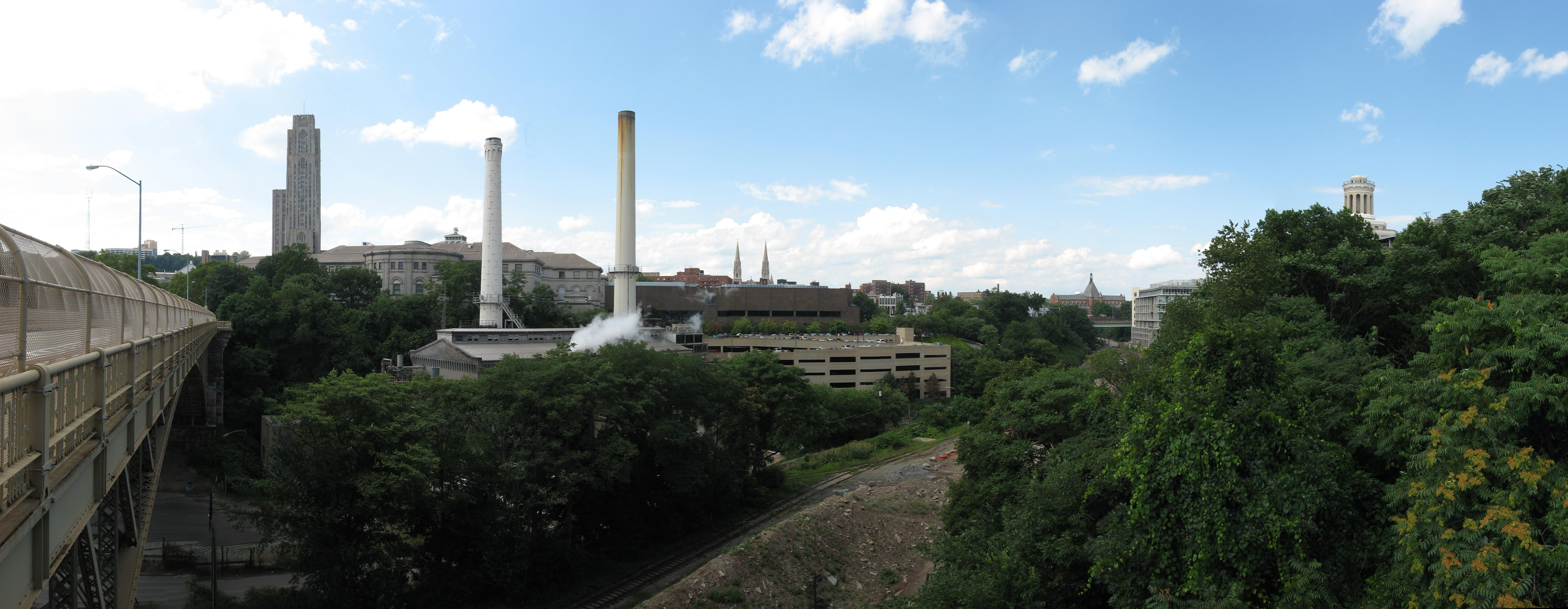
- Junction Hollow viewed from the Schenley Bridge. From left to right, the Cathedral of Learning, Carnegie Institute, Bellefield Boiler Plant, the dual bell towers of St. Paul's Cathedral, Central Catholic High School, and Hamerschlag Hall can be seen.
- Length: 2 1/2 miles (4.0 km) North-South
- Depth: 150 feet (46 m)

Geography
- Location: Schenley Park, Pittsburgh, Pennsylvania, USA
- Population centers: Panther Hollow
- Coordinates: 40.442946°N 79.947544°W
- Traversed by: Pittsburgh Junction Railroad, Boundary Street
- Rivers: Four Mile Run
- Interactive map of Junction Hollow

Junction Hollow is a small wooded valley bordering the west flanks of Schenley Park and the campus of Carnegie Mellon University and the southern edge of the University of Pittsburgh's campus in Pittsburgh, Pennsylvania.

The 150-foot-deep (46 m) valley runs south to north approximately 2 1/2 miles (4.0 km). It begins where Four Mile Run empties into the Monongahela River and runs through the neighborhood of Four Mile Run north into Oakland along Schenley Park, Carnegie Mellon, and the Carnegie Museums of Pittsburgh, and ends at Neville Street behind Central Catholic High School. It is spanned by four major bridges; from north to south they are the Forbes Avenue Bridge, Schenley Bridge, Charles Anderson Memorial Bridge, and Frazier Street Bridge.

Junction Hollow is often confused for Panther Hollow, which at Panther Hollow Lake veers off from it to the northeast into the park.

== History ==
Junction Hollow is named for the Pittsburgh Junction Railroad, which first laid tracks there in the 1880s, and the idea of a Junction Hollow spur line was to divert rail traffic north through Schenley Tunnel (beneath Neville Street) to a rail yard along the Allegheny River, thus avoiding rail congestion in Downtown.

Prior to the railroad the area was known as the Four Mile Run Valley, for its stream that was named on account of its distance from The Point. Today the stream is piped underground to the river.

In the 1950s and 1960s planners created a grand proposal to fill the hollow with a research complex extending from the University of Pittsburgh and Carnegie Mellon University to the river, but it was never realized.

Since the 1990s, the Eliza Furnace Trail extends into the hollow, where it is called Junction Hollow Trail.

== See also ==
- Four Mile Run
