= Panther Hollow Bridge =

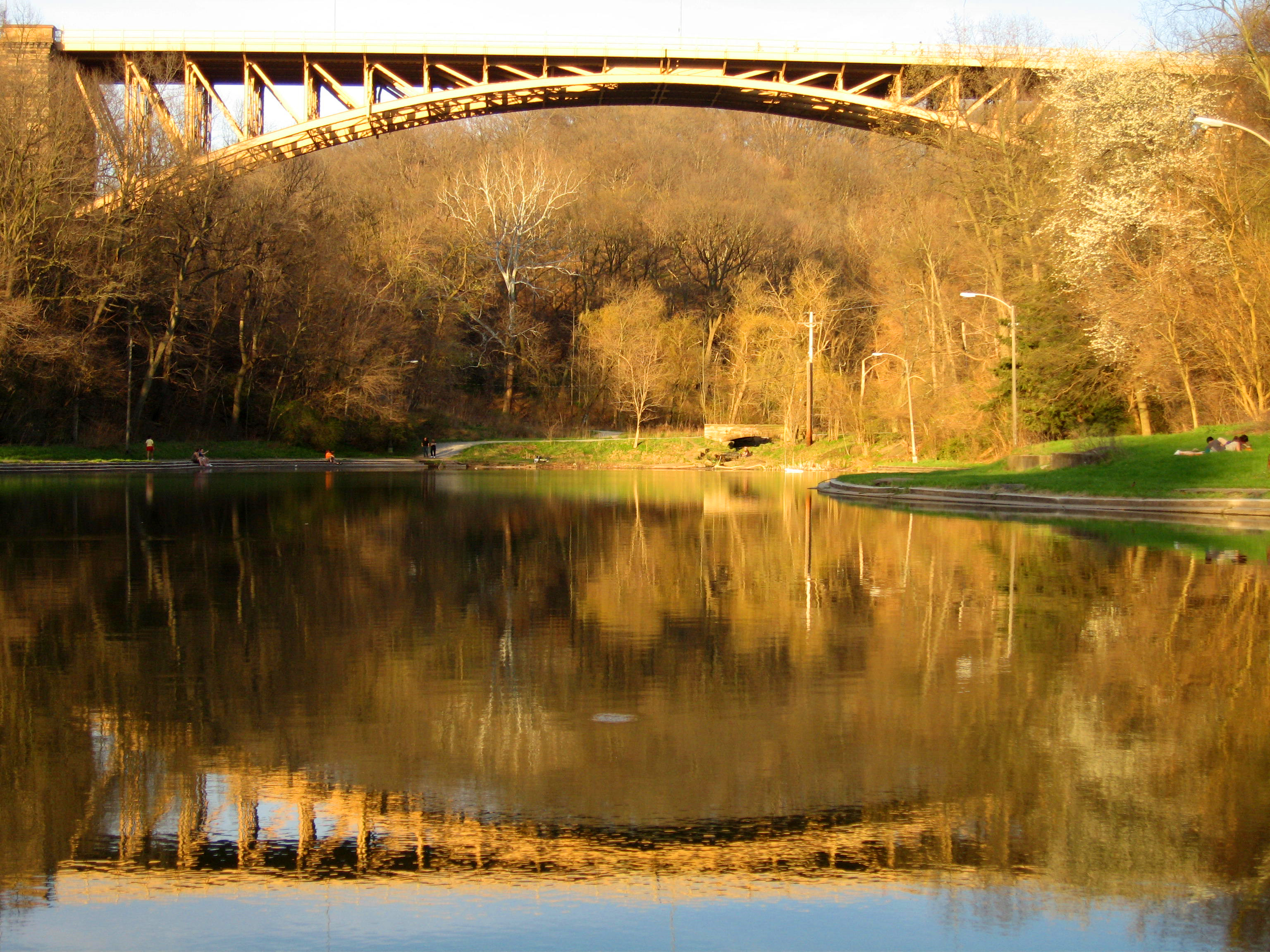
- Panther Hollow Bridge from Panther Hollow Lake in Schenley Park.
- Coordinates: 40°26′13″N 79°56′48″W
- Crosses: Panther Hollow
- Locale: Pittsburgh, Pennsylvania

Pittsburgh Historic Designation
- Type: Structure
- Designated: July 26, 2002

Pittsburgh Landmark – PHLF
- Designated: 2000

Location
- Interactive map of Panther Hollow Bridge

The Panther Hollow Bridge is an American steel, three-hinged, deck arch bridge that carries Panther Hollow Road over Panther Hollow in Schenley Park in Pittsburgh, Pennsylvania.

== Notable features ==
One of the four panther sculptures by Moretti at the ends of Panther Hollow Bridge

This bridge, which is located in the city's Oakland district, has a main span of 360 feet (110 m), total length 620 feet (190 m), and arches 120 feet (37 m) above the hollow. It was built between 1895 and 1896, roughly contemporaneously with the nearby Schenley Bridge. Panther Hollow Bridge may be easily distinguished by its monumental bronze sculptures by Giuseppe Moretti of four panthers, crouching as sentinels, on each bridge corner. The bridge also lacks the chain link type of fencing that is installed on the Schenley Bridge.

Panther Hollow Lake, a recreation spot, lies just west of the bridge.

== History ==
The Panther Hollow Bridge was one of the many Schenley Park improvements completed during the tenure of Pittsburgh director of public works Edward Manning Bigelow. Construction began in August 1895 and the bridge was opened to vehicular traffic in November 1896.

The four bronze panthers were added in 1897. They were sculpted by Giuseppe Moretti and cast by the Gorham Manufacturing Company in Providence, Rhode Island. Only two of the panthers were dedicated on the Fourth of July in 1897, as the other two were not delivered in time for the ceremony.

The bridge was rehabilitated 1999. In October 2024 it was closed "amid an abundance of caution" due to the deterioration on at least one of the four steel trusses holding it up. A $2.23 million repair project started in January 2026 and the bridge reopened that August.

== See also ==
- List of bridges documented by the Historic American Engineering Record in Pennsylvania
