= Catahecassa (Snyder) Spring =

Spring in Pittsburgh, Pennsylvania, US

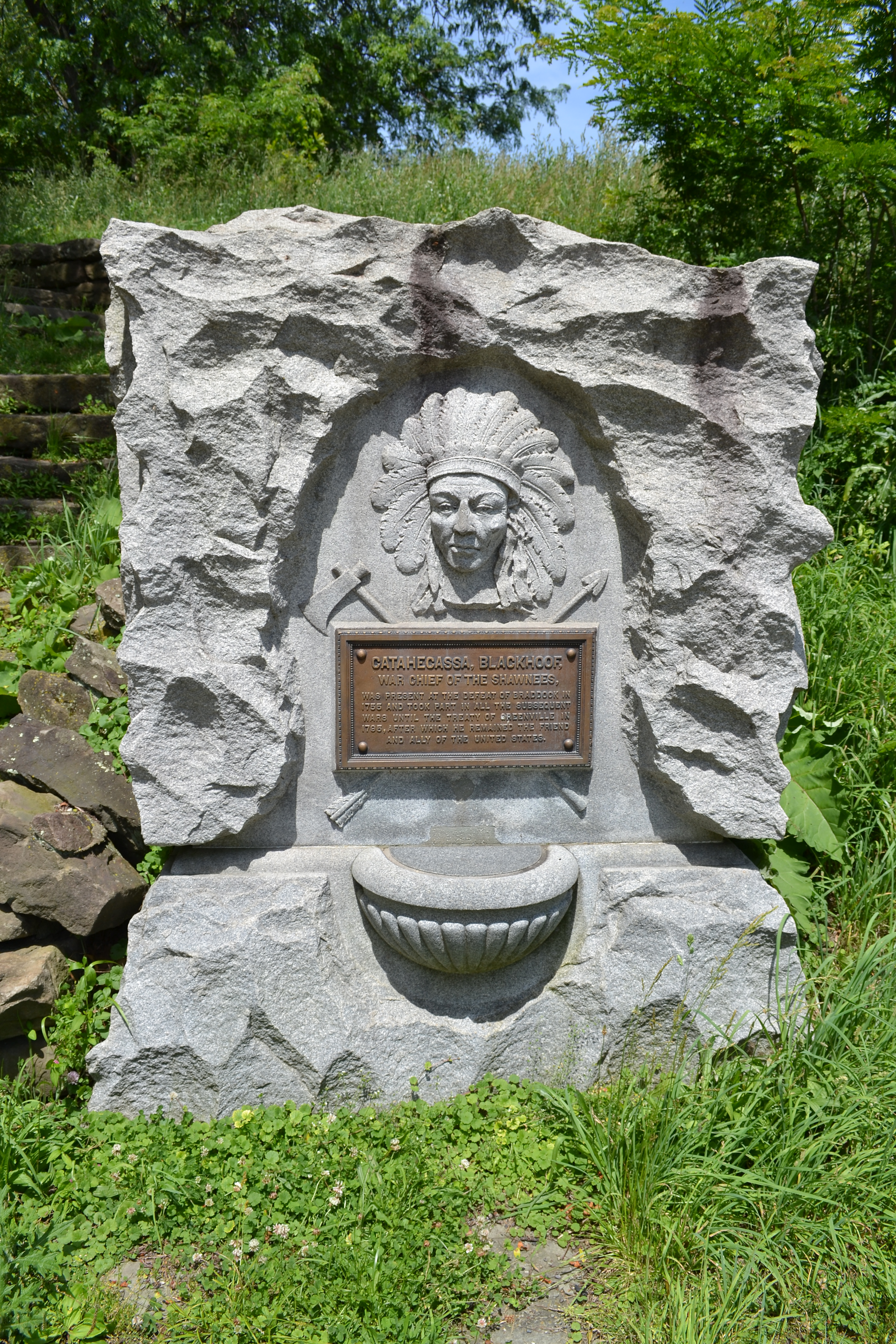
- The spring in 2019

- Location within Pittsburgh
- 40°26′7.82″N 79°56′8.30″W
- Location: E. Circuit Road (Schenley Park (Pittsburgh)), Pittsburgh, Pennsylvania, US

History
- Built: 1906-1907

Site notes
- Area: Schenley Park
- Governing body: City of Pittsburgh

The Catahecassa (Snyder) Spring is located at the intersection of E. Circuit Road and Serpentine Drive in Schenley Park in Pittsburgh, Pennsylvania. The spring was built in 1906–1907 and is one of only three remaining springs within the city.

== History ==
The first record of the natural spring in this location comes from an 1890 visitation of the park, and it describes the spring as extremely abundant in water. However, there was no mention of a structure at the location until 1899 when a small stone alcove is described there. The idea for the current fountain at the location was conceived following Fourth of July celebrations in 1906. The fund that had been for the celebrations had leftover money, and the donors chose to spend some of it erecting a new fountain in Schenley Park. James W. Clark, who was the Director of Public Works, approved the idea, and by September 1906 designs for the fountain were completed and published. Clark had been born into a prominent family in Washington, Pennsylvania, and had worked his way up through a career in public service, and he was the one who chose the subject matter for the fountain. The man Clark chose to memorialize on the front façade of the spring was the Native American Shawnee Chief, Catahecassa. Chief Catahecassa claimed to be present at General Braddock’s defeat against the French during the French and Indian War after the failed British attempt to capture Fort Duquesne. He also fought at the Battle of Fallen Timbers, and was the Shawnee representative during the 1795 Treaty of Greenville signing, which ended hostilities between Native Americans and European-American settlers in Ohio. In the early 19th century Catahecassa was also known for his peace work as an avid proponent of adopting the customs of settlers, and adjusting Shawnee society into an agrarian one. He also refused to join with Tecumseh and Tecumseh’s War, instead choosing to lead his people away from confrontation. The fountain in Schenley Park was meant as a memorial to his historical legacy in the region, and it was completed and installed by May of 1907. The only significant alteration to the spring since then was an act of vandalism in December of 1928, in which the vandals demolished the tip of Catahecassa’s nose. That portion of the nose has since been replaced with concrete. The spring was nominated in January 2016 to become a City Historic Landmark by Preservation Pittsburgh.

== Architecture ==
The Catahecassa monument was done using realism as its architectural style. The fountain itself is made of roughly-hewn granite stele. It also has a bas-relief bust of Chief Catahecassa on the front, making it the only natural spring which has been fronted with a decorative, bas-relief stele. The relief is situated above a bronze plaque which reads:

"Catahecassa, Blackhoof, war chief of the Shawnees, was present at the defeat of Braddock in 1755 and took part in all subsequent wars until the treaty of Greenville in 1795, after which he remained a friend and ally of the United States."

== Gallery ==
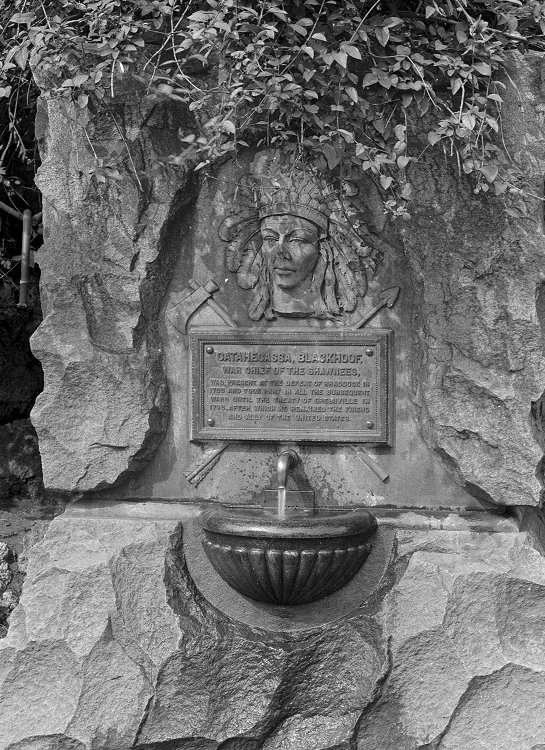
Photo from 1922 of Catahecassa Spring

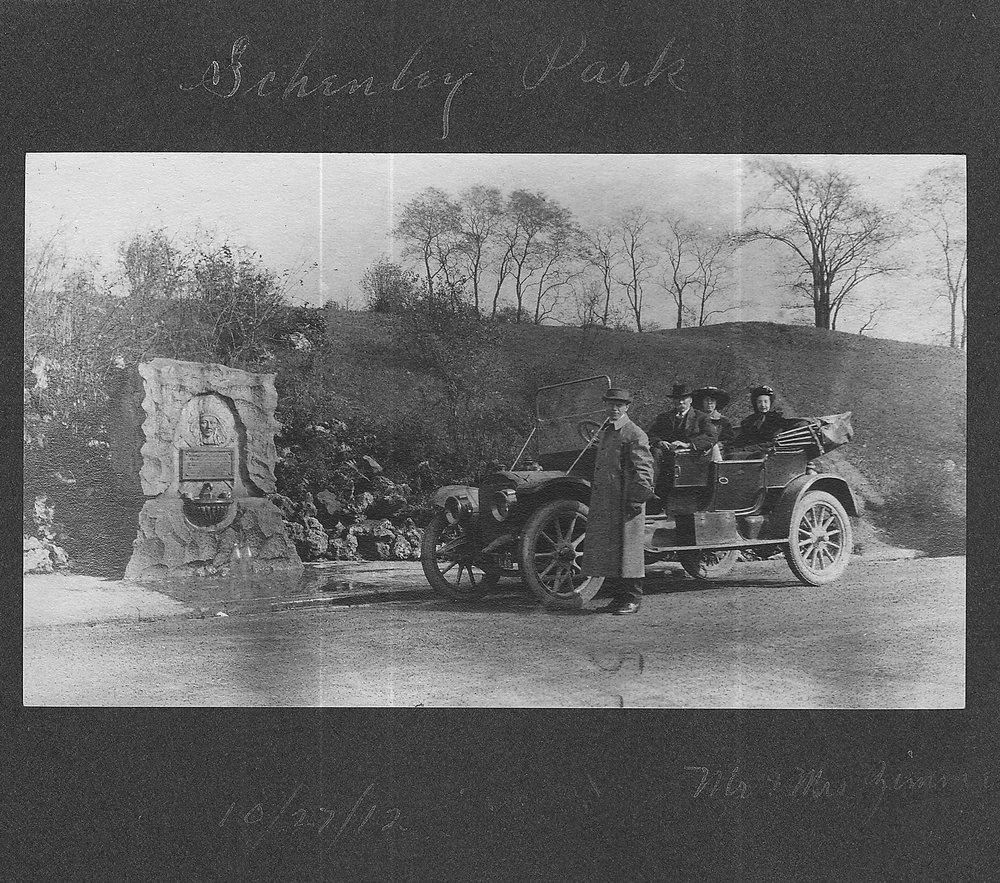
Photo from 1912 of Catahecassa Spring with car and family in front

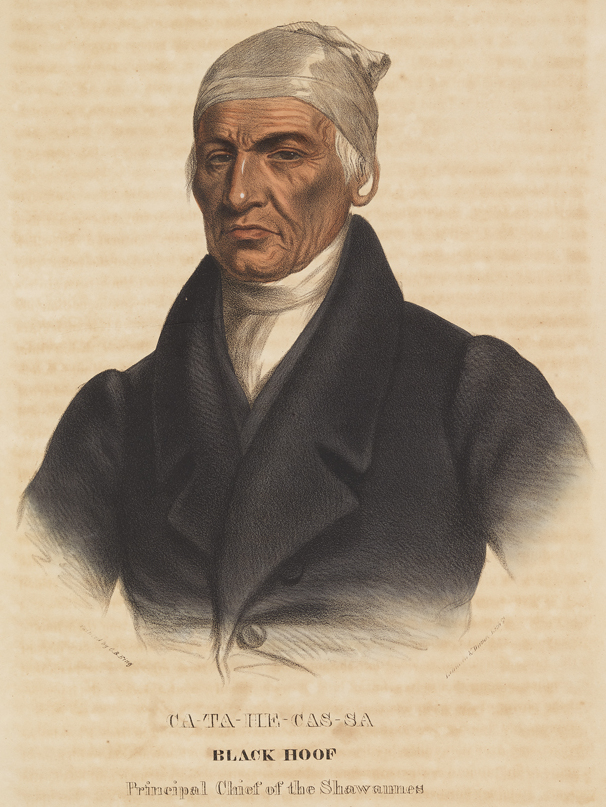
Portrait of Catahecassa
