= Pittsburgh Vintage Grand Prix =

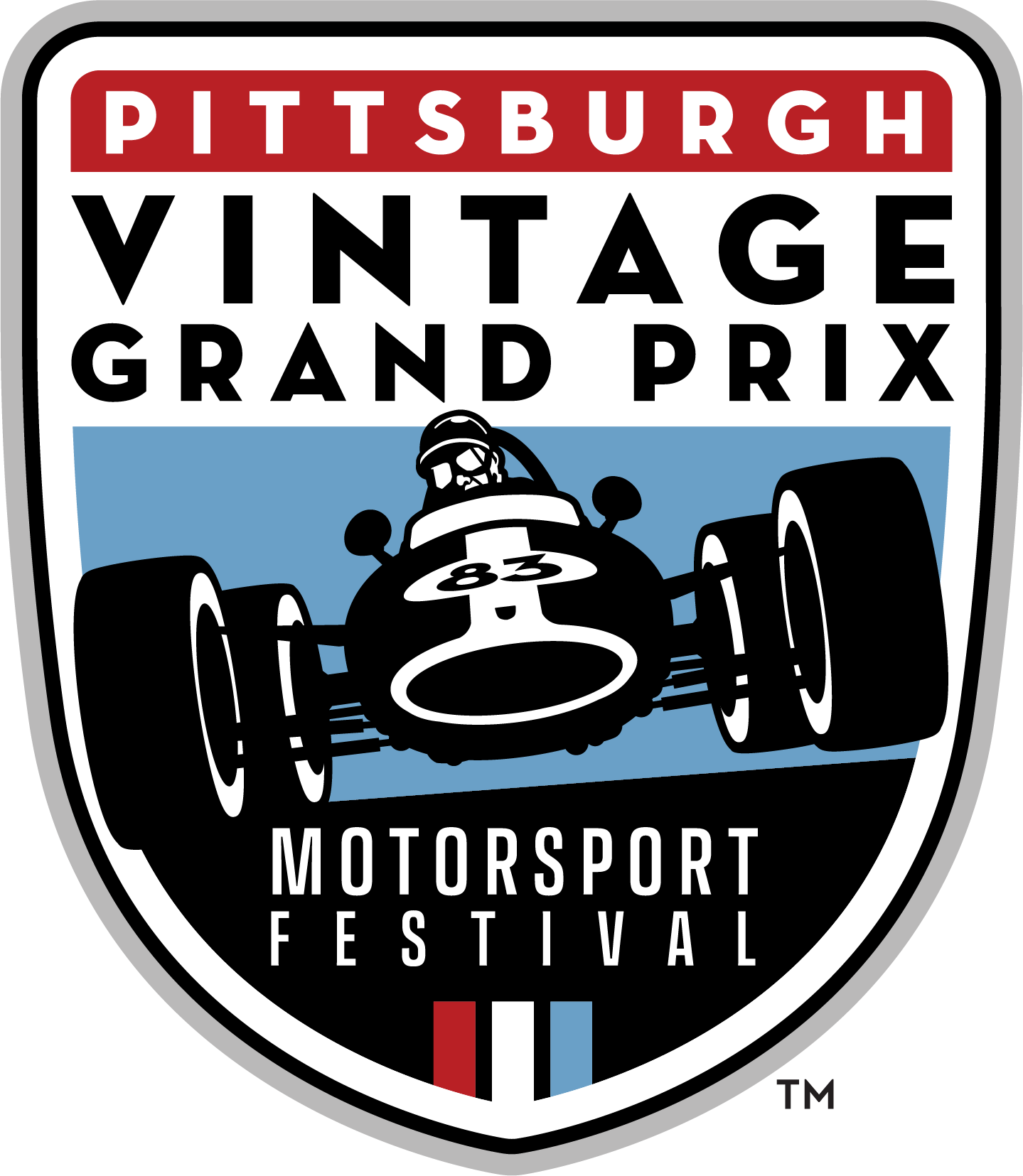
- Venue: Schenley Park; Pittsburgh International Race Complex
- First race: September 3, 1983
- Distance: 2.3 miles

The Pittsburgh Vintage Grand Prix is a vintage motor sports car race and 10-day Motorsport Festival that takes place annually in Pittsburgh, Pennsylvania. With an estimated 200,000 spectators during the 10 days, the Pittsburgh Vintage Grand Prix is one of the largest vintage sports car race events in the United States and the only one run on city streets. The 2024 event starts with the PVGP Historics at Pittsburgh International Race Complex on the July 26-28 weekend and includes the Ford GT Reunion. There are car show and motorsport events throughout the week and the following weekend in Schenley Park on August 3/4 as vintage racers compete on city streets with 50,000 fans watching each day from the Bob O'Connor Golf Course each day. The race originated in 1983 and grows each year with an ever-widening national and international recognition as one of the premier vintage motorsports events. The race is the highlight of a 10-day Race Week.

The event at Schenley Park hosts 125 vintage racers, 3,000 show cars and 100,000 weekend spectators. The street course, considered the most challenging on the vintage race circuit traverses Schenley Park's Serpentine Drive and consists of a 2.33-mile circuit that has 23 turns with haybales, manhole covers, telephone poles, and stone walls. 2024 will mark the 42nd year with the signature event, the International Car Show and Vintage Races, through the streets of Schenley Park on the August 3/4, 2024 weekend. Since 1983 the event has donated $6.7 million to autistic and developmentally disabled individuals throughout the Pittsburgh region.

The Grand Prix has developed into a 10-day celebration of motorsports and in addition to two weekends of racing it now includes a Black-Tie Gala, a Tune-Up Party, a Road Rallye, a downtown car display, an Airport Hangar Party, Countryside Tour and three car shows.

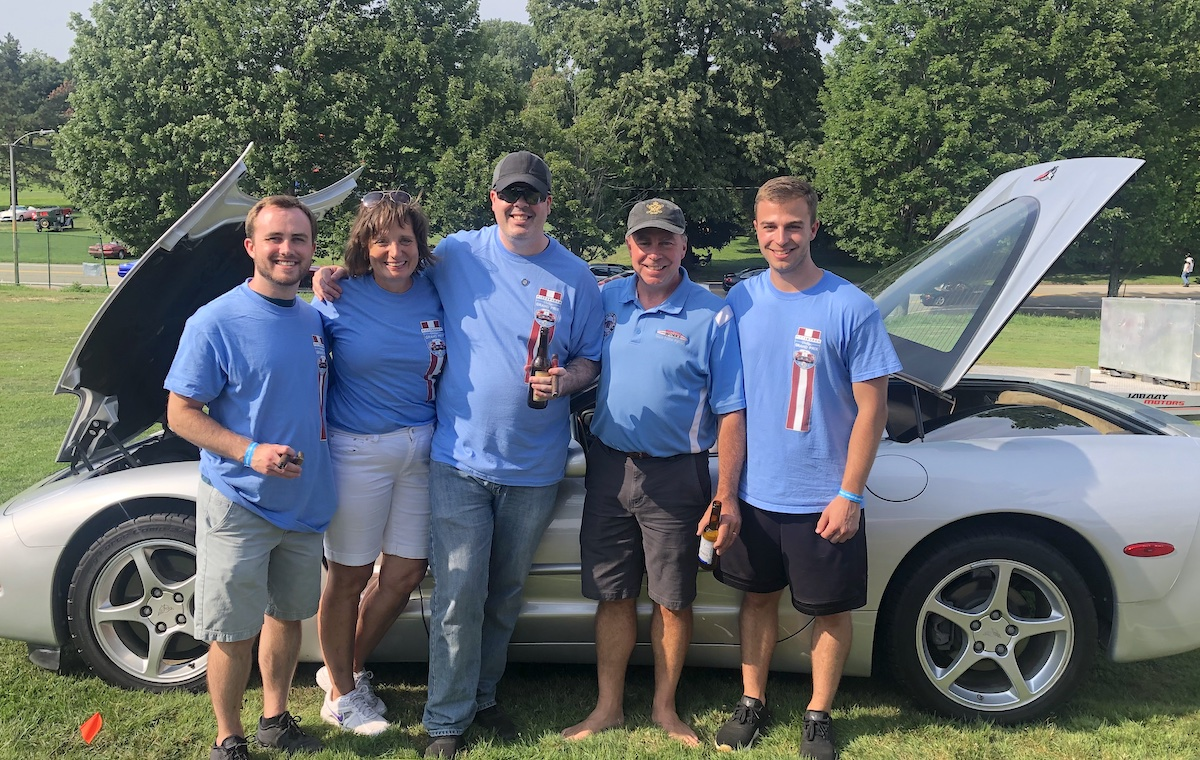
Over 1,000 volunteers help out at the event.

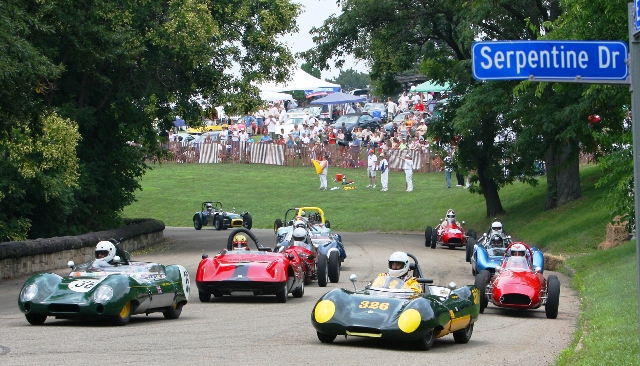
Sports Racer Group approaches hairpin turn at Serpentine Drive

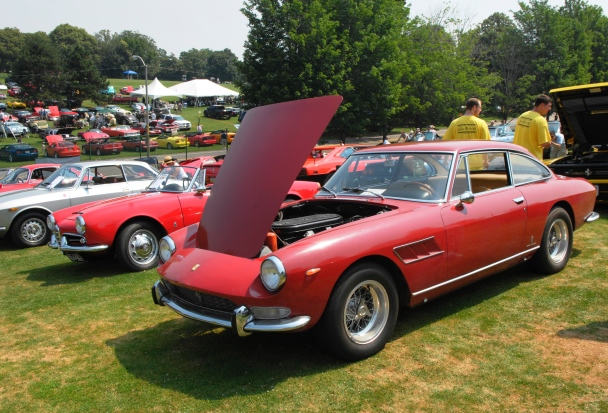
The International Car Show features 3,000 cars displayed on the golf course overlooking the races.
