= Panther Hollow =

- Sub-neighborhood
- Location within Central Oakland
- Coordinates: 40.43975°N 79.95108°W
- Country: United States
- State: Pennsylvania
- County: Allegheny County
- City: Pittsburgh
- Neighborhood: Oakland (Pittsburgh)

Panther Hollow is a small, somewhat isolated community at the bottom of Joncaire Street in Junction Hollow that runs along Boundary Street and is located in the Central Oakland neighborhood of Pittsburgh, Pennsylvania. The community was settled in late 19th century mostly by Italian immigrants from Pizzoferrato and Gamberale, Italy. Even today, park benches and picnic tables in the neighborhood are painted in the red, white, and green of the Italian flag and a sign post marks the distance to the two Italian cities from which most of the original residents arrived. Among its most famous such residents was Pittsburgh boxing legend Mose Butch. A remembrance memorial in the neighborhood, dedicated on December 2, 2007, commemorates the original 95 families that first settled in the neighborhood.

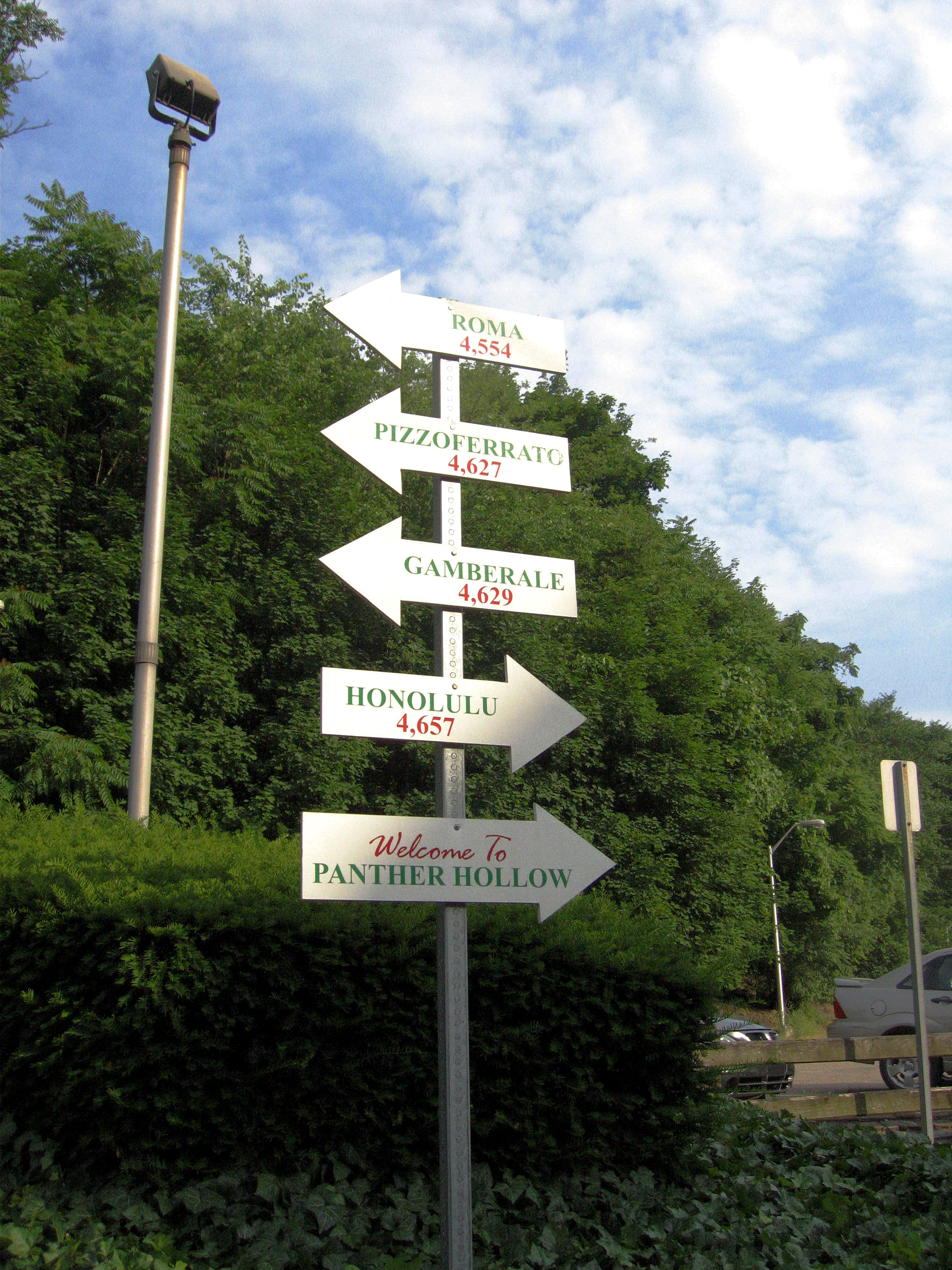
Panther Hollow sign post

== See also ==
- Panther Hollow Lake
- Panther Hollow Bridge
