= Panther Hollow Lake =

Lake in Pittsburgh, Pennsylvania

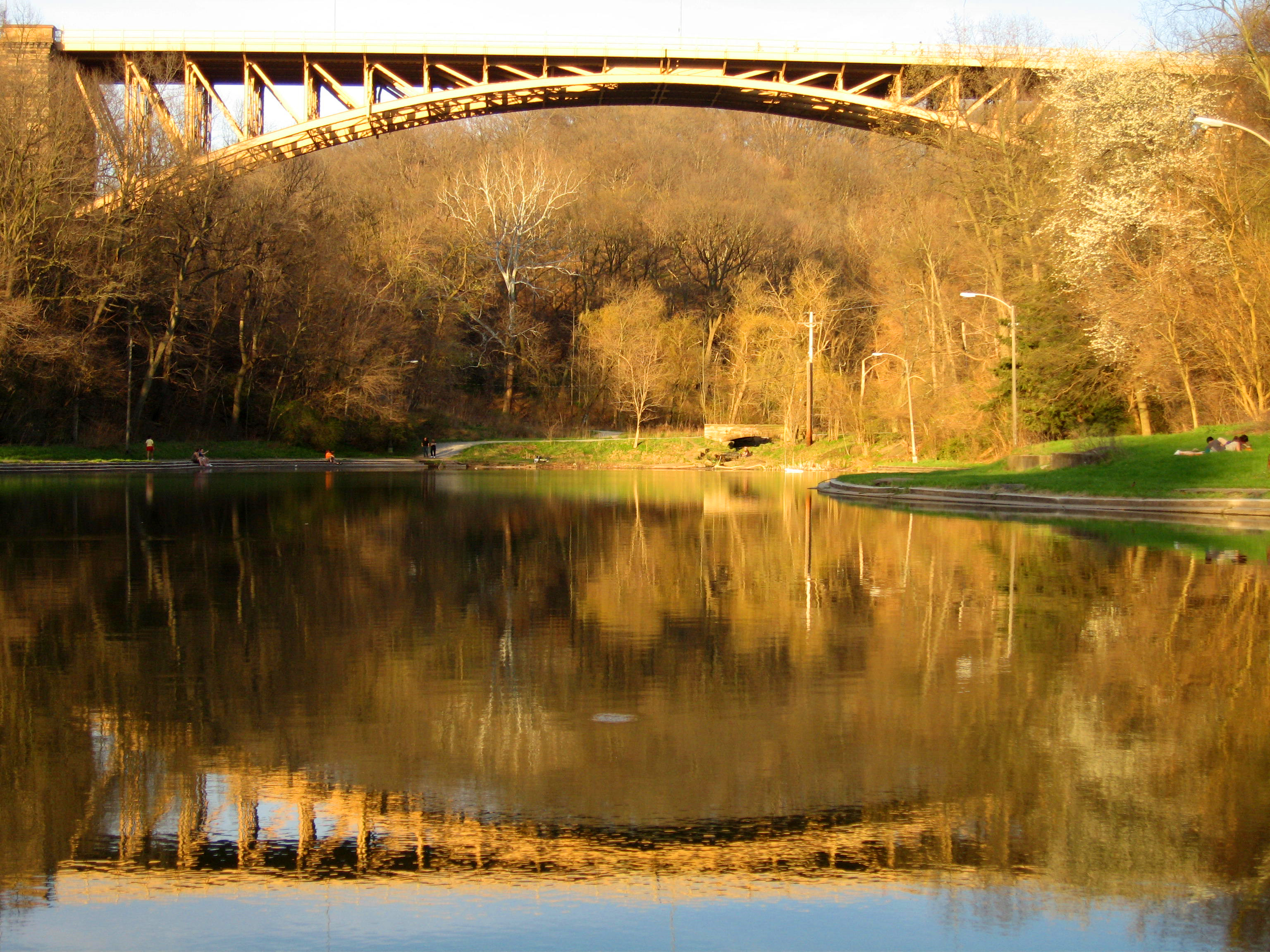

- Location within Pennsylvania Location within the United States
- Location: Panther Hollow, Schenley Park, Pittsburgh, Pennsylvania
- Coordinates: 40°26′13″N 79°56′53″W
- Type: Artificial lake
- Part of: Panther Hollow Watershed
- Primary inflows: Phipps Run; Panther Hollow Run
- Primary outflows: Four Mile Run
- Basin countries: United States
- Surface area: 2 acres (0.81 ha)
- Surface elevation: 804 ft (245 m)

Panther Hollow Lake is a human-made lake in Schenley Park in Pittsburgh, Pennsylvania.

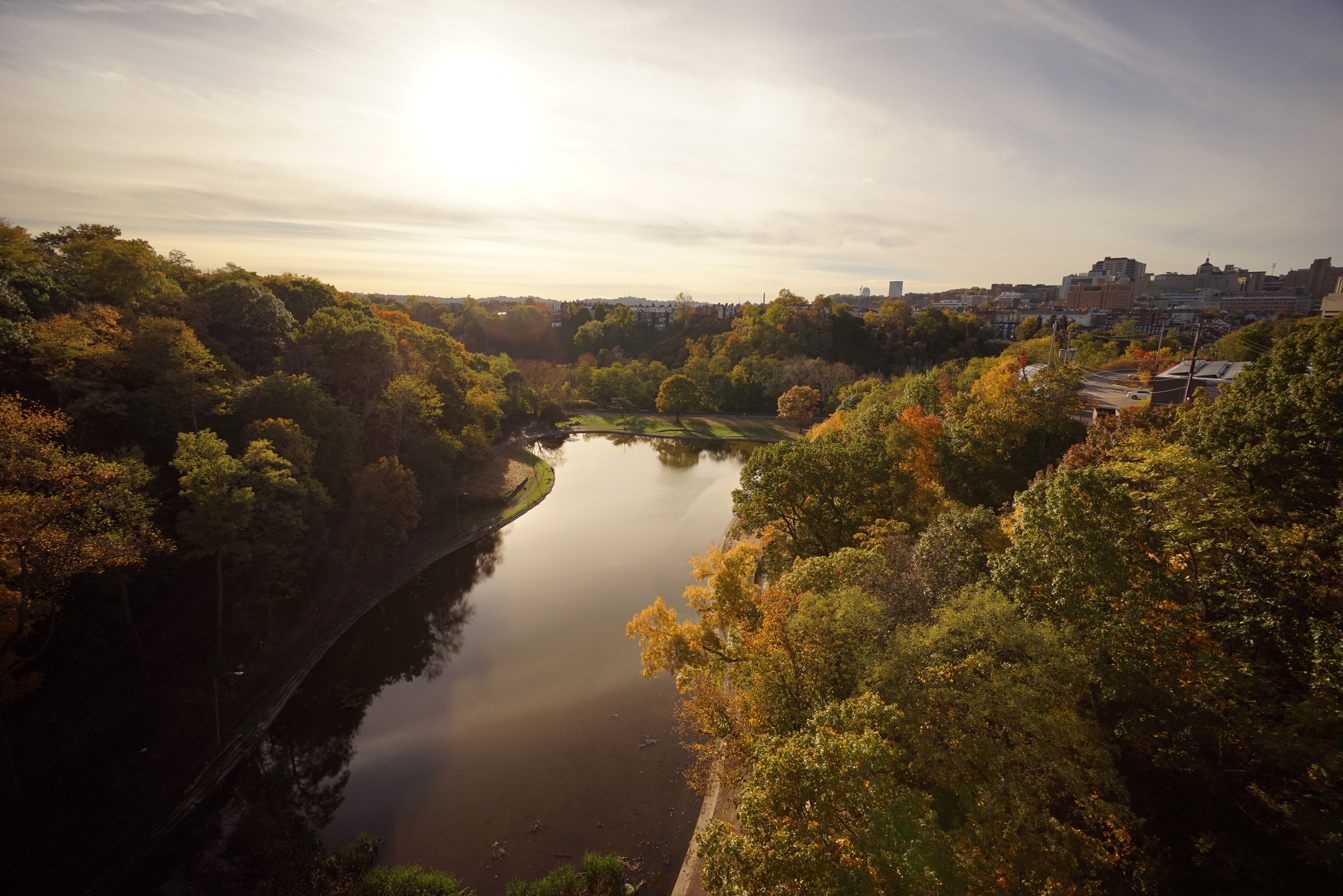
The lake as seen from Panther Hollow Bridge

== Watershed ==
The lake serves as a catch basin for the 300-acre (120 ha) Panther Hollow Watershed, which includes sections of Schenley Park and Squirrel Hill. It receives storm drainage from the watershed, which it sends to the Monongahela River via the Four Mile Run. Two streams, Phipps Run and Panther Hollow Run, flow through Schenley Park, feeding the lake.

== History ==
=== Before the park ===
Before Schenley Park was built and Squirrel Hill was heavily settled, there were several tributaries throughout the park and Squirrel Hill which formed a part of the watershed. Today, the streams in Squirrel Hill are buried, and feed the city sewer system instead of the lake.

=== Construction ===
The lake was originally constructed in 1892 as part of the early development of Schenley Park. At this time it was about 600 feet (180 m) long and 275 feet (84 m) wide. The lake was a popular gathering place which was used for rowing in summer and ice skating in winter. However, by 1907 it had filled with so much sediment that it was only 6 inches (15 cm) deep in most places. Around the same time, Schenley Park was undergoing a new round of improvements, such as the construction of Schenley Oval and the Tufa Bridges. In 1909, the lake was expanded and rebuilt with a concrete lining and a new boathouse was added.

=== Decline and first renovation ===
Over the years, sediment and silt built up in the lake, raising the bottom of the lake bed significantly. A major renovation was ordered in 1957 by then‑mayor David L. Lawrence, in which the lake was drained completely, the walls of the lake re-constructed, and the lake re-filled with small shrubs. However, after a two-year period of shrubs, water was returned into the lake.

=== Popular activities ===
Originally, there was a boathouse located on the lake, which provided patrons with a pastime. Ice skating was also popular on the lake up until the 1970s.

=== Second decline and second renovation ===
After many years of neglect, the boathouse was demolished in 1979, and the lake gradually fell out of use with the general public. The lake sediment began to pile up again, rendering the majority of the lake less than 4 feet (1.2 m) deep. Currently, the Pittsburgh Parks Conservancy has adopted a plan to bring the lake back to its original splendor, including a full restoration of the lake, a rehabilitation of the watershed, and a reconstruction of the boathouse.
