= Panther Hollow (valley) =

Valley in Pittsburgh, Pennsylvania, United States

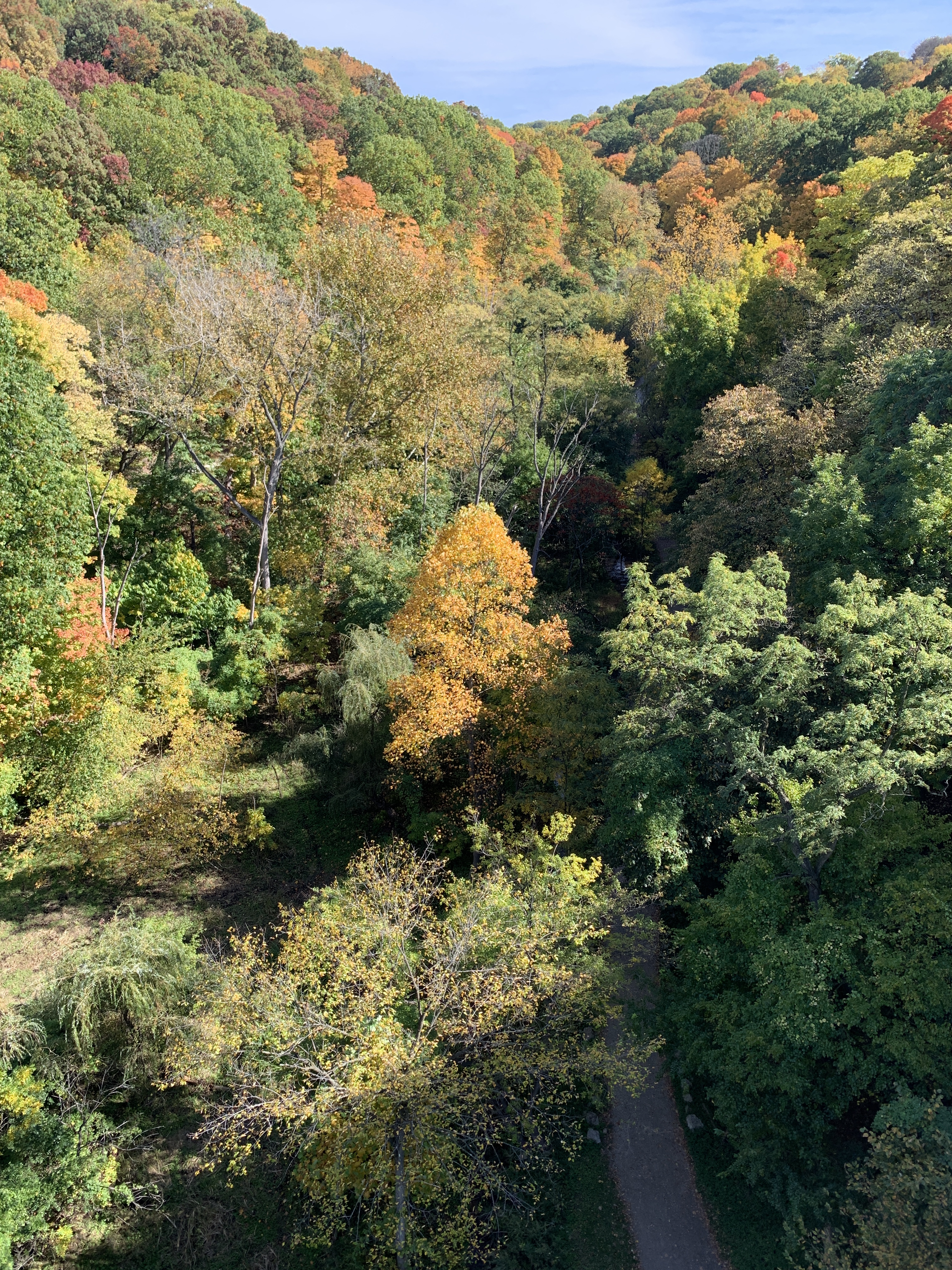
- Panther Hollow as seen from Panther Hollow Bridge
- Long-axis direction: West-East

Geography
- Location: Schenley Park, Pittsburgh, Pennsylvania, USA
- Coordinates: 40.43537°N 79.94097°W
- Interactive map of Panther Hollow

Panther Hollow is a wooded valley in Pittsburgh, Pennsylvania, that runs approximately 1.5 mi (2.4 km) west to east through Schenley Park. It begins at Boundary Street in Junction Hollow and ends near Hobart Street in Squirrel Hill. The neighborhood of Panther Hollow in Central Oakland is not actually in the valley of Panther Hollow itself, but rather in Junction Hollow.

The hollow features the man-made Panther Hollow Lake, on the east end of which is the confluence of Panther Hollow Run (which generally follows the valley) and Phipps Run. Created in the 1880s, Panther Hollow Lake was once the center of a busy picnic and recreational area that included a boat house adjacent to the lake from which couples could rent boats for an afternoon. The boathouse was razed in the 1930s. Today, hiking trails follow both streams.

The heavily-travelled Panther Hollow Road lies on the southern edge of the hollow. It begins where the Boulevard of the Allies ends at Anderson Bridge in Oakland and continues through Schenley Park to become Hobart Street to the park's east.

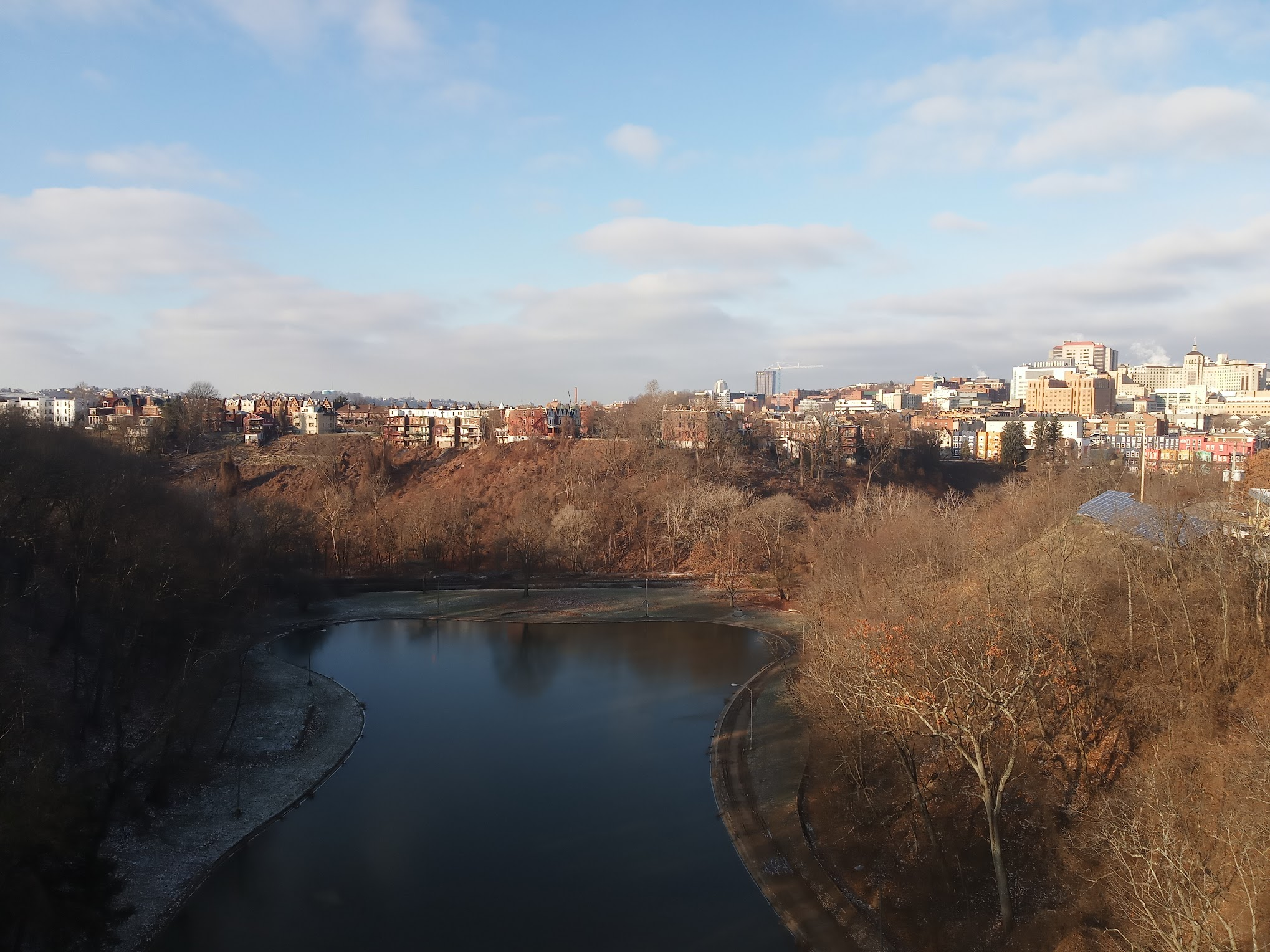
View from the Panther Hollow Bridge on a cold day

Above the lake some 120 feet is Panther Hollow Bridge, which carries Schenley Drive over the hollow. The landmark 1897 bridge features bronze sculptures by Giuseppe Moretti of four panthers, crouching as sentinels, on each corner.

The hollow is named for the mountain lions once native to the area. The University of Pittsburgh, adjacent to the park, also uses the panther as its mascot. At one time, painting or defacing the Moretti sculptures was a popular form of vandalism committed by the fans of rival universities prior to the schools' football games.
