= Mary Schenley =

American philanthropist

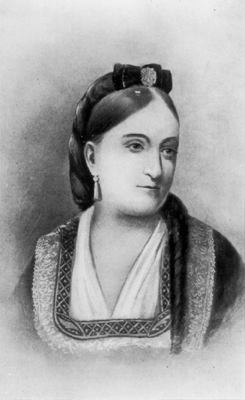
- 19th century lithograph of Schenley
- Born: Mary Elizabeth Croghan; April 27, 1827; Louisville, Kentucky, US
- Died: November 5, 1903 (aged 77); London, England
- Spouse: Edward Wyndham Harrington Schenley (m. 1842; died 1878)
- Children: 7
- Parent(s): William Croghan Jr. Mary O'Hara Croghan

Mary Elizabeth Croghan Schenley (April 27, 1826 – November 5, 1903) was an American philanthropist to the city of Pittsburgh, Pennsylvania.

== Early life ==
Mary Elizabeth Croghan was born April 27, 1827, at Locust Grove near Louisville, Kentucky, to Col. William Croghan Jr. and Mary Carson O'Hara, the daughter of frontier Pittsburgh businessman James O'Hara. As her mother's only heir, she eventually inherited large tracts of land amassed by her maternal grandfather, Gen. James O'Hara.

== Marriage and scandal ==
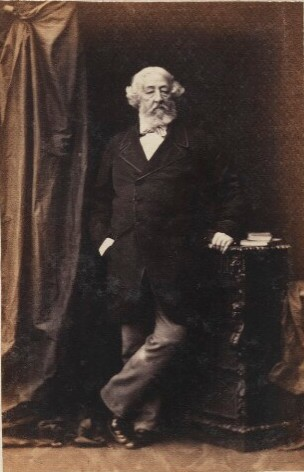
Photograph of her husband, 1861

While in boarding school in Staten Island, New York, at the age of 14, she met and fell in love with 42-year-old Captain Edward Wyndham Harrington Schenley of the British Army, and eloped to England. It was the captain's third elopement. The ensuing scandal sparked coverage in many American newspapers, and was referred to as "the greatest romance in Pittsburg's early history" in her New York Times obituary.

When Mary's father, a widower, heard of the elopement of his only child, he fainted, according to one Pittsburgh paper. He demanded that the federal government in Washington, DC intercept the ship and that the Pennsylvania General Assembly in Harrisburg take action. He prompted church ministers and newspaper editors to make denunciations. Even in England, Queen Victoria for many years would refuse presentation of the couple at court because of the scandal.

Though the couple's boat was not intercepted, Col. Croghan was successful in March 1842 in getting the state legislature to "confirm the title of the whole of the property to the father of Miss Croghan, now the wife of the youthful captain, and places the same after his death, in the hands of trustees who are to pay at their discretion for her support," meaning the large estate was left in trust.

Newspapers also revealed that at the time of his elopement, Capt. Schenley was absent from his post as Her Majesty's Commissioner of Arbitration in a mixed court for the suppression of the slave trade in British Guiana. Therefore, when Schenley and his bride arrived in England, his superior, Lord Palmerston, ordered him back to his post in South America. Schenley's work there to free the slaves was exceedingly unpopular with the European minority; eventually, they forced his reassignment to England.

There the Schenleys were without means. Mary's father now had a change of heart and visited them in England. He bought them a house in London, arranged for a living allowance, and urged the couple to come to Pittsburgh to live with him. The Schenleys did come to Pittsburgh, but did not stay on, and returned to England. Her home, the Neal Log House, which she inherited from James O'Hara, is now preserved in Schenley Park.

Her father died in Pittsburgh in 1850 and Mary then received her full inheritance. In 1859, her husband became a Member of Parliament for Dartmouth, but three months later was unseated after an election petition committee found his win had been secured through bribery and corruption.

Mary and Capt. Schenley had eleven children. Mary Schenley died at her home in Hyde Park, London on November 5, 1903. At the time of her death, she was the largest owner of real estate in Allegheny County, Pennsylvania and her Pittsburgh real estate holdings at the time were worth more than $50 million. After her executors, including Andrew Carnegie, received $5,000 each, the remainder of her property was left to her children. Her English property, which was valued at about $5,000,000, was separately dealt with.

=== Philanthropy ===
Throughout the late 19th century, Mary Schenley made many gifts of money to churches and public schools in Pittsburgh.

More significantly, perhaps, she donated land to the city of Pittsburgh in 1889 for Schenley Park; to Western Pennsylvania Institute for the Blind for a school in 1890; and in 1895, she gave the oldest relic in Pittsburgh, the Fort Pitt Blockhouse and adjoining property, to the Daughters of the American Revolution.

She also donated the 19 acres (77,000 m^{2}) of land on which the Carnegie Institute, a gift of Andrew Carnegie, was built. Carnegie paid visits to Mary Schenley at her villa, Mont Fleury, at Cannes, in the south of France.

== Legacy and honors ==
Much in the city of Pittsburgh still bears her name, including Schenley High School, Schenley Hotel, Schenley Bridge, Schenley Park, Schenley Plaza, Schenley Quadrangle, Schenley Tunnel, and the Mary Schenley Memorial Fountain.
