= Edward Manning Bigelow =

American politician (1850–1916)

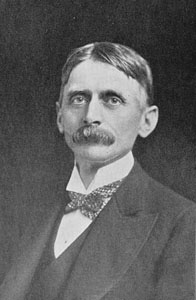
- Edward Manning Bigelow circa 1890

Director of Public Works of Pittsburgh
- In office 1888–1900
- In office July 1901 – November 1901
- In office 1903–1906

Personal details
- Born: November 6, 1850 Pittsburgh, Pennsylvania, U.S.
- Died: December 6, 1916 (aged 66) Pittsburgh, Pennsylvania, U.S.
- Resting place: Homewood Cemetery, Pittsburgh, Pennsylvania
- Education: University of Pittsburgh
- Occupation: Civil engineer, Public official
- Known for: "Father of Pittsburgh's parks"

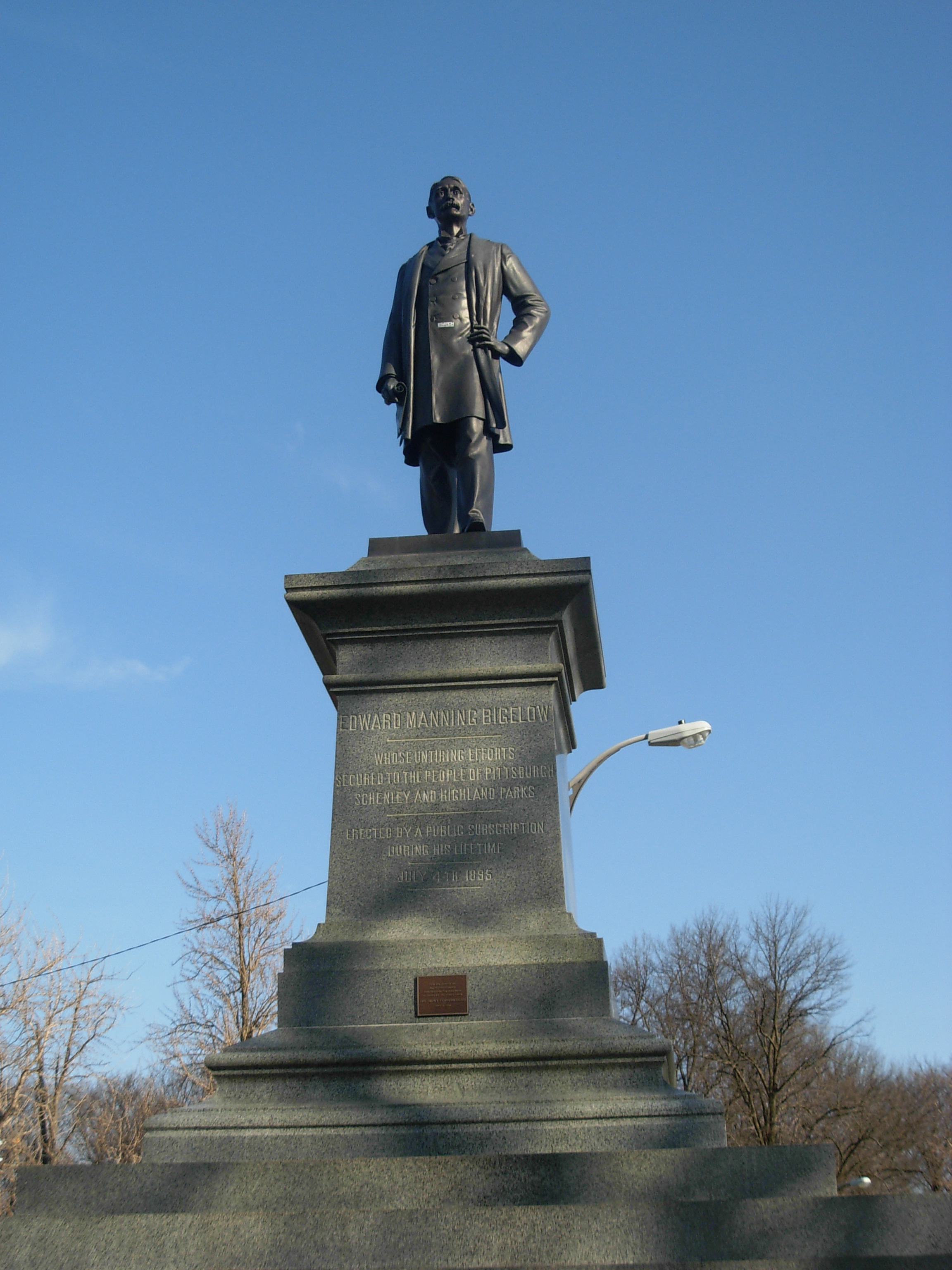
Edward Manning Bigelow monument in Schenley Park

Edward Manning Bigelow (November 6, 1850 – December 6, 1916), known as the "father of Pittsburgh's parks", was an American City Engineer and later Director of Public Works in Pittsburgh, Pennsylvania. He was responsible for major improvements in city's infrastructure, such as new boulevards, waterworks, and parks, many of them in today's Oakland neighborhood.

== Biography ==
Edward Manning Bigelow was born in Pittsburgh on November 6, 1850. A Presbyterian, he attended the University of Pittsburgh (then known as the Western University of Pennsylvania) as a civil engineering student. In 1880, he married Mary Peabody; they had no children.

In the late 19th century, Pittsburgh became a boomtown, known as a Steel City for its high concentration of steel mills. Bigelow, a close friend of Andrew Carnegie, joined the city administration and was appointed City Engineer in 1880. The position was transformed in 1888 into Director of Public Works, a position he held for three terms of office, first from 1888 to 1900, again between July 1901 and November 1901, and then from 1903 to 1906. In 1911, the Governor of Pennsylvania named him as a commissioner of the newly formed State Highway Department from 1911 to 1915.

During his tenure of over thirty years, Bigelow saw the need for urban parks in a highly industrialized city and acquired land for public park use. As park commissioner in the 1880s, Bigelow convinced Mary Schenley to donate land to the city in what became the Schenley Park, opened in 1889. He also acquired the land that would be used for the Highland Park (opened in 1893); spending more than $900,000 in city funds to buy the land, parcel by parcel, from farmers. As head of city planning in 1900, he started work on a system of grand boulevards (including Beechwood, Bigelow (then named Grant), and Washington boulevards) to connect the parks. One of these, initially known as the Grant Boulevard, now Bigelow Boulevard (renamed in Bigelow's honor soon after his death), was Pittsburgh's first rapid transit route. Others include the Boulevard of the Allies, Beechwood, and Washington Boulevard. His visions for park development made him unpopular with those who wanted to use the land for more building development, although he eventually triumphed. He also developed the water and sewer systems in Pittsburgh.

Barry Hannegan, director of historic landscape preservation for the Pittsburgh History & Landmarks Foundation, said in 2000 that "He (Bigelow) brought to Pittsburgh what we would now call state-of- the-art landscape architecture and horticulture" and "We owe him a lot. He was the first truly great planner in Pittsburgh."

Bigelow died on December 6, 1916, before taking the position of Public Works director for a fourth time. He was interred in Homewood Cemetery. On December 20, 1916, Grant Boulevard was posthumously named Bigelow Boulevard in memory of him.
