= James O'Hara (quartermaster) =

Irish-American military officer and industrialist (c.1752–1819)

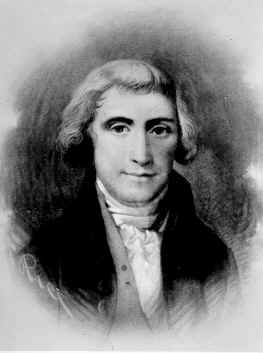
- Born: c. 1752; County Mayo, Kingdom of Ireland
- Died: December 17, 1819; Pittsburgh, U.S.
- Military career
- Allegiance: United Kingdom (1770–1771); United States (after 1772)
- Branch: British Army; Continental Army; U.S. Army
- Rank: Quartermaster General
- Units: Coldstream Guards; 3rd Virginia Regiment
- Conflicts: American Revolutionary War

James O'Hara (c. 1752 – 1819) was an American military officer, businessman, and captain of early industry in Pittsburgh, Pennsylvania, United States.

== Early life ==
He was born in County Mayo, Kingdom of Ireland, the son of Major John O'Hara, and in 1765 attended the Jesuit College of Saint-Sulpice in Paris. He served in the Coldstream Guards, a regiment of the British Army, in 1770, and resigned his ensign's commission the next year to gain business skills as a clerk in a ship broker's office in Liverpool. He eventually emigrated to the American colonies to seek business opportunities.

O'Hara arrived at Philadelphia, Pennsylvania, in 1772. By 1773 he had established himself on the colonial frontier at Pittsburgh, where he worked for the traders Devereaux Smith and Ephraim Douglas. He spent two years learning to do business with the Native Americans of Western Pennsylvania and Virginia. In 1774 he was appointed a colonial government agent to the Indians and he began to purchase tracts of land in the region. During this period his knowledge of French and his ability to learn Indian dialects made him very successful.

== U.S. military service ==
At the outbreak of the American Revolutionary War he enlisted in the 3rd Virginia Regiment, where he was elected captain. He served at Fort Pitt and Fort Kanawha. In 1781 he served as commissary of the general hospital at Carlisle, Pennsylvania, and from 1781 to 1783 as assistant quartermaster under General Nathanael Greene. On April 19, 1792, he was appointed by U.S. President George Washington as the sixth Quartermaster General of the U.S. Army. He served until 1796. There is some confusion about his rank, but he was not a general officer. By law, he was entitled to the pay and privileges of a lieutenant colonel. Many referred to him as "Colonel" O'Hara. However, he signed his correspondence, "James O'Hara, Q.M.G."

== Business life ==
In 1783 while in Philadelphia, O'Hara met and married Mary Carson, with whom he had six children. They moved back to Pittsburgh in 1784, where he started a general store, O'Hara & Company. He did business during the next decade as a government contractor, providing Generals Josiah Harmar and Arthur St. Clair with provisions during the Northwest Indian Wars.

By the 1790s he was a prominent businessman in Pittsburgh. He established the Pittsburgh Glassworks in 1795. He set up a salt business, a sawmill, and with partner John Reed established Pittsburgh Point Brewery. He also invested in ship building and in John Henry Hopkins' Ligonier ironworks. He became president of the Bank of Pennsylvania. All the while he continued as an enterprising land speculator in Pittsburgh and Allegheny County.

== Politics ==
Though O'Hara was affiliated with the Federalist Party, he was only tempted by political office once, in 1802, when he ran unsuccessfully for U.S. Congress. He was Pittsburgh's chief burgess (known today as mayor) in 1803.

James O'Hara died at his home on Water Street in Pittsburgh on December 17, 1819.

== Tributes to O'Hara ==
O'Hara's name is attached to streets in Pittsburgh as well as the suburb of O'Hara Township, Pennsylvania. The attack transport ship USS James O'Hara (APA-90) saw extensive action in World War II. In 1963 the novelist Agnes Sligh Turnbull published a fictionalized account of his life entitled The King's Orchard.

He is also the maternal grandfather of Mary Schenley, who would donate the homesteads of her grandfather to the now booming industrial city of Pittsburgh a century after James O'Hara staked them out. Much of her donations of her grandfather's lands were developed into Schenley Park, Schenley Plaza, and the Schenley Farms neighborhood. His home, Neill Log House, is preserved in Schenley Park as a historic structure.
