= Tufa Bridges =

Two bridges in Pittsburgh, Pennsylvania, US

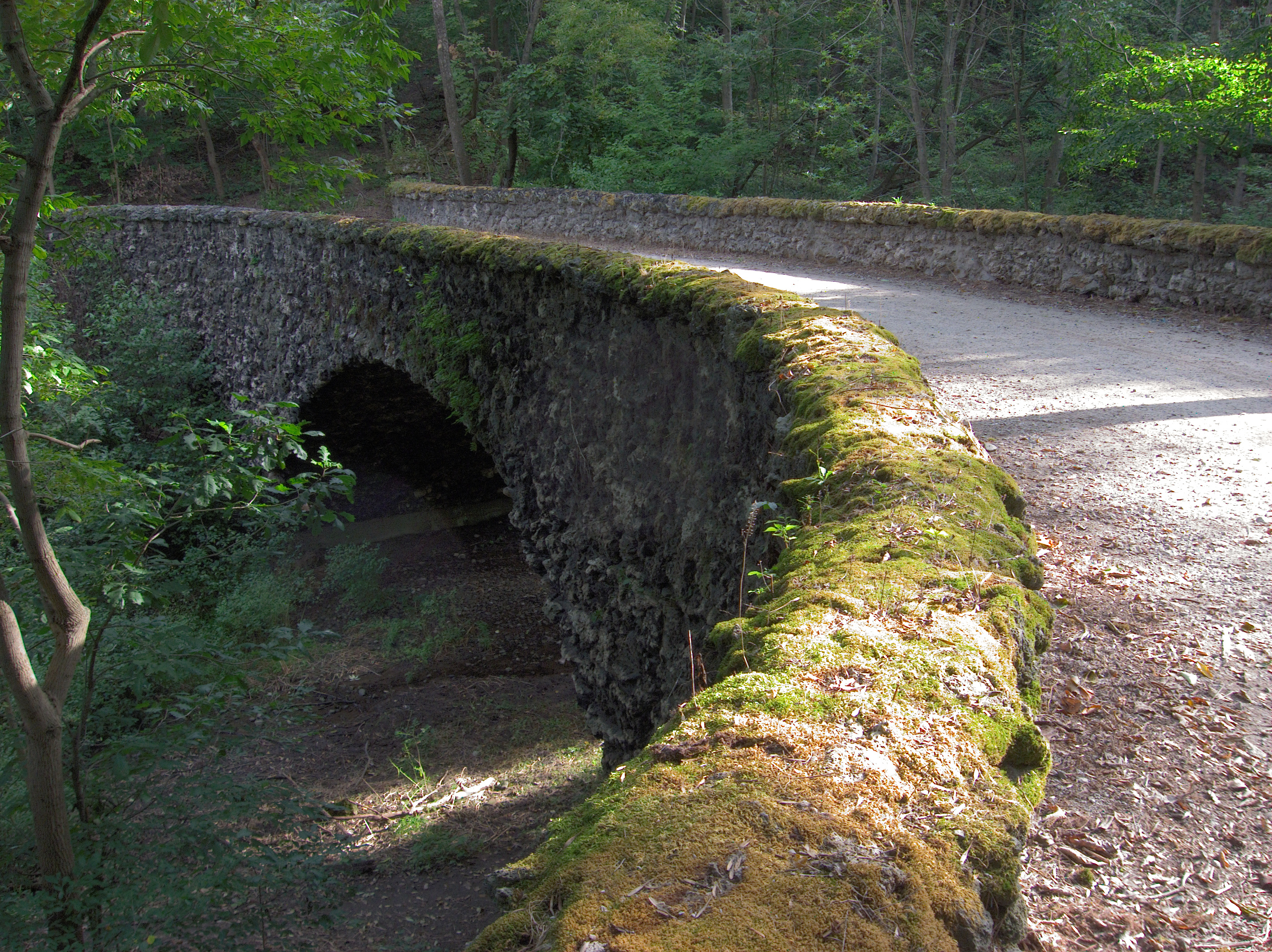

- Location within Pittsburgh
- 40°26′2.30″N 79°56′8.21″W
- Location: (Schenley Park (Pittsburgh)), Pittsburgh, Pennsylvania, USA

History
- Built: 1908

Site notes
- Area: Schenley Park
- Architect: George W. Burke
- Governing body: City of Pittsburgh

The Tufa Bridges are two bridges made of tufa stone located in Schenley Park in Pittsburgh, Pennsylvania. Built in 1908 by George W. Burke, the bridges currently serve as part of a footpath within the park.

== History ==
The idea for the construction of the two bridges came from George Burke, who was the Superintendent of City Parks for the Department of Public Works. Burke had no prior experience in architecture, engineering, building, or designing, but rather he was a horticulturist and city official. Burke was a Pittsburgh native and entered into work with the City of Pittsburgh in 1890 as a park foreman. In 1903 the parks became a separate bureau of the Department of Public Works, and with that change Burke was hired as parks superintendent. From this position he was responsible for maintaining Phipps Conservatory and Schenley Park. Phipps Conservatory, which is also located in Schenley Park, was made possible through a gift from Henry Phipps Jr, and under Burke it became world famous for its flower shows. Up until his death, Burke made significant improvements to both Schenley Park and Phipps Conservatory, including the construction of the two tufa bridges. Burke chose the bridge locations in a dark and shady area of the park so as to make sure that moss and lichens would cover the stones in order to make the bridges a picturesque part of the Victorian-era style park. Construction began in March 1908, and Burke oversaw the entire project. The bridges extended the bridle path across the hillsides and Nature Ravine, Phipps Run. The bridges were finished and opened up to the public in early 1909. The bridges continue to operate as part of the walking trails in Schenley Park, with only minor repairs needing to be made to replace and repair some tufa stones in 2010. The bridges were nominated in August 2017 to become a City Historic Landmark by Preservation Pittsburgh.

== Architecture ==
The bridges were designed by George Burke in the Rustic or Romantic Arch Bridge architectural style. What is most significant about the architecture of the bridges is the method of construction and materials used. The body of the bridge was made with reinforced concrete with steel rods. The tufa stones came from a quarry in Northeastern Ohio. The concrete was poured into a frame with the tufa built up into a mold on the sides, and then after the concrete hardened to the tufa, the frame was removed. These tufa bridges are the only bridges in the world made in this style with tufa stones. The tufa stones themselves also give the bridge a unique look. The stone cladding on these bridges has overtime become unnaturally blackened. Geologists have speculated two different reasons for this. The first being that the coal dust that was abundant in Pittsburgh during the mid-twentieth century caused the darkening, and the second being that the darkening is a result of manganese oxidation. This darkening of the tufa stone makes the bridge visually unique, and the construction with tufa stones makes in architecturally unique.

== Gallery ==
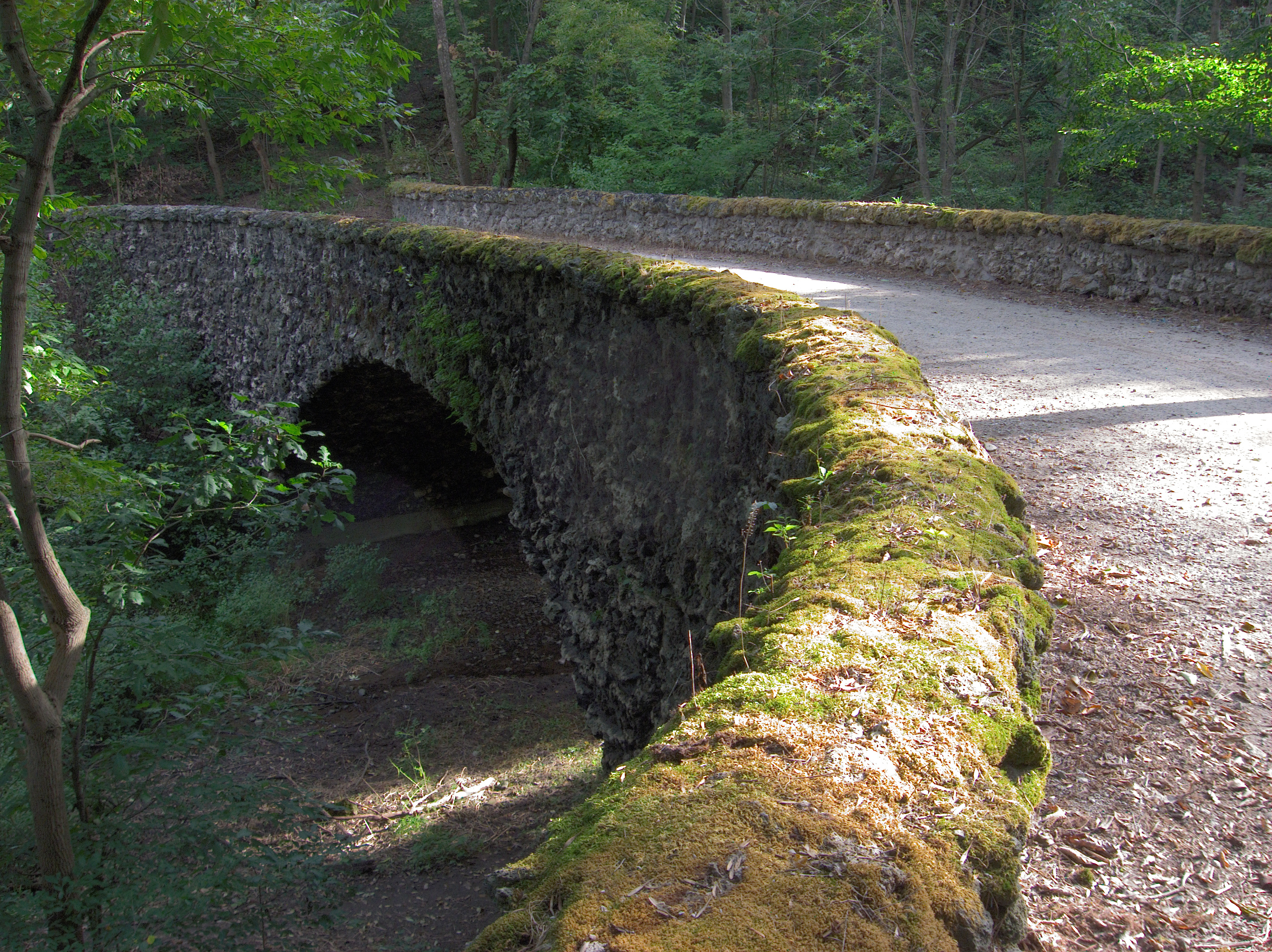
Tufa Bridge today

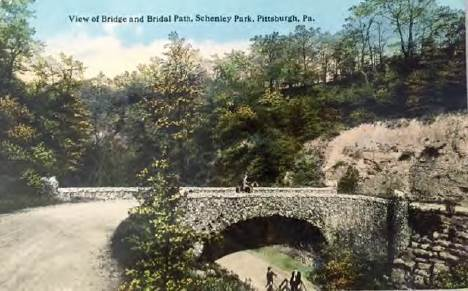
Historic view of Tufa Bridge

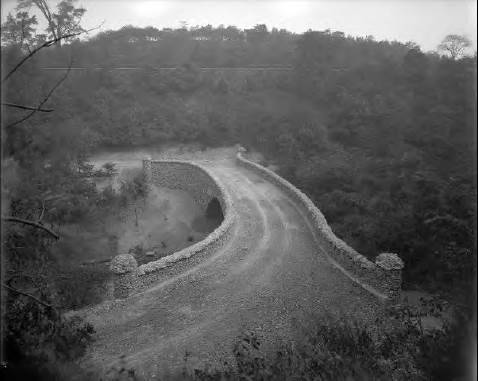
Tufa Bridge from above
