= Schenley Park =

Park in Pittsburgh, Pennsylvania

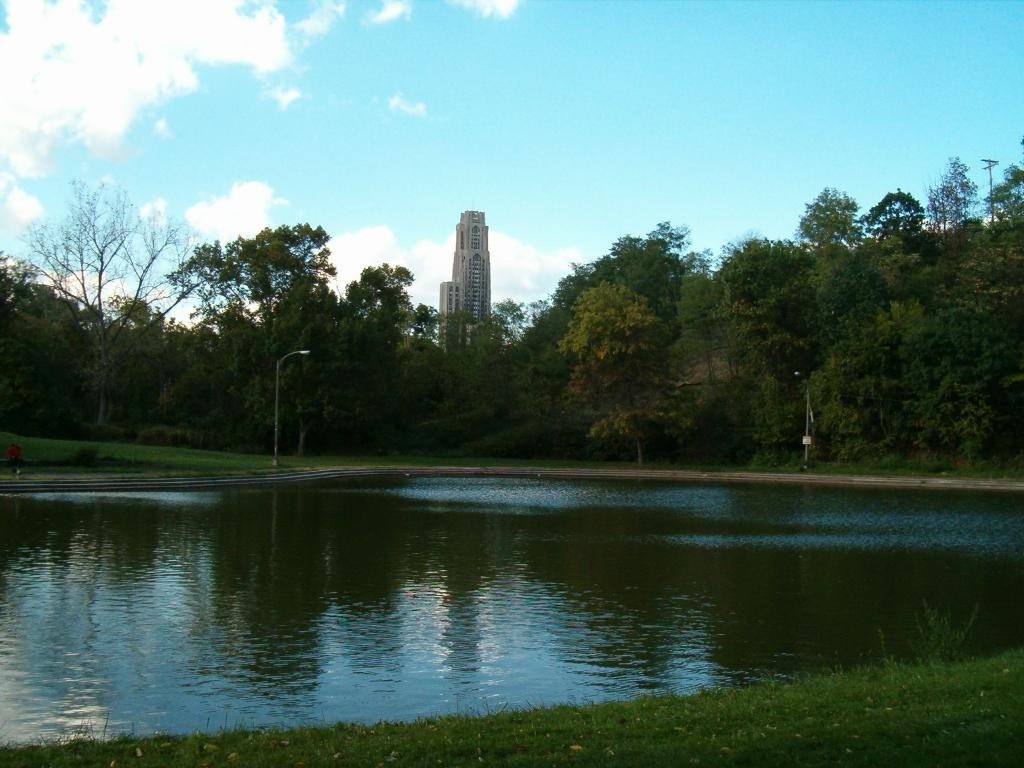
- Cathedral of Learning seen from Panther Hollow Lake
- Interactive map of Schenley Park
- Type: Municipal park
- Location: Schenley Drive and Panther Hollow Road, Pittsburgh, Pennsylvania, United States
- Coordinates: 40.4344°N 79.9428°W
- Area: 456 acres (185 ha)
- Created: October 30, 1889
- Operator: City of Pittsburgh Parks & Recreation (CitiParks), Department of Public Works
- Status: Open all year
- Website: Official website
- Schenley Park
- U.S. National Register of Historic Places
- U.S. Historic district
- Pittsburgh Landmark – PHLF
- Architect: Edward Manning Bigelow
- Architectural style: Multiple styles
- NRHP reference No.: 85003506

Significant dates
- Added to NRHP: November 13, 1985
- Designated PHLF: 1989

Schenley Park (/ˈʃɛnli/) is a large municipal park in Pittsburgh, Pennsylvania, United States. It is located between the neighborhoods of Oakland, Greenfield, and Squirrel Hill. It is also listed on the National Register of Historic Places as a historic district. In 2011, the park was named one of "America's Coolest City Parks" by Travel + Leisure.

The park is made up of 300 acres (120 ha) donated by Mary Schenley in 1889 and another 120 acres (49 ha) that the city subsequently purchased from her. Another 36 acres (15 ha) were acquired at a later date, bringing the park's total size to 456 acres (185 ha), and making it the second largest municipal park in Pittsburgh, behind Frick Park.

The park borders the campuses of Carnegie Mellon University and the University of Pittsburgh.

== Facilities ==
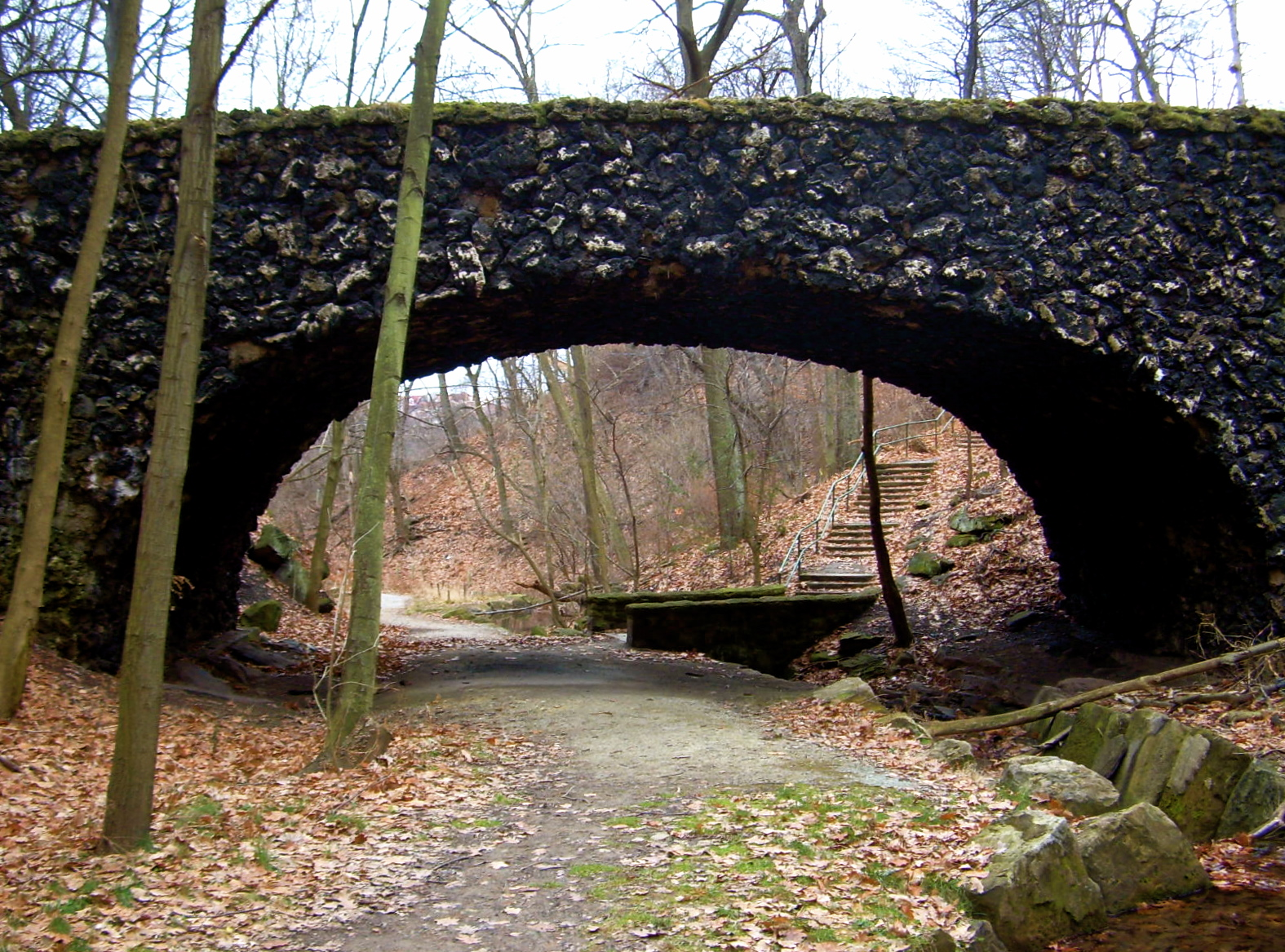
One of the Tufa Bridges over Panther Hollow Run, below the visitor center.

Schenley Park features a grand entrance, Schenley Plaza, and several miles of hiking trails and a large pond in Panther Hollow. Across from the Phipps Conservatory is Flagstaff Hill, a popular place to watch outdoor movies in the summer.

In the early days of Schenley Park, the area known as "The Oval" was used for horse racing. Today, it has 13 tennis courts, an all weather running track, and a soccer field. There is also an ice skating rink, public swimming pool, and an 18-hole disc golf course nearby.

Schenley Park also contains the Bob O'Connor Golf Course. The golf course includes an indoor practice facility where golfers can play a "virtual" round on Pebble Beach and other famous courses.

Cross country running meets are held in the park. It is the home course for the Carnegie Mellon University men's and women's cross country teams. The 1921 USA Cross Country Championships were held in the park.

== Annual events ==
Since 1983, Schenley Park has been home to a vintage motor sports car race, the Pittsburgh Vintage Grand Prix, that takes place annually in mid-July. Additionally, since 1993, the park has been home to the Komen Pittsburgh Race for the Cure, an annual fundraising event for breast cancer and Mother's Day tradition with more than 35,000 participants. Carnegie Mellon University's annual Spring Carnival contests its Sweepstakes, a buggy race, on Tech Avenue, Schenley Drive, and Frew Street.

== History ==
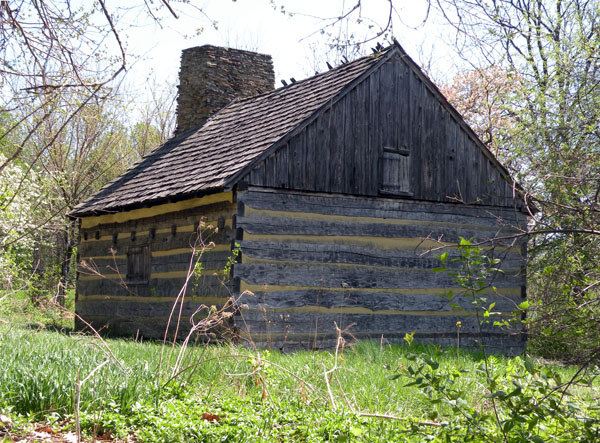
Neill Log House in Schenley Park, built circa 1787 (or before), once belonged to the family of Robert Neill, and later to Col. James O'Hara and his granddaughter Mary Schenley (for whom the park is named).

In 1842, Mary Elizabeth Croghan of Pittsburgh, who was 15 at the time, eloped with 43-year-old Captain Edward Schenley. The couple moved to England. Mary's father attempted to terminate her inheritance in a lawsuit, but was unsuccessful. Mary's maternal grandfather, General James O'Hara, bequeathed to her a parcel of land known as the "Mt. Airy Tract."

Mary's wealth attracted the attention of several land developers in the Pittsburgh area as well as Edward Bigelow, the Director of the Department of Public Works in Pittsburgh. In 1889, Bigelow learned that the agent of a land developer planned to travel to London to attempt to purchase the land from Mary. Bigelow sent an East Liberty lawyer by train to New York City where he then boarded a steamer bound for England. The lawyer beat the real estate agent by two days.

After negotiations with Mary, Bigelow's lawyer entered into an agreement to give 300 acres (120 ha) of the Mt. Airy Tract to the city of Pittsburgh with an option to purchase 120 acres (49 ha) more, under the conditions that the park be named after her and never be sold. The city agreed and immediately purchased the additional land.

Bigelow began to develop the newly renamed Schenley Park for recreational uses. He hired William Falconer to lead the Phipps Conservatory & Botanical Gardens which was built in 1893. In 1895, Andrew Carnegie built the Carnegie Museum and Music Hall, establishing Oakland and Schenley Park as a cultural icon.

Forbes Field, the home field of the Pittsburgh Pirates, was adjacent to Schenley Park during its lifespan (1909–1970).

=== Recent developments ===
- In 2001, after extensive renovations, the Schenley Park Visitor Center opened in one of the park's original buildings. The building had previously served as a tool shed, the home of the Pittsburgh Civic Garden Center, and a nature museum, until closing in the late 1980s.
- In spring 2006, the Schenley Plaza area was converted to its original use as a grand entrance to Schenley Park. Although it was originally designed as a grand entrance, it had been used as a parking lot for many years. The new park area features a carousel and several small food stands.
- In 2022, Judge John McVay approved the removal of the Christopher Columbus statue in Schenley Park. The bronze and granite statue is 13-feet tall, and has stood in the park since 1958. City of Pittsburgh officials decided to remove the statue in 2020 due to Columbus’ association with racism and colonialism. The Italian Sons and Daughters of America challenged this decision, but McVay’s 2022 ruling stated that the city was free to take down the statue.

== Gallery ==
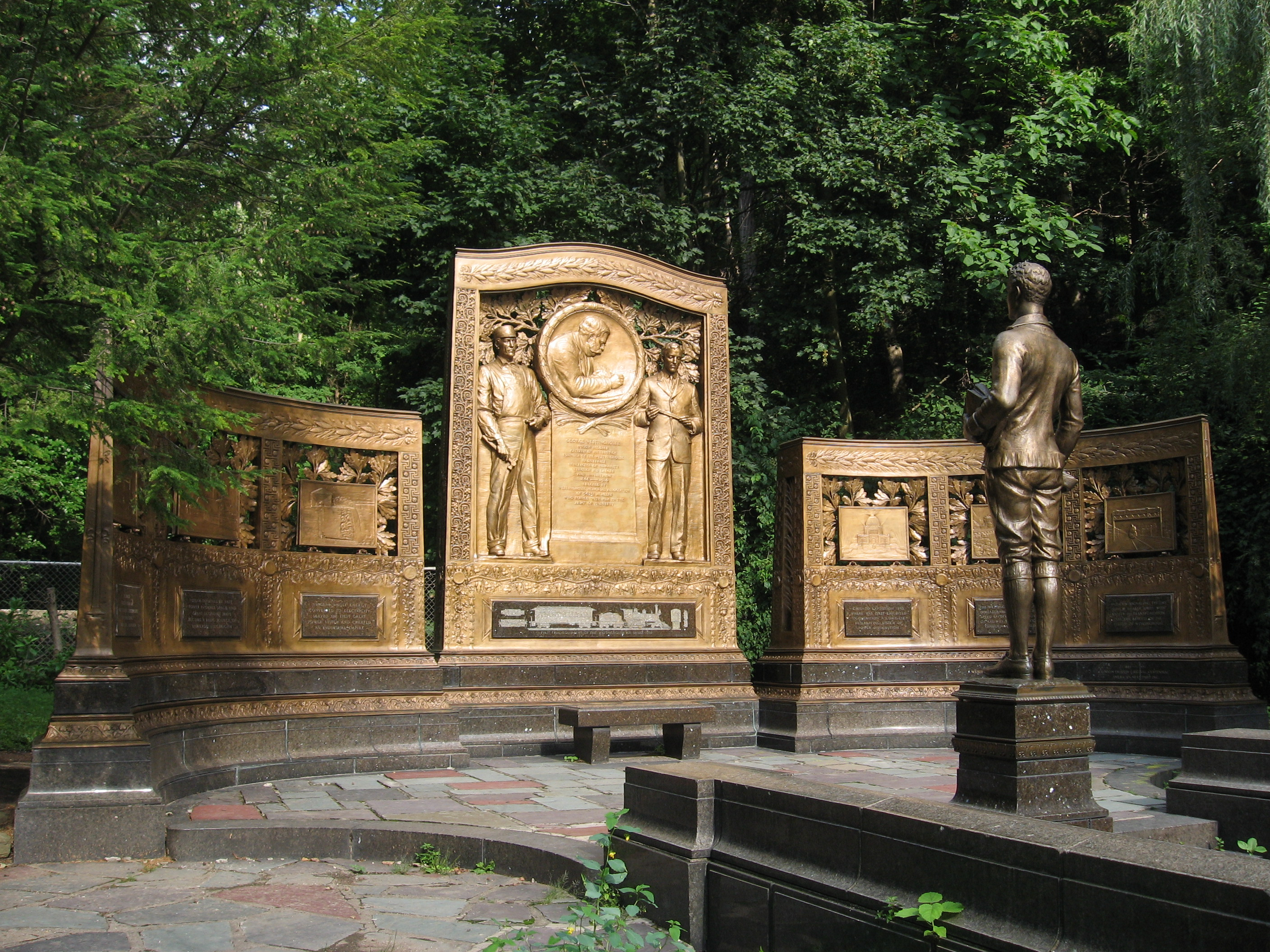
The Westinghouse Memorial in Schenley Park

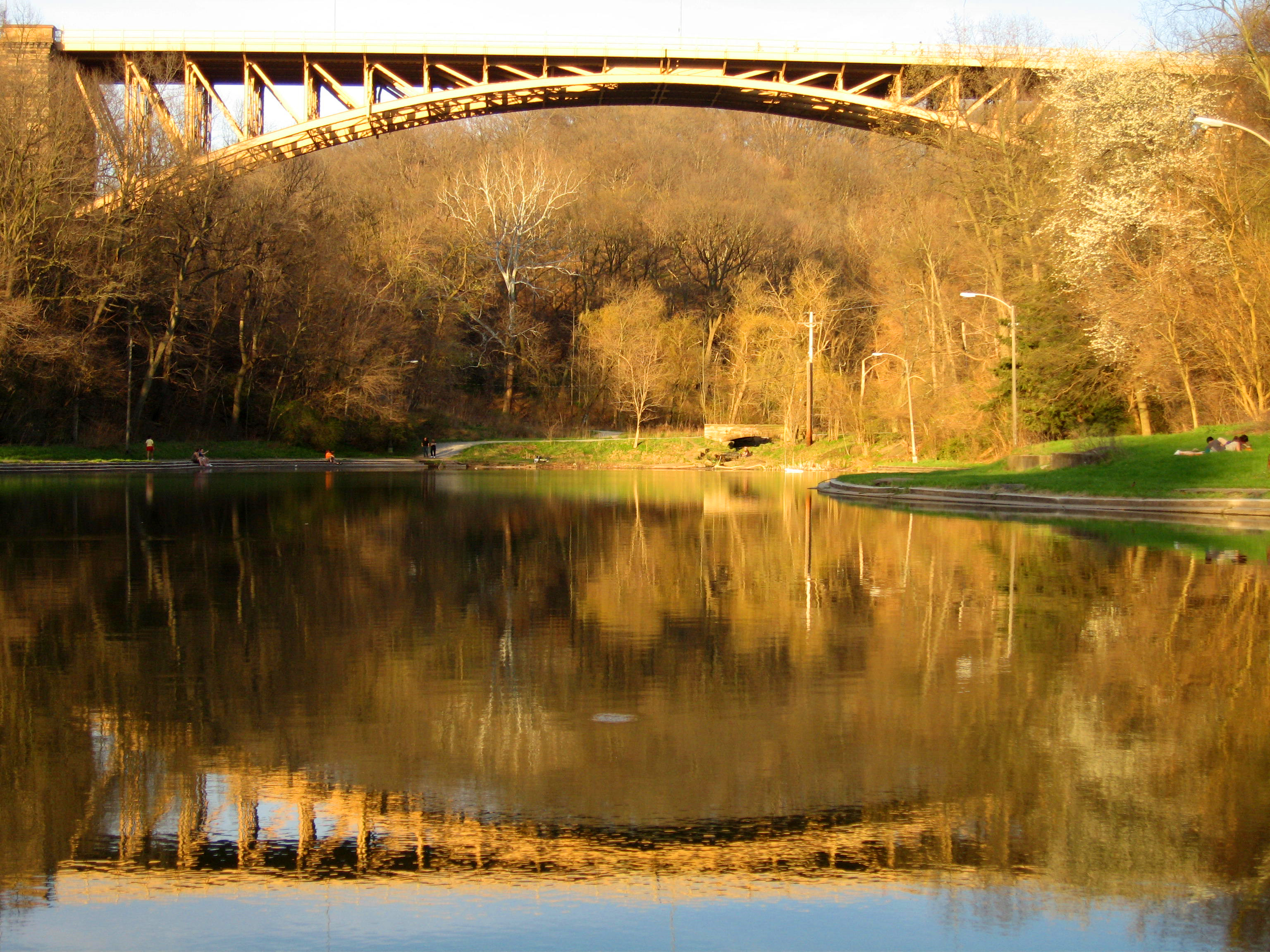
Panther Hollow Bridge seen from Panther Hollow Lake in Schenley Park

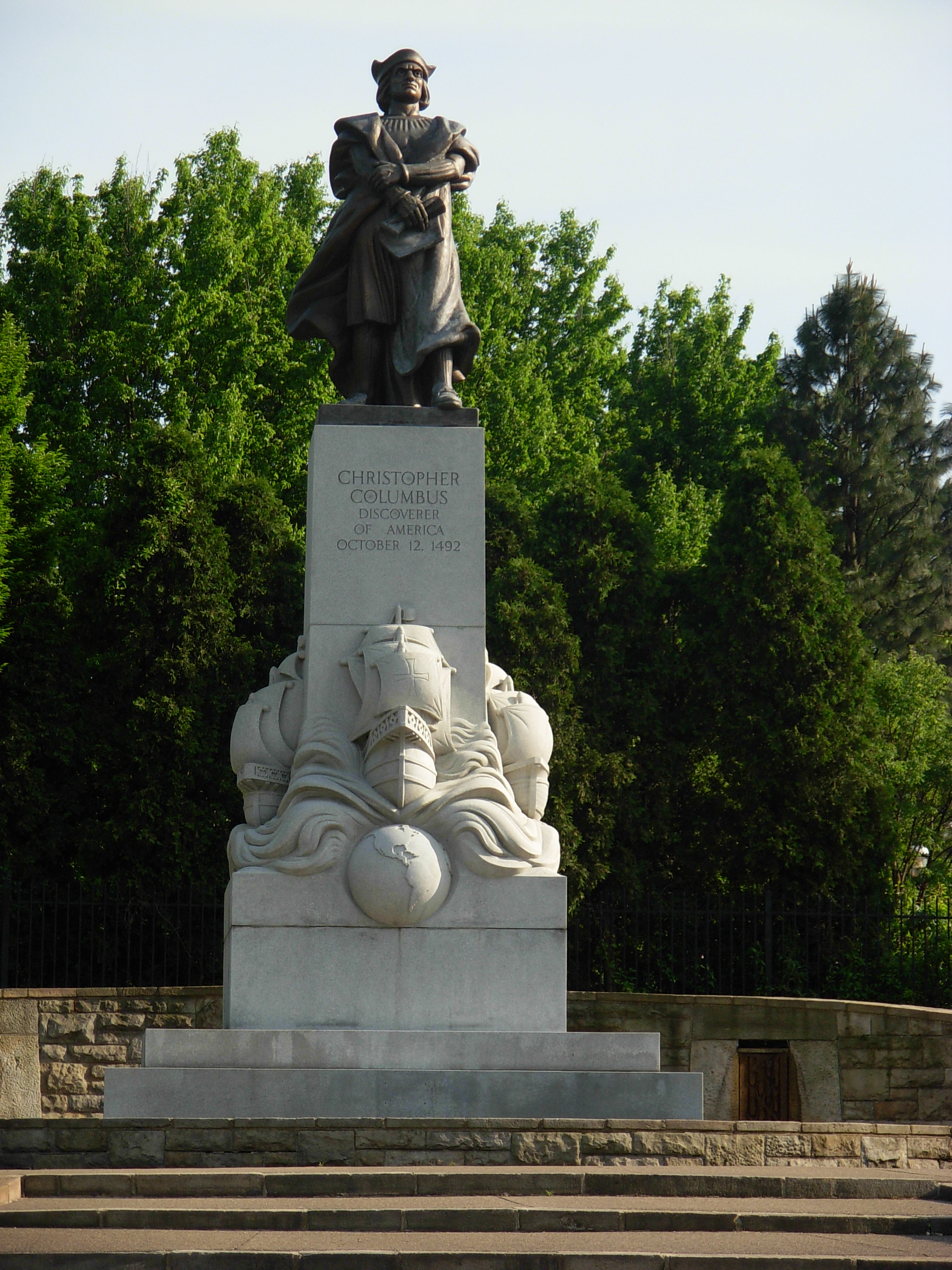
Statue of Christopher Columbus

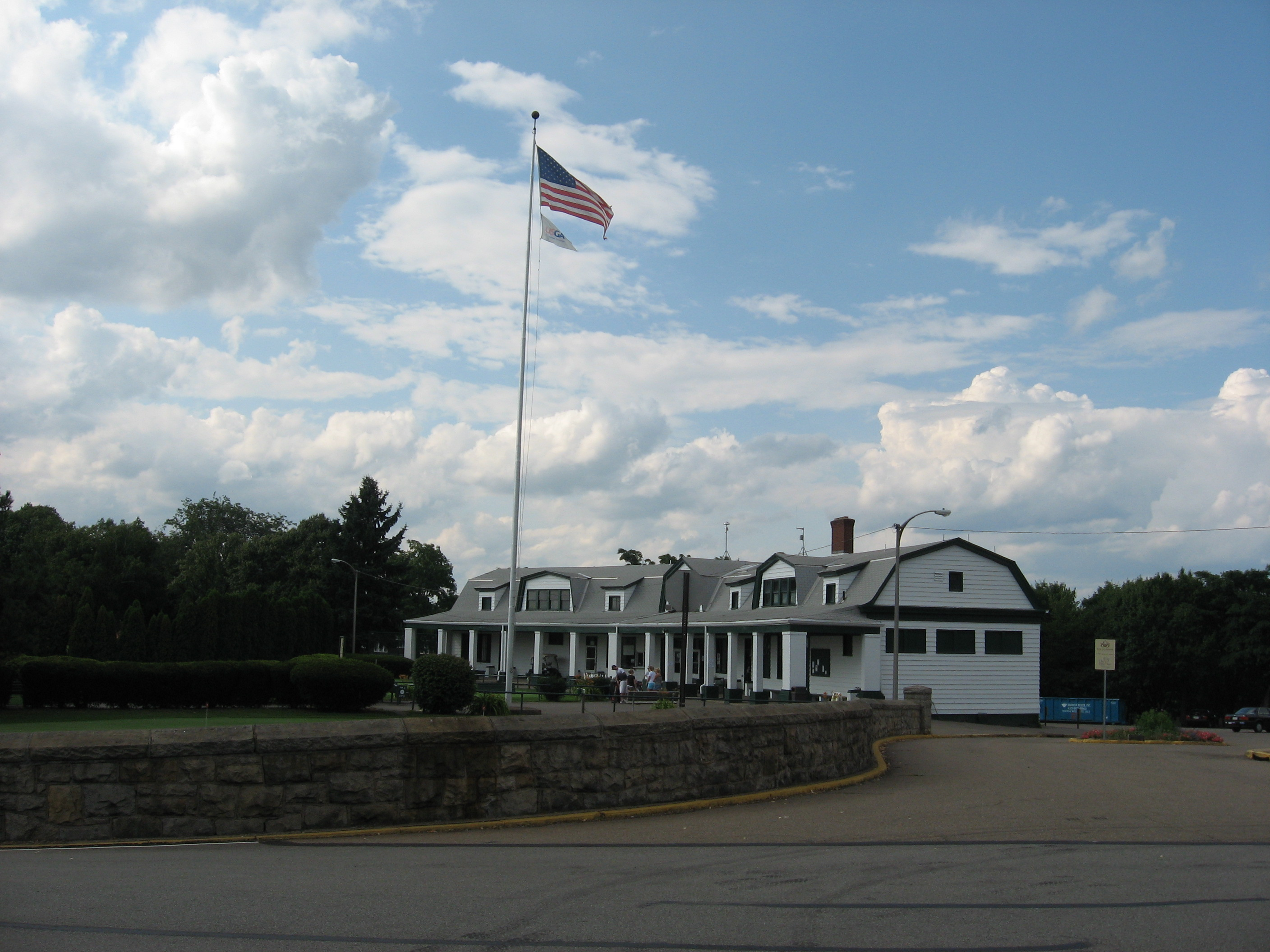
Bob O'Connor Golf Course clubhouse

== See also ==
- Charles Anderson Memorial Bridge
- Carnegie Museums of Pittsburgh
- List of Pittsburgh neighborhoods
