= Hubert Yockey =

American physicist and information theorist

Hubert P. Yockey
- Born: Hubert Palmer Yockey; April 15, 1916; Alexandria, Minnesota, U.S.
- Died: January 31, 2016 (aged 99); Bel Air, Maryland, U.S.
- Education: University of California, Berkeley (A.B., Ph.D.)
- Spouse: Mary Ann Leach (m. 1946; died 2006)
- Scientific career
- Fields: Nuclear physics; Information theory; Bioinformatics
- Workplaces: Radiation Lab, Berkeley; North American Aviation; General Dynamics; Oak Ridge National Laboratory; Aberdeen Proving Ground

Hubert Palmer Yockey (April 15, 1916 – January 31, 2016) was an American physicist and information theorist. He worked under Robert Oppenheimer on the Manhattan Project, and at the University of California, Berkeley.

== Personal life ==
Yockey attended the University of California, Berkeley where he was awarded a bachelors in 1938 and a Ph.D. in 1942. In 1946 he married Mary Ann Leach.

== Career ==
He studied the application of information theory to problems in biology and published his conclusions in the Journal of Theoretical Biology from 1974 onwards. Yockey was very critical of the primordial soup theory of the origin of life, and believed that "the origin of life is unsolvable as a scientific problem". Yockey's work on biology was strongly criticized as "deeply flawed either mathematically, or by the use of inappropriate biological assumptions, or both."

== Death ==
His wife Mary died in 2006. Yockey died on January 31, 2016, at the age of 99.

== Publications ==
- Hubert P. Yockey Information Theory and Molecular Biology 1992 Cambridge University Press, ISBN 978-0521350051
- Hubert P. Yockey, Information Theory, Evolution, and the Origin of Life 2005 Cambridge University Press, ISBN 0-521-80293-8
- Yockey HP. (1981). "Self organization origin of life scenarios and information theory". J Theor Biol. 91 (1): 13–31. Bibcode:1981JThBi..91...13Y. doi:10.1016/0022-5193(81)90370-2. PMID 7300380.
- Yockey, Hubert; Platzman, Robert; Quastler, Henry, eds. (1958). Symposium on Information Theory in Biology. Pergamon Press.

== See also ==
- Mathematical and theoretical biology
- Systems biology
- Entropy and life
