= Alceo Dossena =

Italian sculptor (1878–1937)

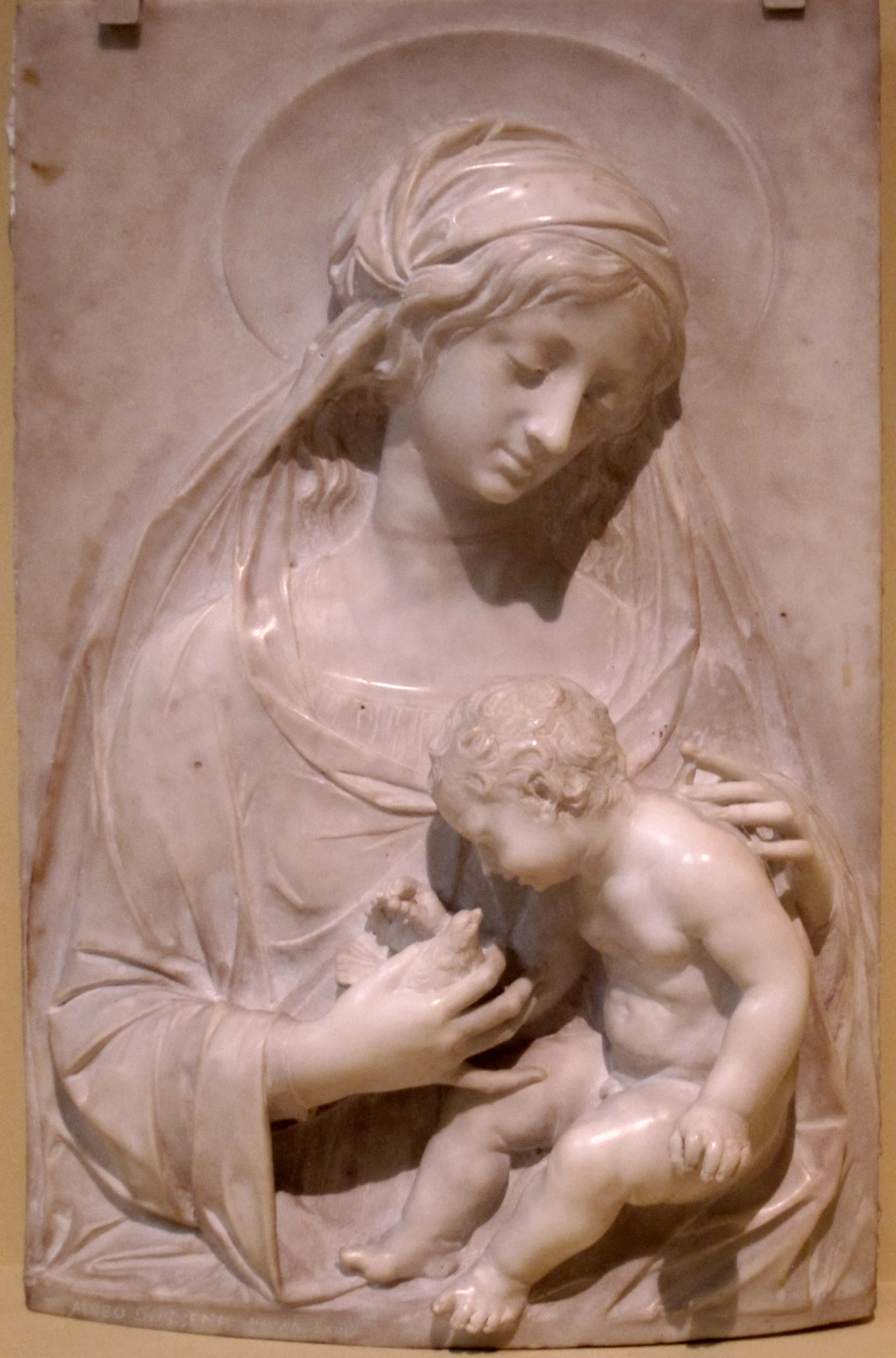
Madonna and Child, marble sculpture by Alceo Dossena, 1930, San Diego Museum of Art

Alceo Dossena (1878–1937) was an Italian sculptor who became well known for his creation of a variety of convincing forgeries of ancient sculptures. His dealers marketed his creations as originals by other sculptors.

== Biography ==
Dossena was born in 1878 in Cremona, Italy. He was a talented stonemason and sculptor, and was so skilled at duplicating classical and medieval art that his agent, Alfredo Fasoli, sold his works as authentic antiques. Fasoli commissioned copies of Greek, Roman, medieval, and Renaissance sculptures, and of works by such artists as Giovanni Pisano, Simone Martini, and Donatello. Dossena was meagerly paid by Fasoli, who made an immense profit off the copies he sold to museums and collectors. One of the fakes was a sculpted tomb attributed to Mino da Fiesole that was sold to the Boston Museum of Fine Arts.

In 1928, Dossena discovered that some of his works were displayed in museum collections as original antiquities, and that his dealers were keeping most of the profit for themselves. The artist was only paid the equivalent of $200 per sale. He exposed the ruse and sued his dealers. Dossena defended himself against forgery charges by claiming that he had been unaware that others were selling his work under false claims. A trial cleared him, and he received the equivalent of $66,000 in compensation.

His subsequent exhibit in the New York Metropolitan Museum of Art was unsuccessful. In 1933, the Italian government auctioned 39 of his works for the modest sum of $9000, while a forgery of his sold at a peak price of $150,000.

Alceo Dossena died a poor man in Rome in 1937.

== Collections ==
Two of Dossena's sculptures are on permanent display in the Frick Fine Arts Building at the University of Pittsburgh. They were intended to appear as if they had been mounted on a Renaissance church, carved by Simone Martini. The subject matter is the Virgin Mary and angel Gabriel.

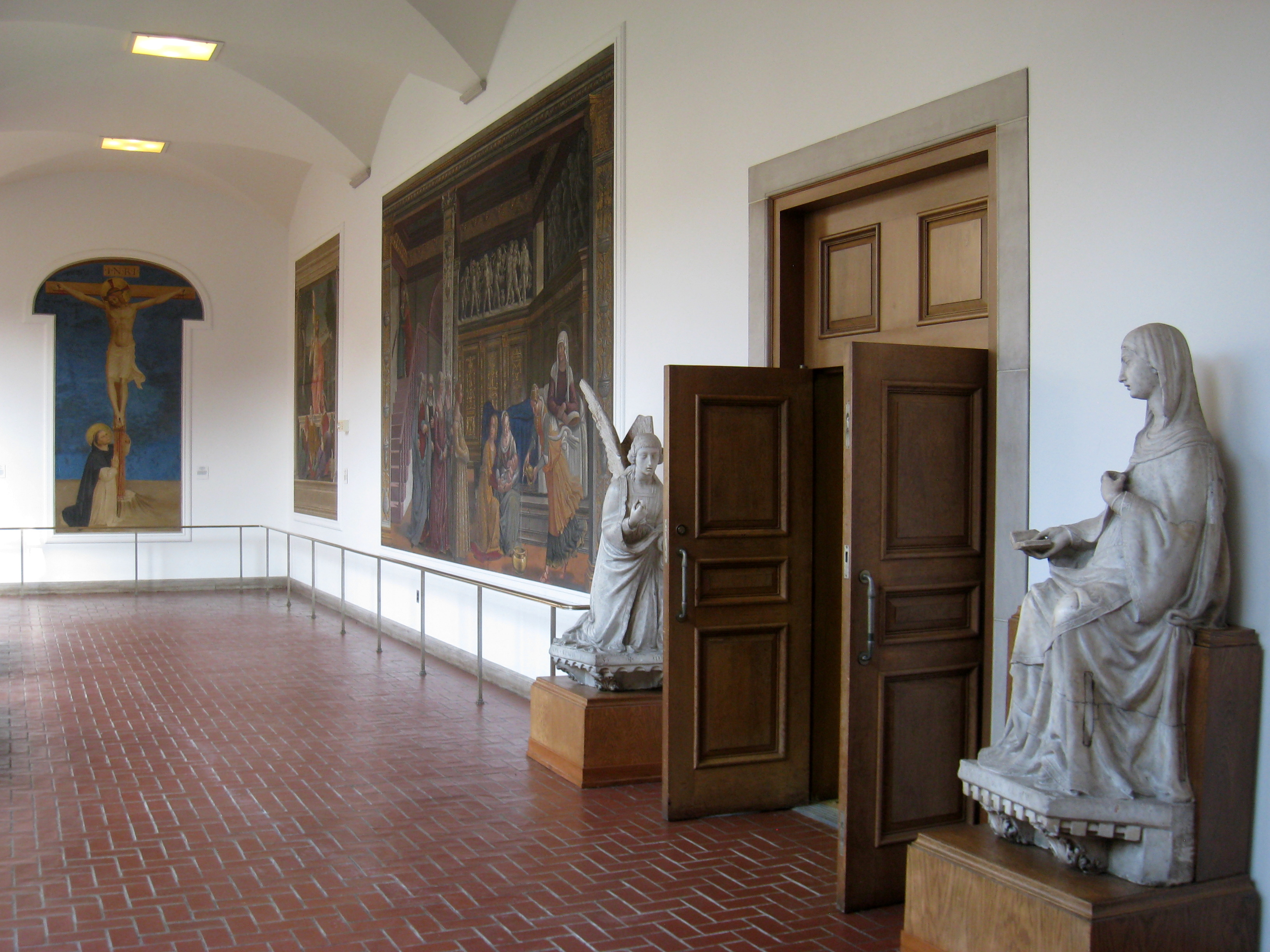
Alceo Dossena statues at the University of Pittsburgh.
