= Henry Quastler =

Austrian medical doctor

- Born: November 11, 1908
- Died: July 4, 1963 (aged 54)
- Occupation: Medical doctor
- Known for: Information theory in biology
- Spouse: Gertrude Quastler

Henry Quastler (November 11, 1908 – July 4, 1963) was an Austrian medical doctor and radiologist who became a pioneer in the field of information theory applied to biology after emigrating to America. His work with Sidney Dancoff led to the publication of what is now commonly called Dancoff's Law.

== Life ==
Quastler spent his early career in Vienna as a doctor. He received his medical degree in Vienna in 1932, focusing on histology and radiology. He met his wife, Gertrude Quastler, a milliner, when she came to him for treatment for tuberculosis. They married in 1933. The couple moved to Albania when King Zog asked for Quastler to train up radiologists. While there he also worked on malaria. Quastler's malaria expertise earned him a place on the International Health Board. As World War II approached in 1939, the couple left Albania and traveled to America. Within a year Quastler was working as a radiologist at New Rochelle Hospital in New York. In 1942, the Quastlers relocated to Urbana, Illinois, where Henry was employed as chief radiologist at Carle Hospital Clinic. While in Illinois, Gertrude Quastler studied art. She soon became a noted artist. Henry also painted as an amateur. According to his sister Johanna, the couple sometimes exhibited together.

In 1949, Quastler gave up his medical practice to concentrate on science. Heinz von Foerster, who knew Quastler well, said that he became even more interested in radiation after the invention of the atomic bomb, which he considered "a horrifying human catastrophe". Foerster recalled Quastler pondering: "[Quastler asked] 'Can I now, as a working person, find out what damage has been done by the radiation of atomic bombs?'—that was his research question. Thus he started to conduct experiments on radiation damage in living organisms." ... Henry Quastler learned the basic concepts and formalisms of information theory with a speed that was almost unbelievable. And why? Because he needed this instrument urgently."

In the 1940s Quastler met Dancoff and collaborated with him to develop information theory in biology. They were interested in the problem of how to define the information content of a gene. After Dancoff's death, Quastler organized the symposium Information Theory in Biology, founded by him in 1952. Quastler soon became interested in how information theory could be used to understand the origin of life. In 1953 he edited Information Theory in Biology. He edited another collection of essays, Information Theory in Psychology: Problems and Methods, in 1956. That same year he helped to organize the Symposium on Information Theory in Biology in Gatlinburg, Tennessee which two years later resulted in an eponymous book.

Despite his best efforts, his wife's tuberculosis slowly worsened. A deterioration in his wife's health led Quastler to take a job at Brookhaven National Laboratory in New York, where he continued to work on both radiation and information biology. When his wife died in 1963, Quastler was devastated. He took an overdose of pills, laid down beside her and held her hand until he died. Richard Diebenkorn later said, "Neither my wife nor I can think of a couple we encountered more indivisible." Heinz von Foerster said of Quastler that he was "an exceptionally conscientious, ethically and morally conscious human being."

== Work with Dancoff ==
In Foerster's words Quastler and Dancoff attempted to answer the following problem:

How many bits have to go in there? And what is the informational content of that which produces these bits? What—in the language of information theory—is the relationship between the quantity of diversity or complexity that this system can create and give rise to, and the quantity of diversity or complexity with which it itself has been built?

According to Lily E. Kay, Quastler and Dancoff created "the first technical application of the Weiner-Shannon theory in genetics." Quastler and Dancoff proposed that the replication errors inevitable in biological reproduction must be held in check by a statistical process that functioned as a "checking device" within the gene. Quastler compared this to the system of "checks and balances" in the American constitution. The proposition known as "Dancoff's Law" emerged from this work. A non-mathematical statement of this law is, "the greatest growth occurs when the greatest number of mistakes are made consistent with survival".

== The Emergence of Biological Organization ==
In 1964 Quastler's book The Emergence of Biological Organization was published posthumously. In 2002, Harold J. Morowitz described it as a "remarkably prescient book" which is "surprisingly contemporary in outlook". In it Quastler pioneers a theory of emergence, developing model of "a series of emergences from probionts to prokaryotes".

The work is based on lectures given by Quastler during the spring term of 1963, when he was Visiting Professor of Theoretical Biology at Yale University. In these lectures Quastler argued that the formation of single-stranded polynucleotides was well within the limits of probability of what could have occurred during the pre-biologic period of the Earth. However, he noted that polymerization of a single-stranded polymer from mononucleotides is slow, and its hydrolysis is fast; therefore in a closed system consisting only of mononucleotides and their single-stranded polymers, only a small fraction of the available molecules will be polymerized. However, a single-stranded polymer may form a double-stranded one by complementary polymerization, using a single-stranded polynucleotide as a template. Such a process is relatively fast and the resulting double-stranded polynucleotide is much more stable than the single single-stranded one since each monomer is bound not only along the sugar phosphate backbone, but also through inter-strand bonding between the bases.

The capability for self-replication, a fundamental feature of life, emerged when double-stranded polynucleotides disassociated into single-stranded ones and each of these served as a template for synthesis of a complementary strand, producing two double-stranded copies. Such a system is mutable since random changes of individual bases may occur and be propagated. Individual replicators with different nucleotide sequences may also compete with each other for nucleotide precursors. Mutations that influence the folding state of polynucleotides may affect the ratio of association of strands to dissociation and thus the ability to replicate. The folding state would also affect the stability of the molecule. These ideas were then developed to speculate on the emergence of genetic information, protein synthesis and other general features of life.

Lily E. Kay says that Quastler's works "are an illuminating example of a well reasoned epistemic quest and a curious disciplinary failure". Quastler's aspiration to create an information based biology was innovative, but his work was "plagued by problems: outdated data, unwarranted assumptions, some dubious numerology, and, most importantly, an inability to generate an experimental agenda." However Quastler's "discursive framework" survived.

Forty-five years after Quastler's 1964 proposal, Lincoln and Joyce described a cross-catalytic system that involves two ribozymes (RNA enzymes) that catalyze each other's synthesis from a total of four component substrates. This synthesis occurred in the absence of protein and could provide the basis for an artificial genetic system.

== Publications ==
- Henry Quastler, ed. (1953). Information Theory in Biology. Urbana: University of Illinois Press.
- Yockey, Hubert; Platzman, Robert; Quastler, Henry, eds. (1958). Symposium on Information Theory in Biology. Pergamon Press.
- Quastler, Henry (1964). The Emergence of Biological Organization. Yale University Press.
- Augenstein, Leroy G.; Mason, Ronald; Quastler, Henry, eds. (1964). Advances in Radiation Biology, Volume 1. New York: Academic Press.
