= Victor David Brenner =

American sculptor, engraver, and medalist (1871–1924)

- Brenner around 1910
- Born: Avigdor David Brenner; June 12, 1871; Šiauliai, Russian Empire (now Lithuania)
- Died: April 5, 1924 (aged 52); New York City, New York, United States
- Resting place: Mount Judah Cemetery Ridgewood, Queens, U.S.
- Citizenship: Russian Empire (1871-1896); United States (from 1896)
- Occupations: Sculptor, engraver, medalist
- Known for: Designing the Lincoln cent

Victor David Brenner (born Avigdor David Brenner; June 12, 1871 – April 5, 1924) was a Lithuanian-born American sculptor, engraver and medalist known primarily as the designer of the United States Lincoln cent.

== Biography ==
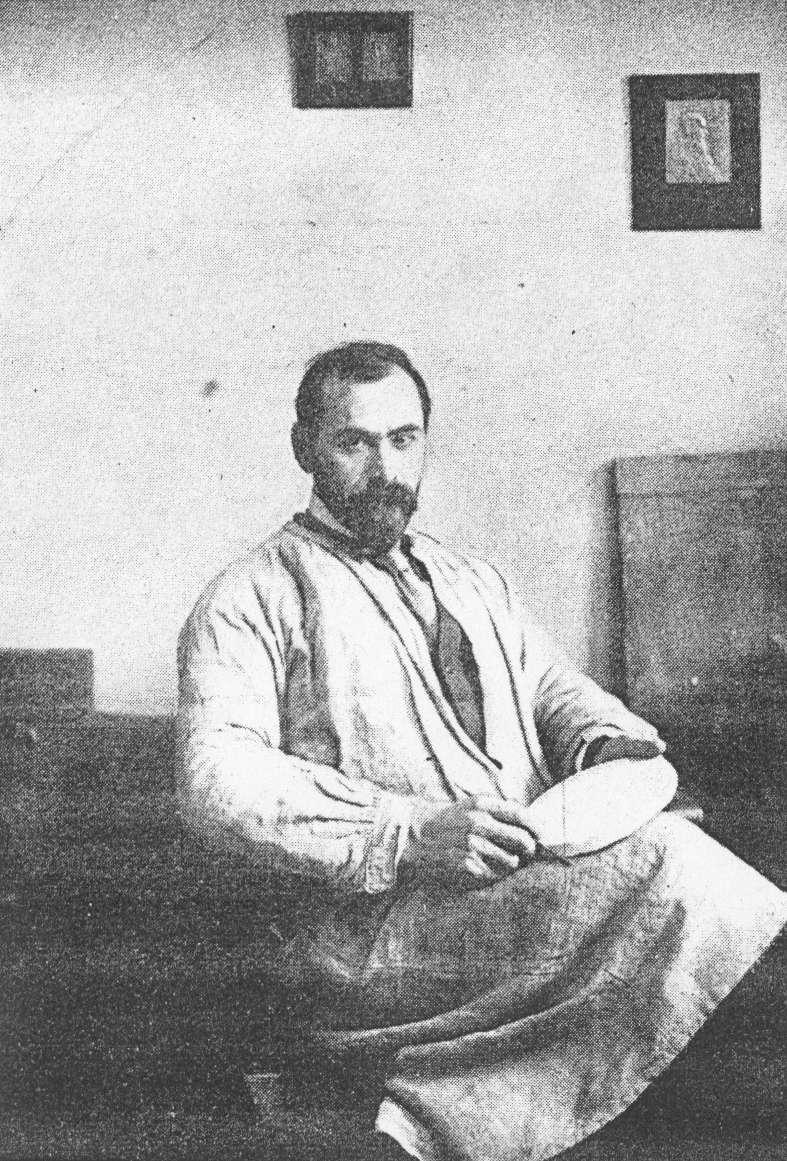
Portrait of Victor David Brenner seated in a studio-like setting with a plaster model of the large design for the Lincoln cent.

Brenner was born to Jewish parents in Shavel, Lithuania, Russian Empire. His name at birth was Avigdor David Brenner ("Avigdor ben Gershon," in Hebrew, as his gravestone attests), but he changed the name to Victor David Brenner.

Brenner emigrated to the United States in 1890, living mostly in the New York City area. He arrived with little more to fall back on but the trade his father taught him — gem and seal engraving. This technical preparation included the tools of the sculptor's craft. He took night classes at Cooper Union and soon learned English as he had learned French.

Eight years later Brenner was in Paris, studying with the great French medalist Oscar Roty at the Académie Julian. There he exhibited his work and obtained awards at the Paris Exposition of 1900. He returned to the United States, where his career prospered.

Brenner died in 1924 and is buried at Mount Judah Cemetery, Ridgewood, Queens, New York.

== Lincoln cent ==
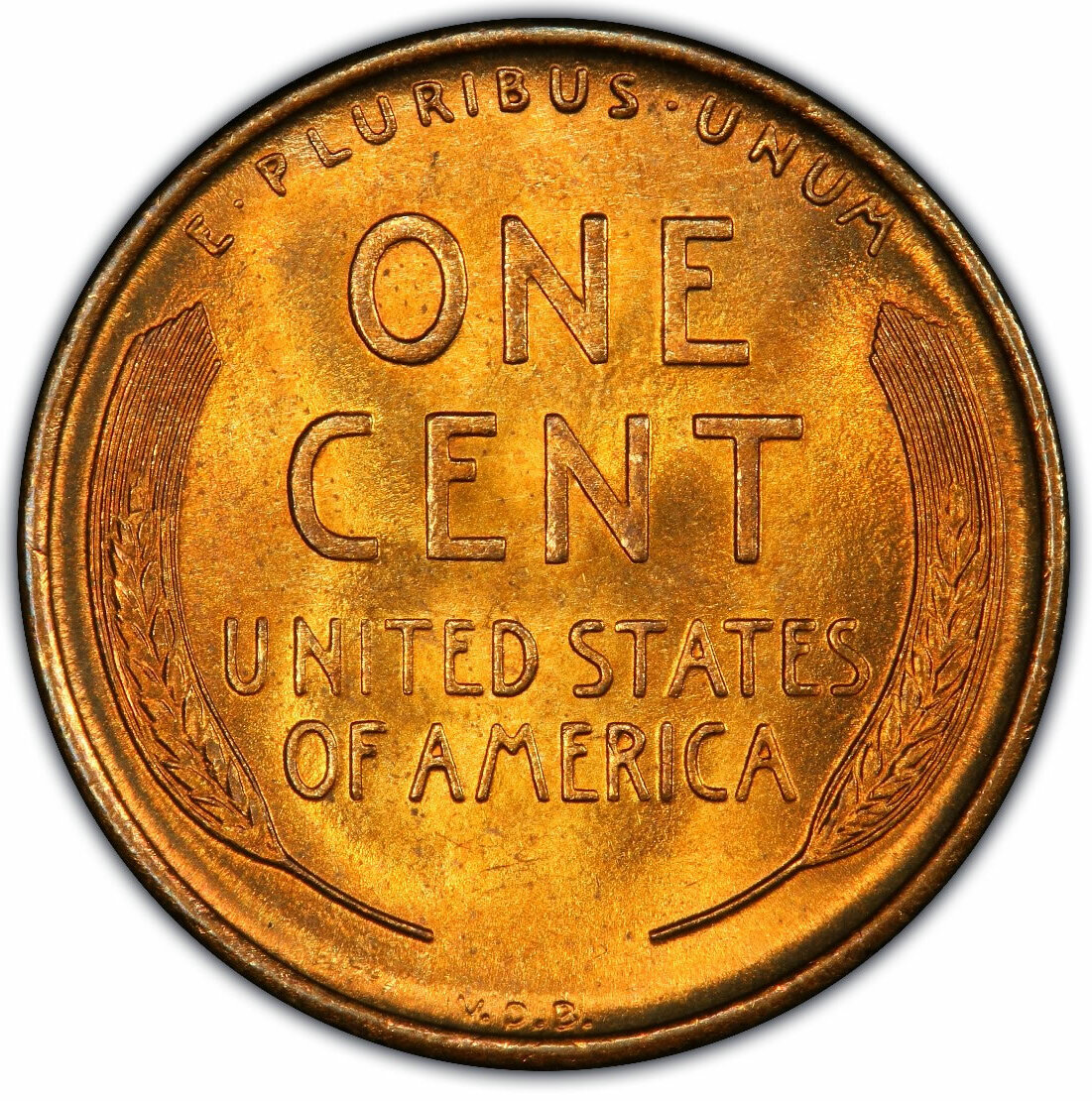
1909 Lincoln Cent, showing the initial placement of the initials of Victor David Brenner. They were later moved to the obverse.

Brenner is probably best known for his enduring Lincoln coin design, the obverse of which is the longest-running design in United States Mint history, and perhaps the most reproduced piece of art in world history. His design was picked by President Theodore Roosevelt, who had earlier posed for him in New York. Since immigrating 18 years earlier, he had become one of the nation's premier medalists. Roosevelt had learned of his talents in a settlement house on New York City's Lower East Side and was immediately impressed with a bas-relief that Brenner had made of Lincoln, based on the early Civil War era photographer, Mathew Brady's photograph.

Roosevelt, who considered Lincoln the savior of the Union and the greatest Republican president, and also considered himself Lincoln's political heir, ordered the new Lincoln penny to be based on Brenner's work and that it be produced to commemorate Lincoln's 100th birthday in 1909. The likeness of President Lincoln on the obverse of the coin is an adaptation of a plaque Brenner executed several years earlier and which had come to the attention of President Roosevelt in New York.

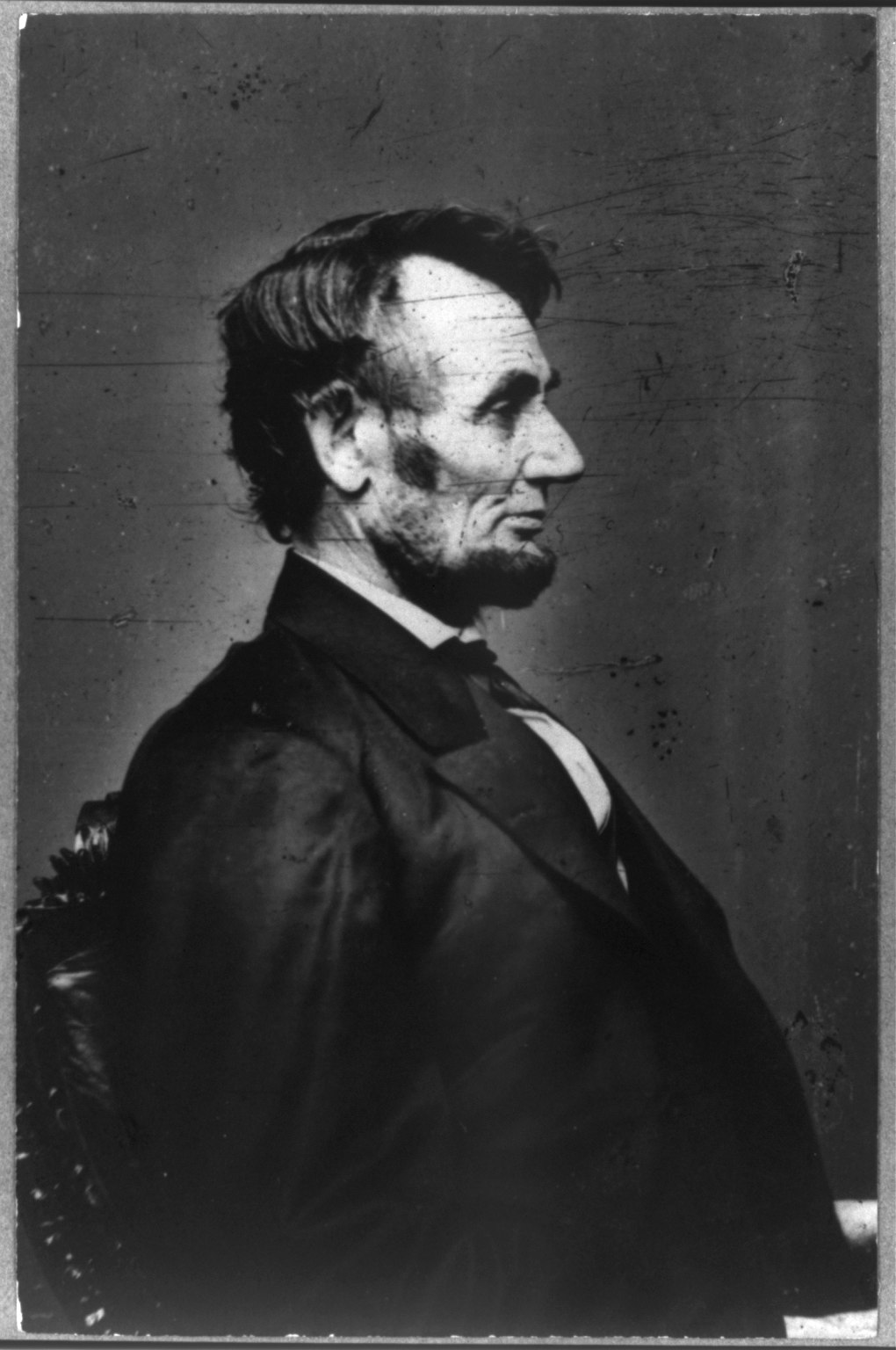
Lincoln portrait

Bronze bas-reliefs dated 1907 and signed by Brenner have been identified and some sold in auctions for as much as $3,900.

Charles Eliot Norton of Harvard, whom Brenner counted among his friends, gave the sculptor an unpublished portrait of Lincoln which served Brenner as a basis for Lincoln's features. He also examined other portraits.

When Brenner forwarded the model of the Lincoln cent to the Director of the Mint, the design bore his whole name, after the fashion of the signatures on the coinage of other countries, notably on the gold coins which Oscar Roty designed for France. The director had the initials substituted for the name.

Following the precedent of James B. Longacre, whose initials "JBL" (or simply "L") graced a number of U.S. coin designs for much of the latter half of the 19th century, Brenner placed his initials "VDB" at the bottom of the reverse between the wheat ear stalks.

Widespread criticism of the initials' prominence resulted in their removal midway through 1909, the design's first year of issue. In 1918, they returned as small letters below Lincoln's shoulder, where they remain today. Incorporation of a designer's initials into a coin design is now commonplace in America.

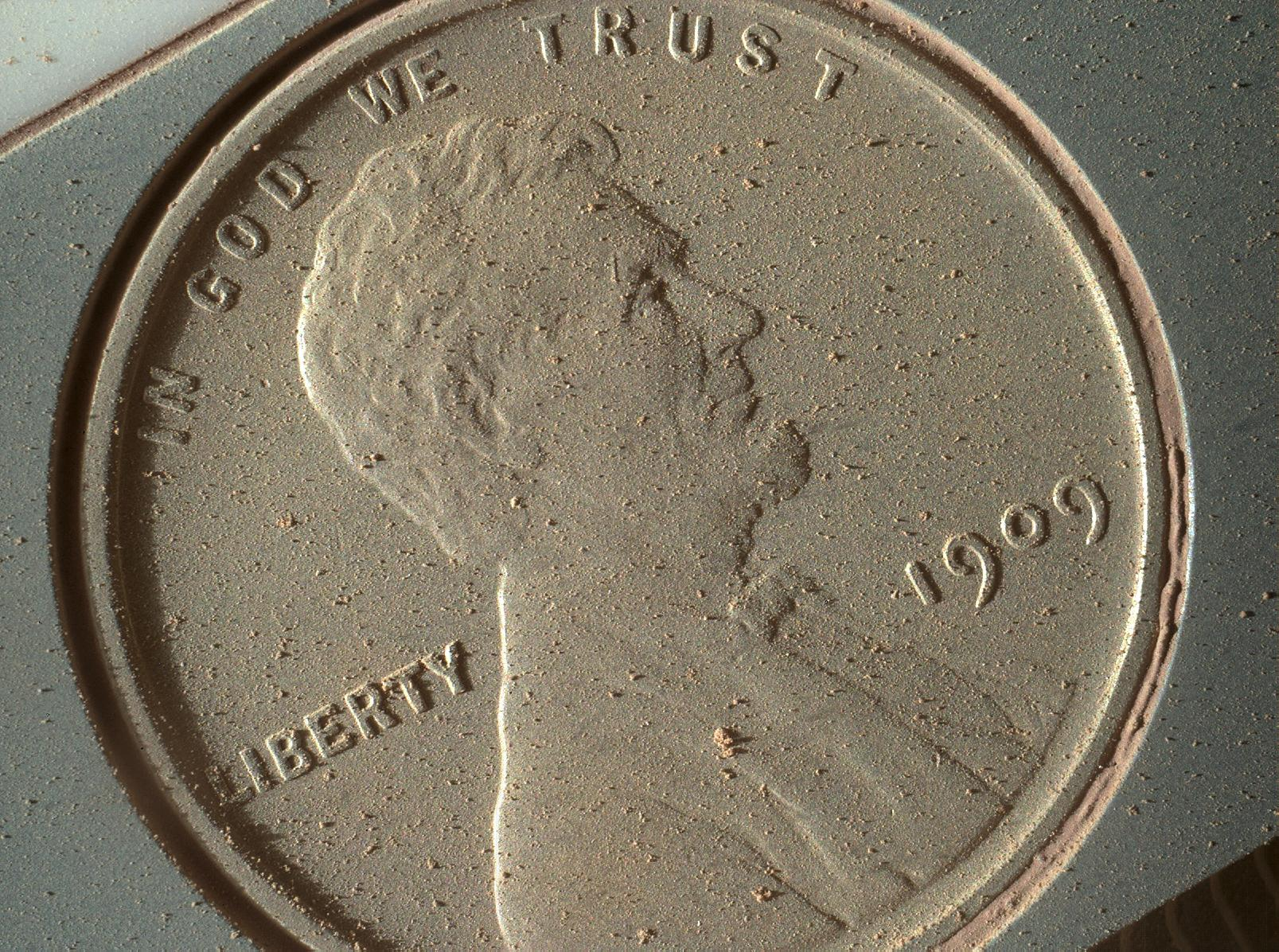
1909 VDB penny on Mars attached to the Curiosity rover, covered in Martian dust despite its vertical mounting position

A 1909 VDB US cent is mounted on the calibration target on the Mars Curiosity rover. This is a nod to the rover's geologic mission and the common practice by geologists including a coin in photographs to document the size of objects.

== "Baranauskas" ==
Several sources claim that Brenner's original name was "Viktoras Baranauskas" (or "Barnauskas"). In a 2000 article in Draugas, Lithuanian-American historical researcher Edward Baranauskas described this as a "fable" — one which Lithuanian numismatist Jonas K. Karys "spent many years exposing (...) as a fabrication". Baranauskas traced the claim to a 1929 speech given by Alexander M. Rackus, and noted that "(u)nfortunately, [Rackus] could not substantiate much of what he said."

== Works ==
Some of Brenner's most noteworthy sculptural works include:

1. Rev. Dr Muhlenberg Medal (issued by the American Numismatic and Archaeological Society)
2. Portrait-plaquette of Fridtjof Nansen
3. Portrait medallion of J. Sanford Saltus
4. Portrait medallion of C. Delacour
5. Portrait-plaquette of Abraham Lincoln (used in the Lincoln cent design)
6. Portrait medallion of Theodore Roosevelt used on the Panama Canal Service Medal
7. Portrait medallion of Prince Heinrich of Prussia (1902)
8. Portrait bas-relief of John Paul Jones
9. Portrait bas-relief of Carl Schurz
10. Bust of Charles Eliot Norton
11. Seal of the New York Public Library
12. Portrait of Spencer Trask.
13. A Song to Nature in Schenley Plaza at the University of Pittsburgh

== See also ==
- List of Saltus Award winners

== Gallery ==
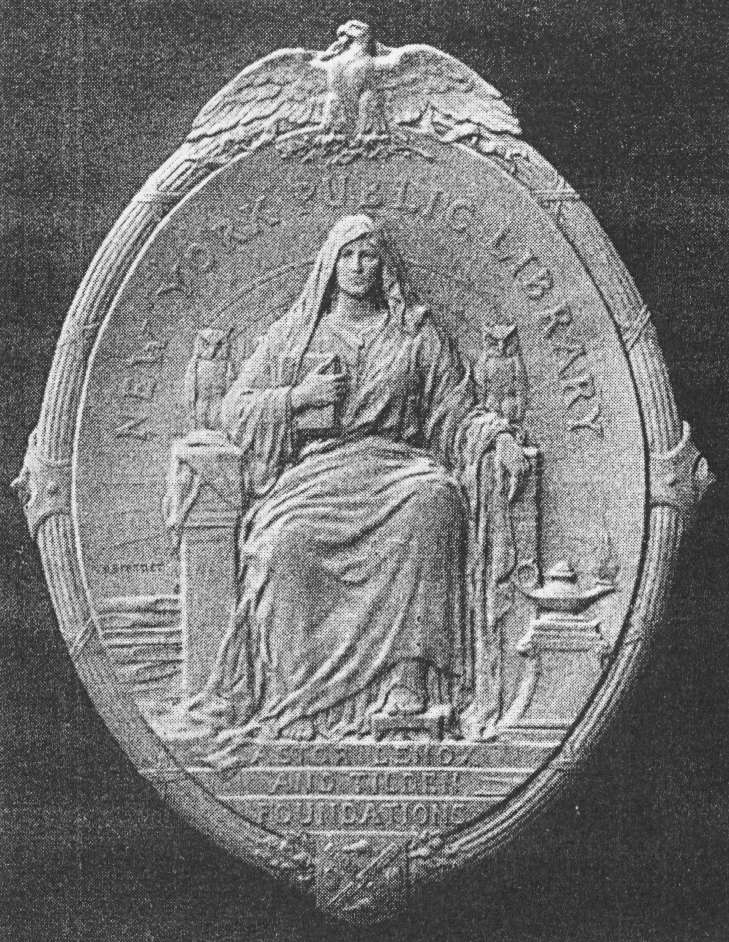
Seal designed for the New York Public Library

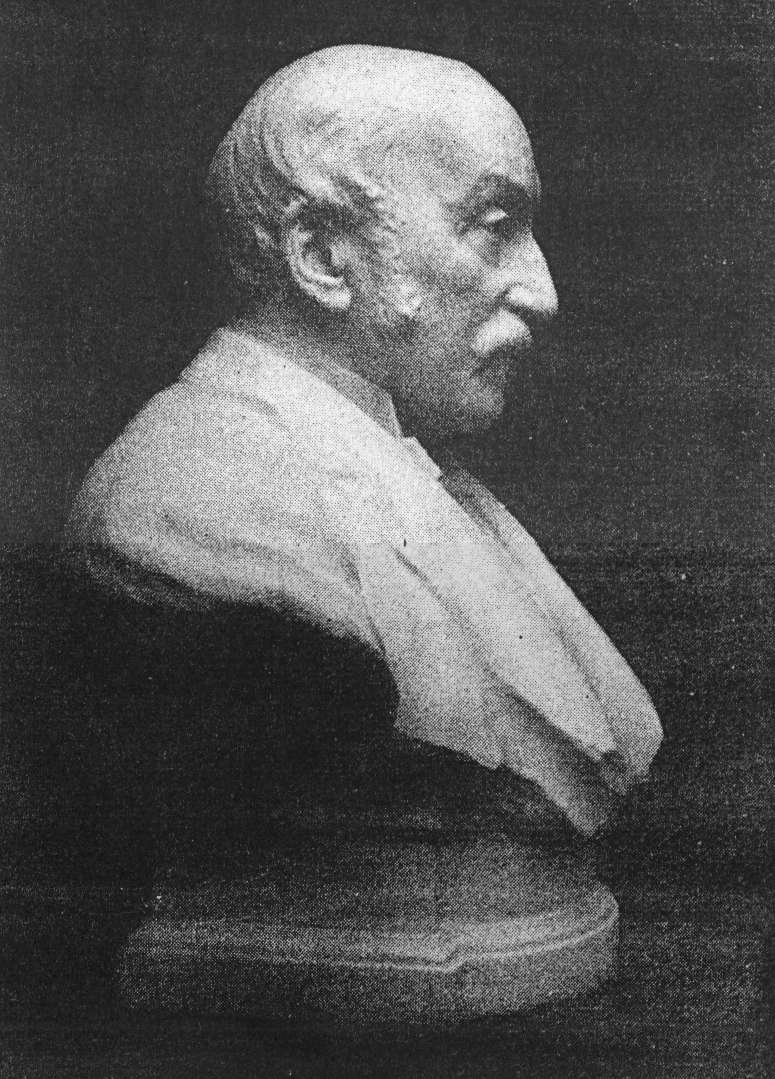
Bust of Charles Eliot Norton

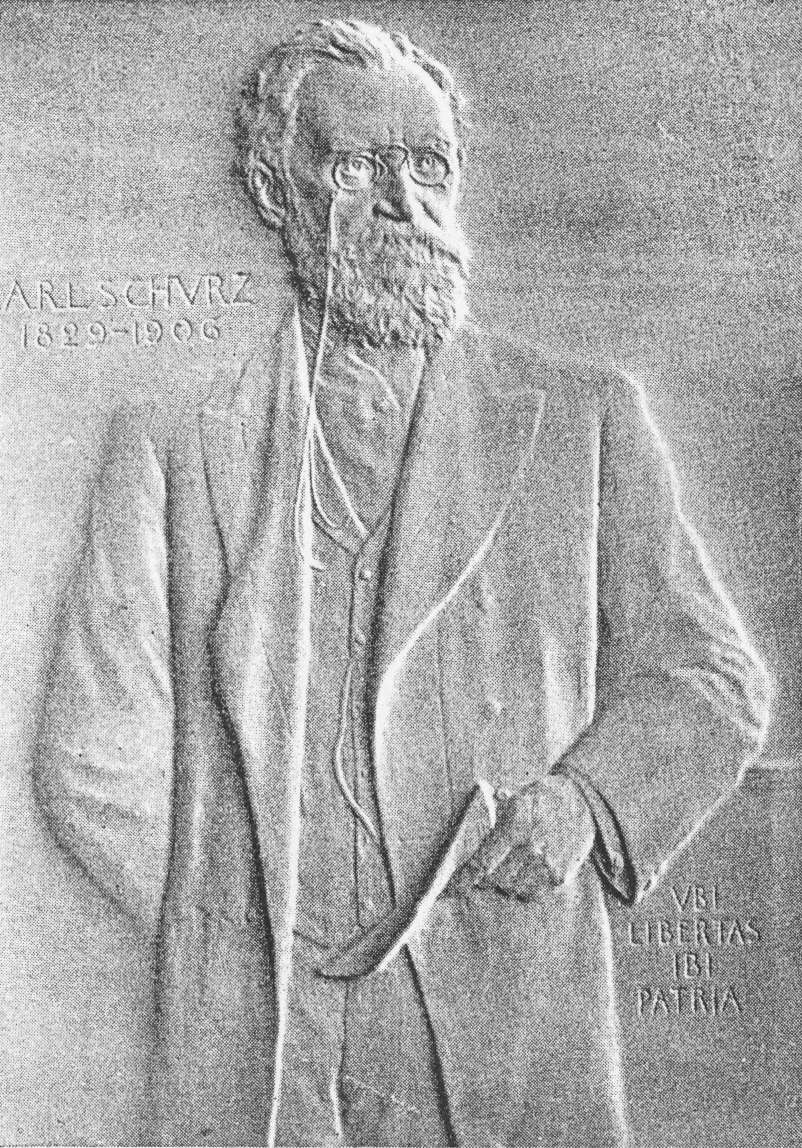
Bas-relief of Carl Schurz

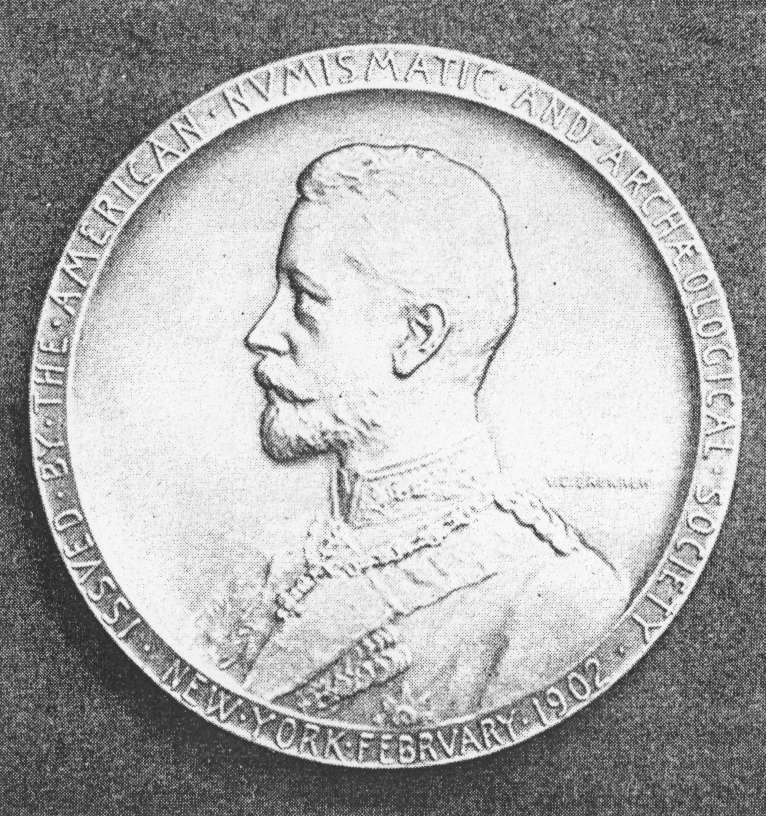
Medallion designed for the visit of Prince Heinrich of Prussia in 1902

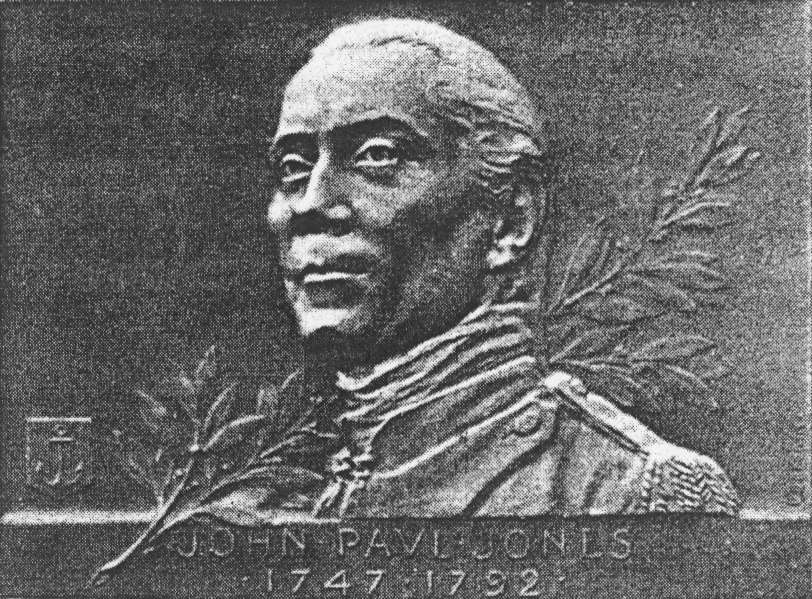
Bas-relief of John Paul Jones

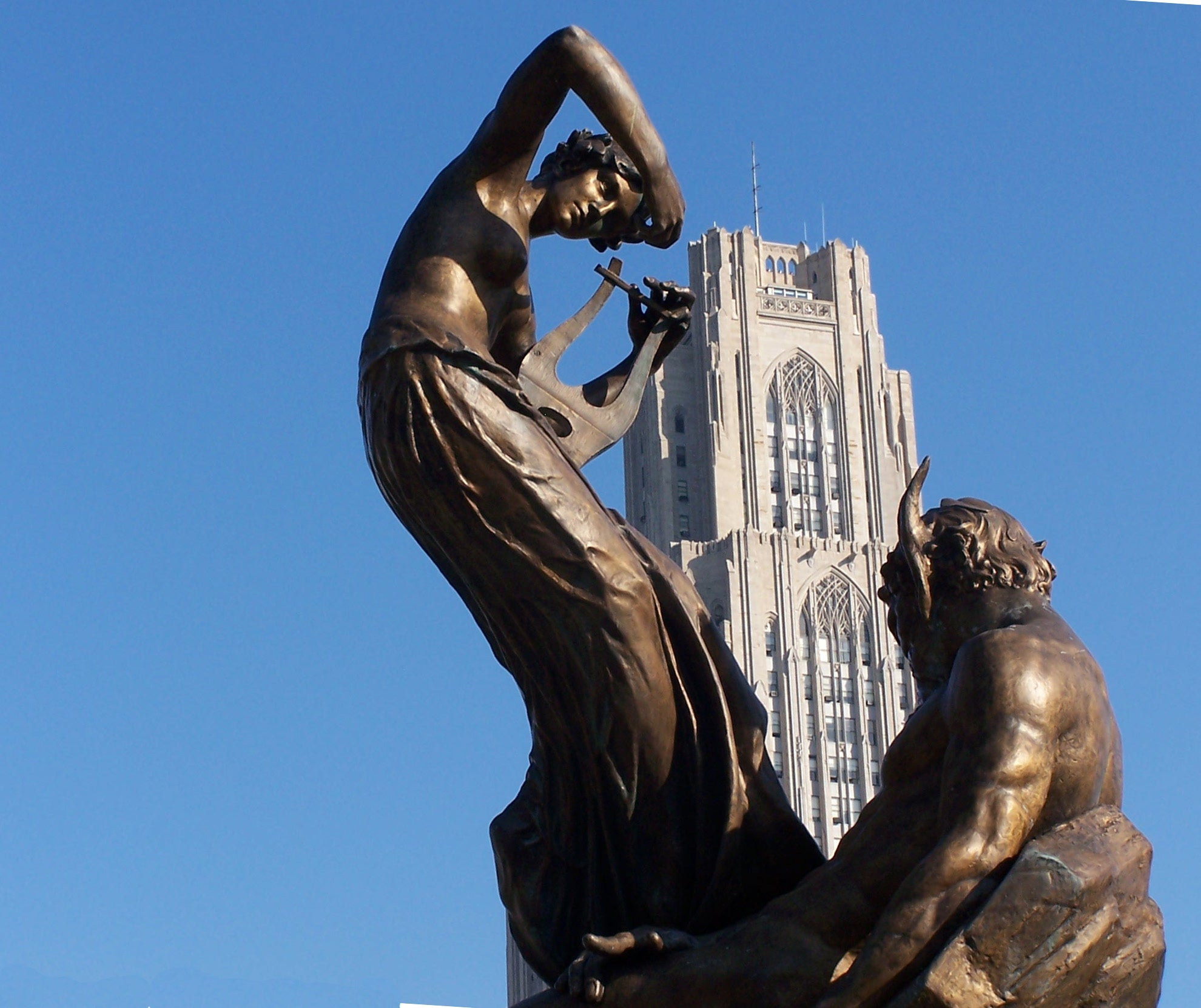
A Song to Nature, part of the Mary Schenley Memorial Fountain located in Pittsburgh, was Brenner's first large sculpture in the round

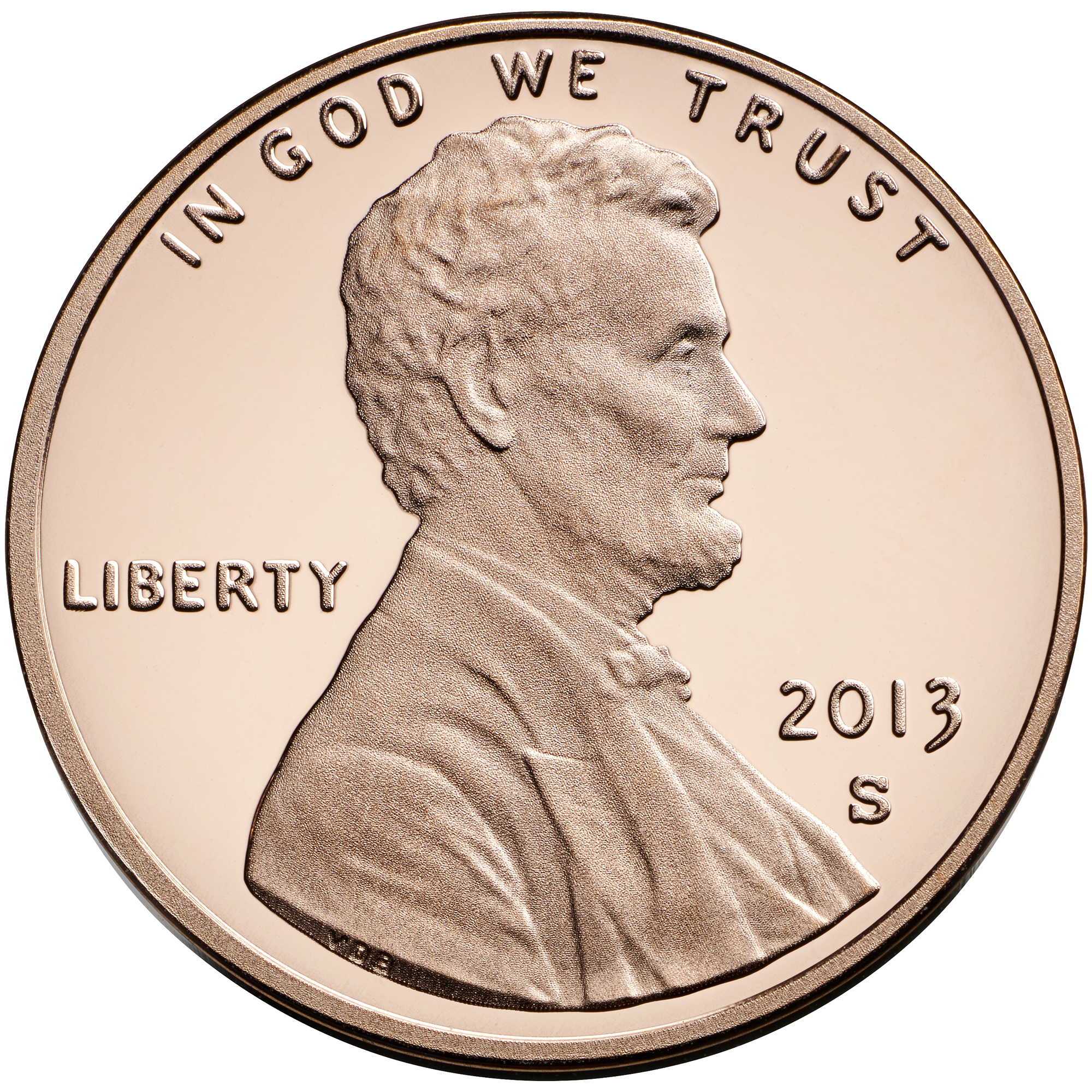
US One Cent

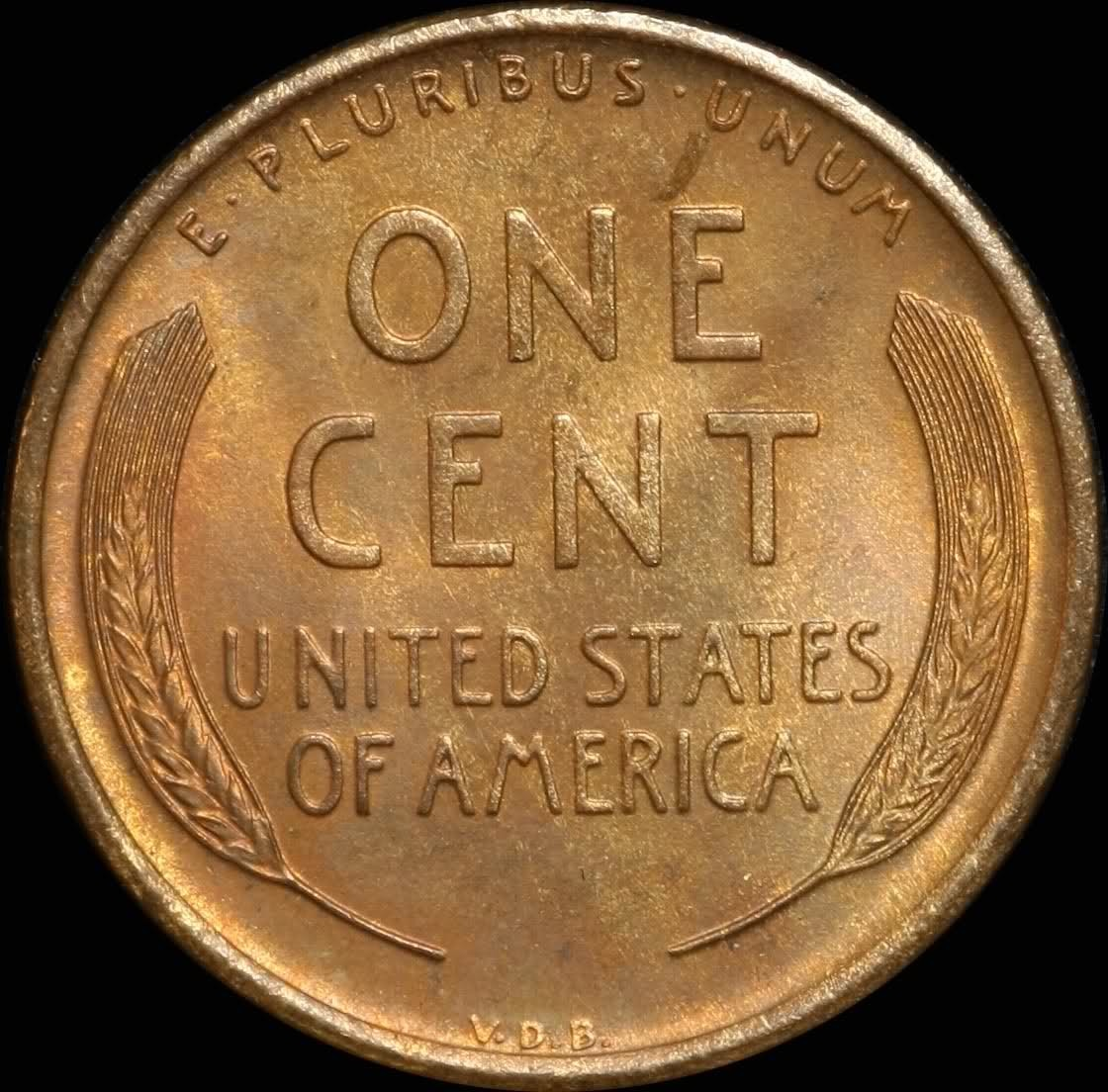
Reverse of a 1909-S VDB Lincoln Cent
