= Frick Fine Arts Building =

Historic building at the University of Pittsburgh

- Henry Clay Frick Fine Arts Building
- U.S. Historic district – Contributing property
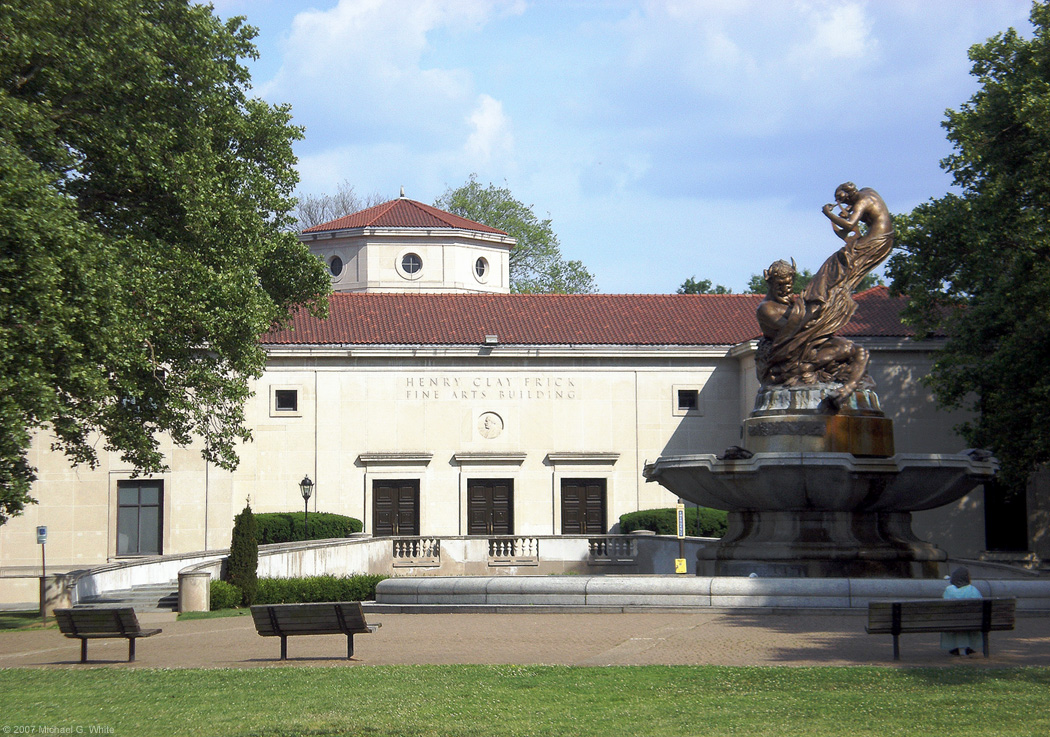
- The Frick Fine Arts Building at the University of Pittsburgh sits behind the Schenley Fountain
- Coordinates: 40°26′30.11″N 79°57′4.50″W
- Built: 1962–1965
- Architect: Burton Kenneth Johnstone
- Architectural style: Neo-Renaissance
- Part of: Schenley Farms Historic District (ID83002213)
- Added to NRHP: July 22, 1983

The Henry Clay Frick Fine Arts Building is a landmark Renaissance villa and a contributing property to the Schenley Farms-Oakland Civic Historic District on the campus of the University of Pittsburgh in Pittsburgh, Pennsylvania, United States. The Frick Fine Arts Building sits on the southern edge of Schenley Plaza, opposite The Carnegie Institute, and is the home of Pitt's History of Art and Architecture Department, Studio Arts Department, and the Frick Fine Arts Library. Before its front steps is Mary Schenley Memorial Fountain.

== History ==
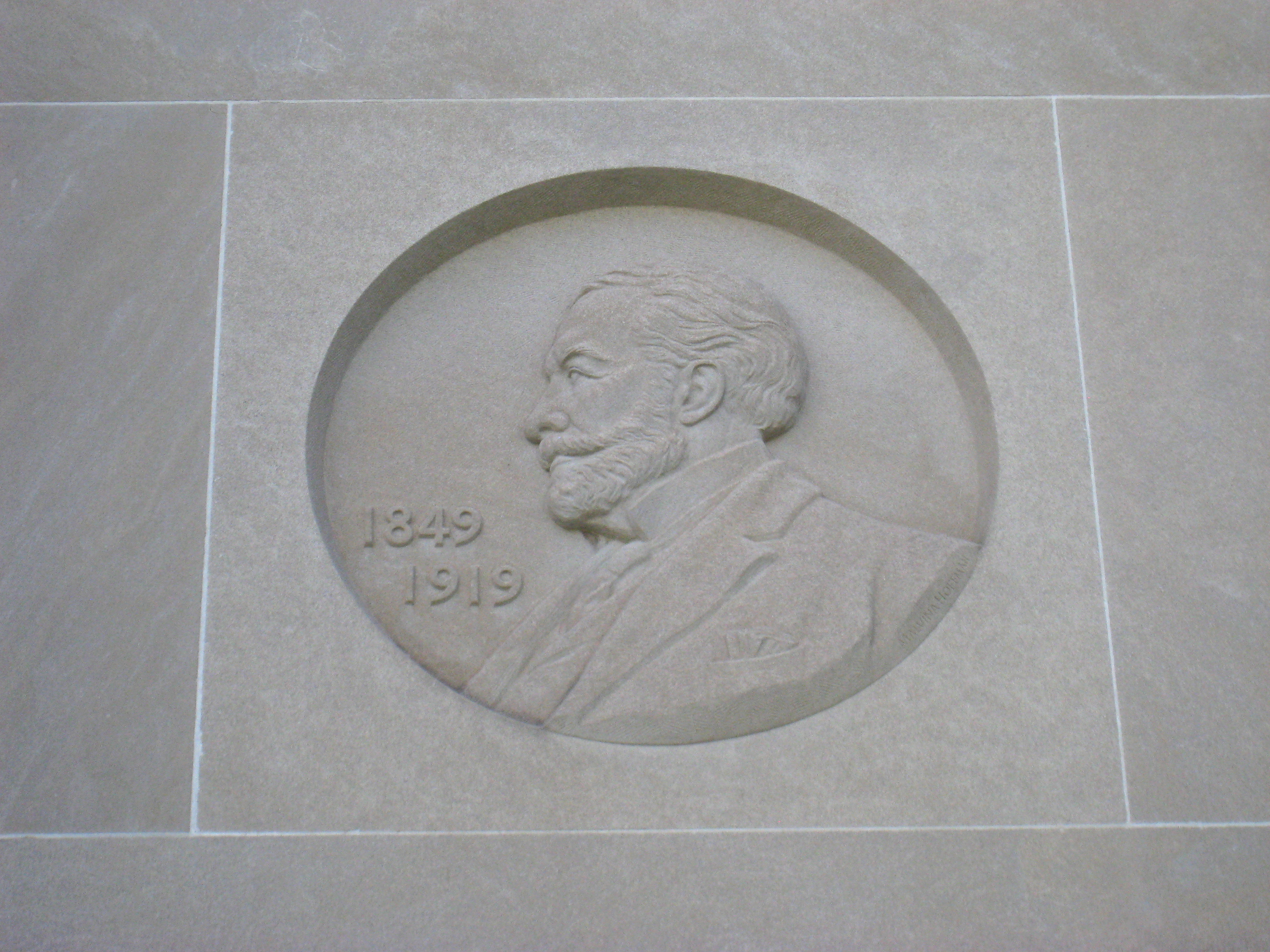
Henry Clay Frick portrait by Malvina Hoffman on the facade of the building

The Frick Fine Arts Building sits on the site of the former Schenley Park Casino, Pittsburgh's first multi-purpose arena with an indoor ice skating rink, sat on the location of the building before burning down in December 1896.

The building itself is a gift of Helen Clay Frick (1888–1984), daughter of the Pittsburgh industrialist and art patron Henry Clay Frick (1849–1919). She established the Fine Arts Department at the University of Pittsburgh in 1926 and continued to fund it through the 1950s, when she first made a commitment to create a separate structure to house it. Land for the project was donated to the university by the City of Pittsburgh.

In early negotiations with the University of Pittsburgh, Miss Frick asked that successors to the New York architects Carrère and Hastings design the new facility after the Italian palazzo its firm had built in Manhattan for her father some fifty years earlier. Eventually, however, both parties agreed to Burton Kenneth Johnstone Associates as the architects. Its design is modeled after Pope Julius III's (1487–1555) Villa Giulia in Rome, Italy. The building is constructed of white limestone and marble with a terracotta tile roof around a central courtyard. An octagonal cupola, which caps the central rotunda, rises 45 feet above the ground. The building houses the University of Pittsburgh's Department of History of Art and Architecture and Department of Studio Arts, and contains classrooms, an open cloister, an art gallery, a 200-seat auditorium, as well as a research library. Construction began in 1962 and the building was opened in May 1965.

By the late 1960s Miss Frick, unhappy that the university did not conform to her restrictions on management of both the department and the new building, severed her ties with the University of Pittsburgh. She responded by creating a new venture, The Frick Art Museum, on the property of her ancestral home, Clayton, a few miles east in Pittsburgh's Point Breeze neighborhood. That museum operates today as a part of the Frick Art & Historical Center complex.

== Building use and features ==
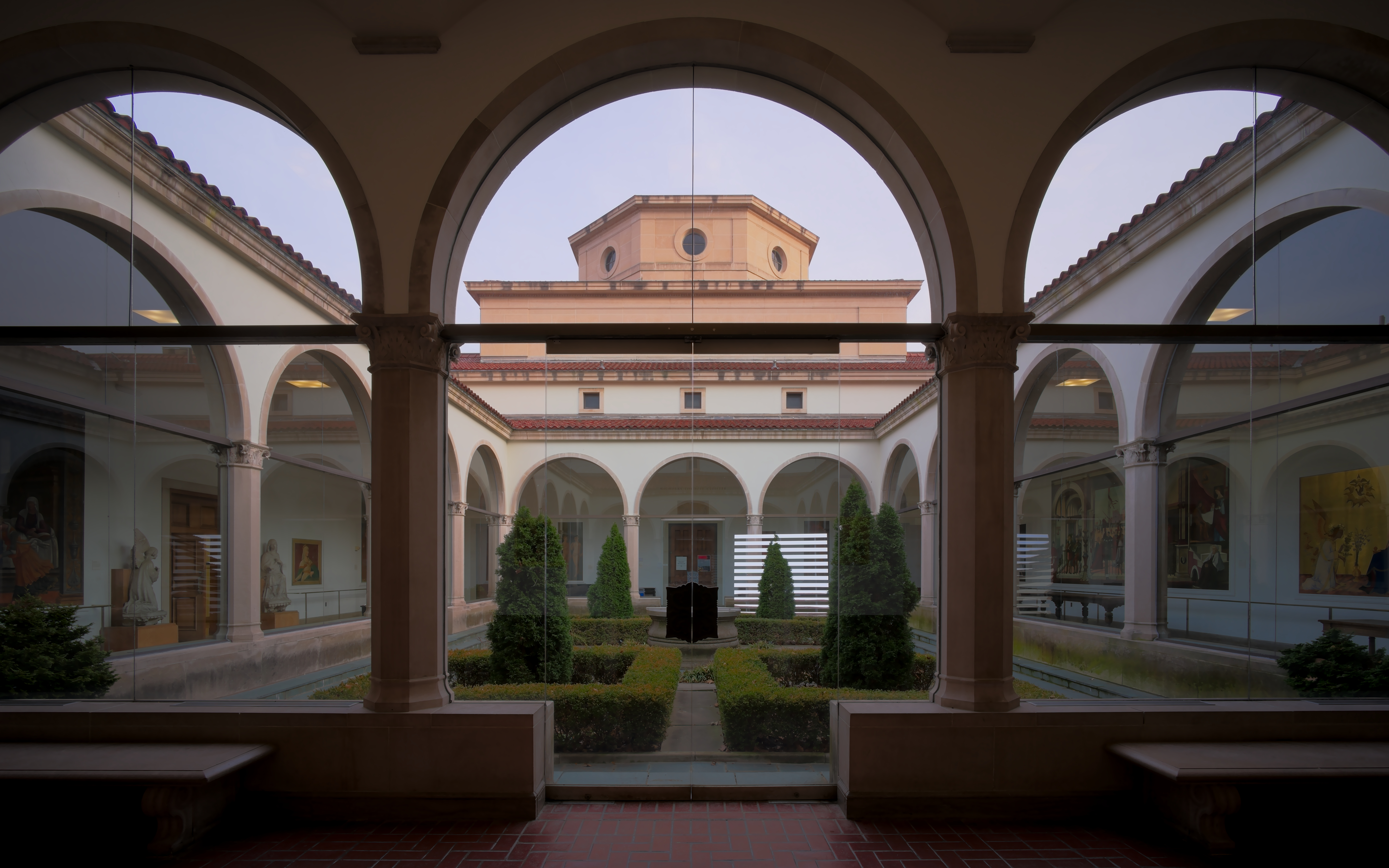
The Nicholas Lochoff Cloister of Frick Fine Arts Building

Today, the Frick Fine Arts Building consists of classrooms, art studios, a library, and art galleries around an open cloister and contains a 45 feet (14 m) high octagon capped by a pyramidal roof.

A noted 1965 low relief portrait of Henry Clay Frick by Malvina Hoffman in limestone sits above the entrance to the building. Hoffman was 79 years old when she accepted the commission. She could not sculpt it herself because union rules prevented sculptors from working on a relief attached to a building. However, she climbed up on the scaffolding to oversee the completion of the work. Inside the main entrance, a neon work by contemporary Chinese artist Gu Wenda is installed in the lobby.

The building also contains a 200-seat auditorium that is used for lectures, performances, and special events.

== Nicholas Lochoff Cloister ==
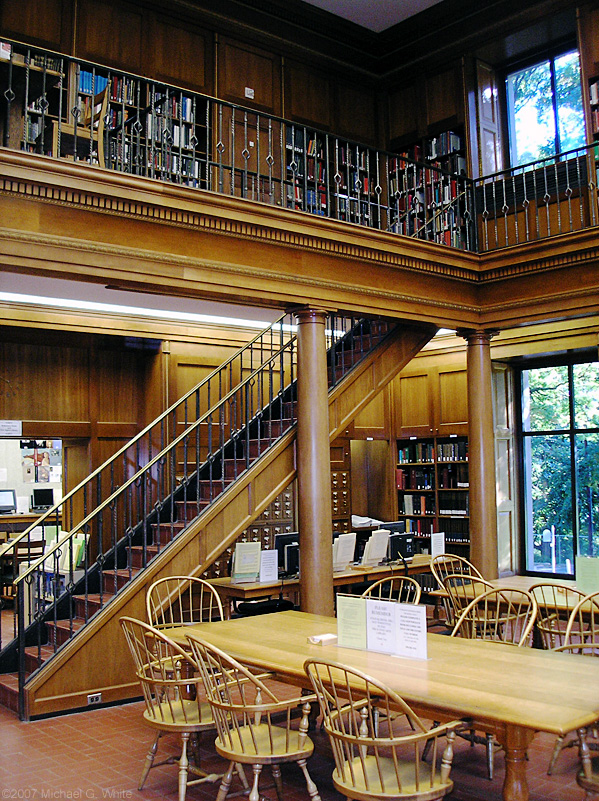
The Frick Fine Arts Library

The Nicholas Lochoff Cloister is a main feature of the Frick Fine Arts Building. Its large paintings of Italian masterpieces are scale reproductions that were commissioned in 1911 from Nicholas Lochoff by the Moscow Museum of Fine Arts (now the Pushkin Museum of Fine Arts). Lochoff worked slowly and carefully. Only a few paintings were completed and sent back to Russia by the Russian Revolution of 1917. Lochoff, unable to return because of new communist regime, felt compelled to sell off the paintings. Buyers included Harvard University and the Frick Art Reference Library in New York. Miss Frick acquired the entire collection, however, after Lochoff's death, with the help of art critic Bernard Berenson. In 2003, the paintings were cleaned and restored by Christine Daulton. Also in the gallery are noted Carrara marble reproductions of 14th century Annunciation figures by sculptor Alceo Dossena.

== Frick Fine Arts Library ==
Located in Frick Fine Arts Building, this two-story library houses a circulating research collection serving the Departments of the History of Art and Architecture and Studio Arts. The Collection contains over 90,000 volumes and subscribes to more than 350 journals in relevant fields and is ranked among the top 10 fine art libraries in the country. The library's reading room is constructed of fruit wood paneling and cabinetwork with gold leaf trim designed by Italian craftsmen. The library is further appointed by wrought iron balcony railings, terracotta tile flooring, maple tables with matching Windsor chairs, and ceiling-high windows furnishing views of Schenley Park. An inscription on the wall facing the entrance indicates the libraries dedication to Henry Clay Frick.

== University Arts Gallery ==
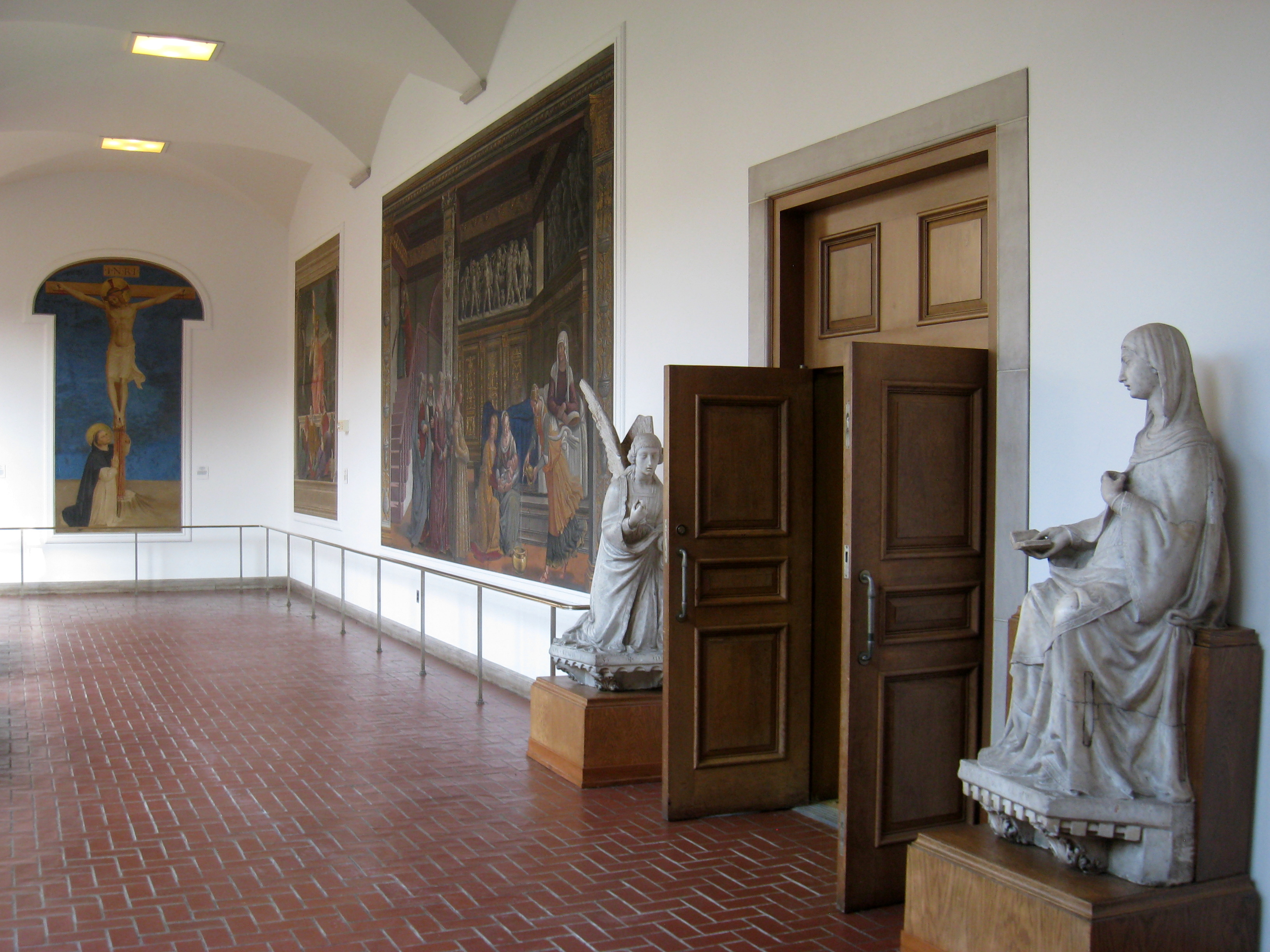
Entrance to the University Arts Gallery flanked by marble Dossena statues

The permanent collection contains a collection of prints and graphic works dating from the 16th through 20th centuries and regularly hosts changing exhibitions sponsored by the Department of the History of Art and Architecture and the Friends organization. Some of the more prominent pieces in the permanent collection include a large collection of Jacques Callot and Gertrude Quastler prints; 16th-18th century drawings from the Clapp and Denny families; a collection of 19th and 20th century photography; the Gimbel collection of American art; and various Japanese prints, Asian ceramics, portraits, and Pittsburgh-related paintings by Hetzel, Gorson, and Kane.

== Popular culture ==
The Frick Fine Arts Building appeared in scenes set at the University of Pittsburgh on an episode of As the World Turns that aired on November 12, 2002.

== Gallery ==
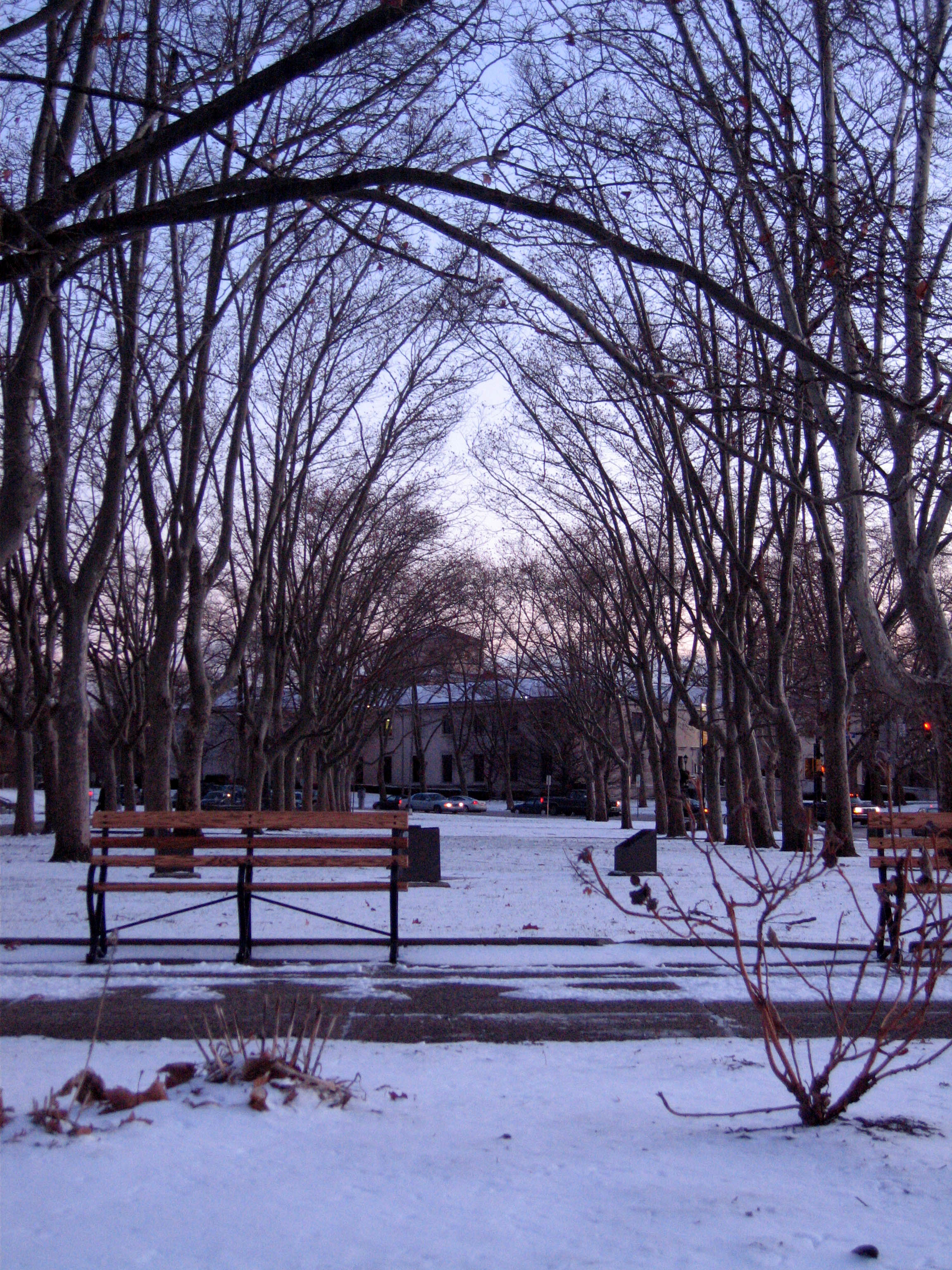
Frick Fine Arts in winter, looking south through trees of Schenley Plaza

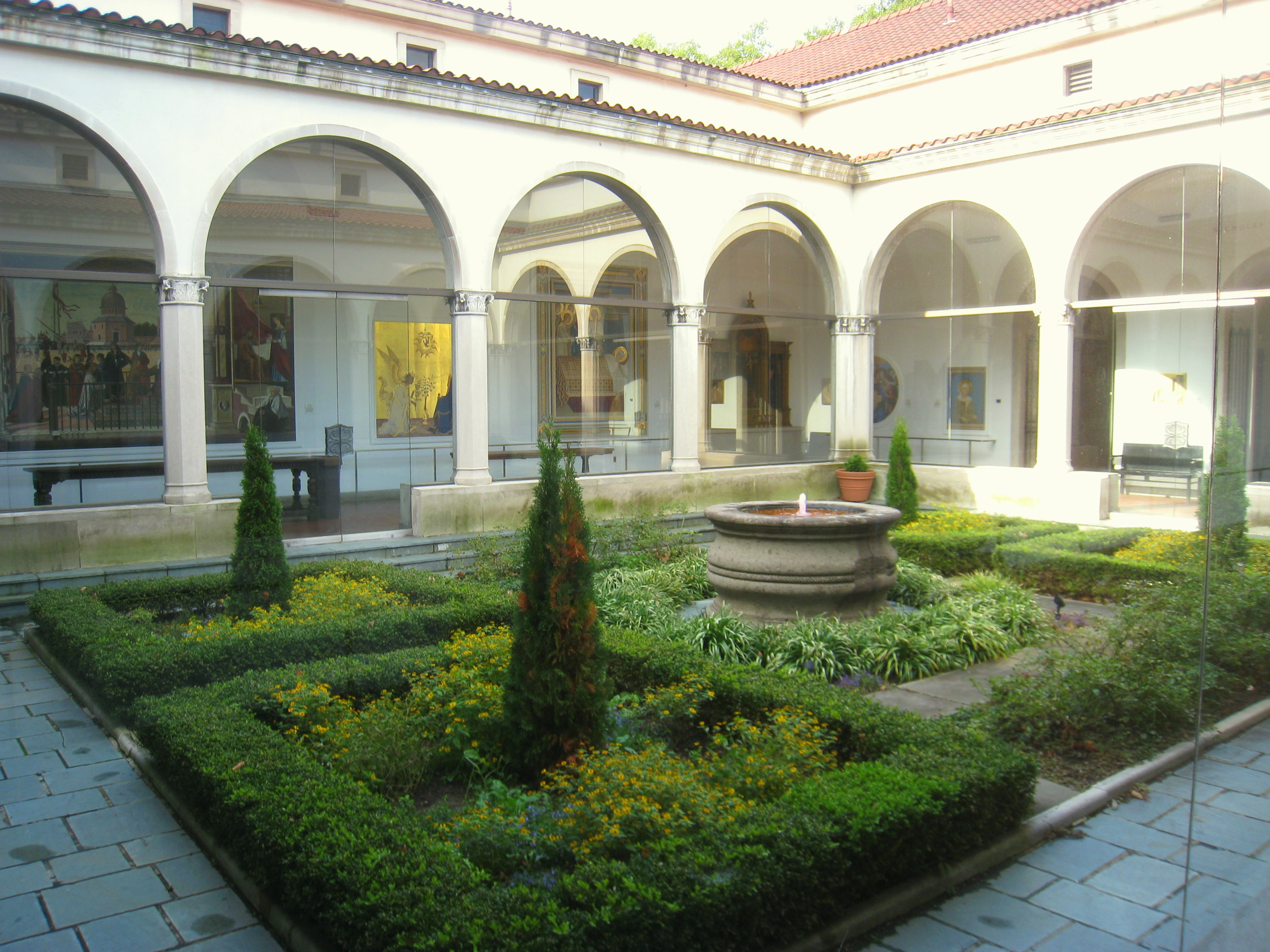
Chloister

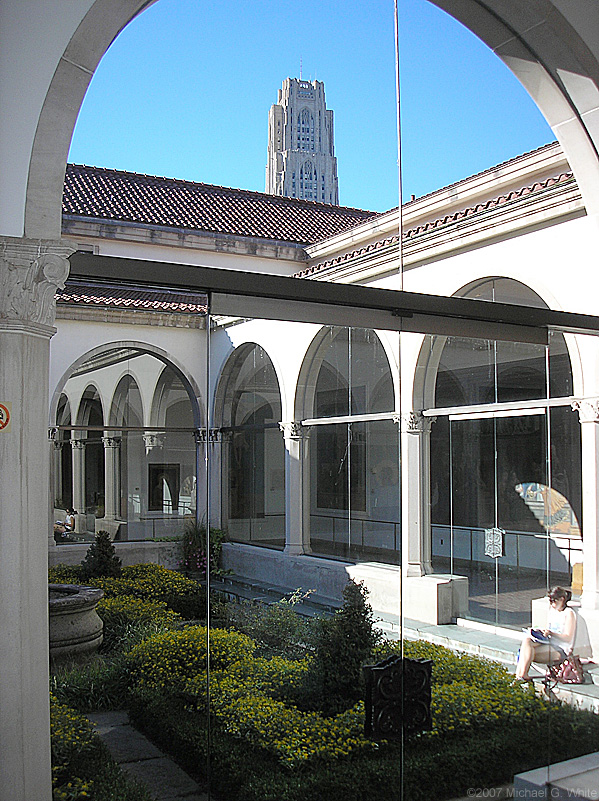
Chloister

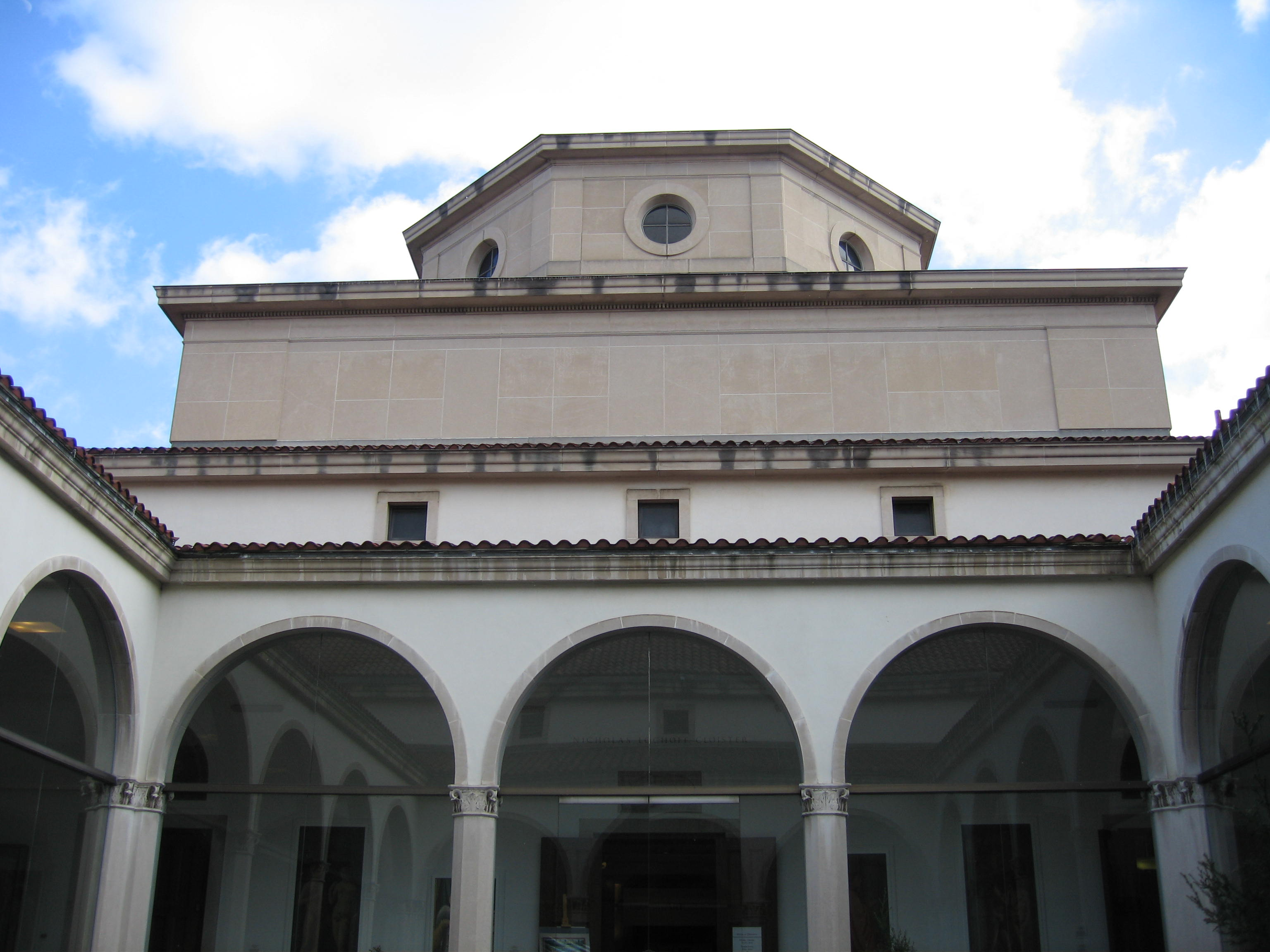
Octagonal cupola seen from chloister

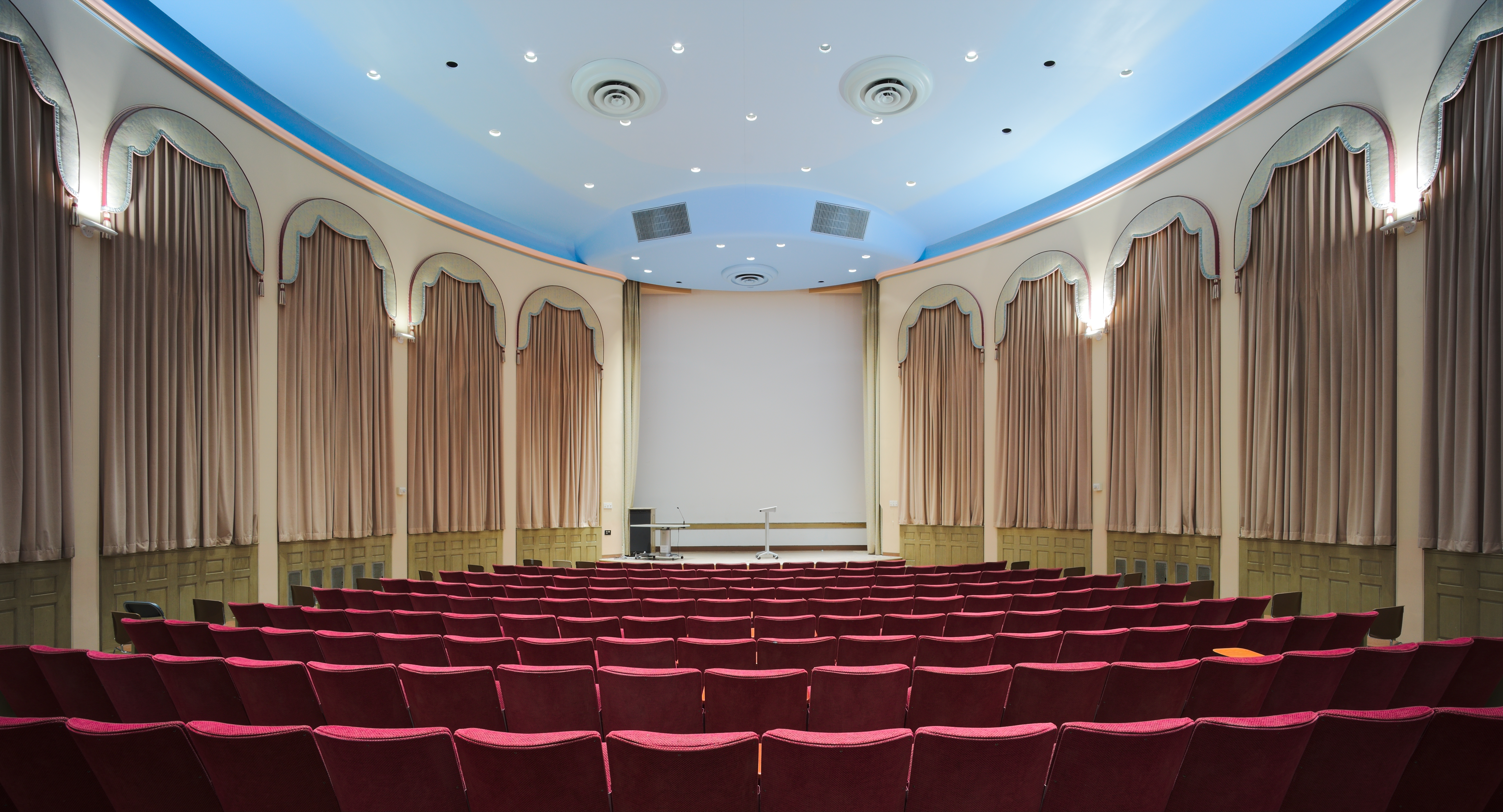
Frick Fine Arts Auditorium

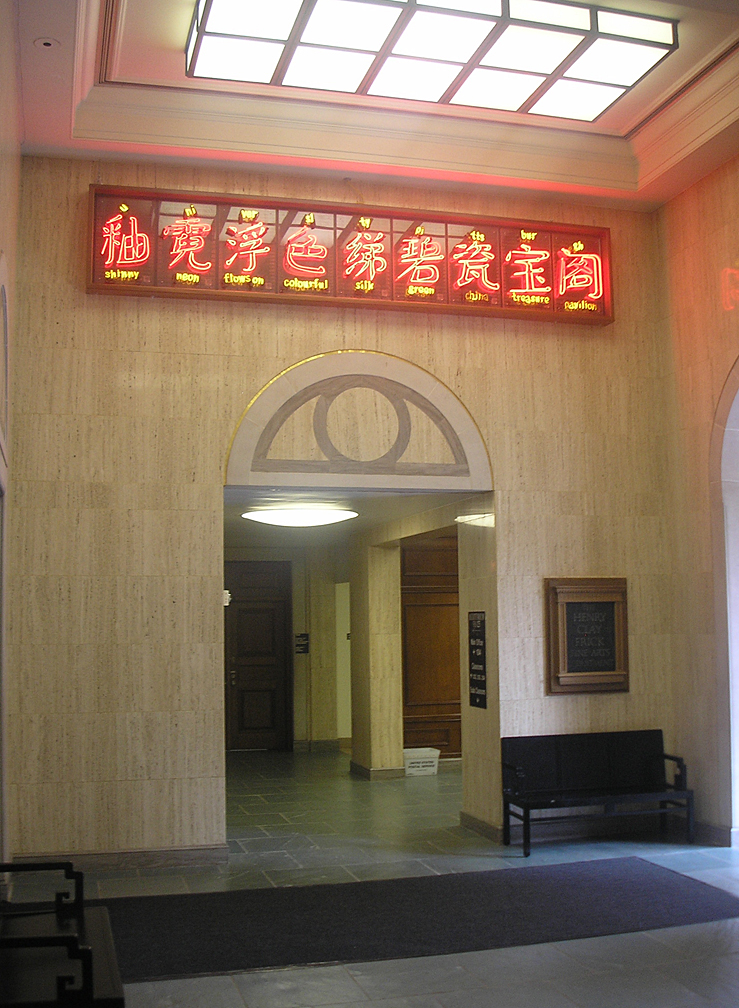
Frick Fine Arts main entrance lobby

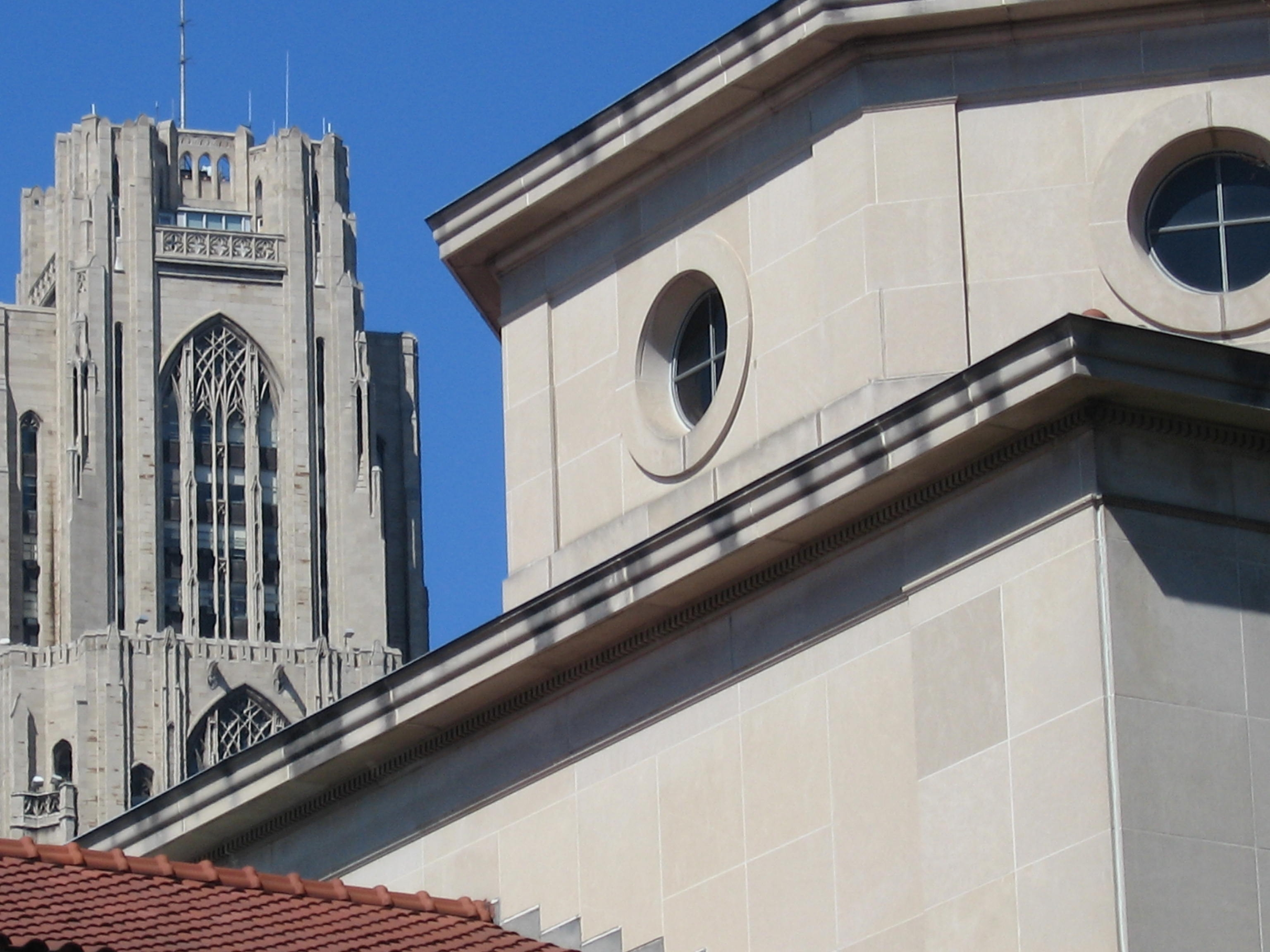
Octagonal cupola from south, Cathedral of Learning in background

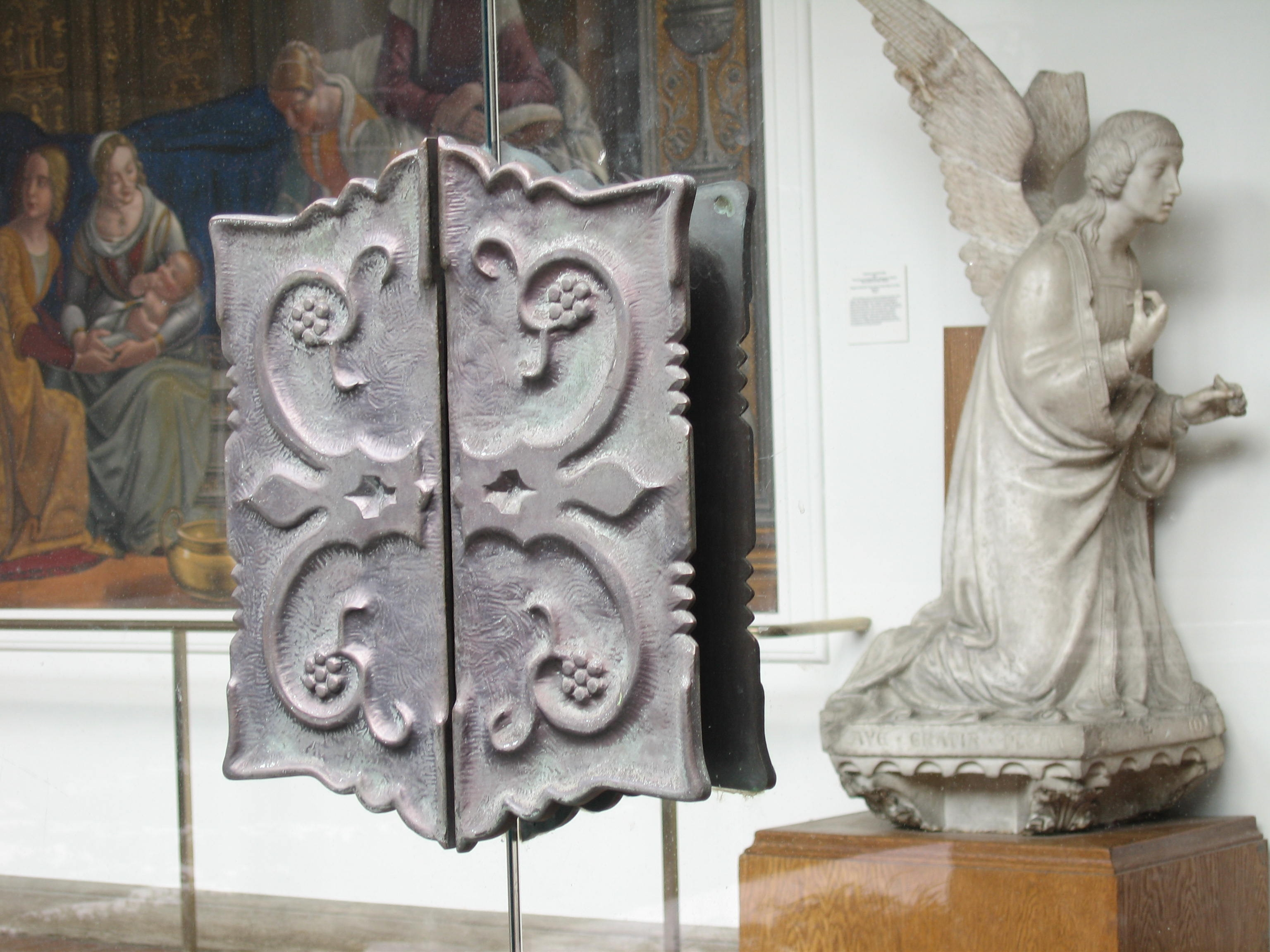
Nicholas Lochoff Gallery

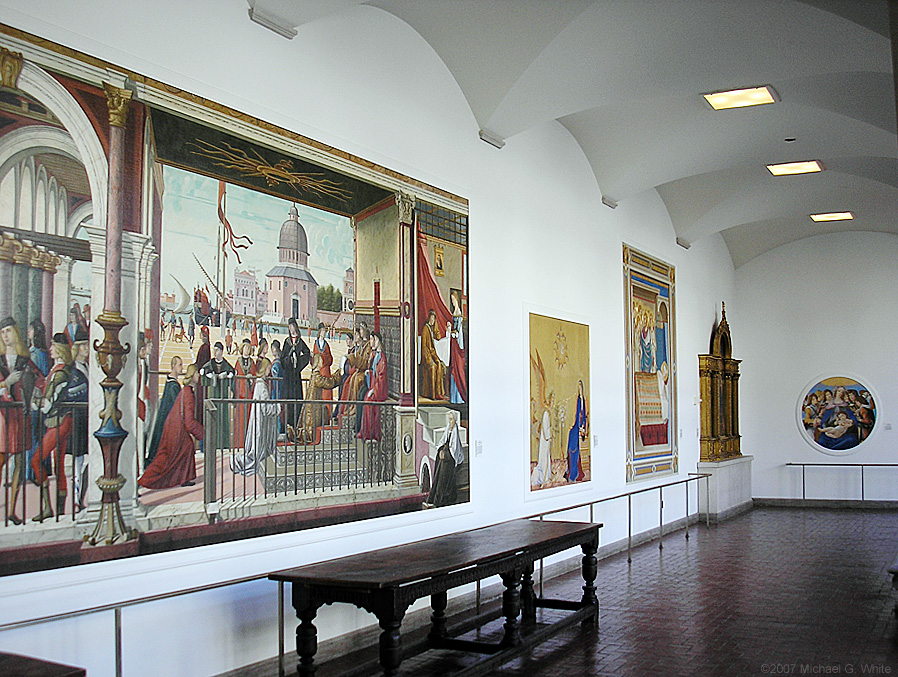
Nicholas Lochoff Gallery

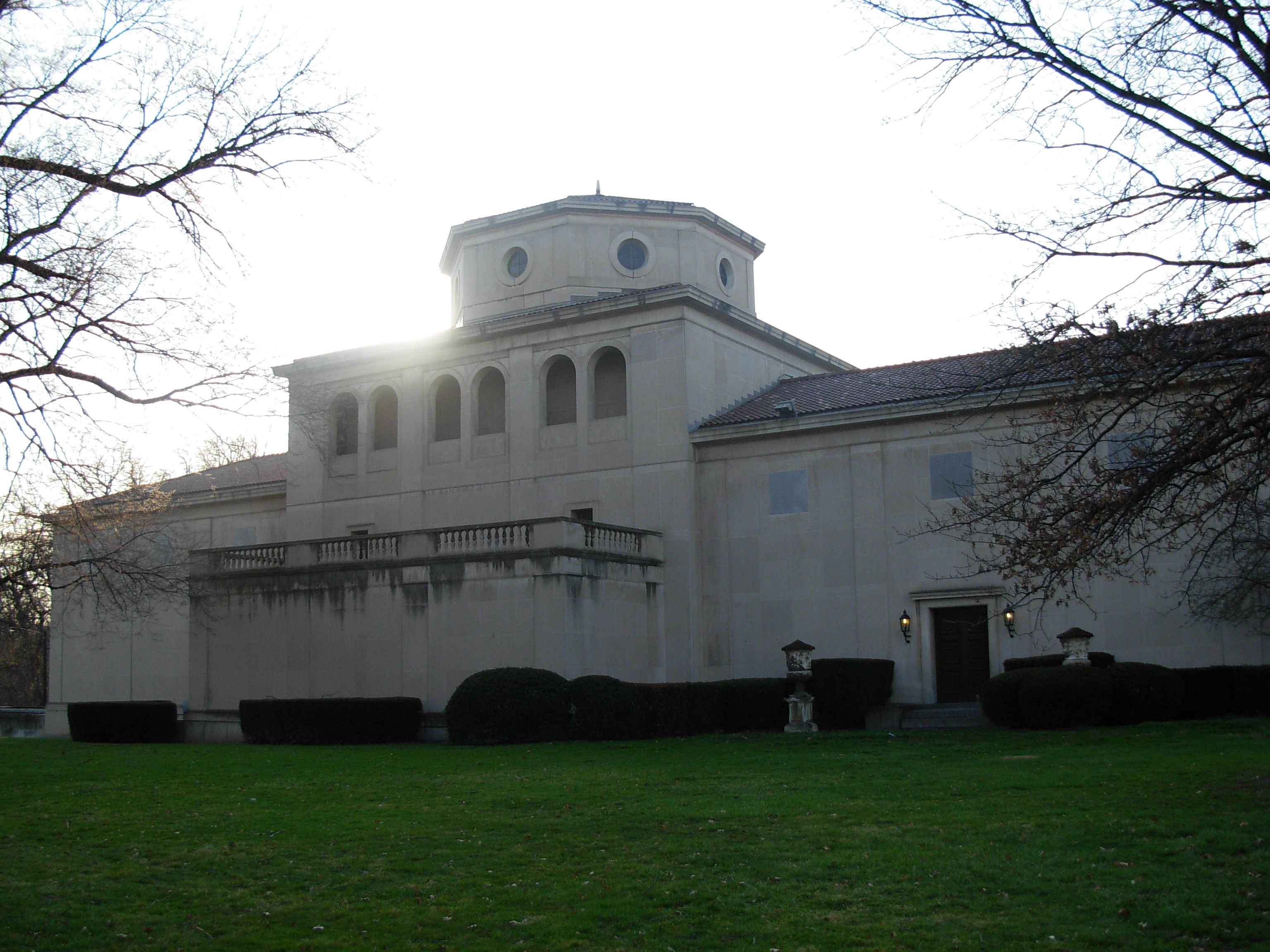
The back (east side) of the Frick Fine Arts Building

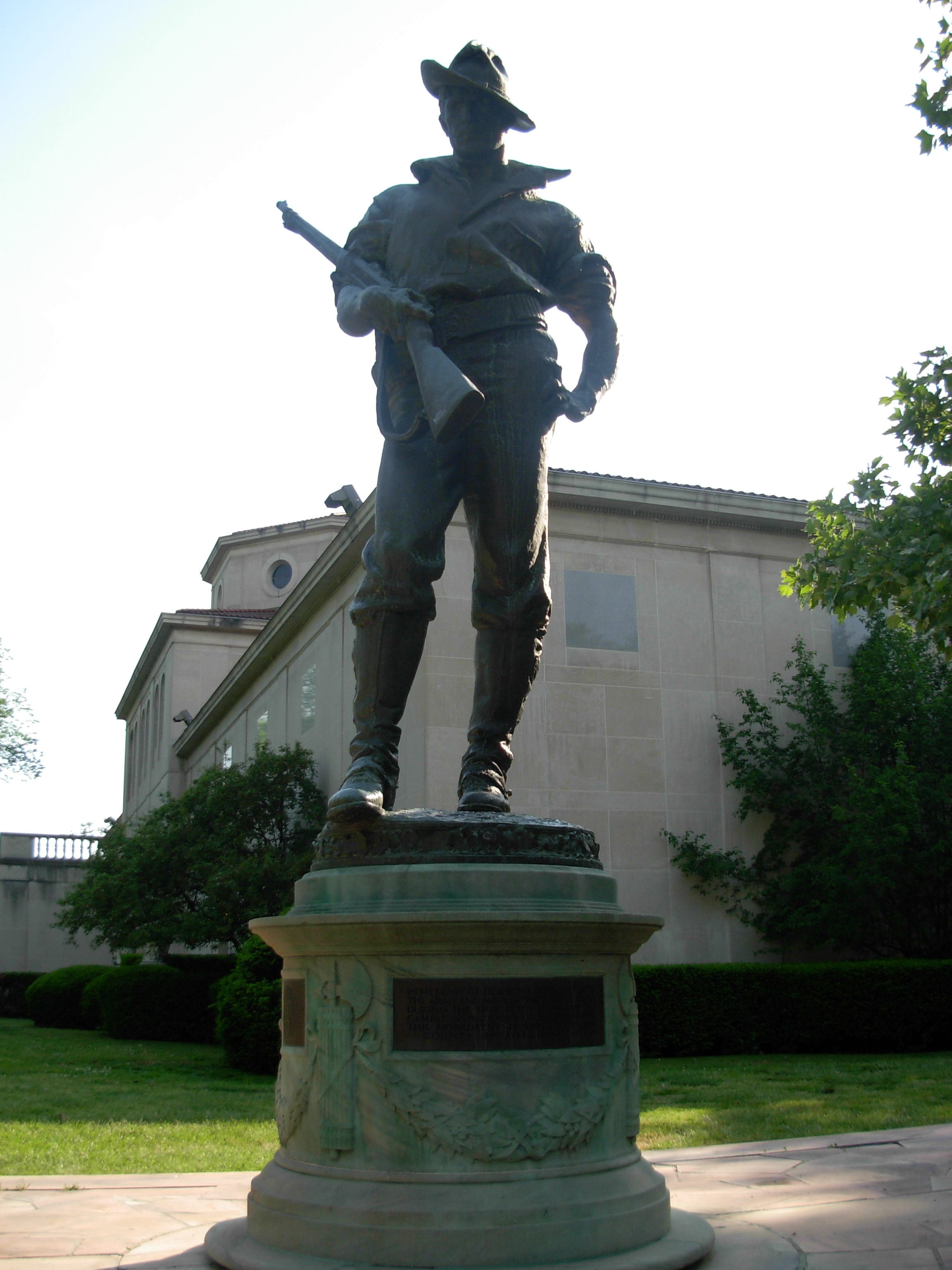
The Spanish–American War memorial is a copy of The Hiker (1925) by Allen Newman and stands on the north side of Frick Fine Arts

Preceded by Forbes Hall	University of Pittsburgh buildings Frick Fine Arts Building; Constructed: 1962–1965	Succeeded by School of Information Sciences Building
