= Gertrude Quastler =

Austrian-born American artist

- Born: 10 February 1909; Vienna
- Died: 8 July 1963 (aged 54); New York
- Known for: Painting, drawing, sculpture, printmaking
- Notable work: Counterpoint
- Spouse: Henry Quastler

Gertrude Quastler (February 10, 1909 – July 8, 1963) was an Austrian-born American artist, best known for her prints. Her art is noted for its wit and humor.

== Life ==
Born in Vienna, Gertrude trained as a milliner. She contracted tuberculosis, and was treated by doctor Henry Quastler, who married her in 1933. The couple moved to Albania shortly after marrying, where Henry was employed to train radiologists. When King Zog was overthrown, the Quastlers moved to America, where Henry soon became established as a major scientist. In America, Gertrude studied art, first at Columbia University and then at the University of Illinois. Henry also painted as an amateur. According to his sister Johanna, the couple sometimes exhibited together.

Quastler initially worked in painting, but later concentrated on printmaking, especially woodcuts, for which she became best known. She exhibited in New York and was represented by Weyhe Gallery. Her 1951 print Counterpoint was acquired by the Museum of Modern Art in New York. In 1952 she and her husband began a lifelong friendship with the artist Richard Diebenkorn, who also lived in Urbana, Illinois.

In 1958 Gertrude's health deteriorated dramatically. The couple moved to New York, where she continued to work in paint and drawing, but her print-making activity dropped off. She began making sculptures in 1959.

By the early 1960s Quastler's health required her to be hospitalized. She died at home in 1963. A few hours later, her husband took an overdose of pills, laid down beside her and held her hand until he died. Richard Diebenkorn later said, “Neither my wife nor I can think of a couple we encountered more indivisible.”

== Art ==
Quastler's art is known for its quirky humor, often with more sinister surreal elements mixed in. As Daniel Baumann write of a collection of personal drawings, "Little cartoons of snails have bared teeth, old men fall over drunk, scenes of brutal violence make appearances, nightmares and bad dreams seem to be documented, executions, suicides, and, to my mind most disturbing of all, scenes of cutting into the flesh attest to disorder that call out for analysis."

A large collection of her prints is held at the University of Pittsburgh's Frick Fine Arts Building.
