= Mary Schenley Memorial Fountain =

- Mary Schenley Memorial Fountain; A Song to Nature
- U.S. Historic district – Contributing property
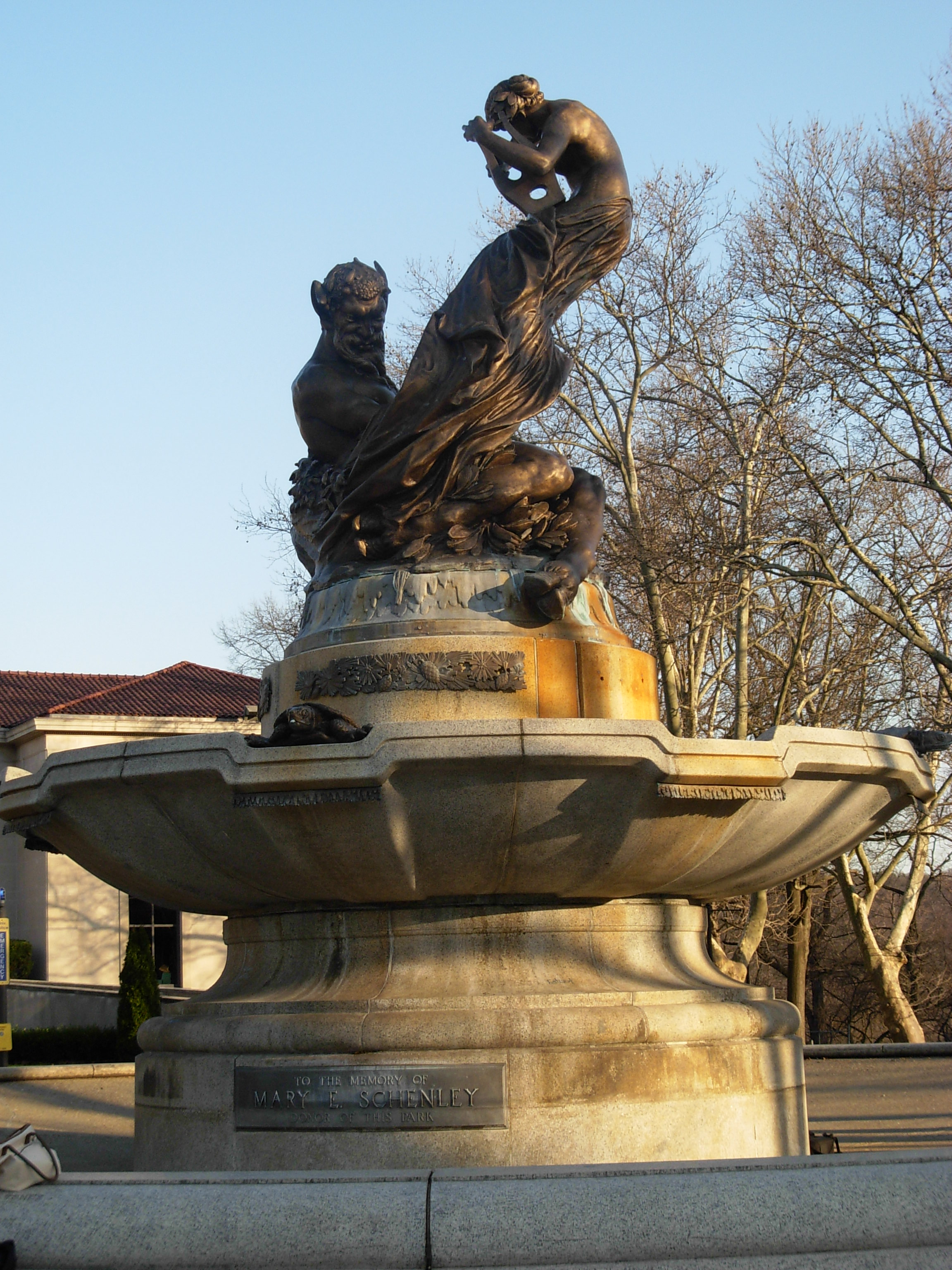
- The Mary Schenley Memorial Fountain in front of the Frick Fine Arts Building
- Location: Pittsburgh, Pennsylvania, USA
- Coordinates: 40°26′31.18″N 79°57′06.82″W
- Area: Schenley Farms Historic District
- Built: 1918
- Architect: Victor David Brenner
- Part of: Schenley Farms Historic District (ID83002213)
- Added to NRHP: July 22, 1983

The Mary Schenley Memorial Fountain, also known as A Song to Nature, is a 1918 landmark public sculpture in bronze and granite by Victor David Brenner. It sits in Schenley Plaza at the entrance to Schenley Park and directly in front of the University of Pittsburgh's Frick Fine Arts Building in Pittsburgh, Pennsylvania, United States. The fountain is designated as a contributing property to the Schenley Farms Historic District.

The work of art comprises two major figures: a reclining Pan, the Greek god of the wild, shepherds, and flocks, and above him a female singer playing a lyre. From crevices along the fountain's rim four turtles spew water into the basin. An inscription on the pedestal reads, "A Song of Nature, Pan the Earth God Answers to the Harmony and Magic Tones Sung to the Lyre by Sweet Humanity." The basin of the fountain is 15 feet high, above which the figures rise another 15 feet.

The fountain honors Mary Schenley, a major philanthropist to the city of Pittsburgh. In 1889, after intensive lobbying by Edward Manning Bigelow, director of parks for the City of Pittsburgh, Schenley donated the land for the park named in her honor. Upon her death in 1903, Pittsburgh City Council sponsored a national competition for the memorial. The judges selected the design by Brenner, who is famous for his design of the still-circulating Lincoln cent.

In June 2008, restoration efforts were begun that included repairs, cleaning, plumbing, paving, and landscaping. A gift from the Benter Foundation will provide lighting for the fountain and plaza.
