= Sidney Dancoff =

American theoretical physicist

- Born: September 27, 1913; Philadelphia
- Died: August 15, 1951 (aged 37); Urbana, Illinois
- Education: University of California at Berkeley
- Known for: Tamm–Dancoff approximation
- Spouse: Martha Friedman
- Children: 2
- Scientific career
- Thesis: Three problems in quantum mechanics (1939)
- Doctoral advisor: Robert Oppenheimer
- Doctoral students: Sidney Drell

Sidney Michael Dancoff (September 27, 1913 in Philadelphia – August 15, 1951 in Urbana, Illinois) was an American theoretical physicist best known for the Tamm–Dancoff approximation method and for nearly developing a renormalization method for solving quantum electrodynamics (QED).

== Early life ==
Dancoff was raised in the Squirrel Hill neighborhood of Pittsburgh. He attended Carnegie Tech on a private scholarship and received his B.S. in physics in 1934, followed by a master's degree from the University of Pittsburgh in 1936. He then went to the University of California at Berkeley where he earned his PhD in 1939 under Robert Oppenheimer.

== Career ==
While Dancoff was at Berkeley, Oppenheimer suggested that he work on the calculation of the scattering of a relativistic electron by an electric field. Such QED calculations typically gave infinite answers. Following earlier perturbation-theory work by Oppenheimer and Felix Bloch, he found that he could deal in various ways with the infinities that arose, sometimes by canceling a positive infinity with a negative one. However, some infinities remained uncanceled and the method (later called renormalization) did not give finite results. He published a general description of this work in 1939.

In 1948, Sin-Itiro Tomonaga and his students revisited this paper. Using improved calculational methods, they found that Dancoff had omitted one term or two terms. Once they repaired this omission, Dancoff's method worked, and they built on it to produce a theory of QED, for which Tomonaga shared the Nobel Prize in 1965. (At the same time, American physicists discovered Dancoff's error and solved QED, relying less directly on Dancoff.)

During the Second World War, Dancoff worked on the theory of the newly invented nuclear reactors. To take into account how fuel rods could "shadow" other rods by absorbing neutrons headed toward the other rods, he and M. Ginsburg developed the Dancoff factor, still used in reactor calculations.

After the war, Dancoff was on the faculty of the University of Illinois at Urbana-Champaign. In 1950 he published an approximation method for many-body theory that has been used in nuclear and solid-state physics. Igor Tamm had found it in 1945, and the method is now named after both.

In the late 1940s, Dancoff began a collaboration with the Viennese-refugee physician and radiologist Henry Quastler in the new field of cybernetics and information theory. Their work led to the publication of what is now commonly called Dancoff's Law. A non-mathematical statement of this law is, "the greatest growth occurs when the greatest number of mistakes are made consistent with survival".

== Death ==
Dancoff died of lymphoma in 1951 at the age of 37, after which his wife and two daughters moved to Los Angeles. In 1994, Dancoff's remains were reinterred at Mount Sinai Memorial Park Cemetery.
