= Schenley Plaza =

Park in Pittsburgh, Pennsylvania, United States

Coordinates: 40°26′34″N 79°57′09″W

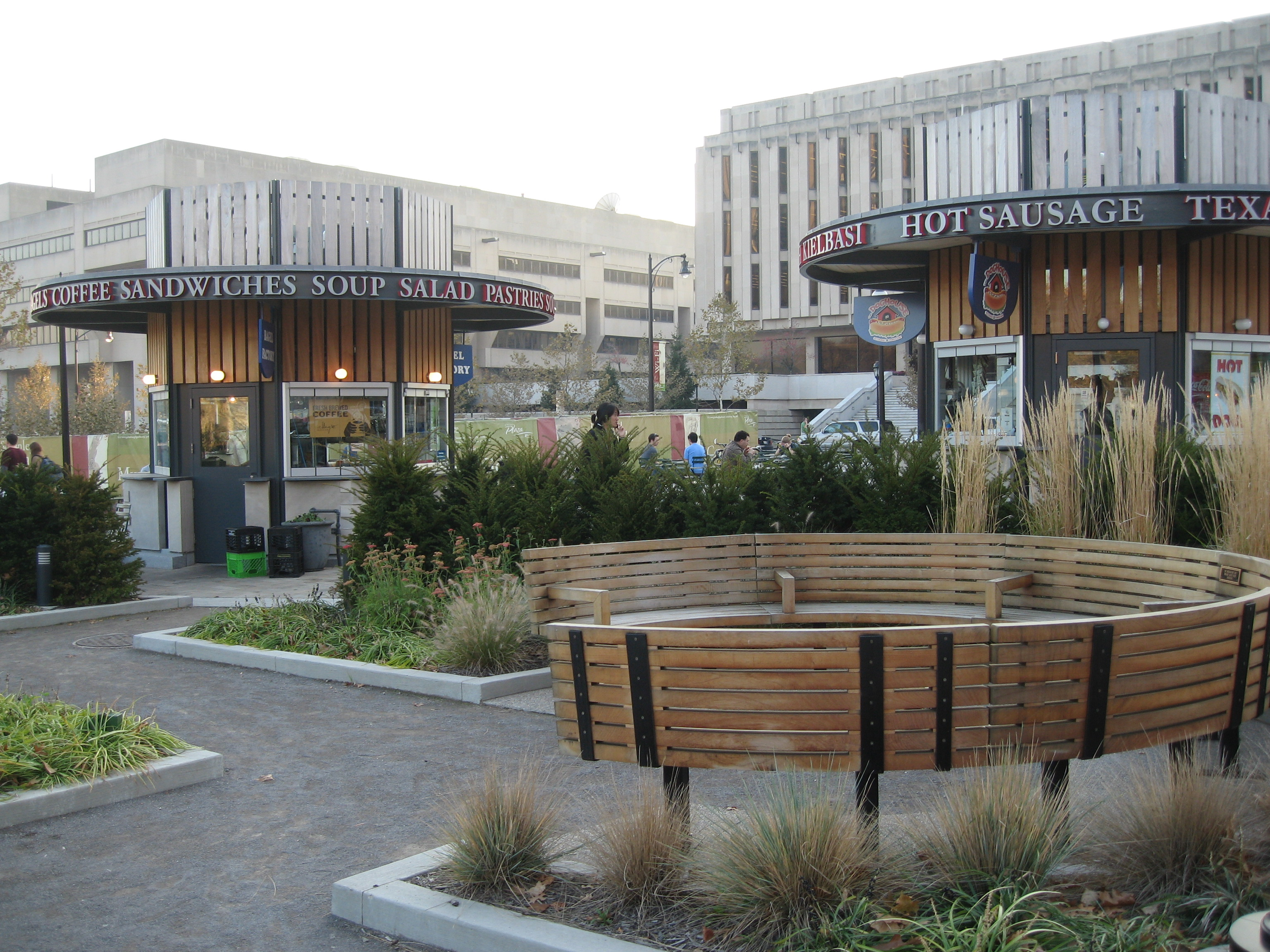
A view of the park benches and food kiosks at the Schenley Plaza

Schenley Plaza is a public park serving as the grand entrance into Schenley Park in Pittsburgh, Pennsylvania.

The 4.5-acre (18,000 m^{2}) plaza, located on Forbes Avenue and Schenley Drive in the city's Oakland district, includes multiple gardens, food kiosks, public meeting spaces, a carousel, and a prominent 1.0-acre (4,000 m^{2}) "Emerald Lawn" with free wireless internet access. The plaza is the site of the Mary Schenley Memorial Fountain, the Christopher Lyman Magee Memorial, the University of Pittsburgh's Frick Fine Arts Building, and formerly the Stephen Foster sculpture. The plaza is also surrounded by many prominent landmarks, including the University of Pittsburgh's Cathedral of Learning, Stephen Foster Memorial, Hillman Library, and Posvar Hall as well as the Carnegie Institute and its Dippy sculpture.

== History ==
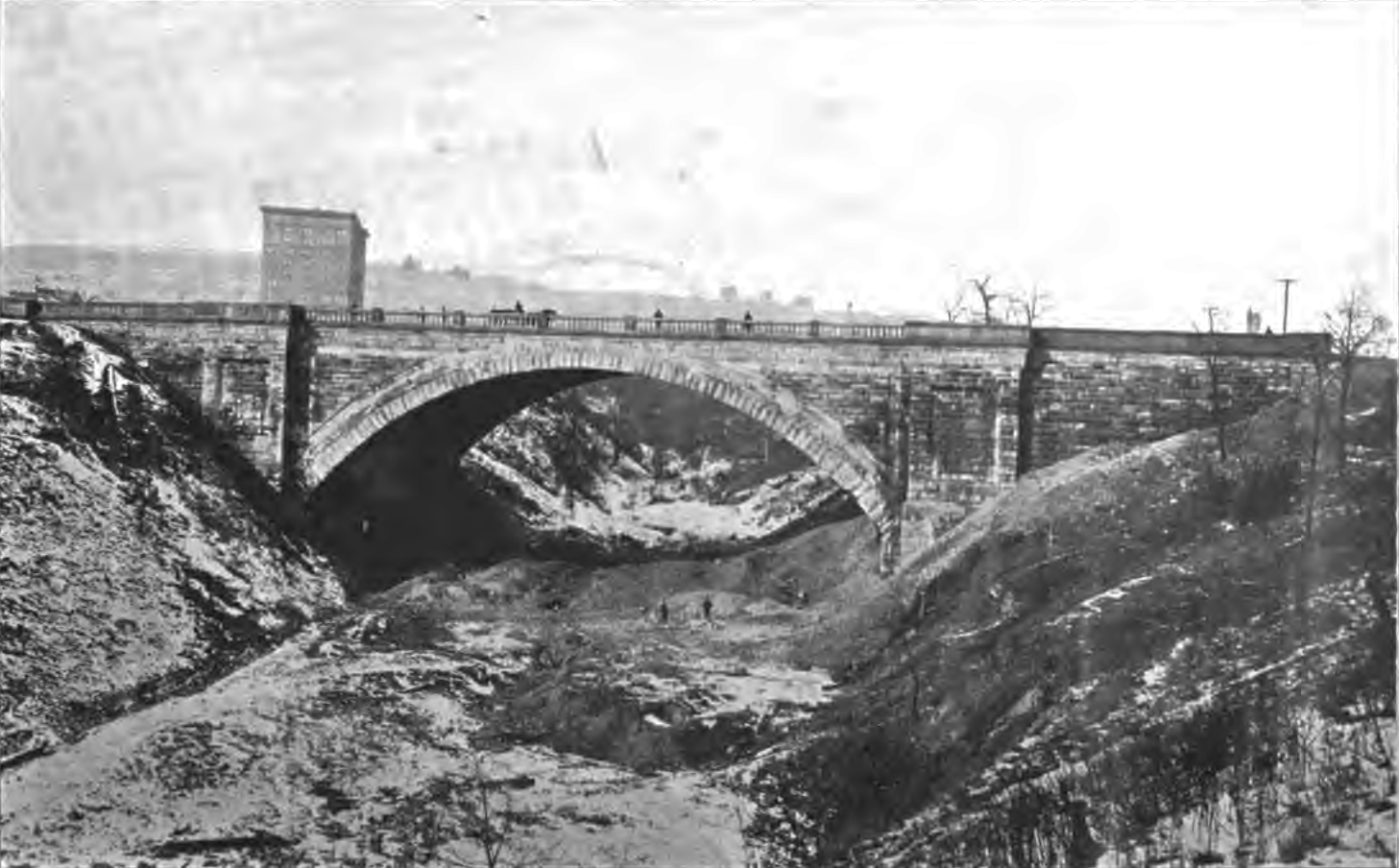
Bellefield Bridge

The site of Schenley Plaza was originally a deep gully which was called St. Pierre Hollow as it was near the end of St. Pierre Street (now Bigelow Boulevard). In 1898, a stone arch bridge called the Bellefield Bridge was built over the hollow, which together with the Schenley Bridge provided an entrance into Schenley Park from Forbes Avenue.

Eventually, sentiment arose that Bellefield Bridge was not a sufficiently impressive park entrance. Also, in 1911, a place was being sought for a monument to Mary Schenley, patroness of the park. The idea grew that a great public square, both for the memorial and the park entrance, was needed. A national competition elicited 45 proposals for the site, and in June 1915, judges selected the plan of Horace Wells Sellers and H. Bartol Register, both of Philadelphia. According to the judges, the winning design afforded "the simplest and least confusing plan of driveways; the circulation is good; and provision is made for automobile parking space." It was one of only two entries to provide parking as this was not mentioned in the brief for the competition.

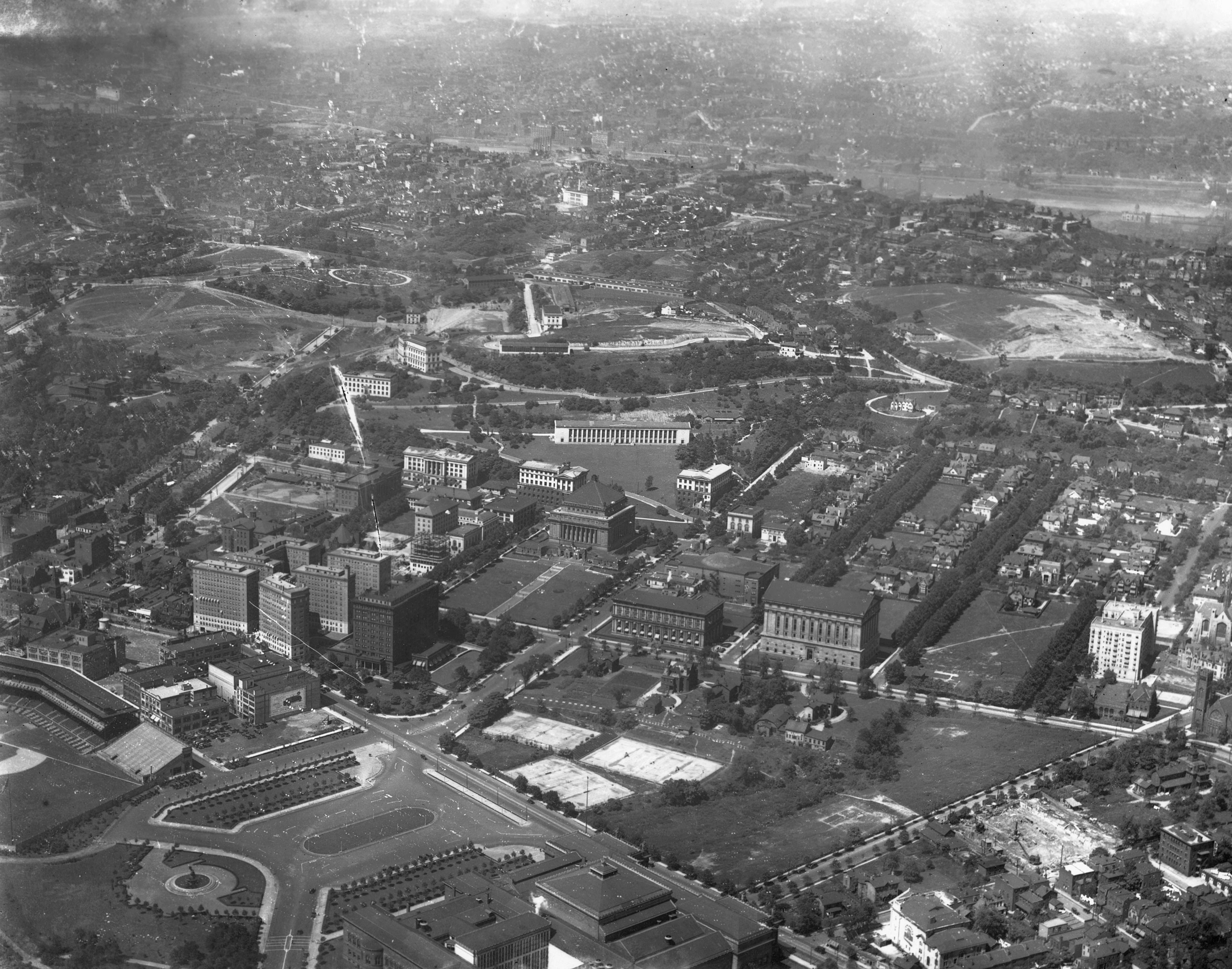
Schenley Plaza, at lower left, as it appeared c. 1923

Between 1913 and 1914 St. Pierre Hollow was filled in. The fill has been popularly said to be earth removed from Downtown's infamous "Hump" on Grant Street, but the supporting historical information for this story is disputed. The Bellefield Bridge remains buried here and supports some of the weight of the Mary Schenley Memorial Fountain, which was dedicated in 1918.

The plaza was built in 1921 with some modifications from Sellers and Register's winning design. It consisted of a wide driveway running from Forbes Avenue to the Schenley Bridge around a central oval, with grassy areas on either side planted with rows of London plane trees. The Schenley Fountain stood at the far end. Some planned elements, including a pair of ornamental gateposts, were not built.

By the 1930s, the plaza was starting to be used primarily as a parking area to accommodate demand from both university students and fans at Forbes Field, then home to the Pittsburgh Pirates and Pittsburgh Steelers, which stood on the west side of the plaza. In 1990, the city removed the central oval from the plaza to accommodate more cars, effectively turning it fully into a parking lot.

== Plaza renovation ==
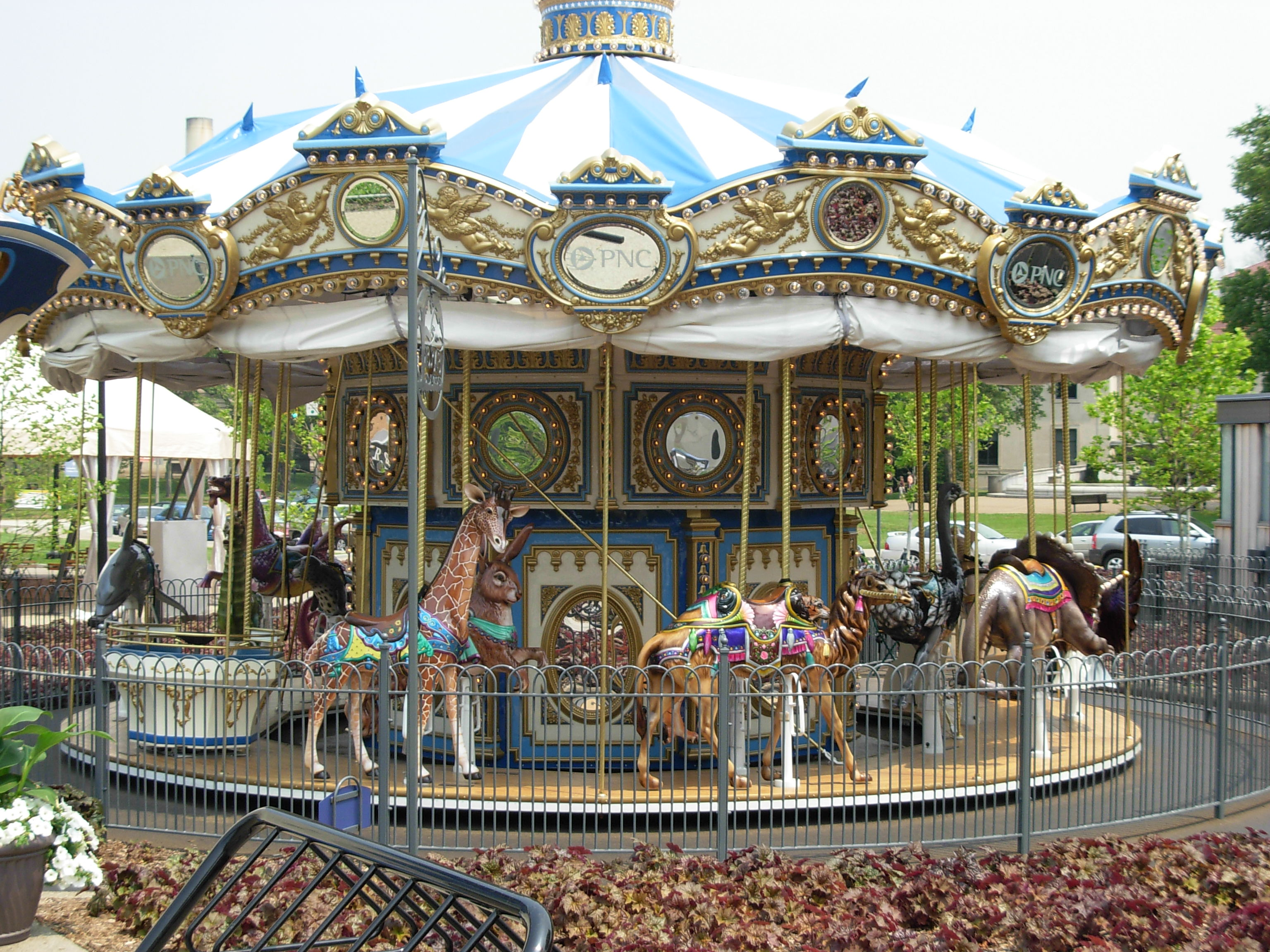
Schenley Plaza's carousel

From 2004–2006 the Pittsburgh Parks Conservancy, in partnership with the City of Pittsburgh oversaw a major renovation of the plaza, funded in part by the Oakland Investment Committee, restoring it as a grand entrance to the park. It now offers green space: a 1-acre (4,000 m^{2}) lawn, ever-changing ornamental gardens, and landscaping featuring plants native to Western Pennsylvania. Other features include benches, public programming, food kiosks, amenities such as free wireless service for computers, and a Victorian-style carousel as a featured family attraction. In 2009, the Schenley Plaza renovation won the Silver Award in the Environmentally Sustainable Project category at the 2009 International Awards for Livable Communities held in the Czech Republic city of Plzeň.

Schenley Plaza is operated by the non-profit Pittsburgh Parks Conservancy and is maintained in partnership with the City of Pittsburgh's Department of Parks & Recreation (CitiParks) and Department of Public Works. It is open dawn to dusk.

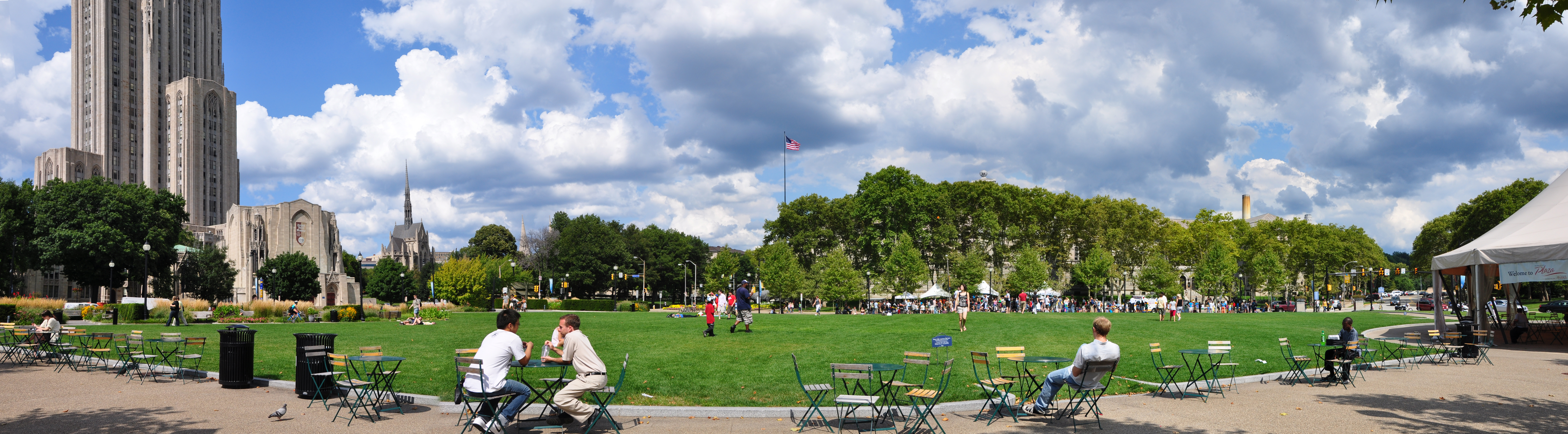
View from the southwest corner of Schenley Plaza. The University of Pittsburgh's Cathedral of Learning, Stephen Foster Memorial, and Heinz Chapel can be seen on the left. Across the plaza, behind the trees, is the Carnegie Institute and Library complex.

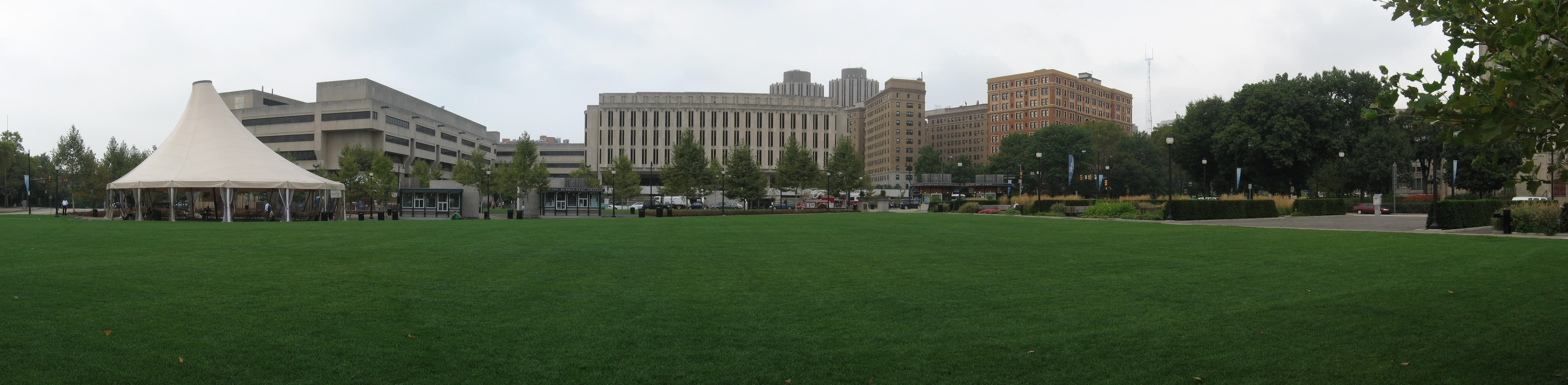
Alternate view of Schenley Plaza, showing Posvar Hall, Hillman Library, Schenley Quadrangle, and the William Pitt Union.
