= George S. Richardson (engineer) =

American civil engineer

- Born: 1895 or 1896; Georgetown, Colorado
- Died: August 26, 1988 (aged 92); Colorado Springs, Colorado
- Other name: "Dean of Pittsburgh bridge engineers"
- Occupation: civil engineer
- Years active: 1920–73
- Known for: multiple bridges in Pittsburgh area
- Notable work: Point Bridge II, 1925

George Sherwood Richardson (1896–1988) was an American engineer known for his elegant bridges, innovative construction techniques and skillful planning of highways. Designer of many bridges in the Pittsburgh and Allegheny County areas in the 20th century, he has been called "the dean of Pittsburgh bridge engineers".

== Early life and education ==
Born in Georgetown, Colorado, he served in World War I prior to graduating from the University of Colorado in 1920.

== Engineering career ==
After a stint with the Wyoming Department of Highways and time on the faculty of the University of Pennsylvania, Richardson moved to Pittsburgh in 1922 to work for the American Bridge Company before he joined the Allegheny County Department of Public Works in 1924, where he went on to rise to be assistant chief engineer by the time he left in 1937.

=== Richardson, Gordon & Associates ===
In 1939 he founded his own firm, as George S. Richardson, Consulting Engineer; after taking on partners, the firm was renamed to Richardson, Gordon & Associates in 1955. It has been involved in the planning and design of many major highway projects across the United States. In the 1980s, the company was acquired by international architectural and engineering conglomerate HDR, Inc.

Among other notable work, the firm created the erection process and custom equipment used to put up the Eero Saarinen-designed Saint Louis Gateway Arch.

Richardson retired in 1973 and moved from Pittsburgh in 1975, splitting time between homes in Tucson, Arizona and Colorado Springs, Colorado. He died of a heart attack at the age of 92 at his home in Colorado and was buried in Waterford, Pennsylvania.

== Notable projects ==
- Pittsburgh Point Bridge II, 1925
- Liberty Bridge, 1928
- McKees Rocks Bridge, 1931
- George Westinghouse Bridge, 1932
- West End Bridge, 1932
- Tenth Street / Philip Murray Bridge, 1933
- Homestead Grays Bridge, 1936
- Jerome Street Bridge, 1937
- Delaware River–Turnpike Toll Bridge, 1955
- Fort Pitt Bridge, 1959
- Fort Duquesne Bridge, 1963
- Fern Hollow Bridge, 1973

== Industry service ==
- American Society of Civil Engineers - National Director
- American Institute of Consulting Engineers - President
- American Road Builders' Association, Engineering Division - President

== Awards ==
- National Society of Professional Engineers. Pittsburgh, Pennsylvania Chapter - Distinguished Service Award
- American Society of Military Engineers - Distinguished Service Award

In 1987, the Engineer's Society of Western Pennsylvania established the George S. Richardson medal, which has since been awarded annually for an outstanding achievement in bridge engineering.
