= Armstrong Tunnel =

- U.S. National Register of Historic Places
- Pittsburgh Landmark – PHLF
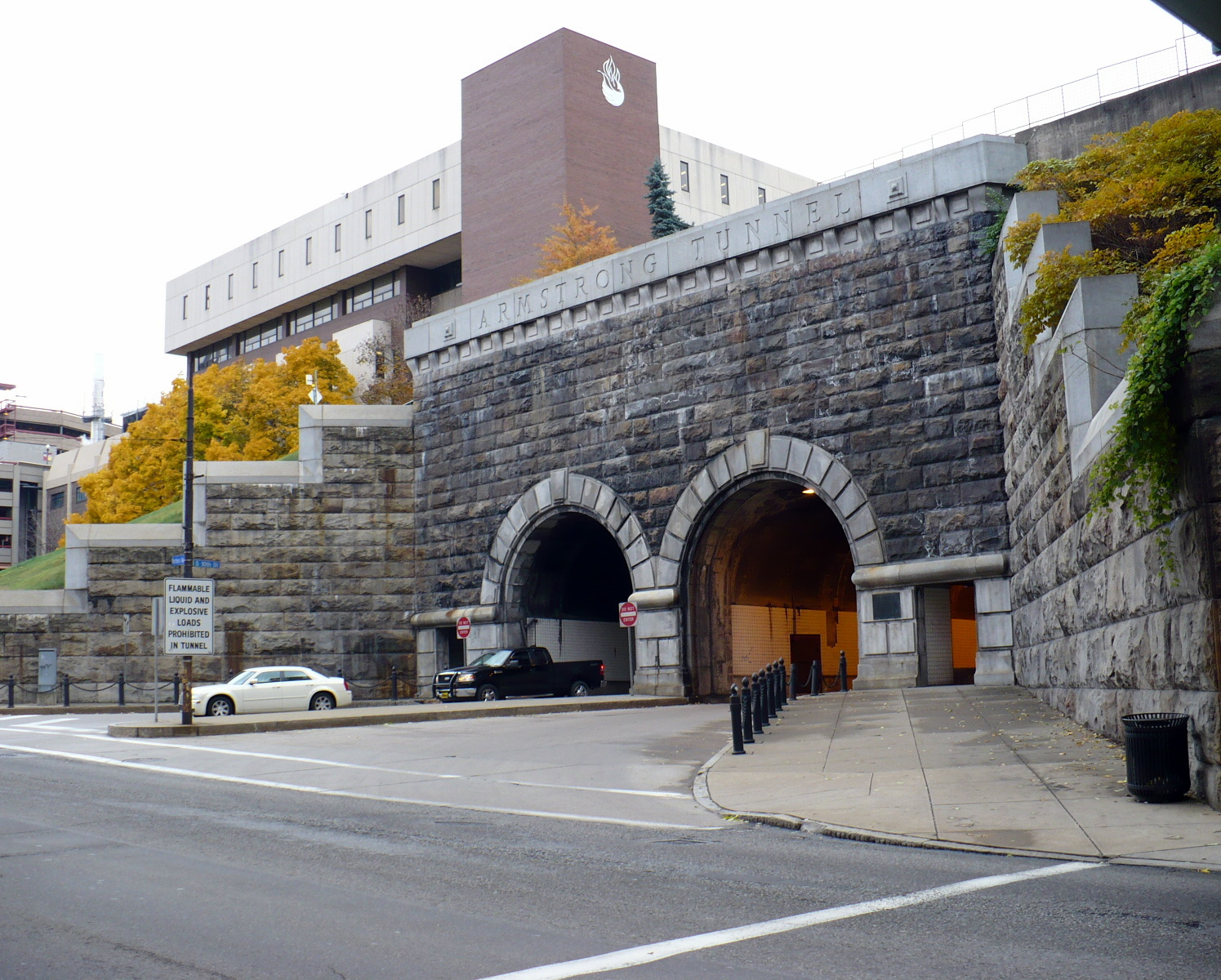
- The Armstrong Tunnel at Forbes Avenue. Duquesne University's Gumberg Library is visible in the background

- Location within Pittsburgh Location within Pennsylvania Location within the United States
- Location: Between Forbes and Second Aves. at S. Tenth St., Pittsburgh, Pennsylvania.
- Coordinates: 40°26′10″N 79°59′28″W
- Built: 1926
- Architect: Covell, Vernon R.; Et al.
- NRHP reference No.: 86000015

Significant dates
- Added to NRHP: January 7, 1986
- Designated PHLF: 2003

The Armstrong Tunnel in Pittsburgh, Pennsylvania, connects Second Avenue at the South Tenth Street Bridge, under the Bluff where Duquesne University is located, to Forbes Avenue between Boyd Street and Chatham Square.

== Construction ==
The tunnel was constructed between 1926 and 1927. The chief engineer was Vernon R. Covell of the Allegheny County Public Works Department. The tunnel portals were designed by a city architect, Stanley L. Roush, who is also noted for the Smithfield Street Bridge portals, the Pittsburgh City-County Building, the Corliss Tunnel, and many other municipal projects.

== Characteristics ==
The tunnel itself is characterized by twin bores of horseshoe cross-section, and bends halfway through. It also has a pedestrian walkway on the western side.

A legend mentioned by the site involves a notion that the bend in the tunnel was a mistake, and whoever was responsible committed suicide in shame. Chief engineer Covell did not kill himself, invalidating this legend. Author Bruce S. Cridlebaugh suspects the bend was related to mines or other geological factors, property rights (including Duquesne University), or alignments with existing or proposed roads.

Since August 1987 the tunnels have provided cellular phone reception.

== Name ==
The tunnels were named in honor of Joseph G. Armstrong, County Director of Public Works. Most of the bridges over the Pittsburgh's three rivers were replaced between 1910 and 1940, years which included Mr. Armstrong's terms as Mayor of Pittsburgh and Allegheny County Commissioner.
