= Jerome Street Bridge =

Bridge in McKeesport, Pennsylvania, U.S.

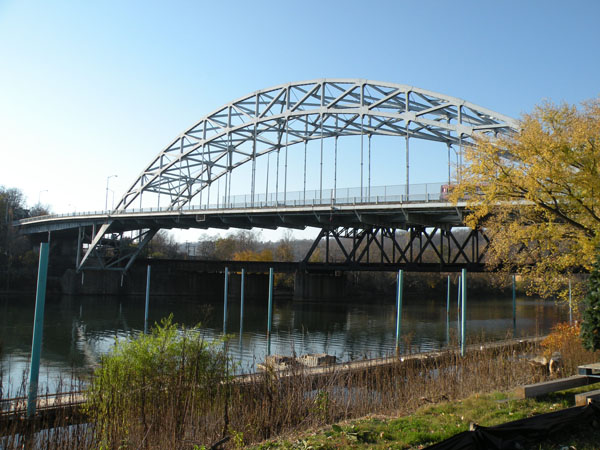
- Coordinates: 40°21′01″N 79°52′13″W
- Carries: George Lysle Boulevard
- Crosses: Youghiogheny River
- Locale: McKeesport, Pennsylvania
- Other name: Lysle Boulevard Bridge

Characteristics
- Design: Arch bridge
- Total length: 762 ft (232 m)
- Clearance below: 39 ft (12 m)

History
- Engineering design by: George S. Richardson
- Opened: May 4, 1938
- Jerome Street Bridge
- U.S. National Register of Historic Places
- Pittsburgh Landmark – PHLF
- Location within Pennsylvania Location within the United States
- Coordinates: 40.350326°N 79.870354°W
- Built by: Morehouse, T.T.; Fort Pitt Bridge Works
- Engineer: George S. Richardson
- MPS: Highway Bridges Owned by the Commonwealth of Pennsylvania, Department of Transportation TR
- NRHP reference No.: 88000818

Significant dates
- Added to NRHP: June 22, 1988
- Designated PHLF: 2004

Location
- Interactive map of Jerome Street Bridge

The Jerome Street Bridge is an arch bridge across the Youghiogheny River connecting the east and west banks of the Pittsburgh industrial suburb of McKeesport, Pennsylvania. The bridge is a rare steel crescent arch bridge. A crescent arch is formed when the intrados and extrados (the ribs) of the arch are not parallel, but instead form two different curves beginning and ending together. The ribs form a truss at the top of the arch and join together in a solid rib at each end. A crescent arch is a two-hinged arch, the ribs are further apart where the bending moment is greatest and close together at each hinge where it is minimized.

== History and architectural features ==
This bridge was engineered by George S. Richardson. (Note: Condit credits the bridge engineering to Vernon Covell.) A Great Depression-era public works bond was provided to fund the creation of a new auto-centric four-lane highway bridge.

The bridge was dedicated on May 3, 1938 and opened to traffic on May 4. Thousands of people attended the ceremony and parade to celebrate the new bridge. The total cost of the new bridge was $667,000.

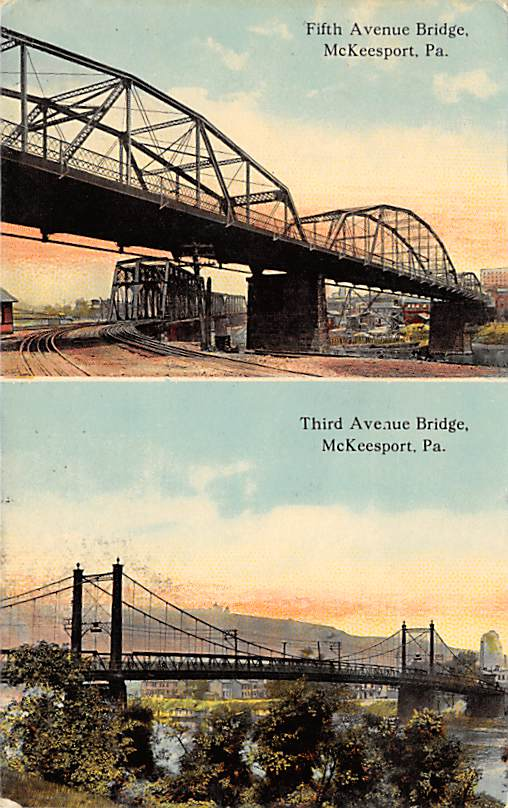
A postcard showing the Fifth Avenue Bridge and the Third Avenue Bridge. The original McKeesport railroad bridge can also be seen.

Originally, the Fifth Avenue Bridge stood on the site. This 1880's truss structure mainly served streetcar traffic and was inadequate for automobiles. It was intended that after the Jerome Street Bridge opened that the older, downstream Third Avenue Bridge (1884) would also be demolished. This suspension bridge structure was also unsafe for continued automobile use. A petition signed by 5,000 people made the Allegheny County commissioners reconsider the plan. The Third Avenue Bridge was kept open for pedestrians only, but was eventually demolished in 1960.

After the city renamed Jerome Street which approached the bridge after incumbent Republican Mayor George Lysle, they proposed that the Youghiogheny crossing receive the same eponym. However, the Franklin Roosevelt administration contended that public works dollars could not be used to memorialize living officeholders. As a result, the Jerome Street designation was chosen, and it remains in place today, although it is sometimes referred to as the Lysle Boulevard Bridge.

== Rehabilitation projects ==
A 2022 project replaced the bridge deck using polyester polymer concrete, repaired the concrete substructure, and replaced the bridge bearings. The work was completed in November 2022.
