= Westinghouse Memorial =

George Westinghouse Memorial
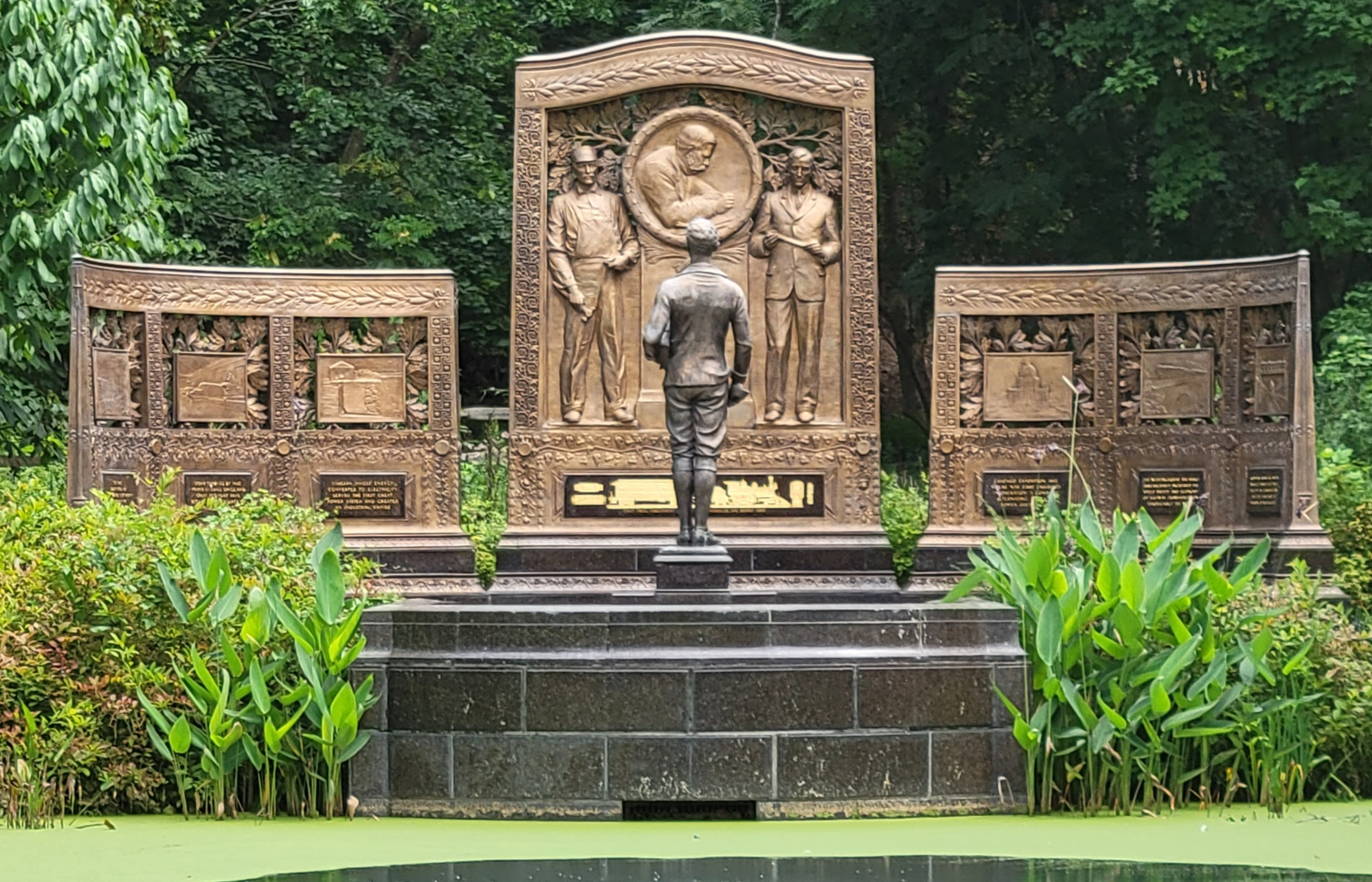
- Interactive map of George Westinghouse Memorial
- Location: Schenley Park, Pittsburgh, Pennsylvania
- Coordinates: 40°26′22″N 79°56′34″W
- Material: Bronze, Norwegian granite
- Opening date: 6 October 1930
- Dedicated to: George Westinghouse

The George Westinghouse Memorial is a bronze monument located in the U.S. city of Pittsburgh, Pennsylvania. It commemorates George Westinghouse, an engineer, founder of the Westinghouse Electric Corporation, and inventor of the railway air brake. The memorial is located at the entrance to the Steven Faloon trail, a part of Schenley Park. The architects for the monument and the surrounding area were Henry Hornbostel and Eric Fisher Wood. Daniel Chester French was the sculptor for the statue and the main panel, and Paul Fjelde designed the side panels.

The memorial consists of a statue of a schoolboy, who represents "The Spirit of the American Youth". He looks on at three panels that represent the life of George Westinghouse and is presumed to draw inspiration from them. The memorial is made of bronze and granite. It is one of many mementos to George Westinghouse in the area. Some additional honors include Westinghouse Park, George Westinghouse Memorial Bridge, and the George Westinghouse, Jr., Birthplace and Boyhood Home.

The current location of the memorial is near the back of Carnegie Mellon University in the Squirrel Hill neighborhood of Pittsburgh. Schenley Drive, a road that runs through the park, is also nearby. In 2019, the memorial was designated a historic landmark by the city of Pittsburgh.

== History ==
The Pittsburgh City Council first proposed building a memorial to George Westinghouse in 1916, two years after his death. Initially the memorial was planned for Westinghouse's former estate in Point Breeze North, Solitude, which is now the site of Westinghouse Park. However, in 1926 the City Council accepted a proposal to build the memorial in Schenley Park instead. The project was overseen by the Westinghouse Memorial Association and took four years to plan and execute. Pittsburgh architects Henry Hornbostel and Eric Fisher Wood were chosen to design the memorial, and Daniel Chester French (best known for his statue of Abraham Lincoln at the Lincoln Memorial) and Paul Fjelde created the sculptural elements. The bronze pieces were cast by Gorham Manufacturing Company of Rhode Island. Masaniello Piccirilli, one of the Piccirilli Brothers, spent approximately 14 months carving the wax models used for the castings.

Funding for the memorial came from more than 50,000 Westinghouse employees, who raised a total of $200,000. It was dedicated on Westinghouse's birthday, October 6, 1930, which Pittsburgh mayor Charles H. Kline officially declared to be "Westinghouse Day". All local Westinghouse employees were given the day off from work. The ceremony was attended by approximately 12,000 people, including B. C. Forbes, Francis Hopwood, 1st Baron Southborough, U.S. Labor Secretary James J. Davis, Senator David A. Reed, and a variety of industry leaders like James A. Farrell, David Sarnoff, Gerard Swope, and Samuel M. Vauclain. Westinghouse's old rival Thomas Edison did not attend, but he did send a statement by mail, as did Andrew Mellon and President Herbert Hoover. The keynote address was given by U.S. Representative James F. Burke. A celebratory dinner was also held the night before at the William Penn Hotel.

The bronze memorial was originally covered in gold leaf, which was added "so as to permanently give the monument an interesting surface which will be enhanced by the smoky atmosphere of the city." However, the gilding could be easily scratched off with a knife, and consequently the memorial was repeatedly vandalized with "names, initials, and childish pictures". The city spent $4,000 restoring the monument in 1937, only for it to end up defaced again just four years later. At this point it was decided to remove the gold leaf entirely, which was paid for by the Westinghouse Air Brake Company and completed in December 1941. The memorial was restored again in 1984, including repairs to the American Youth sculpture, which had been toppled by vandals a few years earlier and subsequently removed for safekeeping.

By 2014, the memorial was again in need of attention. The pond infrastructure failed in 2009 and was no longer able to hold water, and the monument had been damaged by winter weather and vandals. In 2015, a new restoration was launched by the Pittsburgh Parks Conservancy and the City of Pittsburgh. The 14-month, $2.7 million project included rebuilding and refilling the pond, replacing pathways, planting new vegetation, and improving storm water management around the site. The memorial was rededicated on October 6, 2016.

== Design ==
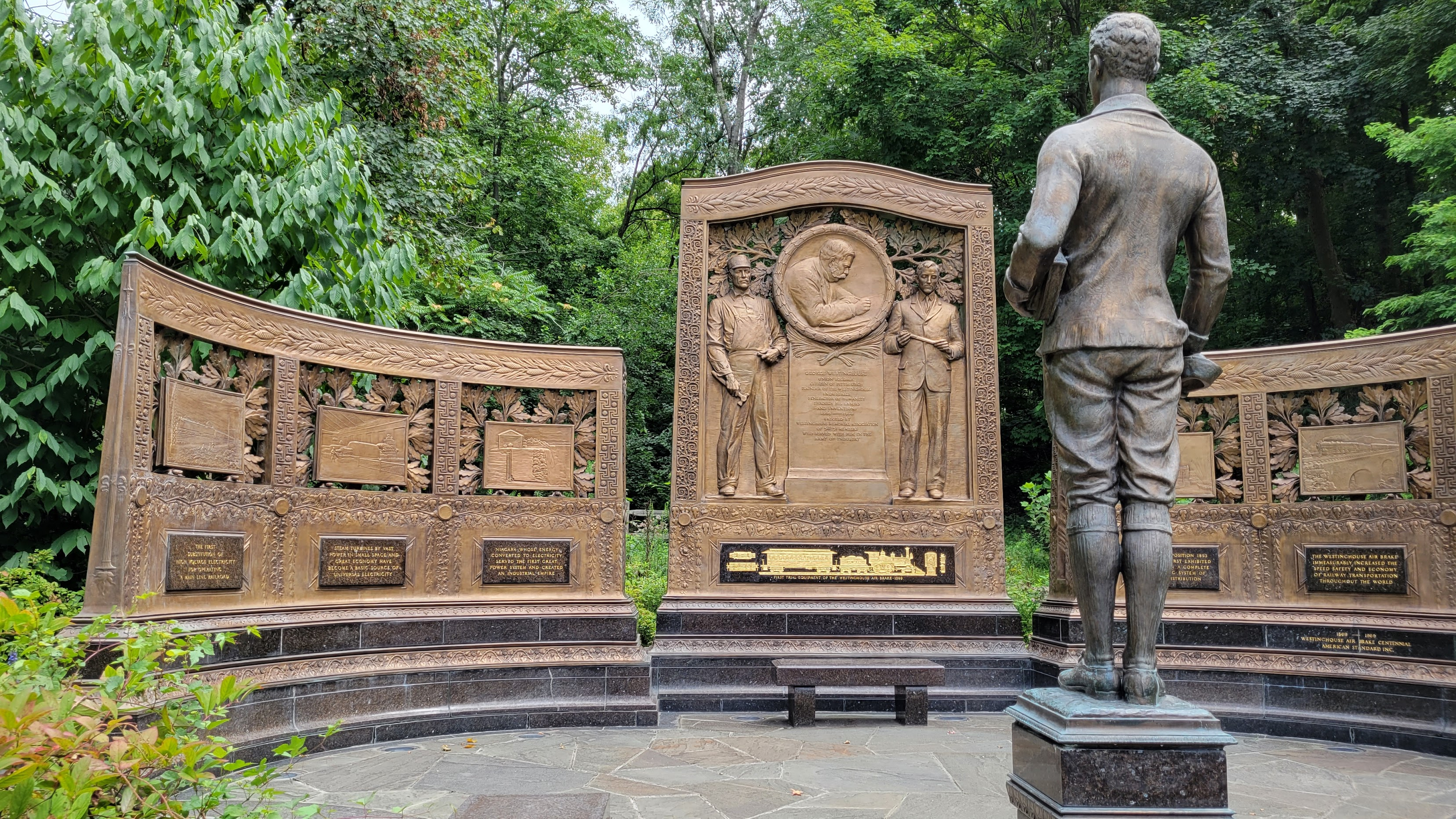
The George Westinghouse Memorial, showing the commemorative panels and the statue of a young student, in Pittsburgh, PA

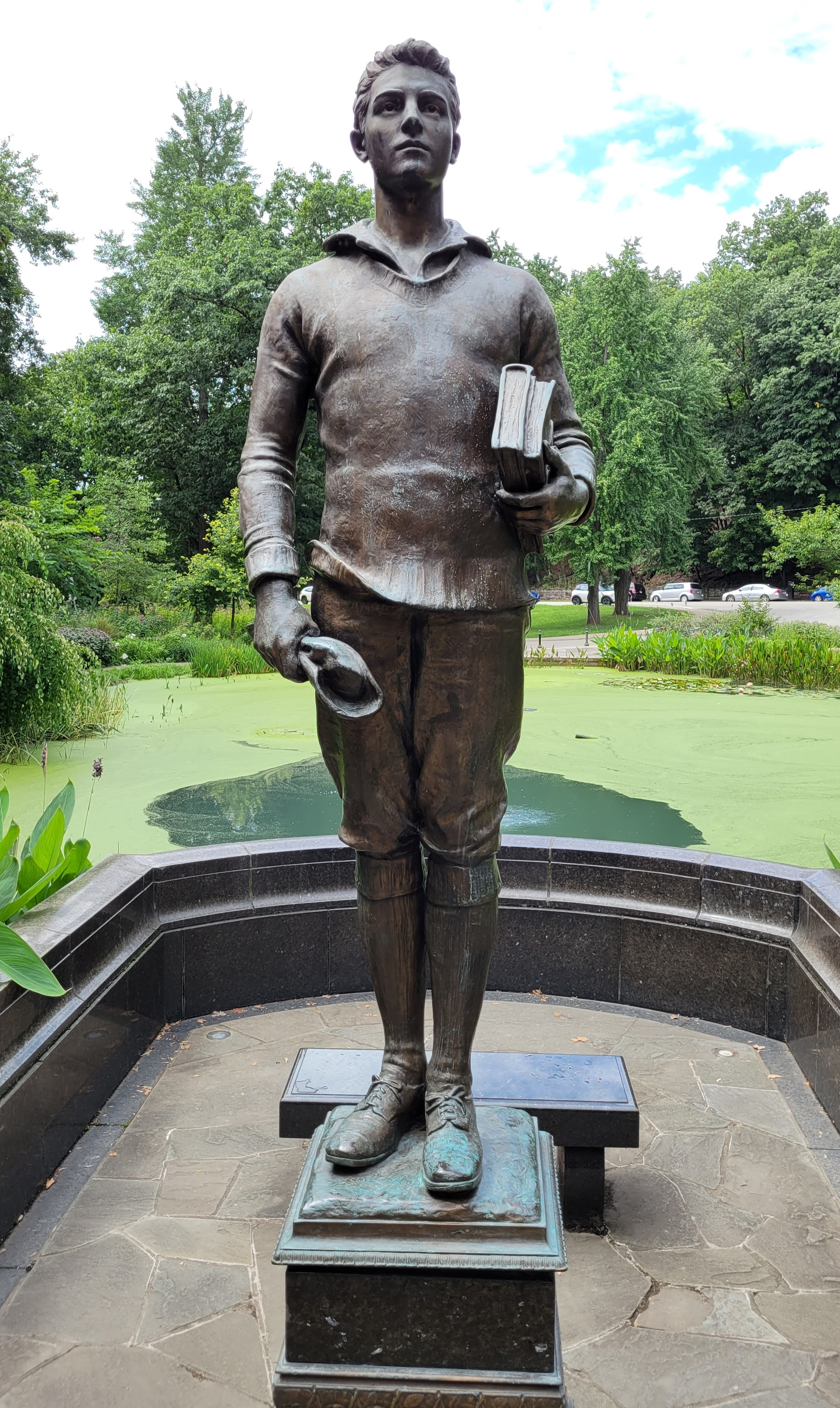
Statue "The Spirit of American Youth" by Daniel Chester French for the George Westinghouse Memorial in Pittsburgh, PA

The memorial consists of three double-sided bronze panels depicting the life of George Westinghouse, a statue of a school-age boy facing the panels, and the surrounding landscape including a lily pond, stone pathways, and black granite benches. The design of the memorial shows a strong Beaux-Arts influence, reflecting Hornbostel and Wood's training at the École des Beaux-Arts in Paris, while also incorporating modern elements like the depiction of contemporary people—a student and two industrial workers—in place of classical figures. Early plans for the memorial showed a more traditional vision with partially draped nymphs flanking the portrait of Westinghouse; these were replaced at the behest of the Westinghouse Memorial Association, who "prevailed upon Mr. French to attempt to produce a 'modern' masterpiece."

=== Panels ===
The three panels are arranged in a semicircle and sit on top of a Norwegian granite base. Each panel is solid bronze. On the central panel, George Westinghouse is depicted at his drafting table in a bas-relief medallion flanked by high-relief figures of a mechanic and an engineer, along with dedicatory text and a granite plaque commemorating the first trial of the Westinghouse air brake. According to the Pittsburgh Press, the models for the two workers were actual Westinghouse employees Thomas Campbell and Anton Kusebauch. The two side panels contain bas-relief images of Westinghouse's engineering accomplishments, including electrification of the New York, New Haven, and Hartford Railroad, the World's Columbian Exposition electrical system, and the Adams Power Plant at Niagara Falls. Each of the six reliefs is supported by a pair of sculpted turtles and set in a rectangular opening above a granite plaque with descriptive text. The side reliefs were sculpted by Paul Fjelde, while Daniel Chester French was responsible for the figural reliefs including Westinghouse and the two workers.

Unusually, some of the sculpted elements continue on the back side of the memorial, creating a multi-layered composition. This includes the backdrop of oak leaves visible through the openings in each panel, which are revealed as a series of fully sculpted trees when viewed from the rear. The back sides of the mechanic and engineer figures are also rendered in full relief. A contemporary report described this as "[a] very unique sculptural effect, one which has never been tried and which taxed the ability of such a genius as Mr. French". Elaborate borders consisting of meanders, floral patterns, and other designs appear throughout. The rear of the memorial also carries a dedication plaque, which reads:

This memorial unveiled October 6, 1930, in honor of George Westinghouse is an enduring testimonial to the esteem, affection and loyalty of 60,000 employees of the great industrial organizations of which he was the founder. In his later years rightly called "The Greatest Living Engineer", George Westinghouse accomplished much of first importance to mankind through his ingenuity, persistence, courage, integrity and leadership. By the invention of the air brake and of automatic signaling devices, he led the world in the development of appliances for the promotion of speed, safety and economy of transportation. By his early vision of the value the alternating current electric system, he brought about a revolution in the transmission of electric power. His achievements were great, his energy and enthusiasm boundless, and his character beyond reproach; a shining mark for the guidance and encouragement of American youth.

=== The Spirit of the American Youth ===
Facing the panels is a life-size bronze statue by Daniel Chester French representing The Spirit of the American Youth. The statue depicts a school-aged boy holding a stack of books in one hand and a crumpled hat in the other as he contemplates the life and accomplishments of George Westinghouse. The statue has a granite pedestal and stands on a peninsula shaped like a ship's prow that projects into the lily pond. At times, the statue has been vandalized by spray paint.

=== Lily pond and surrounding landscape ===
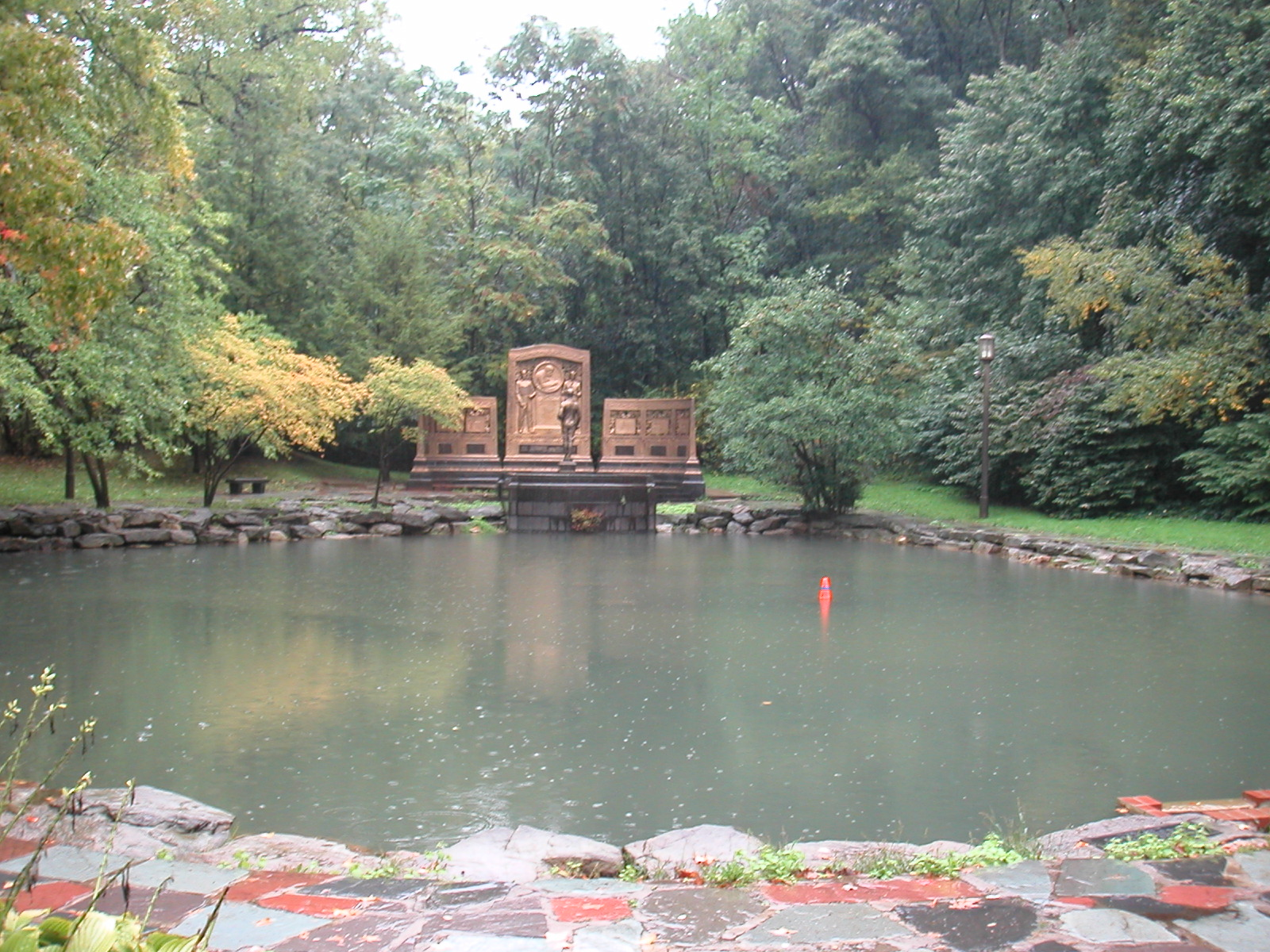
The pond in 2002, prior to being drained and rebuilt.

Landscape elements, including a lily pond, paved walkways, and surrounding vegetation, form an integral part of the memorial design. Some parts of the landscape, like the pond, predate the memorial itself, while others were added during and after construction. Although the landscape has evolved over time, the overall appearance of the memorial site still adheres to its original design principles.

The lily pond was constructed in 1896 and was originally fed by Phipps Run, one of the streams that supplies Panther Hollow Lake. Eventually, the pond became damaged from storm runoff and was switched to a municipal water supply, while Phipps Run was diverted underground. However, the pond continued to deteriorate and had to be drained in 2009. It was rebuilt and refilled during the 2015–16 restoration.

The plantings around the memorial include a variety of trees, shrubs, and perennials. Forty cherry trees, a gift from the Westinghouse Society of Japan, were planted at the memorial in 1931. A further 12 trees were donated in 1965 by Mitsubishi Electric Corporation.

== See also ==
- Public sculptures by Daniel Chester French
