= Frances Fisher Wood =

Educator, lecturer, and scientist

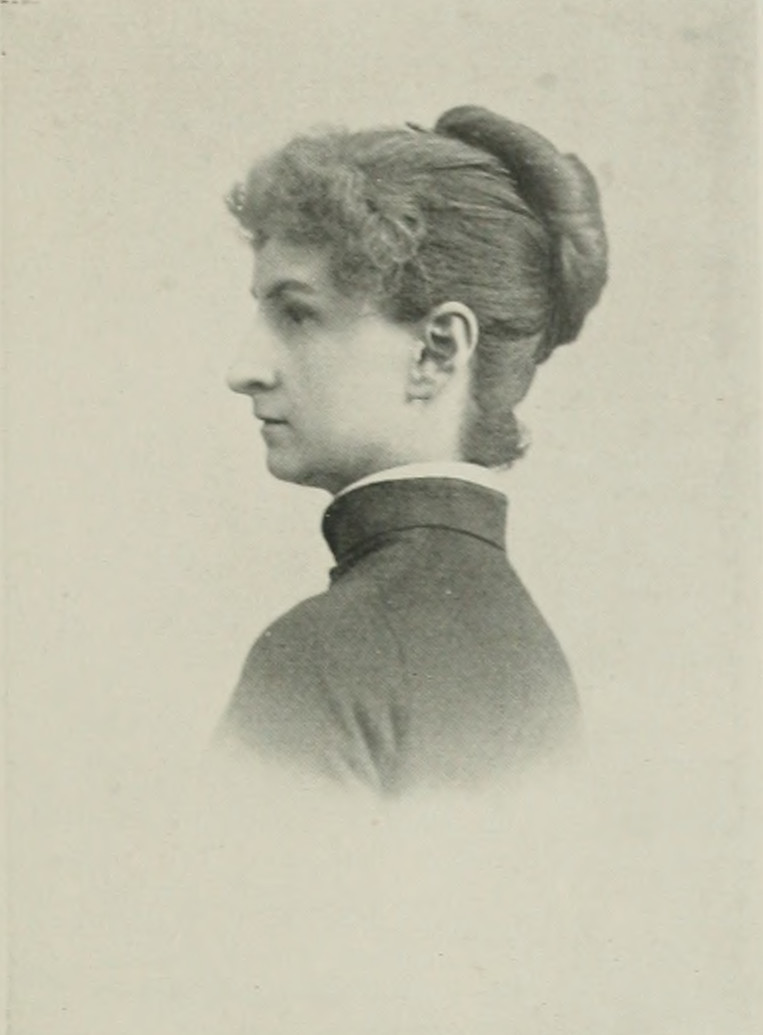
- Born: Frances Fisher; September 22, 1852; Waltham, Massachusetts, U.S.
- Died: August 30, 1938 (aged 85); Bedford, Pennsylvania, U.S.
- Occupations: Educational reformer and scientist
- Spouse: William Benjamin Wood (m. 1886; died 1929)
- Children: Eric Fisher Wood

Frances Fisher Wood (September 22, 1852, Waltham, Massachusetts – August 30, 1938, Bedford, Pennsylvania, sometimes styled Mrs. William Benjamin Wood) was an educator, lecturer, and scientist.

A graduate of Vassar College, Frances Fisher Wood supported women's suffrage and education. She was a teacher and principal at what later became the Hathaway Brown School for Girls in Cleveland, Ohio; lectured and published a book on the scientific upbringing of infants and children (Infancy and Childhood, 1897); developed the first commercial business in the United States for the sterilization of milk for infants; and was a founder and one of the original trustees of Barnard College for women.

== Early life ==
Frances Fisher was born on September 22, 1852, in Waltham, Massachusetts where her mother was visiting. She grew up with her parents, Waldo Asahel Fisher (1822-1912) and Angeline (Hawes) Fisher (1827-1913) in Ohio. Her family background qualified her as a member of the Colonial Dames of the State of New York (incorporated on April 28, 1893) and as one of the General Society of Mayflower Descendants (formed 1897).

== Vassar College ==
Frances Fisher attended Vassar College as part of the Class of 1874. The school's first graduates had been the Class of 1867. Speaking to the graduating class in 1924, Fisher recalled attitudes to women students 50 years earlier.

You, of a younger generation, could hardly credit as seriously intended, the many vehement arguments which, in our day, were supposed to prove that a college education for girls was dangerous if not impossible. Many books were written, numerous lectures given and magazine articles poured out in a flood urging that no girl could endure the strain of higher education, that it would certainly wreck her health, decrease her charm, and diminish her fertility. Finally as a last and most crushing edict our opponents declared that, even if perchance some small number of college girls should escape the dire calamities predicted, at least it was quite certain that no man would choose to marry any woman so pedantic.

At Vassar, Frances Fisher studied mathematics and astronomy with Maria Mitchell. At the Eighteenth Congress of the AAW on October 15, 1890, Wood was one of several women to present a paper of reminiscences to honor Maria Mitchell. She also contributed a chapter about Mitchell to The National Exposition Souvenir: What America Owes to Women, a memorial book for the World's Columbian Exposition in 1893.

While a student at Vassar, Frances Fisher was an enthusiastic proponent of "rational dress", petitioning for the right to wear a "mountain dress, consisting of a short kilted skirt and a comfortable jacket." She successfully led a "Petticoat war", popularizing the shortening of skirts and the removal of heavy petticoats.

Fisher graduated from Vassar College in 1874, as president of her class. Fisher was a founding member and the first president of the Cleveland, Ohio branch of Vassar College Alumnae. She later served as president of the alumnae association of Vassar College, from 1878-1879.

== Educational work in Cleveland ==
Returning to Cleveland, Frances Fisher became a teacher of higher mathematics at the Brooks Memorial School. Also known as Brooks Academy, the preparatory school for boys was founded under the leadership of headmaster John S. White in 1874, in memory of the Rev. Frederic Brooks. A girls' branch was opened in 1876, under the direction of Mrs. M. E. Salisbury, and soon taken over by Frances Fisher. Fisher taught from 1876 to 1882, and held the position of principal from 1882 to 1886. In 1886, Fisher sold the girls school to Anne Hathaway Brown, who renamed it Anne H. Hathaway Brown's School for Girls. It is still in operation. as the Hathaway Brown School.

== Marriage ==
On August 10, 1886, in Cleveland, Ohio, Frances Fisher married Dr. William Benjamin Wood (1851-1929). The Woods had one son, Eric Fisher Wood, born in 1888.

William B. Wood was a doctor in New York City. The Woods lived at No. 22 E 41st street, at No. 17 East 38th Street, and later at No. 33 West 47th Street. Their staff of four included a Japanese butler, Hiroishi Sakamine. In 1917, the Woods sold No. 33 West 47th Street for $60,000.

The Woods were part of a summer colony formed in the 1880s at Onteora ("Hills of the Sky") in the Catskill Mountains. Frances Fisher Wood designed their house, "Yamaga", following a Japanese style of architecture that emphasized low lines, simplicity and lack of ornamentation.

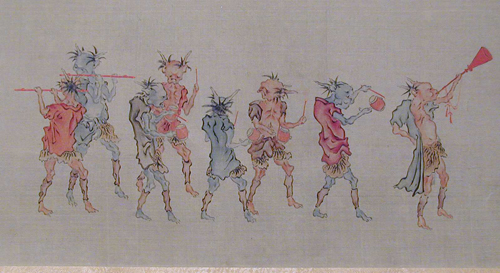
Momotaro and Devils in Procession, Detail of hand scroll by Katsushika Hokusai

She was variously described as a "Japanese scholar and expert" and an "Oriental art expert and dealer". Items that she owned were later given to the Memorial Art Gallery at the University of Rochester.

== Science ==
Between 1880 and 1895, Frances Fisher Wood was active as a lecturer and writer on various topics, including women's education, philanthropy, political economy, and science. She was a proponent of the theory of evolution, arguing for its relevance to topics including philanthropy and the care of young children.

Following the birth of her son Eric in 1888, Francis Fisher Wood became interested in infant and child care, particularly artificial nourishment, infant food and digestion. Based on her research, she argued that the only artificial food appropriate for infants was sterilized milk.

From 1890-1895 Frances Fisher Wood developed her own business, Kingwood Farm in Kingston, New Hampshire. It was the first facility in the United States to produce sterilized milk suitable for use by infants and children in commercial quantities. She developed and patented her own processes for sterilization, with the goal of killing germs while otherwise preserving the value of the milk. She started her own farm in the countryside because it was difficult to obtain good results in the city.

The farm is in the pine districts of New Hampshire where there is fine air and fine food for the cattle. Everything about the barns is as cleanly as science and sunshine can make them. No hay is stored in the cows' barn lest the dust infect the milk, and no bedding is kept on the floor. The cows are of the finest Jersey blood—each registered at the American Cattle Club. They are regularly inspected by a physician and are given the best of care... Their food is studied and apportioned so that they shall give the richest milk rather than a great quantity of it. The Kingwood" standard demands twenty per cent, cream—the "choice milk" at city markets, nine per cent. As soon as the milk is taken from the cow it is bottled, hermetically sealed, and steamed in the sterilizing house. Every part of the apparatus used in the process is antiseptically clean—as instruments for a surgical operation; and until the bottles are uncorked for use there is no source of contamination. If the milk were allowed to stand uncorked after it has once been opened, it would absorb germs as would any other milk. Therefore, knowing that human nature is prone to forget seventy times seven, Mrs. Wood has rounded the bottles so that they cannot be set down uncorked.

She advocated for the scientific education of mothers, and published a book on children's care and education, Infancy and Childhood (1897). In it she discussed topics such as rational dress for children and the prevention of disease. She also presented statistics to support the idea that the children of college-educated women were healthy, to refute the idea that education would make women unfit as mothers.

== Women and education in New York ==
Frances Fisher Wood was one of the founders of the Public Education Society in New York, established in 1888. She served as a vice-president of the organization, which was intended for the investigation and reform of the public school system.

After being recruited by Ella Weed (Vassar, 1873) she became one of the founders, incorporators and first trustees of Barnard College for women. She recommended having a board of trustees entirely of women, but the board was eventually composed evenly of men and women. She served on the board from its founding in 1889 to 1895.

For several years Frances Fisher Wood was a director of the Association for the Advancement of Women (AAW). She was also involved with the National Council of Women of the United States, served on the executive board of the University Extension Society, and was a member of the Wednesday Afternoon Club, Women's University Club, and Association of Collegiate Alumnæ.

== World War I ==
During World War I Frances Fisher Wood worked on a volunteer basis writing publicity articles for Camp Sherman, Ohio. Her son Eric Fisher Wood was an officer there in 1917.
