= South Tenth Street Bridge =

- Coordinates: 40°25′57.06″N 79°59′21.17″W
- Carries: 4 lanes of roadway
- Crosses: Monongahela River
- Locale: Pittsburgh, Pennsylvania
- Official name: Philip Murray Bridge
- Owner: Allegheny County

Characteristics
- Design: Suspension bridge
- Total length: 1,275 feet (389 m)
- Width: 58 feet (18 m)
- Longest span: 725 feet (221 m)
- Clearance below: 50.3 feet (15.3 m)

History
- Opened: February 11, 1933

Statistics
- Daily traffic: 17,500 (2017)
- South Tenth Street Bridge
- U.S. National Register of Historic Places
- Built: 1931–33
- Architectural style: Streamline Moderne
- NRHP reference No.: 86000020
- Added to NRHP: January 7, 1986

Location
- Interactive map of South Tenth Street Bridge

The South Tenth Street Bridge, most often called the Tenth Street Bridge, but officially dubbed the Philip Murray Bridge, is a suspension bridge that spans the Monongahela River in Downtown Pittsburgh, Pennsylvania.

The only cable suspension bridge that is located in Allegheny County, its 725-foot (221 m) main span is the longest on the Monongahela River. The bridge was renamed on Labor Day 2007 for Philip Murray, the first president of the United Steelworkers of America.

Built between 1931 and 1933, this bridge connects South Tenth Street on the South Side to Second Avenue and the Armstrong Tunnel under the Bluff. A staircase leads from the northern terminus of the bridge up to the campus of Duquesne University on the Bluff.

In 2015, the bridge was one of three bridges to have bike specific lanes installed. It was listed on the National Register of Historic Places in 1986.

== Description ==
The Tenth Street Bridge is 1,275 feet (389 m) long and has a main span of 725 feet (221 m). It is the only conventional cable suspension bridge in Allegheny County, unlike the Three Sisters which use eyebars instead of cables.

The two cables, each 13 inches (33 cm) in diameter, are anchored in concrete vaults at either end of the span and travel over two 160-foot (49 m) towers resting on stone piers. Suspender cables, arranged in pairs which are spaced 25 feet (7.6 m) apart, transfer the load of the bridge deck to the main cables. There are 28 sets of suspender cables on the main span and 10 on each side span.

The towers and railings are decorated with Streamline Moderne details, attributed to architect Stanley Roush.

The bridge superstructure is painted in the signature "Aztec Gold" color used on several other downtown bridges in Pittsburgh.

== History ==
=== First bridge ===
A private toll bridge connecting what was then the borough of Birmingham to Pittsburgh at McKee Street (now South 10th Street) was first proposed by the Birmingham Bridge and Road Company, incorporated in 1837. The company also had license to construct a turnpike along Denman Street (South 12th Street) extending to the Monongahela and Coal Hill Turnpike (modern day Arlington Avenue and William Street). The project languished for many years until the company was reincorporated as the Birmingham Bridge Company in 1853, having fully abandoned plans to construct the turnpike. The company completed a three-span, covered wooden lattice truss bridge in 1859. In 1896, the city of Pittsburgh purchased the bridge for $305,000 and abolished the 1-cent toll.

=== Second bridge ===
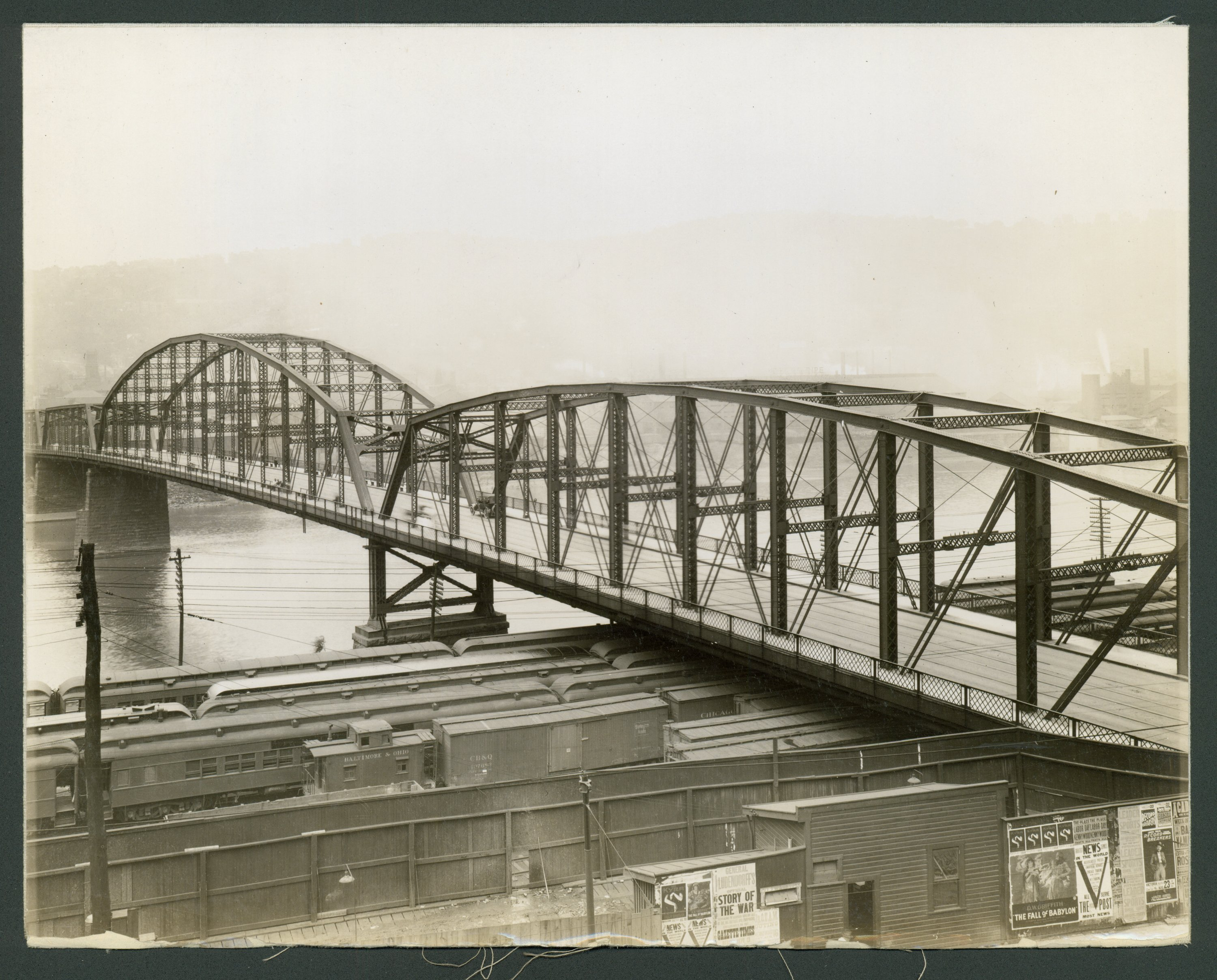
The 1904 bridge

The wooden bridge was in poor condition by the early 1900s and was demolished in 1902. A new steel bridge was completed in 1904. This bridge was a five-span Pratt truss, 50 feet (15 m) wide and 1,400 feet (430 m) long. It was constructed on the two piers remaining from the previous bridge and two new piers.

In 1927, the Armstrong Tunnel was completed, linking the north end of the bridge with Forbes Avenue.

=== Third bridge ===
In 1928, Allegheny County voters approved a $43.7 million bond issue to fund a variety of public works, including the West End Bridge, McKees Rocks Bridge, Saw Mill Run Boulevard, Allegheny River Boulevard, and Allegheny County Airport. Also included was funding to replace the Tenth Street Bridge, which was considered to be unsafe for heavy vehicles even though it was not very old. Ownership of the bridge was also transferred from the city to Allegheny County. The existing bridge was demolished in 1931 by the Vang Construction Company, which was also responsible for building the substructure of the replacement bridge. The new suspension bridge was designed by the office of Allegheny County Chief Engineer Vernon R. Covell, with architectural elements designed by Stanley Roush, and the contract for the superstructure was awarded to the American Bridge Company.

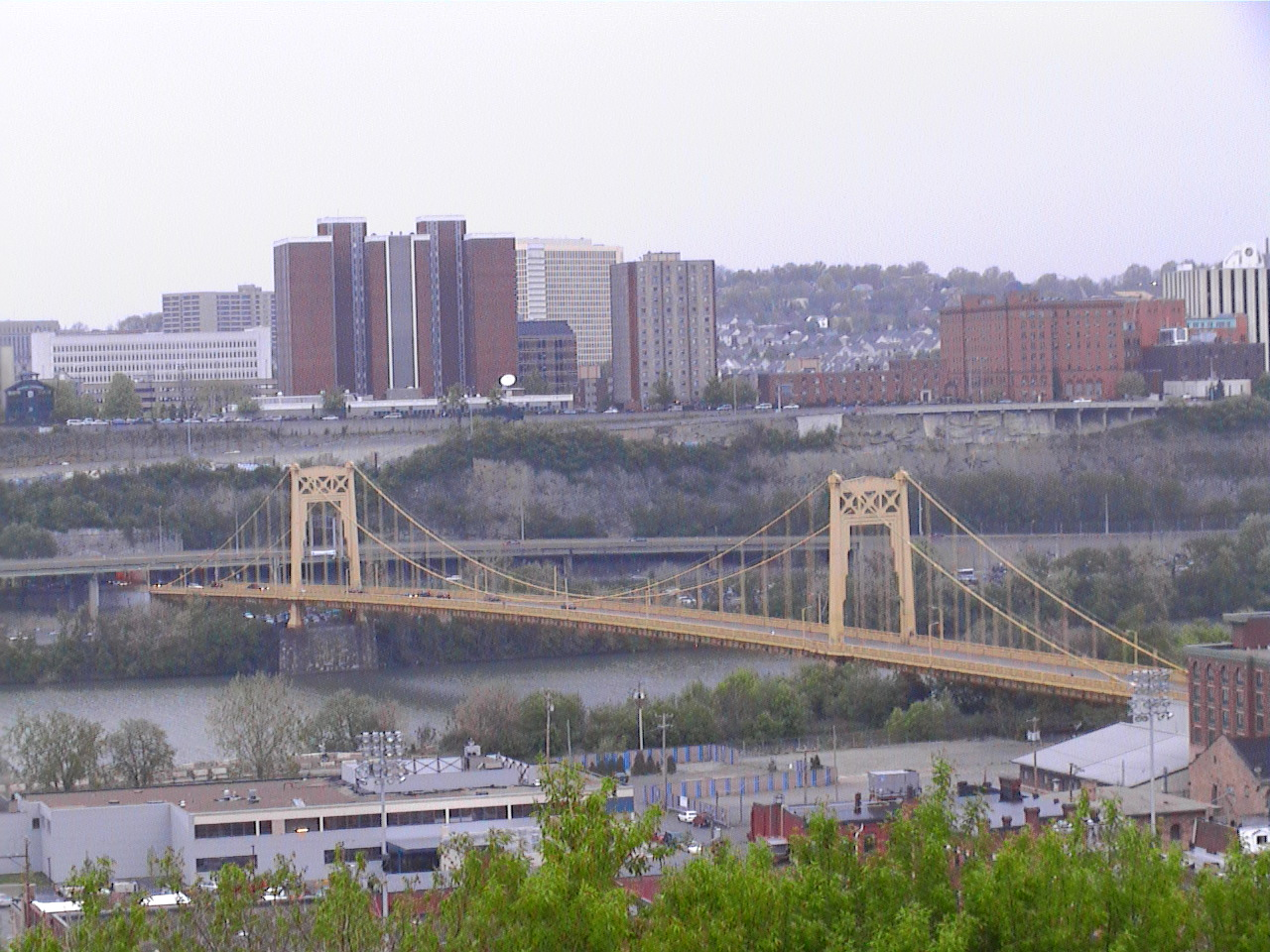
View of bridge and Duquesne University from the South

The bridge was constructed in 1931–33. After construction of the piers and 116-foot (35 m) towers, workers on suspended catwalks began spinning the two 13-inch (33 cm) diameter steel cables in February, 1932. Each cable was wound from 19 bundles of 256 wires each, for a total of more than 2,500 miles (4,000 km) of wire in the entire bridge. After this work was complete, the structural steel superstructure and bridge deck were installed. The bridge opened with little fanfare on February 11, 1933. The total cost of the project was about $1.6 million.

The Mount Washington Roadway Extension, now the P.J. McArdle Roadway, was completed in September, 1933, providing a highway connection from the south end of the bridge to the Liberty Tunnel and Mount Washington. In addition to road traffic, the bridge was also used by Pittsburgh Railways streetcars on the 53 Carrick route. The line was rerouted to the Smithfield Street Bridge in 1968.

By the 1970s, many parts of the bridge had deteriorated, particularly the deck and electrical system. A $1.8 million rehabilitation project was completed in 1978–79, including structural repairs, deck and sidewalk replacement, painting, and removal of the streetcar tracks. The bridge was rehabilitated again in 2017–19 by the American Bridge Company at a cost of $21.1 million. This project included replacement of the deck, sidewalks, and lighting, structural repairs, painting, waterproofing, and installation of a novel system to dehumidify the bridge cables.

== Geese ==
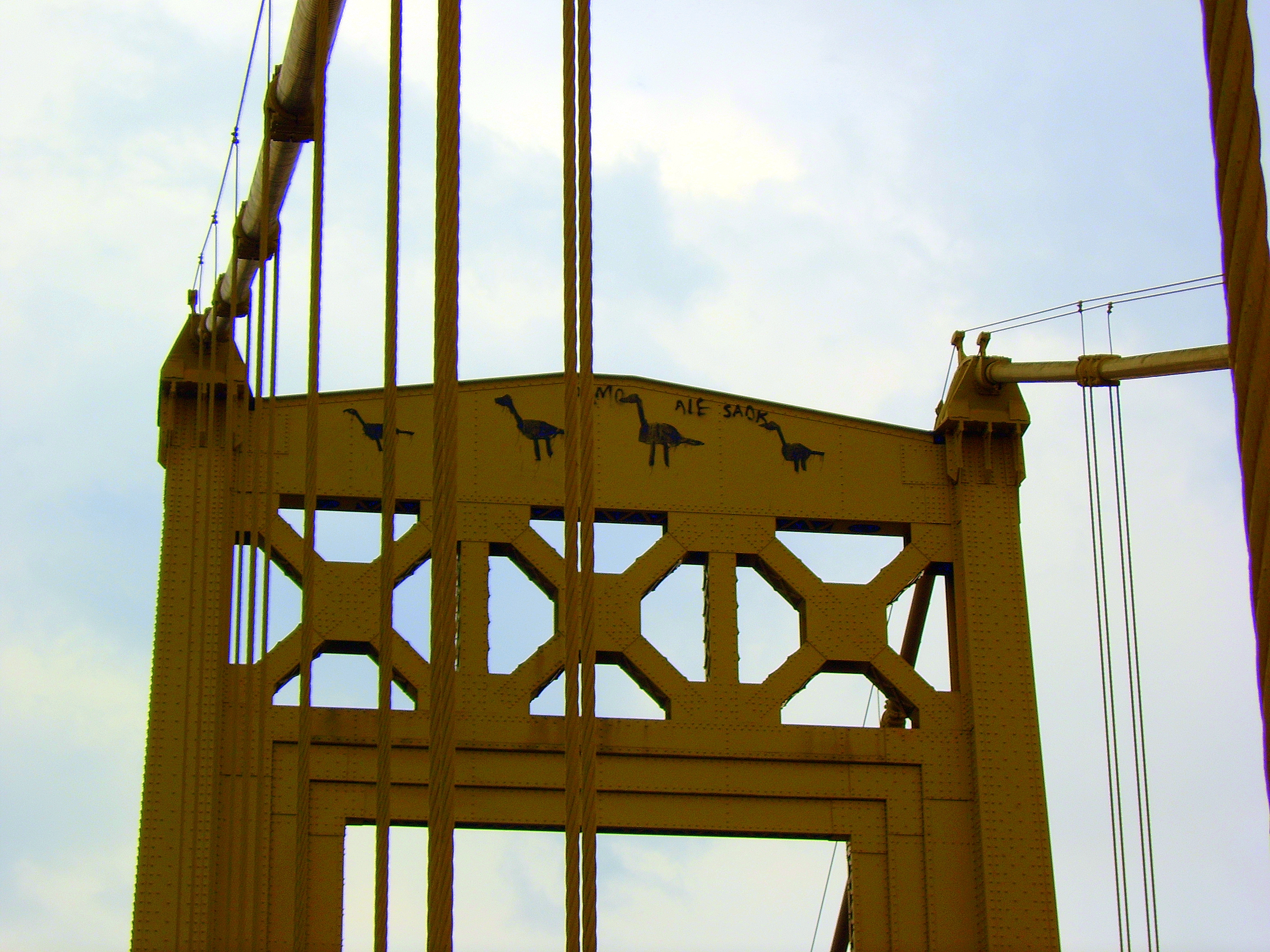
The geese as seen in 2005

The Tenth Street Bridge is known locally for its painted figures of four geese (sometimes described as dinosaurs or "dino-geese") at the top of the south tower, described as "quirky icons" by the Pittsburgh Tribune-Review. Originally an unsanctioned work of street art created in the 1990s, the geese were painted over when the bridge was repainted in 2018. The original artist, Tim Kaulen, launched a petition to restore the geese which gathered enough signatures to win approval from the Allegheny County Council. Kaulen repainted the geese with official permission in October, 2018.

== See also ==
- Armstrong Tunnel
- List of crossings of the Monongahela River
