= Vernon R. Covell =

American engineer

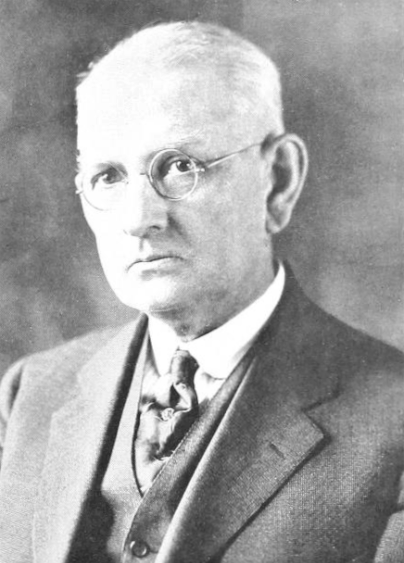
- Born: Vernon Royce Covell; December 13, 1866; Jefferson, Ohio, US
- Died: December 21, 1949 (aged 83); Wilkinsburg, Pennsylvania, US
- Burial place: Woodlawn Cemetery, Wilkinsburg
- Occupation: Civil engineer
- Spouse: Corrie Bailey (m. 1897)
- Children: 1

Vernon Royce Covell (1866–1949) was an American engineer. He was chief engineer of the Allegheny County Public Works Department.

A number of his works are listed on the National Register of Historic Places.

== Biography ==
Vernon R. Covell was born in Jefferson, Ohio on December 13, 1866. He graduated from Ohio State University with a degree in civil engineering in 1895.

He married Corrie Bailey on October 6, 1897, and they had one daughter.

Covell died at his home in Wilkinsburg, Pennsylvania on December 21, 1949, and was buried at Woodlawn Cemetery.

== Selected works ==
- Armstrong Tunnel, between Forbes and Second Aves. at S. Tenth St. Pittsburgh, PA (Covell, Vernon R.), NRHP-listed
- Liberty Bridge, over the Monongahela River Pittsburgh, PA (Covell, V. R.), NRHP-listed
- McKees Rocks Bridge, LR 76, Spur 2, over Ohio River at Bellevue Bellevue, PA (Covell, V. R.), NRHP-listed
- Rachel Carson Bridge, Allegheny River at Ninth St. Pittsburgh, PA (Covell, Vernon R.), NRHP-listed
- Andy Warhol Bridge, Allegheny River at Seventh St. Pittsburgh, PA (Covell, Vernon R.), NRHP-listed
- Roberto Clemente Bridge, Allegheny River at Sixth St. Pittsburgh, PA (Covell, Vernon R.), NRHP-listed
- South Tenth Street Bridge, Monongahela River at S. Tenth St. Pittsburgh, PA (Covell, Vernon R.), NRHP-listed
- George Westinghouse Bridge, over the Turtle Creek Valley (Covell, Vernon R.)

His leadership and relative contribution vis-a-vis others in one design project is discussed in a HAER document.

He was author of "The Bridge-Raising Program on the Allegheny River in Allegheny County," an article in the Proceedings of the Engineers' Society of Western Pennsylvania 41 (1925): 83, and author of "Erecting a Self-Anchored Suspension Bridge—Seventh Street Bridge at Pittsburgh," in the Engineering News-Record 97 (1926): 502.
