= Charles Anderson Memorial Bridge =

Bridge in Pittsburgh

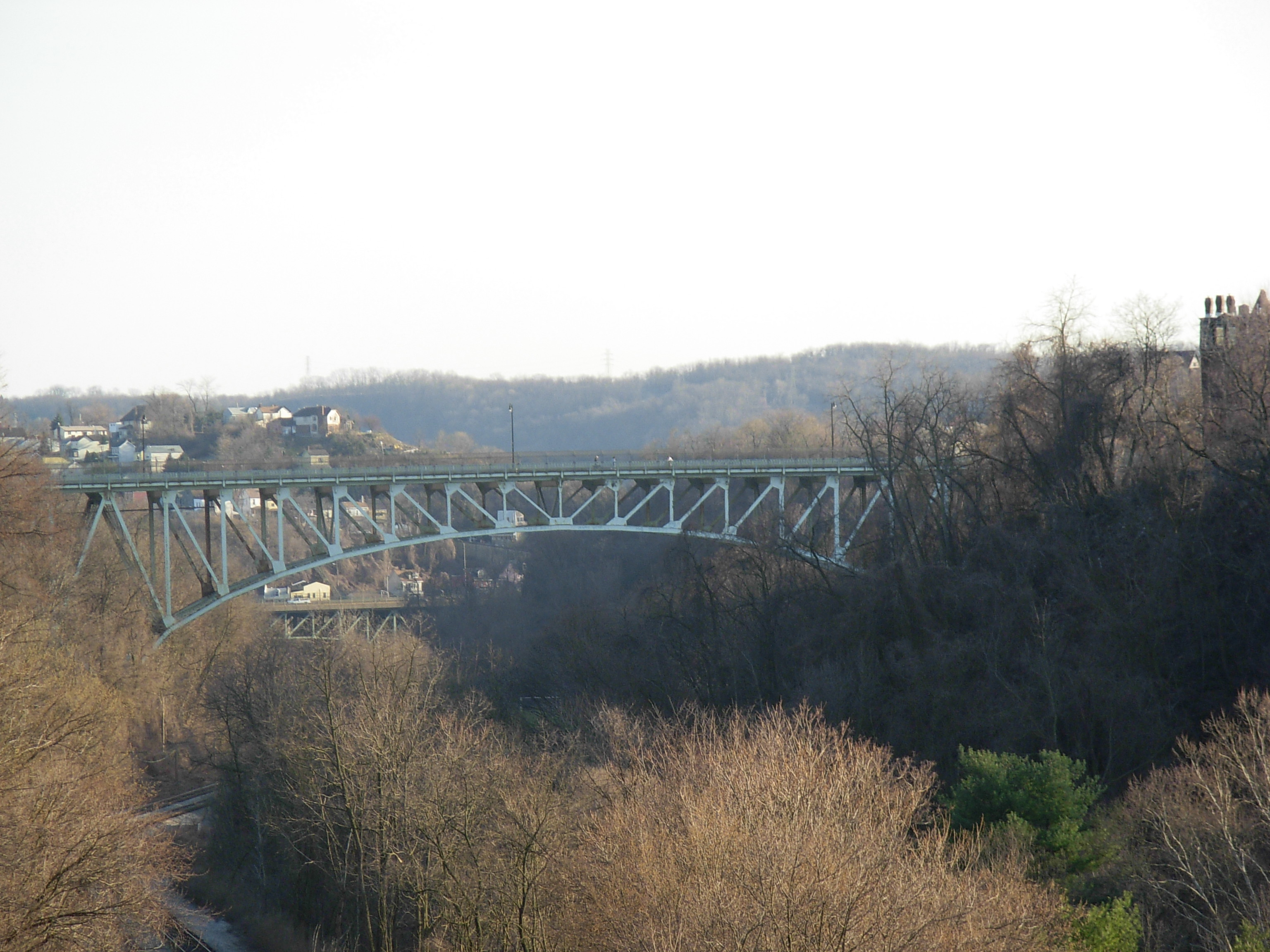
- The bridge in 2007
- Coordinates: 40°26′04″N 79°56′59″W
- Crosses: Junction Hollow
- Named for: Charles Anderson, Pittsburgh city councilor

Characteristics
- Material: Steel
- Total length: 780 feet (240 m)
- Width: 58 feet (18 m)
- Longest span: 360 feet (110 m)
- No. of spans: 3

History
- Constructed by: Fort Pitt Bridge Company
- Construction cost: $772,000
- Opened: April 4, 1940
- Charles Anderson Memorial Bridge
- U.S. Historic district – Contributing property
- Built: 1938–1940
- Architectural style: Streamline Moderne
- Part of: Schenley Park Historic District (ID85003506)
- Designated CP: November 13, 1985

Location
- Interactive map of Charles Anderson Memorial Bridge

The Charles Anderson Memorial Bridge is a steel deck truss bridge located in Pittsburgh, Pennsylvania, United States. The bridge carries the four-lane roadway of Boulevard of the Allies across a ravine known as Junction Hollow, connecting the neighborhoods of Central Oakland and South Oakland with Schenley Park. The bridge also spans the Junction Hollow Trail and P&W Subdivision railroad tracks which run along the bottom of the valley.

The Anderson Bridge is a notable example of a Wichert truss, a rare bridge type with few surviving examples. The Wichert truss is a type of modified continuous truss using a quadrilateral section over each support to make it statically determinate. The design was patented by Pittsburgh civil engineer Edward M. Wichert in 1930. The Anderson Bridge is one of two Wichert truss bridges in Pittsburgh along with the Homestead Grays Bridge.

The bridge is a contributing property in the Schenley Park Historic District. It was also assessed by the Pennsylvania Department of Transportation and Pennsylvania State Historic Preservation Office to be eligible for individual listing on the National Register of Historic Places under Criterion C, design/construction.

The current steel bridge was completed in 1940 and is the second bridge at this location. It replaced the former Wilmot Street Bridge, which was built in 1907.

On February 1, 2023, the bridge was closed for emergency repairs, with officials announcing a three-year closure for rehabilitation shortly thereafter.

== Design ==
The Anderson Bridge is a three-span steel deck truss bridge using the Wichert truss design developed and patented by Edward Martin Wichert (1883–1955). This design behaves like a continuous truss in that the live load of vehicles is distributed across all three spans. Therefore less material is required than a simple truss where each span must support the entire load. However, unlike a continuous truss, it is statically determinate, which was a major advantage in the pre-computer era as the task of calculating stresses in the truss members was greatly simplified. Wichert's design achieves this by incorporating a hinged kite-shaped section above each intermediate support.

Despite the advantages of the Wichert truss, it did not become popular, and only about ten were ever built, mostly in Pennsylvania and Maryland.

The Anderson Bridge is sparsely ornamented with Streamline Moderne details on the piers and railings.

== History ==
=== Wilmot Street Bridge ===
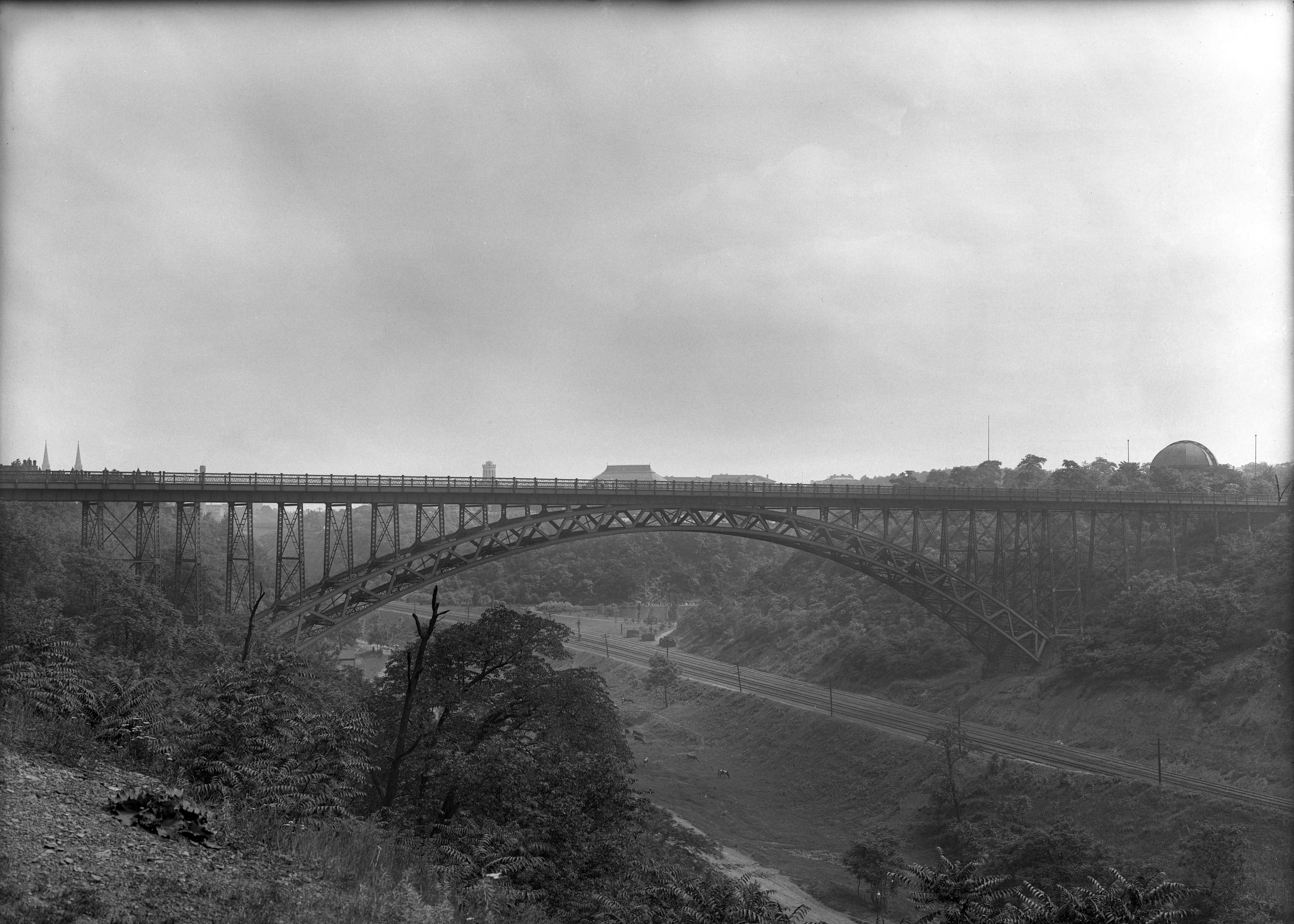
Wilmot Street Bridge in 1914

After Schenley Park was established in 1889, residents of South Oakland wanted a bridge in their neighborhood so they could access the park without traveling to Forbes Avenue. When the original park entrance bridge was replaced by the Schenley Bridge in 1897, it was hoped that the old bridge would be moved to the end of Wilmot Street to provide this South Oakland entrance. However, the old bridge was scrapped instead.

Work finally began on the Wilmot Street Bridge in 1905 and was completed in 1907. The work was marked by labor trouble. When the unionized ironworkers went on strike for higher wages, the American Bridge Company replaced them with non-union strikebreakers and hired Pinkerton detectives to guard the work site. This resulted in several violent confrontations and at least two attempts were made to blow up the bridge with dynamite.

=== Anderson Bridge ===
The two-lane Wilmot Bridge was sufficient at the time it was built. However, when Wilmot Street was widened to become part of Boulevard of the Allies in 1930, the merge from three lanes down to one lane at the bridge became one of Pittsburgh's most notorious traffic bottlenecks. To alleviate this problem, the city began work on a replacement bridge in 1938. The project was partially funded by a grant from the Public Works Administration. The new bridge used the patented Wichert truss design, which the city paid $12,500 to license from the Wichert Continuous Bridge Corporation, and was built by the Fort Pitt Bridge Company. It required 1,920 tons of structural steel, 120 tons of reinforcing steel, and 1,790 feet of iron railing.

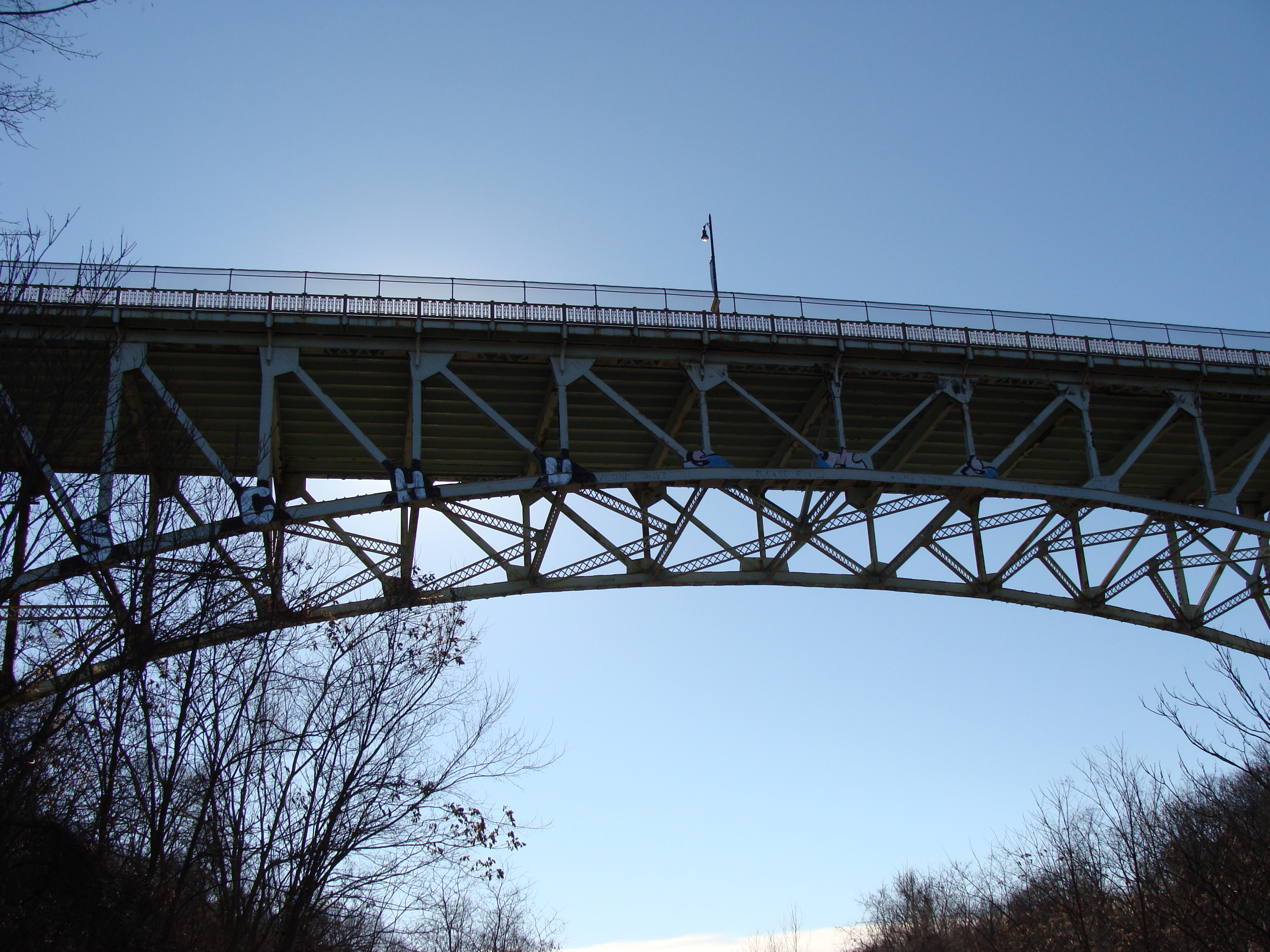
Anderson Bridge as seen from Junction Hollow

In 1939, city officials decided to name the new bridge after the late Charles Anderson (1877–1939), a 20-year member of the Pittsburgh City Council who was a strong supporter of organized labor and whom the Pittsburgh Sun-Telegraph described as a "rugged, two-fisted politician". The bridge opened to traffic in April 1940, after which crews began dismantling the Wilmot Street Bridge immediately to the north. The Charles Anderson Memorial Bridge was formally dedicated two months later on June 22. In addition to the new bridge, the project also included a partial cloverleaf interchange to speed up traffic through Schenley Park.

In 1982, the two outside lanes of the bridge were closed due to structural deterioration. Eventually, a $2.3 million rehabilitation project was undertaken in 1987–88, during which the concrete deck was replaced, and the steel superstructure was repaired and painted. Following this project, the closed lanes were reopened.

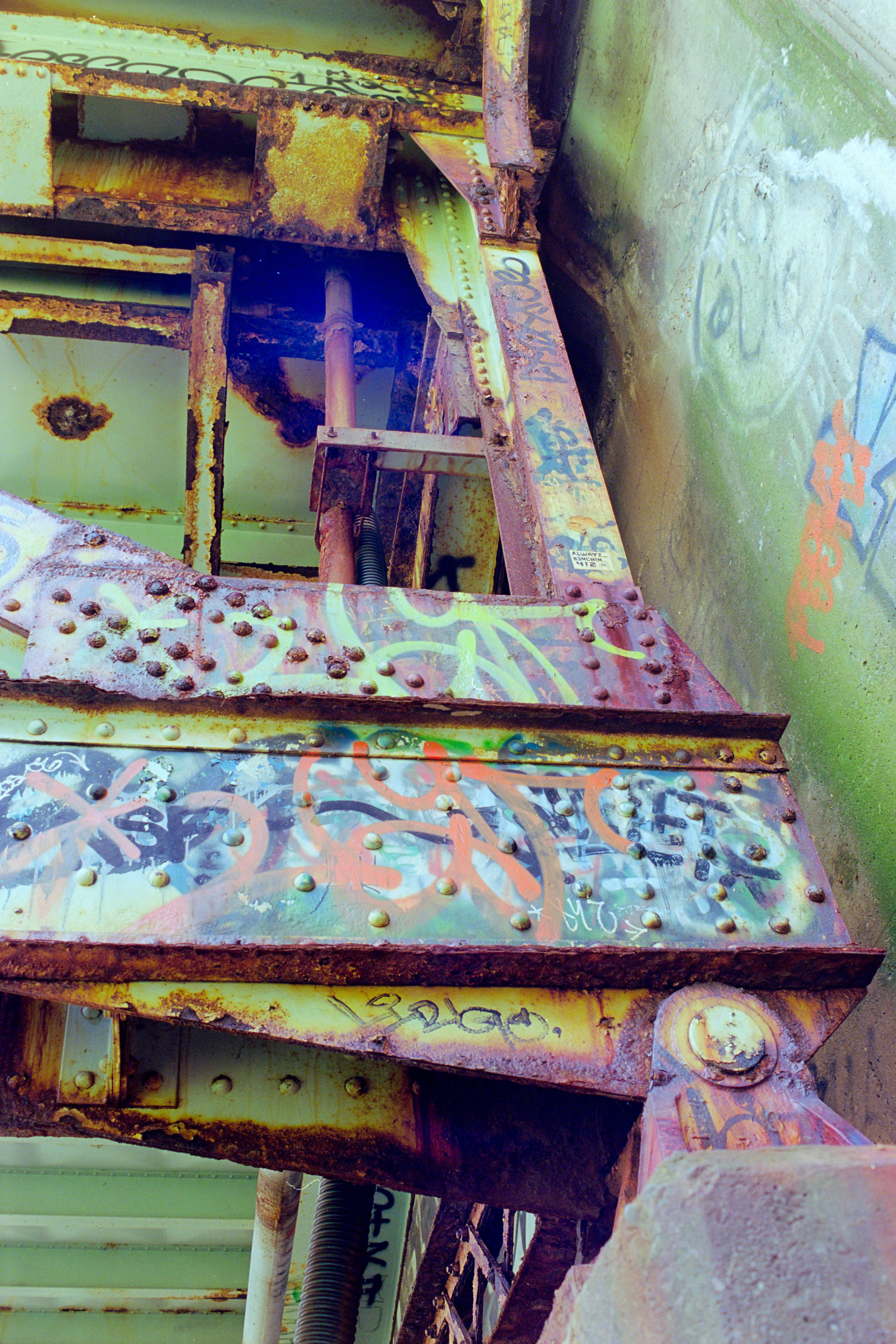
Eastern bridge pier in summer 2023, shortly after closure

As of 2022, the bridge deck, superstructure, and substructure condition were all rated as poor, and the posted weight limit of 32 tons meant the bridge was unable to accommodate the city's largest emergency vehicles. A city feasibility study concluded that the best course of action was to rehabilitate, rather than replace, the historic bridge, with work planned to start in 2025.

On February 1, 2023, city officials announced that the bridge would immediately close to vehicular traffic after a new structural analysis determined it was unsafe. Mayor Ed Gainey said the closure was necessary to prevent "another Fern Hollow", referring to the collapse of the Fern Hollow Bridge one year previously. The bridge was initially expected to remain closed for at least four months for emergency repairs costing $1–2 million, but officials announced a three-year closure for large-scale rehabilitation in March 2023. As of July 2024, construction is planned to begin by the end of the year and last until fall 2026. The project will cost about $50 million and includes replacement of the deck and steel supports, rehabilitation of the truss, piers, abutments, railings, and pylons, and new paint. The sidewalks will also be widened and one of the westbound traffic lanes will be replaced by a two-way bike lane.
