= George Westinghouse Bridge =

- Westinghouse, George, Memorial Bridge
- U.S. National Register of Historic Places
- Pittsburgh Landmark – PHLF
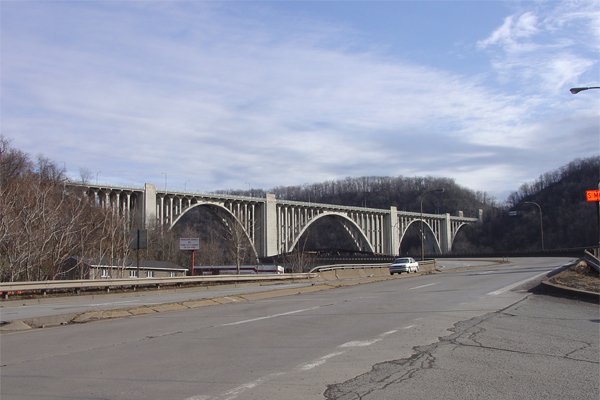
- George Westinghouse Bridge at the western border of North Versailles Township

- Location within Pennsylvania Location within the United States
- Location: US 30 (Lincoln Highway) at Turtle Creek, North Versailles Township, East Pittsburgh, Pennsylvania
- Coordinates: 40°23′38″N 79°50′16″W
- Area: 1 acre (0.40 ha)
- Built: 1929-September 10, 1932
- Architect: Vernon R. Covell and George S. Richardson, engineers; Stanley Roush, architect
- NRHP reference No.: 77001120

Significant dates
- Added to NRHP: March 28, 1977
- Designated PHLF: 1984

George Westinghouse Memorial Bridge in East Pittsburgh, Pennsylvania, carries U.S. Route 30, the Lincoln Highway, over the Turtle Creek Valley near to where it joins the Monongahela River Valley east of Pittsburgh. The reinforced concrete open-spandrel deck arch bridge has a total length of 1,598 feet (487 m) comprising five spans. The longest, central span is 460 feet (140 m), with the deck height 240 feet (73 m) above the valley floor, for a time the world's longest concrete arch span structure. It cost $1.75 million ($41.3 million in 2025 dollars). The design engineers were Vernon R. Covell and George S. Richardson, with architectural design by Stanley Roush. The pylons at the ends of the bridges feature Art Deco reliefs by Frank Vittor.

The bridge is named for George Westinghouse (October 6, 1846 – March 12, 1914), the American entrepreneur and engineer. Nearby was the famous Westinghouse Electric Corporation East Pittsburgh Works, which is now an industrial park. Notable attractions visible while driving across the bridge include the Edgar Thomson Steel Works (U.S. Steel Mon Valley Works) and Kennywood Park.

== Popular culture ==
The bridge was featured in the 2011 film Warrior starring Joel Edgerton and Tom Hardy. A photo of the bridge appears in the 2024 Oscar award winning film, The Brutalist.

== See also ==
- Westinghouse Memorial
- List of bridges documented by the Historic American Engineering Record in Pennsylvania
- List of bridges in the United States by height
