= Eric Fisher Wood =

American engineer

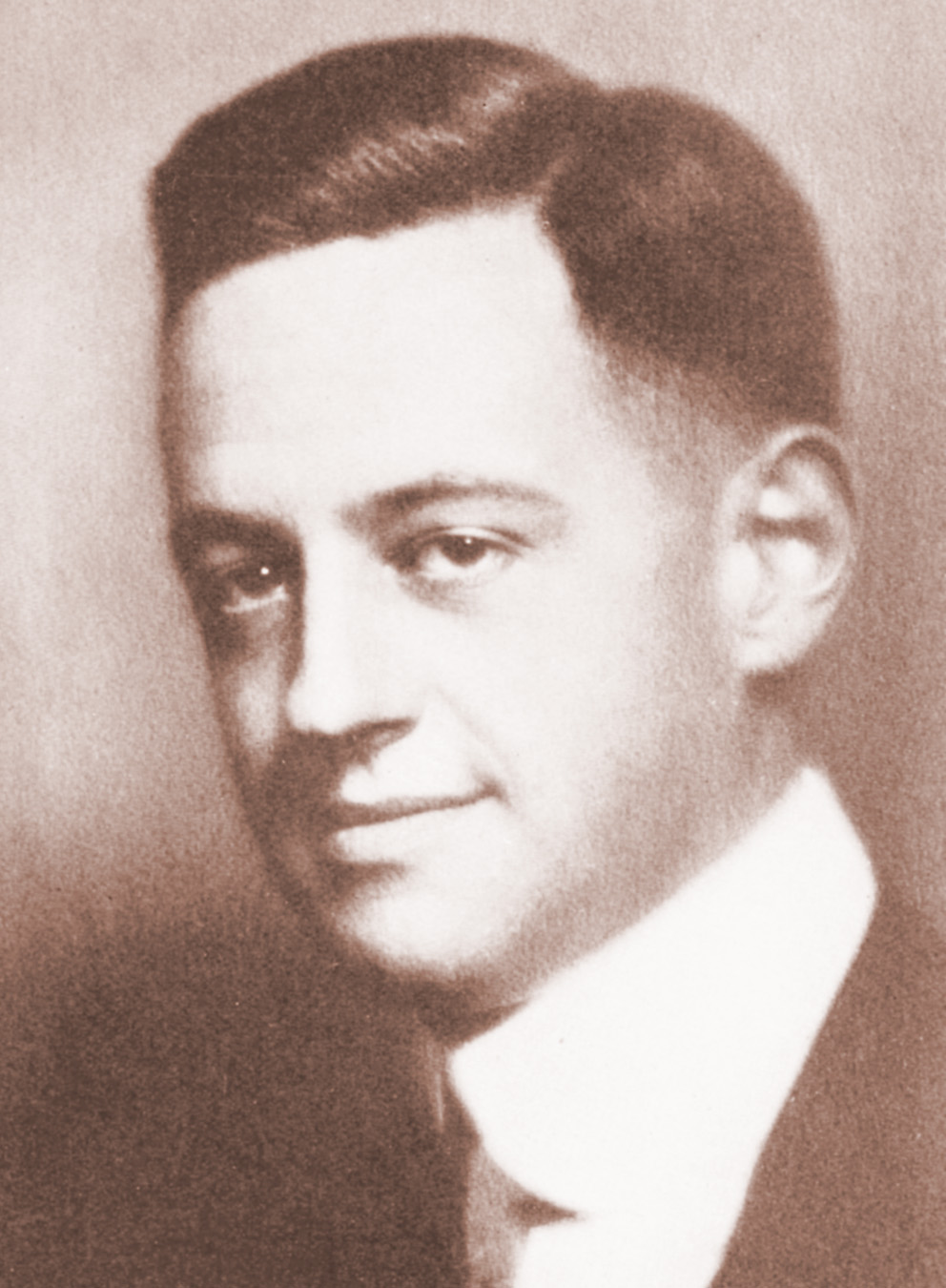
Wood in the 1920s

Eric Fisher Wood Sr. (1888–1962) was an American engineer, Pennsylvania National Guard general, co-founder of the American Legion and designer of its emblem.

== Early years and education ==
Eric Fisher Wood was born in New York City in 1888 to Frances Fisher Wood and Dr. William Benjamin Wood.

As a boy Wood was educated in private schools. He later enrolled at Yale University in New Haven, Connecticut, from which he graduated with degrees in Economics, English, and a PhD degree in civil engineering. Wood did additional post-graduate course work studying architecture at Columbia University in New York City, as well as the École des Beaux-Arts in Paris.

== World War I ==
At the time of the eruption of World War I, Wood was an American in Paris. Wood volunteered his services at the American Embassy in France as an attaché, joining the Embassy staff to help handle the greatly increased workload that was associated with the war. Later Wood would join the American Ambulance Corps, serving in that capacity for a few months. Wood maintained a journal during his time in Europe which he published in book form in 1915 as The Note-book of an Attaché: Seven Months in the War Zone.

Wood subsequently returned to the United States, where he became Vice-President of the National Security League, an organization dedicated to fostering so-called "military preparedness" in the face of the vast and spreading European War. Wood was also involved from a year from 1915 to 1916 as part of the Plattsburgh Training Camp Executive Committee. He found time to publish a second book during this interval dealing with the topic of military preparedness, The Writing on the Wall.

In 1917 Wood returned to Europe, where he served in the British Army with the rank of major. In this capacity he was wounded at Arras on April 9, 1917.

In 1917, as an officer at Camp Sherman, Ohio, he was sent out to raise building funds by Major General Edwin Forbes Glenn, who was responsible for organizing the 83rd Infantry Division. Following American entry into the war in 1917, Wood was commissioned as a major in the U.S. Army on August 14, 1917 and served as assistant chief of staff for the 88th Infantry Division. Wood was wounded again, this time by poison gas during the Meuse-Argonne Offensive that same fall.

By the end of the hostilities in November 1918 Wood had risen to the rank of lieutenant colonel.

== The American Legion ==
On February 15, 1919, Wood was ordered by Gen. John J. Pershing to join with 19 of his fellows in a special committee headed by Theodore Roosevelt Jr. given the task of providing a set of recommendations aimed at curbing the serious problem of declining morale. A series of proposals resulted from the day-long session, including elimination of restrictive regulations, organization of additional athletic events and recreational opportunities, and the expansion of leave time and entertainment programs. Lt. Col. Roosevelt had an additional purpose unbeknownst to Wood, however, and in the evening the group retired to an Allied Officers Club, where the eldest son of the former President unveiled his proposal for a new veterans' society — a group which would ultimately emerge as the American Legion.

A provisional executive committee of four people emerged from the February 15 "Roosevelt dinner", headed by Roosevelt himself, who was to return to the United States and obtain his military discharge when able, and then to gather assistants and promote the idea of the new veterans' organization among demobilized troops there. Roosevelt's close associate in the project George A. White, who was to travel France touring the camps of the AEF explaining the idea in person.

The European center of operations was to be manned by Wood, together with former Ohio Congressman Ralph D. Cole. The pair were to establish a central office and to maintain contact by mail and telegram with the various combat divisions and headquarters staffs, as well as to publicize activities to the press.

Wood also served as the first temporary chairman of the April 1919 Paris Caucus of the American Legion, as well as the Secretary of the two subsequent gatherings which formally established the organization, the St. Louis Caucus and the Minneapolis National Convention.

== Interwar career ==
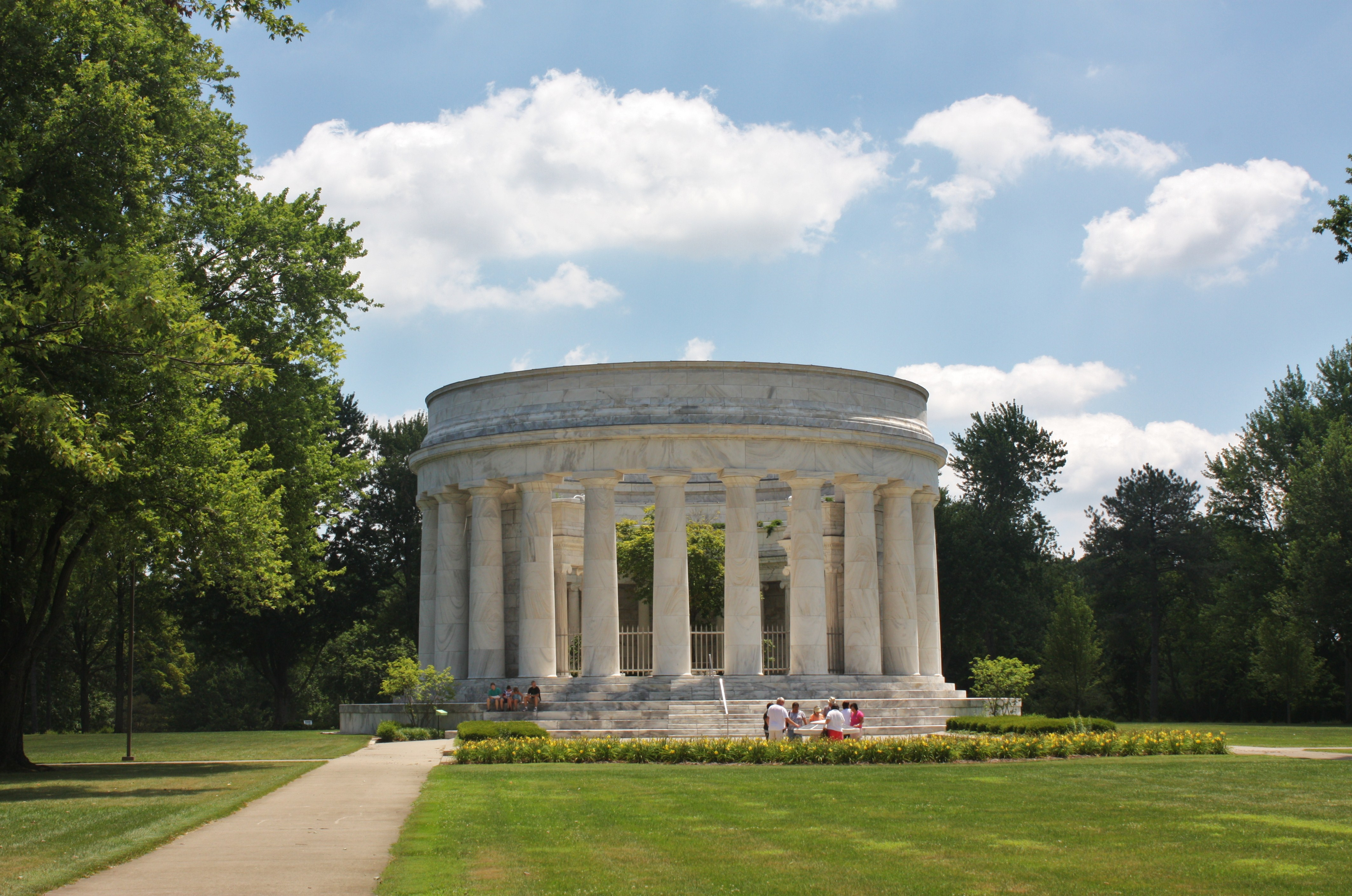
The Warren G. Harding Memorial, better known as the "Harding Tomb", was co-designed by Eric Fisher Wood.

During the 1920s Wood moved to Pittsburgh, Pennsylvania, where he established himself as a prominent architect.

He also continued his military career as commander of the Pennsylvania National Guard.

With the outbreak of World War II, Wood was recalled to active duty. He served for the duration of the war, rising to the rank of brigadier general.

During the course of his military career Wood would earn the Legion of Merit, the Purple Heart with oak leaf, and the Croix de Guerre, in addition to 20 ribbons and 10 battle stars.

== Death and legacy ==
Eric Fisher Wood Sr. died in 1962, preceded in death by his eldest son, Eric Fisher Wood, Jr., who was killed during World War II at the Battle of the Bulge.

His papers, consisting of 8 linear feet of correspondence, manuscripts, diaries, and photographs, are housed at the Special Collections Research Center of Syracuse University Library in Syracuse, New York. A finding aid is available on-line.

Wood's best-known architectural work is the Harding Tomb in the former President's hometown of Marion, Ohio. Wood was co-designer of this massive classical white marble structure.

== Works ==
- The Note-book of an Attaché: Seven Months in the War Zone. New York: Century Co., 1915.
- The Writing on the Wall: The Nation on Trial. New York: Century Co., 1916.
- The Note-Book of an Intelligence Officer. New York: The Century Co., 1917.
- Officers and Executive Committee, List of Members, Constitution: Addresses by Major Eric Fisher Wood, Rt. Hon. Sir George H. Reid, Milton M. Brown, Sir John Foster Fraser, D. Thomas Curtin. Contributor. Cincinnati, Ohio: Commonwealth Club, 1918.
- The Swiss System. New York: National Security League, n.d. [1919]. —Excerpt from The Writing on the Wall.
- Leonard Wood: Conservator of Americanism. New York: George H. Doran, 1920.
- The ROTC Manual: Field Artillery: A Textbook for the Reserve Officers Training Corps: Basic Course. Washington, D.C.: Military Service Publishing Co., 1934.
- Lectures on Troop Leading and Staff Procedure: Spoken Extemporaneously between 8th April and 1st May, 1941, to the 28th Division's Command and General Staff School, which Included All Field Officers and Acting Field Officers of the Division, at Indiantown Gap Military Reservation, Penna. Harrisburg, Pennsylvania: Telegraph Press, 1942.
