= Gumberg Library =

Academic library in Pittsburgh, Pennsylvania, U.S.

Coordinates: 40.4373°N 79.9914°W

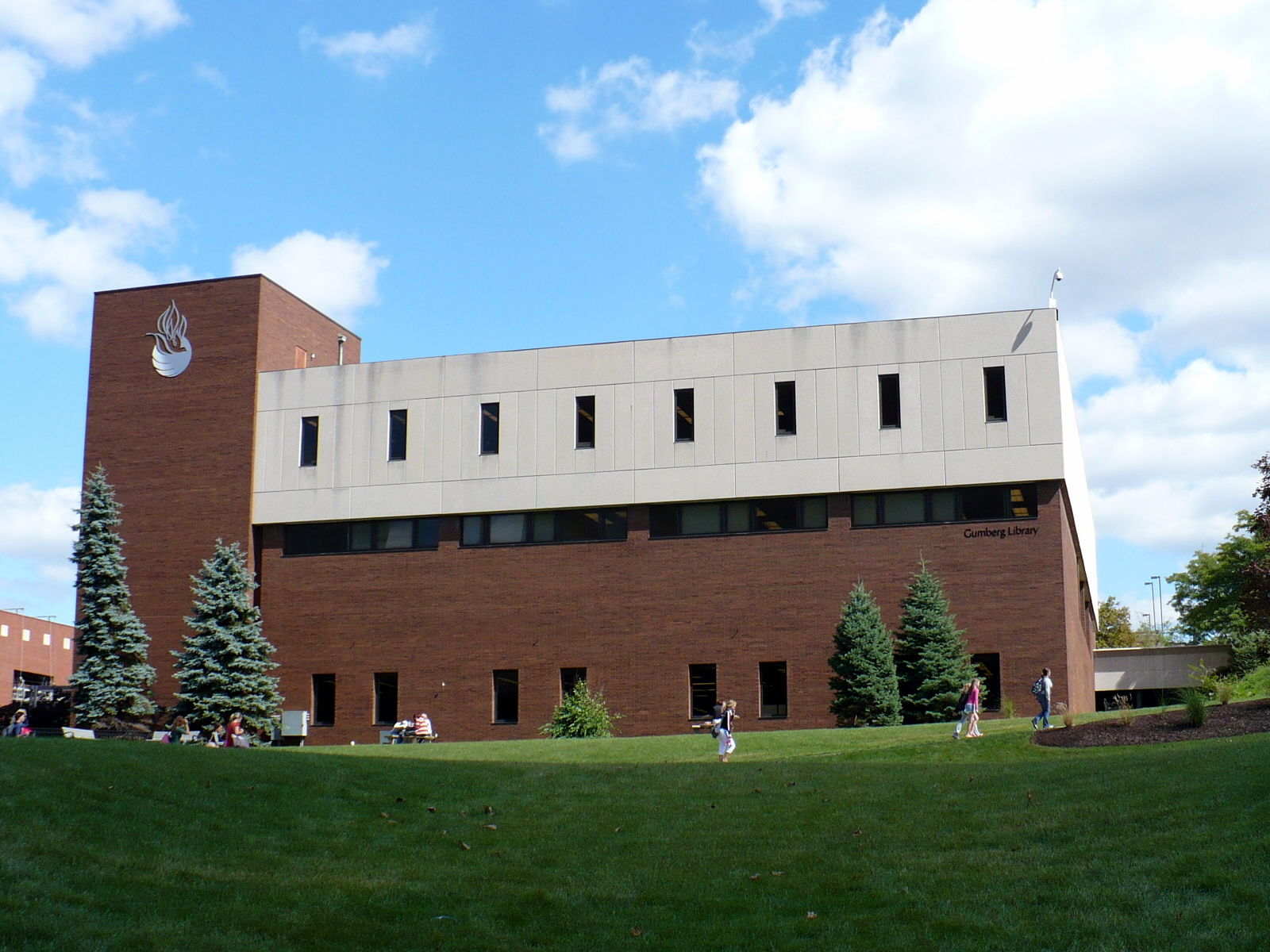
The Gumberg Library, as seen from Brottier Commons at Duquesne University

The Gumberg Library is the main library of Duquesne University in Pittsburgh, Pennsylvania. The five-story building contains the university's principal circulating collections, research services, archives and special collections.

== History ==
Duquesne's library originated with the founding of the Pittsburgh Catholic College of the Holy Ghost in 1878. After the college moved to the Bluff, the library was housed in the university's Old Main building from 1885 until 1927 and subsequently at a building on Vickroy Street.

A dedicated library building was completed in 1939 and enlarged in 1961. It remained the university library until the opening of the present facility in 1978.

The present library was created through the conversion of the Geyer Garage, a structure dating from the early 1920s. Renovation began in 1977, and the library opened during Duquesne's centennial year in 1978. The building was dedicated as the Gumberg Library at Duquesne University on February 3, 1995, in recognition of benefactors Stanley R. Gumberg, a 1950 Duquesne alumnus, and his wife, Marcia.

== Collections and services ==
In 2025, the library reported holdings of 294,037 volumes, 972,447 electronic-book titles, 75,365 print and electronic serial titles, 519 research databases and approximately 191,000 streaming videos. Its institutional repository contained more than 15,000 items. These figures do not include the collections of the Duquesne Center for Legal Information at the Thomas R. Kline School of Law.

The library provides research consultation and instruction, interlibrary-loan services, group and individual study spaces, and access to electronic resources.

=== Research centers and special collections ===
Gumberg Library houses the Duquesne University Archives and Special Collections, the Simon Silverman Phenomenology Center and the Maureen Sullivan Curriculum Center. Its named archival collections include the papers and libraries of Cardinal John Joseph Wright, Rabbi Herman Hailperin and Pennsylvania judge and congressman Michael Musmanno.

In 2026, the library acquired the archives of Creative Nonfiction, a literary journal founded by Lee Gutkind. The collection includes more than 1,000 essays and interviews submitted to or published by the journal.
