= Liberty Bridge (Pittsburgh) =

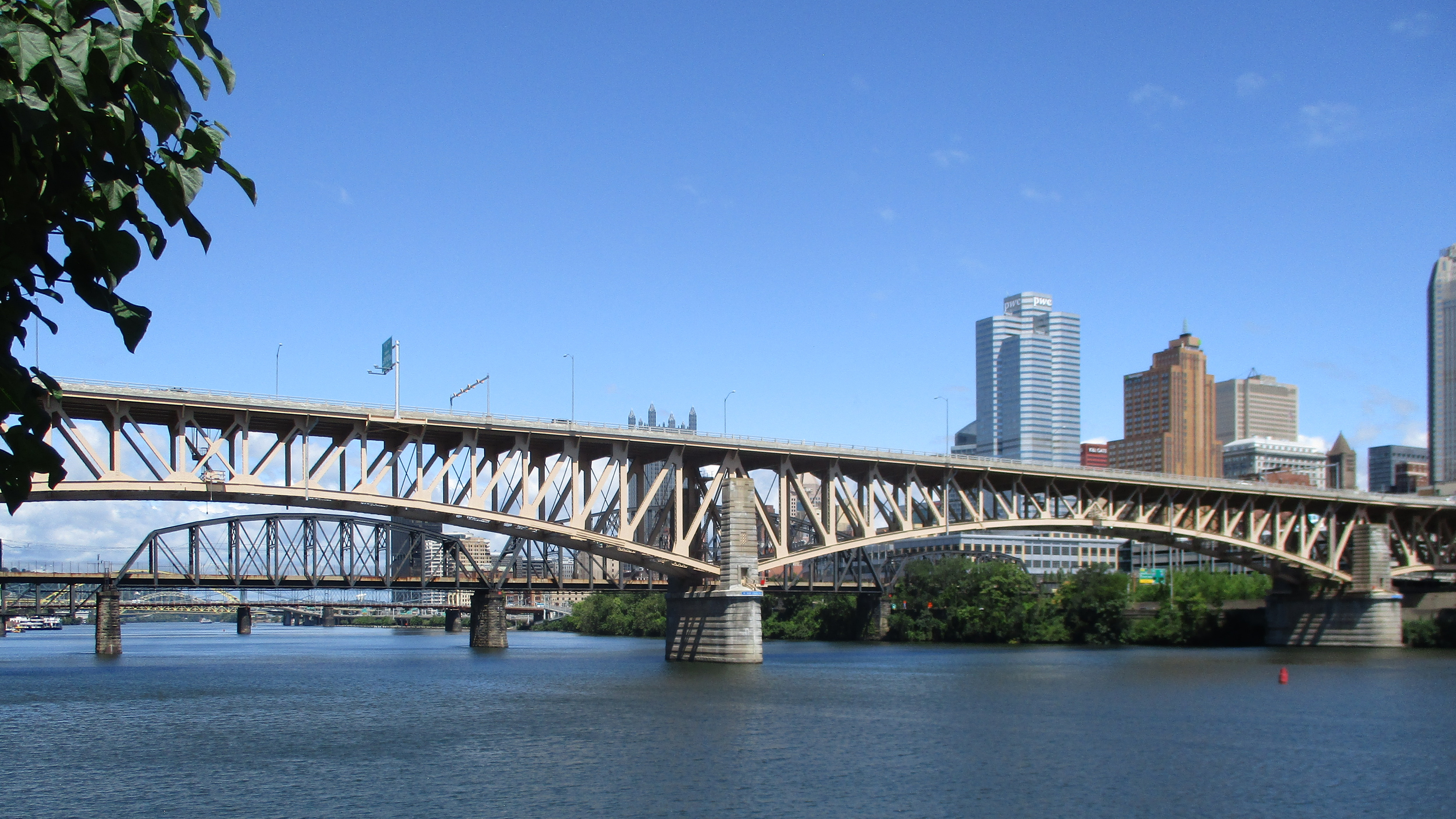
- The bridge in 2023
- Coordinates: 40.4328°N 79.9967°W
- Carries: 4 lanes of roadway
- Crosses: Monongahela River
- Locale: Pittsburgh, Pennsylvania
- Official name: Liberty Bridge
- Other name: South Hills Bridge
- Maintained by: Allegheny County

Characteristics
- Design: Cantilever bridge
- Material: Steel
- Total length: 2,663 feet (812 m)
- Longest span: 2 spans, each 448 feet (137 m)
- Clearance below: 44.4 feet (13.5 m)

History
- Opened: March 27, 1928; 98 years ago

Statistics
- Daily traffic: 63,000

Location
- Interactive map of Liberty Bridge

The Liberty Bridge, which was completed in 1928, connects downtown Pittsburgh, Pennsylvania, to the Liberty Tunnels and the South Hills neighborhoods beyond. It crosses the Monongahela River and intersects Interstate 579 (the Crosstown Boulevard) at its northern terminus.

It was designed by George S. Richardson and cost $3,456,000 to build.

== History ==
The Liberty Bridge is a steel cantilever bridge and was created as the missing link between downtown Pittsburgh and the Liberty Tunnel, which had been built four years earlier in 1924 as a link to the South Hills. The bridge opened on March 27, 1928, following a 5-mile (8.0 km) vehicle parade from the southern suburbs of the city, which crossed the Smithfield Street Bridge and proceeded through downtown before ending at the southern end of the new bridge.

It was designed by George S. Richardson and cost $3,456,000 to build. It is 2,663 feet 3/16 inch (811.687 m) long, the main span is 448 feet (137 m), and the water clearance is 44.4 feet (13.5 m).

It was renovated in 1982 by the Dick Corporation, at a cost of $32 million.

On September 2, 2016, the Liberty Bridge was closed for 24 days, following a fire during construction work on the bridge. Intense heat from burning plastic piping had caused a 30-foot (9 m) steel beam (compression chord) to buckle. The bridge reopened to weight-limited traffic on September 26, and full traffic on September 30. The Pennsylvania Department of Transportation assessed the value of the damages at over $3 million.

== See also ==
- List of bridges documented by the Historic American Engineering Record in Pennsylvania
- List of crossings of the Monongahela River

== Gallery ==
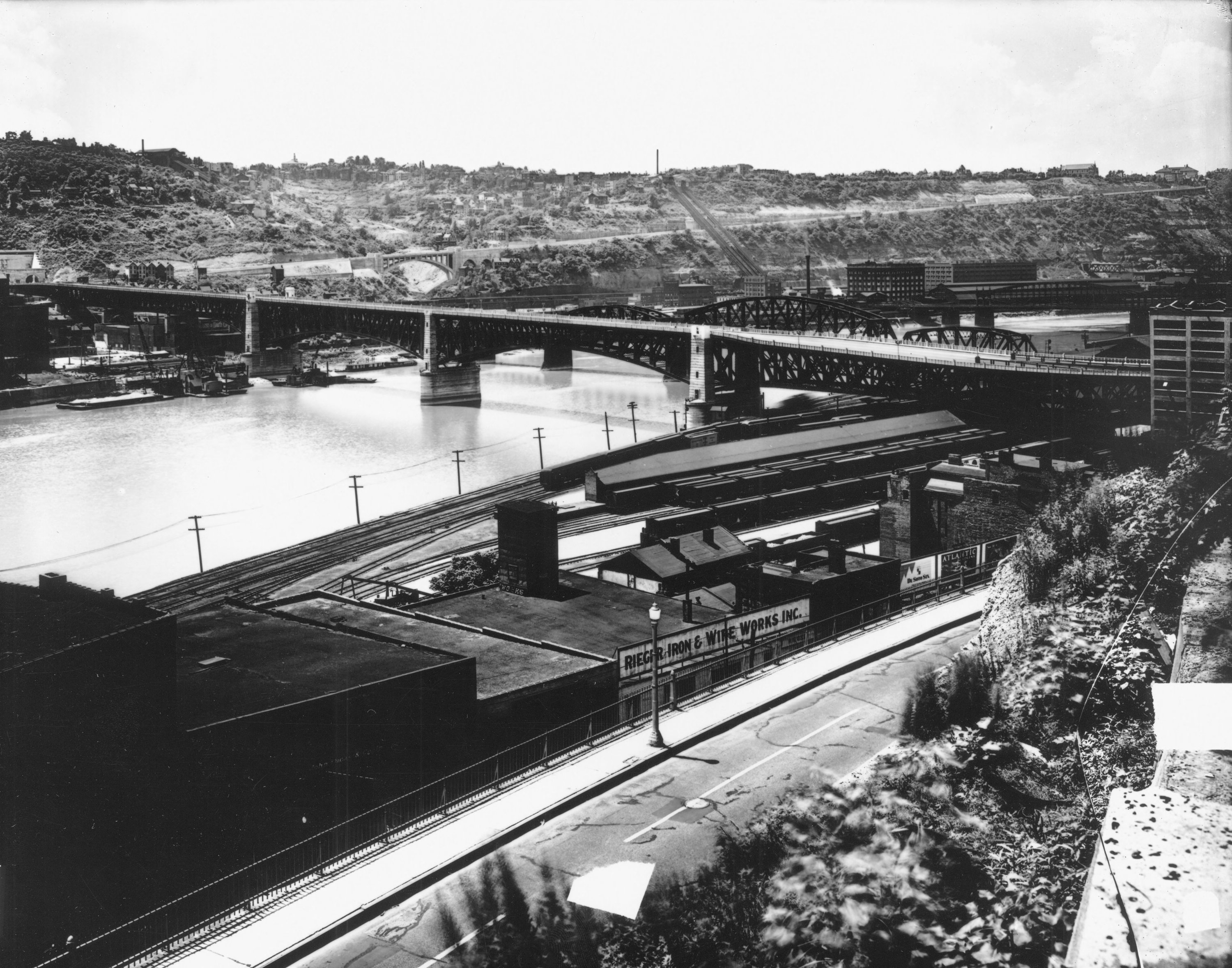
The bridge five months after opening, from Bluff

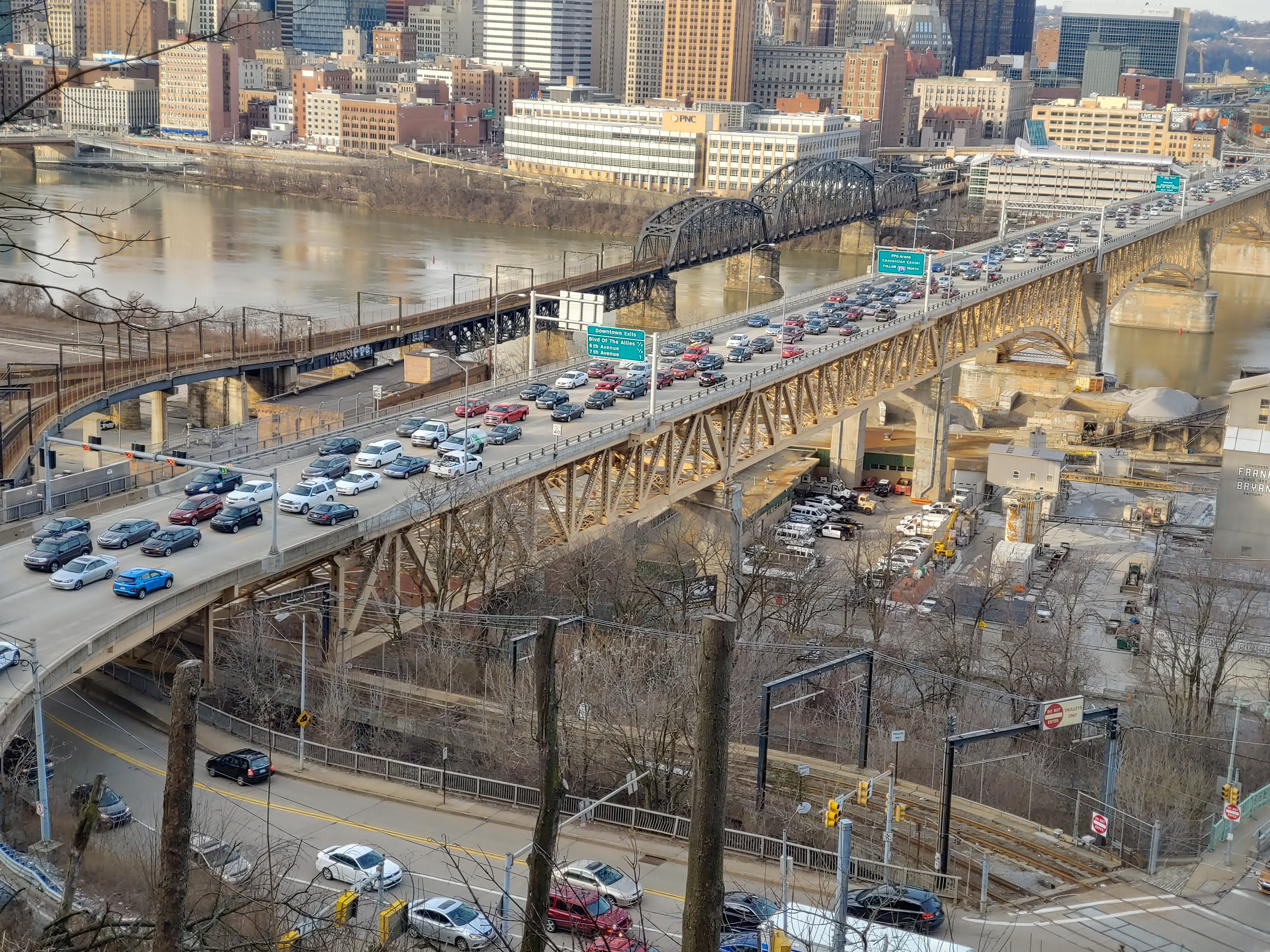
Liberty bridge facing Downtown Pittsburgh

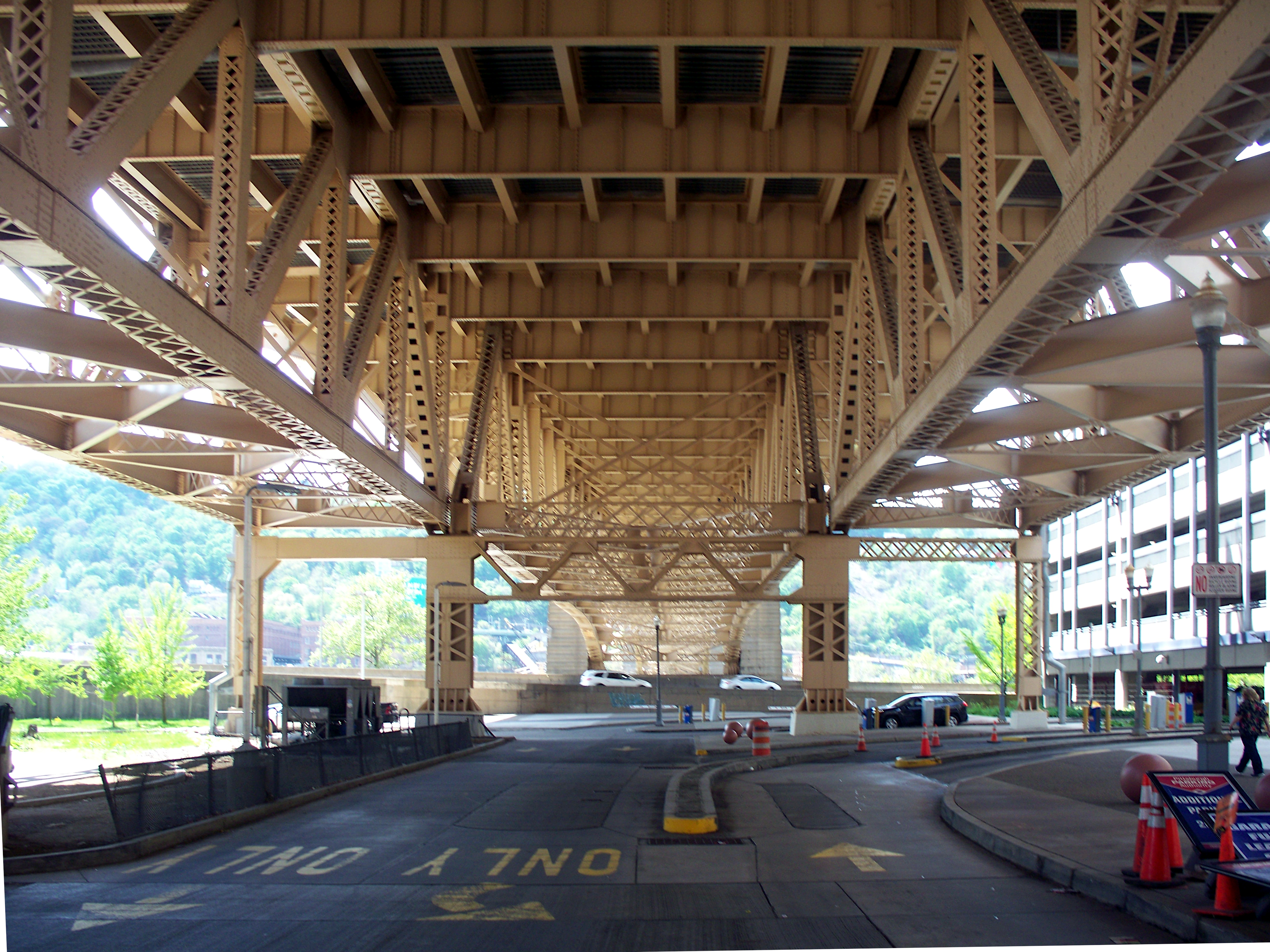
Underside in 2019

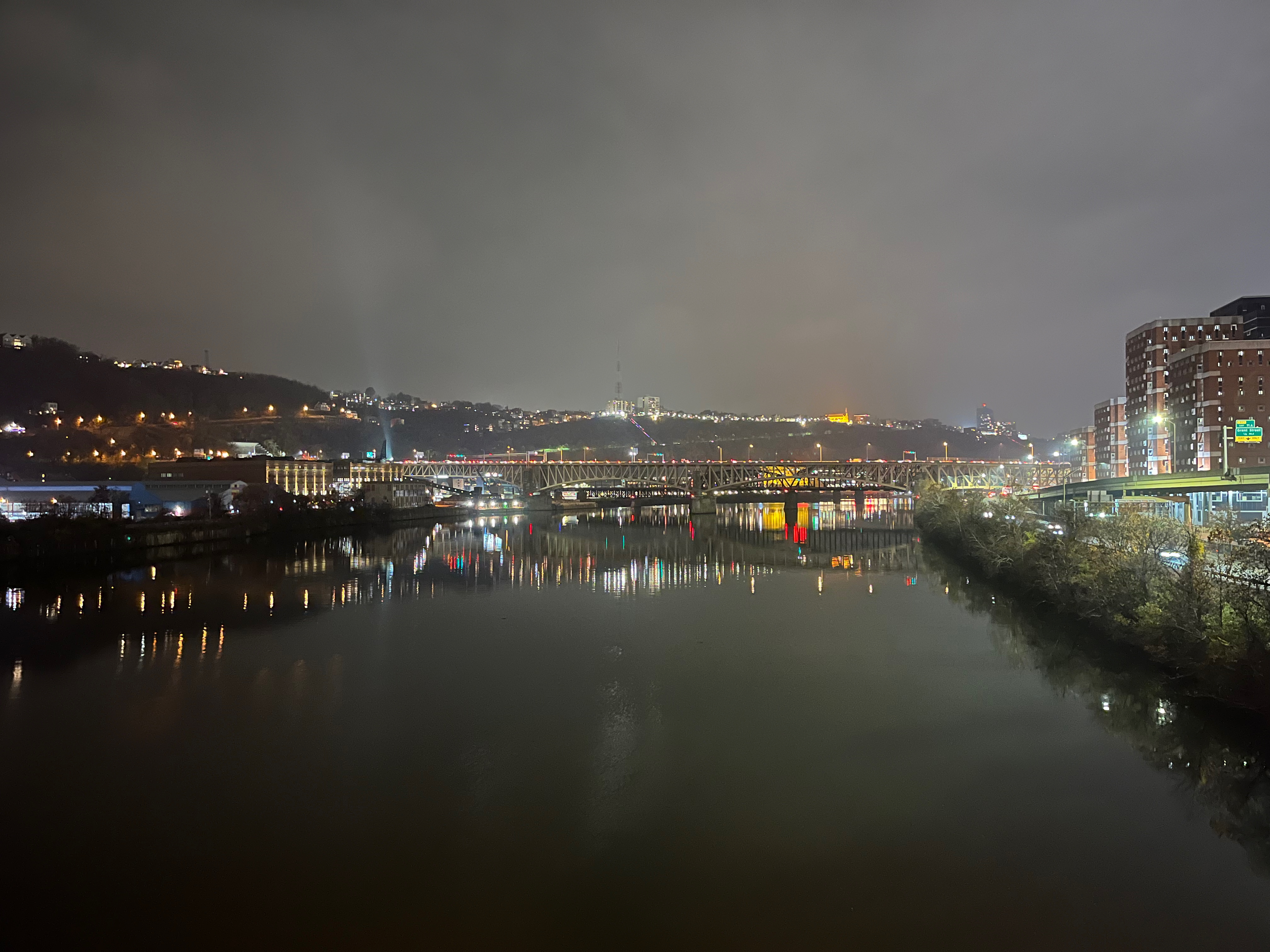
At night in 2025
