= Homestead Grays Bridge =

Bridge over the Monongahela River

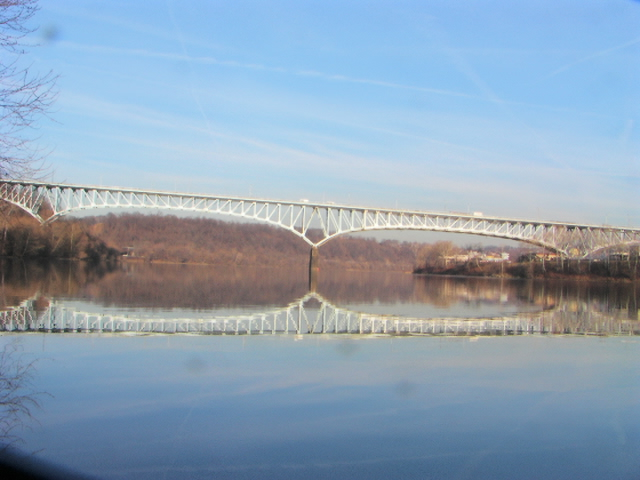
- View of the Homestead Grays Bridge
- Coordinates: 40°24′39″N 79°55′08″W
- Carries: Blue Belt
- Crosses: Monongahela River
- Locale: Allegheny, Pennsylvania, United States
- Official name: Homestead Grays Bridge
- Other name: Pittsburgh-Homestead High Level Bridge
- Named for: Homestead Grays
- Maintained by: Allegheny County
- NBI Number: 027301304723920

Characteristics
- Design: Truss bridge
- Total length: 3,750 ft (1,140 m)
- Height: 49.9 ft (15.2 m)

History
- Built: 1936

Pittsburgh Landmark – PHLF
- Designated: 2001
- Homestead High-Level Bridge
- U.S. National Register of Historic Places
- Location within Pennsylvania
- Location: Monongahela River at West St., Pittsburgh, Pennsylvania
- Area: 5.4 acres (2.2 ha)
- Built: 1934
- Architect: Allegheny County Authority
- Architectural style: Wichert Continuous Truss
- MPS: Allegheny County Owned River Bridges TR
- NRHP reference No.: 86000016
- Added to NRHP: January 7, 1986

Location
- Interactive map of Homestead Grays Bridge

The Homestead Grays Bridge, also known as the (Homestead) High Level Bridge, was built in 1936 and spans the Monongahela River between Homestead Borough and the southernmost tip of Pittsburgh's Squirrel Hill neighborhood. It is notable as the first bridge to incorporate the Wichert Truss, which uses a quadrilateral shape over each support, into its design. This made the truss statically determinate, so that forces in the structural members could be calculated. There are very few surviving Wichert Truss bridges, including one other example in Pittsburgh, the Charles Anderson Memorial Bridge.

== History ==
The bridge was dedicated on Saturday November 20, 1937, having cost the county of Allegheny $2.75 million to build and originally carried four highway lanes and two streetcar tracks of Pittsburgh Railways Company. It replaced the 1897 Brown's Bridge (Homestead and Highland Bridge) which was upstream and had linked Brown's Hill Rd on the north bank and Second Avenue between Ann Street and Amity Street, Homestead on the south bank.

In 1979, the bridge was renovated.

On July 11, 2002, the Homestead High-Level Bridge was renamed the Homestead Grays Bridge in honor of the Homestead Grays baseball team.

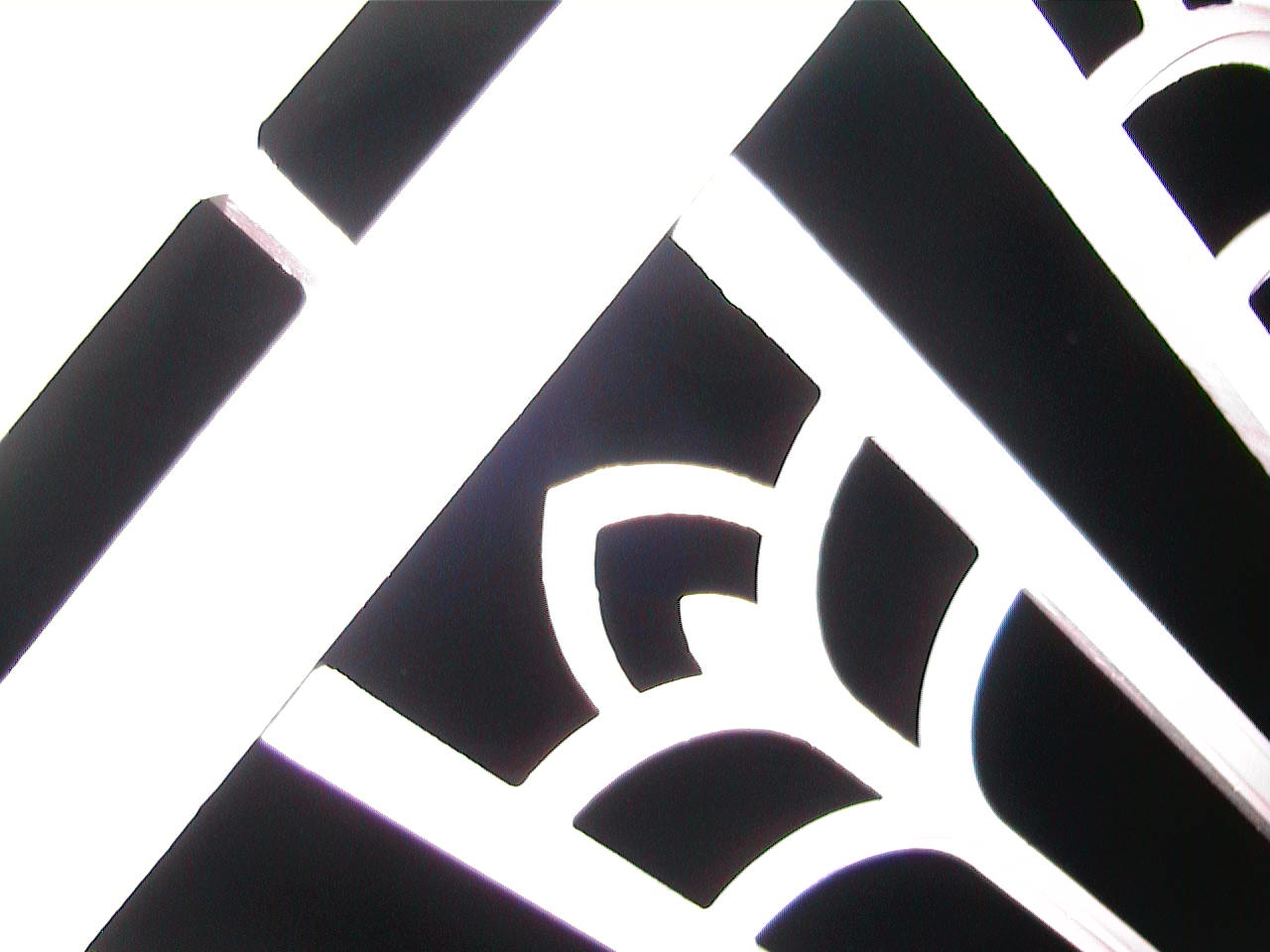
Bridge railing pattern

In 2006 and 2007 work was undertaken to rehabilitate the bridge: the deck was removed and the structure stripped down to the steel, then the steel structure repaired and a new, wider deck put on. The new deck is six feet wider in traffic lanes—three feet on each side—and also has broader pedestrian walkways. The railings and lighting were replaced with reproductions of historic models, and the entire structure received a new coat of blue-grey paint.

== See also ==
- List of crossings of the Monongahela River
