= McKees Rocks Bridge =

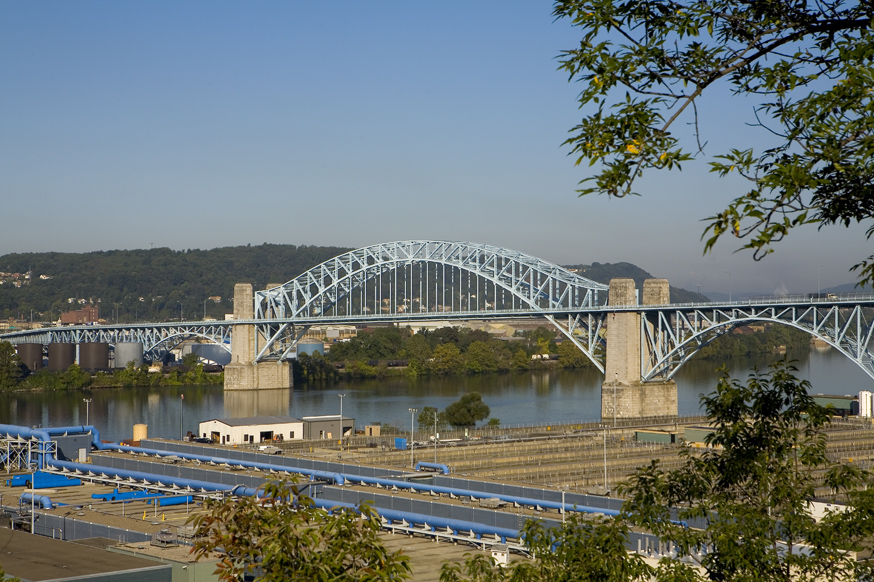
- The bridge in 2006
- Coordinates: 40.47704°N 80.0489°W
- Carries: SR 3104 / Blue Belt; 3 lanes of roadway
- Crosses: Ohio River
- Locale: McKees Rocks, Pennsylvania

Characteristics
- Design: Through arch bridge
- Total length: 7,293 feet (2,223 m)
- Longest span: 750 feet (228.6 m)
- Clearance below: 100 feet (30 m)

History
- Opened: 1931
- McKees Rocks Bridge
- U.S. National Register of Historic Places
- Pittsburgh Landmark – PHLF
- Location within Pennsylvania Location within the United States
- Location: SR 3104 over Ohio River at Brighton Heights and McKees Rocks, Pennsylvania
- Built: 1931
- Architect: Vernon R. Covell
- MPS: Highway Bridges Owned by the Commonwealth of Pennsylvania, Department of Transportation TR
- NRHP reference No.: 88002168

Significant dates
- Added to NRHP: November 14, 1988
- Designated PHLF: 2003

Location
- Interactive map of McKees Rocks Bridge

The McKees Rocks Bridge is a steel trussed through arch bridge which carries the Blue Belt, Pittsburgh's innermost beltline, across the Ohio River at Brighton Heights and McKees Rocks, Pennsylvania. It connects Pennsylvania Route 65 with Pennsylvania Route 51, west of the city.

== History and architectural features ==
At 7,293 feet (2,223 m) long, this historic bridge is the longest bridge in Allegheny County.

Built in 1931, it was listed on the National Register of Historic Places in 1988.

The stretch of the bridge from Island Avenue was the successor to the O'Donovan Bridge, which ran from Island Avenue to the "Bottoms" of McKees Rocks from 1904 to 1931.

== Gallery ==
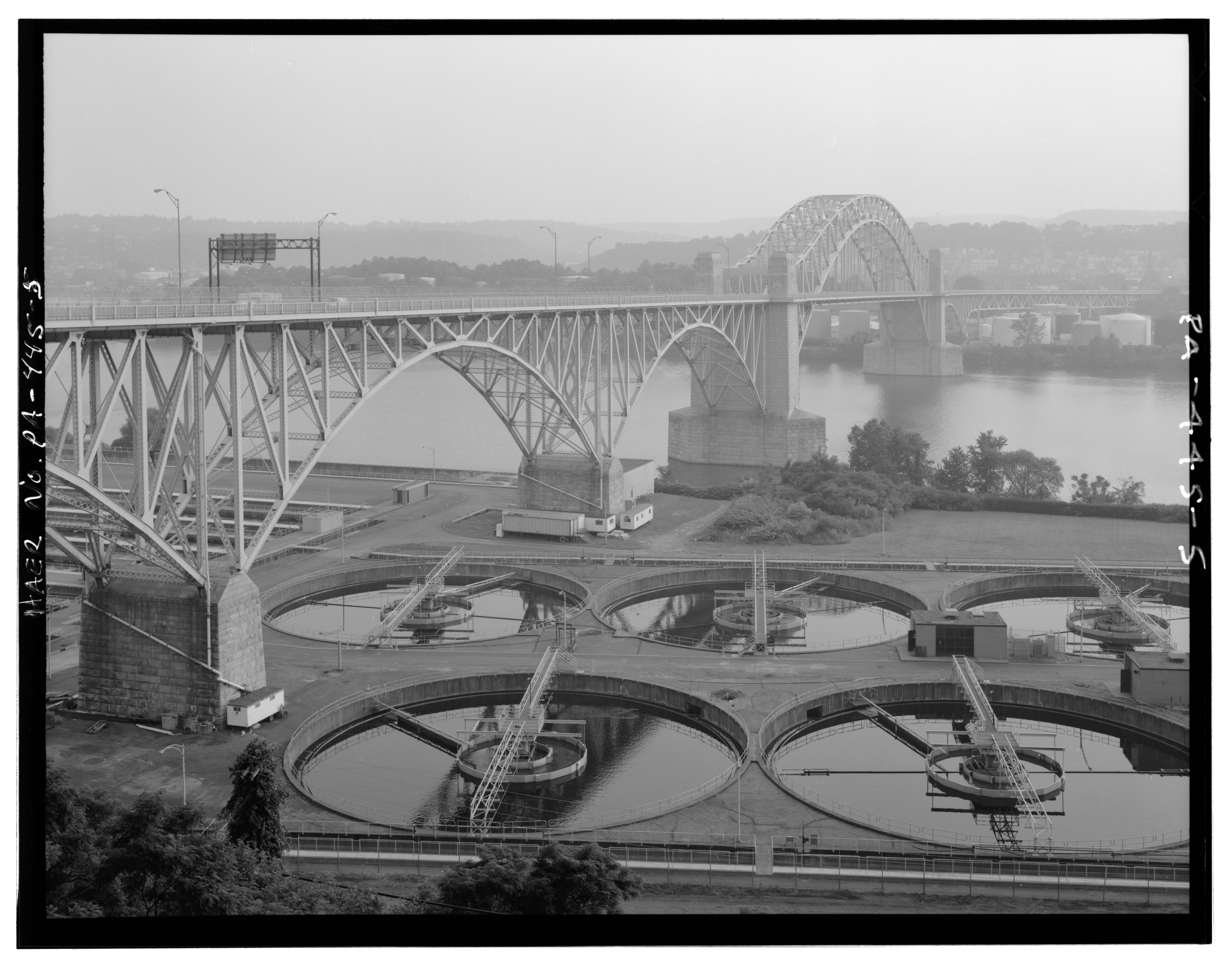
The bridge in 1997

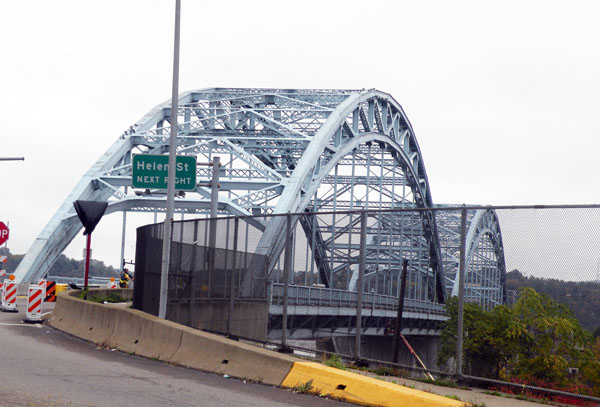
Western span of the bridge over railroad tracks in 2009

== See also ==
- List of bridges documented by the Historic American Engineering Record in Pennsylvania
- List of crossings of the Ohio River
