= List of bridges of Pittsburgh =

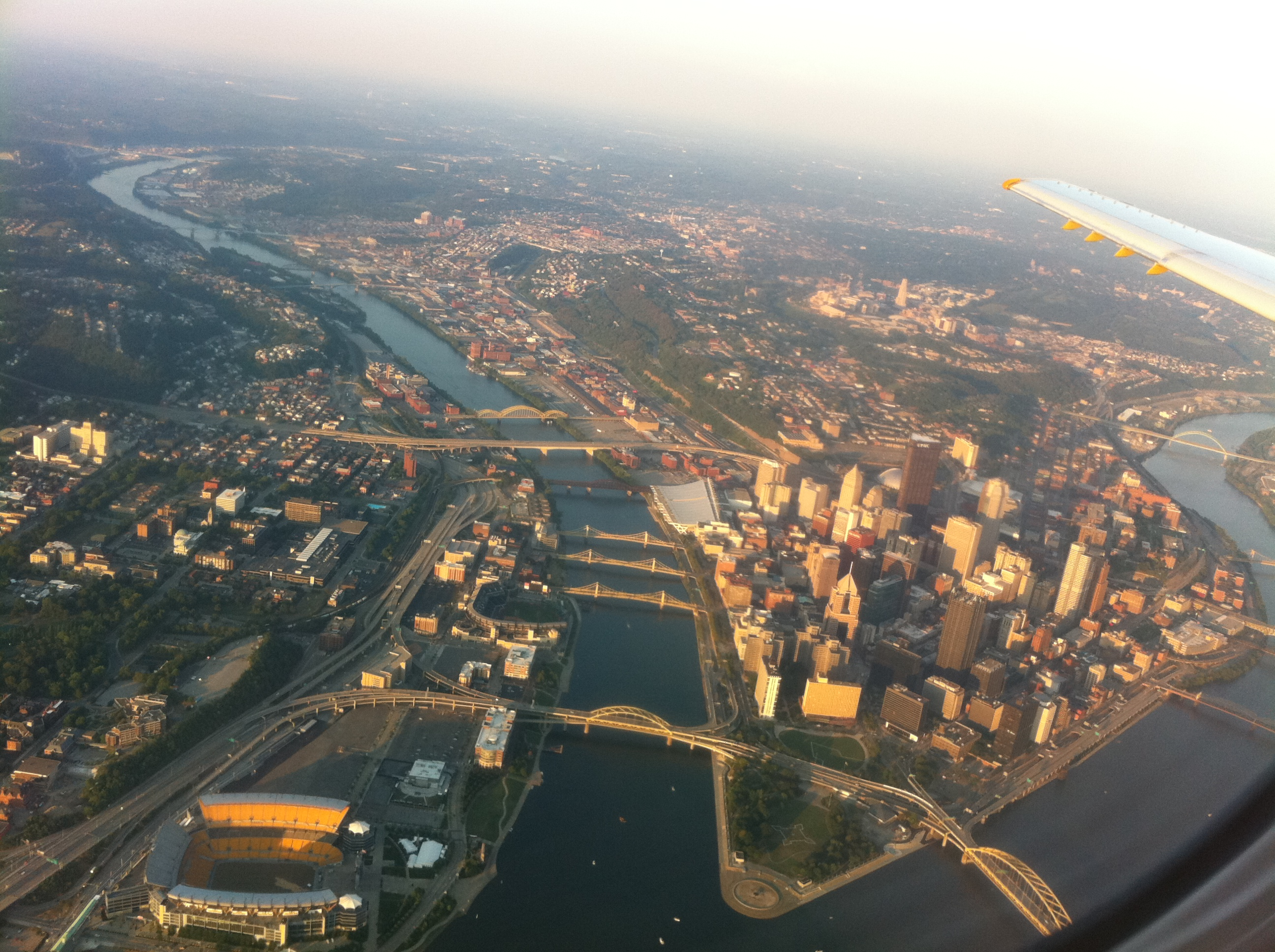
Eighteen of Pittsburgh's large bridges are visible in this aerial photo

The bridges of Pittsburgh play an important role in the city's transportation system. Without bridges, the Pittsburgh region would be a series of fragmented valleys, hillsides, river plains, and isolated communities.

A 2006 study determined that, at the time, Pittsburgh had 446 bridges, though that number has been disputed. With its proximity to three major rivers and countless hills and ravines, Pittsburgh is known as "The City of Bridges".

== History ==
Pittsburgh's first river bridges, made of wood and long since replaced, opened in 1818 at Smithfield Street and 1819 at Sixth Street (then St. Clair Street). The city's oldest in-service bridge is the current Smithfield Street Bridge, which opened in 1883; it was designated a National Historic Landmark in 1976. Pittsburgh waged a massive road and bridge building campaign from 1924 to 1940; most of Pittsburgh's oldest major bridges date from this period. The coming of the Interstate Highway System triggered more construction in the second half of the twentieth century, as vehicular speed and throughput requirements increased. The result of more than 100 years of bridge building is a collection of most of the major types of bridge (suspension, cantilever, arch, etc.), mostly built from locally produced steel, including about forty river spans.

Many of the bridges in the Downtown area are colored Aztec Gold, either constructed as such or painted afterward, to match the city's official colors of black and gold. A few old and out-of-service bridges, such as the Hot Metal Bridge (which stood dormant until reopening as a passenger bridge in the year 2000), are exceptions to this rule.

== Degrading bridge conditions ==
According to a 2011 study by Transportation for America, 1,194 bridges in the Pittsburgh area—or 30.4%—were deficient, the highest proportion in the nation.

On February 8, 2008, the Birmingham Bridge suffered a failure of its rocker bearings, causing the deck to drop eight inches, prompting a closure of the bridge. The bridge was repaired and fully reopened on September 8, 2008.

On January 28, 2022, the Fern Hollow Bridge across Frick Park collapsed, forcing the closure of Forbes Avenue through the park. The bridge was covered with snow when it collapsed at 6:39 a.m. local time as it was being crossed by several cars and a bus. The bridge was rebuilt and reopened on December 22, 2022.

== Major bridges ==
This table lists all bridges crossing the Allegheny, Monongahela and Ohio rivers in the City of Pittsburgh limits. Other large or notable bridges are also included.

=== Monongahela River ===
Crossing	Carries	Image	Coordinates
Fort Pitt Bridge	I-376 / US 19 Truck / US 22 / US 30		40°26′20″N 80°00′40″W
Smithfield Street Bridge	Smithfield Street		40°26′06″N 80°00′07″W
Panhandle Bridge	Pittsburgh Regional Transit T Light Rail Line		40°25′59″N 79°59′53″W
Liberty Bridge	Connects Liberty Tunnel to Downtown Pittsburgh		40°25′58″N 79°59′48″W
South Tenth Street Bridge	South Tenth Street		40°25′57″N 79°59′21″W
Birmingham Bridge	Connects Fifth and Forbes avenues to East Carson Street		40°26′00″N 79°58′25″W
Hot Metal Bridge	Great Allegheny Passage/Three Rivers Heritage Trail, Hot Metal Street		
Glenwood Bridge	PA 885		
Glenwood B&O Railroad Bridge	Allegheny Valley Railroad		
Homestead Grays Bridge (Homestead High Level Bridge)	Blue Belt		

=== Allegheny River ===
Crossing	Carries	Image	Coordinates
Fort Duquesne Bridge	I-279 / US 19 Truck		40.4443°N 80.0093°W
Roberto Clemente Bridge	6th Street		40.4456°N 80.0033°W
Andy Warhol Bridge	7th Street		40°26′46″N 80°00′05″W
Rachel Carson Bridge	9th Street		40.4467°N 79.9998°W
Fort Wayne Railroad Bridge	Allegheny Valley Railroad, Capitol Limited (Amtrak train), Norfolk Southern Railway Fort Wayne Line		40.4482°N 79.9962°W
Veterans Bridge	Interstate 579		40.4499°N 79.9934°W
David McCullough Bridge	16th Street		40.4517°N 79.9909°W
Herr's Island Railroad Bridge (West Penn Bridge) (rails removed, crosses back channel only)	Three Rivers Heritage Trail		
30th Street Bridge (crosses back channel only)	30th Street		
William Raymond Prom Memorial Bridge / 31st Street Bridge	31st Street		40.4630°N 79.9758°W
33rd Street Railroad Bridge	33rd Street / Allegheny Valley Railroad P&W Subdivision		40.4657°N 79.9736°W
Washington Crossing Bridge / 40th Street Bridge	40th Street		40.4728°N 79.9686°W
Senator Robert D. Fleming Bridge / 62nd Street Bridge	PA Route 8 / 62nd Street Bridge		40.4912°N 79.9381°W
Highland Park Bridge	Blue Belt / Highland Park Bridge		40.4891°N 79.9120°W
Brilliant Branch Railroad Bridge	Allegheny Valley Railroad Brilliant Branch / Brilliant Branch Railroad Bridge		40.4866°N 79.9053°W

=== Ohio River ===
Crossing	Carries	Image	Coordinates
McKees Rocks Bridge	SR 3104 / Blue Belt		40°28′38″N 80°02′54″W
Ohio Connecting Railroad Bridge	Norfolk Southern Railway Fort Wayne Line		40°27′46″N 80°02′35″W
West End Bridge	U.S. Route 19		

=== Other bridges ===
This table lists some other major bridges within the City of Pittsburgh limits.

Bridge	Carries	Over	Image
Bloomfield Bridge	Liberty Avenue Bloomfleld Bridge - Pittsburgh	P&W Subdivision, East Busway, Pittsburgh Line	
Brilliant Cutoff Viaduct	Brilliant Branch	Silver Lake Drive	
Charles Anderson Memorial Bridge	Boulevard of the Allies	Junction Hollow, P&W Subdivision, Three Rivers Heritage Trail	
Commercial Street Bridge	I-376 / US 22 / US 30	Nine Mile Run, Commercial Street	
Fern Hollow Bridge	Forbes Avenue	Fern Hollow Creek, Fern Hollow	
Forbes Avenue Bridge	Forbes Avenue	Junction Hollow, P&W Subdivision	
Frazier Street Bridge	I-376 / US 22 / US 30	Junction Hollow, P&W Subdivision, Swinburne Bridge	
Greenfield Bridge (2017)	Greenfield Road / Beechwood Boulevard	Four Mile Run, I-376	
Larimer Avenue Bridge	Larimer Avenue	PA 8 (Washington Boulevard)	
Lincoln Avenue Bridge	Lincoln Avenue	PA 8 (Washington Boulevard)	
Meadow Street Bridge	Meadow Street	Negley Run Boulevard	
Murray Avenue Bridge	Murray Avenue	Beechwood Boulevard	
Palm Garden Trestle	South Busway, Red Line, Blue Line, Silver Line	Saw Mill Run, Pennsylvania Route 51, Pittsburgh Subdivision, U.S. Route 19 Truck	
Panther Hollow Bridge	Panther Hollow Road	Panther Hollow, Panther Hollow Run	
Schenley Bridge	Schenley Drive	Junction Hollow, P&W Subdivision	
Swinburne Bridge	Frazier Street	P&W Subdivision, Four Mile Run	
Swindell Bridge	North Charles Street / Essen Street	Interstate 279, East Street	

== See also ==
- List of tunnels in Pittsburgh
- Crossings of the Ohio River in Pennsylvania
- Crossings of the Allegheny River in Pennsylvania
- Crossings of the Monongahela River in Pennsylvania
