= Whitehall Tunnel =

- Interactive map of Whitehall Tunnel

Overview
- Location: Baldwin, Allegheny County, Pennsylvania
- Coordinates: 40°20′26″N 79°58′26″W
- Status: in use
- System: Allegheny Valley Railroad
- Start: Old Clairton Road
- End: Macassar Drive

Operation
- Work began: 1899
- Constructed: rock bored, brick ring lining
- Opened: 1900
- Owner: Allegheny Valley Railroad
- Operator: Allegheny Valley Railroad

Technical
- Length: 1,630 ft (500 m)
- No. of tracks: Single (formerly Double)
- Track gauge: 1,435 mm (4 ft 8 1/2 in) standard gauge
- Operating speed: 15 MPH
- Tunnel clearance: 23 ft (7.0 m)

The Whitehall Tunnel in Allegheny County, Pennsylvania was originally built by the B&O Railroad in 1899 as a double-track tunnel. The tunnel was completed in 1900. It was part of the Baltimore and Ohio Short Line Railroad, and allowed the B&O to bypass its former route into Pittsburgh along the Pittsburgh Southern and Little Saw Mill Run Railroad. One worker, Antonio De Bono, was killed during its construction.

It is currently a single-track tunnel, owned by the Allegheny Valley Railroad. The tunnel is approached from Glenwood in the south, up a steep grade along the Streets Run valley to the northern end of the tunnel. The line continues from the southern end to Bruceton, Pennsylvania.

Dimensions: 28 ft wide (8.5 m) at base; 30 ft wide (9.1 m) at spring line; 23 ft (7.0 m) from top of rail to top of arch rise

Engineer: W. T. Manning; Bennet & Talbot, subcontractor, 1901–02
