= List of tunnels in Pittsburgh =

The following is a list of tunnels in Pittsburgh:

== Tunnels ==
Tunnel	Image	Carries	Under	Coordinates	Notes
Armstrong Tunnel			Bluff	40°26'17"N, 79°59'35"W	
Cork Run Tunnel		West Busway, Pittsburgh, Cincinnati, Chicago and St. Louis Railroad	Sheraden	40°26'56.0"N, 80°3'44.3"W	Also known as the Berry Street Tunnel
Corliss Tunnel			West Busway, Mon Line	40°27'7.6"N, 80°2'26.9"W	
Fort Pitt Tunnel		I-376 / US 19 Truck / US 22 / US 30	Mount Washington	40°25'54.8"N, 80°1'27.8"W	
J&L Tunnel		Pittsburgh Subdivision	SouthSide Works	40°25'49"N, 79°57'49"W	
Liberty Tunnel			Mount Washington	40°25'44.8"N, 79°59'57.8"W	
Mount Washington Transit Tunnel		South Busway, Red Line, Blue Line, Silver Line	Mount Washington	40°25'53.8"N, 80°0'15.8"W	
North Shore Connector tunnel		Red Line, Blue Line, Silver Line	Allegheny River	40°26'41.6"N, 80°0'22.7"W	
Pittsburgh & Steubenville Extension Railroad Tunnel		Red Line, Blue Line, Silver Line		40°26'28.00"N, 79°59'47.65"W	Also known as the Panhandle Tunnel
Pennsylvania Canal Tunnel		Pennsylvania Canal (Western Division)		40°26'29.0"N, 79°59'40.9"W	Sometimes confused with the Pittsburgh and Steubenville Extension Railroad tunnel, which is nearby
Pittsburgh and Castle Shannon Tunnel		Pittsburgh and Castle Shannon Railroad	Mount Washington	40°25'41.20"N, 80°0'18.61"W	Also known as Mount Washington Coal Tunnel. Sometimes confused with the Mount Washington Transit Tunnel, which follows a similar alignment at a lower elevation of Mount Washington.
Schenley Tunnel		P&W Subdivision		40°26'46.72"N, 79°56'50.53"W	
Squirrel Hill Tunnel		I-376 / US 22 / US 30	Squirrel Hill	40°25'40.8"N, 79°55'34.7"W	
Wabash Tunnel			Mount Washington	40°25'35.8"N, 80°1'1.9"W	

== See also ==
- List of bridges of Pittsburgh
