= Schenley Tunnel =

Railway tunnel in Pittsburgh, Pennsylvania, United States

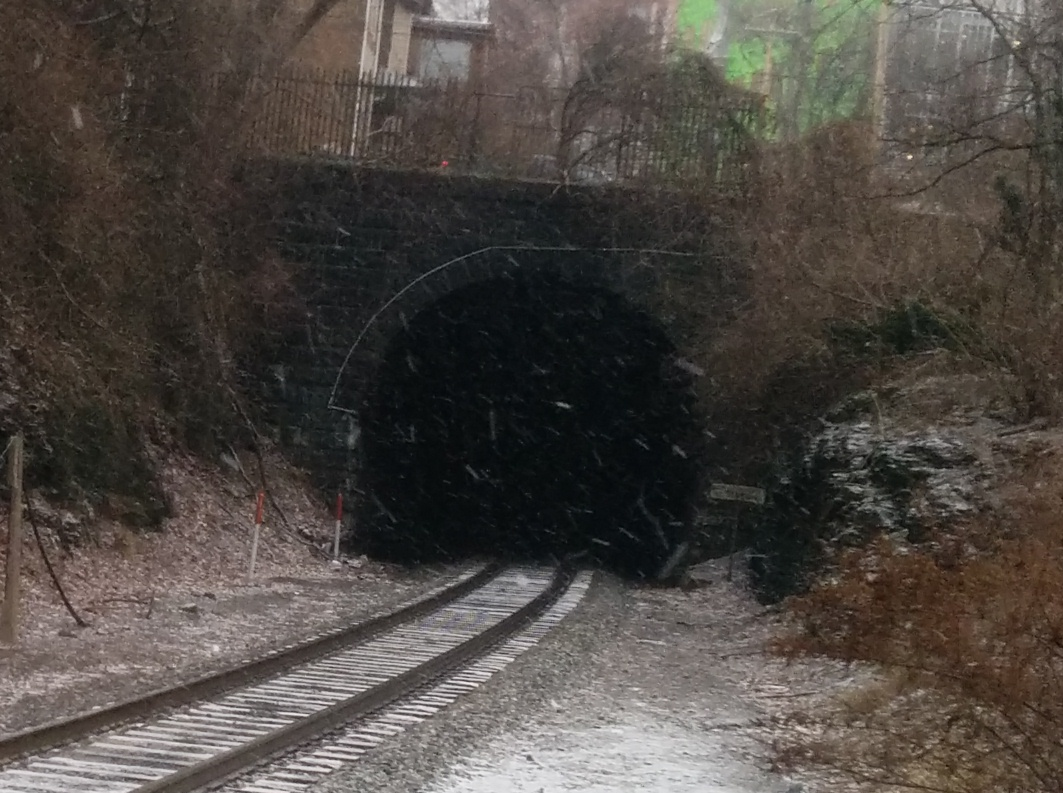
- The south portal in 2016.
- Interactive map of Schenley Tunnel

Overview
- Other names: Neville Street Tunnel; Pittsburgh Junction Railroad Tunnel
- Line: P&W Subdivision
- Location: Beneath Neville Street in the Oakland and Shadyside neighborhoods
- Coordinates: 40.44631°N 79.94737°W

Operation
- Constructed: May 1883 – December 1884
- Opened: September 1884

Technical
- Length: 2,872.4 ft (875.5 m)
- No. of tracks: 1 (originally 2)
- Track gauge: 4 ft 8 1/2 in (1,435 mm) standard gauge

Schenley Tunnel (also known as the Neville Street Tunnel and Pittsburgh Junction Railroad Tunnel) is a railroad tunnel in Pittsburgh, Pennsylvania, United States. The tunnel runs beneath Neville Street in the city's North Oakland neighborhood; the south portal is at the upper end of Junction Hollow emerging from under Filmore St., the north emerges from under Centre Ave. into a ravine that opens into Skunk Hollow, between North Oakland and Bloomfield.

Schenley Tunnel measures 2,872 feet (875 m) in length and runs about 70 feet (21 m) beneath Neville Street. It carries CSX Transportation's P&W Subdivision. The Allegheny Valley Railroad, a short-line railroad, uses the tunnel for regional services. Amtrak's Floridian also uses the tunnel when entering and leaving the city.

== History ==
Excavation on the tunnel began about May 1883 and continued for nine months. By August 1883, a vertical shaft reached the tunnel's midpoint, and additional excavation began from the inside, working in both directions. In May 1884, brick masons were hired to build the arched passage lining the tunnel. The track was completed on September 24, 1884 and the Pittsburgh Daily Post reported that an informal opening for involved business leaders was held September 30, 1884, but noted that about 25 feet (7.6 m) of the tunnel remained to be bricked. The official opening was delayed until December 1884, when the Junction Railroad's bridge across the Allegheny River and Herr's Island was opened, completing the connecting railroad.

Shaw, Stearns & Norris, railroad builders from Columbus, Ohio were the contractors. The entire Junction Railroad, about four miles (6.4 km) long, including the tunnel and a bridge crossing the Allegheny River at 33rd Street, cost about $1.9 million (equivalent to $68 million in 2025). While the original Schenley tunnel is still in use, the bridge was replaced in 1920.

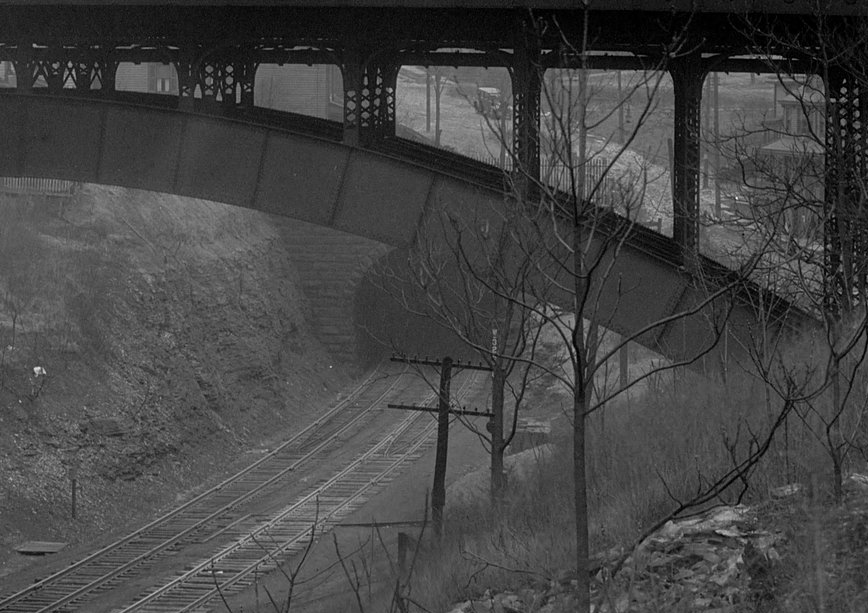
The south portal in 1914.
