= Brilliant Branch Railroad Bridge =

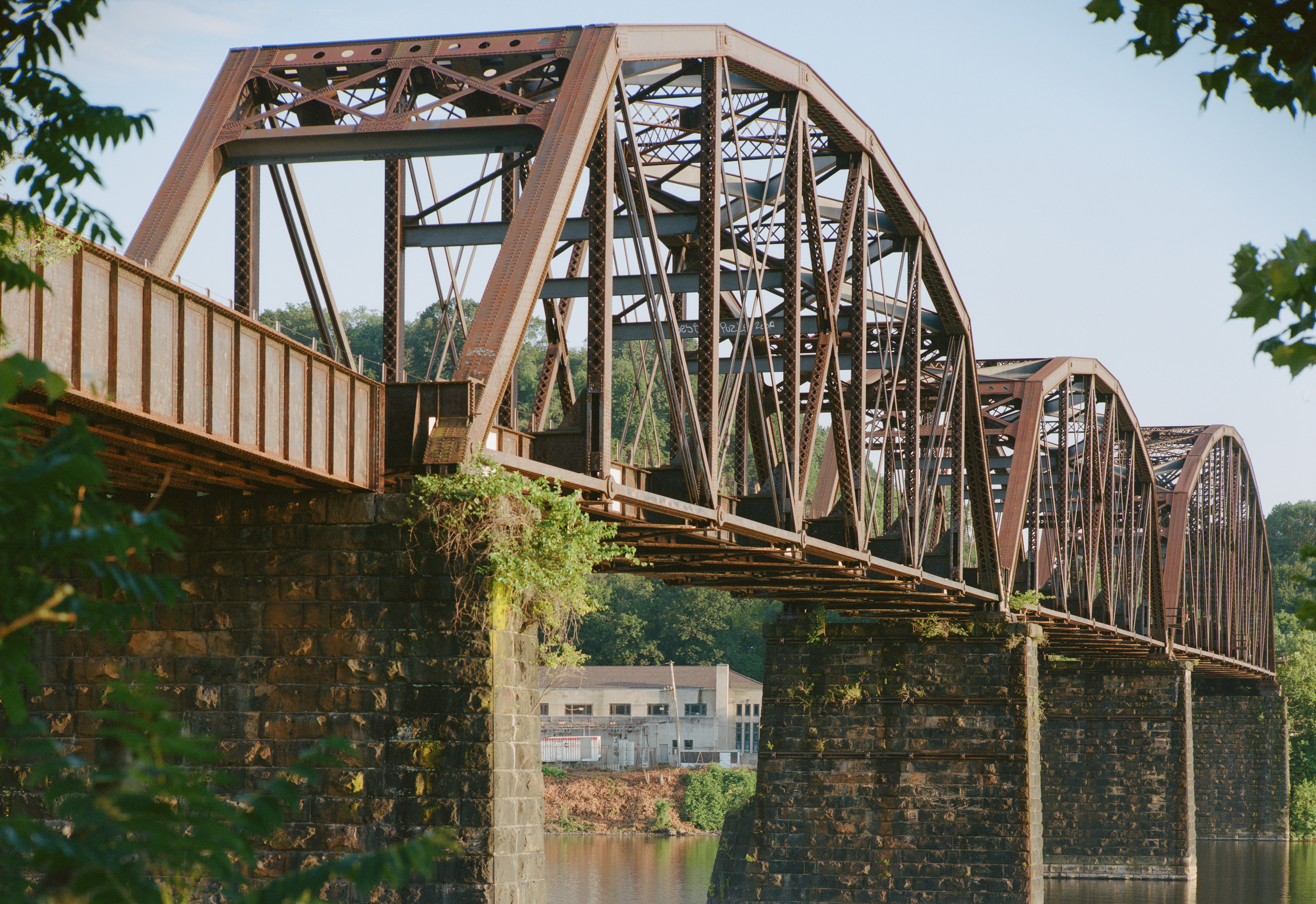
- Coordinates: 40.4866°N 79.9053°W
- Carries: Brilliant Branch
- Crosses: Allegheny River
- Locale: Pittsburgh and Aspinwall

Characteristics
- Design: Truss bridge
- Longest span: 396 feet (121 m)
- Clearance below: 56.5 feet (17.2 m)

History
- Opened: 1904

Location
- Interactive map of Brilliant Branch Railroad Bridge

The Brilliant Branch Railroad Bridge is a truss bridge that carries Allegheny Valley Railroad's Brilliant Branch across the Allegheny River between the Pittsburgh neighborhood of Highland Park and the borough of Aspinwall, Pennsylvania.

== History ==
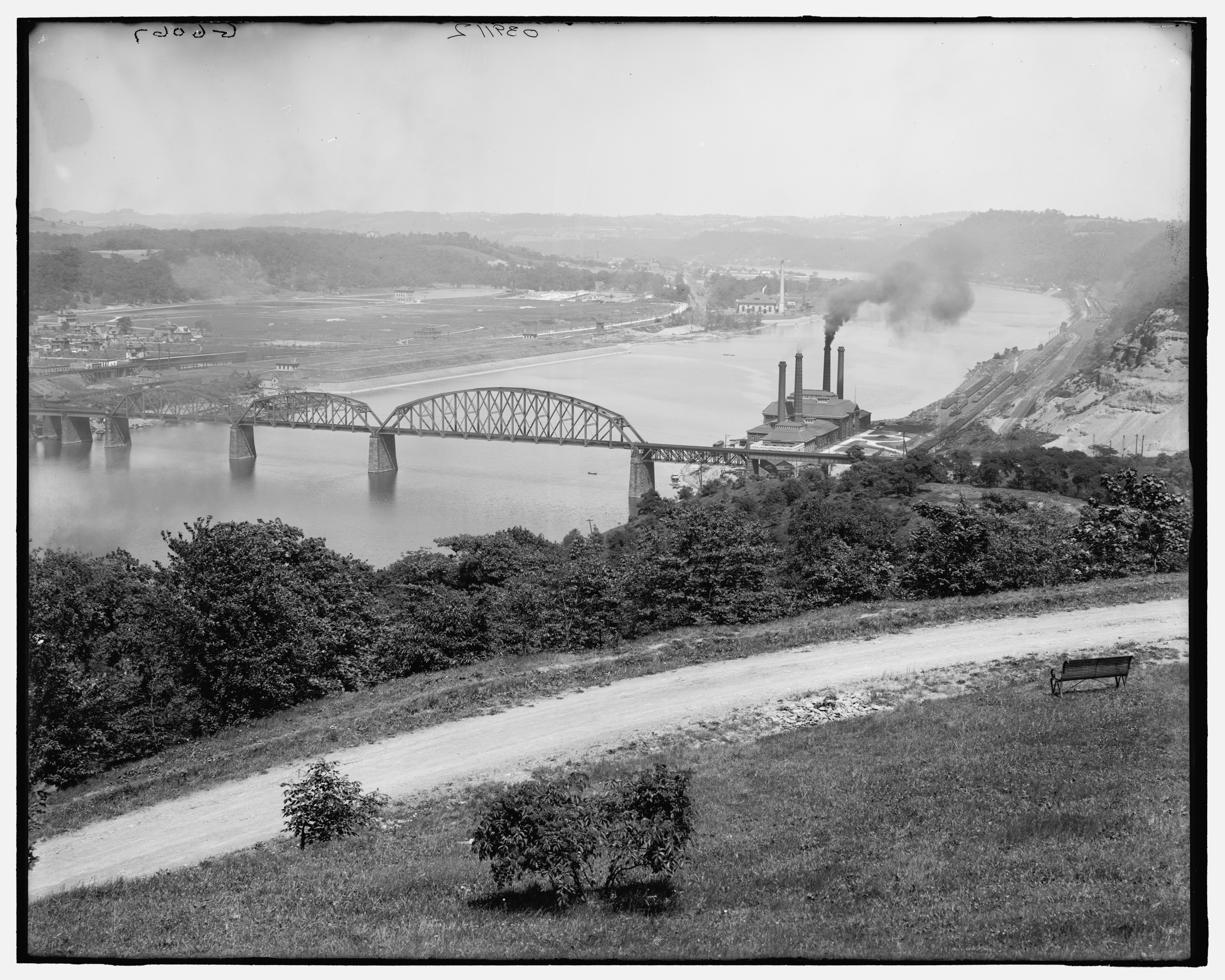
The bridge is seen in this photograph from the early 20th century.

The Brilliant Branch, along with the Port Perry Branch along the Monongahela River was built by the Pennsylvania Railroad as part of a bypass of the narrow tracks around Downtown Pittsburgh. After the collapse of the Penn Central Transportation Company (the PRR's successor company) in 1976, the Brilliant Branch was abandoned. In 1995, they were purchased by the fledgling Allegheny Valley Railroad and in 2003, the Brilliant Branch Bridge was reopened. It generally served one train per day in each direction.

== See also ==
- List of crossings of the Allegheny River
- Bridges of Pittsburgh
- Brilliant Cutoff Viaduct of the Pennsylvania Railroad
