= W&P Subdivision =

Railway line in Pennsylvania

Overview
- Status: Operational
- Locale: southwestern Pennsylvania
- Termini: Glenwood Junction, Pittsburgh; Washington, Pennsylvania

Service
- Type: Freight rail
- Operator(s): Allegheny Valley Railroad

Technical
- Number of tracks: 1
- Track gauge: 1,435 mm (4 ft 8 1/2 in)

The W&P Subdivision is a rail line between Washington, Pennsylvania (formerly ran until Wheeling, West Virginia), and Hazelwood, Pittsburgh, Pennsylvania. Formerly operated by the Baltimore & Ohio Railroad and later CSX Transportation, this line is now operated by Allegheny Valley Railroad. The Allegheny Valley Railroad leased the line from CSX in 2003 and acquired it in 2019. The section from Pittsburgh to Washington, PA is still in use, however, Washington to Wheeling, WV has been abandoned since 1989.

== See also ==
- Glenwood B&O Railroad Bridge
- Whitehall Tunnel
- Baltimore and Ohio Short Line Railroad
- Hempfield Railroad
- P&W Subdivision
