= Brilliant Branch =

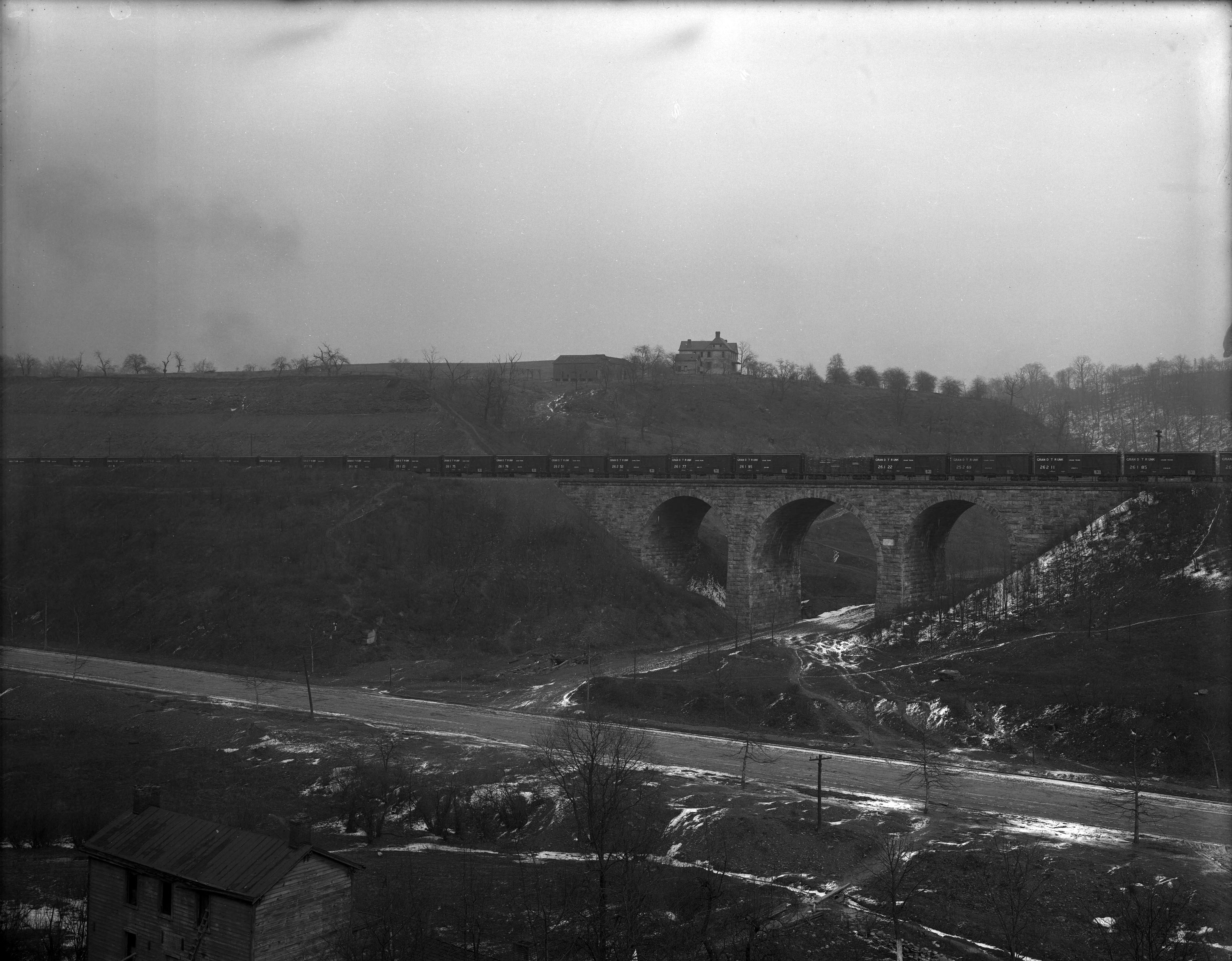
- Freight cars can be seen on the Brilliant Branch in this 1913 photograph

Overview
- Termini: Pittsburgh Line at Homewood; Conemaugh Line at Aspinwall

History
- Opened: November 27, 1904
- Closed: 2024

Technical
- Track gauge: 1,435 mm (4 ft 8 1/2 in) standard gauge

The Brilliant Branch, also known as the Brilliant Cutoff, was a railway line in Pittsburgh and Aspinwall, Pennsylvania. It was opened by the Pennsylvania Railroad in 1904 and abandoned in 2024. It connected the Pittsburgh Line to the Conemaugh Line and to Allegheny Valley Railroad's Allegheny Subdivision. There are plans to convert it into a rail trail.

== History ==
The Pennsylvania Railroad built the Brilliant Branch as a cutoff to avoid the busy Union Station and its yards. The northern end was on the north side of the Allegheny River in Aspinwall, Pennsylvania, where it connected with the line of the Western Pennsylvania Railroad. It then crossed the Allegheny and connected with the main line of the Allegheny Valley Railroad. Finally, it continued south to connect with the main Pittsburgh–Harrisburg line of the Pennsylvania Railroad. The line was built with four tracks at a cost of $3.6 million. It opened on November 27, 1904.

The Pennsylvania Railroad and New York Central Railroad merged in 1968 to create the Penn Central Transportation Company. The Penn Central entered bankruptcy in 1970, and the Brilliant Branch was conveyed to Conrail in 1976. Conrail activated Centralized Traffic Control (CTC) on 150 miles (240 km) of lines in western Pennsylvania in 1978, including the branch.

Conrail sold the branch to the Allegheny Valley Railroad in 1995, aside from the southernmost wye section. The segment south of the Brilliant Branch Railroad Bridge was used as AVRR's main link from the Pittsburgh Line to its Allegheny Subdivision along the south shore of the Allegheny River.

The Brilliant Branch Bridge was subsequently repaired and was used by AVRR to access the AZCON scrap yard on the north side of the river. In 2003, a segment of the P&W Subdivision was leased by AVRR and became their main link between the Pittsburgh Line and the Allegheny Subdivision, leaving the Brilliant Branch to be used for local traffic only.

In 2015, the AZCON scrap yard, the last remaining customer on the line, closed.

In 2016, the line was used as a detour from AVRR's usual route over the P&W Subdivision between the Allegheny Subdivision and the Pittsburgh Line while a trestle on that route was repaired. The line was to be used as a detour again during another phase of the trestle repair in 2019.

== Rail trail ==
The Allegheny Valley Railroad abandoned the line in 2024 and sold it to the Redevelopment Authority of Allegheny County in 2025. The county plans to turn the former right-of-way into a rail trail.

== See also ==
- Brilliant Cutoff Viaduct
- Brilliant Branch Railroad Bridge
