= Abraham Lewis =

Abraham Lewis may refer to:

- Abraham Kirkpatrick Lewis (1815–1860), pioneer coal miner in Pittsburgh, Pennsylvania
- Abraham Lincoln Lewis (1865–1947), American businessman
