= Baltimore and Ohio Short Line Railroad =

Overview
- Locale: Allegheny County, Pennsylvania
- Dates of operation: 1883–
- Predecessor: Pittsburgh Southern Railway
- Successor: Wheeling, Pittsburgh and Baltimore Railroad

Technical
- Track gauge: 4 ft 8 1/2 in (1,435 mm) standard gauge
- Previous gauge: 3 ft (914 mm) gauge
- Length: 34 miles

The Baltimore and Ohio Short Line Railroad was the successor to the Pittsburgh Southern Railway, and a subsidiary of the B&O Railroad, and was organized as a legal entity 25 February 1885. The railroad was a link in the attempt of the B&O to serve the Pittsburgh market, and became part of the Wheeling Division of that railroad. It was constructed by gauge conversion of the former 3 ft (914 mm) narrow gauge railway to 4 ft 8 1/2 in (1,435 mm) standard gauge and the building of the Whitehall Tunnel. It ran from Glenwood Junction to Washington, Pennsylvania, a distance of 34 miles.

== See also ==
- Hempfield Railroad
