= Herr's Island Railroad Bridge =

Bridge in Pittsburgh, United States

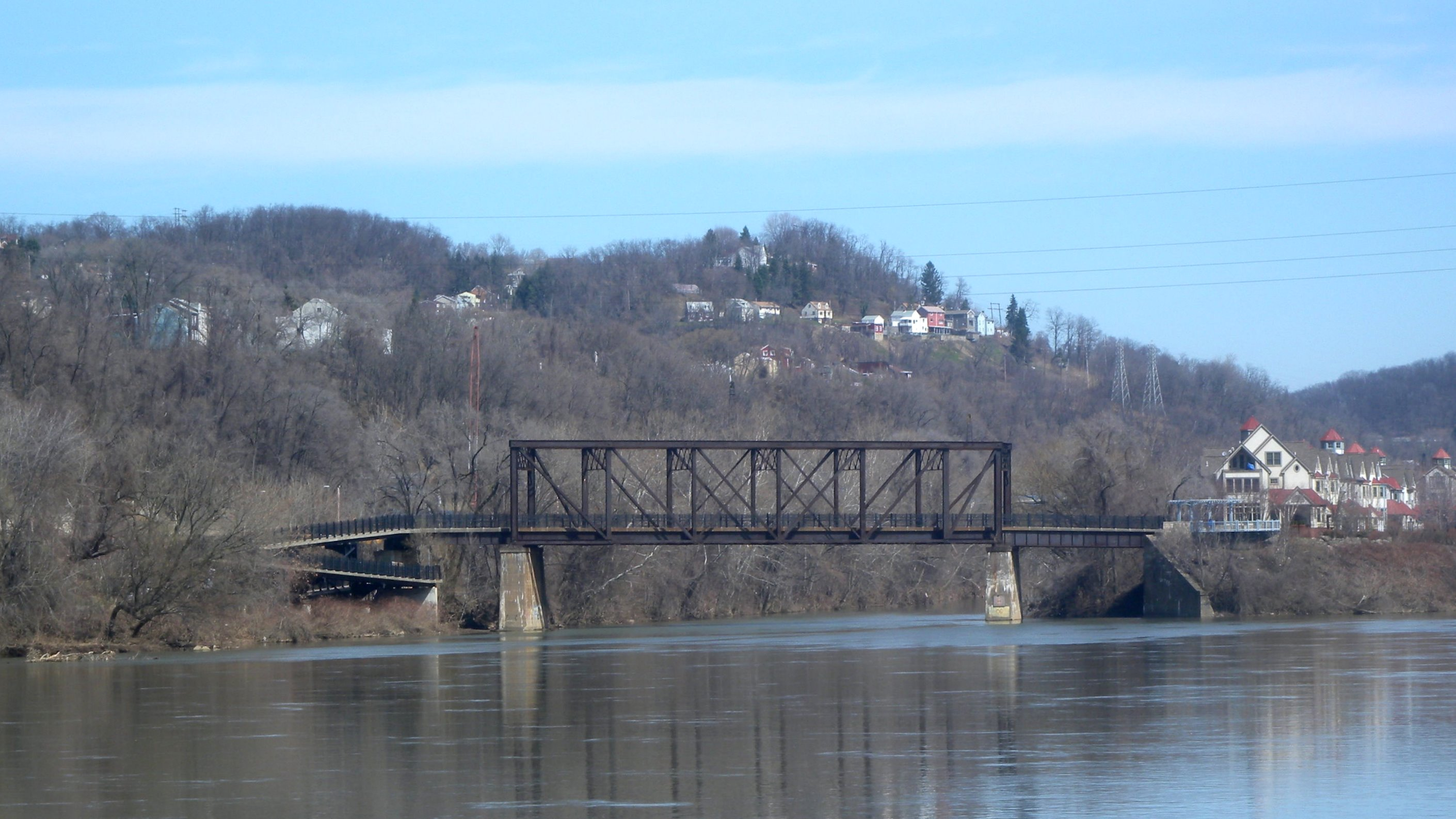
- Coordinates: 40.4603°N 79.9817°W
- Carries: Three River Heritage Bike Trail
- Crosses: Allegheny River
- Locale: Pittsburgh (Troy Hill to Herr's Island)
- Other name(s): West Penn Railroad Bridge; South Railroad Bridge
- Maintained by: Urban Redevelopment Authority of Pittsburgh (URA)

Characteristics
- Design: Whipple Truss bridge
- Longest span: 64 feet (20 m)
- Clearance below: 30 feet (9.1 m)

History
- Opened: 1890 (rebuilt 1903)

The Herr's Island Railroad Bridge, also known as the West Penn Railroad Bridge, is a truss bridge across the Allegheny River in the United States between the Pittsburgh neighborhoods of Troy Hill and Herrs Island (commonly referred to as Washington's Landing).

== History ==
The bridge was built in 1890 by the Western Pennsylvania Railroad (West Penn) to gain access to Herr's Island. It left the main line on the mainland by means of a curving red brick viaduct and three plate girder spans over River Avenue and the B&O before crossing the back channel on a Whipple truss to reach the stockyards and warehouses on the island. In 1903, the West Penn was purchased by the Pennsylvania Railroad, becoming the Western Penn branch. The bridge was strengthened and raised later in the same year to match the raised land level on the island.

Between 1970 and 1990, the brick viaduct and three plate girder spans were removed. In 1999, about a decade after the redevelopment of the island with condominiums and a business park, the bridge was re-decked and reopened as part of the Three Rivers Heritage Trail.

== See also ==
- List of bridges documented by the Historic American Engineering Record in Pennsylvania
- List of crossings of the Allegheny River

== Gallery ==
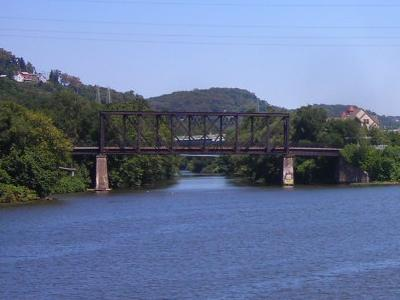
