= Hempfield Railroad =

Overview
- Locale: West Virginia and Pennsylvania
- Dates of operation: 1857–
- Successor: W&P Subdivision

Technical
- Track gauge: 1,435 mm (4 ft 8 1/2 in)

The Hempfield Railroad was chartered May 15, 1850 and was a line that originally was to run from Wheeling, West Virginia to Greensburg, Pennsylvania for a distance of 76 miles.

== History ==
The railroad reached Washington, Pennsylvania in the year 1857. It opened for business in 1857 under the heading of Wheeling, Pittsburgh and Baltimore Railroad. The railroad was a Standard gauge railroad (4 ft 8 1/2 inches) and track was 60 pounds to the yard

In the 1868–1869 years the railroad was operating from Wheeling W. Va. to Washington, PA for a distance of 32 miles. It had 3 locomotives, 6 passenger and freight cars including 11 coal cars for a total of 17 cars. Offices were located Washington, Washington County, Pennsylvania.

Operations to October 31, 1867 were as follows; Gross: $52,198.00 Expenses: $53,357.00 For a loss of $1,159.00

Capital stock: $1,809,565 6 per cent bonds: $500,000 floating debt: $100,000 Cost to build the road: $1,657,799 All of the above reference

The company was bought by the B&O Railroad on March 30, 1871 for $131,000. The company was reorganized as the Wheeling, Pittsburg, and Baltimore on May 3, 1871 by the B&O. It was originally to connect with the Pittsburg and Connellsville Railroad (another B&O company) at West Newton, Pennsylvania after the reorganization.

== See also ==
- Baltimore and Ohio Short Line Railroad
