= Bruce and Clairton Railroad =

Overview
- Dates of operation: 1901–1902
- Successor: West Side Belt Railroad

Technical
- Track gauge: 4 ft 8 1/2 in (1,435 mm) standard gauge

Bruce and Clairton Railroad was a railroad in Pennsylvania, running from Bruce, Pennsylvania to Clairton, Pennsylvania on the Monongahela River. In 1902, it merged with the West Side Belt Railroad, before it had finished its construction.
