= Bloomfield Bridge =

Bridge in Pittsburgh, Pennsylvania, US

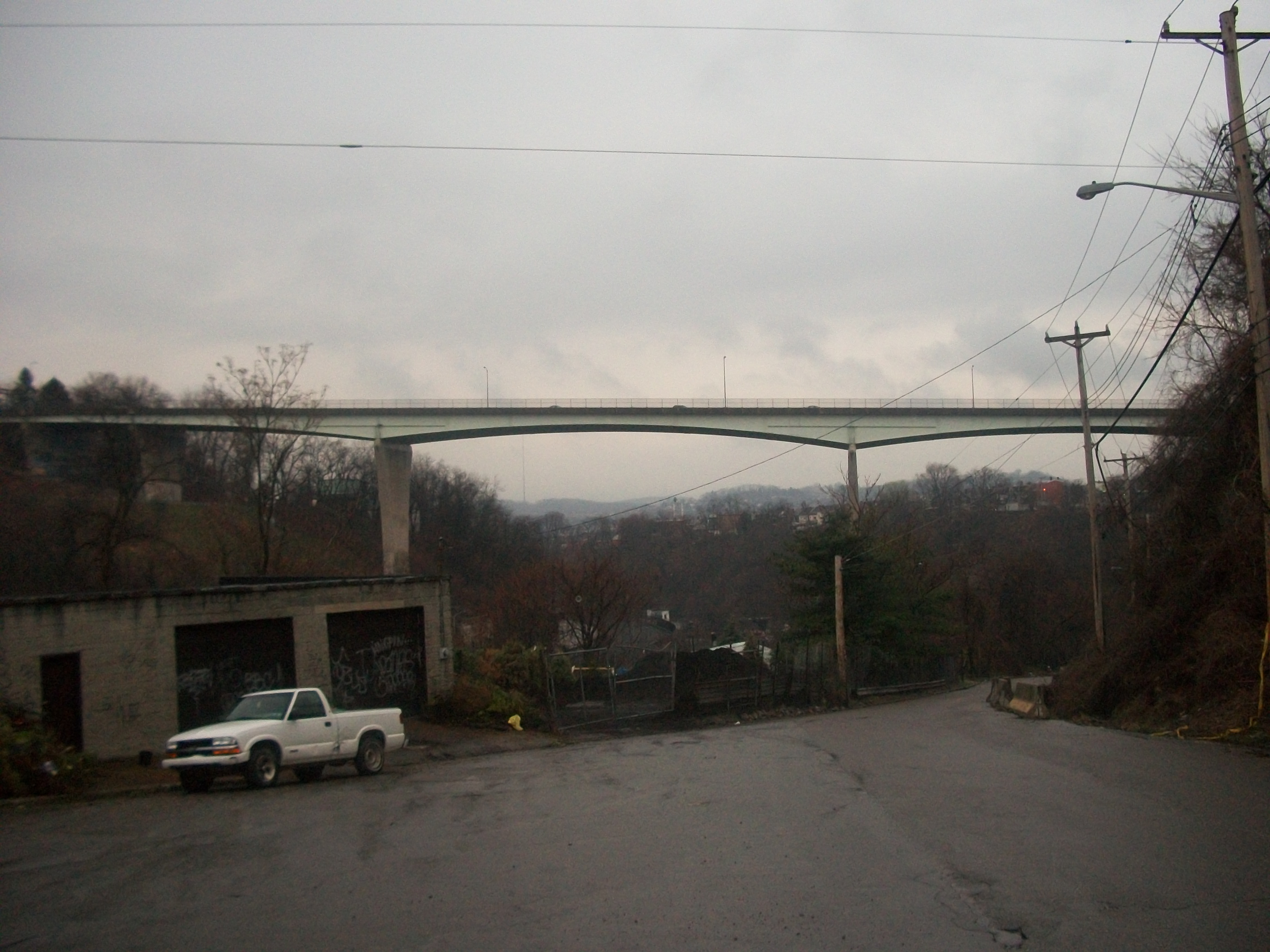
- Coordinates: 40.4605°N 79.9559°W
- Crosses: P&W Subdivision, Pittsburgh Line, Martin Luther King Jr. East Busway, Local streets
- Locale: Bloomfield and Polish Hill neighborhoods of Pittsburgh

Characteristics
- Design: Girder bridge
- Material: Steel
- Total length: 1,535 feet (468 m)
- Width: 4 lanes
- Clearance below: 150 feet (46 m)

History
- Designer: Gannett Fleming Engineering
- Opened: 1986

Location
- Interactive map of Bloomfield Bridge

The Bloomfield Bridge is a bridge in Pittsburgh, Pennsylvania, which carries four lanes of traffic across Skunk Hollow, a steep ravine between the densely populated neighborhoods of Bloomfield and Polish Hill.

== History ==
The first Bloomfield Bridge was a steel cantilever bridge built in 1914 by the Fort Pitt Bridge Works. The bridge was 2,100 feet (640 m) long with a 400-foot (120 m) main span consisting of two 140-foot (43 m) cantilever arms supporting a 120-foot (37 m) suspended section. It was designed by engineer T. J. Wilkerson and architect Stanley L. Roush and cost about $500,000. At the time of construction, it was the longest, highest, and one of the most expensive bridges in Pittsburgh. The bridge was dedicated on November 19, 1914, with what the Pittsburgh Post described as a "monster celebration" which included a wedding for a local couple performed at the midpoint of the span. This tradition was continued with the dedication of the replacement bridge in 1986, which also featured a wedding.

The old Bloomfield Bridge was closed in 1978 and demolished in 1980. The replacement crossing was erected in 1986, after the previous bridge was deemed deficient after years of heavy traffic, including that of popular Pittsburgh Railways streetcar lines until their 1960s conversion to buses. Although the first Bloomfield Bridge was closed in 1978, state funding issues halted work on constructing a successor until 1984.

== Location ==
On the Bloomfield side of the bridge, connections are made to Liberty Avenue, the commercial heart of the historically Italian neighborhood. On the Polish Hill side, PA 380 can be accessed, which runs toward Downtown Pittsburgh and Oakland, the home of several major universities.

The Bloomfield Bridge spans a large number of railroad tracks, which are portions of lines managed by CSX and Norfolk Southern. The Martin Luther King Jr. East Busway, a bus rapid transit system, also traverses the ravine. Also under the edifice is a community recreation center, featuring a swimming pool, baseball field, hockey rink, bocci courts, and a playground. Originally known as Dean's Field, it is historically significant as the place where Johnny Unitas played semi-pro football before jumpstarting his NFL career. After a shootout that killed three police officers, the park area was renamed for one of the officers who lived nearby.
