= West Side Belt Railroad =

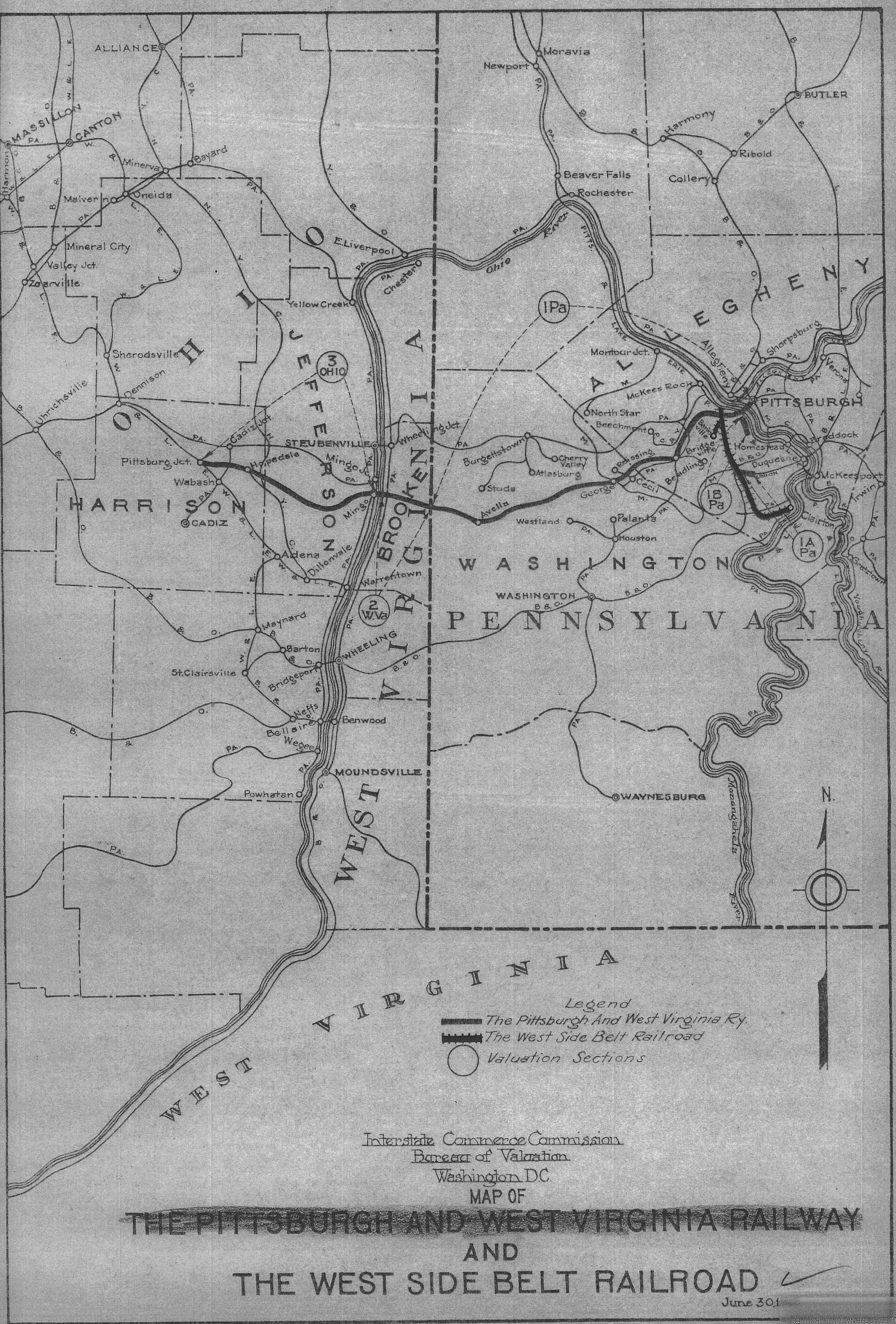
- ~1917 map of the railroad

Overview
- Reporting mark: WSB
- Locale: Pennsylvania
- Dates of operation: 1895–1920
- Successor: Pittsburgh and West Virginia

Technical
- Track gauge: 4 ft 8 1/2 in (1,435 mm) standard gauge
- Length: 22.5 miles

The West Side Belt Railroad (reporting mark WSB) was a standard gauge railroad incorporated July 25, 1895. It ran from Temperanceville, to Clairton, Pennsylvania, with a branch to Banksville. It acquired the Little Saw Mill Run Railroad by merger in 1897, and the Bruce and Clairton Railroad in 1901. The railroad was bankrupt in 1908. The line was purchased by the Pittsburgh and West Virginia Railway in 1920.
