= 30th Street Bridge =

Bridge in Pittsburgh, United States

Thirtieth Street Bridge
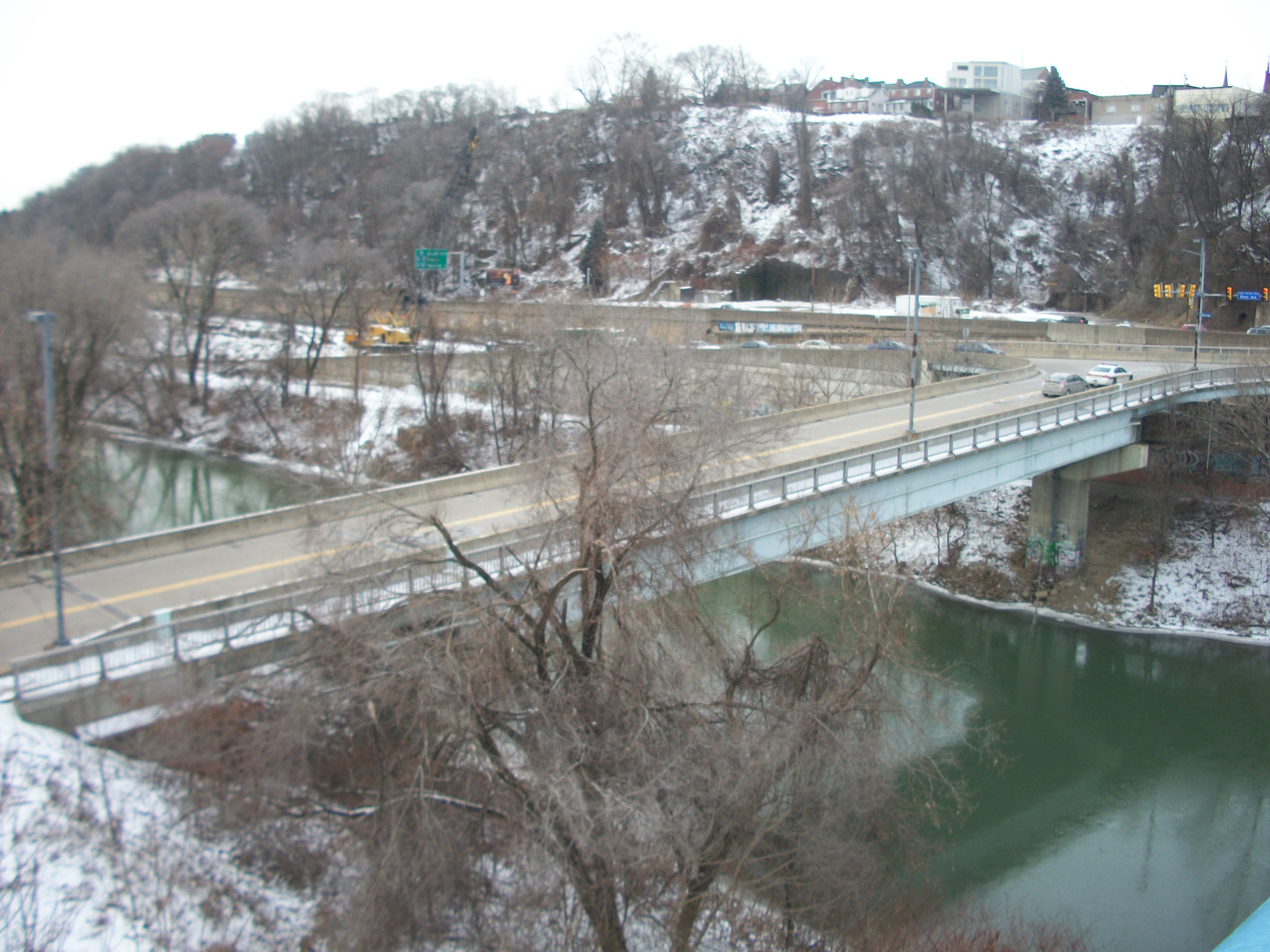
- Coordinates: 40.4640°N 79.9791°W
- Carries: 2 lanes of 30th Street
- Crosses: Allegheny River
- Locale: Pittsburgh

Characteristics
- Design: Girder bridge
- Total length: 105 feet (32 m)
- Longest span: 60 feet (18 m)
- Clearance below: 30 feet (9.1 m)

History
- Opened: 1986

The 30th Street Bridge is a girder bridge that carries vehicular traffic across the Allegheny River between the Pittsburgh neighborhoods of Troy Hill and Herrs Island (known by the moniker of Washington's Landing). This is the fourth bridge that has stood on this site. A wooden 19th Century bridge was washed away during an 1882 flood. This was replaced by an arch bridge that spanned the entire width of the Allegheny River; after a 1921 fire destroyed the span across the main channel, the 31st Street Bridge was constructed as a replacement, and this bridge was again relegated to taking traffic to Herrs Island. A 1939 truss bridge then stood on this site, and it was replaced by the current structure as part of the redevelopment of the island to feature condominiums and a business park instead of warehouses and stockyards.

== See also ==
- List of crossings of the Allegheny River
