= Senator Robert D. Fleming Bridge =

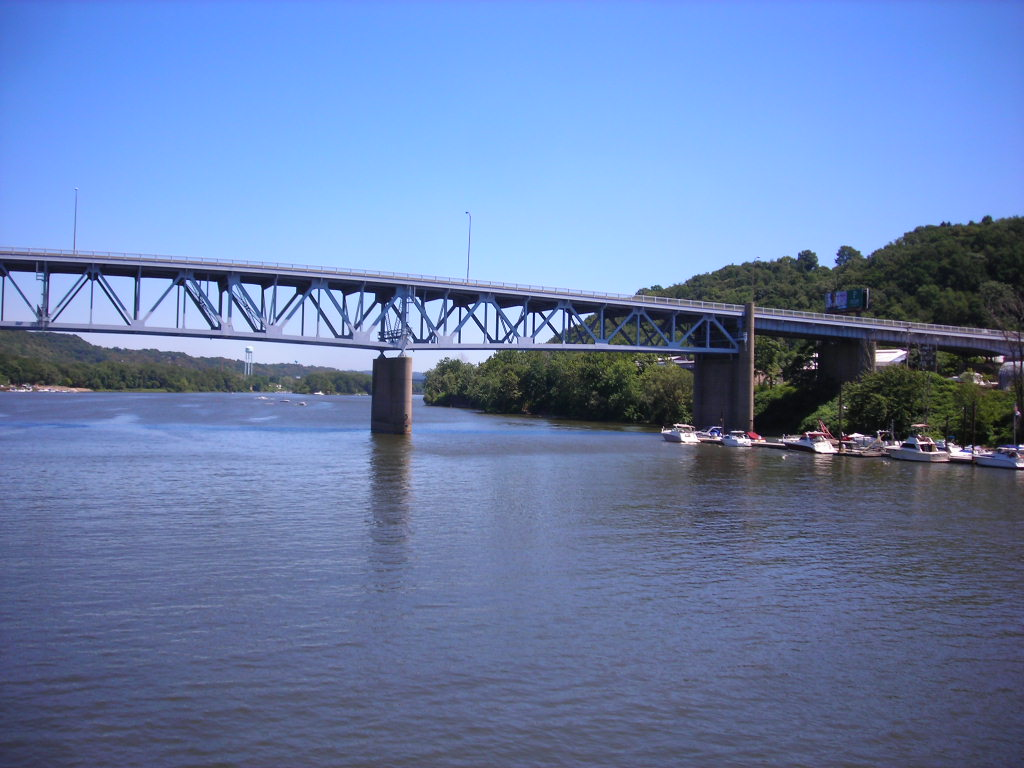
- Coordinates: 40.4912°N 79.9381°W
- Carries: 4 lanes of PA 8 (62nd Street)
- Crosses: Allegheny River
- Locale: Pittsburgh and Sharpsburg
- Other name(s): 62nd Street Bridge
- ID number: 02-0008-0180-0048

Characteristics
- Design: cantilever Warren Truss bridge
- Longest span: 370 feet (110 m)
- Clearance below: 51 feet (16 m)

History
- Constructed by: American Bridge Company
- Opened: July 1, 1962

The Senator Robert D. Fleming Bridge, commonly known as the 62nd Street Bridge, is a truss bridge that carries Pennsylvania Route 8 across the Allegheny River between the Pittsburgh neighborhoods of Morningside and Lawrenceville and Sharpsburg, Pennsylvania.

== History ==
The Allegheny was first crossed at this point by a wooden bridge, built in 1856. This was replaced by the Sharpsburg Bridge in 1901, which was itself replaced in 1962, as it was deemed too narrow for the traffic volume that it carried.

The current bridge was completed on July 1, 1962, and is named for Robert D. Fleming, a former Republican Pennsylvania state senator whose district included portions of Pittsburgh's northeastern suburbs. It was built alongside and just upstream from the old bridge and consists of sixteen individual spans, including a 1,054-foot-long (321 m) four-span truss channel unit, with a 400-foot-long (120 m) span over the river and a 494-foot-long (151 m) three-span girder section with a 227-foot-long (69 m) central span over the railroad.

A 200-foot-long (61 m) section of the bridge buckled when the Crescent Supply Co. warehouse beneath it was destroyed by fire on May 28, 1981. The bridge was reopened in January 1983.

== See also ==
- List of crossings of the Allegheny River
