= Abraham Kirkpatrick Lewis =

American pioneer coal miner

- Born: August 24, 1815
- Died: November 10, 1860 (aged 45)
- Citizenship: U.S.A.
- Education: Kenyon College
- Occupation: Mine operator
- Years active: 1844–1860
- Known for: Kirk Lewis Incline
- Spouse: Mary Orth
- Children: Dr. William David Lewis; Lucretia Orth Lewis LeMoyne
- Parents: Joel Lewis, M.D. (father); Mary Ann Kirkpatrick (mother)

Abraham Kirkpatrick Lewis was a pioneer coal miner in Pittsburgh, Pennsylvania. His namesake was his grandfather, Abraham Kirkpatrick, a colleague of General John Neville. He graduated from Kenyon College, Ohio, in 1835. Although he studied medicine and law, he made his living in the coal industry. With William Philpot and John M.Snowden Jr., he was the first to establish a market and furnish a regular supply of Pittsburgh coal to New Orleans, transporting the coal on flatboats.

== Coal Mines ==
His Coal Ridge Mine on Sawmill Run, opened in 1857, was originally served by a horse-drawn tramway, later converted to steam power as the Little Saw Mill Run Railroad.

== Kirk Lewis Incline ==
Kirk Lewis Coal Incline
Overview
- Headquarters: Pittsburgh, PA
- Locale: Pittsburgh, PA
- Dates of operation: 1854–

The Kirk Lewis incline was used to transport coal from "Coal Hill", now known as Mt. Washington, to the Monongahela River. It has been described as the first incline in Pittsburgh. It was probably built by George W. Roberts Sr., the superintendent of his mines, who was known to have built many coal inclines in the area, including those at Elizabeth, Pennsylvania.
