= 31st Street Bridge =

Bridge in Pittsburgh, United States

Thirty-First Street Bridge
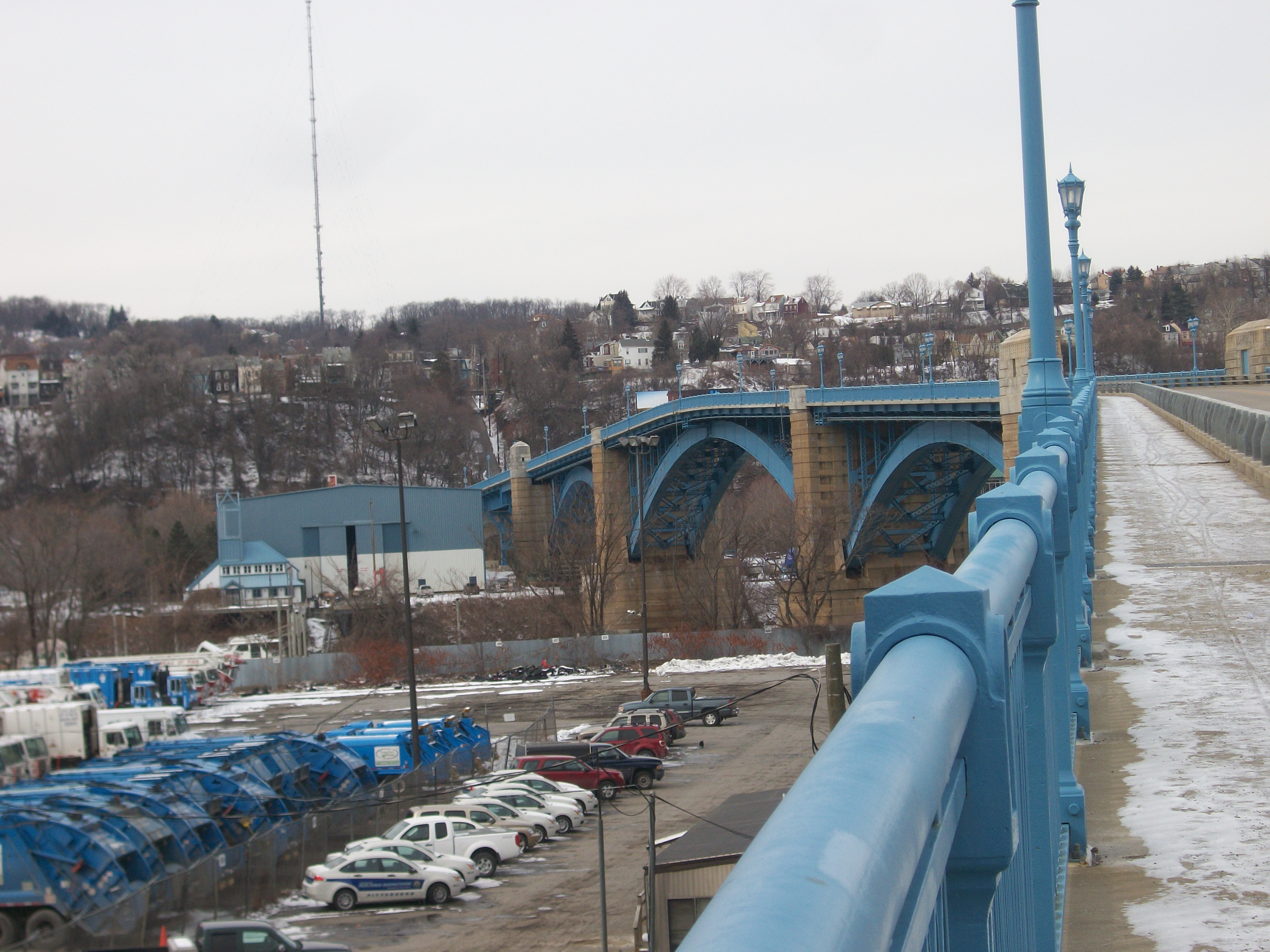
- Coordinates: 40.4630°N 79.9758°W
- Carries: 2 lanes of 31st Street
- Crosses: Allegheny River; Washington's Landing
- Locale: Pittsburgh
- Official name: William Raymond Prom Memorial Bridge
- Other name: 31st Street Bridge

Characteristics
- Design: Arch bridge
- Total length: 2,681 feet (817 m)
- Longest span: 360 feet (110 m)
- Clearance below: 72.6 feet (22.1 m)

History
- Opened: 1928
- Rebuilt: 2011–2012

Location
- Interactive map of Thirty-First Street Bridge

The William Raymond Prom Memorial Bridge, commonly known as the 31st Street Bridge, is an arch bridge that carries vehicular traffic across the Allegheny River between the Pittsburgh neighborhoods of Troy Hill and the Strip District. The bridge passes over but does not serve Washington's Landing, which is connected to the mainland by the 30th Street Bridge. Sidewalks along the bridge feature viewing platforms.

== History ==
This first documented bridge was built in 1887 and was destroyed by fire on July 8, 1921. The 1887 bridge replaced a two-span iron truss destroyed by a flood in 1882.

The bridge was built in 1927–1928 to replace an earlier through truss bridge aligned with 30th Street. A cable suspension footbridge was provided as a crossing while the new 31st Street bridge was being constructed.

The bridge was due to close on Tuesday, January 31, 2006, for a proposed $27 million refurbishment which would take two years. It eventually closed on February 14, 2006, and reopened by Mayor Luke Ravenstahl on November 21, 2007.

The portion of the bridge over the river's back channel was demolished with explosives on August 16, 2012, this was done in order to rebuild the segment to allow for the implementation of improvements to Route 28. Work on the reconstruction was completed by September 2012.

The bridge was renamed in 2013, from its former name of Thirty-First Street Bridge, Number Six Allegheny River to William Raymond Prom Memorial Bridge, to honor William R. Prom, who was killed in Vietnam.

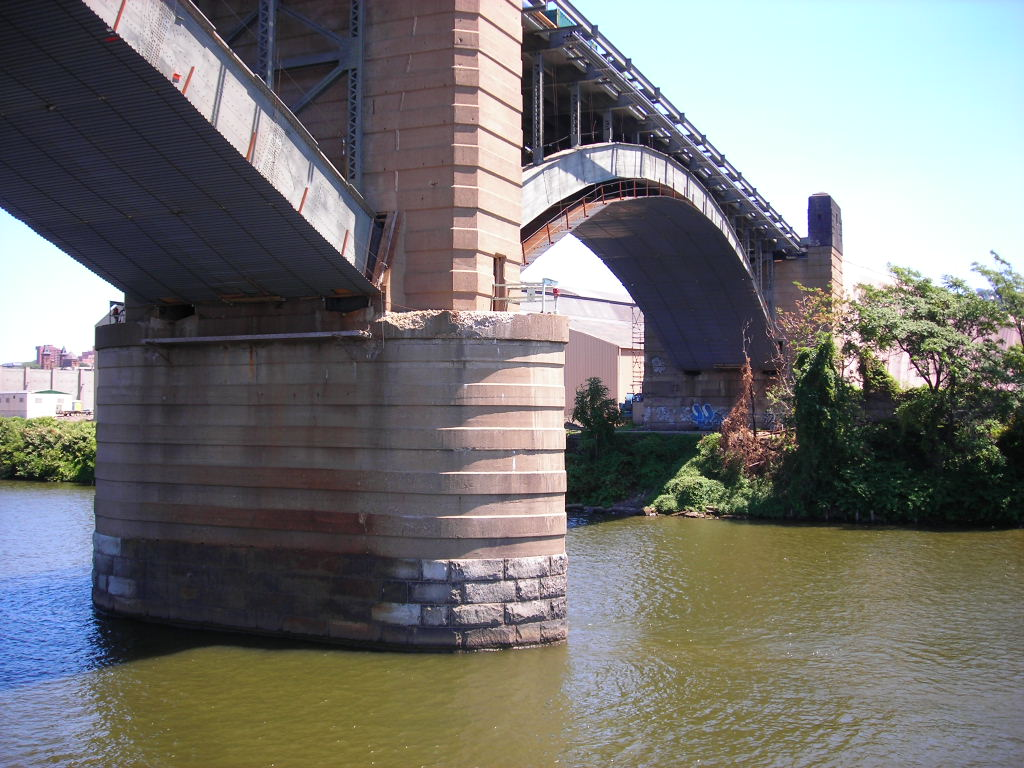
Bridge supports from the river.

== See also ==
- List of crossings of the Allegheny River
