= Hot Metal Bridge =

Bridge over the Monongahela River in Pittsburgh, Pennsylvania

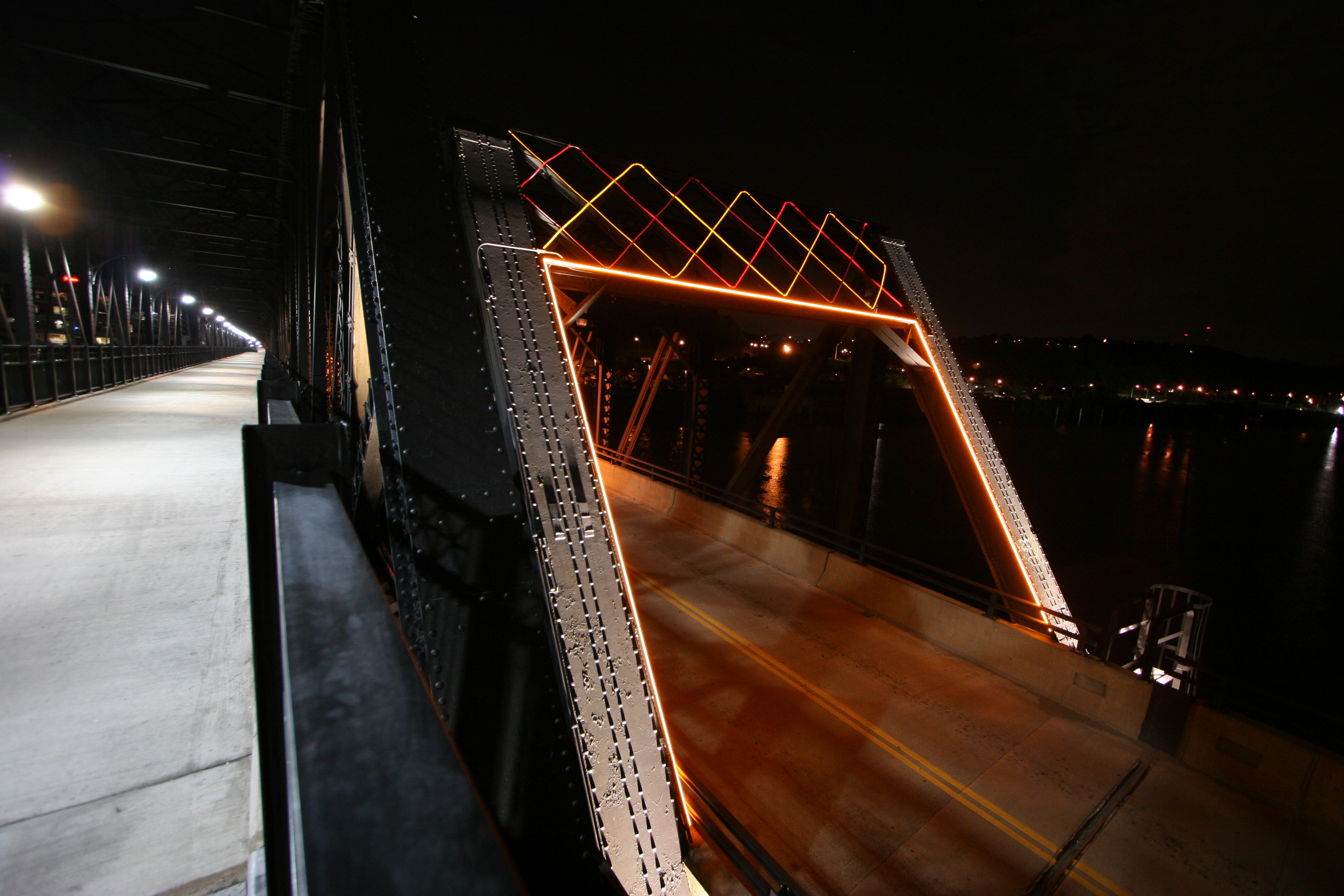
- Roadway south portal from the bike trail.
- Coordinates: 40.428268°N 79.960776°W
- Carries: South 29th Street; Mon Con: motor vehicles, 2 lanes Hot Metal: converted for pedestrian and bicycles
- Crosses: Monongahela River
- Locale: Pittsburgh, Pennsylvania
- Official name: Monongahela Connecting Railroad Bridge and Hot Metal Bridge
- Other name(s): MC RR Bridge, Mon Con Bridge, pghe588-14

Characteristics
- Design: Truss bridge
- Total length: 1,174 feet (358 m)
- Longest span: 321 feet (98 m)
- Clearance below: 48.4 feet (14.8 m)

History
- Designer: William Glyde Wilkins?
- Opened: 1887

Pittsburgh Landmark – PHLF
- Designated: 2009

Location
- Interactive map of Hot Metal Bridge

The Hot Metal Bridge is a truss bridge in Pittsburgh, Pennsylvania, that crosses the Monongahela River. The bridge consists of two parallel spans on a single set of piers: the former Monongahela Connecting Railroad Bridge, built in 1887, on the upstream side and the former Hot Metal Bridge, built in 1900, on the downstream side. The Monongahela Connecting Railroad Bridge carried conventional railroad traffic, while the Hot Metal Bridge connected parts of the J&L Steel mill, carrying crucibles of molten iron from the blast furnaces in ladle transfer cars to the open hearth furnaces on the opposite bank to be converted to steel. During World War II 15% of America's steel making capacity crossed over the Hot Metal Bridge, up to 180 tons per hour. The upstream span was converted to road use after a $14.6 million restoration, and opened by Mayor Tom Murphy with a ceremony honoring former steel workers on June 23, 2000. The bridge connects 2nd Avenue at the Pittsburgh Technology Center in South Oakland with Hot Metal Street (South 29th Street) in the South Side. The downstream span reopened for pedestrian and bicycle use in late 2007 after two years of work. The Great Allegheny Passage hiker/biker trail passes over this bridge as it approaches Pittsburgh's Golden Triangle area.

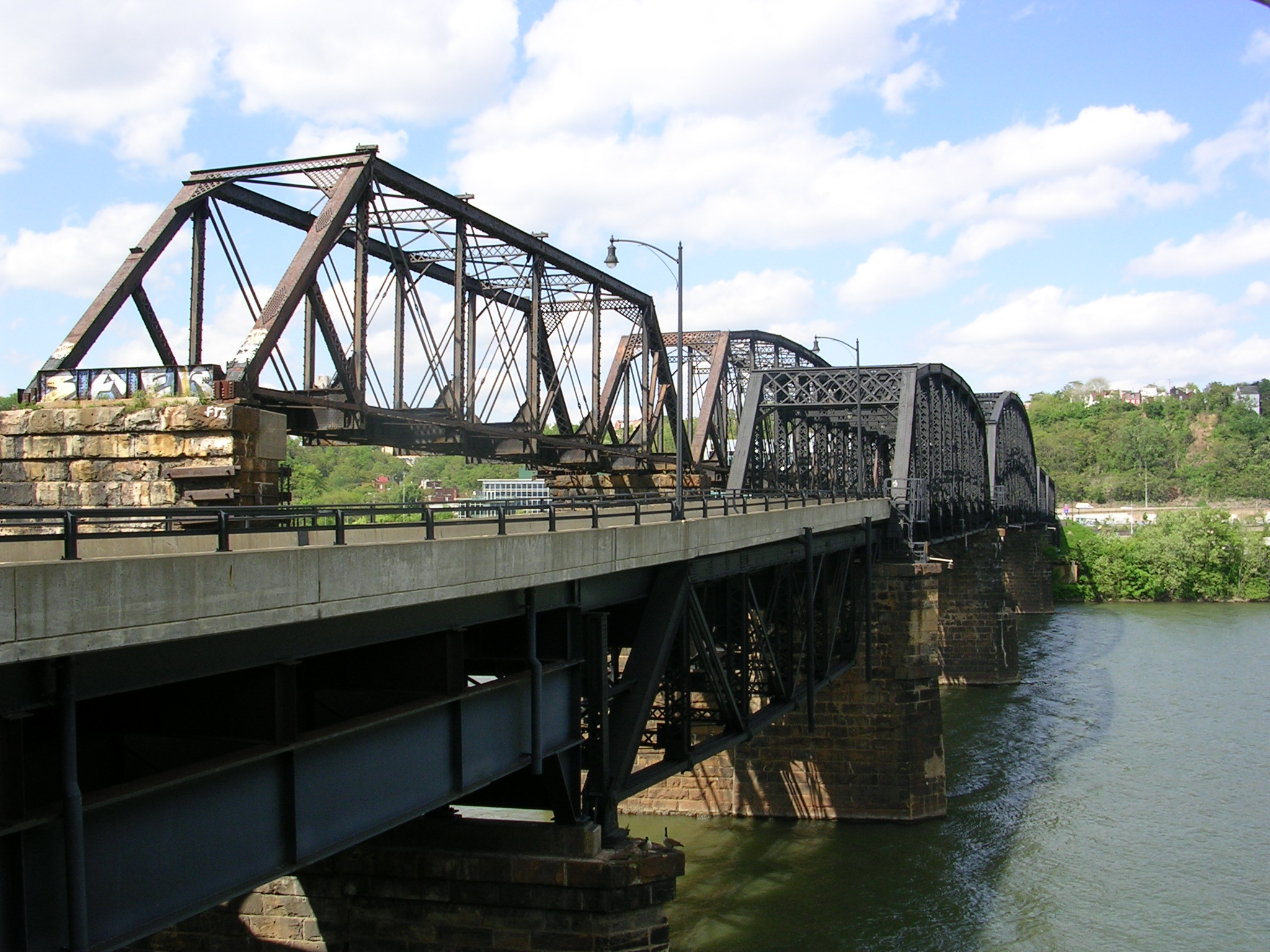
2006 view, before the pedestrian and bicycle bridge opened

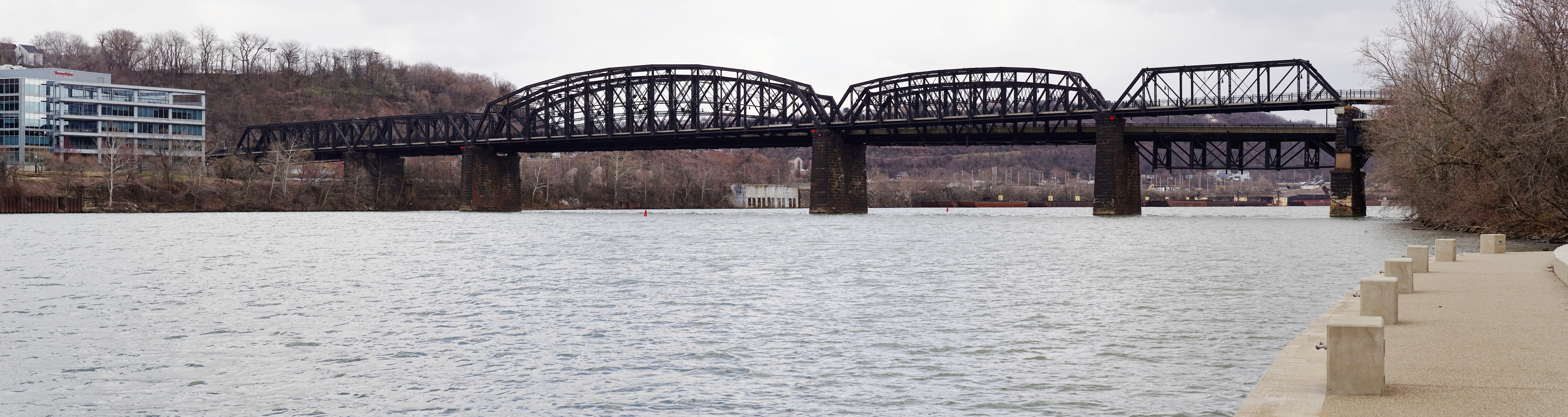
2016 view, after pedestrian and bicycle bridge opened

The Pittsburgh History and Landmarks Foundation was responsible for managing the decorative lighting project for the bridge, which was lit with energy-efficient light-emitting diode (LED) and optical fiber technology on June 12, 2008.

The Hot Metal Bridge was inducted into the North America Railway Hall of Fame in 2016.

== Popular culture ==
The Hot Metal Bridge is the namesake of the defunct Hot Metal Grille at the nearby SouthSide Works shopping center.

The bridge was in several scenes of the 2011 film Warrior starring Jennifer Morrison and Nick Nolte.

== See also ==
- List of bridges documented by the Historic American Engineering Record in Pennsylvania
- List of crossings of the Monongahela River
- Pittsburgh bridges
- Great Allegheny Passage
- Pig iron
