= Little Saw Mill Run Railroad =

Overview
- Locale: Allegheny County, Pennsylvania
- Dates of operation: 1853–1897
- Predecessor: horse-drawn tramway designed by Abraham Kirkpatrick Lewis (Kirk Lewis).
- Successor: West Side Belt Railroad

Technical
- Track gauge: 4 ft 8 1/2 in (1,435 mm) standard gauge
- Length: 21 miles

The Little Saw Mill Run Railroad was a 4 ft 8 1/2 in (1,435 mm) standard gauge American coal railroad that was located in Allegheny County, Pennsylvania.

== History ==
This railroad company was incorporated July 23, 1850, and opened in April 1853. Originally, it was owned by the Harmony Society, and ran from Temperanceville, Pennsylvania on the Ohio River to Banksville, Pennsylvania, running parallel to Saw Mill Run and Little Saw Mill Run. In an agreement with the 3 ft (914 mm) narrow gauge Pittsburgh Southern Railroad, it ran dual gauge tracks.

It became part of the railroad empire of George J. Gould, merging with the West Side Belt Railroad in 1897. The superintendent of the Marine Railway at Sawmill Run for 13 years was Captain Edward Boland.
