= Pittsburgh Southern Railway =

Overview
- Locale: Pennsylvania, U.S.
- Dates of operation: 1876–1884
- Predecessor: Pittsburgh, Castle Shannon and Washington Railroad, Pittsburgh Railroad, Washington Railroad
- Successor: Baltimore and Ohio Short Line Railroad

Technical
- Track gauge: 4 ft 8 1/2 in (1,435 mm) standard gauge
- Previous gauge: 3 ft (914 mm) gauge
- Length: 37 miles (60 km)

The Pittsburgh Southern Railway was a railroad system that was located in the Commonwealth of Pennsylvania, United States.

== History and notable features ==
This American railroad system was built in March 1879 through the merger of the 3 ft (914 mm) narrow gauge Pittsburgh Southern Railroad (which was the 3 ft 4 in (1,016 mm) narrow gauge Pittsburgh, Castle Shannon and Washington Railroad from July 1877 to April 1878), Pittsburgh Railroad, and Washington Railroad. It ran from Washington to Castle Shannon, where it connected to the Pittsburgh and Castle Shannon Railroad.

An attempt to use the 4 ft 8 1/2 in (1,435 mm) standard gauge Little Saw Mill Run Railroad as a substitute connection to Pittsburgh using dual gauge track led to the Castle Shannon Railroad War of 1878.

In 1883, it was converted to 4 ft 8 1/2 in (1,435 mm) standard gauge. After a year, it was purchased by the Baltimore and Ohio Railroad on November 20, 1884, and they reorganized them as the Baltimore & Ohio Short Line Railroad.
