= Herrs Island =

Herrs Island Washington's Landing
- Sub-neighborhood
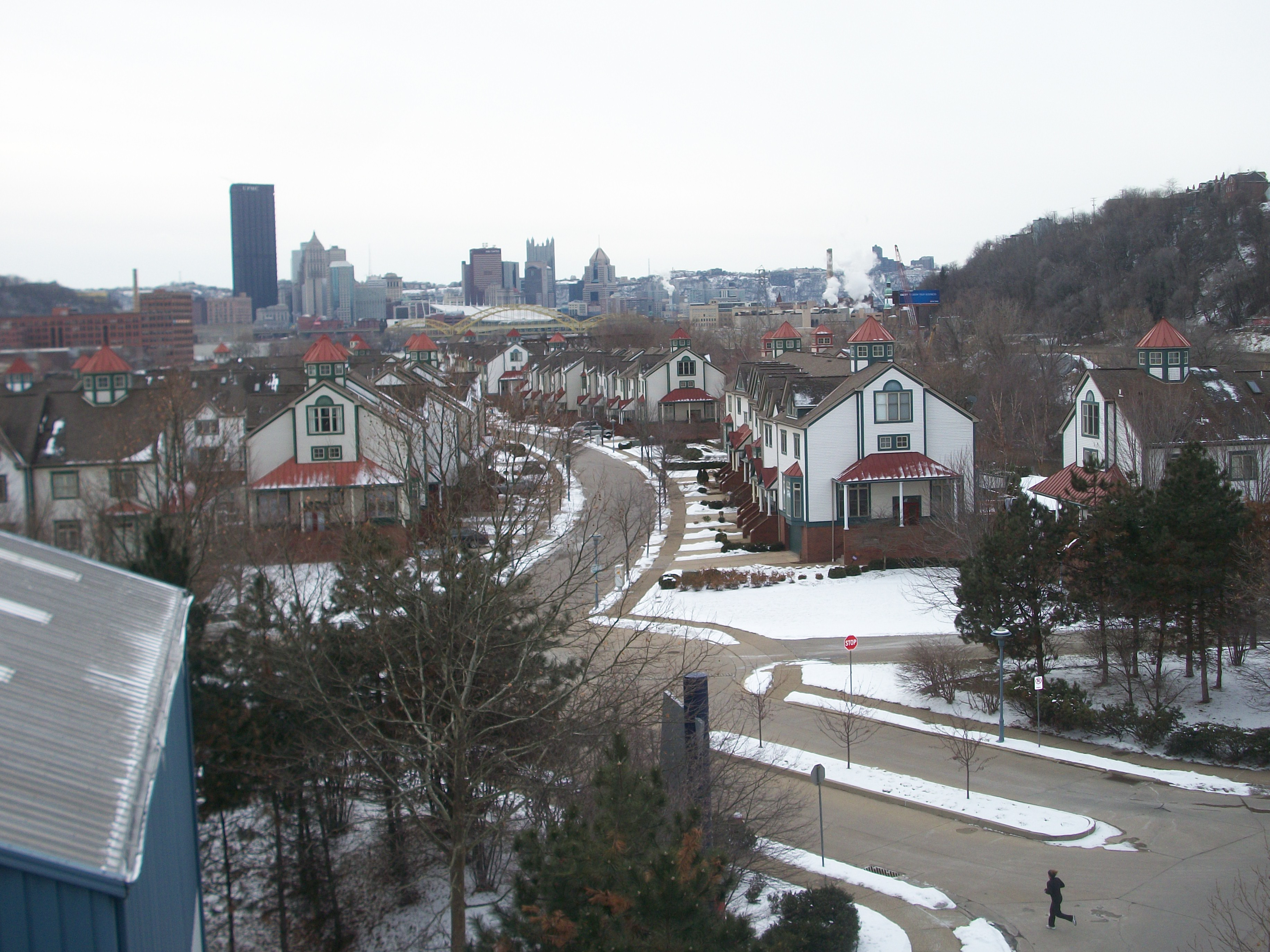
- Herrs Island from the 31st Street Bridge, with Downtown in the distance

- Location in Pittsburgh
- Coordinates: 40.4667°N 79.975°W
- Country: United States
- State: Pennsylvania
- County: Allegheny County
- City: Pittsburgh

Herrs Island, also known as Washington's Landing, is an island in the Allegheny River in Pittsburgh in the U.S. state of Pennsylvania. It is officially considered part of the Troy Hill neighborhood.

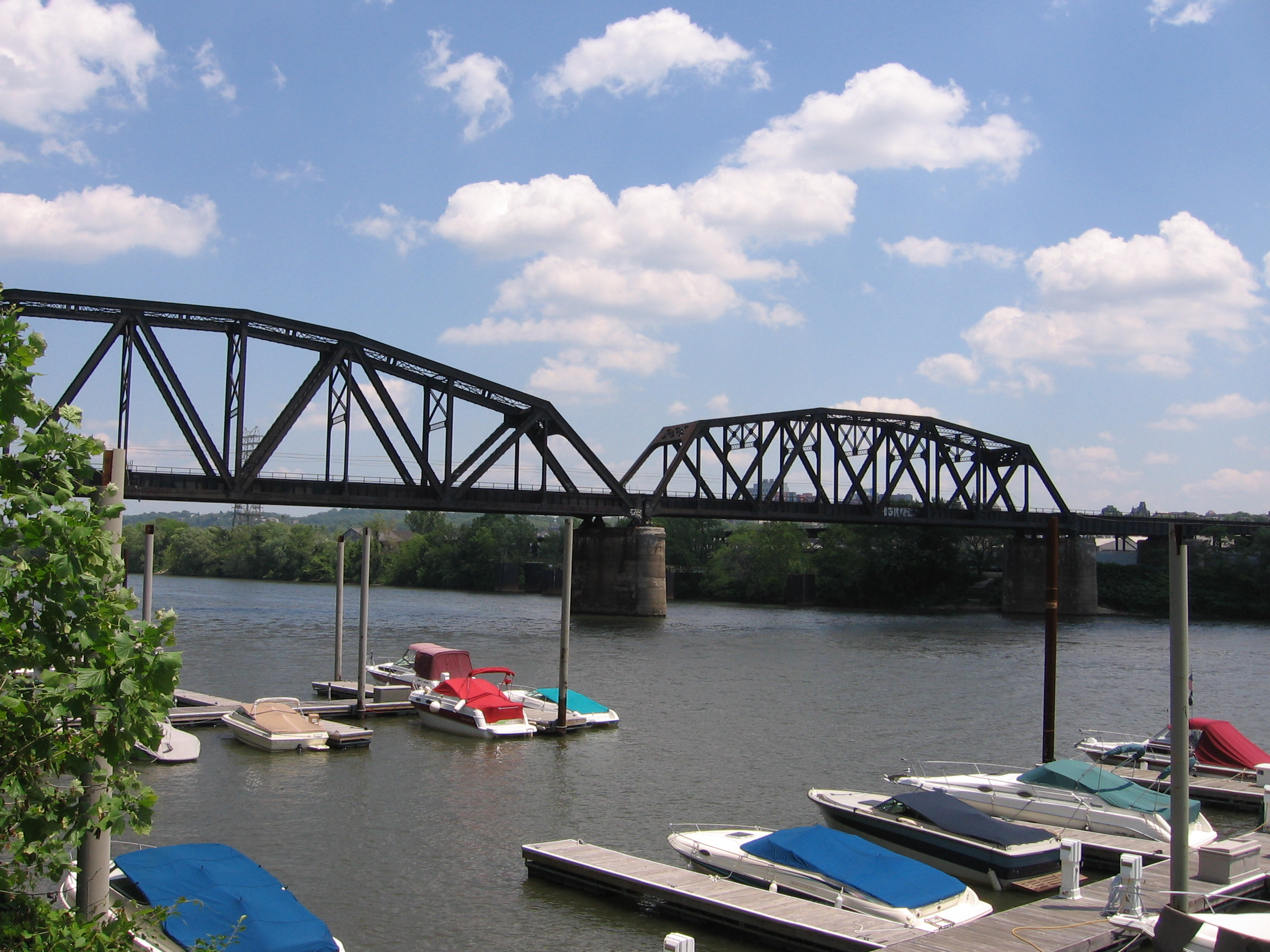
The 33rd Street Railroad Bridge is a (partially disused) bridge that connects with the island. The photo was taken from the island itself.

== Rehabilitation ==
As a result of the industrial activity, Herrs Island was a brownfield site. By the 1970s, most industrial activity on the island had left. During the 1980s and 1990s, a major redevelopment effort was undertaken after a long study of best uses.

The island is now a showcase project of urban redevelopment for the City of Pittsburgh. It is now a mixed-use community, home to townhomes and business parks, a marina, the Three Rivers Rowing Association, and the Western Pennsylvania Conservancy.

The northern portion of Herrs Island contains a small park with tennis courts, a public lawn, and manicured landscapes. A section of the Three Rivers Heritage Trail loops around the island, offering a crushed-gravel pedestrian path with several scenic overlooks of the Allegheny River.

== Head of the Ohio ==
Since 1987, the island and piers have hosted the starting point for the annual Head of the Ohio crew race. The Three Rivers Rowing Association also maintains their boathouses on the island.
