= 33rd Street Railroad Bridge =

Truss bridge in Pennsylvania, U.S.

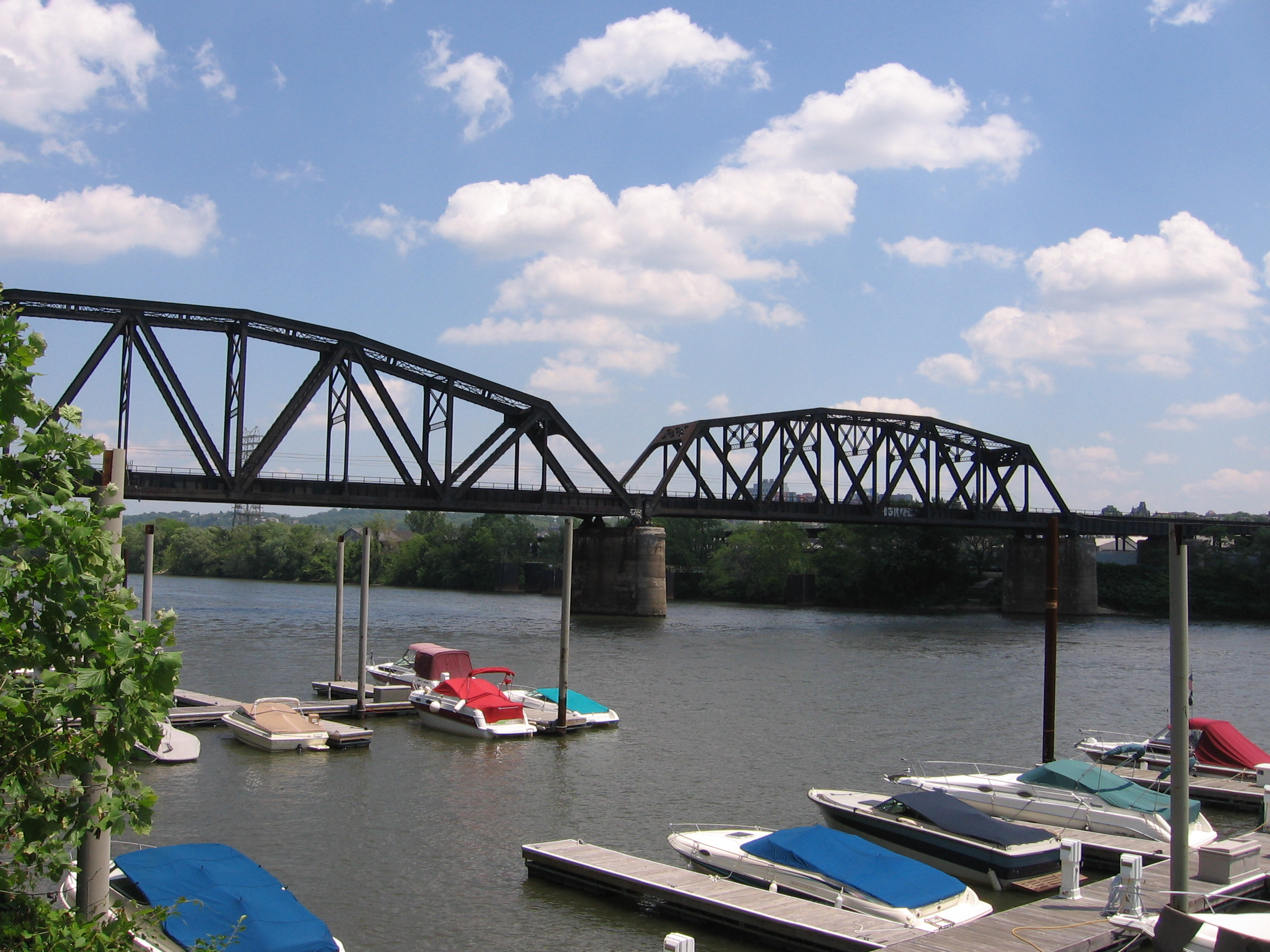
- The downstream side of the 33rd Street Railroad Bridge.
- Coordinates: 40.4657°N 79.9736°W
- Carries: Allegheny Valley Railroad (P&W Subdivision)
- Crosses: Allegheny River
- Locale: Pittsburgh, Pennsylvania
- Other name(s): B&O Railroad Bridge at 33rd Street and Herr's Island

Characteristics
- Design: Truss bridge
- Material: Steel
- Longest span: 400 feet (120 m)
- Clearance below: 44.9 feet (13.7 m)

History
- Opened: 1921

The 33rd Street Railroad Bridge is a truss bridge that carries the Allegheny Valley Railroad on the P&W Subdivision over the Allegheny River that connects downtown Pittsburgh, Pennsylvania to Herrs Island, Pittsburgh, United States.

== History ==
The Allegheny River was first crossed at this point by a railroad bridge built in 1884 by the Iron City Bridge Works, which moved to Pittsburgh from Cincinnati in 1856.

This was replaced by the B&O bridge in 1921.

== See also ==
List of crossings of the Allegheny River
