= Brilliant Cutoff Viaduct of the Pennsylvania Railroad =

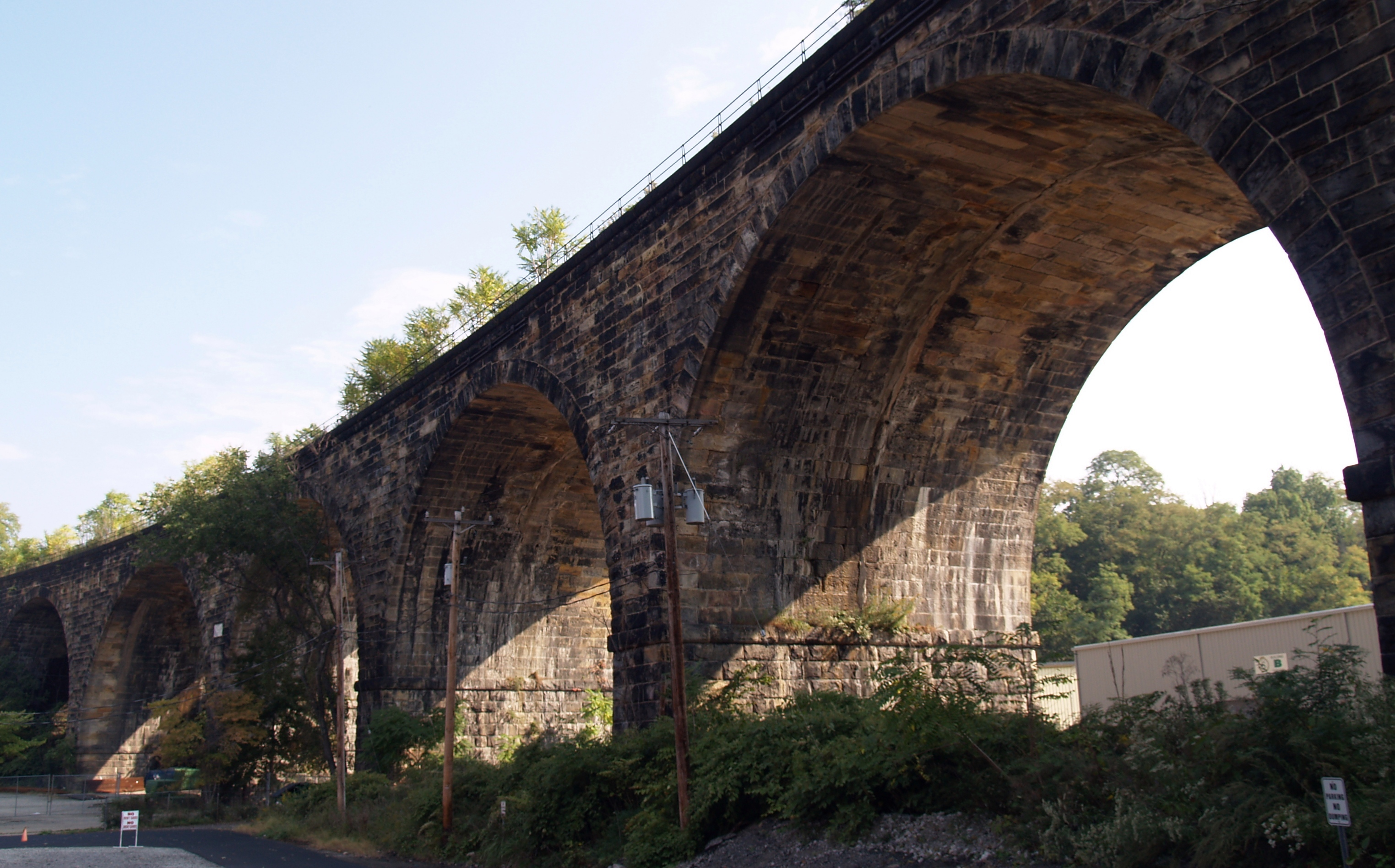

- Location of Brilliant Cutoff Viaduct of the Pennsylvania Railroad in Pittsburgh
- 40°27′44″N 79°54′18″W
- Location: Along Washington Boulevard, Lincoln-Lemington-Belmar/Homewood, Pittsburgh, Pennsylvania, USA

History
- Built: 1902

Site notes
- Architect: William H. Brown

Pittsburgh Landmark – PHLF
- Designated: 2003

The Brilliant Cutoff Viaduct of the Pennsylvania Railroad is located along Washington Boulevard in the Lincoln-Lemington-Belmar/Homewood neighborhoods of Pittsburgh, Pennsylvania. It carries the Brilliant Branch, a small connector railway, and was built in 1902. It was added to the List of Pittsburgh History and Landmarks Foundation Historic Landmarks in 2003.

== See also ==
- List of bridges documented by the Historic American Engineering Record in Pennsylvania
