= Three Rivers Heritage Trail =

Trail system in Pittsburgh, Pennsylvania

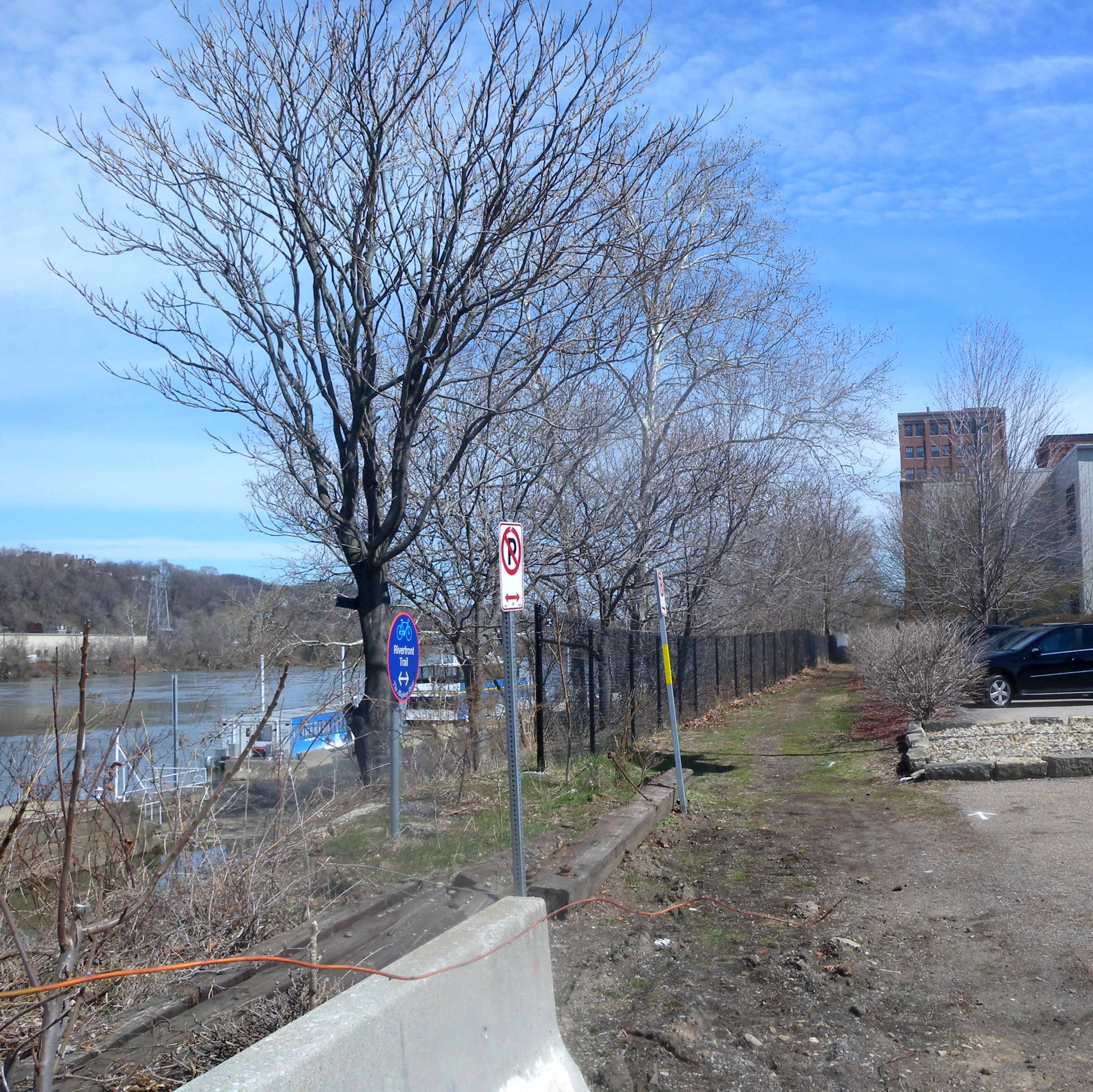
- Unpaved portion in Strip District
- Location: Pittsburgh; Allegheny County
- Designation: National Recreation Trail
- Use: Multi-use trail
- Season: All
- Sights: Pittsburgh

The Three Rivers Heritage Trail is an urban rail trail paralleling the riverbanks in Pittsburgh, Pennsylvania and Allegheny County for about 33 miles (53 km), often on both sides of the rivers, and offering views of the city. The trail owned largely owned by the City of Pittsburgh with support from community groups.

The stated mission is to increase awareness and engagement with the region's rivers and riverfronts through activities and stewardship, and to extend the water and land trails on the major rivers within Allegheny County.

== Description ==
At the Pittsburgh Point State Park, there are three rivers: the Allegheny River and Monongahela River, which unite to form the Ohio River. The Three Rivers Heritage Trail extends three miles (5 km) up the north side of the Allegheny River to Millvale, and also three miles (5 km) down the north bank of the Ohio River to Brunot Island. On the Monongahela River, the trail goes five miles (8 km) upriver from Station Square to a point just short of the Waterfront Shopping District.

Within the city, the trail takes the names of neighborhoods through which it passes. The north bank of the Allegheny River is Pittsburgh's North Side also known as Northside, and the trail is referred to locally as the 'North Shore Trail'. On the north bank of the Ohio River, the trail is called the 'Chateau Trail' after the neighborhood along which it runs. On the south bank of the Allegheny, it goes through the food market area and is called the 'Strip District Trail'.

On Monongahela River's north bank, it is called the 'Eliza Furnace Trail' because it passes the site where the Jones and Laughlin Steel Company once had its Eliza Furnaces. Some people call this section the 'Jail Trail' because it also passes the Allegheny County Jail on its way to Oakland, the university center of the city. A branch that extends into Schenley Park in Oakland is called the 'Junction Hollow Trail'. As it moves further up the Monongahela River towards Frick Park, it is called the 'Duck Hollow Trail', because that is where a stream exits the park into the Monongahela. On the south bank of the Monongahela in Pittsburgh's South Side, it is called the 'South Side Trail'.

The trail hosts public art and has 61 interpretive signs along the trail, highlighting the region's heritage and riverfront ecology.

Pittsburgh is one terminus of the 335-mile-long (539 km) 'Great Allegheny Passage' (GAP) that connects the city to Cumberland, Maryland and Washington, D.C. The route of the GAP uses five miles (8 km) of the 'Three Rivers Heritage Trail'. Within the city, the GAP goes from the Waterfront Mall and Sandcastle upstream on the Monongahela River, and then at the SouthSide Works crosses the river on the Hot Metal Bridge. Finally, it uses the north bank of the Monongahela to reach the Pittsburgh Point.

The 'Friends of the Riverfront' have also developed and administer the 'Three Rivers Water Trail', along the riverfronts of Allegheny County, for kayakers and canoeists, with access points, parking areas, and boat racks. For many years, the trail hosted the annual 'Pittsburgh Triathlon', a competition for top athletes who use the land and water routes to bike, run, and swim for this Olympic qualifier. A less demanding version is the 'Adventure Race', for friends, families, and teams who wish to paddle, bike, and run a shorter yet challenging course.

== See also ==
- Great Allegheny Passage
- Chesapeake and Ohio Canal National Historical Park
- Erie to Pittsburgh Trail
- Montour Trail
- Ohio River Trail
- Steel Valley Trail
- Youghiogheny River Trail
- List of rail trails
