= Glenwood B&O Railroad Bridge =

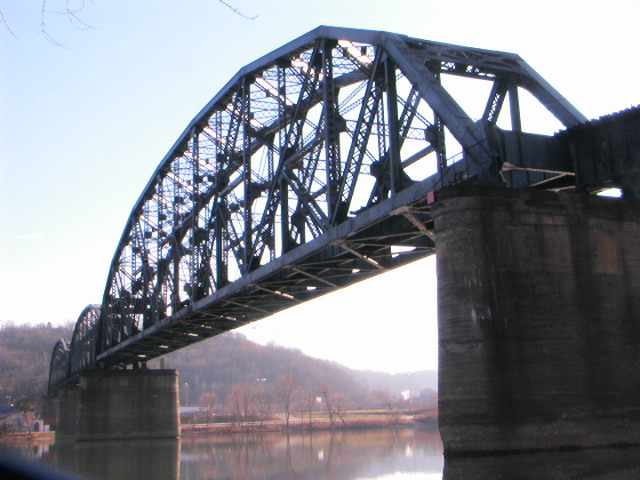
- Coordinates: 40.3984°N 79.9314°W
- Carries: W&P Subdivision
- Crosses: Monongahela River
- Locale: Pittsburgh, Pennsylvania, U.S.
- Other name(s): Wheeling bridge

Characteristics
- Design: Pratt truss bridge
- Material: Steel
- Total length: 2,397 feet (731 m)
- Longest span: 453 feet (138 m)
- No. of spans: 3 main
- Piers in water: 4
- Clearance below: 50.5 feet (15.4 m)

History
- Constructed by: American Bridge Company
- Opened: 1884

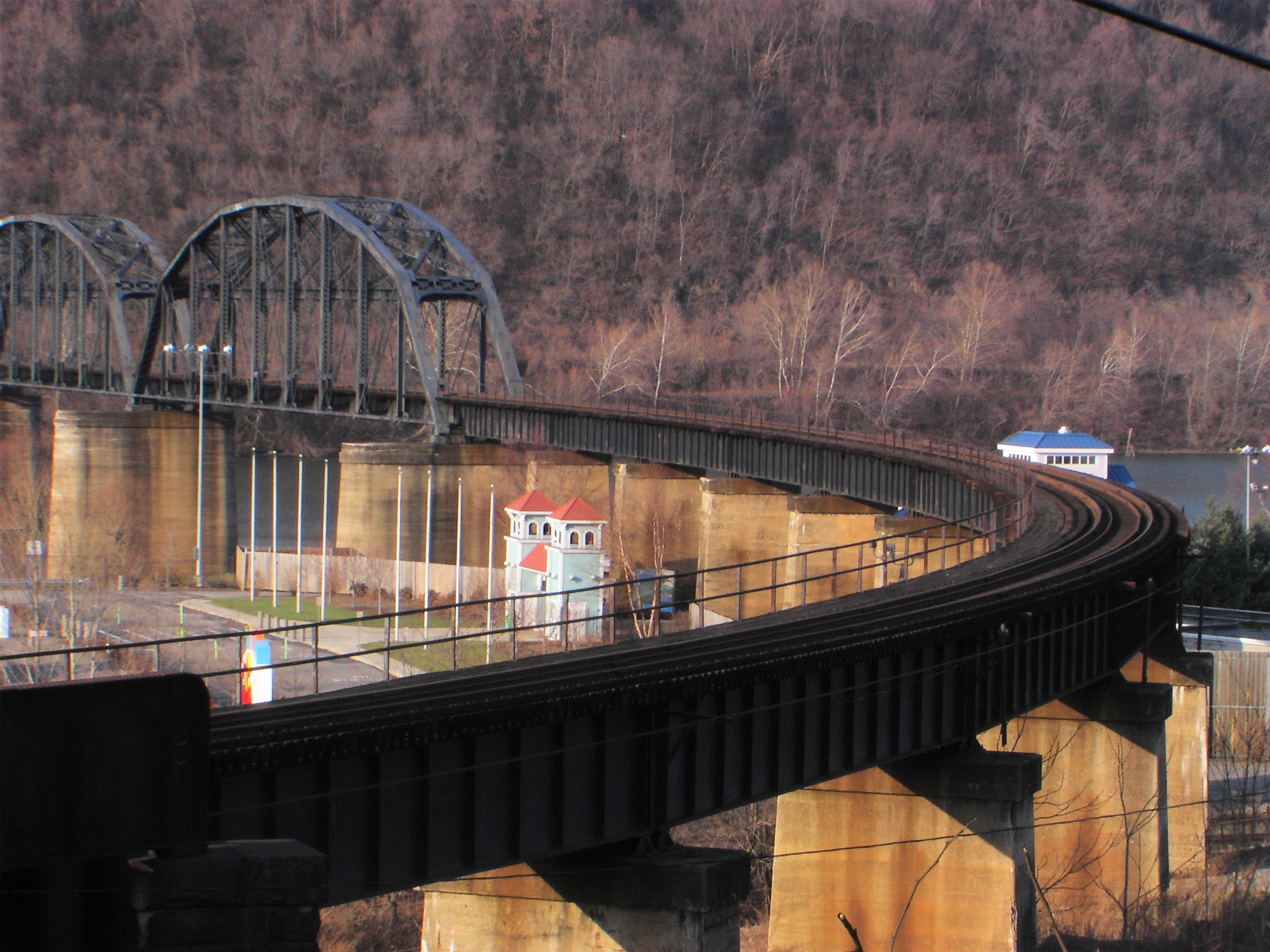

The Glenwood B&O Railroad Bridge is a truss bridge in Pittsburgh, Pennsylvania, which carries Allegheny Valley Railroad's W&P Subdivision over the Monongahela River.

The span was constructed in 1884 and upgraded in 1915. It served the busy Wheeling division of the Baltimore and Ohio Railroad, which in 1928, operated an average of 19 freight and 12 passenger trains across the structure each day. After B&O was absorbed into CSX Transportation, this company ran local freight trains across the bridge; the short line Allegheny Valley Railroad has a long-term lease to manage this structure, which serves a route between its headquarters in an adjacent rail yard and Washington, Pennsylvania.

== See also ==
- List of crossings of the Monongahela River
