= P&W Subdivision =

Railway line in Pennsylvania

Overview
- Status: Operational
- Owner: CSX
- Locale: western Pennsylvania
- Termini: Rankin; West Pittsburg

Service
- Type: Freight rail and passenger rail
- Operators: CSX; AVRR; Amtrak; BPRR

Technical
- Track gauge: 1,435 mm (4 ft 8 1/2 in)

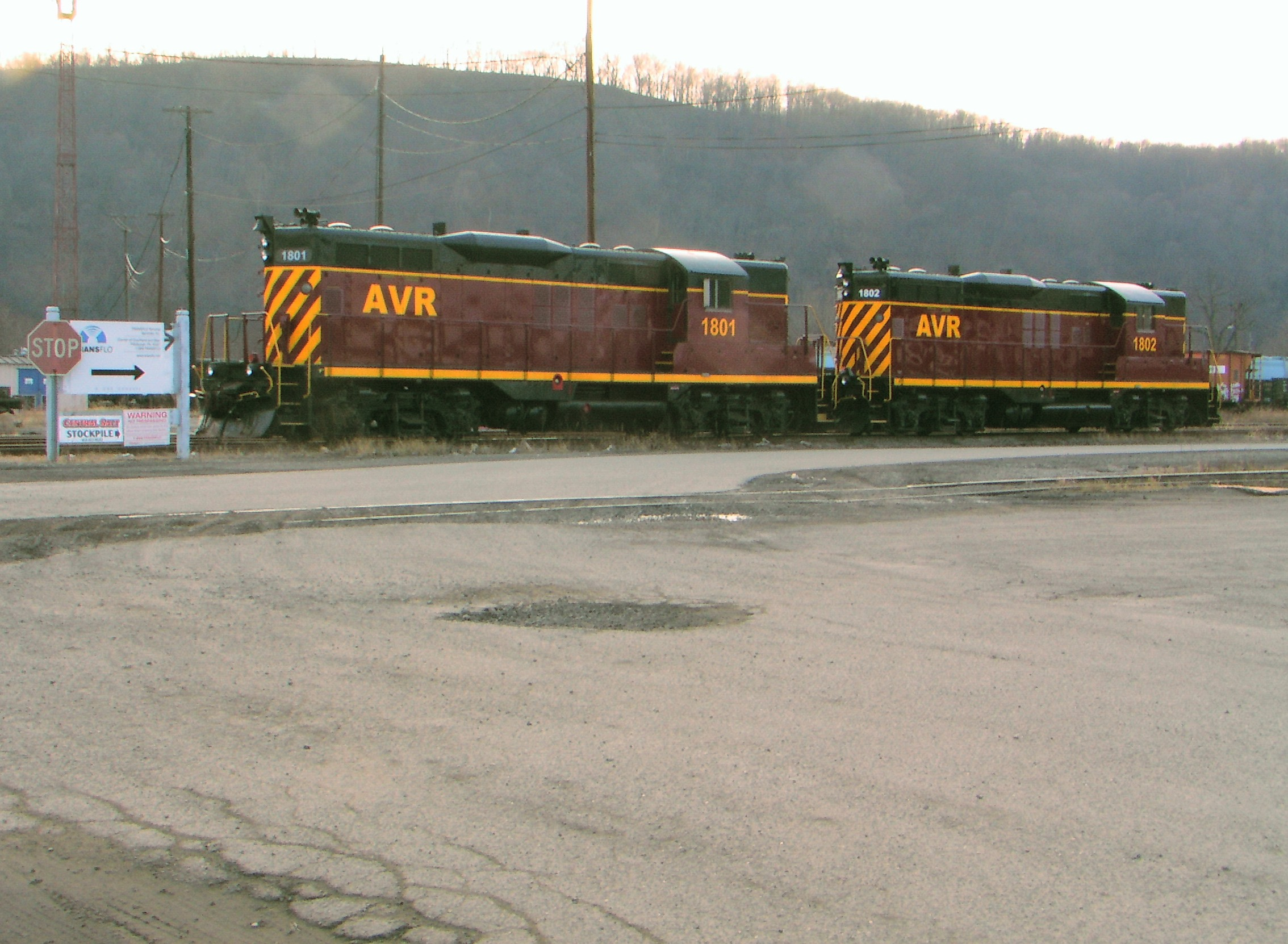
AVR locomotives in Glenwood

The P&W Subdivision is a railroad line owned and operated by CSX Transportation, the Allegheny Valley Railroad (AVR), and the Buffalo and Pittsburgh Railroad (BPRR) in the U.S. state of Pennsylvania. The line runs from Rankin north through Pittsburgh to West Pittsburg (near New Castle) along a former Baltimore and Ohio Railroad line, once the Pittsburgh and Western Railroad.

The line begins in Rankin at the Pittsburgh Subdivision, almost directly under the Rankin Bridge, and runs along the east (right) shore of the Monongahela River. It meets the AVR's W&P Subdivision near the Glenwood Bridge in Glenwood, and continues near the river to near Greenfield. A line once branched out to the Pittsburgh B&O train station here, on the current Eliza Furnace Trail. Then the line turns north away from the river, and continues into Junction Hollow and through the Schenley Tunnel which goes under Oakland to Bloomfield. There it crosses and connects with the Norfolk Southern Railway's Pittsburgh Line; CSX ownership ends, and AVR ownership begins, here. The line continues northwest, junctioning with the AVR's main line and then immediately crossing the Allegheny River on the 33rd Street Railroad Bridge. It turns northeast along the west (right) bank of the river to Etna, turning north there. The AVR owns the line until Glenshaw, where BPRR ownership begins. The Northern Subdivision heads east from Harmony Junction in Eidenau, and the P&W Subdivision continues northwest to the east (left) side of the Beaver River near Ellwood City. It then heads north near the river to West Pittsburg, where it merges with CSX's New Castle Terminal Subdivision near the Pennsylvania Route 168 overpass.

Amtrak's Floridian uses the CSX portion of the line, switching to the NS Pittsburgh Line at Bloomfield.

== History ==
The Pittsburgh and Connellsville Railroad opened the oldest section of the P&W Subdivision, from Rankin to Greenfield, in 1857.

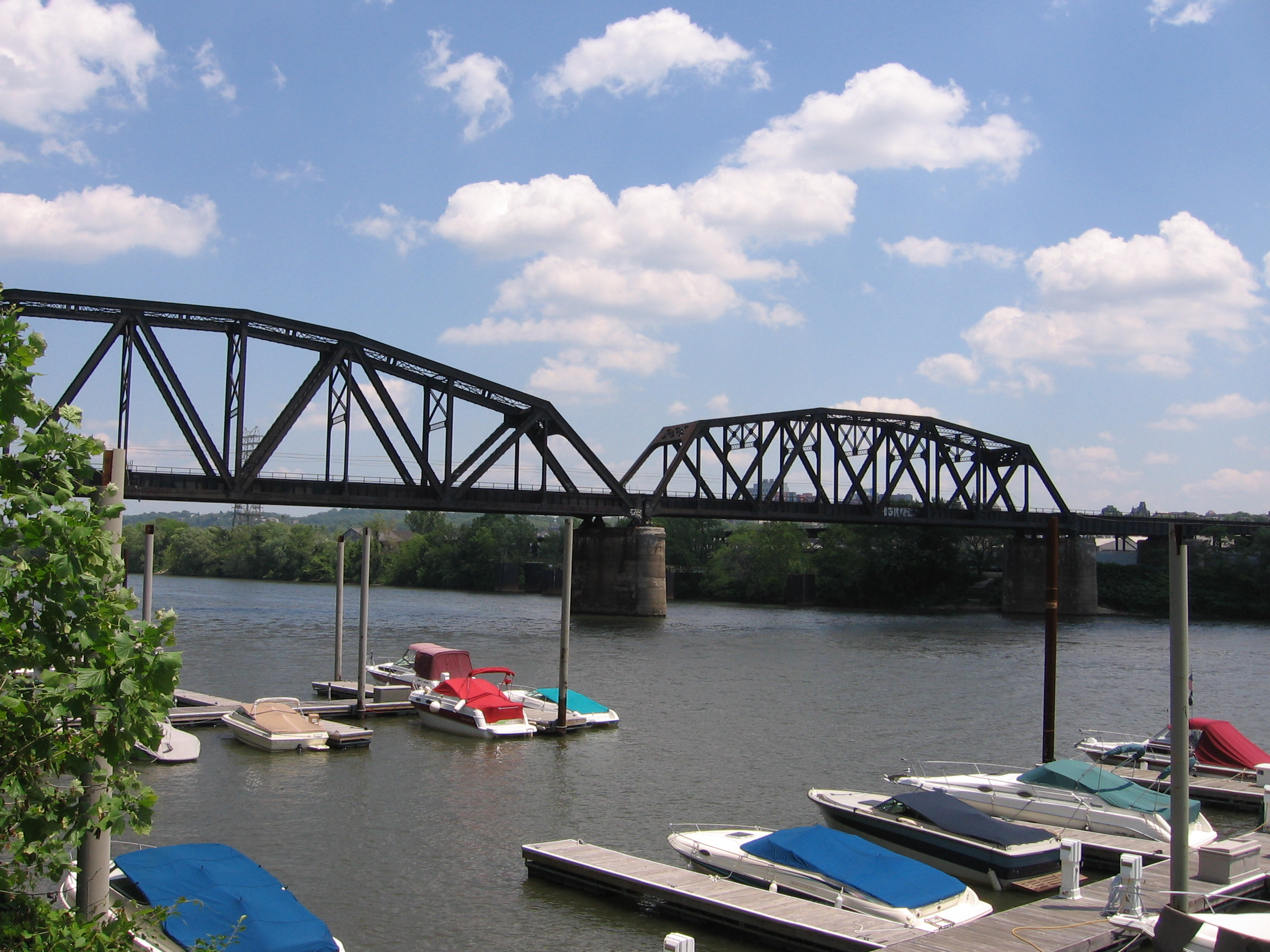
33rd Street Railroad Bridge

The Pittsburgh, New Castle and Lake Erie opened a line from Etna north to Zelienople in 1879. It became the Pittsburgh and Western Railroad that same year, and in 1880 it was extended north to Wurtemberg (near Ellwood City) and southwest from Etna to Allegheny (now part of Pittsburgh). It was soon extended north to New Castle, forming a line that includes today's P&W Subdivision from the 33rd Street Railroad Bridge to West Pittsburgh.

The Pittsburgh Junction Railroad built a line connecting the two railroads through the east side of Pittsburgh and over the 33rd Street Railroad Bridge in 1884. The B&O acquired all three lines by leases and mergers, and they later passed to CSX.

In 1934, the B&O began operating through trains via trackage rights over the Pittsburgh and Lake Erie Railroad (now the Pittsburgh Subdivision) between McKeesport and New Castle, leaving the P&W for local trains only. In the 1970s, the line between McKeesport and Rankin was abandoned in favor of the adjacent P&LE .

There was a connection to the Grant Street Station from Laughlin Junction near Greenfield, until the 1990s, when the station was removed and the connecting rail right-of-way was turned into the Eliza Furnace Trail.

In 2003, CSX sought the Surface Transportation Board's permission to abandon the line from Glenshaw north to Bakerstown, which had not seen local traffic for at least two years. A month later, the Allegheny Valley Railroad leased the piece from Bloomfield north to Glenshaw and acquired trackage rights from Bloomfield south to the W&P Subdivision, which it leased simultaneously. Almost immediately after that, the Buffalo and Pittsburgh Railroad leased the line from Glenshaw north to West Pittsburg. On May 15, 2019, the Allegheny Valley Railroad acquired the section of the P&W Subdivision that it had been leasing from CSX.

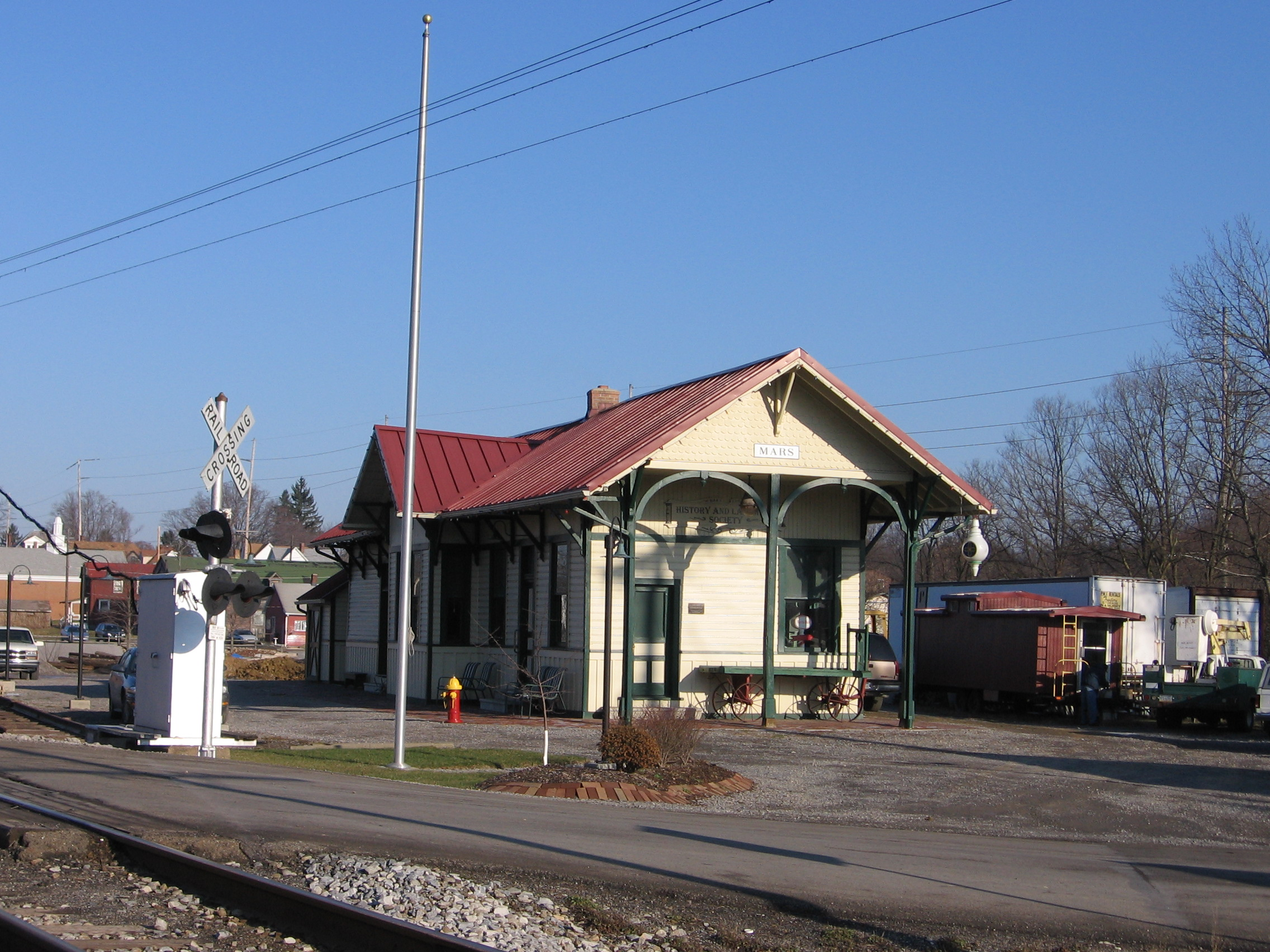
Mars Railroad Station

== See also ==
- Keystone Subdivision
- New Castle Terminal Subdivision
- Northern Subdivision (Pennsylvania)
- Pittsburgh and Western Railroad
- Pittsburgh Subdivision
- W&P Subdivision
