= Mount Oliver, Pennsylvania =

Borough in Pennsylvania, US

- Borough
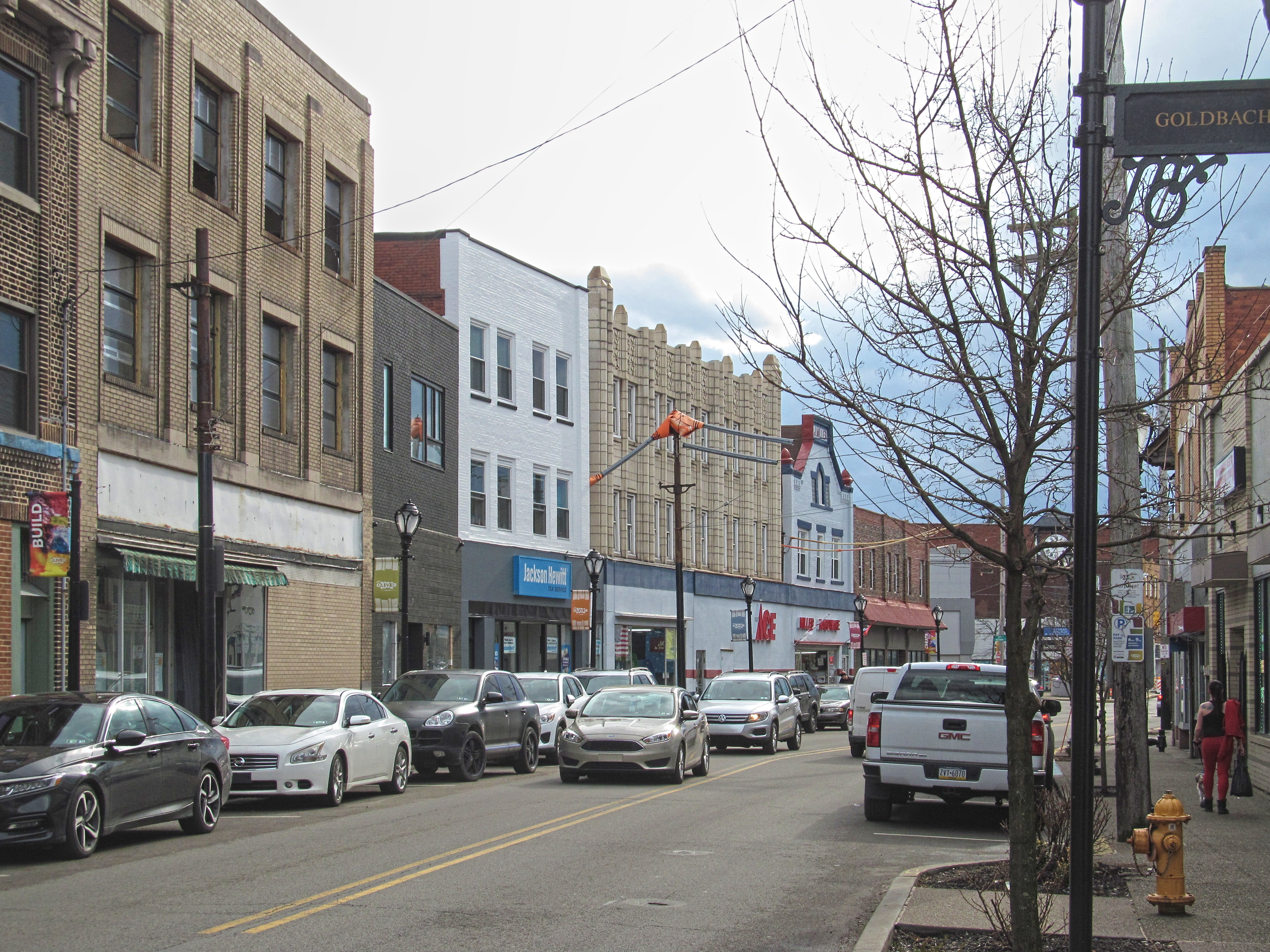
- Brownsville Road commercial district in Mount Oliver

- Flag Logo

- Location in Allegheny County and the U.S. state of Pennsylvania.
- Coordinates: 40°24′41″N 79°59′12″W
- Country: United States
- State: Pennsylvania
- County: Allegheny
- Settled: 1769
- Incorporated: November 9, 1892
- Named after: Oliver Ormsby

Area
  - Total: 0.34 sq mi (0.88 km^{2})
  - Land: 0.34 sq mi (0.88 km^{2})
  - Water: 0 sq mi (0.00 km^{2})

Population (2020)
  - Total: 3,394
  - Density: 9,997.7/sq mi (3,860.12/km^{2})
- Time zone: UTC-5 (Eastern (EST))
  - Summer (DST): UTC-4 (EDT)
- ZIP code: 15210
- Area code: 412
- FIPS code: 42-51744
- Website: mtoliver.com

Mount Oliver is a borough in Allegheny County, Pennsylvania, United States. The population was 3,394 at the 2020 census. It is a largely residential area situated atop a crest about 3 miles (5 km) west of the Monongahela River. The borough is surrounded entirely by the city of Pittsburgh, having resisted annexation attempts by the city.

== History ==
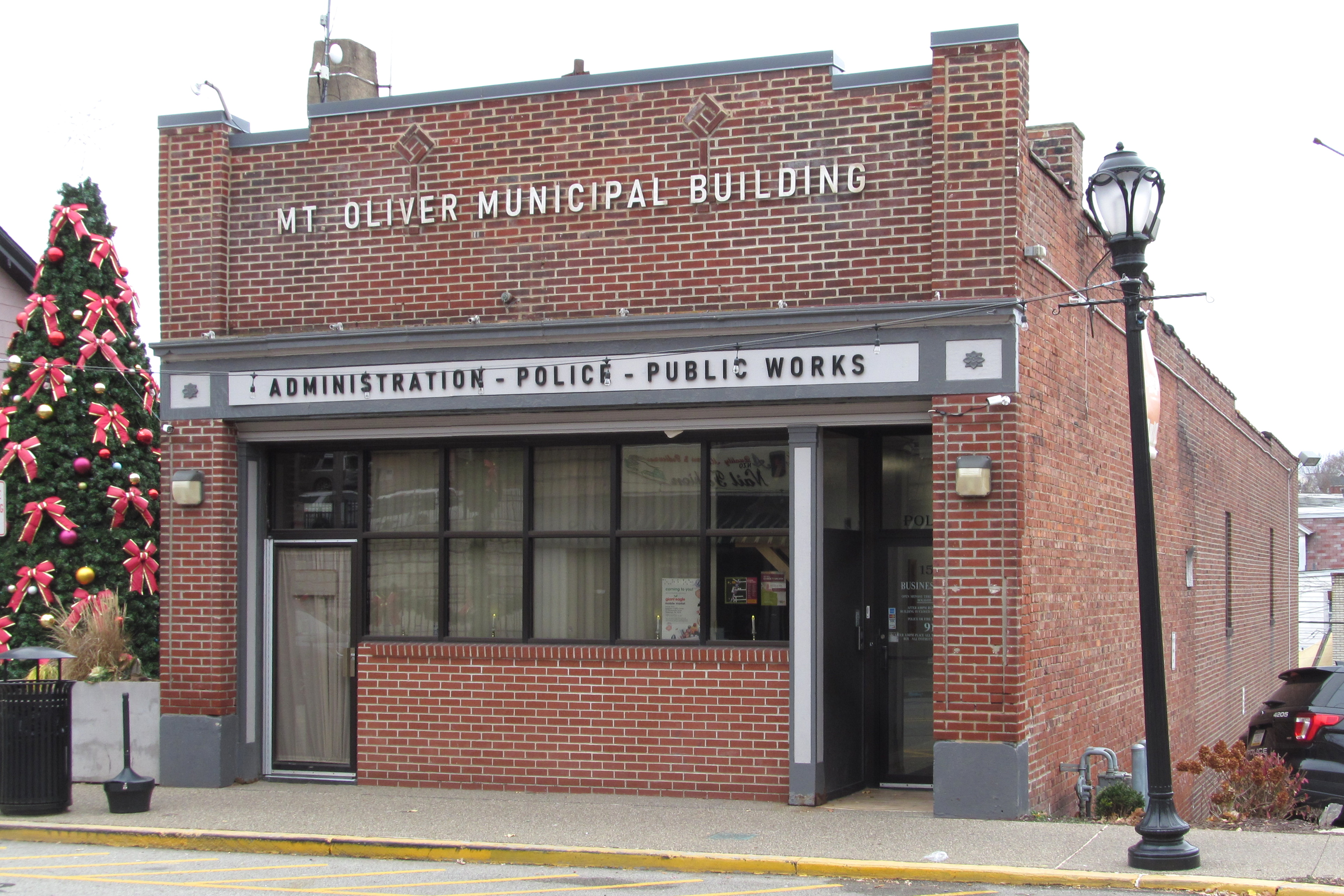
Municipal building

Mount Oliver was first settled by John Ormsby, an officer in the command of General Forbes, who was granted 249 acres of land along the banks of the Monongahela River. In 1788 Allegheny County was divided into townships, with Ormsby's plot being part of St. Clair Township. In 1800 Ormsby began selling parcels of land, while retaining rent and property taxes from residents. Ormsby named his growing settlement Mount Oliver, after his son, Oliver Ormsby. Later that year St. Clair Township would be divided with residents attempting to incorporate as a borough, however, the state ruled against the effort stating that the property owner quota was not sufficient to award incorporation, and Mount Oliver would become part of Lower St. Clair Township.

In 1872 Pittsburgh began expanding southward, annexing the boroughs of South Pittsburgh, Monongahela, Allentown, Lawrenceville, Temperanceville, Birmingham, Mt. Washington, West Pittsburgh, Pittsburgh Borough, East Birmingham, St. Clair Borough and Ormsby. Local residents began to feel threatened by this expansion, as well as feeling that Lower St. Clair Township was not properly dealing with their road improvements and public safety. As a result, in 1892 a petition circulated to incorporate Mount Oliver as a borough, which passed the courts on November 9, 1892.

In 1927 Pittsburgh began another expansion effort, annexing the boroughs of Knoxville and Carrick, completely surrounding Mount Oliver. The city of Pittsburgh attempted to force annexation through a lengthy legal battle, however, the borough ultimately prevailed due to its population being too high to annex the municipality without a referendum approved by its residents.

To this day residents of Mount Oliver fiercely defend their independence from Pittsburgh, seeing it as a point of local pride, which is helped by how approachable the local government is, and the rapid allocation of municipal services. However, there has been a noted decline from the 1980s, when the Borough was a local commercial hub.

== Geography ==
Mount Oliver is located at 40°24′41″N 79°59′12″W (40.411319, −79.986571). According to the U.S. Census Bureau, the borough has a total area of 0.3 square miles (0.9 km^{2}), all land.

=== Surrounding neighborhoods ===
Mount Oliver is completely surrounded by six Pittsburgh neighborhoods, including the South Side Slopes to the north, Arlington to the northeast, Mt. Oliver to the southeast, Carrick to the south, Knoxville to the west, and Allentown in the northwest corner.

Presidential election results
Year	Republican	Democratic	Third parties
2020	29% 391	69% 924	1% 17
2016	26% 342	72% 946	2% 21
2012	22% 298	77% 1,044	1% 18

== Demographics ==
Historical population
Census	Pop.	Note	%±
1880	1,883		—
1900	2,295		—
1910	4,241		84.8%
1920	5,575		31.5%
1930	7,071		26.8%
1940	6,981		−1.3%
1950	6,646		−4.8%
1960	5,980		−10.0%
1970	5,509		−7.9%
1980	4,576		−16.9%
1990	4,160		−9.1%
2000	3,970		−4.6%
2010	3,403		−14.3%
2020	3,394		−0.3%

=== 2020 census ===
As of the 2020 census, Mount Oliver had a population of 3,394. The median age was 35.4 years. 23.1% of residents were under the age of 18 and 13.3% of residents were 65 years of age or older. For every 100 females there were 95.4 males, and for every 100 females age 18 and over there were 91.1 males age 18 and over.

100.0% of residents lived in urban areas, while 0.0% lived in rural areas.

There were 1,475 households in Mount Oliver, of which 27.9% had children under the age of 18 living in them. Of all households, 20.8% were married-couple households, 29.1% were households with a male householder and no spouse or partner present, and 41.5% were households with a female householder and no spouse or partner present. About 38.8% of all households were made up of individuals and 10.2% had someone living alone who was 65 years of age or older.

There were 1,765 housing units, of which 16.4% were vacant. The homeowner vacancy rate was 1.9% and the rental vacancy rate was 9.4%.

Racial composition as of the 2020 census
Race	Number	Percent
White	1,599	47.1%
Black or African American	1,273	37.5%
American Indian and Alaska Native	12	0.4%
Asian	136	4.0%
Native Hawaiian and Other Pacific Islander	0	0.0%
Some other race	80	2.4%
Two or more races	294	8.7%
Hispanic or Latino (of any race)	184	5.4%

=== 2000 census ===
As of the 2000 census, there were 3,970 people, 1,681 households, and 983 families residing in the borough. The population density was 11,720.0 inhabitants per square mile (4,525.1/km^{2}). There were 1,864 housing units at an average density of 5,502.8 per square mile (2,124.6/km^{2}). The racial makeup of the borough was 83.75% White, 11.74% African American, 0.23% Native American, 1.64% Asian, 0.03% Pacific Islander, 0.68% from other races, and 1.94% from two or more races. Hispanic or Latino of any race were 1.08% of the population.

There were 1,681 households, out of which 28.2% had children under the age of 18 living with them, 33.8% were married couples living together, 18.3% had a female householder with no husband present, and 41.5% were non-families. 34.0% of all households were made up of individuals, and 12.4% had someone living alone who was 65 years of age or older. The average household size was 2.36 and the average family size was 3.04.

In the borough the population was spread out, with 24.0% under the age of 18, 10.0% from 18 to 24, 30.0% from 25 to 44, 21.9% from 45 to 64, and 14.1% who were 65 years of age or older. The median age was 36 years. For every 100 females, there were 91.3 males. For every 100 females age 18 and over, there were 85.8 males.

The median income for a household in the borough was $27,990, and the median income for a family was $32,388. Males had a median income of $30,394 versus $25,255 for females. The per capita income for the borough was $15,104. About 14.7% of families and 19.3% of the population were below the poverty line, including 34.5% of those under age 18 and 12.2% of those age 65 or over.

== Taxation ==
Residents of Mount Oliver Borough pay a 2% tax on earned income to the Pittsburgh Public Schools district and 1% tax on earned income to the Borough of Mount Oliver.

== Education ==
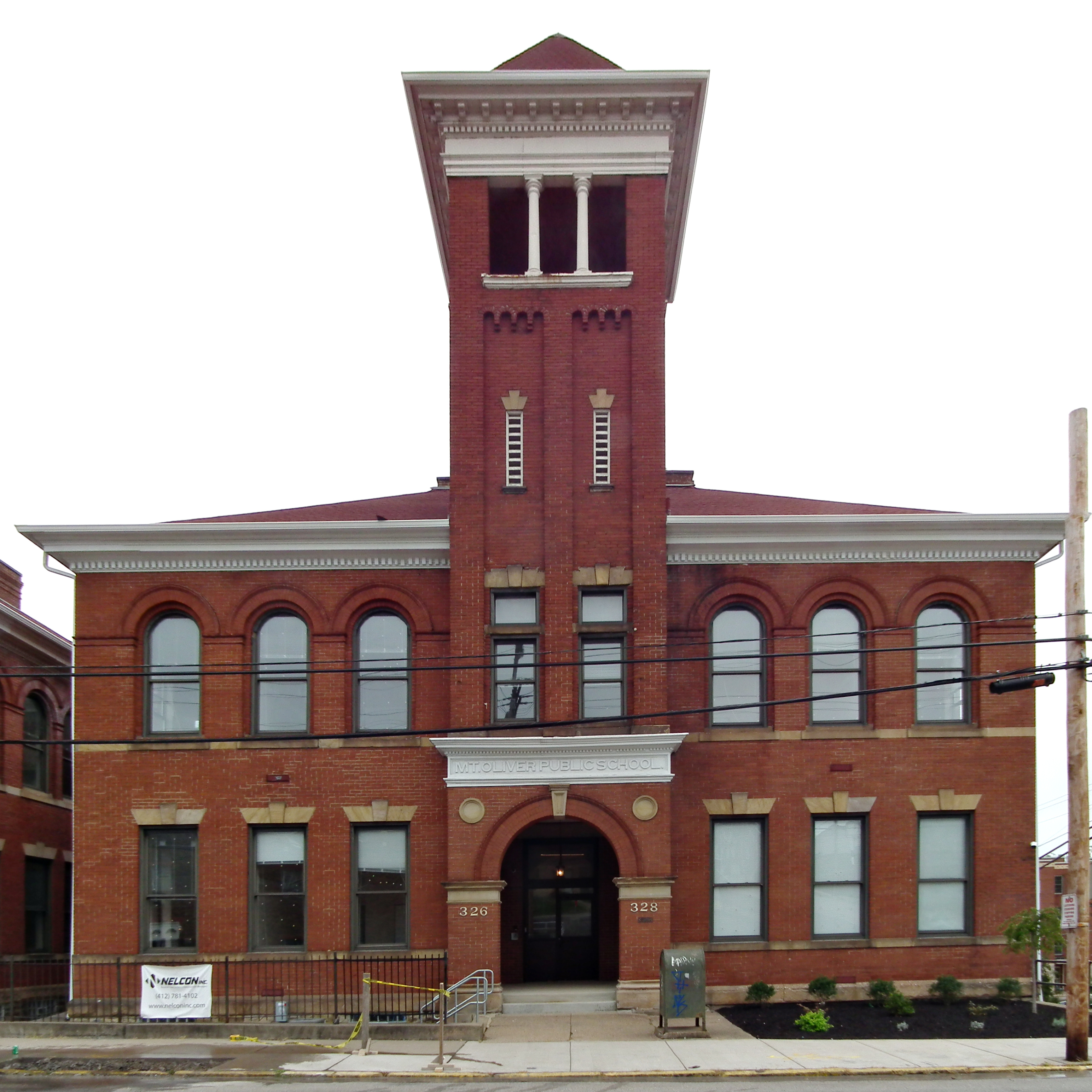
The former Mount Oliver Public School

The school district is Pittsburgh Public Schools. The zoned K-8 school is Arlington School, while Carrick High School is the zoned high school.

Mount Oliver School opened circa 1890. The school district closed it in June 1980, and it planned to hand the school over to the Mount Oliver municipal government, which planned to use the building for office space and community center purposes.
