= Chris Zurawsky =

Christopher Zurawsky
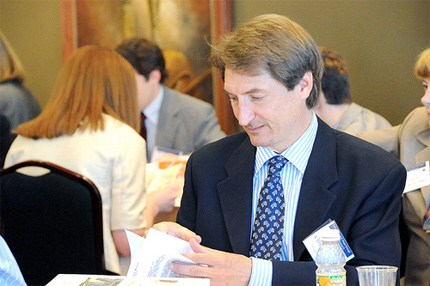
- Born: May 18, 1962 (age 64)
- Education: University of Pittsburgh
- Political party: Democratic
- Website: Zurawsky For Council

Christopher Zurawsky (born May 18, 1962) is a former political candidate from Pittsburgh, Pennsylvania. In 2011 he ran for the 5th District seat of the Pittsburgh City Council, which includes Squirrel Hill, Greenfield, Hazelwood, Lincoln Place, Swisshelm Park, Regent Square, Glen Hazel, Hays, and New Homestead. He has received endorsements from the Pittsburgh 14th Ward Independent Democratic Club, Democracy For America, and the Gertrude Stein Club. These organizations serve to educate voters by endorsing progressive candidates who promote democracy and civil rights.

Zurawsky currently serves on the executive committee of the 14th Ward of the Allegheny County Democratic Committee and has been a county committee member since 2002. Zurawsky has been involved in the democratic process in the East End of Pittsburgh, and through his service, he has been an advocate for Pittsburgh voters.

Zurawsky grew up in Brentwood, Pennsylvania, and graduated from St. Sylvester Grade School and Brentwood High School. He received his Bachelors in English Writing from the University of Pittsburgh, and he holds a Master of Science in Journalism from Columbia University and a Master of Science in Public Policy and Management from the University of Pittsburgh.

Zurawsky retired in 2026 after 17 years as communications director for the Association of American Cancer Institutes. He has worked as a journalist for the New Pittsburgh Courier, the McKeesport Daily News, The Philadelphia Inquirer, and the Pittsburgh Tribune-Review. He has taught Journalism at the University of Pittsburgh, Point Park University, and the University of Newcastle, Australia.

Chris’ wife is a psychiatrist who grew up in Squirrel Hill and is a Taylor Allderdice High School graduate. They have two sons: Nicholas is a University of Pittsburgh graduate and a mechanical engineer at Simple Origin, an East Liberty (Pittsburgh)-based manufacturer of precision tools for cryo-EM and TEM workflows; Peter is a graduate of OCAD University (Ontario College of Art and Design), in Toronto. The family has owned a home in Squirrel Hill since 1999.

Chris is a board member of Friends of Schenley Park and coordinates a summer singles tennis league for the Schenley Park Tennis Association. He was formerly on the board of Homes of Hope – U.S., a non-profit founded by author Paul Wilkes that works with the Salesian Sisters of Don Bosco, in southern India, to care for poor orphaned children.
