= St. George Church (Pittsburgh) =

St. George Catholic Church
- St. John Vianney Catholic Church
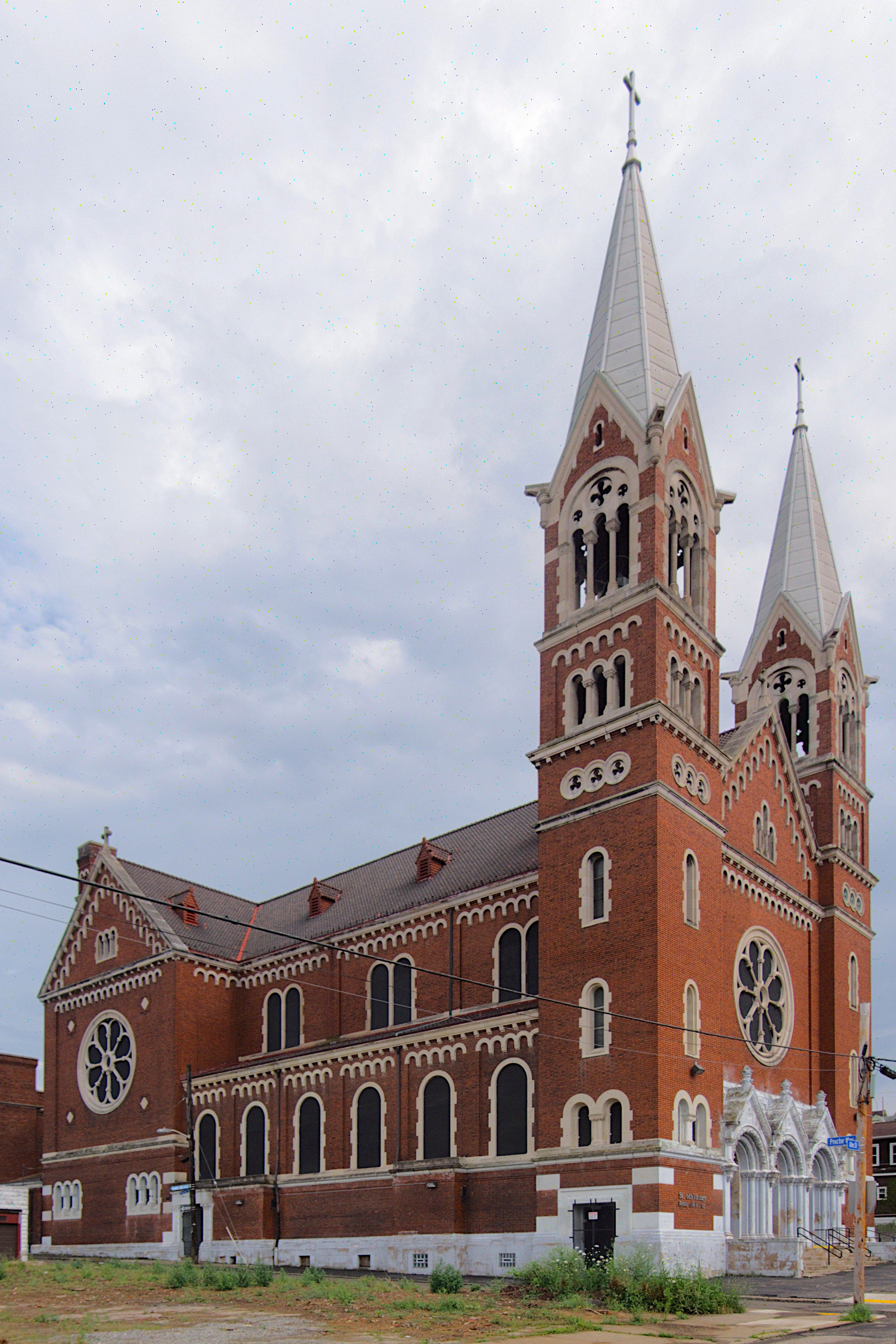
- St. George Catholic Church in 2019
- St. George Catholic Church
- 40°25′13.07″N 79°59′35.46″W
- Address: 823 Climax Street, Allentown, Pittsburgh, Pennsylvania
- Country: United States
- Denomination: Catholic

History
- Status: Parish church

Architecture
- Architect: Herman J. Lang
- Style: German Romanesque, Rundbogenstil
- Years built: 1910–1912
- Closed: 2016

Administration
- Diocese: Roman Catholic Diocese of Pittsburgh

St. George Church, also known as St. John Vianney Church, is a former Roman Catholic parish church in the Allentown neighborhood of Pittsburgh, Pennsylvania. The church was designed by Herman J. Lang in the German Romanesque and Rundbogenstil architectural styles, was built in 1910–1912, and today functions as a community space. The church was nominated in January 2016 to become a City Historic Landmark by Preservation Pittsburgh, but the nomination was placed on hold pending an appeal of the closure of the church.

== History ==
The St. George Parish was formed as one of several outgrowths of the St. Michael Parish on the Southside in 1886. St. Michael was one of the oldest German Catholic parishes located in Allegheny County and over five parishes grew from it. The new parish needed a location and they chose one in the Pittsburgh neighborhood of Allentown. Allentown was central to German-American immigrant life in Pittsburgh, and at certain points Germans were among the largest ethnic groups to settle in the area. In the late 19th century the area was also open and undeveloped, becoming home to a more well off sect of businessmen and artisans. The area was annexed into the City of Pittsburgh in 1872, just shortly before the formation of St. George Parish.

Immediately after the Parish's formation they purchased a plot of land directly at the center of Allentown for $7 thousand. The construction of the first St. George's church took place in September of that same year of inception. In the period of 1886 to 1910 the church's congregation grew significantly. This growth required and allowed the church to buy more land, to build a parochial school, to establish a convent, and to build a rectory.

By 1910 it was clear that the original church building was insufficient for the new, larger congregation's needs, and the decision to build a new church was made. The parish hired Herman J. Lang, of the firm Edmund B. Lang & Brother, as their architect. His selection was significant due to his German heritage. German immigrants tended to huddle in strong ethnic communities and neighborhoods so that they could preserve their customs and traditions. Churches were considered to be the focal point of these German communities, and they felt as though Protestants did not understand their needs. They thus decided to choose architects who practiced their religion and understood their customs, rather than Irish, American, or English-born designers. Lang's selection, despite his being relatively unknown at the time, is representative of this trend.

The construction for the new church began in 1910 and was formally completed in July 1912. In 1994, due to population loss, the Diocese of Pittsburgh merged St. George with three other parishes—St. Canice in Knoxville, St. Henry in Arlington, and St. Joseph in Mount Oliver—to form the new St. John Vianney parish. At first, all four churches remained open, but the other three were closed in 2005. As the sole parish church, St. George was rededicated as St. John Vianney Church on September 3, 2005. However, the population continued to decline, and the church and parish were closed after the final Mass on April 3, 2016. The church now serves as a community space.

== Architecture ==
Architect Herman Lang designed the church in the German Romanesque architectural style, an American derivative of the Rundbogenstil style. German emigrants brought the style to popularity within the United States as Greek Revival, Italianate, and other popular styles of the time were not designed for German ethnic expression. The former St. George Church exemplifies this trend well with its grand basilica resembling German cathedrals in Europe. The stained glass windows also served as beacons for the church's identity in addition to its other German architectural styling. The church's architecture was meant to display its German connections, and it did this effectively.

== Stained glass windows ==
The nave of St. George Church contains two notable Munich-style stained glass windows created by Leo Thomas for the George Boos Studio during the church's construction in 1911–12. One of the windows depicts Saint George and the Dragon, while the other represents Tu Es Petrus, the "moment in Catholic liturgy when Jesus charges St. Peter to be the rock on which his church would be founded."

The events that led to the creation of these stained glass windows dates back to King Ludwig I's reign over Bavaria from 1786 to 1868. It was Ludwig's desire to transform his capital city, Munich, into a hub for German art and culture. To accomplish his goals he subsidized large sectors of the arts, spending money on a multitude of artistic ventures. One of the projects Ludwig oversaw was the revival of mural and glass painting. Josef Gabriel Meyer took advantage of this funding, and in 1847 he created Meyer & Co., which specialized in making ecclesiastical furnishings. Meyer & Co. was very successful in Bavaria, and this led to Franz Xavier Zettler, Josef Meyer's son-in-law, to found Meyer & Co.'s glass studio in 1860. He found his own studio in 1870, and worked primarily off commissions from the Catholic Church and the crown, until he expanded his sales to the United States in the late 19th century. The designer George Boos got his start in the industry working for Meyer & Co. whilst in Bavaria. In 1880 Boos founded his own art glass studio, George Boos Studio, where he was eventually joined by his English nephew, Leo Thomas. During his work with George Boos, Thomas designed and made the two stained glass windows in 1911–1912, that would go on to be installed in St. George Church once its construction finished. The windows were nominated in January 2016 to become a City Historic Landmark by Preservation Pittsburgh.

The two windows are examples of the Munich Style of art glass. The work of Leo Thomas is distinguished from others due to the process involved in creating the illusion of realism and depth on both sides of the glass. The work was incredibly labor-intensive and required skilled designers in order to fuse the paint to both sides. It is because of this difficult process, and the level of expertise needed to perfect the technique, that these pieces are incredibly rare. The designs of Thomas's works also help him stand out from other creators. Through his travels in Europe, Thomas encountered numerous artworks that inspired his designs. He would incorporate elements of modern design, developments in German Secessionist art, and developments in Viennese Secessionist art into his works. The Tu Es Petrus and St. George and the Dragon windows included these design elements amongst others.
