= South Side Slopes =

- Neighborhood of Pittsburgh
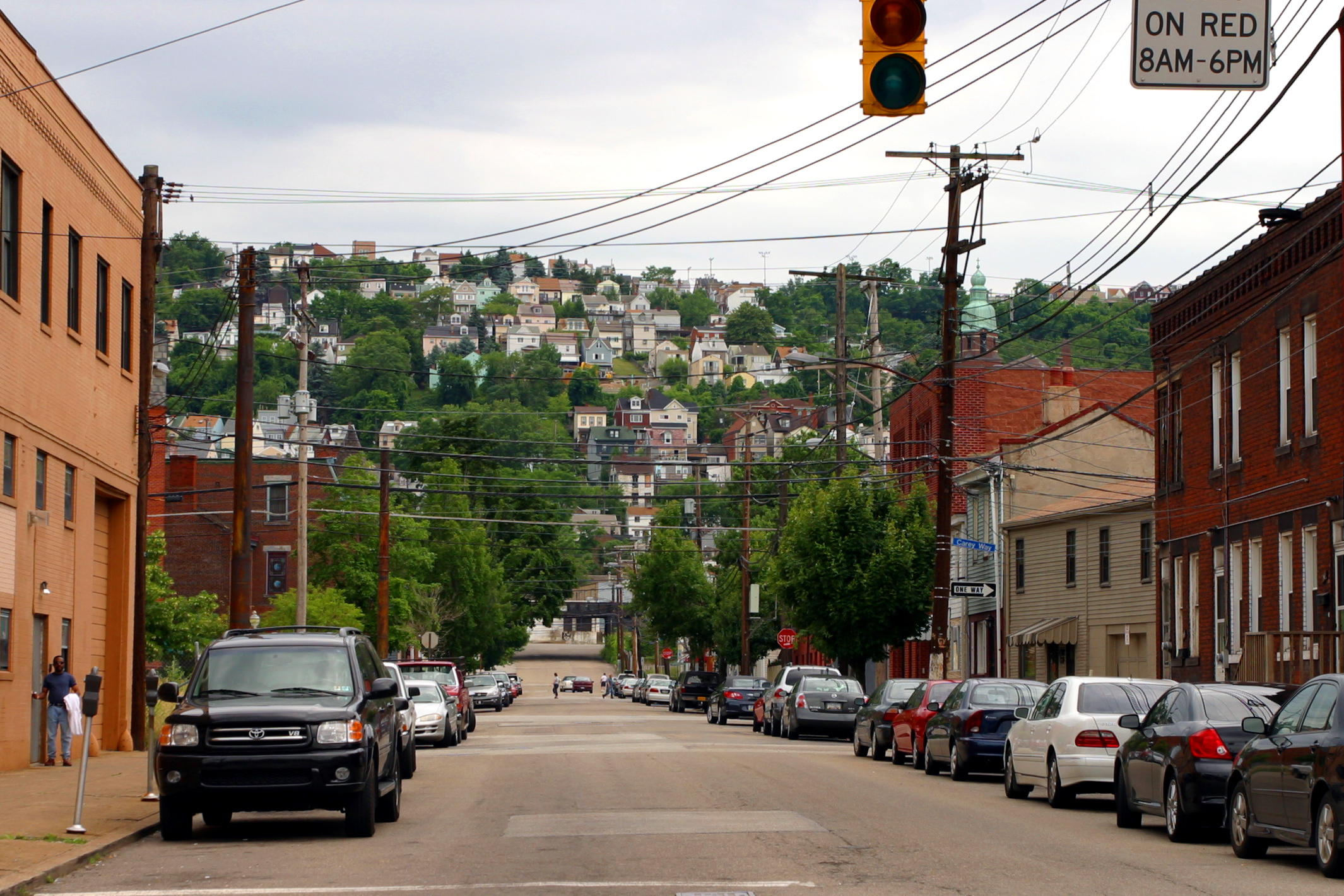
- South Side Slopes from E. Carson Street in South Side Flats

- Coordinates: 40.42°N 79.97°W
- Country: United States
- State: Pennsylvania
- County: Allegheny County
- City: Pittsburgh

Area
  - Total: 0.716 sq mi (1.85 km^{2})

Population (2010)
  - Total: 4,423
  - Density: 6,180/sq mi (2,390/km^{2})

South Side Slopes is a neighborhood in the South Side area of Pittsburgh, Pennsylvania, United States. The neighborhood comprises the hills from the South Side Flats neighborhood along the Monongahela River from the Liberty Bridge (west) to beyond Josephine Street (east).

In many parts of the South Side Slopes, homes offer panoramic views of the city skyline that span the distance from beyond McKees Rocks, to Homestead. Many homes are perched well above the city skyline. This neighborhood provides access to the South Side Flats by various means, including the many public staircases.

Every autumn the South Side Slopes Neighborhood Association (SSSNA) hosts its annual "StepTrek", where participants travel over the various public step streets. Pittsburgh, like many cities in the United States built on hillsides, classifies public staircases as streets. The hills being steep, staircases allowed access to the different parts of the slopes neighborhood. The SSSNA hopes to maintain the staircases as a legacy of its history as a mining town.

The Mission Street steps between Oakley Street and Barry Street in addition to the top of Yard Way off Pius St. offer views of the South Side Flats neighborhood and downtown Pittsburgh. These public staircases are sometimes called paper streets, being pedestrian streets shown on city maps but not accessible by vehicles.

The neighborhood has representation on the Pittsburgh City Council by the council member for District 3 (Central South Neighborhoods). The Pittsburgh Bureau of Fire houses 24 Engine and 24 Truck on the South Side. It is located on Mary Street just off of Carson Street. The South Side Slopes area is also served by Engine Co 22 which is located in the neighborhood on Arlington Avenue adjoining South Side Park.

South Side Park is a city park with hiking trails, a small orchard patch and views of the Pittsburgh skyline. It is home to many species of birds, small animals and deer. It contains a small wetlands area, complete with cattails and many species of wildlife. Black locust trees form a mature canopy over the park. It also includes a community garden at the former Bandi Schaum baseball field on the lower plateau off Mission Street across from the Mission Street water pumping station.

A cor-ten sculpture representing the neighborhood's topography and buildings is on display in the garden of Paul of the Cross Monastery.

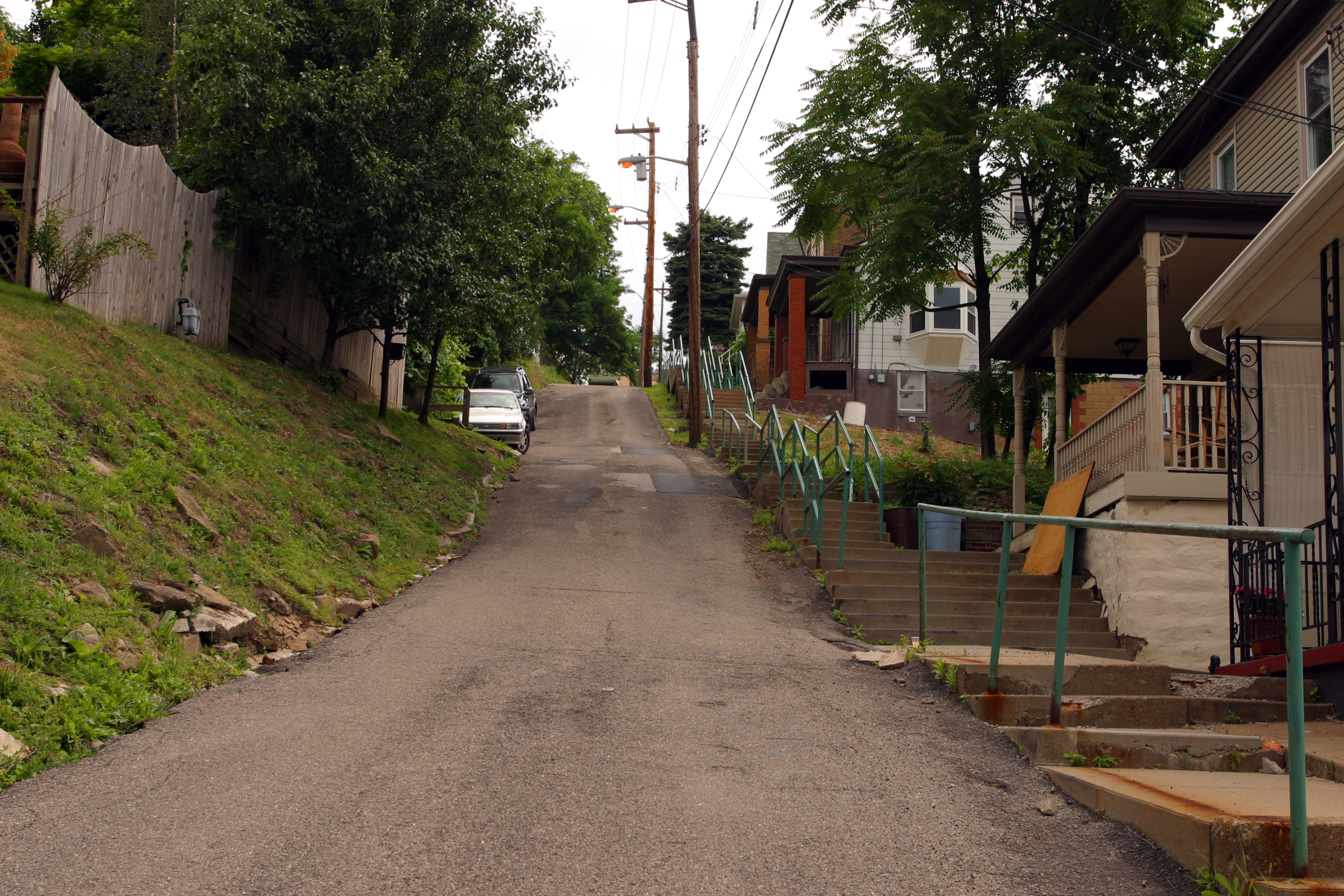
One of the many steep streets in the South Side Slopes, with a staircase for a sidewalk

== History ==
In 1763, King George III of Great Britain granted John Ormsby, a soldier in the French and Indian War as well as the alleged first settler of Pittsburgh, 2,400 acres of land along the southern banks of the Monongahela River for his service in the capture of Fort Duquesne. Ormsby divided the land into four boroughs – South Pittsburgh, Birmingham, Ormsby, and East Birmingham, which is present day South Side Slopes.

South Side expanded and grew in order to keep up with Pittsburgh's industrial boom, adopting the nickname "Workshop of the World". The industry of glass-making was predominant in the early 1800s, and later the banks of the Monongahela River became home to the iron and steel operations run by the company J&L Steel.

J&L (the Jones and Laughlin Steel Company) eventually became South Side's largest employer, as by 1910 it employed 15,000 workers. The majority of these workers came as immigrants from European nations such as Germany, Ireland, Poland, Lithuania, Ukraine, and the Slavic nations and settled into homes in the present day South Side Slopes. The houses built for them were traditionally one room wide, two rooms deep, and up to four stories high. The houses are built into the hillside with narrow walkways between them. Most of the structures and houses in both South Side Slopes are balloon-framed, whereas many of those on the South Side Flats were built from brick, in a rectangular fashion. Many of them were ornamented in the popular style of the 1900s – Romanesque, Italianate and Second Empire. They are fashioned in a classical Victorian style row home way with carved doorways, cornices, corbelling, cast iron ornaments and geometric slate patterns. The Slopes is rich in culture as many immigrants wanted to preserve their native cultures and languages; so they built many bars and churches, many of which still exist today.

== Geography ==
South Side Slopes is located at 40.42 N and 79.97 W. The area South Side Slopes covers is approximately 0.716 square miles (1.85 km^{2}) or 460.632 acres. It is made up of many slopes with elevations ranging from 791 feet (241 m) to 1,174 feet (358 m). There are some areas that are too steep for automobile navigation so the numerous staircases located throughout South Side Slopes serve as the "streets". Approximately 70 sets of staircases have been found in the neighborhood.

South Side Slopes is part of District 3 in Allegheny County. 18th Street, Arlington Avenue, and Josephine Street are three of the main roads that run through the neighborhood. It is approximately 0.8 miles (1.3 km) from the Monongahela River and the historic Birmingham Bridge. The Slopes neighborhood is also close to the diverse East Carson Street and the SouthSide Works shopping center.

South Side Slopes has an overall cold climate, meaning it has about 5,400 heating degree days and fewer than 9,000 heating degree days based on a temperature of 65 degrees Fahrenheit. It can experience temperatures that range from 90 degrees Fahrenheit to negative 10 degrees Fahrenheit. The area also accumulates an average of 30 to 40 inches of precipitation per year. Allegheny County can also get anywhere from zero to twenty inches of snow per month during the months of December, January, February, and March.

== Surrounding neighborhoods ==
South Side Slopes has seven borders, six with Pittsburgh neighborhoods including the South Side Flats to the north, Arlington Heights to the southeast, Arlington to the south, Allentown to the west and northwest, and South Shore and Mt. Washington to the northwest. The other border is with the borough of Mt. Oliver to the southwest.

== Demographics ==
According to the 2010 census, there were 5,007 people living in the neighborhood and 2,580 total housing units within its boundaries. The racial makeup of the neighborhood was 88.54% White, 7.14% African American, 0.95% Asian, 1.06% from other races, and 2.31% from two or more races. Hispanics and Latinos of any race were 2.1% of the population.

Out of the total number of housing units, 83.5% were occupied. The owner occupancy percentage is 61.2%. There were 12.23% of households with those under the age of 18 and 18.34% with those over the age of 60.

The population was generally decreasing with 15,083 in 1940; 12,998 in 1950; 10,842 in 1960; 9,739 in 1970; 7,020 in 1980; 5,007 in 2000.

== Gallery ==
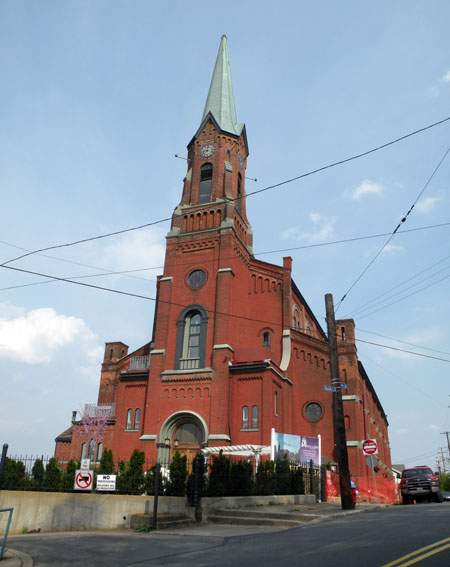
Former Saint Michael's Roman Catholic Church, built from 1855 to 1860, at 1 Pius Street

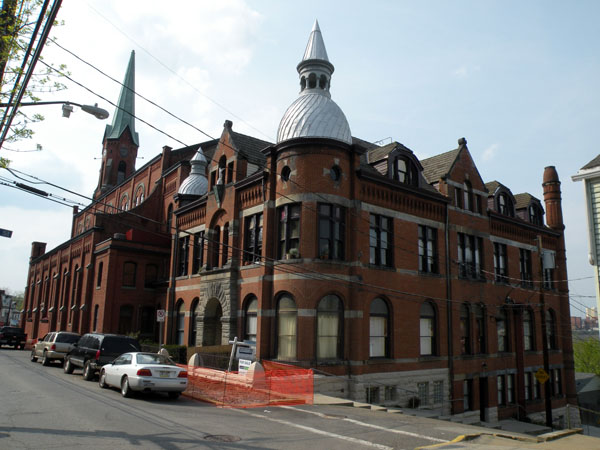
Former Saint Michael's Roman Catholic Church Rectory, built 1890, at 21 Pius Street

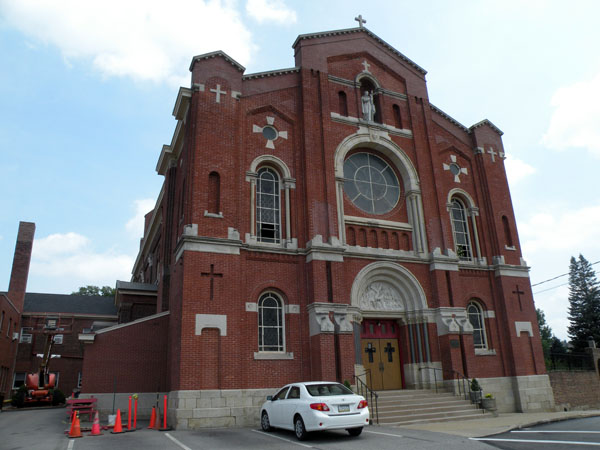
St. Paul of the Cross Monastery, built in 1854 and later, at 143 Monastery Street

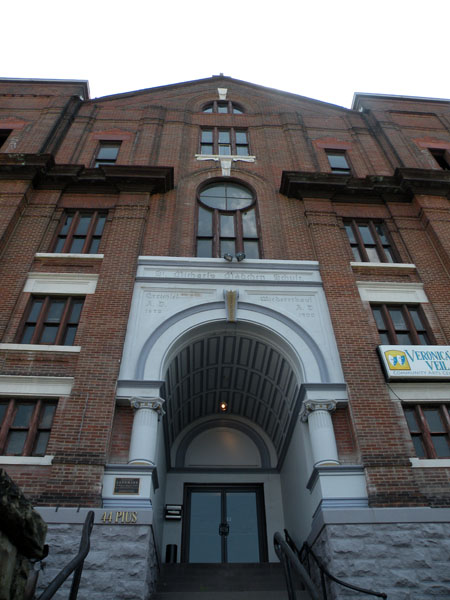
Veronica's Veil Community Arts Center (formerly St. Michael's Mädchen Schule and then South Side Catholic High School: West Building), built circa 1900, at 44 Pius Street

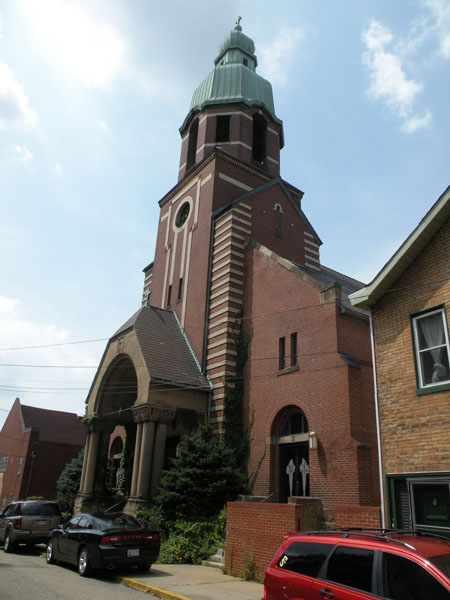
St. Josaphat's Roman Catholic Church, built between 1909 and 1916, at 2301 Mission Street

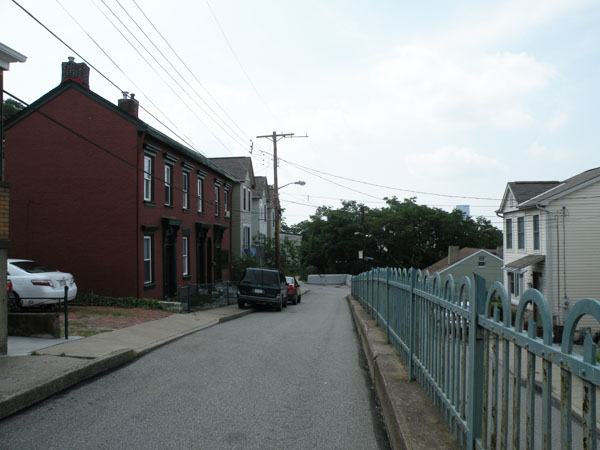
Shelly/Stella Street terracing, built in the 1930s. This picture was taken on Shelly Street.

== See also ==
- List of Pittsburgh neighborhoods
- History of Pittsburgh's South Side
