= West Liberty, Allegheny County, Pennsylvania =

West Liberty Borough
- Former Borough
- Location within the state of Pennsylvania
- Coordinates: 40°24′08″N 80°00′52″W
- Country: United States
- State: Pennsylvania
- County: Allegheny
- Time zone: UTC-5 (Eastern (EST))
  - Summer (DST): UTC-4 (EDT)

West Liberty Borough was a borough in Allegheny County, Pennsylvania, United States from 1876 to 1909. West Liberty Borough was incorporated on March 7, 1876 from the western part of Lower St. Clair Township. The borough was a small village along the Pittsburgh and Washington Road near Mount Washington. West Liberty Borough was absorbed by the city of Pittsburgh in 1908. It is today the Brookline neighborhood, Bon Air neighborhood, and part of the Beechview neighborhood.
