= Baldwin-Whitehall School District =

School district in Pennsylvania

- Map of Allegheny County school districts

Address
- 4900 Curry Road Pittsburgh, Allegheny County, Pennsylvania, 15236-1817; United States

District information
- Type: Public
- Motto: "Traditional Values, Quality Education, and a World of Opportunities"

Students and staff
- District mascot: The Fighting Highlanders
- Colors: Purple and White

Other information
- Website: http://www.bwschools.net/

The Baldwin-Whitehall School District is a large, suburban, public school district which serves the boroughs of Baldwin and Whitehall and Baldwin Township in Pennsylvania, as well as a portion of the Hays neighborhood of Pittsburgh, Pennsylvania. Baldwin-Whitehall School District encompasses approximately 10 square miles (26 km^{2}). According to 2000 federal census data, it served a resident population of 36,687 people. By 2010, the district's population declined to 35,731 people. In 2009, Baldwin-Whitehall School District residents' per capita income was $21,872 a year, while the median family income was $53,196. In the Commonwealth, the median family income was $49,501 and the United States median family income was $49,445, in 2010.

== Extracurriculars ==
The district offers a variety of clubs, activities, and sports.

=== Sports ===
The district funds:

Boys

- Baseball - AAAA
- Basketball- AAAA
- Bowling - AAAA
- Cross Country - AA
- Football - AAAA
- Golf - AAA
- Indoor Track and Field - AAAA
- Lacrosse - AAAA
- Soccer - AAA
- Swimming and Diving - AAA
- Tennis - AAA
- Track and Field - AAA
- Volleyball - AAA
- Water Polo - AAAA
- Wrestling - AAA

Girls

- Basketball - AAAA
- Bowling - AAAA
- Cheer - AAA
- Cross Country - AAA
- Gymnastics - AAAA
- Indoor Track and Field - AAAA
- Lacrosse - AAAA
- Soccer (Fall) - AAA
- Softball - AAAA
- Swimming and Diving - AAA
- Girls' Tennis - AAA
- Track and Field - AAA
- Volleyball - AAA
- Water Polo - AAAA

Harrison Middle School Sports

Boys

- Baseball
- Basketball
- Cross Country
- Football
- Soccer
- Swimming and Diving
- Track and Field
- Volleyball
- Wrestling

Girls

- Basketball
- Cross Country
- Soccer (Fall)
- Softball
- Swimming and Diving
- Track and Field
- Volleyball

According to PIAA directory July 2012
