= Baldwin Township, Pennsylvania =

Township in Pennsylvania, US

- Township
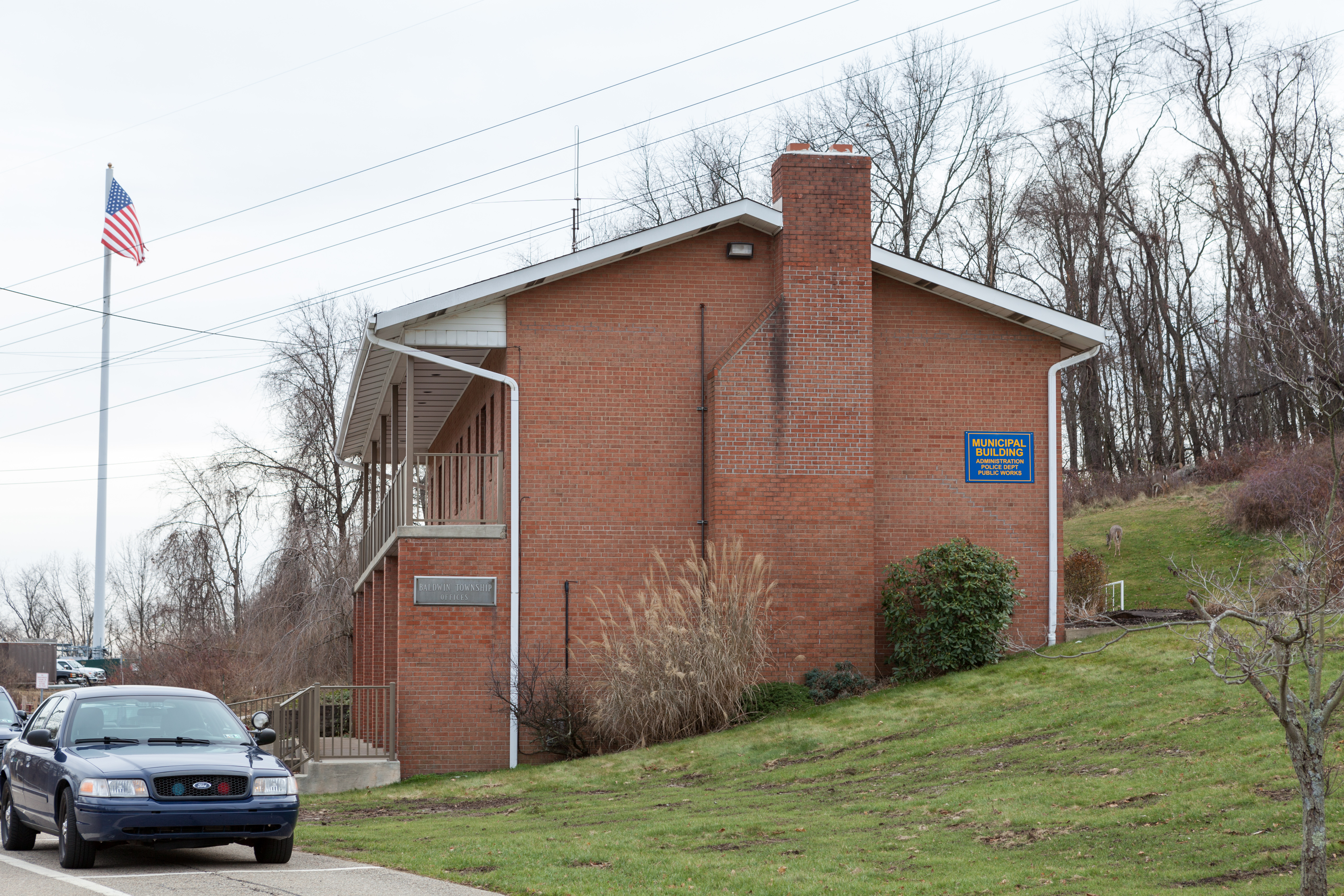
- The Baldwin Township municipal building

- Seal
- Etymology: Henry Baldwin
- Location in Allegheny County and state of Pennsylvania

- Location of Pennsylvania in the United States
- Coordinates: 40°22′50″N 80°00′59″W
- Country: United States
- State: Pennsylvania
- County: Allegheny
- Settled: c. 1780
- Incorporated: February 24, 1844

Government
  - President of Board: Nick Pellegrino (R)

Area
  - Total: 0.51 sq mi (1.31 km^{2})
  - Land: 0.51 sq mi (1.31 km^{2})
  - Water: 0 sq mi (0.00 km^{2})
- Elevation: 1,171 ft (357 m)

Population (2020)
  - Total: 1,984
  - Estimate (2022): 1,936
  - Density: 3,850.1/sq mi (1,486.54/km^{2})
- Time zone: UTC-5 (EST)
  - Summer (DST): UTC-4 (EDT)
- ZIP code: 15234
- Area code: 412
- FIPS code: 42-003-03932
- School District: Baldwin-Whitehall
- Website: baldwintownship.com

Baldwin Township is a township in Allegheny County, Pennsylvania, United States. The population was 1,984 at the 2020 census, a decrease from the figure of 1,992 tabulated in 2010.

== Geography ==
According to the United States Census Bureau, the township has a total area of 0.5 square miles (1.3 km^{2}), all land. Its average elevation is 1,171 feet (357 m) above sea level.

== Surrounding communities ==
Baldwin Township has four borders, including the Pittsburgh neighborhoods of Brookline to the north and Overbrook to the northeast and southeast. The other two borders are with Castle Shannon to the south and southwest and Mt. Lebanon to the west.

== History ==
The area that would become Baldwin Township was originally settled around 1780. The Allegheny County Court of Quarter Sessions established Baldwin Township on February 24, 1844, from Upper St. Clair, Lower St. Clair, Jefferson, and Mifflin townships. The area was named for Henry Baldwin, a Pittsburgh lawyer who served as an Associate Justice of the United States Supreme Court from 1830 until his death in 1844.

Baldwin Township was originally 10,550 acres (42.7 km^{2}) and consisted of the present-day Pittsburgh neighborhoods of Carrick, Hays, Brookline, and Overbrook, along with the present-day municipalities of Brentwood, Whitehall, Castle Shannon, and Baldwin Borough.

The coal seam lying underneath Baldwin Township made mining the township's largest industry. The township was also home to the first glass factories in Allegheny County. Agriculture was an important part of Baldwin Township's economy from 1753 to 1876. Its most well-known agricultural exports were cherries and whiskey (many citizens of Baldwin Township were part of the Whiskey Rebellion).

The township continued to thrive until the late 19th century. Due to the lack of maintenance throughout the township's roads, residents of many areas broke off to form their own municipalities. In 1901, 201 acres (0.81 km^{2}) became the Pittsburgh neighborhood of Hays. Three years later in 1904, Carrick and Brookline became Pittsburgh wards, taking with them 1,058 acres (4.28 km^{2}) and 138 acres (0.56 km^{2}), respectively. From 1915 to 1951, approximately 8,700 acres (35 km^{2}) of the original Baldwin Township broke off to become the municipalities of Brentwood, Castle Shannon, Mt. Lebanon, Whitehall, and Baldwin Borough. The City of Pittsburgh annexed an additional area of land that is now the city's Overbrook neighborhood.

Today, only 400 of the township's original 10,550 acres (42.7 km^{2}) remain. Historians calculate that if Baldwin Township had never been divided, it would now be the second largest community in Allegheny County, with a population of over 100,000.

== Government and politics ==
Presidential Elections Results
Year	Republican	Democratic	Third Parties
2020	45% 599	53% 710	1% 14
2016	45% 535	51% 605	3% 36
2012	44% 502	55% 633	1% 15

== Demographics ==
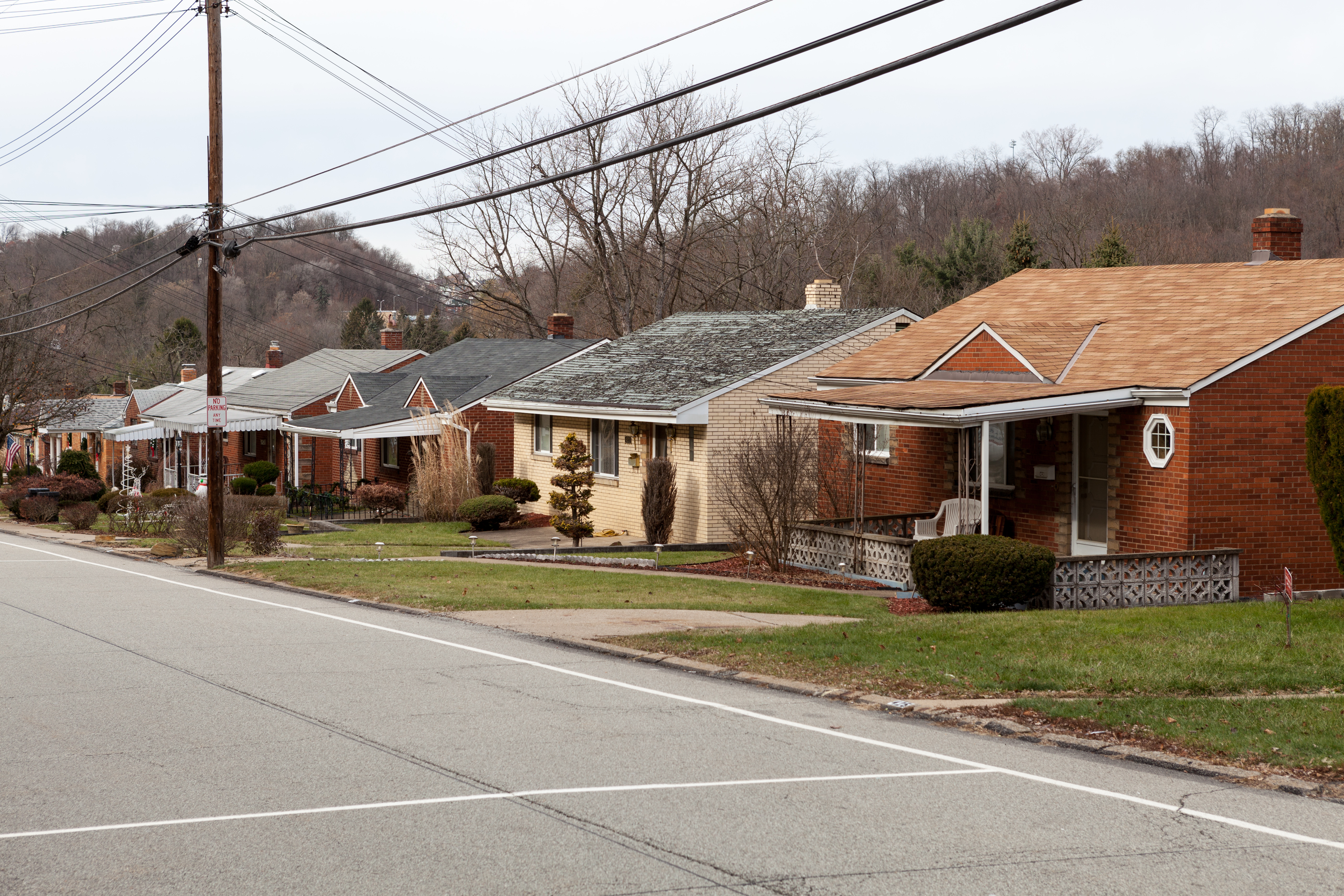
A row of houses on Pearce Rd

Historical population
Census	Pop.	Note	%±
1850	1,610		—
1860	2,746		70.6%
1870	3,104		13.0%
1880	4,373		40.9%
1890	4,860		11.1%
1900	8,212		69.0%
1910	8,230		0.2%
1920	4,928		−40.1%
1930	6,371		29.3%
1940	7,738		21.5%
1950	10,743		38.8%
1960	3,004		−72.0%
1970	3,026		0.7%
1980	2,680		−11.4%
1990	2,479		−7.5%
2000	2,244		−9.5%
2010	1,992		−11.2%
2020	1,984		−0.4%
2024 (est.)	1,920		−3.2%

As of the census of 2000, there were 2,244 people, 869 households, and 637 families residing in the township. The population density was 4,148.9 inhabitants per square mile (1,601.9/km^{2}). There were 880 housing units at an average density of 1,627.0 per square mile (628.2/km^{2}). The racial makeup of the township was 98.62% White, 0.27% African American, 0.58% Asian, 0.13% from other races, and 0.40% from two or more races. Hispanic or Latino of any race were 0.40% of the population.

There were 869 households, out of which 28.7% had children under the age of 18 living with them, 61.3% were married couples living together, 9.9% had a female householder with no husband present, and 26.6% were non-families. 23.8% of all households were made up of individuals, and 9.9% had someone living alone who was 65 years of age or older. The average household size was 2.50 and the average family size was 2.98.

In the township the population was spread out, with 22.7% under the age of 18, 4.3% from 18 to 24, 29.2% from 25 to 44, 23.8% from 45 to 64, and 19.9% who were 65 years of age or older. The median age was 41 years. For every 100 females there were 88.7 males. For every 100 females age 18 and over, there were 83.5 males.

The median income for a household in the township was $45,071, and the median income for a family was $52,200. Males had a median income of $38,750 versus $29,342 for females. The per capita income for the township was $20,918. About 3.3% of families and 4.7% of the population were below the poverty line, including 6.3% of those under age 18 and 3.1% of those age 65 or over.
