= Duquesne Heights =

- Neighborhood of Pittsburgh
- Coordinates: 40.436°N 80.020°W
- Country: United States
- State: Pennsylvania
- County: Allegheny County
- City: Pittsburgh

Area
  - Total: 0.623 sq mi (1.61 km^{2})

Population (2020)
  - Total: 2,397
  - Density: 3,850/sq mi (1,490/km^{2})

Duquesne Heights (/djuːˈkeɪn/ dew-KAYN) is a neighborhood in Pittsburgh, Pennsylvania's south city area. It has a zip code of 15211, and has representation on Pittsburgh City Council by the council member for District 2 (West and Southwest Neighborhoods).

== City Steps ==
The Duquesne Heights neighborhood has 14 distinct flights of city steps - many of which are open and in a safe condition. In Duquesne Heights, the public stairways in Pittsburgh quickly connect pedestrians to public transportation and provide an easy way to access the Emerald View Park Greenway trails.

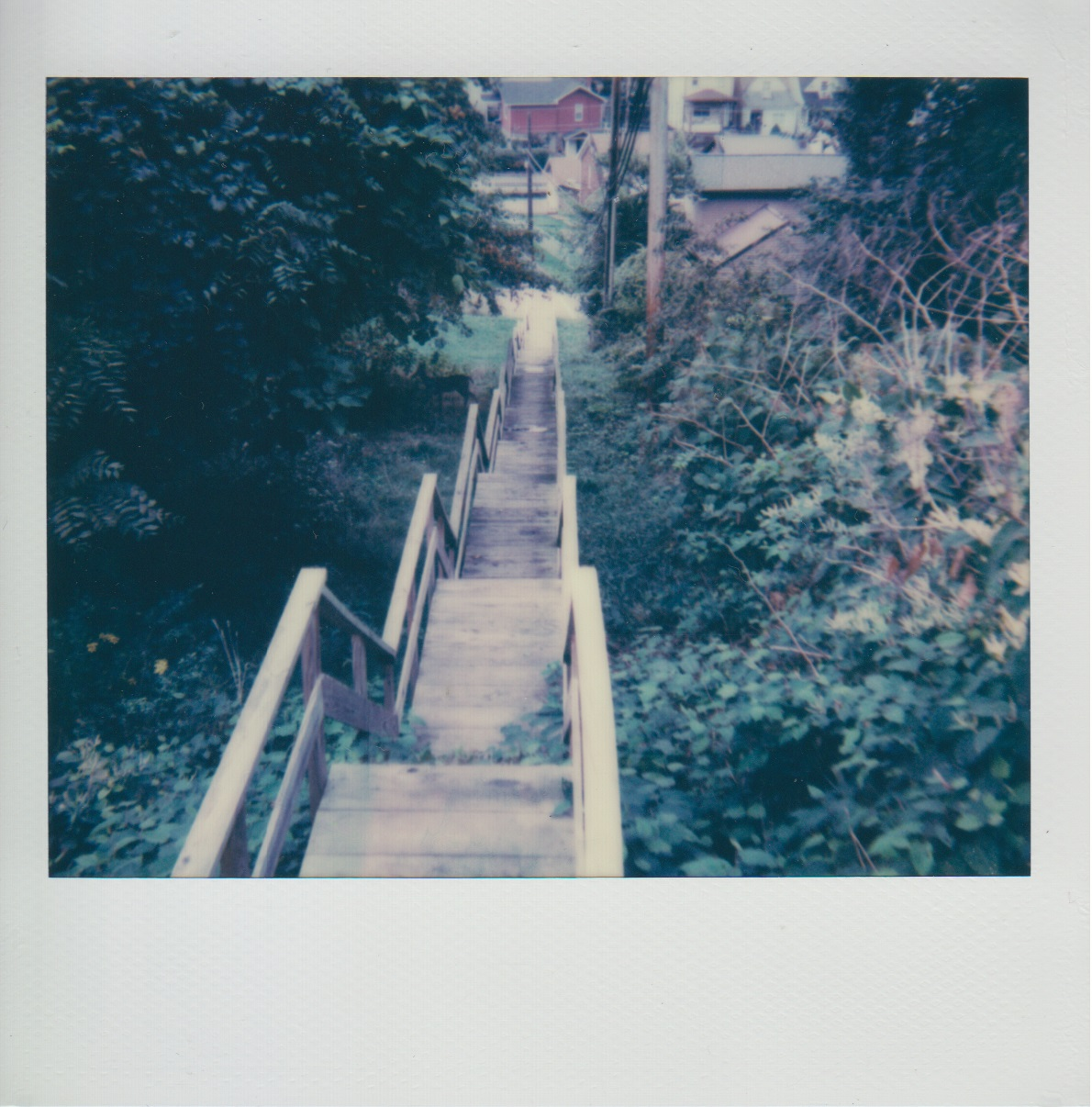
The newly refurbished Greenleaf Street city steps in Duquesne Heights

== Surrounding neighborhoods ==
Duquesne Heights has four Pittsburgh neighborhood borders, including the South Shore at the bottom of the hillside to the north (with the Duquesne Incline as the only direct link), Mt. Washington to the east, Beechview to the southwest and West End Valley to the west and northwest.

== See also ==
- List of Pittsburgh neighborhoods
