= Birmingham, Pennsylvania =

Birmingham, Pennsylvania may refer to:

- Birmingham, Allegheny County, Pennsylvania (now South Side Pittsburgh)
- Birmingham, Huntingdon County, Pennsylvania
- Birmingham Township, Chester County, Pennsylvania

or occasionally to

- Chadds Ford Township, Delaware County, Pennsylvania, formerly known as Birmingham Township and before 1790 part of the Chester County township.
