= Lincoln Place (Pittsburgh) =

Neighborhood of Pittsburgh in Allegheny County, Pennsylvania, United States

- Neighborhood of Pittsburgh
- Coordinates: 40.371°N 79.913°W
- Country: United States
- State: Pennsylvania
- County: Allegheny County
- City: Pittsburgh

Area
  - Total: 0.984 sq mi (2.55 km^{2})

Population (2010)
  - Total: 3,227
  - Density: 3,280/sq mi (1,270/km^{2})

Lincoln Place is a neighborhood in the 31st ward of Pittsburgh, Pennsylvania, located in the southeast corner of the city. It is represented on the Pittsburgh City Council by the representative of District 5, Barb Warwick.

The neighborhood is notable for being home to the largest water tower in western Pennsylvania. Additionally, McBride Park features the Pittsburgh Penguins, UPMC, deck hockey rink.

== Surrounding communities ==
Lincoln Place has four borders, including the Pittsburgh neighborhoods of Hays to the northwest and New Homestead to the north, and the boroughs of Munhall to the northeast and West Mifflin to the east, south, west and Hazelwood (Pittsburgh) to the north.

== See also ==
- List of Pittsburgh neighborhoods
