= St. Clair Village =

Coordinates: 40°24′28″N 79°58′33″W

St. Clair Village was a public housing project of the Pittsburgh Housing Authority. Originally built in the 1950s, with 680 apartments, it fell into disrepair and financial difficulty along with much public housing in the city and was demolished in September 2010. Following the destruction of the St. Clair Village in 2010, the area is currently being redeveloped by the Hilltop Urban Farm, with the goal of transforming the site into the largest urban farm in the United States. It occupied the area of Pittsburgh also known as St. Clair.

== Notable residents ==
- Phyllis Hyman
