= Baldwin, Pennsylvania =

Borough in Pennsylvania, US

- Borough
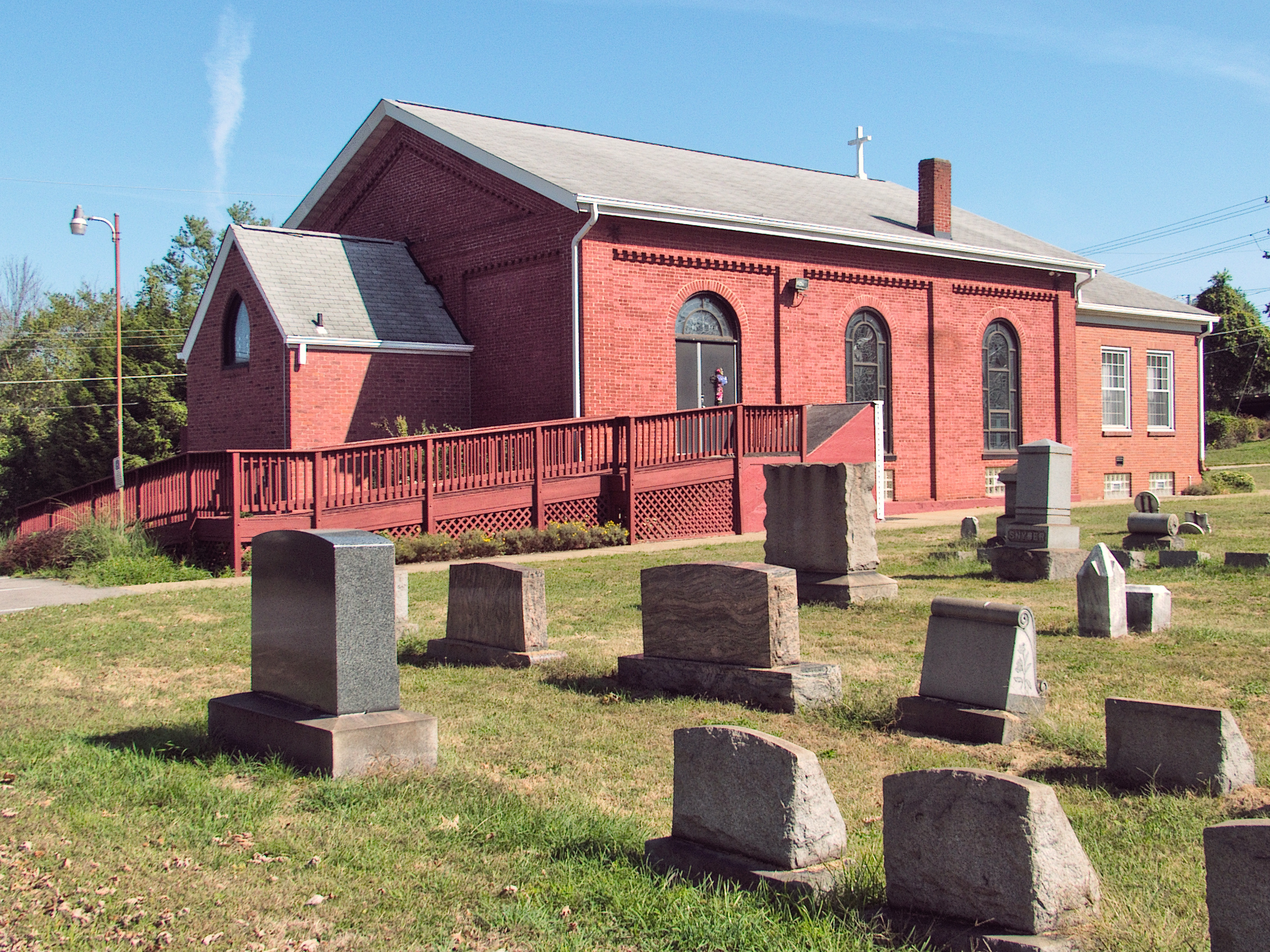
- North Zion Lutheran Church in Baldwin, Pennsylvania
- Etymology: Henry Baldwin
- Motto: "Just a Nice Place to Live!"
- Location in Allegheny County and the U.S. state of Pennsylvania
- Coordinates: 40°21′26″N 79°58′10″W
- Country: United States
- State: Pennsylvania
- County: Allegheny
- Incorporated: October 27, 1950
- Named after: Henry Baldwin (judge)

Government
  - Mayor: David Depretis (D)

Area
  - Total: 5.88 sq mi (15.22 km^{2})
  - Land: 5.77 sq mi (14.94 km^{2})
  - Water: 0.11 sq mi (0.28 km^{2})
- Elevation: 1,214 ft (370 m)

Population (2020)
  - Total: 21,510
  - Density: 3,728.1/sq mi (1,439.41/km^{2})
- Demonym: Baldwinite
- Time zone: UTC-5 (EST)
  - Summer (DST): UTC-4 (EDT)
- ZIP code: 15227
- Area code: 412
- FIPS code: 42-03928
- School District: Baldwin-Whitehall
- Website: Borough of Baldwin

Baldwin is a borough in Allegheny County, Pennsylvania, United States. Part of the Pittsburgh metropolitan area, the borough's population was 21,510 as of the 2020 census.

== History ==
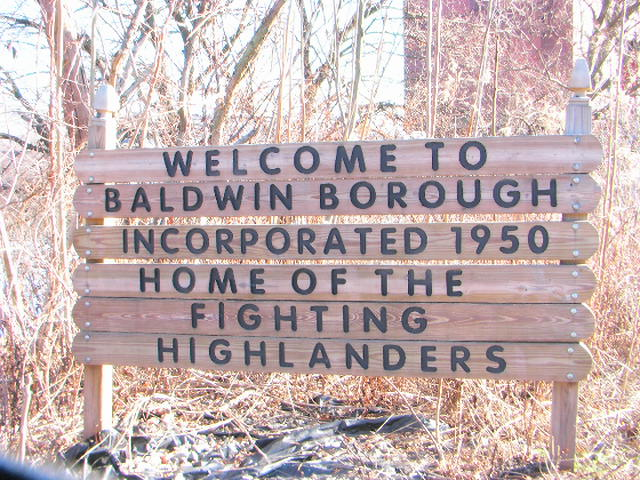
Baldwin welcome sign

The borough was named for Henry Baldwin (1780–1844), a U.S. Congressman from Pennsylvania and Associate Justice of the Supreme Court. Baldwin Borough was incorporated on October 27, 1950, from Baldwin Township.

== Geography ==
Baldwin is located at 40°21′26″N 79°58′10″W. A thin strip of land which is still part of Baldwin stretches north along Becks Run Road, separating St. Clair and Hays, reaching all the way to the Monongahela River. It then forms the south bank of the river almost to the Glenwood Bridge, effectively surrounding Hays on three sides.

According to the U.S. Census Bureau, the borough has a total area of 5.9 square miles (15 km^{2}), of which 5.8 square miles (15 km^{2}) is land and 0.1 square miles (0.26 km^{2}) is water. Its average elevation is 1,214 feet (370 m) above sea level.

=== Surrounding communities ===
Baldwin has eleven borders: Five with the Pittsburgh neighborhoods of Arlington and South Side Flats to the north, Hays to the northeast, Carrick to the west, and St. Clair to the north-northwest. The remaining borders are: West Mifflin to the east, Pleasant Hills to the southeast, South Park Township to the south, Bethel Park to the southwest, and Whitehall and Brentwood to the west.

== Demographics ==
Historical population
Census	Pop.	Note	%±
1960	24,489		—
1970	26,729		9.1%
1980	24,714		−7.5%
1990	21,923		−11.3%
2000	19,999		−8.8%
2010	19,767		−1.2%
2020	21,510		8.8%
U.S. Decennial Census

=== 2020 census ===
As of the 2020 census, Baldwin had a population of 21,510. The median age was 42.5 years. 19.1% of residents were under the age of 18 and 20.9% of residents were 65 years of age or older. For every 100 females there were 94.5 males, and for every 100 females age 18 and over there were 92.1 males age 18 and over.

100.0% of residents lived in urban areas, while 0.0% lived in rural areas.

There were 9,056 households in Baldwin, of which 25.8% had children under the age of 18 living in them. Of all households, 46.9% were married-couple households, 18.6% were households with a male householder and no spouse or partner present, and 27.9% were households with a female householder and no spouse or partner present. About 31.7% of all households were made up of individuals and 14.8% had someone living alone who was 65 years of age or older.

There were 9,523 housing units, of which 4.9% were vacant. The homeowner vacancy rate was 1.0% and the rental vacancy rate was 6.9%.

Racial composition as of the 2020 census
Race	Number	Percent
White	16,812	78.2%
Black or African American	1,105	5.1%
American Indian and Alaska Native	25	0.1%
Asian	2,617	12.2%
Native Hawaiian and Other Pacific Islander	16	0.1%
Some other race	163	0.8%
Two or more races	772	3.6%
Hispanic or Latino (of any race)	342	1.6%

=== 2000 census ===
At the 2000 census, there were 19,999 people in 8,193 households, including 5,776 families, in the borough. The population density was 3,465.5 people per square mile (1,338.0 people/km^{2}). There were 8,883 housing units at an average density of 1,539.3 per square mile (594.3/km^{2}). The racial makeup of the borough was 96.20% White, 2.42% African American, 0.05% Native American, 0.56% Asian, 0.01% Pacific Islander, 0.17% from other races, and 0.61% from two or more races. Hispanic or Latino of any race were 0.65% of the population.

There were 8,193 households, 27.3% had children under the age of 18 living with them, 56.7% were married couples living together, 10.5% had a female householder with no husband present, and 29.5% were non-families. 26.4% of households were made up of individuals, and 13.7% were one person aged 65 or older. The average household size was 2.41 and the average family size was 2.92.

The age distribution was 21.1% under the age of 18, 6.4% from 18 to 24, 26.7% from 25 to 44, 24.9% from 45 to 64, and 21.0% 65 or older. The median age was 43 years. For every 100 females, there were 90.1 males. For every 100 females age 18 and over, there were 86.5 males.

The median household income was $40,752 and the median family income was $48,503. Males had a median income of $39,086 versus $28,458 for females. The per capita income for the borough was $19,918. About 3.9% of families and 5.3% of the population were below the poverty line, including 7.4% of those under age 18 and 3.8% of those age 65 or over.

== Government and politics ==
The Borough of Baldwin is represented by elected officials including a 7-member borough council taking the position of Baldwin's Legislative Branch, and a borough mayor serving as the borough's Executive Branch. There are nine voting districts in the borough, Baldwin is included in the 14th Congressional District; 45th State Senatorial District with 2 State Legislative Districts (36th and 38th) serving its residents.

Presidential Elections Results
Year	Republican	Democratic	Third Parties
2024	46% 5,535	53% 6,316	1% 139
2020	44% 5,939	53% 7,151	1% 171
2016	46% 4,758	51% 5,273	3% 351
2012	45% 4,248	54% 5,144	1% 121

== Public services ==
Baldwin Borough is served by the Baldwin Borough Library. It has three volunteer fire companies (South Baldwin Volunteer Fire Company- Station 104, Baldwin Independent Fire Company No. 1- Station 105, Option Independent Fire Company- Station 107) an Emergency Medical Service (Baldwin Emergency Medical Services- Station 510), and a police force (Baldwin Borough Police Department) of 29 sworn officers.
