= Arlington Heights (Pittsburgh) =

- Neighborhood of Pittsburgh
- Coordinates: 40.415°N 79.970°W
- Country: United States
- State: Pennsylvania
- County: Allegheny County
- City: Pittsburgh

Area
  - Total: 0.132 sq mi (0.34 km^{2})

Population (2010)
  - Total: 244
  - Density: 1,850/sq mi (714/km^{2})
- ZIP Code: 15210

Arlington Heights is a neighborhood in the southern portion of Pittsburgh, Pennsylvania. The zip code used by residents is 15210, and this neighborhood is represented on the Pittsburgh City Council by the council member for District 3 (Central South Neighborhoods). This neighborhood is home to five government housing projects.

Historical population
Year	Pop.	±%
1940	2,413	—
1950	2,860	+18.5%
1960	2,272	−20.6%
1970	2,037	−10.3%
1980	1,466	−28.0%
1990	1,497	+2.1%
2000	238	−84.1%
2010	244	+2.5%
Source: University of Pittsburgh

== Twenty Second Street Incline ==
Arlington Heights was once connected to the mills along the Monongahela River by the Twenty Second Street Incline, which ran from Josephine Street to Salisbury Street, near the location of Fort McKinley.

== Surrounding Pittsburgh neighborhoods ==
Arlington Heights has only two borders with the Pittsburgh neighborhoods of the South Side Slopes to the northwest and Arlington to the northeast, south and southwest.

== See also ==
- List of Pittsburgh neighborhoods
