= Birmingham, Allegheny County, Pennsylvania =

Birmingham Borough
- Former Borough
- Location within the state of Pennsylvania
- Coordinates: 40.429°N 79.987°W
- Country: United States
- State: Pennsylvania
- County: Allegheny
- Established: 1811
- Incorporated (borough): 10 April 1826
- Dissolved: 1872
- Founder: Nathaniel Bedford
- Named for: Birmingham, England
- Time zone: UTC-5 (Eastern (EST))
  - Summer (DST): UTC-4 (EDT)

Birmingham was a borough in Allegheny County, Pennsylvania, on the South Side of what is now Pittsburgh. Incorporated in 1826 from St. Clair Township, the borough comprised a section of the South Side Flats between what is now South 6th and South 17th Streets.

Birmingham was laid out in 1811 by Dr. Nathaniel Bedford, son-in-law of John Ormsby. Bedford named the settlement after his native city, Birmingham in England.

Birmingham became flanked by the boroughs of South Pittsburgh (created 1848) on the west and East Birmingham (1849) on the east. Those three and other nearby boroughs were merged into Pittsburgh in 1872.

The namesake Birmingham Bridge is actually located at the former East Birmingham.
