= Arlington (Pittsburgh) =

- Neighborhood of Pittsburgh
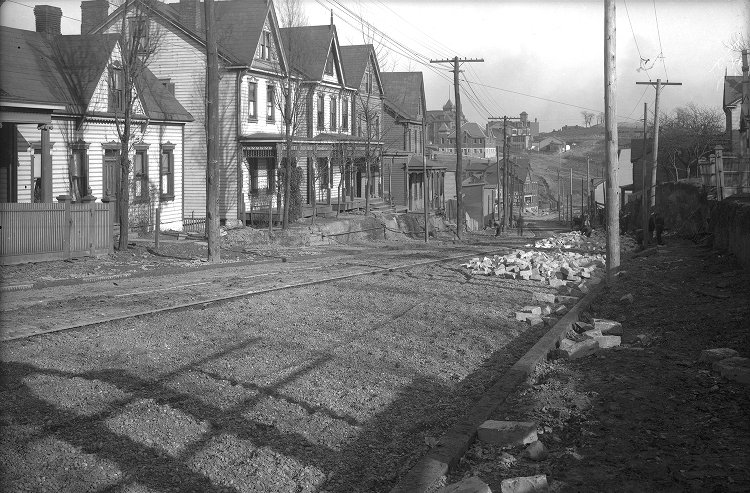
- Arlington Avenue, Arlington, Pittsburgh, 1907

- Coordinates: 40.415°N 79.970°W
- Country: United States
- State: Pennsylvania
- County: Allegheny County
- City: Pittsburgh

Area
  - Total: 0.47 sq mi (1.2 km^{2})

Population (2010)
  - Total: 1,869
  - Density: 4,000/sq mi (1,500/km^{2})
- ZIP Code: 15210

Arlington is a neighborhood in southern Pittsburgh, Pennsylvania, United States. The zip code used by residents is 15210, and the neighborhood is represented in the Pittsburgh City Council by the council member for District 3 (Central South Neighborhoods). Arlington houses PBF 22 Engine, and is covered by PBP Zone 3 and the Bureau of EMS Medic 2. The City has discussed the possibility of closing 22 engine completely. 22 engine is a vital key to second and third alarm firefighting in the city.

== Surrounding neighborhoods ==
Arlington has eight borders, six with the Pittsburgh neighborhoods of the South Side Slopes to the north, Arlington Heights to the northeast, South Side Flats to the far east, Hays to the southeast, St. Clair to the south, and Mt. Oliver to the southwest. The other two borders are with the boroughs of Baldwin to the southeast and Mt. Oliver to the northwest

Historical population
Census	Pop.	Note	%±
1940	2,702		—
1950	3,203		18.5%
1960	4,430		38.3%
1970	3,949		−10.9%
1980	2,294		−41.9%
1990	2,210		−3.7%
2000	1,999		−9.5%
2010	1,869		−6.5%

== See also ==
- List of Pittsburgh neighborhoods
