= Beltzhoover (Pittsburgh) =

- Neighborhood of Pittsburgh; Former borough
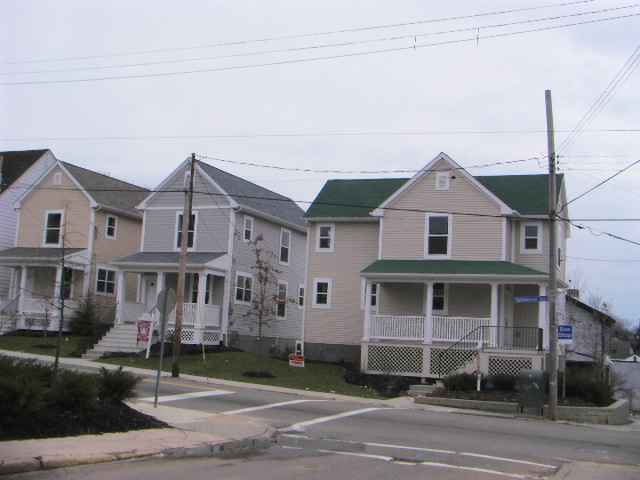
- Houses in Beltzhoover built circa 2003 to 2006

- Coordinates: 40.416°N 80.003°W
- Country: United States
- State: Pennsylvania
- County: Allegheny County
- City: Pittsburgh

Area
  - Total: 0.421 sq mi (1.09 km^{2})

Population (2010)
  - Total: 1,925
  - Density: 4,570/sq mi (1,770/km^{2})
- ZIP Code: 15210

Beltzhoover is a neighborhood in southern Pittsburgh, Pennsylvania, in an area known as the South Hills.

The area is named for Melchior Beltzhoover who was a tradesman there in the early 19th century. The community borders McKinley Park. The neighborhood lies in the 18th ward and is predominantly an African-American neighborhood. The area has commonly been referred as up and coming, due to fact that the crime rate has decreased tremendously over the past ten years.

The neighborhood is currently the subject of a revitalization effort by local organizations, such as the Beltzhoover Consensus Group, the Hilltop Housing Initiative, and the Urban Redevelopment Authority. The hope is to reestablish the business districts, maintain current homeowners and create new homeowners by rehabbing current vacant homes. The Beltzhoover School, 60,000 sq ft, was recently purchased by the BCG and will be renovated in the next several years to boost the economy of Beltzhoover.

Historical population
Year	Pop.	±%
1940	8,407	—
1950	8,153	−3.0%
1960	7,064	−13.4%
1970	5,908	−16.4%
1980	4,206	−28.8%
1990	3,338	−20.6%
2000	2,783	−16.6%
2010	1,925	−30.8%
2020	1,604	−16.7%
Source: University of Pittsburgh WPRDC

== Surrounding neighborhoods ==
Beltzhoover has four Pittsburgh neighborhood borders, including Mount Washington to the north and west, Allentown to the upper east, Knoxville to the mid and lower east, and Bon Air to the south and southwest.

== See also ==
- List of Pittsburgh neighborhoods
