= Oliver Ormsby =

- Born: February 23, 1767; Bedford, Pennsylvania
- Died: July 26, 1832 (aged 65)
- Resting place: Trinity Cathedral Churchyard, Pittsburgh, PA
- Known for: Mount Oliver, Pennsylvania
- Spouse: Sarah Mahon
- Children: Jane, Sarah, Sidney, Caroline, Mary Mahon, John, Oliveretta, Oliver Harrison
- Parent(s): John Ormsby, Jane McAllister

Oliver Ormsby (February 25, 1767 – July 26, 1832) was a merchant in Pittsburgh, Pennsylvania. He was a wealthy and influential leader in the city, and the borough of Mount Oliver, Pennsylvania, is named in his honor.

== Career ==
After his father died in 1805, Oliver continued his father's trading business in north-western Pennsylvania, and expanded it to new locations at Erie, Pennsylvania, and Niagara, New York. During the War of 1812, Ormsby was the acting naval agent in Pittsburgh and worked with Oliver Hazard Perry to successfully outfit the Lake Erie Fleet. In 1820, he was also a commissioned merchant, a director of the Pittsburgh branch of the U. S. Bank, owner of a flour mill in Cincinnati, Ohio, a cotton factory and rope walk in Chillicothe, Ohio, a grist, sandmill, forge, and iron furnace in Beaver Falls, Pennsylvania. His steam powered flour mill in Cincinnati burned down in 1823. He was on the board of managers at Monongahela Bridge Company and was occasionally a member of the Pittsburgh town council.

== Life and family ==
Ormsby was the son of John Ormsby and Jane McAllister, born on February 25, 1767, at Homestead Farm later a part of Pittsburgh and died on July 26, 1832, in the Pittsburgh South Side. His siblings were John Jr. Jane, Joseph, and Sidney. He was educated at one of the Harrison Estates in Virginia. He married Sarah Mahon, daughter of David Mahon and Sarah Dougherty. Ormsby had one son live to adulthood, also Oliver (married Jane Eliza Hoffa), and several daughters, including Jane (married Robert Ormsby), Josephine (married Edward Madison Yard), Sidney (married John Harding Page), Sarah (married Asher Phillips), Mary (married Elias Phillips), Oliveretta (married Clifton Wharton), Caroline (died young), and John (died young). His son's estate included forests, meadows, and a private racetrack overlooking the Monongahela River, and Mount Oliver, Pennsylvania, takes its name from Oliver Jr.
