= Glen Hazel =

- Neighborhood of Pittsburgh
- Coordinates: 40.406°N 79.929°W
- Country: United States
- State: Pennsylvania
- County: Allegheny County
- City: Pittsburgh

Area
  - Total: 0.456 sq mi (1.18 km^{2})

Population (2010)
  - Total: 716
  - Density: 1,570/sq mi (606/km^{2})

Glen Hazel is a neighborhood in Pittsburgh, Pennsylvania's east city area. It has both zip codes of 15207 and 15217. It is represented on the Pittsburgh City Council by Barb Warwick. The neighborhood is located on a hilltop along the Monongahela River and primarily consists of a public housing development of the same name, along with a county-owned nursing home.

Glen Hazel was developed by the Federal Works Agency during World War II as a government housing project for defense workers called Glen Hazel Heights. The 1,000-unit development was built in 1941–1942 and was one of the largest defense housing projects in the country. The defense housing was razed in the 1970s and replaced with a new 104-unit public housing project and a 155-unit senior living facility.

== Surrounding and connecting Pittsburgh neighborhoods ==
Situated along the Monongahela River, most of Glen Hazel is bordered by Hazelwood and shares a small border with Squirrel Hill South to the northeast. The Glenwood Bridge across the Monongahela connects Glen Hazel to another Pittsburgh neighborhood, Hays, to the south.

== See also ==
- List of Pittsburgh neighborhoods
