= St. Clair (Pittsburgh) =

- Neighborhood of Pittsburgh
- Coordinates: 40.409°N 79.973°W
- Country: United States
- State: Pennsylvania
- County: Allegheny County
- City: Pittsburgh

Area
  - Total: 0.31 sq mi (0.80 km^{2})

Population (2010)
  - Total: 209
  - Density: 670/sq mi (260/km^{2})

St. Clair is a neighborhood in Pittsburgh, Pennsylvania in the United States. The neighborhood was the last remnant of Lower St. Clair Township to be annexed by the City of Pittsburgh in 1920.

== History and features ==
Most of the St. Clair neighborhood was composed of St. Clair Village, a 556-unit public housing project owned by the Housing Authority of the City of Pittsburgh and built in the early 1950s. As of 2010, the housing complex was completely demolished with the housing authority retaining the ground for possible future development of townhouses.

There are no stores or other commercial businesses in St. Clair; it is a strictly residential community. There is, however, one church, Lighthouse Cathedral, serving the community as well as various social service agencies at work in St. Clair for the largely poor population.

Following the destruction of the St. Clair Village in 2010, redevelopment efforts were initiated by the Hilltop Urban Farm, with the goal of transforming the site into the largest urban farm in the United States.

== Surrounding neighborhoods and communities ==
St. Clair has five borders, four with the Pittsburgh neighborhoods of Arlington to the north, Hays to the southeast, Carrick to the southwest, and Mount Oliver to the west. The other border is with two sections of Baldwin Borough to the east and south.

== See also ==
- List of Pittsburgh neighborhoods
