= South Shore (Pittsburgh) =

- Neighborhood of Pittsburgh
- Coordinates: 40.4418°N 80.0203°W
- Country: United States
- State: Pennsylvania
- County: Allegheny County
- City: Pittsburgh

Area
  - Total: 0.212 sq mi (0.55 km^{2})

Population (2010)
  - Total: 19
  - Density: 90/sq mi (35/km^{2})

The South Shore is an American neighborhood that is located in the South Side of Pittsburgh, Pennsylvania, United States. It encompasses the area surrounding Carson Street, from the West End Bridge to the Liberty Bridge.

== History and notable features ==
The South Shore is an industrial neighborhood that is home to several warehouses. It is primarily made up of the popular Station Square, a mixed-use historic preservation development of the former Pittsburgh and Lake Erie Railroad and surrounding areas, that was conceptualized by Arthur P. Ziegler Jr., one of the founding national leaders of historic preservation in the United States and president of the Pittsburgh History and Landmarks Foundation.

== Demographics ==
The population of the South Shore was 56, according to the 2000 census, and 19 in 2010.

== Surrounding Pittsburgh neighborhoods ==
South Side Flats, Mt. Washington (via South Hills Light Rail Tunnel, Wabash Tunnel, Duquesne Incline and Monongahela Incline), Downtown Pittsburgh (via Smithfield Street Bridge), West End Valley

== See also ==
- List of Pittsburgh neighborhoods
