= Saint Michael's Roman Catholic Church & Rectory =

Church building in Pittsburgh, Pennsylvania, USA

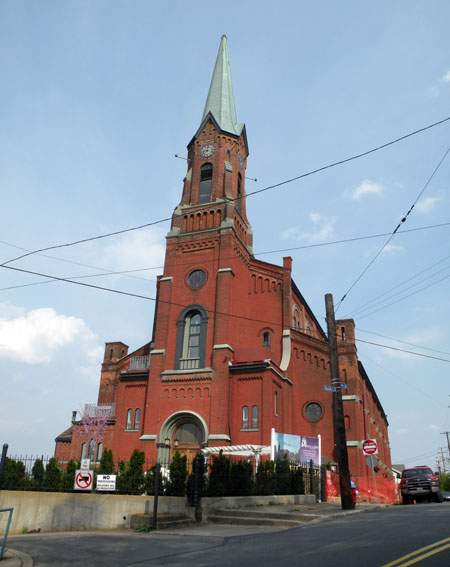

- Location within Pittsburgh
- 40°25′29.77″N 79°59′3.7″W
- Location: 21 Pius Street (South Side Slopes), Pittsburgh, Pennsylvania, USA

History
- Built: 1861 (church), 1890 (rectory)

Saint Michael's Roman Catholic Church & Rectory (also known as St. Michael the Archangel Church, and currently called Angel's Arms Condominiums) is a former Roman Catholic church and rectory located at 21 Pius Street in the South Side Slopes neighborhood of Pittsburgh, Pennsylvania. The church was built from 1855 to 1861 and designed in Romanesque Revival style by architect Charles Bartberger (1824–1896). The rectory behind the church (which can be seen at this link) was built in 1890 and designed in Richardsonian Romanesque style by architect Frederick C. Sauer (1860–1942). Both the church and the rectory were added to the List of City of Pittsburgh historic designations on February 23, 2001, and the church was added to the List of Pittsburgh History and Landmarks Foundation Historic Landmarks in 1970.
