= Bon Air (Pittsburgh) =

- Neighborhood of Pittsburgh
- Coordinates: 40.408°N 80.000°W
- Country: United States
- State: Pennsylvania
- County: Allegheny County
- City: Pittsburgh

Area
  - Total: 0.313 sq mi (0.81 km^{2})

Population (2010)
  - Total: 808
  - Density: 2,580/sq mi (997/km^{2})
- ZIP Code: 15226, 15210

Bon Air is a neighborhood in the south portion of Pittsburgh, Pennsylvania, United States. Its two zip codes are 15226 and 15210, and it is represented in the Pittsburgh City Council by the council member for District 4 (South Neighborhoods).

Bon Air is small in geographic size compared to the other communities in District 4. It is on a mountaintop, surrounded almost entirely by steep forested mountainsides. Road access to Bon Air is limited by only two connecting streets to the Knoxville neighborhood to the east. North of Bon Air is McKinley Park, with a 120-foot drop down to Bausman Avenue, to the west another drop down to Route 51. South is a precipitous drop down to a low forested valley and east a drop down into a large cemetery. Bon Air is served by its own "T" (light-rail) stop from which residents can be in Downtown Pittsburgh in minutes and is also the terminus of the 54 Bus that travels directly to the Oakland neighborhood.

The neighborhood is a balanced mix of families, single persons, and senior citizens. There is no commercial zoning on the Bon Air mountaintop, and all the residences are single-family homes. There is a small park on the mountaintop.

Historical population
Year	Pop.	±%
1940	814	—
1950	1,330	+63.4%
1960	1,500	+12.8%
1970	1,428	−4.8%
1980	1,144	−19.9%
1990	1,006	−12.1%
2000	889	−11.6%
2010	808	−9.1%
Source: University of Pittsburgh

== Surrounding neighborhoods ==
Bon Air has six Pittsburgh neighborhood borders, including Beltzhoover to the north, Knoxville to the upper east, Carrick to the east and south, Brookline to the south and west, and Beechview and Mount Washington to the northwest. With the exception of two streets that connect Bon Air to Knoxville, there is no direct road or trail connection between the Bon Air mountaintop and any other neighborhoods.

== See also ==
- List of Pittsburgh neighborhoods
