= St. Clair Township, Allegheny County, Pennsylvania =

St. Clair Township
- Former Township
- Location within the state of Pennsylvania
- Coordinates: 40°18′27″N 80°05′28″W
- Country: United States
- State: Pennsylvania
- County: Allegheny
- Time zone: UTC-5 (Eastern (EST))
  - Summer (DST): UTC-4 (EDT)

St. Clair Township, Allegheny County, Pennsylvania, was one of the original townships created with the incorporation of Allegheny County in 1788. The township was named after Arthur St. Clair, an American Revolutionary War general and president of the Continental Congress in 1787.

The township extended from the Ohio and Monongahela rivers to the southern county line. It was bounded on the west by Chartiers Creek and on the east partially by Streets Run. The township was subsequently divided between the northern part, Lower St. Clair Township, and the southern part, Upper St. Clair Township. The "upper" and "lower" referred to the elevation, as Lower St. Clair bordered on the river, the lowest elevation, and Upper St. Clair extended into the South Hills of Pittsburgh.

The original Lower St. Clair Township consisted of the present-day neighborhoods of the City of Pittsburgh south of the Monongahela and Ohio, and all or parts of Green Tree, Carnegie, Baldwin, Bridgeville, Dormont, Mount Lebanon and other boroughs and townships in the South Hills. The township was subdivided several times, and today exists only as the neighborhood of St. Clair in the City of Pittsburgh.

Upper St. Clair Township, subdivided many times, still exists in the South Hills of Pittsburgh.
