= Hays (Pittsburgh) =

Coordinates: 40.40238°N 79.96021°W

- Neighborhood of Pittsburgh
- Country: United States
- State: Pennsylvania
- County: Allegheny County
- City: Pittsburgh

Area
  - Total: 1.75 sq mi (4.5 km^{2})

Population (2010)
  - Total: 362
  - Density: 207/sq mi (79.9/km^{2})

Hays is a neighborhood in the 31st Ward of the east side of Pittsburgh, Pennsylvania. It is represented on the Pittsburgh City Council by the representative of District 5 (Barb Warwick). It occupies ZIP codes 15227, 15207, and 15236. It is named after James H. Hays, who opened a coal-mining operation called Hays and Haberman Mines in 1828.

Hays was first settled in 1789 when still part of Baldwin Township by John Smalls, who named the area Six Mile Ferry Village. The H.B. Hays and Brothers Coal Railroad was a narrow gauge railroad that ran from the coal mine along Streets Run to the coal tipple at Six Mile Ferry.

The neighborhood was formerly the site of the Hays Army Ammunition Plant, built by the U.S. Navy in 1942. The plant was transferred to the Army in 1966, and during its heyday between World War II and the Vietnam War employed more than a thousand people. In 1970 the plant was put on standby status until disposition in 1988. In 1993 the site was donated to the Urban Redevelopment Authority of Pittsburgh. The closing of the plant has led to an enormous loss of population: in 1940 the population was 2,238, while in 2010 the population was only 362.

== History ==
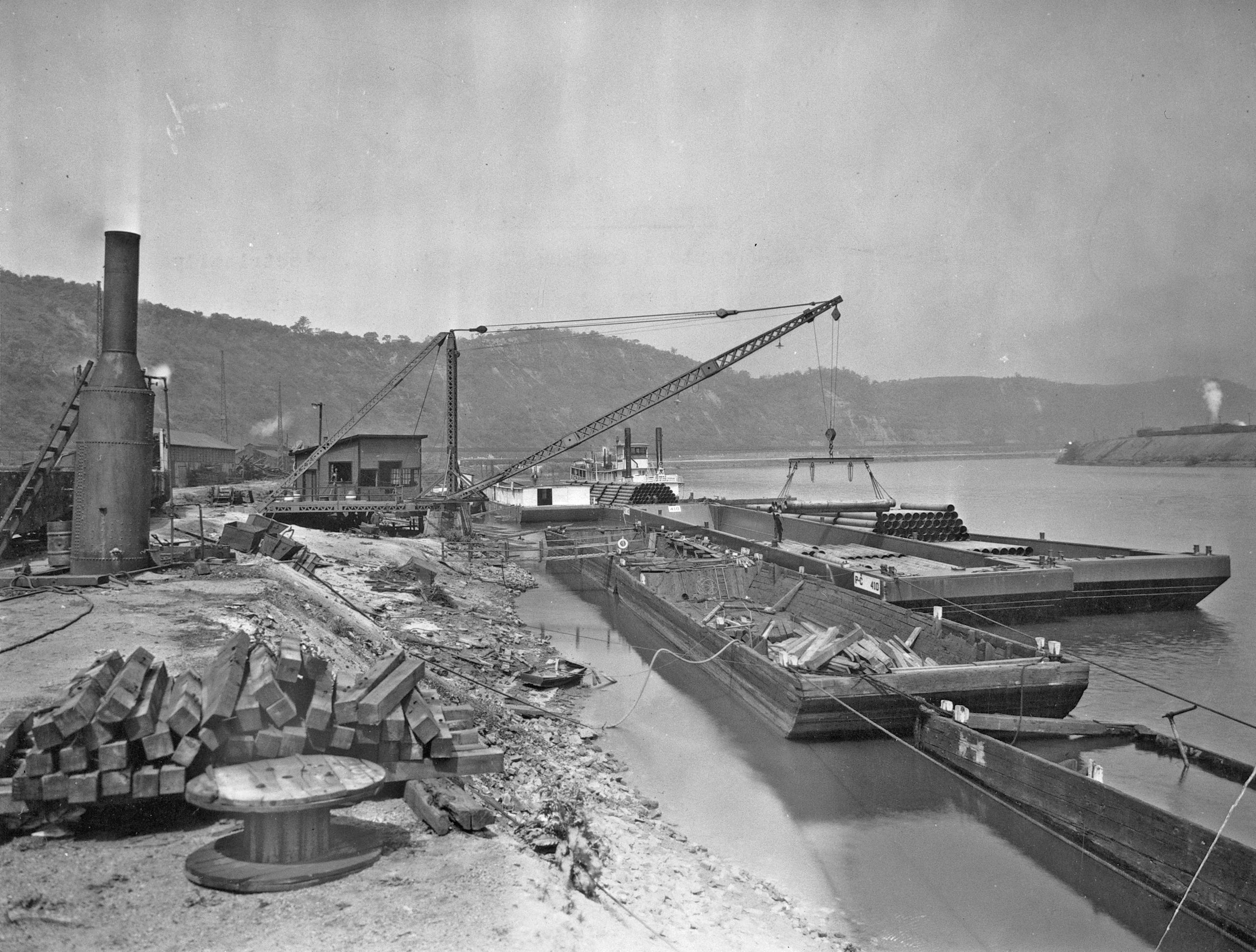
Barges being loaded at Hays on the Monongahela River, ca. 1930

In 1901, the Pittsburgh neighborhood of Hays was formed from the northern 201 acres (0.81 km^{2}) of Baldwin Township. Annexation to Pittsburgh was completed on Jan. 7, 1929.

== Hays Woods ==
Hays encompasses the area known as Hays Woods, a 635-acre (257 ha)+ woodland, the largest undeveloped tract of land in the city of Pittsburgh (even larger than Frick Park). Hays Woods is the best example of the city's natural environment and has six streams, including a waterfall. The area is home to nesting bald eagles. The 613-acre (2.48 km^{2}) parcel of land including Hays Woods was identified as a possible site for a thoroughbred racetrack and housing development after developer Charles Betters' application to strip mine the area was declined. In 2016, the parcel was signed over to the city of Pittsburgh and is slated to become the largest park in Pittsburgh.

== Bald eagle nesting ==
After an absence of about two centuries, bald eagles were spotted in the Hays Neighborhood in January 2013 and were reported to the Pennsylvania Game Commission. The eagle pair produced a single fledgling in 2013, and three fledglings in 2014. The eagle presence produced a large amount of fanfare on the Great Allegheny Passage which provided people with a place to view the eagles.

== Surrounding communities ==
Hays is bordered by the Pittsburgh neighborhoods of Arlington to the north, St. Clair to the northwest, New Homestead to the east and Lincoln Place to the southeast. Three boroughs also border Hays: Baldwin to the southwest, north and southeast, West Homestead to the east and West Mifflin to the south. Hazelwood (Pittsburgh) to the north. As a result of the portion of Baldwin Borough from Becks Run Road to the end of East Carson Street and the western end of West Homestead, there is no direct border of Hays to the Monongahela River.

== See also ==
- List of Pittsburgh neighborhoods
