= Mount Oliver (Pittsburgh) =

- Neighborhood of Pittsburgh
- Coordinates: 40.412°N 79.980°W
- Country: United States
- State: Pennsylvania
- County: Allegheny County
- City: Pittsburgh

Area
  - Total: 0.100 sq mi (0.26 km^{2})

Population (2010)
  - Total: 509
  - Density: 5,090/sq mi (1,970/km^{2})

Mount Oliver is a south neighborhood of Pittsburgh, Pennsylvania. It has a zip code of 15210, and has representation on Pittsburgh City Council by the council member for District 3 (Central South Neighborhoods). It is adjacent to, but distinct from, the borough of Mount Oliver.

== See also ==
- List of Pittsburgh neighborhoods
