= Hazelwood (Pittsburgh) =

- Neighborhood of Pittsburgh
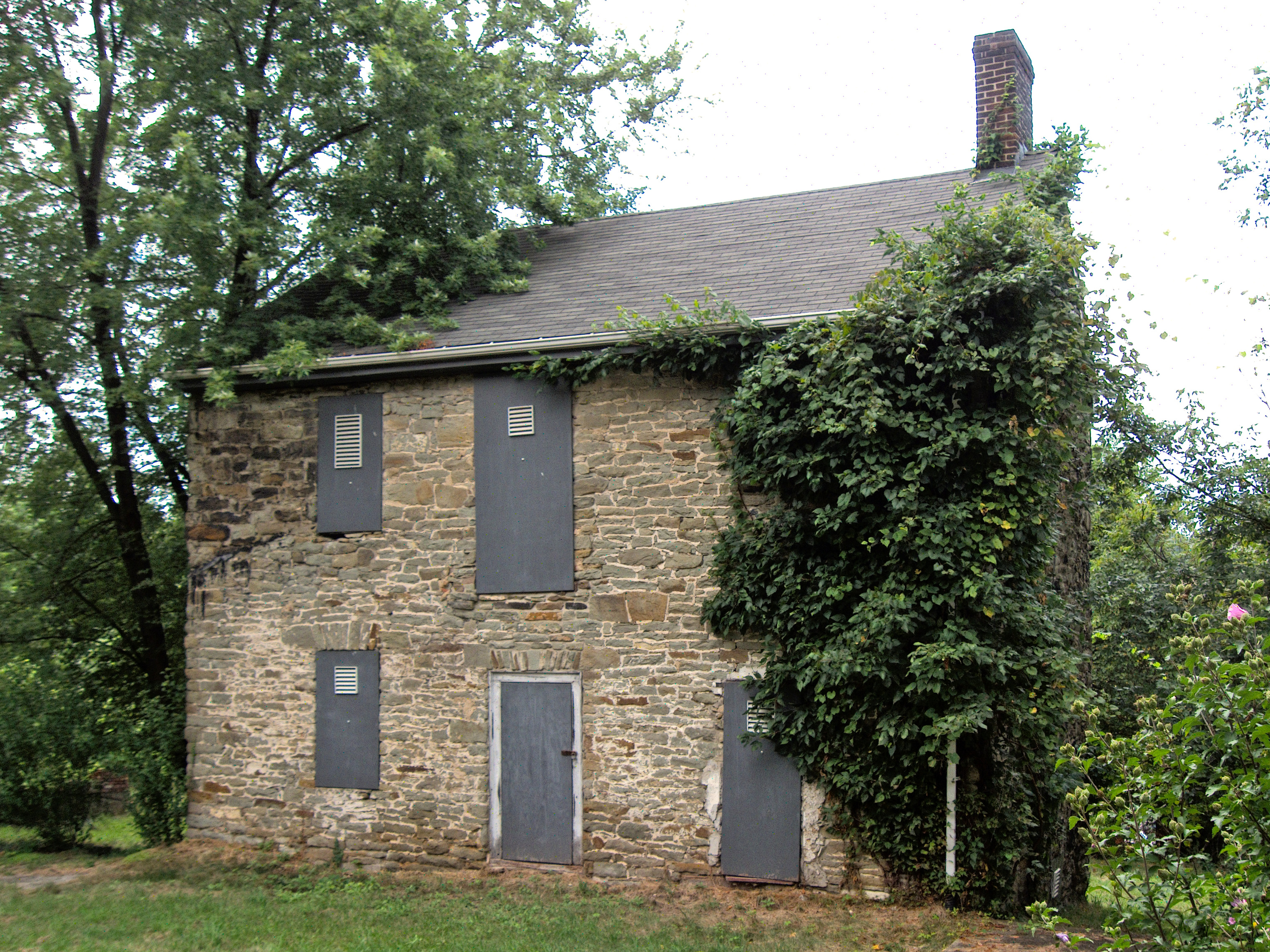
- The John Woods House, built in 1792, is one of the oldest houses in the city of Pittsburgh.

- Coordinates: 40.409°N 79.941°W
- Country: United States
- State: Pennsylvania
- County: Allegheny County
- City: Pittsburgh

Area
  - Total: 1.583 sq mi (4.10 km^{2})

Population (2010)
  - Total: 4,317
  - Density: 2,727/sq mi (1,053/km^{2})

Hazelwood is a neighborhood of Pittsburgh, Pennsylvania in the United States. It is represented on Pittsburgh City Council by Barb Warwick. It is bordered by Greenfield and Oakland on the north, Squirrel Hill and Glen Hazel on the east, and the Monongahela River on the south and west. The Pittsburgh Bureau of Fire houses 13 Engine and 13 Truck in Hazelwood.

== Early history ==
In 1758 a large tract of woodland was purchased for $10,000 under the Stanwix Treaty made with the Native-Americans. This area would include Hazelwood and Greenfield of the 15th ward.

Hazelwood takes its name from the hazelnut trees which once flourished along the Monongahela river. The first settlers were of Scottish descent and settled what was known as Scotch Bottom. This area ran from Four Mile Run (lower Greenfield) to Six Mile Ferry, four and six miles (10 km) from the Point (where the Allegheny and Monongahela Rivers merge) respectively. Among the first settlers was John Woods, a politician who built his 'Hazel Hill' estate in 1784. That house still stands, the second oldest stone building in Pittsburgh after The Fort Pitt Blockhouse. Eventually, large farms were cut out of the wooded hills, attracting more residents and supplying the area with further wealth.

== Industrial age ==
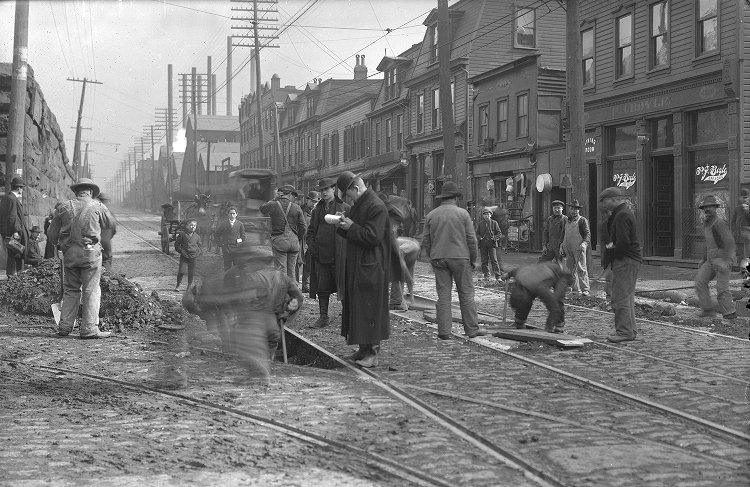
Construction at Second and Greenfield Avenues, Hazelwood, 1906

The first track of railroad was built by Mr. B. F. Jones, of the Pittsburgh and Connellsville Railroad and later of Jones and Laughlin. Unlike most lines, this railroad was built inland as to respect the residents concern of maintaining the river's aesthetic value. This railroad would later separate Hazelwood into two sections, coining the local term 'below the tracks'. In 1869 Hazelwood was incorporated into the city, and by the following year the railway had spurred iron and steel industries, railroading, boatbuilding and the river trade.

By the late 19th century Hazelwood was a bustling town. In the 1950s the neighborhood was host to over 200 businesses. It had become home to large Hungarian, Italian, Slovak, Carpatho-Rusin, Polish, and Irish populations. With the construction of the Civic Arena in the Hill District large African-American populations made Hazelwood a home.

In the 1980s the steel industry began to decline. As the industry packed up, so did business and many residents. Like many areas in the rust-belt, Hazelwood fell into disrepair. Hazelwood was home to the city of Pittsburgh's last operating steel mill, the Hazelwood Coke Works, which was owned by Jones and Laughlin and later, its parent company, LTV, when it closed in 1998.

Recently, Hazelwood has been working to improve as a community. Many abandoned buildings have been razed, and new ones constructed in their place. In addition, some parks, such as Lewis Playground, in the neighborhood have been updated to provide recreation for the residents.

Hazelwood and Glen Hazel are family-oriented neighborhoods, with many community activities focusing on youth programs. The neighborhoods are noted for their numerous churches and the active roles they play in building community spirit and pride in their residents.

According to a December 23, 2008, article in the Pittsburgh Post-Gazette, Dimperio's Market, the only full service grocery store in Hazelwood, would close because of shoplifters.

== Neighborhood revitalization ==
External audio
- Hazelwood, A Pittsburgh Neighborhood on the Cusp of Change, 25:05, Grapple, Keystone Crossroads

Mirroring Pittsburgh's overall decline, Hazelwood suffered a significant population loss and disinvestment following the decline of the steel industry and the final shuttering of the LTV Coke Works in 1997. However, the purchase of the 178-acre vacant brownfield site in 2002 by Almono LP (at the time composed of four Pittsburgh foundations) marked the beginning of a new era for Hazelwood. Since then, the neighborhood and community have organized to reinvest and revitalize their main street - Second Avenue - with new local-serving retail, stabilize and improve housing stock and affordability, and ensure redevelopment of the vacant 178-acre site is a positive catalyst for the neighborhood. These reinvestment efforts are often aided by the same foundations that compose Almono LP and own Hazelwood Green: the Claude Worthington Benedum Foundation, The Heinz Endowments, and the Richard King Mellon Foundation.

On January 8, 2019, the amended SP-10 Zoning Ordinance was passed by City Council for the 178-acre site, Hazelwood Green. This Zoning Ordinance amendment accompanied the new Preliminary Land Development Plan (PLDP), which was approved on September 11, 2018, by Pittsburgh Planning Commission to replace the plan of record. The PLDP provides a core framework with flexible programming and development approaches to make the site adaptive to fast shifting externalities. The PLDP has been designed (and registered with USGBC) to meet LEED for Neighborhood Development Plan standards, with an expectation to reach Gold certification in 2019. The plan calls for approximately 8 million square feet of development that would be home to 5,000 residents and approximately 15,000 employees.

To date, much of the horizontal development of Hazelwood Green has been completed, including: preliminary remediation, mass grading, new streets and utilities, and stormwater management system. After decades of being closed to the public, the site's new streets - extensions of Hazelwood Avenue and Blair Street - were publicly dedicated and opened to the public on April 1, 2019. This was followed by the first tenants moving into the new building at Mill 19 in the summer of 2019. In 2020, the site's first public open space - the Plaza - was expected to be completed and opened to the public, along with additional buildings opening.

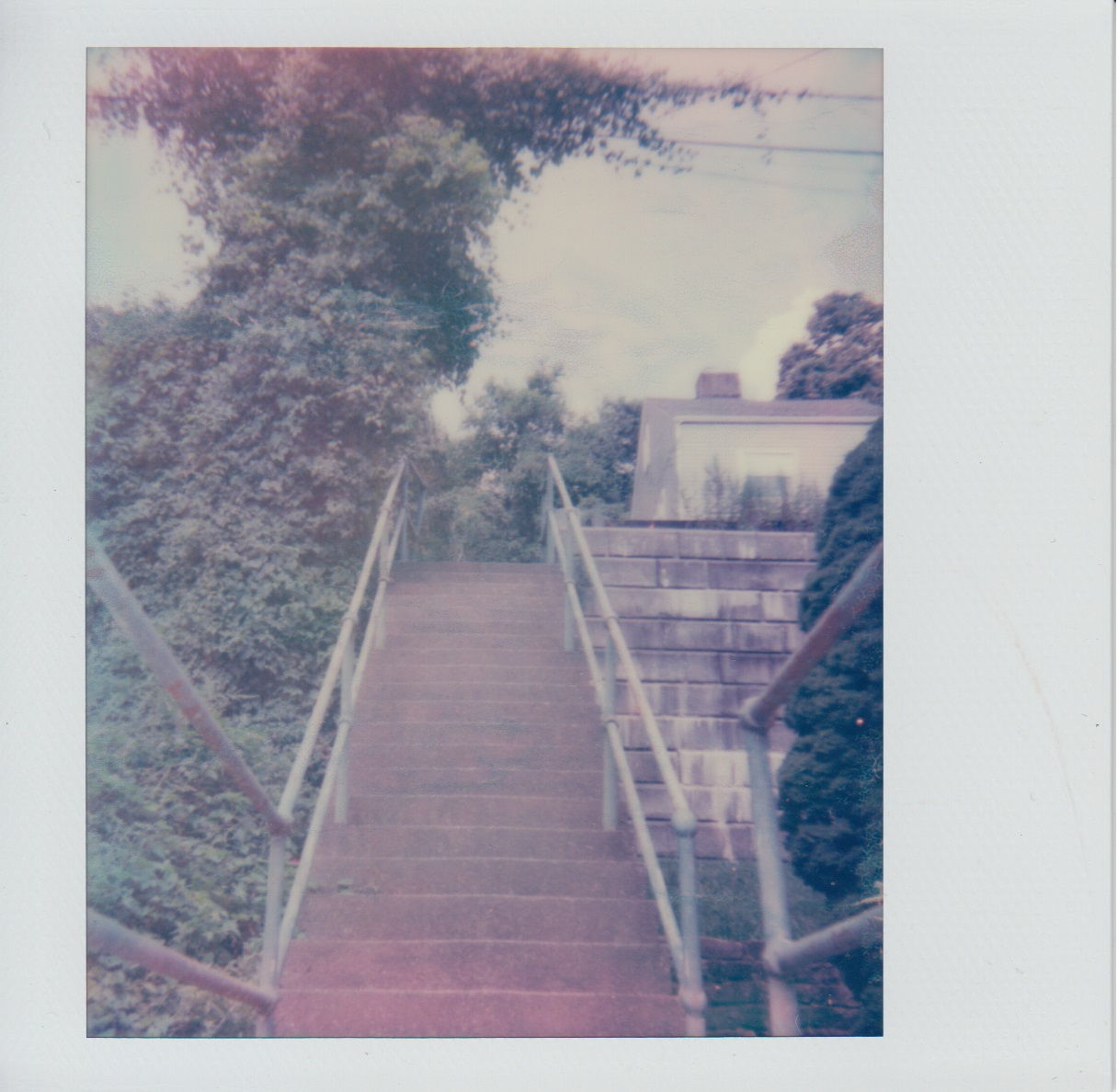
The Dido Way city steps in Hazelwood

== City steps ==
The Hazelwood neighborhood has 18 distinct flights of city steps - many of which are open and in a safe condition. In Hazelwood, the public stairways in Pittsburgh quickly connect pedestrians to public transportation and the Hazelwood Greenway. They also provide an easy way for residents to travel through this hilly area.

== Notable residents ==
- Herb Douglas, Olympian
- The Homeless Gospel Choir, musician, real name Derek Zanetti
- Wiz Khalifa, rapper
- George Patterson, professional basketball player
- Marguerite Pearson, professional baseball player (AAGPBL)
- Madge Skelly, actress, speech pathologist
- August Wilson, playwright; lived in Hazelwood as a teenager
- Chevy Woods, rapper

== See also ==
- List of Pittsburgh neighborhoods
