= Lower St. Clair Township, Allegheny County, Pennsylvania =

Lower St. Clair Township
- Former Township
- Location within the state of Pennsylvania
- Coordinates: 40°24′41″N 79°59′12″W
- Country: United States
- State: Pennsylvania
- County: Allegheny
- Time zone: UTC-5 (Eastern (EST))
  - Summer (DST): UTC-4 (EDT)

Lower St. Clair Township was a township in Allegheny County, Pennsylvania. The township was created by a division of St. Clair Township into Lower St. Clair and Upper St. Clair townships. St. Clair Township was named after Arthur St. Clair, an American Revolutionary War general and president of the Continental Congress.

Lower St. Clair Township originally included the area from Chartiers Creek to Streets Run—including the present-day South Side and other southern neighborhoods of the City of Pittsburgh—and other areas of the South Hills. Lower St. Clair Township was subdivided many times and is no longer in existence. The last remnant of the township, absorbed into the City of Pittsburgh in 1920, is the current St. Clair neighborhood of Pittsburgh.
