= South Side (Pittsburgh) =

- Neighborhoods of Pittsburgh
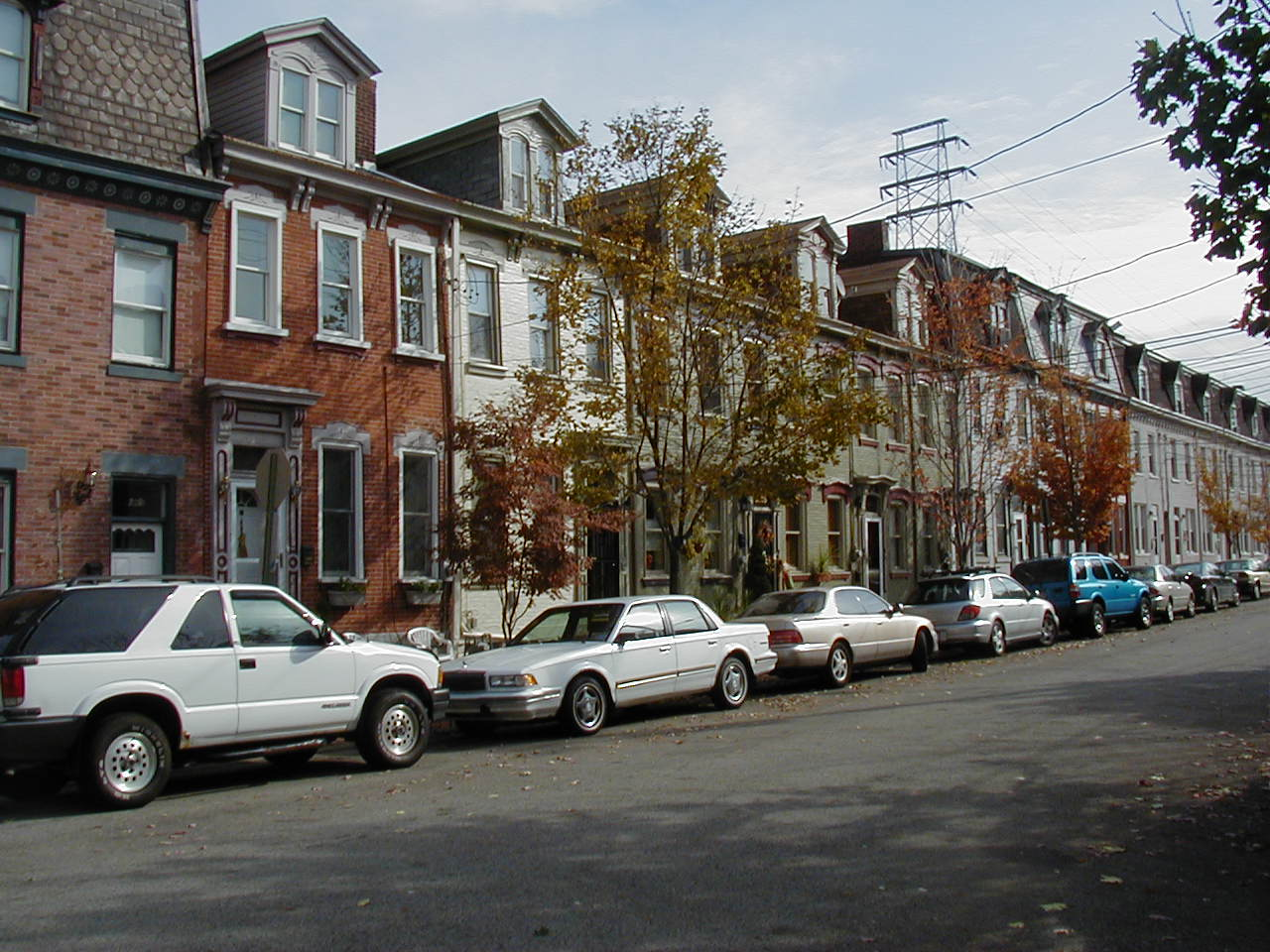
- Southside rowhouses typical of late 19th century.
- Nickname: Sahside
- Location within the state of Pennsylvania
- Coordinates: 40.427°N 79.976°W
- Country: United States
- State: Pennsylvania
- County: Allegheny
- Time zone: UTC-5 (Eastern (EST))
  - Summer (DST): UTC-4 (EDT)

South Side (or "Southside") is an area in Pittsburgh, Pennsylvania, United States, located along the Monongahela River across from Downtown Pittsburgh. The South Side is officially divided into two neighborhoods, South Side Flats and South Side Slopes. Both the Flats and the Slopes are represented on Pittsburgh City Council by Bob Charland. The business district stretches along East Carson Street, which is home to many small shops, restaurants and bars. In 2006, more than 80 bars and pubs operated in the South Side Flats. The neighborhood has an urban fabric with rowhouses.

The South Side is well-connected with public transit. Its proximity and public transit connections also have attracted professionals who work downtown. Pittsburgh Fire Station #24 is located on Mary Street in the neighborhood.

== History ==
The South Side, most of which was originally the village of Birmingham that was annexed to the city in 1872, was settled primarily by German then later Eastern European immigrants who came to Pittsburgh to work in heavy industry. Dr. Nathaniel Bedford planned a large part of Birmingham and named many streets after his friends and family, thus the predominance of streets named after people such as Jane, Sarah, and Carson.

For many years, much of the South Side was dominated by heavy industry and associated service businesses. The Jones and Laughlin Steel Company was located on the South Side but closed in the 1980s and has since been redeveloped. The Pittsburgh Terminal Properties building is located on the west end of Carson Street, next to the Liberty Bridge. When construction finished in 1906, it was the largest warehouse between New York and Chicago. Connections to river, rail, and road transport made it an ideal facility for merchants who sold goods and needed temporary storage. It has since been redeveloped into River Walk Corporate Centre and houses a mix of office and service businesses including Paper Products Company and City Center Self Storage.

In more recent years, the South Side has become home to a larger student population. Many students at Duquesne University, University of Pittsburgh, and Carnegie Mellon University either live in the South Side or spend a portion of their nightlife there. A walk over the South Tenth Street Bridge that crosses the Monongahela River takes students to Duquesne University. Due to the large number of college students and young professionals, in addition to the thriving bar scene, South Side has developed into a nightlife destination for young people in Pittsburgh.

== Economy ==
Important streets in South Side are E. Carson Street, Josephine Street, and S. 18th street. The business district is located along E. Carson Street, which runs the length of South Side. The Birmingham Bridge makes South Side easily accessible from Oakland, which is around 2 miles away from South Side. Station Square is about 1.5 miles west of South Side, and Mt. Washington is 2.5 miles away. The average South Side family income in 2003 was $41,353.

East Carson St. has restaurants, bars, and shops that help support the economy of the South Side. The large variety of shopping along E. Carson Street and SouthSide Works is also a factor in the South Side's economy. There are a variety of locally owned stores and other retailers. The Urban Redevelopment Authority started the SouthSide Works project hoping to create over 6,000 jobs. Today, SouthSide Works has over 10 shopping stores and over 10 restaurants & bars. The restoration of the business district has improved South Sides economy dramatically and house sales have jumped $75,000 in the past 10 years along with vacancy dropping below 10%.

The South Side is also home to a variety of service businesses and reconverted office buildings. Many businesses locate here because rents are less than in Downtown Pittsburgh. The Pittsburgh Terminal Properties building has been converted into River Walk Corporate Center. Tenants are a mix of light industrial (The Paper Company), professional (LDA Architects), and storage for Pittsburgh businesses and residents (City Center Self Storage).

South Side Local Development Company (LDC) helps the economic development in the neighborhood. Under LDC, the Neighborhood Assistance Program was created. The NAP is partners with PNC bank and able to fund programs to create jobs and housing production with their $2.5 million grant. Since 1982, LDC has created over 250 new businesses, renovated over 200 stores, and built over 700 new homes. South Sides redeveloped downtown has increased apartment sales and attracted a lot of nightlife in the neighborhood.

== South Side Flats ==
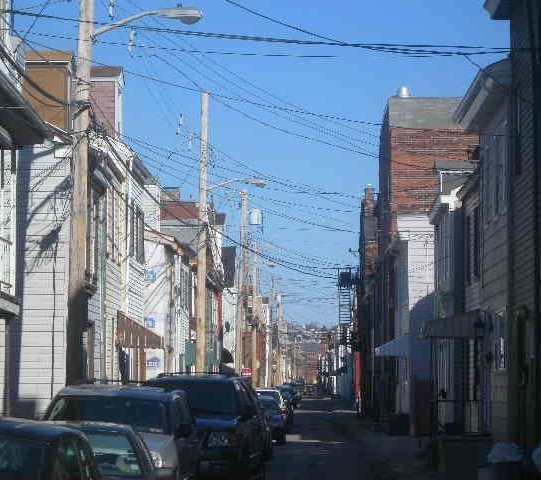
Narrow street

The Flats has one of the largest Victorian main streets in the United States. The entire length of East Carson Street is designated as a historic district. Strict rules dictate what the exterior of the buildings can look like. This neighborhood is a prime example of adaptive reuse of historic structures to spur community revitalization. One of the famous steel mills of Pittsburgh, the Jones and Laughlin Steel Company was located on the South Side but closed in the 1980s and today the land is home to the SouthSide Works shopping and entertainment complex. In the 1980s, this neighborhood was rapidly declining but historic preservation propelled it to a new and bright future. Today, the South Side is a desirable city neighborhood and is known for its multitude of bars and restaurants. The South Side is a popular destination for Pittsburgh residents who seek an entertaining nightlife.

The popularity of the neighborhood has costs. Older, lifelong residents often clash with the values of the young urban professionals and students moving in. Also, parking in the South Side is among the tightest in the city, as narrow streets and high density of buildings leave little empty street space. Nuisance crime has also been a growing issue, but in mid-2018, city leaders announced that crime in the South Side bar district dropped by roughly 30 percent from the previous year, possibly because of the addition of new outdoor security cameras and a larger police patrol presence.

== South Side Slopes ==
The South Side Slopes is the very steep neighborhood located just south of what is traditionally thought of as the South Side but is more appropriately the South Side Flats. Sections of the Slopes are so steep that special fire trucks have to be used to navigate the zigzagging maze of narrow streets. Some spots are so steep that public staircases actually serve as the street. These public steps have street signs and houses located along them.

Public steps are not rare in the hilly city of Pittsburgh. The city has over 700 sets of steps providing access to otherwise unreachable neighborhoods.

== Gallery ==
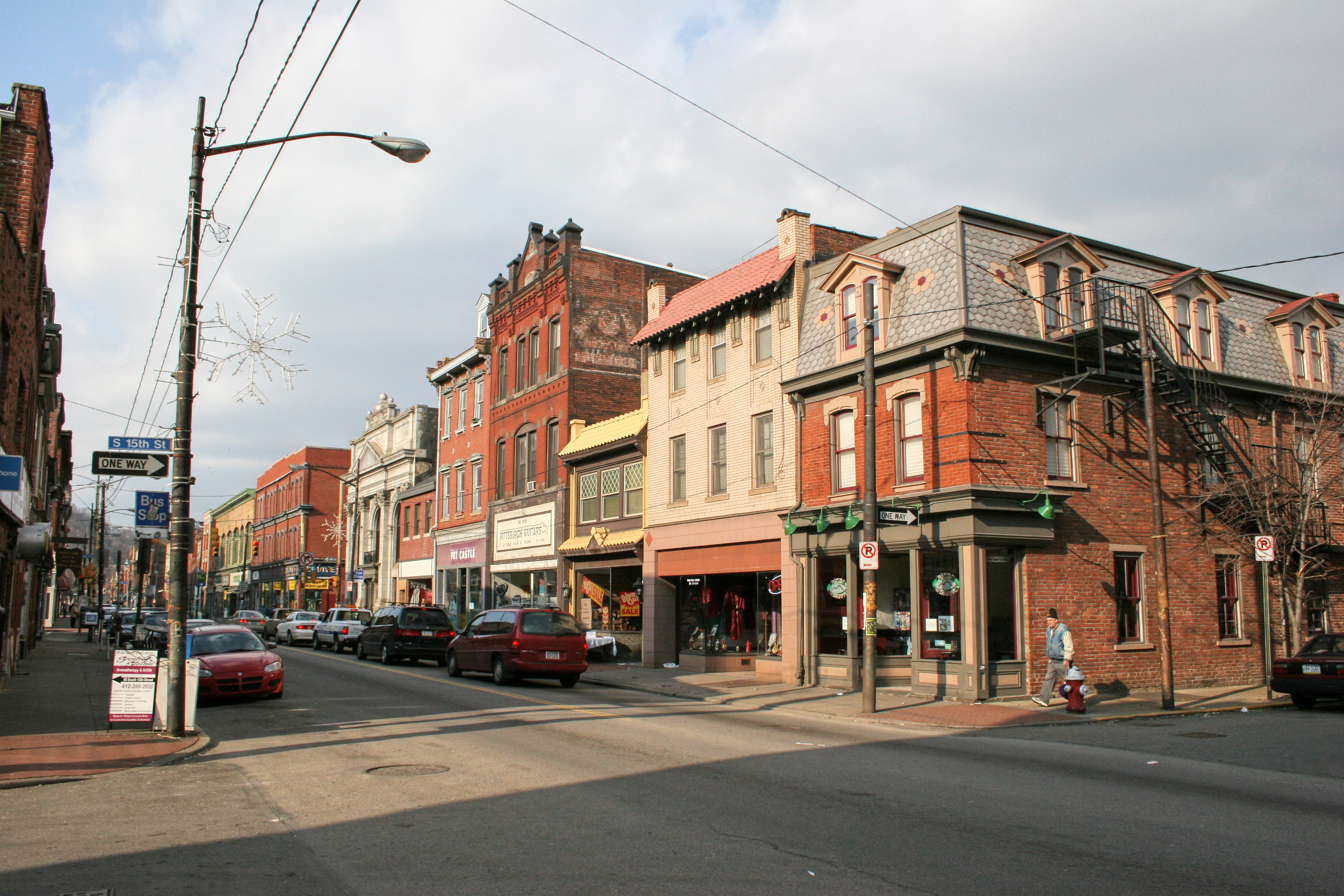
Another view of historic East Carson Street
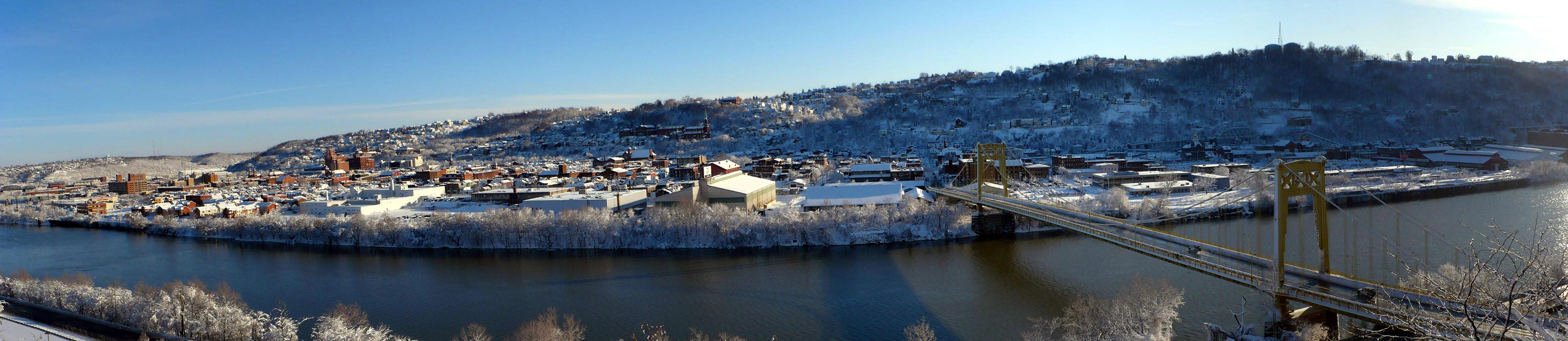
A panoramic view of the South Side (from the Birmingham Bridge on the far left to the Tenth Street Bridge on the right). The photograph was taken from Bluff Street on the campus of Duquesne University in February 2010.

== See also ==
- List of Pittsburgh neighborhoods
- History of Pittsburgh's South Side
