= Mount Washington, Pittsburgh (neighborhood) =

Mount Washington
- Neighborhood of Pittsburgh; Former borough
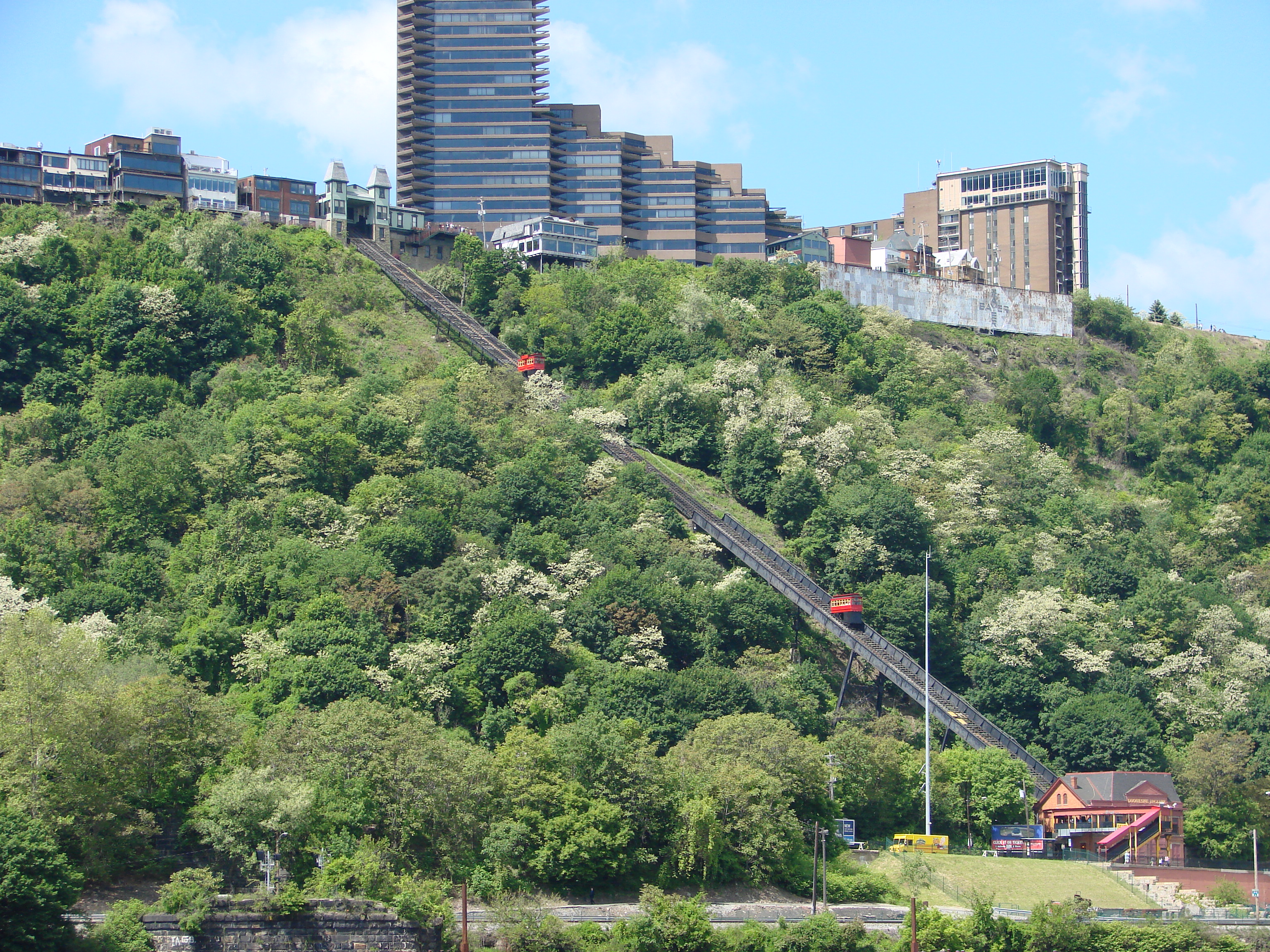
- Mount Washington and the Duquesne Incline

- Coordinates: 40.428°N 80.011°W
- Country: United States
- State: Pennsylvania
- County: Allegheny County
- City: Pittsburgh

Area
  - Total: 1.139 sq mi (2.95 km^{2})

Population (2010)
  - Total: 8,799
  - Density: 7,725/sq mi (2,983/km^{2})

Mount Washington is a neighborhood in the southern region of Pittsburgh, Pennsylvania. It has a Zip Code of 15211 and has representation on Pittsburgh City Council by both the council members for District 3 (Central South Neighborhoods) and District 2 (West Neighborhoods).

It is known for its steep hill overlooking the Pittsburgh skyline, which was rated the most beautiful vista in America by USA Weekend (and the best urban vista); its funiculars, the Duquesne and Monongahela Inclines, which are the oldest continuous inclines in the world; and for the row of upscale restaurants paralleling the crest of Mount Washington, the hill upon which the community sits.

== Chatham Village ==
One of the most notable examples of the early-20th century Garden City Movement communities is on Mount Washington. Chatham Village is a compact neighborhood of townhomes and gardens on the far south end of Mount Washington.

== Services ==
The area is served by the Pittsburgh Bureau of Fire house number 27, equipped with a new 75-foot (23 m) Pierce Quint engine.

== Surrounding Pittsburgh neighborhoods ==
Mount Washington has six Pittsburgh neighborhood borders, including the South Shore at the bottom of the hillside to the north, Allentown to the east, Beltzhoover to the south, Bon Air to the southeast, Beechview to the west and southwest, and Duquesne Heights to the west and northwest.

== See also ==
- List of Pittsburgh neighborhoods
