= List of public schools in Pittsburgh =

This is a list of current and former schools in the Pittsburgh Public Schools district. It includes all of the following:

- Schools inherited from the old Pittsburgh and Allegheny City districts when the current school district was organized in 1911
- Schools inherited from other boroughs and townships which were annexed to the city of Pittsburgh between 1911 and 1930
- Schools built by Pittsburgh Public Schools since 1911

Schools highlighted in green are open as of 2024.

== Pittsburgh sub-district schools ==
Prior to the establishment of the Pittsburgh Board of Public Education in 1911, each ward of the city (apart from the former Allegheny City which had its own school district) had one or more named sub-districts with the authority to levy taxes and build schools within its territory. The schools below were built under the sub-district system and taken over by the Board of Public Education in 1911.

Some sub-districts gave unique names to each school, while others used numbered schools (e.g. Colfax No. 1). The school board renamed all of the numbered schools in 1912.

Image	School	Sub-District	Location	Opened	Closed	Notes
	Allen School	Allen (31st Ward)	Allentown	1891	1961	Replaced by Grandview Elementary. Demolished.
	American Avenue School	Sheraden (43rd Ward)	Sheraden	1901	1959	Replaced by Sheraden Elementary on same site
	Andrews School	Howard (16th Ward)	Bloomfield	1868	1943	Demolished
	Bane School	St. Clair (27th Ward)	South Side Slopes	1895	1961	Replaced by Arlington Elementary. Demolished.
	Baxter School (Brushton No. 3)	Brushton (37th Ward)	Homewood North	1909	n/a	Baxter closed in 1978. Reopened as Student Achievement Center alternative school.
	Bayard School (Washington No. 3)	Washington (17th Ward)	Central Lawrenceville	1874	1939	Replaced by Arsenal Elementary. Now a residential building.
	Bedford School	Bedford (29th Ward)	South Side Flats	1850	1960	Replaced by Phillips Elementary. Used as a special education school from 1958–1960; program moved to Pioneer School. Now a residential building.
	Beechview School	Beechview	Beechview	1905	c. 1932	Demolished in 1943
	Beechwood School	West Liberty (44th Ward)	Beechview	1908	n/a	Now Beechwood PreK–5
	Bellefield School	Oakland (14th Ward)	North Oakland	1865	1957	Replaced by Frick Elementary and subsequently used as a girls' vocational high school. Destroyed by fire in 1957.
	Belmar School	Homewood (21st Ward)	Homewood North	1900	2011	Belmar Elementary closed in 2004. Used as Homewood Montessori (2004-2006) and Lincoln 6-8 (2006–2011). Now vacant.
	Beltzhoover School	Beltzhoover (38th Ward)	Beltzhoover	1905	2004	
	Bennett School (Brushton No. 2)	Brushton (37th Ward)	Homewood South	1900	1955	Demolished
	Birmingham School	Birmingham (28th Ward)	South Side Flats	1870	1943	Now a residential building
	Bon Air School	Bon Air	Bon Air	1902	1954	Replaced by Bon Air Elementary on same site
	Brashear School	St. Clair (27th Ward)	South Side Slopes	1874	1956	Demolished
	Brookline School	West Liberty (44th Ward)	Brookline	1907	n/a	Now Brookline PreK–8
	Browns School	Peebles (23rd Ward)	Squirrel Hill South	1888	1932	Now a residence
	Brushton School (Brushton No. 1)	Brushton (37th Ward)	Homewood South	1892	1943	Demolished
	Cargo School	Mt. Washington (32nd Ward)	Mount Washington	1896	1943	Demolished
	Central High School	n/a	Crawford–Roberts	1871	1933	Replaced by Schenley High. Used as a short-course high school from 1916–1933. Demolished in 1946.
	Chartiers School	Sheraden (43rd Ward)	Chartiers	1904	1939	
	Colfax School (Colfax No. 1)	Colfax (22nd Ward)	Squirrel Hill South	1911	n/a	Now Colfax K–8
	Crescent School	Crescent (41st Ward)	East Hills	1900	1939	Replaced by Crescent Elementary
	Esplen School	Esplen (40th Ward)	Esplen	1889	1953	Now a commercial building
	Fifth Avenue High School	n/a	Uptown	1894	1976	Now a residential building
	Forbes School	Forbes (6th Ward)	Uptown	1885	1973	Demolished
	Fort Pitt School	Hiland (19th Ward)	Garfield	1907	2012	
	Forward School (Colfax No. 3)	Colfax (22nd Ward)	Greenfield	1886	1943	Replaced by Greenfield Elementary; remained open as a kindergarten until 1943. Demolished.
	Stephen C. Foster School (Washington No. 2)	Washington (17th Ward)	Central Lawrenceville	1886	1939	Replaced by Arsenal Elementary. Now a community center.
	Franklin School	Franklin (7th/8th Ward)	Downtown	1890	1940	Demolished in 1940
	Friendship School	Liberty (20th Ward)	Friendship	1900	n/a	Closed in 2006 and reopened in 2008 as Montessori PreK–5.
	Fulton School	Hiland (19th Ward)	Highland Park	1893	n/a	Now Fulton PreK–5
	Garfield School	Hiland (19th Ward)	Garfield	1887	1944	Demolished
	Glenwood School	Peebles (23rd Ward)	Hazelwood	1888	c. 1938	Demolished
	Grant School	Grant (3rd Ward)	Downtown	1852	1927	Destroyed by fire in 1927
	Greenfield School	Peebles (23rd Ward)	Greenfield	1880	1922	Replaced by Greenfield Elementary. Demolished.
	Hancock School	Hancock (5th Ward)	Downtown	1874	1937	Demolished in 1945
	Harwood School	Sheraden (43rd Ward)	Sheraden	1899	1959	Replaced by Sheraden Elementary. Demolished.
	Hazelwood School	Peebles (23rd Ward)	Hazelwood	1872	1938	Replaced by Burgwin Elementary. Demolished.
	Holmes School	Oakland (14th Ward)	South Oakland	1892	1986	Demolished in 1987
	Homewood School	Homewood (21st Ward)	Homewood South	1891	2004	Homewood Elementary closed in 1980. Remained open as Homewood Montessori until 2004; program relocated to Belmar Elementary. Demolished.
	Humboldt School	Humboldt (26th Ward)	South Side Flats	1867	1957	Replaced by Phillips Elementary on same site
	Jefferson School	St. Clair (27th Ward)	South Side Slopes	1873	1939	Demolished
	Knox School	Knox (30th Ward)	South Side Slopes	1874	1940	Demolished in 1940
	Larimer School	Lincoln (21st Ward)	Larimer	1896	1980	Now a residential building
	Lawrence School	Lawrence (15th Ward)	Lower Lawrenceville	1871	1939	Replaced by Arsenal Elementary. Now a brewery.
	Lee School	West Liberty (44th Ward)	Beechview	1910	1980	
	Lemington School	Lincoln (21st Ward)	Lincoln–Lemington–Belmar	1888	1938	Replaced by Lemington Elementary on same site
	Letsche School	Franklin (7th/8th Ward)	Crawford–Roberts	1905	2004	Letsche Elementary closed in 1975. Used as an alternative school until 2004.
	Liberty School	Liberty (20th Ward)	Shadyside	1870	1936	Demolished in 1936
	Liberty Manual Training School	Liberty (20th Ward)	Shadyside	1912†	n/a	Became an elementary-junior high school in 1936. Now Liberty K–5.
	Lincoln School	Lincoln (21st Ward)	Larimer	1869	1931	Replaced by Lincoln Elementary on same site
	Linden School	Sterrett (22nd Ward)	Point Breeze	1903	n/a	Now Linden K–5
	J. M. Logan School	Peebles (23rd Ward)	Greenfield	1897	c. 1944	Demolished c. 1944
	Luckey School (Luckey No. 1)	Luckey (35th Ward)	West End	1877	1939	Replaced by Whittier Elementary. Demolished.
	Madison School (Minersville No. 5)	Minersville (13th Ward)	Upper Hill	1891	2006	
	Margaretta School	Hiland (19th Ward)	East Liberty	1902	1915	Replaced by Dilworth and James E. Rogers Elementary. Building was taken over by Peabody High and is now part of Obama 6–12.
	McCandless School	Mt. Albion (18th Ward)	Upper Lawrenceville	1881	c. 1944	Demolished c. 1944
	McCleary School	Mt. Albion (18th Ward)	Upper Lawrenceville	1900	2006	Now a residential building
	McKee School	Howard (16th Ward)	Lower Lawrenceville	1868	1932	Demolished in 1942
	Miller School (Moorhead No. 2)	Moorhead (11th Ward)	Crawford–Roberts	1905	c. 2008	Relocated to McKelvy Elementary
	Minersville School (Minersville No. 1)	Minersville (13th Ward)	Terrace Village	1859	1942	Replaced by Weil Elementary. Demolished in 1942.
	Monongahela School	Monongahela (33rd Ward)	South Shore	1859	1914	Demolished
	Montooth School	Montooth (42nd Ward)	Beltzhoover	1893	1938	Demolished
	Moorhead School (Moorhead No. 1)	Moorhead (11th Ward)	Crawford–Roberts	1868	1942	Demolished in 1942
	Morningside School	Mt. Albion (18th Ward)	Morningside	1897	2006	Now a residential building
	Samuel F. B. Morse School	Morse (25th Ward)	South Side Flats	1874	1980	Now a residential building
	Mt. Albion School	Mt. Albion (18th Ward)	Upper Lawrenceville	1874	1938	Demolished
	North School	North (4th Ward)	Downtown	1894	1936	Elementary school closed in 1912 and subsequently used as an industrial and continuation school. Demolished after being damaged in the Pittsburgh flood of 1936.
	O'Hara School	O'Hara (12th Ward)	Strip District	1855	1943	Demolished in 1944
	Obama 6–12 (Peabody High School)	n/a	East Liberty	1911	n/a	Peabody High closed in 2011. Reopened in 2017 as Obama 6–12.
	Osceola School	Liberty (20th Ward)	Bloomfield	1889	1962	Demolished in 1962
	Park Place School	Sterrett (22nd Ward)	Point Breeze	1903	1979	
	Penn School (Minersville No. 2)	Minersville (13th Ward)	Polish Hill	1892	1956	Demolished
	Prospect School	Mt. Washington (32nd Ward)	Mount Washington	1871	1932	Replaced by Prospect Elementary on same site
	Ralston School	Ralston (9th/10th Ward)	Strip District	1860	1932	Demolished
	Riverside School	Riverside (34th Ward)	South Shore	1882	1923	Replaced by Langley High. Demolished.
	Roosevelt School	Peebles (23rd Ward)	Greenfield	1905	1957	Replaced by Minadeo Elementary. Demolished.
	Rose School (Minersville No. 4)	Minersville (13th Ward)	Terrace Village	1892	1942	Replaced by Weil Elementary. Demolished.
	Shakespeare School	Liberty (20th Ward)	Shadyside	1894	1956	Demolished in 1956
	Snodgrass School (Luckey No. 2)	Luckey (35th Ward)	Duquesne Heights	1877	1939	Replaced by Whittier Elementary. Demolished in 1942.
	Soho School	Oakland (14th Ward)	South Oakland	1870	1958	Demolished
	Somers School (Minersville No. 3)	Minersville (13th Ward)	Middle Hill	1887	1950	Became a trade school in 1928. Demolished.
	South School	South (2nd Ward)	Downtown	1849	1913	Demolished in 1929 to clear site for Allegheny County Office Building
	South High School	n/a	South Side Flats	1897	2004	Became South Vocational–Technical High School in 1982. Now a residential building.
	Springfield School	Springfield (12th Ward)	Strip District	1871	1934	Now a residential building
	Squirrel Hill School	Peebles (23rd Ward)	Hazelwood	1882	1915	Demolished
	Sterrett School	Sterrett (22nd Ward)	Point Breeze	1899	n/a	Now Sterrett 6–8
	Thaddeus Stevens School	Stevens (36th Ward)	West End	1893		Demolished in 1940
	Sunnyside School	Mt. Albion (18th Ward)	Stanton Heights	1910		Demolished
	Swisshelm School (Colfax No. 4)	Colfax (22nd Ward)	Swisshelm Park	1904	1975	Demolished
	Washington School (Washington No. 1)	Washington (17th Ward)	Central Lawrenceville	1868		Demolished
	Washington Industrial School	Washington (17th Ward)	Central Lawrenceville	1909	2006	Now a hotel
	West Liberty School	West Liberty (44th Ward)	Brookline	1898	1939	Replaced by West Liberty Elementary. Demolished.
	Westlake School	Westlake (39th Ward)	Elliott	1885		Demolished
	Whittier School	Mt. Washington (32nd Ward)	Mount Washington	1889	1939	Replaced by Whittier Elementary. Demolished.
	Wickersham School	Wickersham (24th Ward)	South Side Flats	1883	1949	Demolished
	Thomas Wightman School (Colfax No. 5)	Colfax (22nd Ward)	Squirrel Hill South	1898	1980	
	Woolslair School	Howard (16th Ward)	Bloomfield	1897	n/a	Now Woolslair K–5

†Work began prior to school district consolidation

== Allegheny schools ==
These schools were built by the Allegheny City (North Side) school district and taken over by the Board of Public Education in 1911.

Image	School	Ward	Location	Opened	Closed	Notes
	Allegheny High School	n/a	Allegheny Center	1888	n/a	Now Allegheny PreK–5 and Allegheny 6–8
	City View School (14th Ward No. 2)	14	Spring Hill–City View	1890	1930	Now a funeral home
	Clayton School (2nd Ward No. 3)	2	Perry South	1889		Demolished
	Columbus School (2nd Ward No. 2)	2	Perry South	1873	1952	Destroyed by fire in 1952. Replaced by Columbus Middle School on same site.
	John M. Conroy School (5th Ward)	5	Manchester	1886	n/a	Now Conroy Education Center
	John M. Conroy Industrial School (5th Ward Industrial)	5	Manchester	1895	n/a	Now Conroy Education Center
	Mary J. Cowley School (2nd Ward No. 1)	2	Central Northside	1895	1973	Replaced by King Elementary. Demolished in 1974.
	Duquesne School (8th Ward)	8	Troy Hill	1884		Demolished
	East Park School (4th Ward No. 1)	4	East Allegheny	1869	1974	Replaced by King Elementary. Demolished.
	East Street School (12th Ward No. 1)	12	Spring Hill–City View	1886	1973	Replaced by King Elementary. Demolished.
	Fineview School (12th Ward No. 2)	12	Fineview	1906	1973	Replaced by King Elementary. Demolished in 1974.
	Fineview Industrial School	12	Fineview	1877		Demolished in 1942.
	Halls Grove School (15th Ward No. 2)	15	Marshall-Shadeland	1890	1983	Halls Grove Elementary closed in 1975. Remained in use as an alternative school until 1983.
	Irwin Ave. Industrial School (2nd Ward Industrial)	2	Perry South	1904		Demolished
	Latimer School (3rd Ward No. 1)	3	East Allegheny	1901	1974	Now a residential building
	Linwood School (10th Ward No. 1)	10	Perry South	1872		Demolished
	Lockhart School (4th Ward No. 2)	4	East Allegheny	1868	1939	Replaced by Schiller Elementary. Demolished.
	Longfellow School (14th Ward No. 1)	14	Northview Heights	1899	1960	Demolished
	Manchester School (6th Ward)	6	Chateau	1870	1964	Replaced by Manchester Elementary. Demolished.
	Manchester Industrial School (6th Ward Industrial)	6	Chateau	1909		Demolished
	Horace Mann School (11th Ward No. 1)	11	Marshall-Shadeland	1874	2006	
	McNaugher School (10th Ward No. 4)	10	Perry South	1908	1983	
	Milroy School (10th Ward No. 2)	10	Perry North	1880	1939	
	John Morrow School (11th Ward No. 2)	11	Perry North	1895	n/a	Now Morrow PreK–8 Primary Campus
	Perry School (15th Ward No. 1)	15	Perry North	1901	n/a	Expanded with a new building in 1923. Now Perry High School.
	Schiller School (3rd Ward No. 2)	3	East Allegheny	1871	1939	Replaced by Schiller Elementary. Demolished.
	Spring Garden School (7th Ward No. 1)	7	Spring Garden	1879	1939	Replaced by Spring Garden Elementary. Demolished.
	Spring Hill School (7th Ward No. 2)	7	Spring Hill–City View	1896	n/a	Now Spring Hill K–5
	Troy Hill School (13th Ward)	13	Troy Hill	1885	1960	Demolished
	Valley School (10th Ward No. 3)	10	Perry South	1894		Demolished
	Daniel Webster School (1st Ward)	1	North Shore	1875		Demolished
	Daniel Webster Industrial School (1st Ward Industrial)	1	North Shore	1900		Demolished
	Woods Run School (9th Ward)	9	Marshall-Shadeland	1873		Demolished

== Other district schools ==
These schools were built by various borough and township school districts which were annexed into the city of Pittsburgh after 1911.

Image	School	District	Location	Opened	Closed	Notes
	Banksville School	Union Township (Annexed 1928)	Banksville	1872	1936	Replaced by Banksville Elementary on same site
	Becks Run School	St. Clair (Annexed 1923)	Arlington	1899	1934	Now a commercial building
	Bell School	Chartiers Township (Annexed 1921)	East Carnegie	1876	1935	Demolished
	Carrick High School	Carrick (Annexed 1927)	Carrick	1924	n/a	
	Concord School	Carrick (Annexed 1927)	Carrick	1906	1939	Replaced by Concord Elementary. Demolished.
	East Carnegie School	Chartiers Township (Annexed 1921)	East Carnegie	1908	1971	Demolished
	Fairview School (Overbrook No. 1)	Overbrook (Annexed 1930)	Overbrook	1907	1974	Demolished in 1976
	Hays School	Hays (Annexed 1929)	Hays	1909	1973	Now a commercial building
	Knoxville Junior High School	Knoxville (Annexed 1927)	Knoxville	1927†	2006	
	Knoxville School (Knoxville No. 1)	Knoxville (Annexed 1927)	Knoxville	c. 1880	1943	Knoxville School closed in 1927. Remained in use as Rochelle Elementary Annex until 1943. Building was later demolished.
	Oak School (Overbrook No. 2)	Overbrook (Annexed 1930)	Brookline	1908	1943	Demolished
	Oakwood School	Chartiers Township (Annexed 1921)	Oakwood	1915	1970	Demolished
	Obey School	Chartiers Township (Annexed 1921)	Crafton Heights	1915	1938	Now a commercial building
	Overbrook Junior High School (Overbrook Central)	Overbrook (Annexed 1930)	Overbrook	1928	2003	
	Rochelle Elementary School (Knoxville Union High School, Knoxville No. 2)	Knoxville (Annexed 1927)	Knoxville	1897	1954	Knoxville Union High closed in 1927 and reopened as Rochelle Elementary
	Quentin Roosevelt School	Carrick (Annexed 1927)	Carrick	1903	1958	Replaced by Roosevelt Elementary on same site
	Nathan C. Schaeffer School	Chartiers Township (Annexed 1921)	Crafton Heights	1908	1960	Replaced by Schaeffer Elementary. Demolished.
	Spring Lane School	St. Clair (Annexed 1923)	Arlington	c. 1884	1961	Replaced by Arlington Elementary
	Terrace School	Chartiers Township (Annexed 1921)	Westwood	1903	1925	Now a residence
	Westwood School	Westwood (Annexed 1927)	Westwood	1908	1958	Replaced by Westwood Elementary. Demolished in 1958.
	Windgap School	Chartiers Township (Annexed 1921)	Windgap	1903	1939	Now a residence

†Work began prior to school district annexation

== Pittsburgh Public Schools (post-1911) ==
Image	School	Location	Opened	Closed	Notes
	Taylor Allderdice High School	Squirrel Hill South	1927	n/a	
	Arlington Elementary School	Arlington	1961	2016	Relocated to Murray Elementary in 2016. Building is now New Academy Charter School.
	Arlington Middle School	Arlington	1996	2004	Located in former St. Henry parochial school
	Arlington PreK–8 (Philip Murray Elementary School)	Mount Oliver	1955	n/a	Closed in 2012. Reopened in 2016 as Arlington PreK–8.
	Arsenal Junior High School	Lower Lawrenceville	1932	n/a	Now Arsenal PreK–5 and Arsenal 6–8
	Banksville Elementary School	Banksville	1936	n/a	Now Banksville K–5
	Boggs Avenue Elementary School	Mount Washington	1925	1985	
	Bon Air Elementary School	Bon Air	1956	2006	
	Brashear High School	Beechview	1976	n/a	
	Burgwin Elementary School	Hazelwood	1937	2006	Now Propel Hazelwood charter school
	Alice M. Carmalt Elementary School	Overbrook	1937	n/a	Now Carmalt PreK–8
	Chartiers Elementary School	Windgap	1959	2004	Now Chartiers Early Childhood Center.
	Chatham Elementary School	Perry North	1924	2006	
	Classical Academy 6–8 (Greenway Middle School)	Crafton Heights	1974	n/a	Greenway closed in 2006. Reopened as Classical Academy 6–8.
	Clayton Academy (Clayton Elementary School)	Perry South	1958	n/a	Clayton Elementary closed in 2006 and reopened as Clayton Academy alternative school
	Columbus Middle School	Perry South	1967	2006	Now Propel Northside charter school
	Concord Elementary School	Carrick	1939	n/a	Now Concord K–5
	Clifford B. Connelley Vocational High School	Crawford-Roberts	1930	2004	Now Energy Innovation Center
	Creative and Performing Arts (CAPA) 6–12	Downtown	1979	n/a	
	Crescent Elementary School	East Hills	1939	2006	
	H. B. Davis Elementary School	Squirrel Hill South	1932	1980	Demolished in 1984.
	Dilworth Elementary School	East Liberty	1915	n/a	Now Dilworth PreK–5
	East Hills Elementary School	East Hills	1972	2006	
	Helen S. Faison Elementary School	Homewood South	2004	n/a	Now Faison K–5
	Gladstone Elementary School	Hazelwood	1914	2001	Was also a high school from 1960 to 1976.
	Grandview Elementary School	Allentown	1961	n/a	Now Grandview PreK–5
	Greenfield Elementary School	Greenfield	1922	n/a	Now Greenfield PreK–8
	Martin Luther King Jr. Elementary School	Allegheny Center	1973	n/a	Now King PreK–8
	Samuel P. Langley High School	Sheraden	1923	n/a	Now Langley K–8
	Lemington Elementary School	Lincoln–Lemington–Belmar	1938	2006	
	Lincoln Elementary School	Larimer	1932	n/a	Now Lincoln PreK–5
	Manchester Elementary School	Manchester	1964	n/a	Now Manchester PreK–8
	Mifflin Elementary School	Lincoln Place	1932	n/a	Now Mifflin PreK–8
	Miller PreK–5 (William H. McKelvy Elementary School)	Bedford Dwellings	1916	n/a	McKelvy Elementary closed in 2001. Reopened c. 2008 as Miller PreK–5.
	Margaret Milliones 6–12 (Herron Hill Junior High School)	Upper Hill	1928	n/a	Renamed Milliones Middle School in 1978. Closed in 2006 and reopened in 2008 as Milliones 6-12 (University Prep).
	John Minadeo Elementary School	Squirrel Hill South	1957	n/a	Now Minadeo PreK–5
	Northview Heights Elementary School	Northview Heights	1962	2012	
	David B. Oliver Citywide Academy (Oliver High School)	Marshall-Shadeland	1925	n/a	Oliver High closed in 2012 and reopened as Oliver Citywide Academy special-ed school
	Phillips Elementary School	South Side Flats	1958	n/a	Now Phillips K–5
	Pioneer Education Center	Brookline	1960	n/a	Special-ed school
	Prospect Junior High School	Mount Washington	1931	2006	
	Regent Square Elementary School	Regent Square	1928	2004	Now Environmental Charter School 3–5
	Florence Reizenstein Middle School	Shadyside	1975	2008	Used as Schenley High (2008–2011) and Obama 6-12 (2009–2012). Demolished in 2013.
	James E. Rogers Elementary School	East Liberty	1915	2009	Now Environmental Charter School 6–8
	Arthur J. Rooney Sr. Middle School	Brighton Heights	1997	2010	Located in former St. John Hospital. Now Morrow 6–8 Intermediate Campus.
	Quentin Roosevelt Elementary School	Carrick	1959	n/a	Now Roosevelt PreK–5 Primary Campus
	Schaeffer Elementary School	Crafton Heights	1960	2012	
	Schenley High School	North Oakland	1912	2011	The Schenley building was closed in 2008, but the name continued to be used at a different location until the last class of existing students graduated in 2011.
	Schiller Elementary School	East Allegheny	1939	n/a	Now Schiller 6–8
	Science and Technology Academy (Henry Clay Frick Elementary)	North Oakland	1927	n/a	Became Frick Middle School in 1980. Closed in 2009 and reopened as Science and Technology Academy.
	Sheraden Elementary School	Sheraden	1959	2006	
	South Brook Middle School	Brookline	2001	n/a	Now South Brook 6–8
	South Hills High School	Mount Washington	1917	1986	
	South Hills Middle School	Beechview	1996	n/a	Now South Hills 6–8
	South Vocational-Technical High School	South Side Flats	1940	1964	Merged into South High
	Spring Garden Elementary School	Troy Hill	1939	2004	Now Spring Garden Early Childhood Center
	Thaddeus Stevens Elementary School	Elliott	1939	2012	
	Sunnyside Elementary School	Stanton Heights	1954	n/a	Now Sunnyside PreK–8
	Robert Lee Vann Elementary School (Watt Elementary)	Middle Hill	1915	2010	Now St. Benedict the Moor School
	A. Leo Weil Elementary School	Middle Hill	1942	n/a	Now Weil PreK–5
	West Liberty Elementary School	Brookline	1939	n/a	Now West Liberty K–5
	West Side Traditional Academy (Fairywood Elementary School)	Fairywood	1922	2001	Fairywood Elementary closed in 1982. Reopened in 1990 as West Side Traditional Academy.
	Westinghouse High School	Homewood West	1912	n/a	Now Westinghouse Academy 6–12
	Westwood Elementary School	Westwood	1958	n/a	Now Westwood K–5
	Whittier Elementary School	Duquesne Heights	1939	n/a	Now Whittier K–5
