= Pittsburgh Bureau of Fire =

Fire department in Pittsburgh, Pennsylvania, US

Operational area
- Country: United States
- State: Pennsylvania
- City: Pittsburgh

Agency overview
- Established: September 12, 1793
- Annual calls: 65,236 (2012)
- Employees: 670
- Staffing: Career
- Fire chief: Mathew Davis (Acting)
- EMS level: BLS
- IAFF: 1

Facilities and equipment
- Divisions: 3
- Battalions: 4
- Stations: 30
- Engines: 28
- Trucks: 11
- Rescues: 0
- Ambulances: 0
- HAZMAT: 2
- USAR: 1
- Fireboats: 1
- Light and air: 2

Website
- Official website
- www.pittsburghfirefighters.org

The Pittsburgh Bureau of Fire (PBF) provides fire suppression and prevention for the City of Pittsburgh, as well as BLS response on medical details. In all, the bureau is responsible for 55.5 square miles (144 km^{2}) with a population of 305,841 as of the 2013 Census estimation. The Bureau was the first fire department in the United States to unionize and thus has the International Association of Fire Fighters (IAFF) local number of 1.

The Fire Bureau provides fire and rescue services to the Borough of Wilkinsburg and Ingram Borough.

== History ==
The Bureau started out as a volunteer fire department and officially transitioned to a fully paid department on May 23, 1870. Over 30 years later in 1903 a group of Pittsburgh firefighters sought to improve working and living conditions of those serving in the department. They formed an association known as the City Fireman's Protective Association. By September 1903, the first International Association of Fire Fighters union was organized, IAFF Local No. 1.

== Stations and apparatus ==
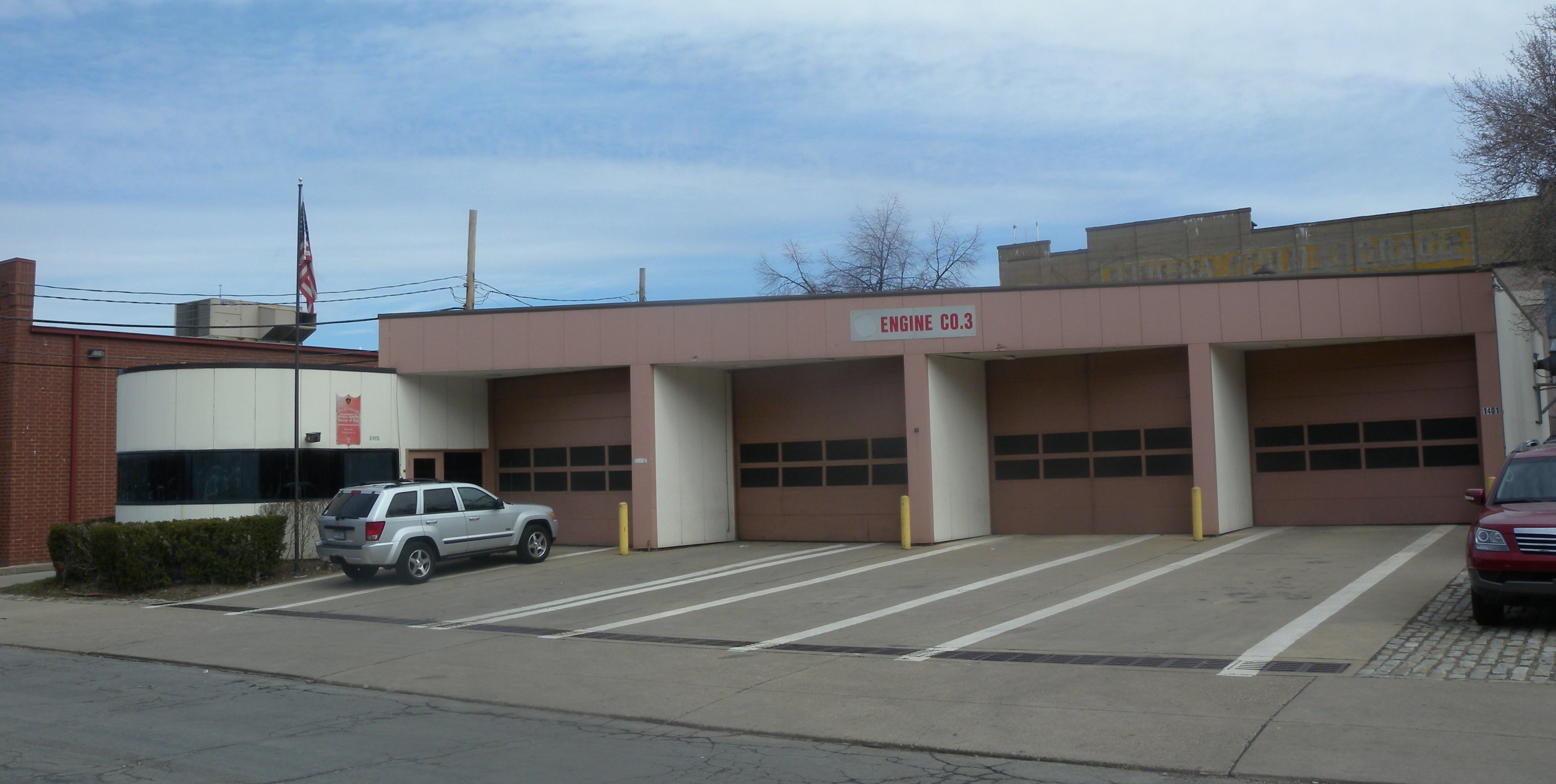
The quarters of Engine 3 in the Strip District

Below is a complete listing of all fire station and apparatus locations in the city of Pittsburgh according to Battalion.

| Fire Station Number | Neighborhood | Engine Company | Truck Company | Special Unit (Note: Water rescue, Hazmat and Medic units are EMS Division apparatus quartered at Fire Stations.) | Deputy Chief or Battalion Chief Unit | Battalion |
|---|---|---|---|---|---|---|
| 3 | Strip District | Engine 3 | | M.A.C. 1, M.A.C. 2 | | 2 |
| 4 | Uptown | Engine 4 | Truck 4 | Command Unit 200 | Deputy Chief | 2 |
| 6 | Lawrenceville | Engine 6 | Truck 6 | Water Rescue Raft, Foam Trailer | | 3 |
| 7 | Stanton Heights | Engine 7 | | Arson Unit 1, Arson Unit 2, Arson Unit 3 | | 3 |
| 8 | East Liberty | Engine 8 | Truck 8 | | Battalion Chief 3 | 3 |
| 10 | Hill District | Engine 10 | | PEMS Medic 5 | | 2 |
| 12 | Greenfield | Engine 12 | | PEMS Medic 7 | | 2 |
| 13 | Hazelwood | Engine 13 | Truck 13 | | | 2 |
| 14 | Oakland | | Truck 14 | | Battalion Chief 2 | 2 |
| 15 | Lincoln-Lemington | Engine 15 | | Foam Unit 15 | | 3 |
| 16 | Wilkinsburg | Engine 16 | | | | 3 |
| 17 | Homewood | Engine 17 | Truck 17 | Water Rescue Raft | | 3 |
| 18 | Squirrel Hill | Engine 18 | | PBP Zone 4, Foam Unit 18 | | 2 |
| 19 | Swisshelm Park | Engine 19 | | | | 3 |
| 20 | Hays | Engine 20 | | PEMS Medic 12 | | 4 |
| 22 | Arlington | Engine 22 | | | | 4 |
| 23 | Carrick | Engine 23 | | Foam 1 | | 4 |
| 24 | South Side | Engine 24 | Truck 24 | Water Rescue Raft, Utility 4 | Battalion Chief 4 | 4 |
| 26 | Brookline | Engine 26 | Truck 26 | | | 4 |
| 27 | Mt. Washington | Engine 27 | | | | 4 |
| 28 | Beechview | Engine 28 | | | | 4 |
| 29 | Westwood | Engine 29 | | | | 4 |
| 30 | Elliott | Engine 30 | Truck 30 | | | 1 |
| 31 | Sheraden | Engine 31 | | | | 1 |
| 32 | Deutschtown | Engine 32 | Truck 32 | Haz-Mat 3 | | 1 |
| 33 | Woods Run | | Truck 33 | | | 1 |
| 34 | Observatory Hill | Engine 34 | | | | 1 |
| 35 | Brighton Heights | Engine 35 | | | | 1 |
| 37 | Manchester | Engine 37 | | Haz-Mat 1 | Battalion Chief 1 | 1 |
| 38 | Northview Heights | Engine 38 | | | | 1 |

== In pop culture ==
- Sudden Death - A Pittsburgh firefighter is portrayed by Jean-Claude Van Damme.

== See also ==
- Great Fire of Pittsburgh
