= West End (Pittsburgh) =

West End West End Valley (formerly Temperanceville)
- Neighborhood of Pittsburgh
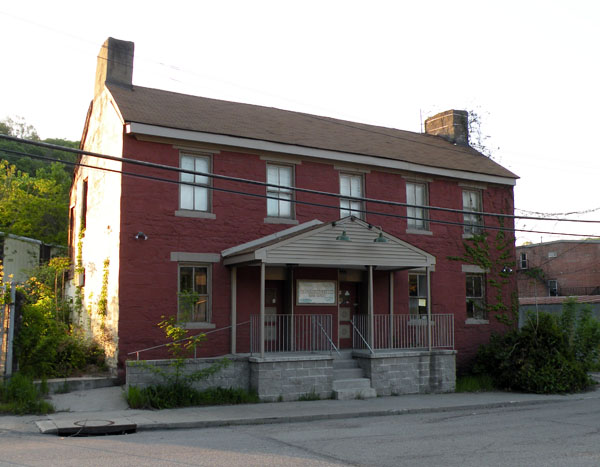
- The Old Stone Inn located at 434 Greentree Road, possibly circa 1756, may be one of the oldest buildings in the region.

- Coordinates: 40.4355°N 80.0351°W
- Country: United States
- State: Pennsylvania
- County: Allegheny County
- City: Pittsburgh

Area
  - Total: 0.2 sq mi (0.52 km^{2})

Population (2010)
  - Total: 254
  - Density: 1,300/sq mi (490/km^{2})
- ZIP Code: 15220

Historical population
Year	Pop.	±%
1940	1,984	—
1950	1,820	−8.3%
1960	1,702	−6.5%
1970	920	−45.9%
1980	604	−34.3%
1990	441	−27.0%
2000	466	+5.7%
2010	254	−45.5%
Source: University of Pittsburgh

West End Village (originally named Temperanceville) is a neighborhood in Pittsburgh, Pennsylvania's west city area. It has a zip code of 15220, and has representation on Pittsburgh City Council by the council member for District 2 (West Neighborhoods).

The neighborhood lies in a small valley south of the Ohio River and less than a mile from downtown Pittsburgh. Temperanceville was founded as a dry town and was annexed to the City of Pittsburgh in 1874. To support neighborhood businesses, the Urban Redevelopment Authority added the West End Village as a Mainstreet Pittsburgh district in 2009. The West End Bridge crosses the Ohio River and connects the neighborhood to the North Side of the city. Carson St. connects it to Station Square and the South Side to the east, and the borough of McKees Rocks to the west.

== Region ==
The term "West End" is also used to refer to the surrounding region, which includes the West End Valley in addition to western neighborhoods Sheraden, Elliott, Windgap, Esplen, Ridgemont, Westwood, Oakwood, East Carnegie, Chartiers City, Fairywood, Crafton Heights, and Banksville. The West End of Pittsburgh is mostly residential, with some industry and a relative paucity of commercial districts in comparison to the rest of the city. The West End region has few notable tourist attractions other than the West End Overlook, a small hilltop park in the Elliott neighborhood that offers an excellent view of the Golden Triangle (Downtown Pittsburgh).

The term "West End" is often mistakenly used to refer to the area southwest of the Ohio River. Upon annexation, the City of Pittsburgh renamed the Borough of Temperanceville as West End; Temperanceville was its own entity (incorporated 1860) on the valley floor through which Saw Mill Run flows toward the Ohio River, between the Coal Hill end of Mt. Washington upriver, and River Hill downriver (site of the Elliott bluff lookout, a.k.a. the West End Overlook (c.1961)/West End-Elliott Overlook (c.2004) the top of which is in a neighborhood corner of the (annexed) community of Elliott.

The Pittsburgh southwest communities are essentially residential areas supported by local businesses, with ready access to the rest of the city and surrounding areas and highway systems. Over the past 30+ years the West End neighborhood (Temperanceville) has suffered the demolition of much indigenous residential architecture and the removal of most of its tenant units from the rental market, displacing a once substantial multicultural low-middle-fixed income population in favor of attempts to attract business.

The West End has three designated historic landmark buildings: the German (now Jerusalem Baptist) Church, the 1899 Carnegie Branch Library (spoken for by Andrew Carnegie himself, 2nd in the Pittsburgh Carnegie system, and home of the first Library Story Hour anywhere), and the Old Stone Tavern, which may pre-date the Fort Pitt Blockhouse as the oldest building west of the Alleghenies.

The "overlook" (once one of the most-visited sites in Allegheny County) has drawn fewer visitors since 2004, when a 2.5 million dollar park improvement eliminated historically available vehicle access to the bluff-top, thereby impacting all-season visiting. Elliott and Crafton Heights also share the Obey House (1823), a prime historical example of a "road house" on the Steubenville Pike (the land route West from Pittsburgh.)

== Highways ==
=== West End Bypass / Banksville Circle ===
The West End Bypass is a 1.1 stretch of highway (designated as Saw Mill Run Blvd/U.S. 19, PA 51), running from the West End exit interchange on the Penn Lincoln Parkway (Exit 69C) to the West End Circle. When this bypass opened in 1951, its South Hills connector was the Banksville Circle, a predecessor thoroughfare to the Parkway and Fort Pitt Tunnels. This circle provided direct access to the West End via Woodville Avenue. It was removed by the late 1950s with the construction of the Penn Lincoln Parkway. However, the Woodville Avenue connector still exists, accessible via Parkway Exit 69C and Carnegie/Airport exit from the West End Bypass.

=== West End Circle ===
The West End Circle is the circumference of traffic south of the West End Bridge, brought together by the West End Bypass (see above), South Main Street (PA Route 60—southern terminus), Steuben Street, and West Carson Street (PA 51/PA 837—northern terminus). The Norfolk Southern railway overpass (formerly Pennsylvania Railroad) runs straight through the circle, and Wheeling & Lake Erie Railroad ran across Steuben Street, across a trestle and alongside the West End Bypass.

A complete reconfiguration of the West End Circle started in October 2007, including new bridges and new improved connectors. A new underpass was dug under the Norfolk Southern Railroad for straight access to the West End Bridge northbound and West End Bypass southbound. The West End segment of the Wheeling and Lake Erie Railroad has been discontinued as the track on Steuben Street and trestle over South Main Street have been removed. The project was completed in October 2010.

== See also ==
- List of Pittsburgh neighborhoods

== Gallery ==
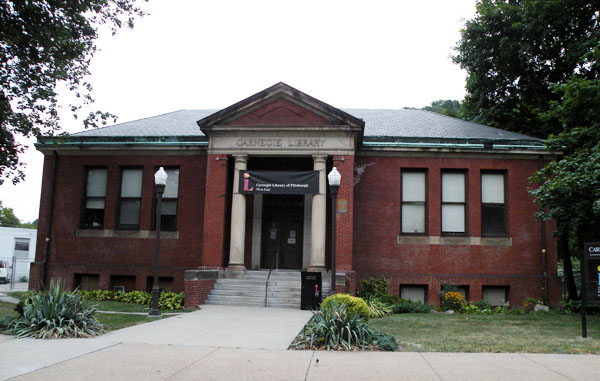
West End Branch of the Carnegie Library of Pittsburgh, built circa 1890, located at 47 Wabash Street.

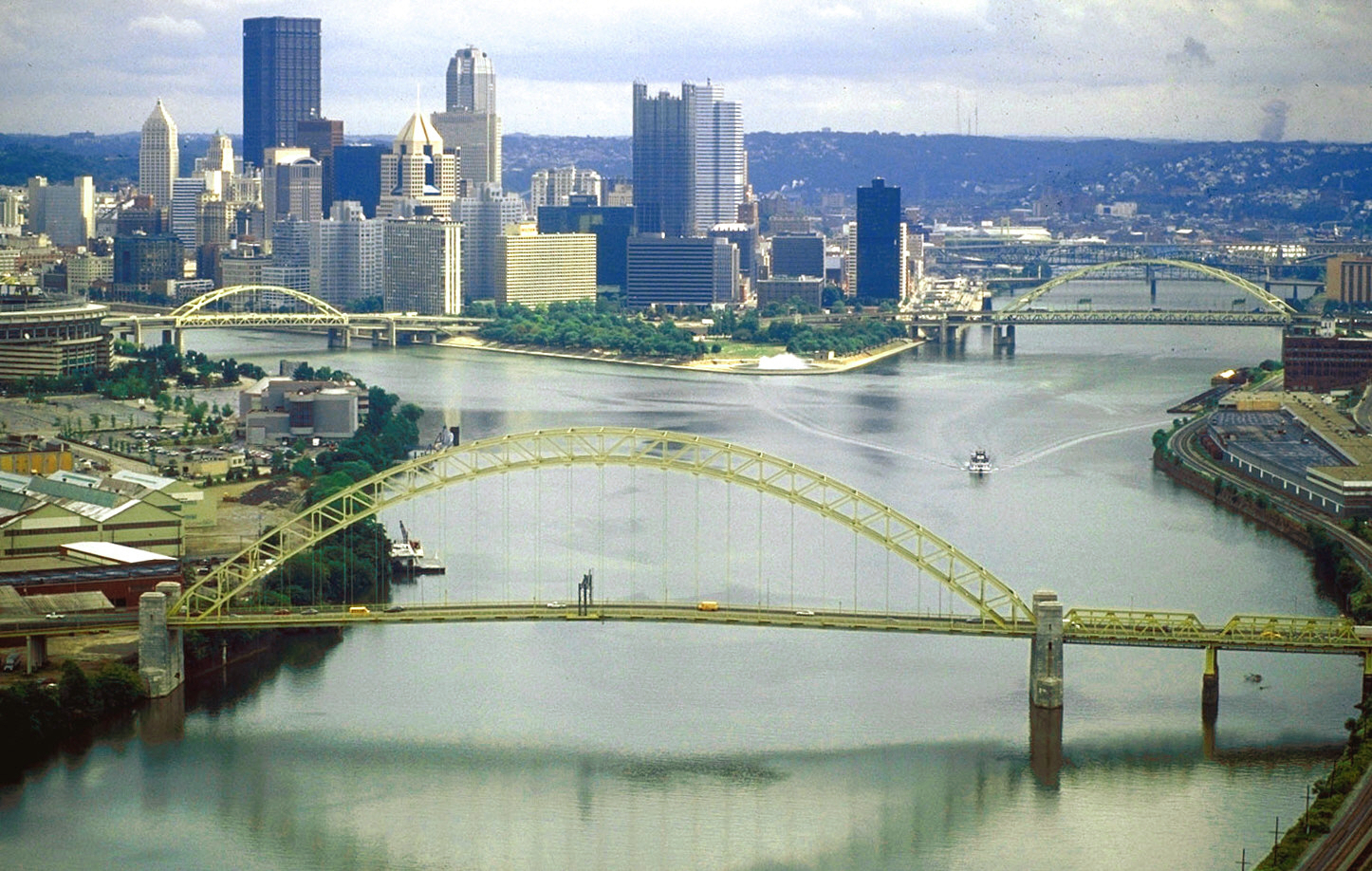
West End Bridge, built from 1930 to 1932, crosses the Ohio River and connects the West End to the Chateau neighborhood in the North Side of the city.
