= Belmar School =

- U.S. National Register of Historic Places
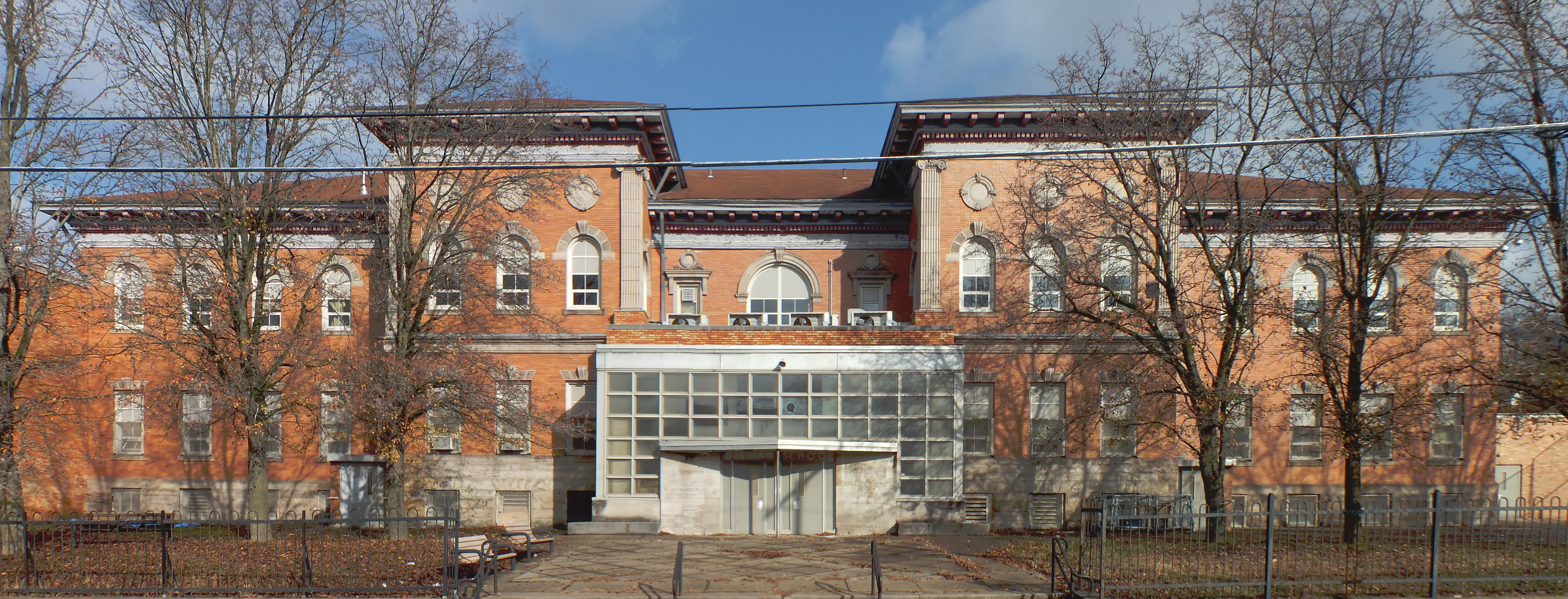
- Belmar School in 2025

- Location within Pittsburgh Location within Pennsylvania Location within the United States
- Location: 7109 Hermitage St., Pittsburgh, Pennsylvania
- Coordinates: 40°27′39″N 79°53′50″W
- Built: 1902
- MPS: Pittsburgh Public Schools TR
- NRHP reference No.: 100011513
- Added to NRHP: March 14, 2025

The Belmar School is a former public school in the Homewood neighborhood of Pittsburgh, Pennsylvania. It opened in 1902 and was listed on the National Register of Historic Places in 2025.

== History ==
The school was built by the Homewood sub-district, which served what was then Pittsburgh's 21st Ward. In 1911, all of the old ward schools were consolidated into Pittsburgh Public Schools. According to the school district's first annual report in 1912, Belmar was in excellent condition but was overcrowded with 825 students and 21 teachers:

The Belmar building... contains sixteen rooms, but accommodates only the children of the first five grades. Four rooms in this building are now on half day sessions. A full equipment for manual training, cooking and sewing is now being installed in excellent rooms in the basement of this building and this school ought to be independent with all grades.

In 2004, Belmar was one of ten schools closed by Pittsburgh Public Schools in order to cope with declining enrollment across the district. Subsequently, the building was used by the Homewood Montessori program from 2004 to 2006 and then housed middle-school students from Lincoln K–8 from 2006 to 2011. It has been vacant since 2011.

In 2022, the building was sold to a private developer with the help of an adaptive reuse loan from the Pittsburgh History and Landmarks Foundation.
