= Ridgemont (Pittsburgh) =

- Neighborhood of Pittsburgh
- Coordinates: 40.426°N 80.034°W
- Country: United States
- State: Pennsylvania
- County: Allegheny County
- City: Pittsburgh

Area
  - Total: 0.369 sq mi (0.96 km^{2})

Population (2010)
  - Total: 483
  - Density: 1,310/sq mi (505/km^{2})
- ZIP Code: 15220, 15216

Ridgemont is a neighborhood in Pittsburgh, Pennsylvania's West End. It has zip codes of both 15220 and 15216, and has representation on Pittsburgh City Council by the council member for District 2 (West Neighborhoods).

== Surrounding communities ==
Ridgemont has five borders, including the Pittsburgh neighborhoods of Westwood to the northwest, West End Valley to the north, Beechview to the northeast and Banksville to the south. The remaining border is with Green Tree to the southwest

== See also ==
- List of Pittsburgh neighborhoods
