= Colfax Elementary School =

- Colfax Elementary & Middle School
- U.S. National Register of Historic Places
- City of Pittsburgh Historic Structure
- Pittsburgh Landmark – PHLF
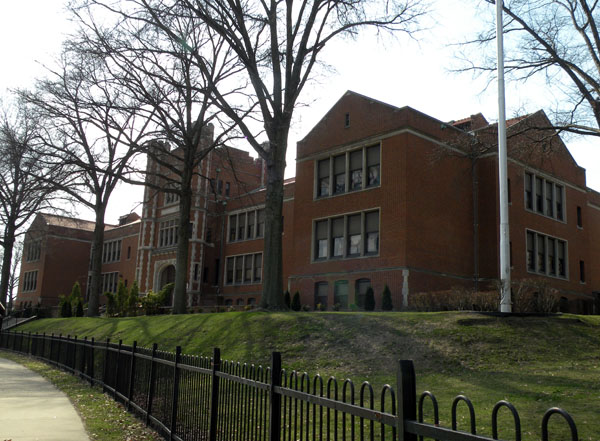

- Location within Pittsburgh Location within Pennsylvania Location within the United States
- Location: 2332 Beechwood Blvd., Pittsburgh, Pennsylvania, U.S.
- Coordinates: 40°25′59″N 79°54′56″W
- Area: 2 acres (0.81 ha)
- Built: 1911
- Architect: Edward Stotz
- Architectural style: Tudor Revival, Jacobean Revival
- Website: Colfax Elementary School
- MPS: Pittsburgh Public Schools TR
- NRHP reference No.: 86002660

Significant dates
- Added to NRHP: September 30, 1986
- Designated CPHS: November 30, 1999
- Designated PHLF: 2001

The Colfax Elementary & Middle School (also known as Pittsburgh Colfax K-8) is a public school in Pittsburgh, Pennsylvania, United States. Its building, built in 1911, was listed on the National Register of Historic Places in 1986. As of October 1, 2017, there were a total of 890 students enrolled in the school. The school's Principal is Dr. Tamara Sanders-Woods and the Vice Principal is Asia Mason and Joann Murphy (middle school). The school is one of oldest schools still open in the City of Pittsburgh. The school added a new building with a glass bridge connecting the two buildings, in 2007 circa. The school is under Pittsburgh Public Schools direction, and led by Superintendent Anthony Hamlet.

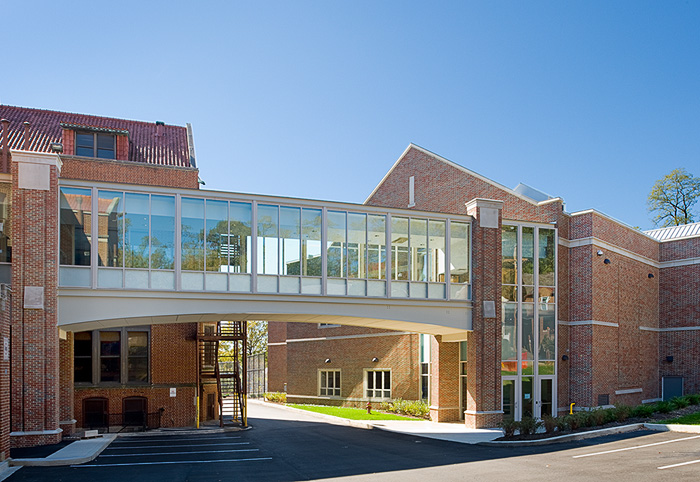
The new building was built in the early 2010s and a bridge is connected. Mostly 7th and 8th graders learn in the new building but both buildings work synonymously for all students.

== Proximity and students ==
The school presides in the Squirrel Hill neighborhood and attracts students from all over the city mostly including Squirrel Hill and East Hills (Pittsburgh). The school is made up of a lot of students from around the world including Asia, Middle East, Latin America and Africa, there is also a large Jewish population within the school. The school is prominently diverse and also includes the ESL program for non-English speaking students. Most students who attend Colfax K-8 will proceed to Taylor Allderdice to continue into high school.

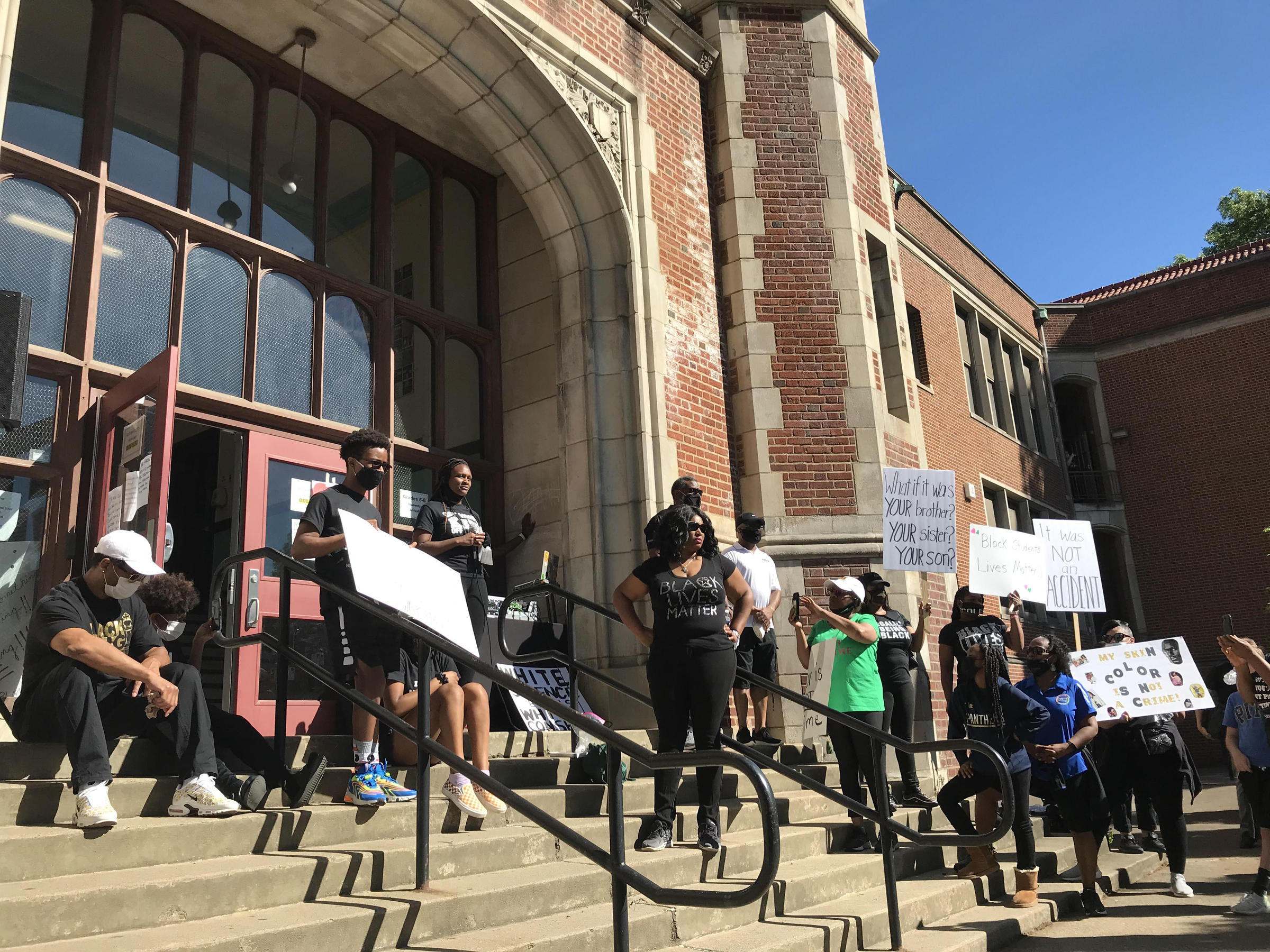
People gather in protest for racial justice amid the Black Lives Matter movement.

== Events ==
The school hosts various events including a carnival celebrations, ice skating, sports events and ballroom dancing, year round. They also raise money through different fundraisers and events including Party 4 Play and their own PTO organization. They also participate in ski club at Seven Springs Mountain Resort, running marathons, musical plays, movie nights, talent shows, VIP Day (involves bringing a parent or close one to school, to see how students are in class) and a variety of other things. The school has won a lot of consecutive awards for the "African American Bowl Challenge", and tons of champion awards in reading and literature.
