= Thaddeus Stevens Elementary School (Pittsburgh) =

Elementary school in Pittsburgh, Pennsylvania, U.S.

Stevens Elementary School
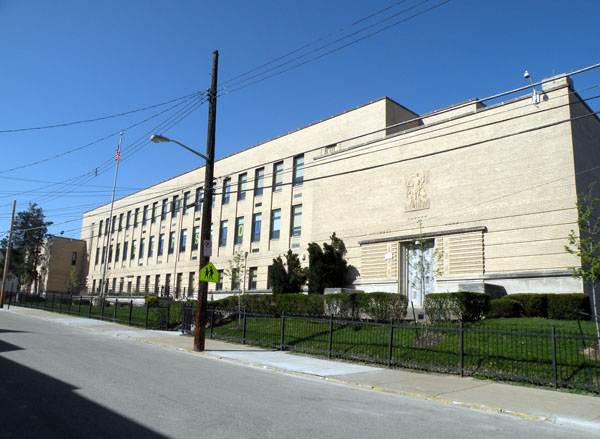

- Location within Pittsburgh
- 40°26′32.88″N 80°2′24.37″W
- Location: 824 Crucible Street (Elliott), Pittsburgh, Pennsylvania, USA

History
- Built: 1940

Thaddeus Stevens Elementary School (also known as Thaddeus Stevens School, and Pittsburgh Stevens K-8) is a former elementary school located at 824 Crucible Street in the Elliott neighborhood of Pittsburgh, Pennsylvania.

It was added to the List of Pittsburgh History and Landmarks Foundation Historic Landmarks in 2001, and the List of City of Pittsburgh historic designations on November 30, 1999.

== History and architectural features ==
Built in 1939, this historic school was a part of the Pittsburgh Public Schools and served the Elliott, Esplen, Sheraden, West End, and Westgate Village neighborhoods.

The school was designed by Marion M. Steen (1886–1966) in the Art Deco style and was named in honor of Republican abolitionist Thaddeus Stevens, who was a U.S. Congressman from Pennsylvania.

It was added to the List of Pittsburgh History and Landmarks Foundation Historic Landmarks in 2001, and the List of City of Pittsburgh historic designations on November 30, 1999.

Stevens was closed in after its final group of students finished their studies in 2012.
