= John Frew House =

Historic house in Pennsylvania, United States

- U.S. National Register of Historic Places
- Pittsburgh Landmark – PHLF
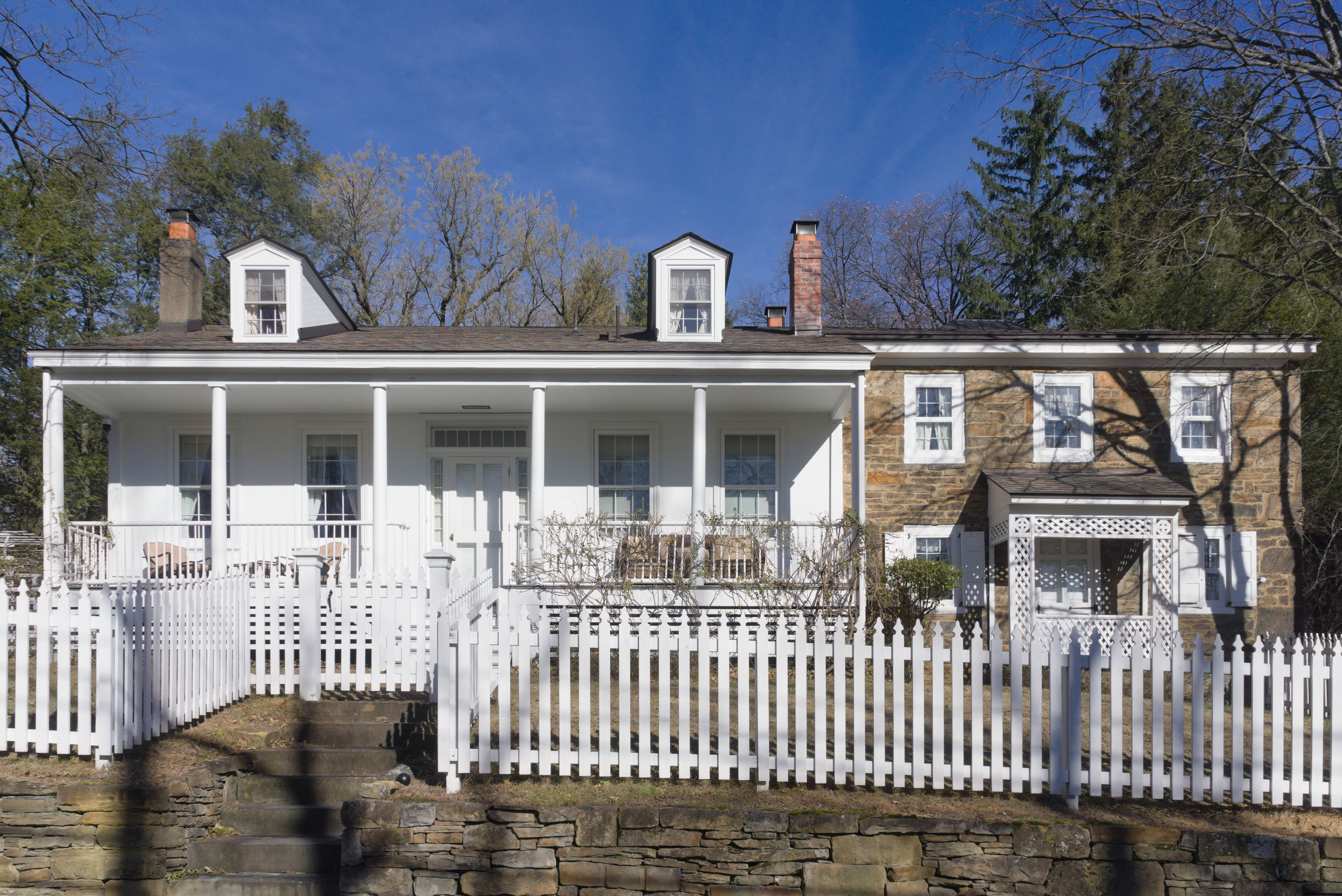
- The house in 2024

- Location within Pittsburgh Location within Pennsylvania Location within the United States
- Location: 1566 Poplar Street, Pittsburgh, Pennsylvania
- Coordinates: 40°25′45.52″N 80°3′31.03″W
- Built: Between 1790 and 1840
- Architectural style: Colonial Revival, Greek Revival
- NRHP reference No.: 01000593

Significant dates
- Added to NRHP: May 30, 2001
- Designated PHLF: 1984

The John Frew House, also or formerly known as the Rachel and Robert Sterrett House, is an historic house in the Westwood neighborhood of Pittsburgh, Pennsylvania.

== History ==
Of the five extant pre-1800 structures remaining in the City of Pittsburgh, the John Frew House is the only one that is currently being used as an occupied house. Its location on Poplar Street places it on the City of Pittsburgh side of the border between Crafton and Pittsburgh.

The original stone section of the house and the adjacent stone springhouse were built circa 1790. The Greek Revival addition to the house was built circa 1840. A garage was then added to the springhouse circa 1950.

Preservation of the home began in the 1930s.

It was subsequently listed on the National Register of Historic Places in 2001. The house also has a landmark plaque from the Pittsburgh History and Landmarks Foundation, and it was added to the List of Pittsburgh History and Landmarks Foundation Historic Landmarks in 1984.
