= Old Stone Tavern (Pittsburgh) =

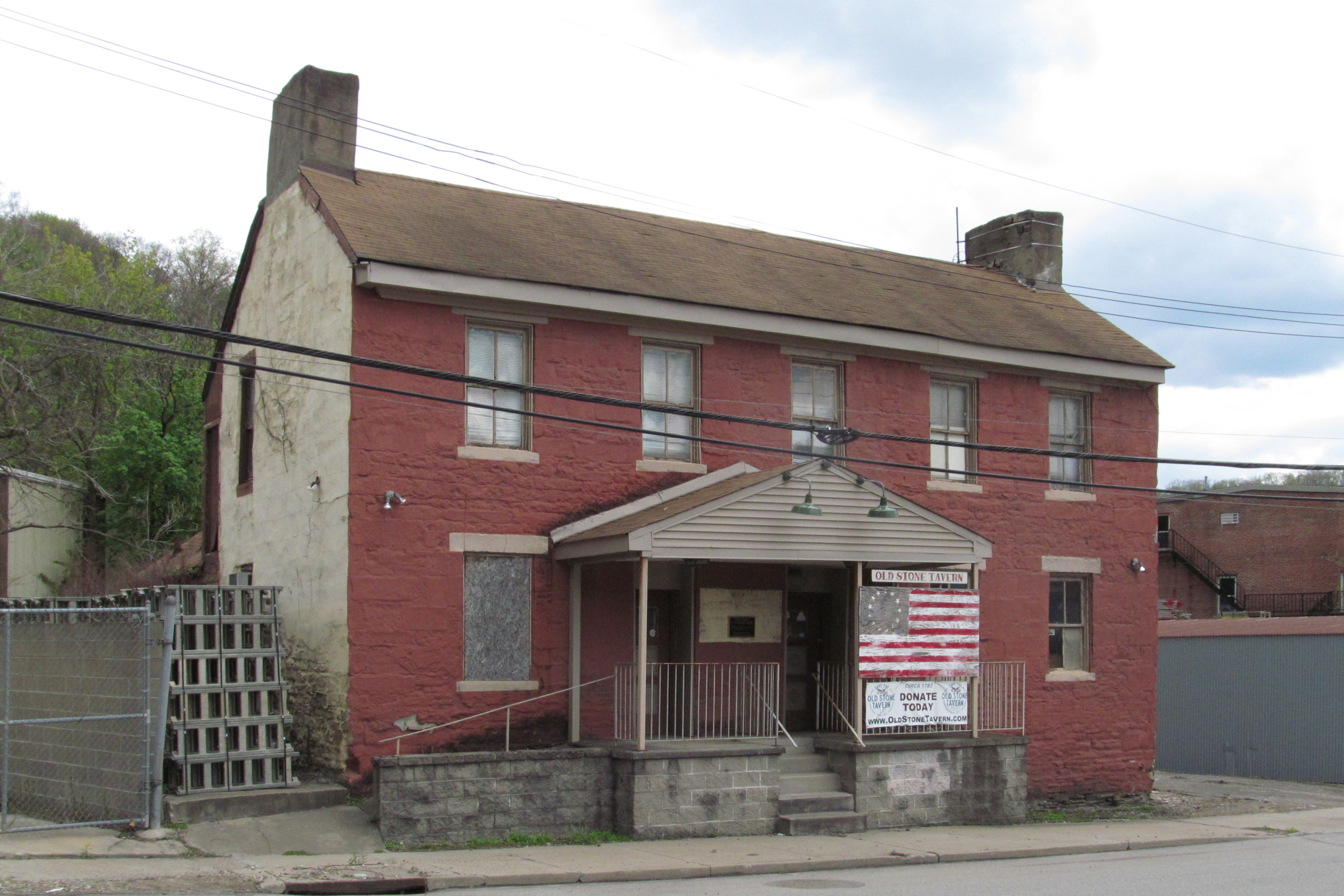

- Location within Pittsburgh
- 40.435039°N 80.034167°W
- Location: 434 Greentree Road (West End), Pittsburgh, Pennsylvania, USA

History
- Built: circa 1782

The Old Stone Tavern (also called Elliott's, Coates Tavern, and the Old Stone Inn) is a historic building located at 434 Greentree Road, in the West End Village neighborhood of Pittsburgh, Pennsylvania. The tavern dates back to at least 1782, and more likely 1777. The tavern is the oldest commercial building in Pittsburgh.

== History ==
A datestone of 1752 is on the building. However, local architectural historians have argued it was built circa 1782, shortly after the American Revolution, by Daniel Elliott, who served in the war under Alexander Lowery.

An account ledger from the tavern exists at the Main branch of the Carnegie Library of Pittsburgh. The ledger is lettered "P" and its dated from 1793 to 1797.

The tavern was continuously operated as a restaurant or bar (except during Prohibition when it was a "confectionery store" with a speakeasy being operated out of the basement) until 2009.

The tavern is located at a bend in what was the historic Washington and Pittsburgh Turnpike, (a toll road connecting Pittsburgh to Washington County and the National Road (Route 40)) following the Native American path known as Catfish Trail (part of the Mingo Trails). It is believed to have served as a toll house and frontier trading post and likely played a role in the Whiskey Rebellion, the late 18th century uprising against a federal excise tax on liquor, that ended with the implementation of martial law. "John Woods was in the tavern and used the owners' ferry the night before the raid on John Neville's estate" (July 16, 1794). Moreover, the ledger contains over 89 names connected with the Whiskey Rebellion as well as 109 veterans of the American Revolution and 16 men who would serve in the War of 1812.

The Old Stone Tavern was added to the List of City of Pittsburgh historic designations on October 6, 2009.

Pittsburgh's Old Stone Tavern Friends Trust incorporated in December 2013 with the mission statement "To secure Pittsburgh's Old Stone Tavern and its property, provide for its long term preservation, and educate the public regarding its significance in United States History".
