= Chateau (Pittsburgh) =

- Neighborhood of Pittsburgh
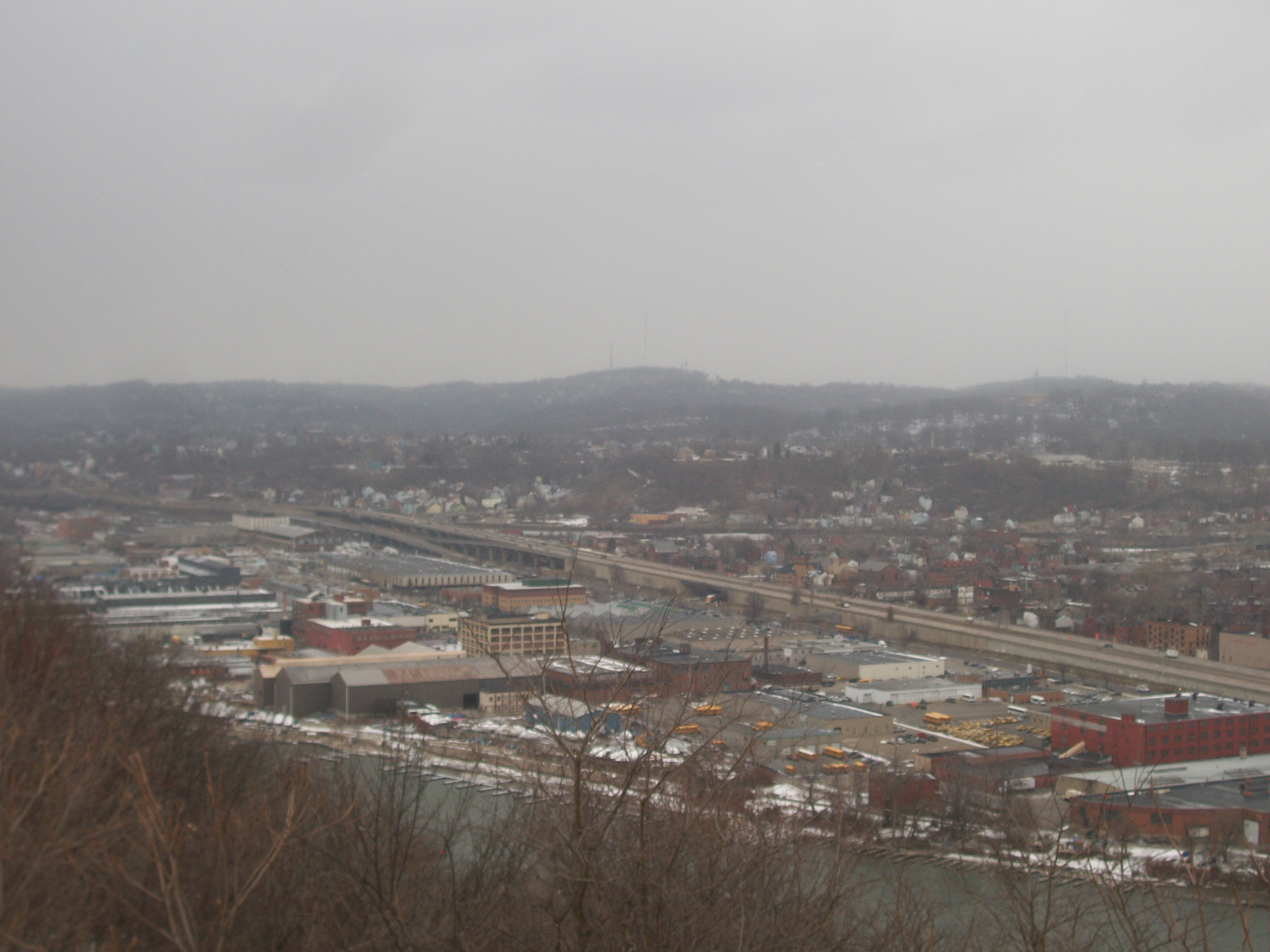
- Chateau is the swathe of large warehouses and other industrial facilities between the Ohio River and PA Route 65.

- Coordinates: 40.4493°N 80.0283°W
- Country: United States
- State: Pennsylvania
- County: Allegheny County
- City: Pittsburgh

Area
  - Total: 0.383 sq mi (0.99 km^{2})

Population (2020)
  - Total: 19
  - Density: 50/sq mi (19/km^{2})

Chateau is a North Side neighborhood in Downtown Pittsburgh, Pennsylvania. It has representation on Pittsburgh City Council by the council member for District 6 (North Shore/Downtown Neighborhoods). It is on the banks of the Ohio River and is separated from the neighborhood of Manchester by PA Route 65.

As of the 2000 U.S. census, Chateau has a population of 39. A 2006 investigation by the Pittsburgh Post-Gazette found the neighborhood virtually uninhabited. This may be because the neighborhood mostly consists of warehouses and places of business along the Ohio River.

In August 2009, the Rivers Casino opened along the Ohio River in the Chateau neighborhood. Kamin Science Center and the Manchester Craftsmen's Guild are also located in Chateau. Chateau has a Zip Code of 15233.

== Surrounding and adjacent Pittsburgh neighborhoods ==
Chateau has four land borders with the Pittsburgh neighborhoods of Manchester to the north and north-northeast, Allegheny West to the northeast, North Shore to the east, and Marshall-Shadeland to the northwest. Across the Ohio River, Chateau runs adjacent with the Pittsburgh neighborhoods of (from northwest to southeast) Esplen, Elliott, West End Valley (with direct link via West End Bridge) and the South Shore

== See also ==
- List of Pittsburgh neighborhoods

== Gallery ==
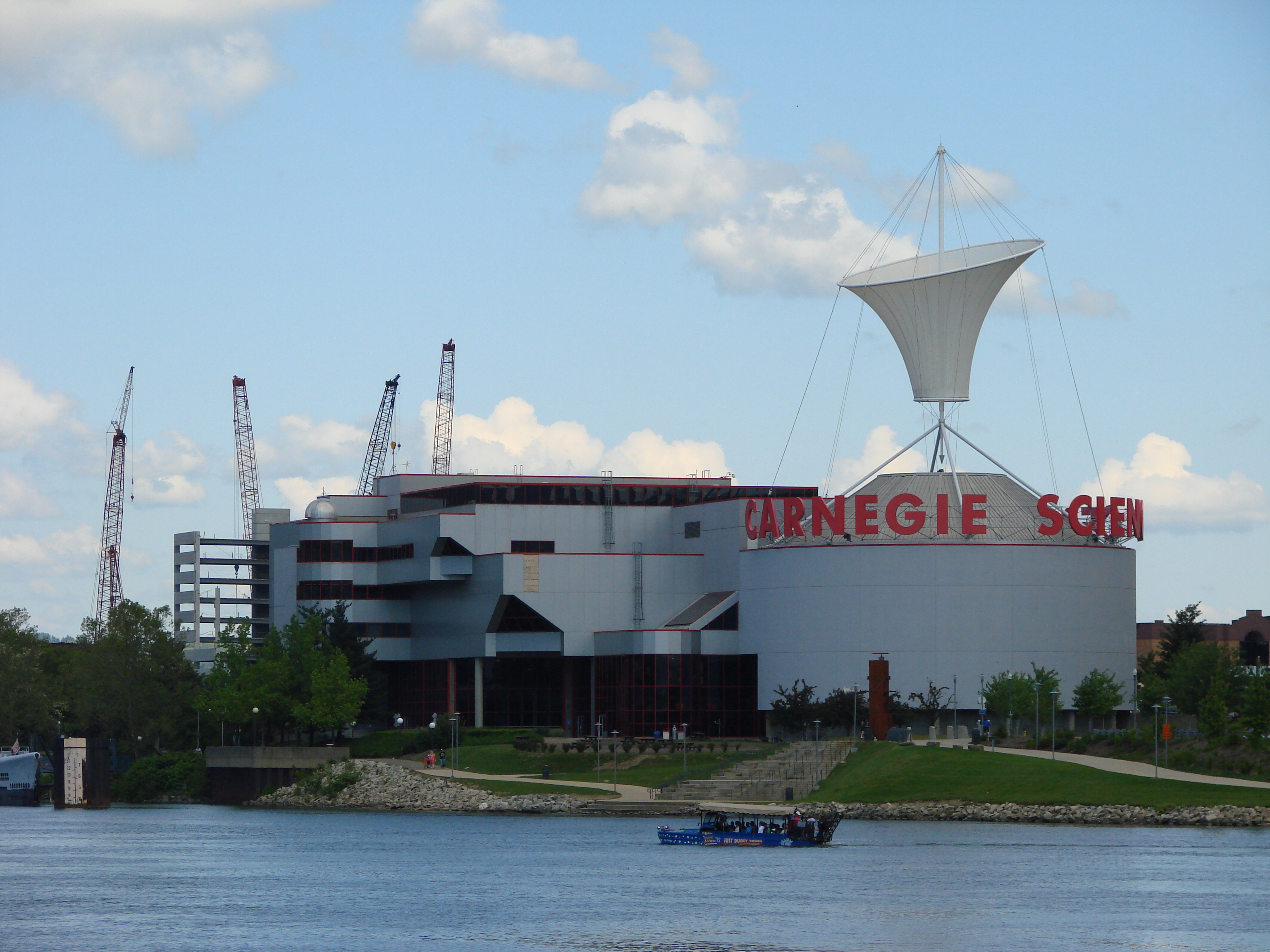
Kamin Science Center, opened in 1991, at 1 Allegheny Avenue in the Chateau neighborhood of Pittsburgh.

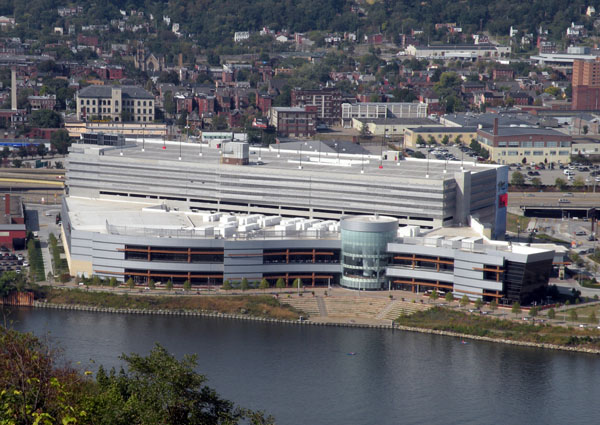
Rivers Casino, opened in 2009, at 777 Casino Drive.

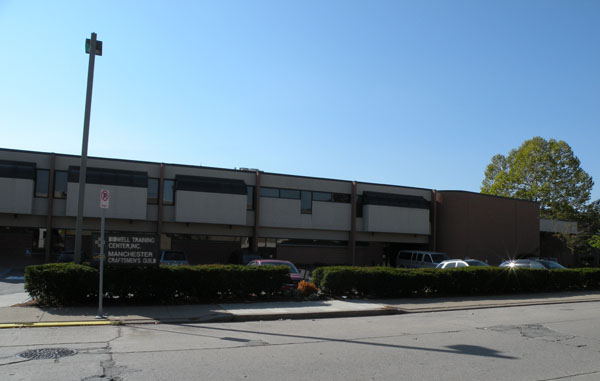
Manchester Craftsmen's Guild, founded in 1968, at 1815 Metropolitan Street.

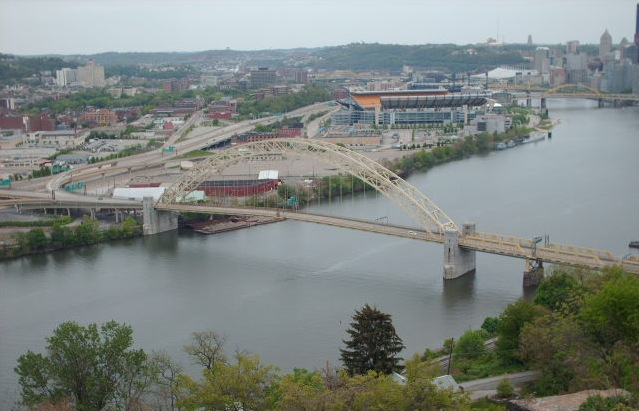
West End Bridge, built from 1930 to 1932, crosses the Ohio River and connects Pittsburgh's West End to the Chateau neighborhood in the city's North Side.
