= Gladstone School (Pittsburgh) =

- U.S. National Register of Historic Places
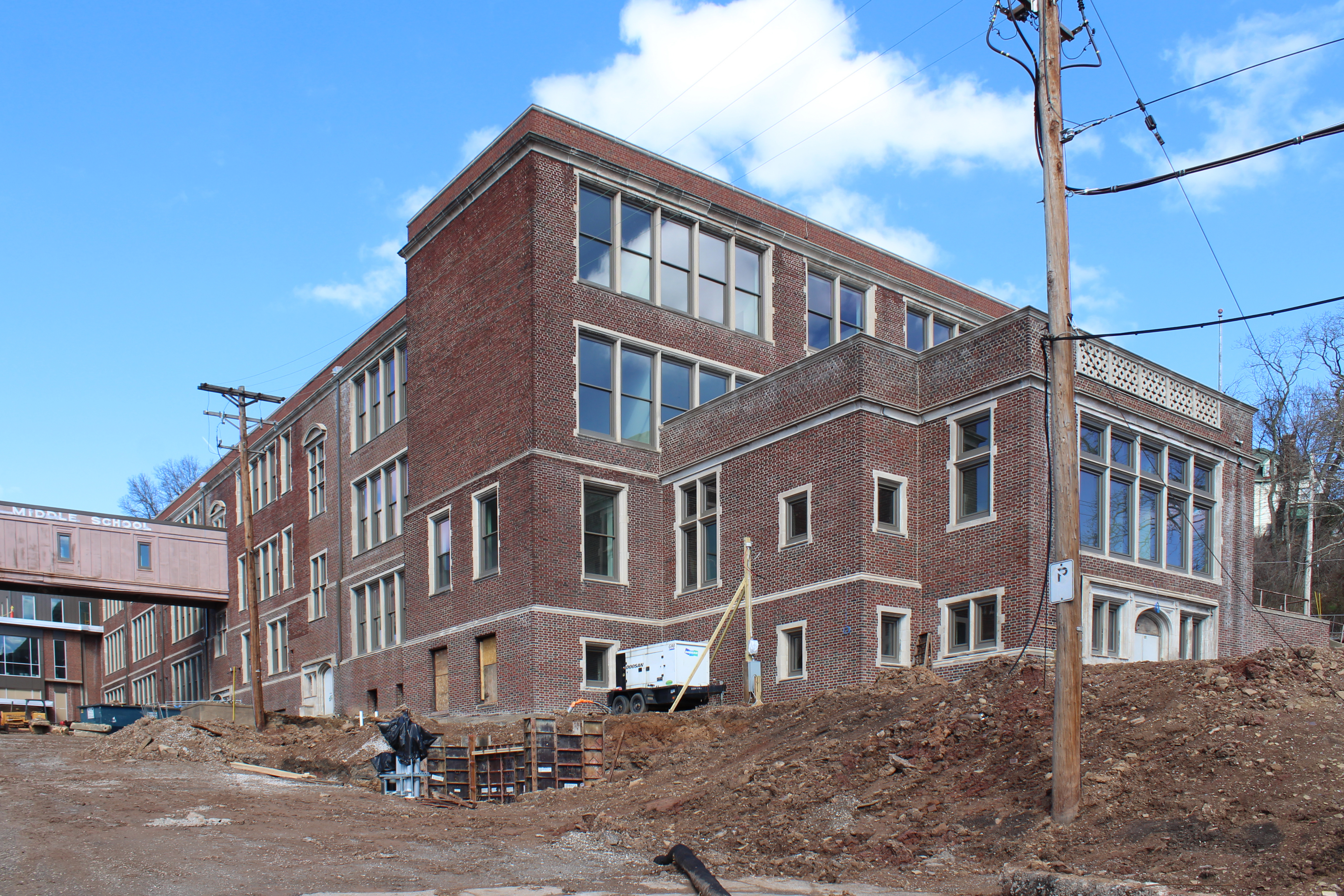
- Main building in 2024

- Location within Pittsburgh Location within Pennsylvania Location within the United States
- Location: 327 Hazelwood Ave., Pittsburgh, Pennsylvania
- Coordinates: 40°24′44″N 79°56′27″W
- Built: 1914, 1923, 1926
- Architect: O. M. Topp
- Architectural style: Collegiate Gothic
- NRHP reference No.: 100006988
- Added to NRHP: September 17, 2021

Gladstone School is a historic public school in the Hazelwood neighborhood of Pittsburgh, Pennsylvania. It operated between 1914 and 2001, serving at various times as an elementary school, a junior high or middle school, and a high school. The school's mascot was the Gladiators. Pittsburgh Public Schools sold the vacant property to a community group in 2016. It was listed on the National Register of Historic Places in 2021.

The school consists of two buildings, both in the Collegiate Gothic style. The main building was designed by O. M. Topp and was built in two phases, which were completed in 1914 and 1923, respectively. The annex building was added in 1926 along with a pedestrian bridge to join the two buildings.

== History ==
The school opened in October 1914 with a capacity of 350 elementary-grade students. An addition in 1923 increased the number of classrooms from 14 to 26 and allowed the school to also enroll junior-high students. In 1926, a three-story annex opened next to the original building, bringing the school's capacity to 1,290 students. The annex included a swimming pool, two gymnasiums, wood, metal, and electric shops, and facilities for art, music, drafting, and millinery.

By the 1950s, Hazelwood's demographics had shifted from primarily Eastern European to primarily African American. To accommodate the age and population changes in the neighborhood, Gladstone was expanded to a senior high school in 1960. The school was scheduled to close in 1976 as part of a Pittsburgh Board of Education plan to reduce segregation in the district. After pressure from neighborhood residents, it ultimately remained open as a middle school, but the elementary and high school grades were eliminated. The high school students were bused to the new, majority-white Brashear High School in Beechview.

Gladstone closed in 2001 and remained vacant for over 20 years. In 2016, Pittsburgh Public Schools sold the property to a community group which planned to use it as a community center and affordable housing. Ground was broken in 2022 to convert the main building into 51 mixed-income housing units.

== Architecture ==
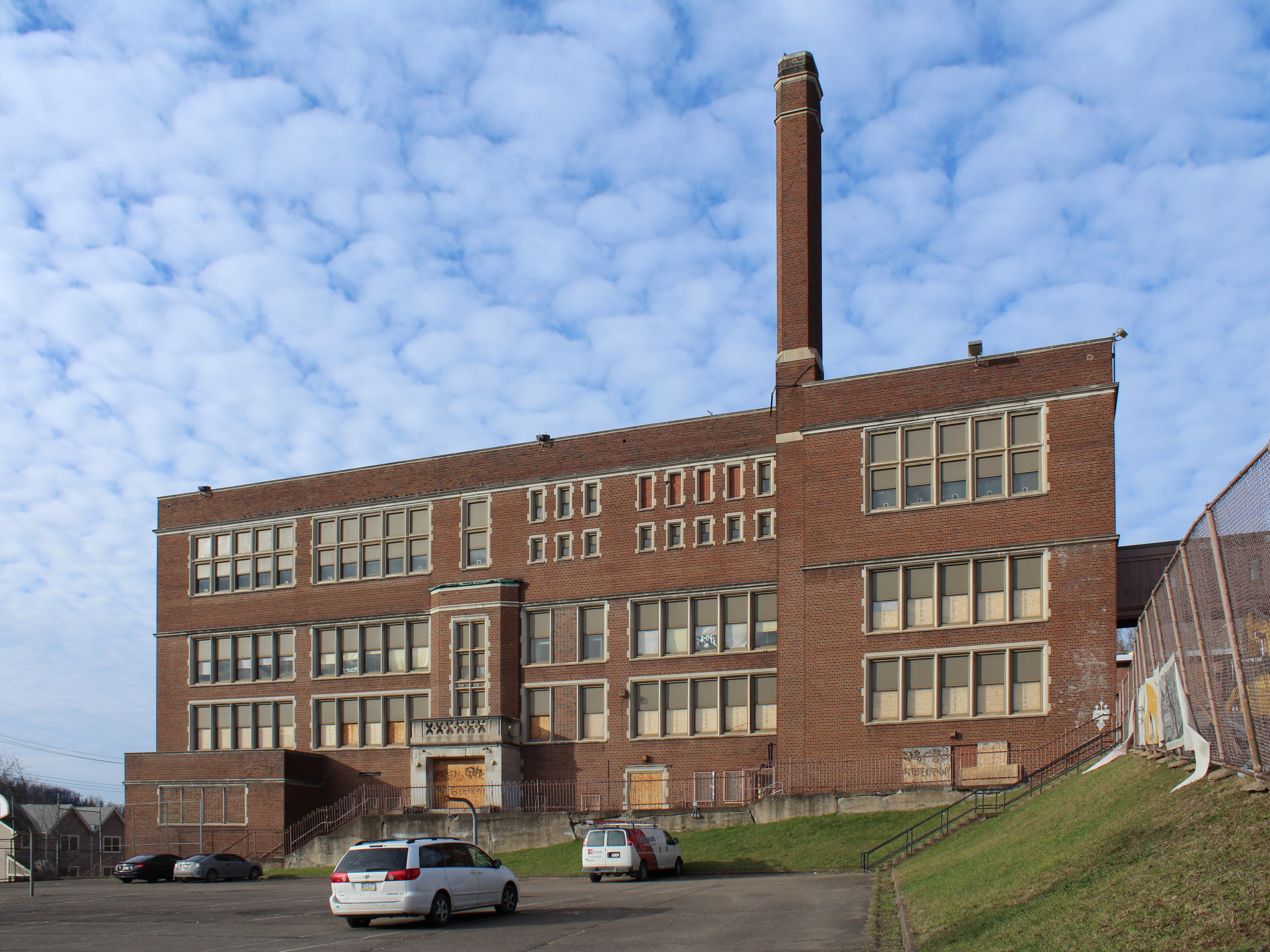
Annex building (1926)

Gladstone School consists of two rectangular buildings which are oriented perpendicular to each other and joined by a pedestrian bridge. The main school building, on the east side, was designed by local architect O. M. Topp and was built in two phases. The front section was completed in 1914 and the rear section was added in 1923. A further addition at the rear was completed in 1965. The annex building on the west side was completed in 1926. Both buildings are three stories high with raised basements and are designed in the Collegiate Gothic style.
