= West End Overlook =

Scenic overlook in Pittsburgh, Pennsylvania, United States

Coordinates: 40.44602°N 80.03405°W

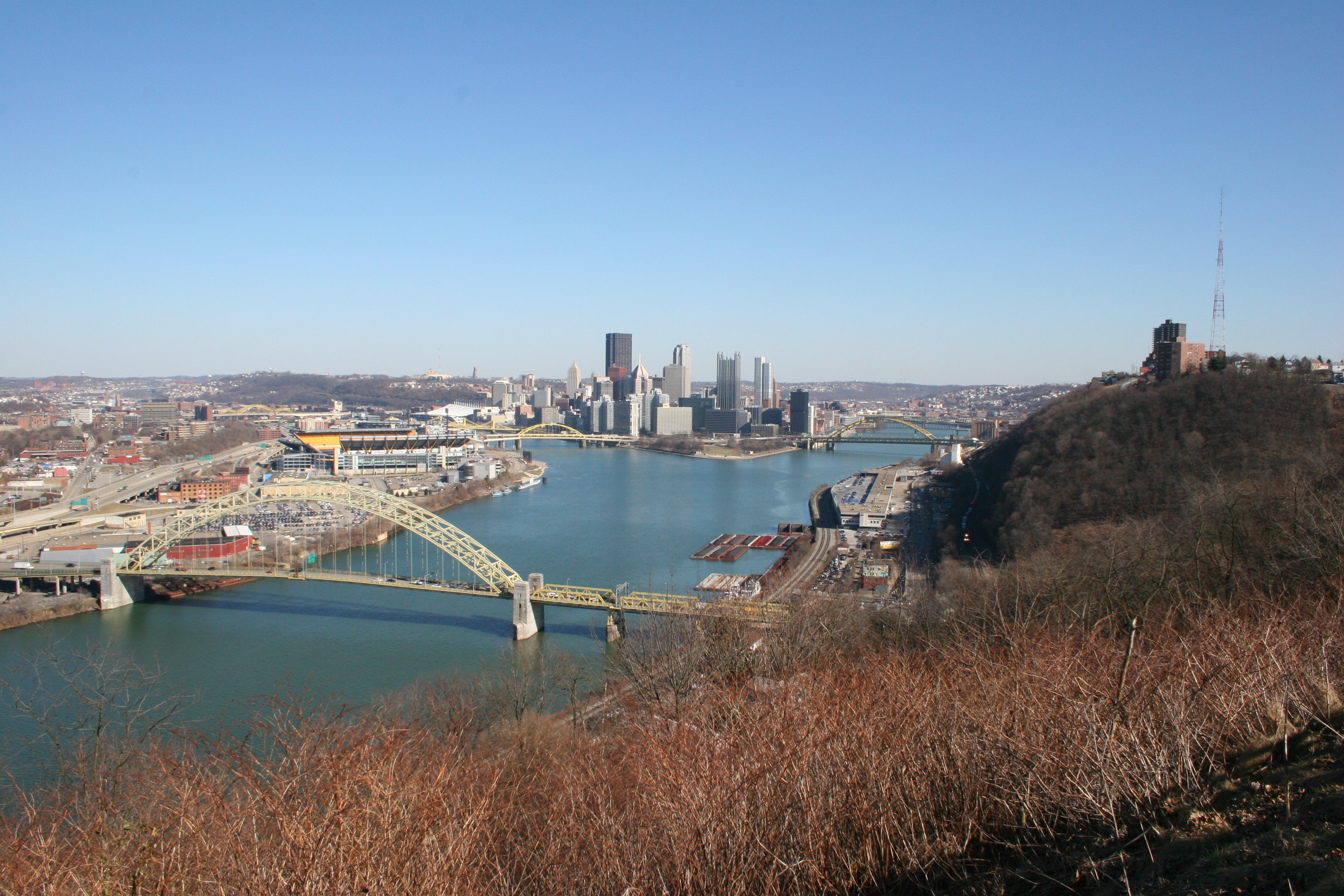
Daytime view from the West End Overlook, with the West End Bridge in the foreground and the downtown skyline in the background

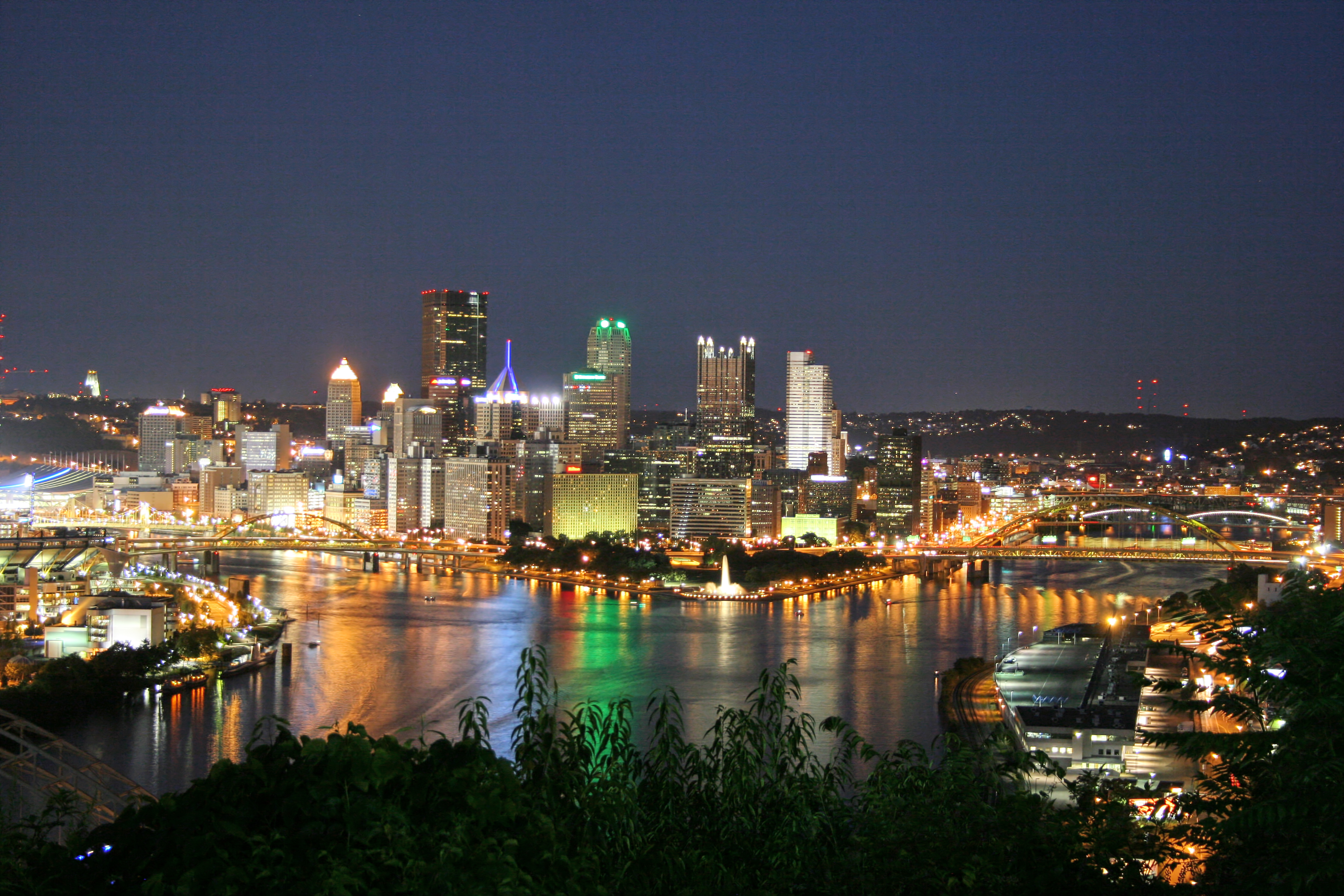
Night view from the West End Overlook

The West End-Elliott Overlook Park, often shortened to West End Overlook, is a small municipal park and scenic viewpoint in the Elliott neighborhood of Pittsburgh, Pennsylvania.

In 2003 the park was redesigned with landscaped gardens and a walkway under shade trees. Terraced stone banks provide seats for tourists. The park affords a sweeping view of the valleys of the Allegheny, Monongahela, and Ohio Rivers as well as Downtown Pittsburgh.
