= Westwood (Pittsburgh) =

- Neighborhood of Pittsburgh
- Coordinates: 40.434°N 80.049°W
- Country: United States
- State: Pennsylvania
- County: Allegheny County
- City: Pittsburgh

Area
  - Total: 0.692 sq mi (1.79 km^{2})

Population (2020)
  - Total: 3,722
  - Density: 5,380/sq mi (2,080/km^{2})

Westwood is an American neighborhood that is located in the West End Region of Pittsburgh, Pennsylvania.

== History and notable features ==
Beginning as a part of the now-defunct Township of Chartiers and existing for a short time as an independent borough, Westwood was annexed by the city of Pittsburgh in three pieces: the eastern third in 1872, and the remaining sectors progressing west in 1921 and 1927.

Westwood is a quiet, residential community that is inhabited by a diverse resident population. Its buildings include an eclectic mix of architectural styles that span multiple architectural design eras. Among these is the John Frew House, one of the oldest surviving structures west of the Allegheny Mountains, which dates (in its original form) to 1790.

Westwood also has a public primary school that bears the community's name, as well as a public swimming pool, a playground, and ballfields.

Its residences and businesses are divided into two U.S. Post Office zip codes: 15205 (western half) and 15220 (eastern half). Its residents are represented on the Pittsburgh City Council by council member (Theresa Kail-Smith) for District 2 (West Neighborhoods).

The neighborhood's main thoroughfare is Noblestown Road (which splits it in two), and Noble Manor is its major commercial district. The Pittsburgh Bureau of Fire houses the 29 Engine company in Westwood.

== Surrounding communities ==
Westwood has seven borders, five of which are located within the Pittsburgh neighborhoods of Crafton Heights to the north, Elliott to the northeast, Ridgemont and West End Valley to the east, and Oakwood to the south.

The other two borders are located in the boroughs of Green Tree to the south and Crafton to the southwest.

== See also ==
- List of Pittsburgh neighborhoods
