= Baxter High School =

- U.S. National Register of Historic Places
- Pittsburgh Landmark – PHLF

- Location within Pennsylvania
- Location: 925 Brushton Ave., Pittsburgh, Pennsylvania
- Coordinates: 40°27′22″N 79°53′19″W
- Area: 1 acre (0.40 ha)
- Built: 1908
- Architect: Kiehnel, Elliott & Chalfont
- Architectural style: Chicago
- MPS: Pittsburgh Public Schools TR
- NRHP reference No.: 86002647

Significant dates
- Added to NRHP: September 30, 1986
- Designated PHLF: 2002

Baxter High School (now the Pittsburgh Student Achievement Center) is a historic high school building in the Homewood North neighborhood of Pittsburgh, Pennsylvania. Built in 1908, is now home to an alternative school for grades 6-12. It was listed on the National Register of Historic Places in 1986.
