= Elliott (Pittsburgh) =

- Neighborhood
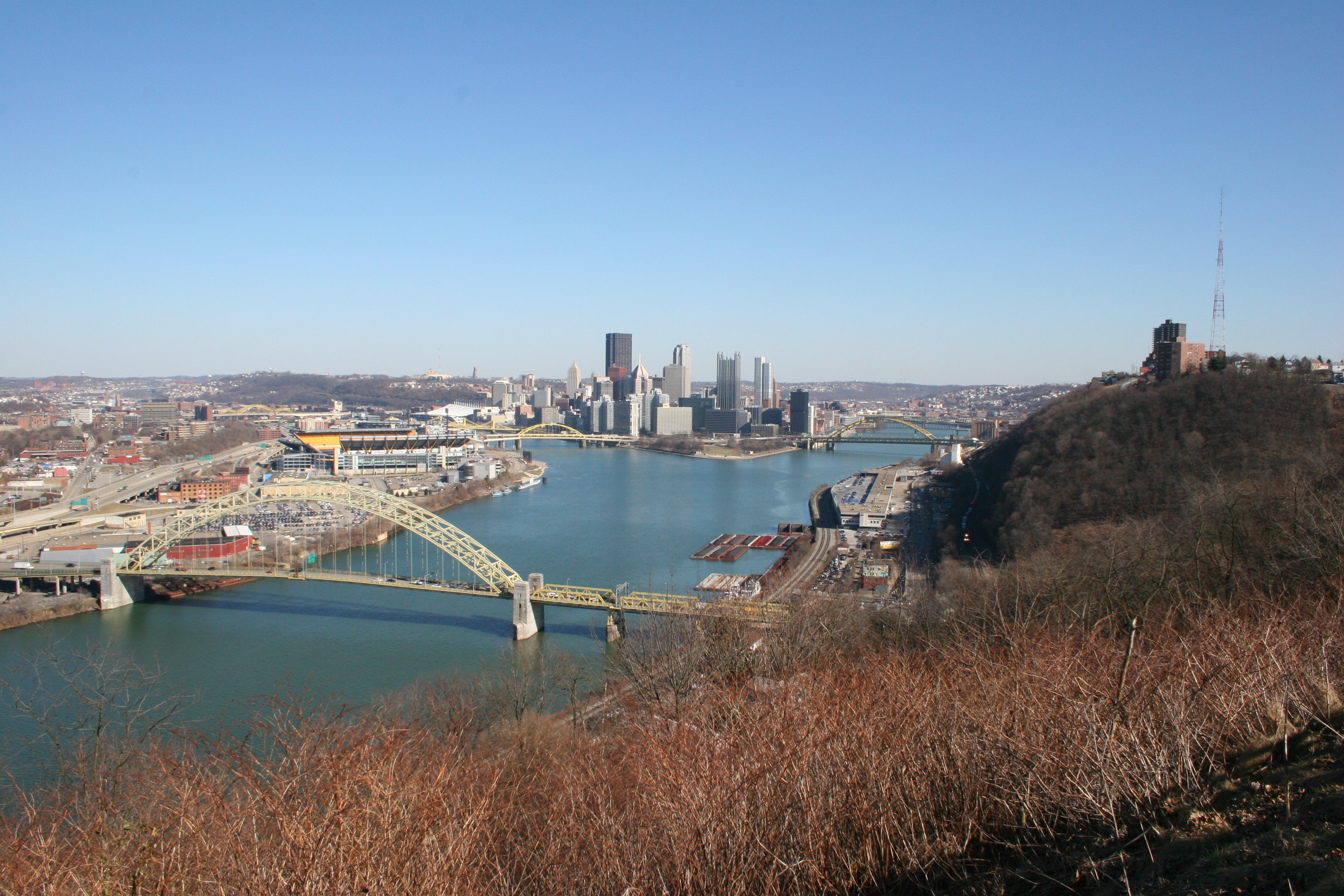
- Daytime view from the West End Overlook, with the West End Bridge in the foreground and the downtown skyline in the background

- Coordinates: 40.446°N 80.038°W
- Country: United States
- State: Pennsylvania
- County: Allegheny County
- City: Pittsburgh

Area
  - Total: 0.606 sq mi (1.57 km^{2})

Population (2020)
  - Total: 2,193
  - Density: 3,620/sq mi (1,400/km^{2})
- ZIP code: 15220

Elliott is a small, hilly neighborhood in Pittsburgh, Pennsylvania, United States' West End Region. Elliott is represented on the Pittsburgh City Council by the council member for District 2 (West Neighborhoods), and uses the ZIP code 15220.

== History ==
Beginning as a portion of the now-defunct Township of Chartiers and existing for a brief time as an independent borough, Elliott was annexed by the City of Pittsburgh in two pieces, the southern half in 1906 and the northern half in 1921. Elliott grew quickly during this time as a dense and thriving residential community, due to its proximity to downtown Pittsburgh and direct access to several arterial roads and streetcar lines. In the latter half of the twentieth century, however, the neighborhood was affected adversely by industrial decline, economic hardship, and mass emigration to Pittsburgh's then developing suburbs, as well as numerous other socioeconomic factors that affected the region at that time. Today, the West End Elliott Citizens Council is an active community group located in the heart of the neighborhood and is working to help reverse this deterioration.

The Pittsburgh Bureau of Fire houses Engine 30 and Truck 30 in Elliott.

== Attractions ==
Elliott is home to West End Park which was voted one of Pittsburgh's best-planned community parks. Elliott also contains one of Pittsburgh's most visited attractions, the West End Overlook, which recently underwent a two-year, $2.1 million renovation. Elliott is also home to numerous churches, historic homes, and a newly built senior retirement facility. Its former community public school, Thaddeus Stevens Elementary, closed in 2012 after 73 years of operation.

== City steps ==
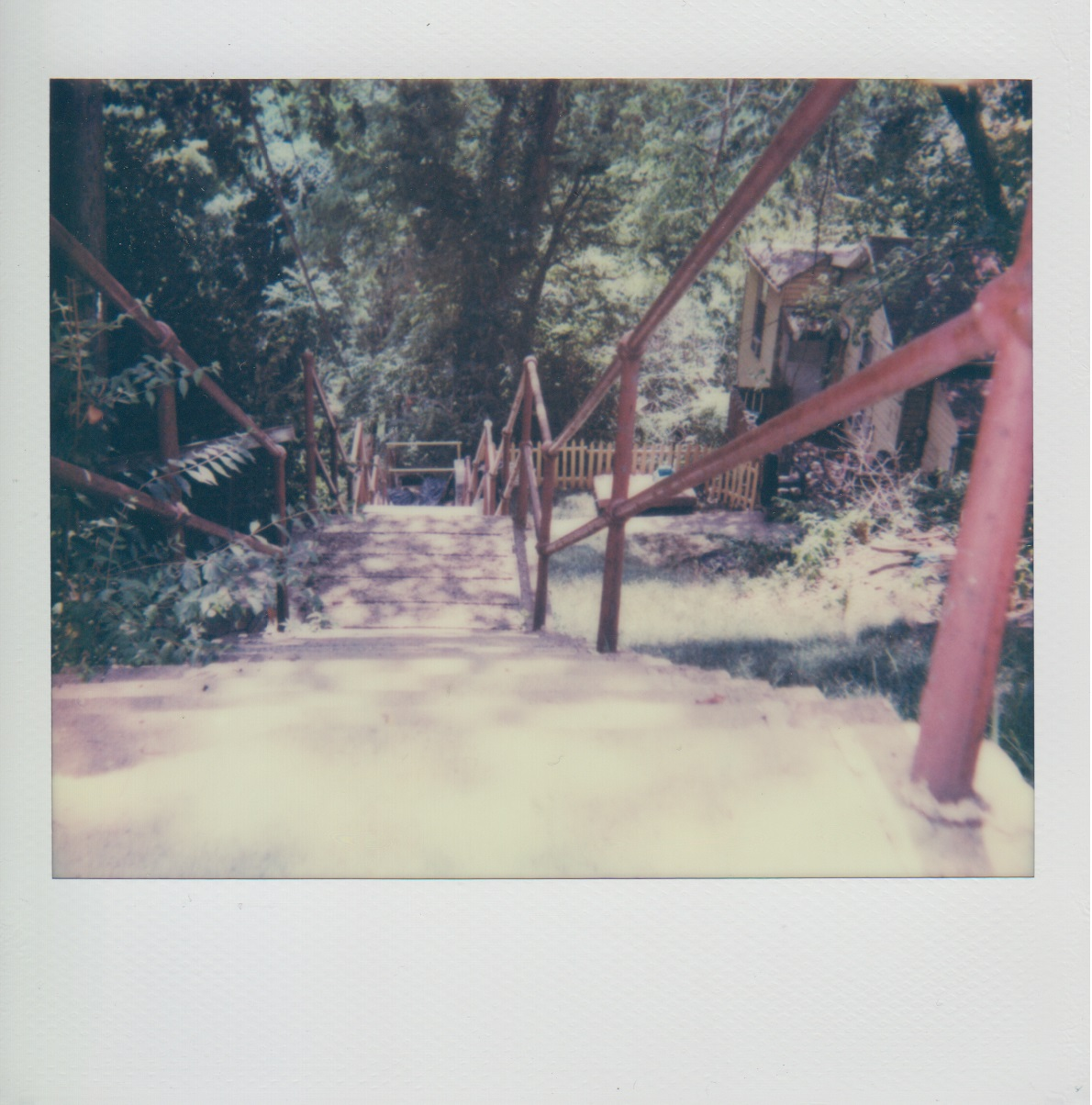
The Valonia Street city steps in Elliott

The Elliott neighborhood has 20 distinct flights of city steps, many of which are open and in a safe condition. In Elliott, the public stairways in Pittsburgh connect pedestrians to public transportation and provide an easy way to travel throughout the hilly streets.

== Trivia ==
- A notable street in Elliott is called "Rue Grande Vue." It is the address of a group of homes known locally as the "Ten Commandments," that have an impressive view of the skyline of Pittsburgh similar to the West End Overlook. One of the homes has been demolished, so there are only 9 now.
- According to some older residents of Elliott, the neighborhood was once nicknamed "dogtown" because many of the locals owned dogs as pets.

== Surrounding Pittsburgh neighborhoods ==
Elliott has five borders with the following Pittsburgh neighborhoods:

- North – Esplen (a Pittsburgh neighborhood)
- East – West End Valley (a Pittsburgh neighborhood)
- South – Westwood (a Pittsburgh neighborhood)
- West – Crafton Heights (a Pittsburgh neighborhood)
- North west – Sheraden (a Pittsburgh neighborhood)

Elliott is also adjacent to the Pittsburgh neighborhood of Chateau across the Ohio River.

== See also ==
- List of Pittsburgh neighborhoods
