= East Carnegie =

- Neighborhood of Pittsburgh
- Coordinates: 40.420°N 80.071°W
- Country: United States
- State: Pennsylvania
- County: Allegheny County
- City: Pittsburgh

Area
  - Total: 0.432 sq mi (1.12 km^{2})

Population (2020)
  - Total: 491
  - Density: 1,140/sq mi (439/km^{2})

East Carnegie is a neighborhood located in the West End of Pittsburgh, Pennsylvania, United States, adjacent to the neighborhood of Oakwood. It is a "natural area" with large tracts of wooded land.

Most of East Carnegie uses a post office zip code of 15106, while a small part of this neighborhood uses a zip code of 15205. Residents have representation on Pittsburgh City Council by the council member for District 2 (West Neighborhoods).

== Surrounding neighborhoods ==
East Carnegie has four borders, including the Pittsburgh neighborhood of Oakwood to the northeast, Crafton to the north, Scott Township to the west and southwest, and Green Tree to the east and southeast.

== See also ==
- List of Pittsburgh neighborhoods
