= Oakwood (Pittsburgh) =

- Neighborhood of Pittsburgh
- Coordinates: 40.426°N 80.067°W
- Country: United States
- State: Pennsylvania
- County: Allegheny County
- City: Pittsburgh

Area
  - Total: 0.252 sq mi (0.65 km^{2})

Population (2010)
  - Total: 1,027
  - Density: 4,080/sq mi (1,570/km^{2})

Oakwood is a neighborhood in the West End of Pittsburgh, Pennsylvania, United States. It has a zip code of 15205, and has representation on Pittsburgh City Council by the council member for District 2 (West Neighborhoods).

== Demographics ==
As of the census of 2000, there were 1,028 people, 523 households, and 251 families residing in Oakwood. Of the 1,028 people residing in Oakwood, 448 were male and 580 were female. 255 of the housing units were owner-occupied and 268 were renter-occupied. There were 102 households with persons age 18 and younger and 215 households with persons age 65 and older.

== Oakwood Park ==
Oakwood park is home to a magnificent old stone reservoir and the school bell of the elementary school which formerly stood at this site. Older people at the park talk about swimming in the reservoir in defiance of the local police when they were children. The school was closed in 1971.

== City steps ==
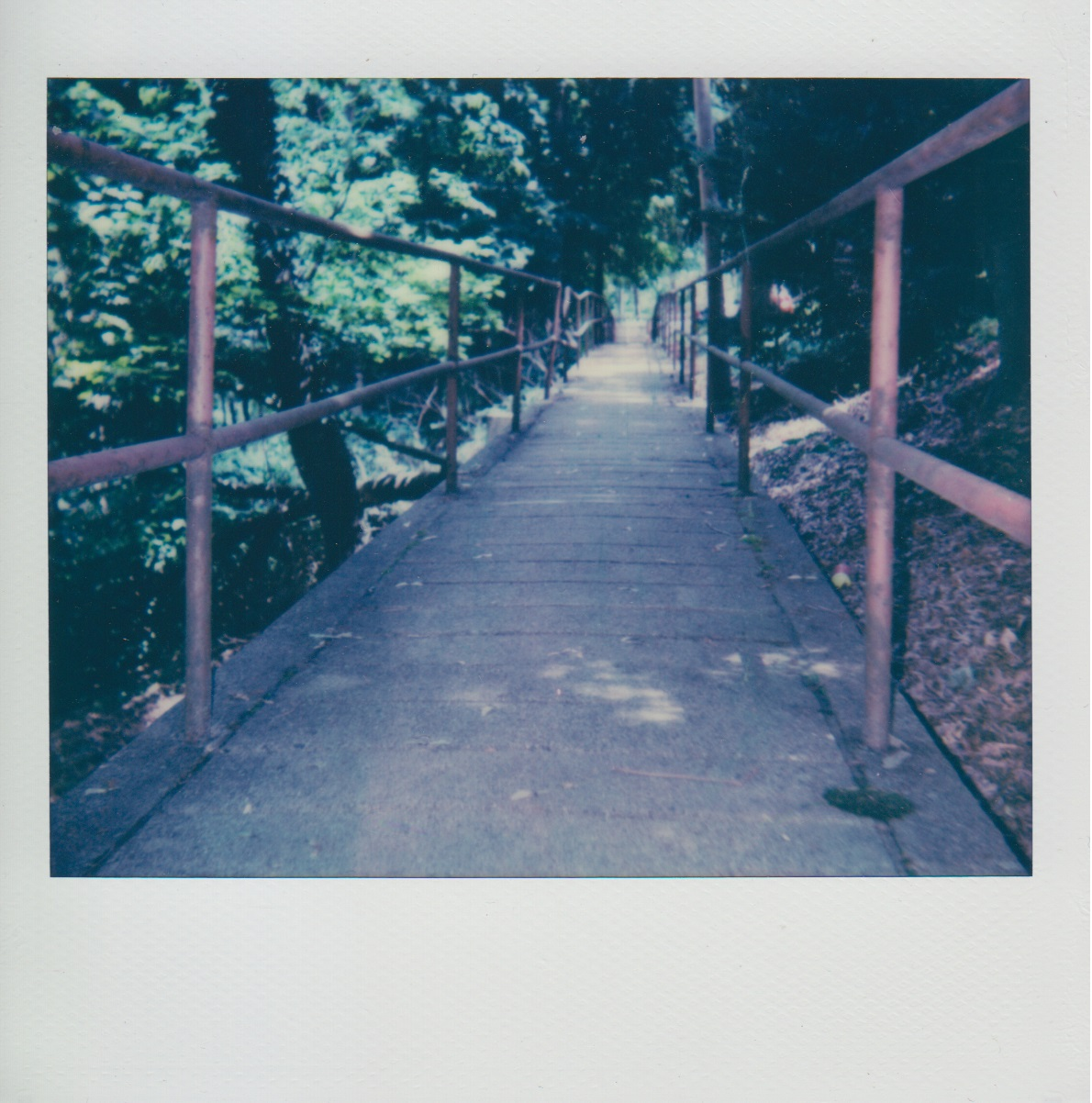
A raised city steps catwalk connects Oakwood Road to Balver Street in Oakwood.

The Oakwood neighborhood has six distinct flights of city steps, many of which are open and in a safe condition. In Oakwood, the public stairways in Pittsburgh connect pedestrians to public transportation and provide an easy way to travel to neighborhood recreational amenities.

== Surrounding communities ==
Oakwood has four borders, including Crafton to the north, Green Tree to the south, and the Pittsburgh neighborhoods of Westwood to the east and East Carnegie to the west.

== See also ==
- List of Pittsburgh neighborhoods
