= Brookline (Pittsburgh) =

- Neighborhood of Pittsburgh
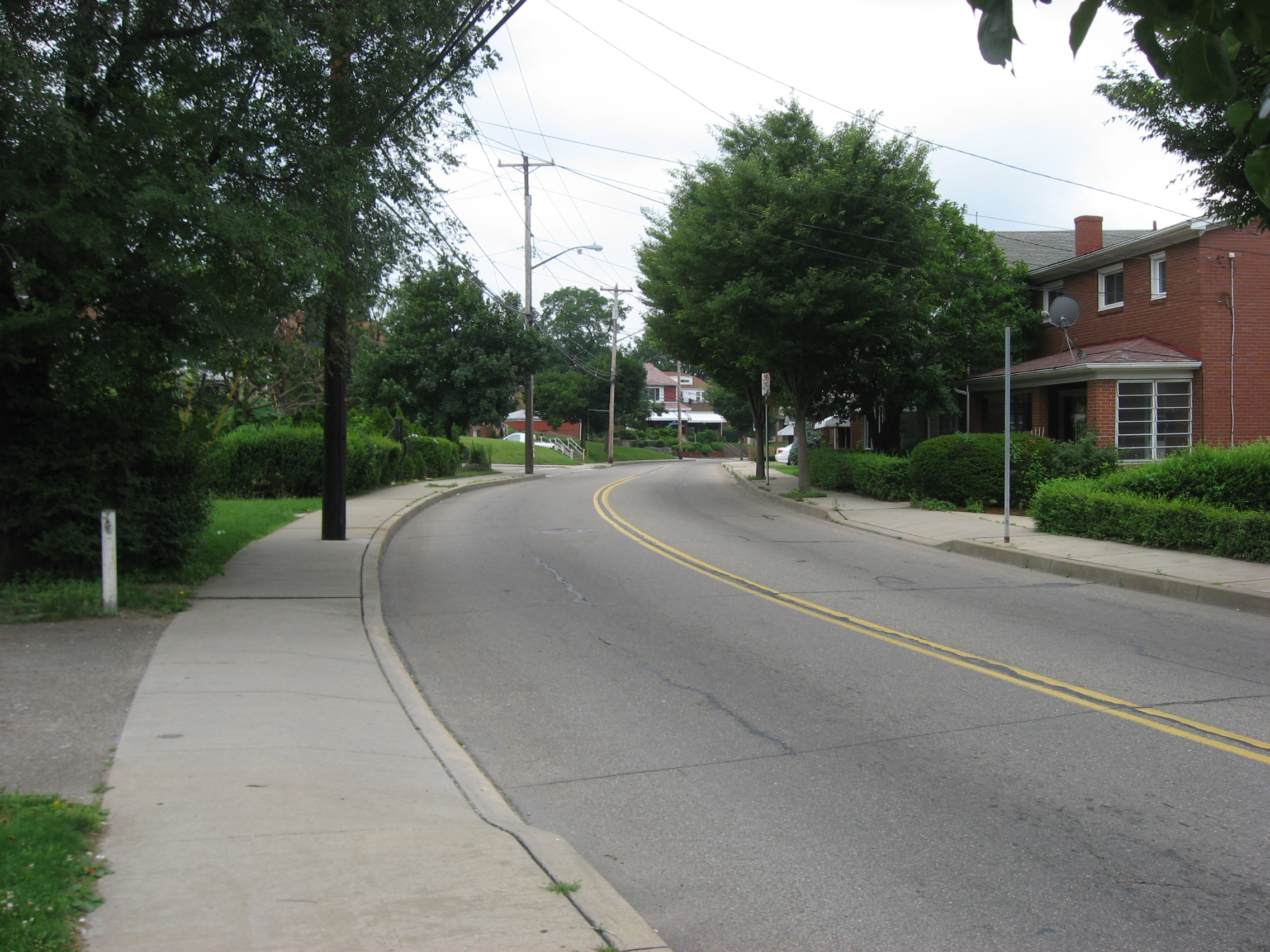
- Along Pioneer Avenue in Brookline

- Coordinates: 40.397°N 80.014°W
- Country: United States
- State: Pennsylvania
- County: Allegheny County
- City: Pittsburgh
- Named for: Brookline, Massachusetts

Area
  - Total: 2.082 sq mi (5.39 km^{2})

Population (2010)
  - Total: 13,214
  - Density: 6,347/sq mi (2,451/km^{2})

Brookline is a neighborhood in the South Hills of Pittsburgh, Pennsylvania, United States. It takes its name from the town in Massachusetts, which early settlers felt bore a resemblance to the area.

== History ==
=== Early settlement ===
Brookline was a part of the larger West Liberty Borough before its absorption into Pittsburgh in 1908. Early in its history, the area was mostly inhabited by miners and farmers. At the turn of the century, when the mining industry in the area declined, only farms were left.

=== Dawn of the 20th century ===
The dawn of the 20th century brought many technological advances that helped the South Hills of Pittsburgh flourish. First, the transportation of coal from the area opened up the Pittsburgh & Castle Shannon Railroad Co. to install lines going to the area. This included a tunnel to be bored from downtown Pittsburgh, through Mt. Washington, and to exit right above South Hills Junction. With the age of automobiles looming, a few decades later the Liberty Tunnel was completed. This helped create a boom in the South Hills areas.

=== Trolley service ===
Brookline was linked by streetcar to downtown Pittsburgh in 1905 by Pittsburgh Railways who built a single line south along West Liberty Avenue, turning east on a private right of way and then following Brookline Boulevard to Saw Mill Run. This initial line was cut back to Edgebrook Avenue a year later, but in 1909 the track was doubled and a loop put in near the end of Witt Street. In 1915 the line was extended south along West Liberty Avenue to Dormont where it linked with the 42 Dormont line. The 39 Brookline service closed in 1966.

== Surrounding communities ==
Brookline has seven borders, including the Pittsburgh neighborhoods of Beechview to the northwest, Bon Air to the northeast, Carrick to the east and Overbrook to the southeast. The remaining borders are with Baldwin Township to the south, Mt. Lebanon to the southwest and Dormont to the west.

== See also ==
- List of Pittsburgh neighborhoods
