= East Hills (Pittsburgh) =

Neighborhood in Pittsburgh

- Neighborhood of Pittsburgh
- Coordinates: 40.454°N 79.876°W
- Country: United States
- State: Pennsylvania
- County: Allegheny County
- City: Pittsburgh

Area
  - Total: 0.541 sq mi (1.40 km^{2})

Population (2020)
  - Total: 2,892
  - Density: 5,350/sq mi (2,060/km^{2})
- ZIP Code: 15221

East Hills is a neighborhood in the east side of Pittsburgh, Pennsylvania, United States. Its ZIP Code is 15221. It has representation on Pittsburgh City Council by the council member for District 9 (north north-east neighborhoods).

== About ==
East Hills has four borders, including Penn Hills to the north and northeast, Wilkinsburg to the east, south and southwest, and the Pittsburgh neighborhoods of Homewood South to the west and Homewood North to the northwest.

East Hills is home to the Imani Christian Academy which is based in the former East Hills Elementary school building.

In 1960, East Hills Shopping Center was built on Robinson Boulevard. Anchored by a Joseph Horne Company store, the mall became largely vacant in the 1980s and was ultimately demolished.

== City steps ==
The East Hills neighborhood has five distinct flights of city steps - all of which are open. Constructed in the late 1940s, the public stairways in Pittsburgh were designed to connect pedestrians to public transportation and the business corridors in Homewood and Wilkinsburg. While the East Hills neighborhood has suffered from depopulation in more recent decades, the city steps along Dornbush Street are popular with runners and cyclists. With a 32% grade, Dornbush is the second steepest street in Pittsburgh and ideal for endurance training.

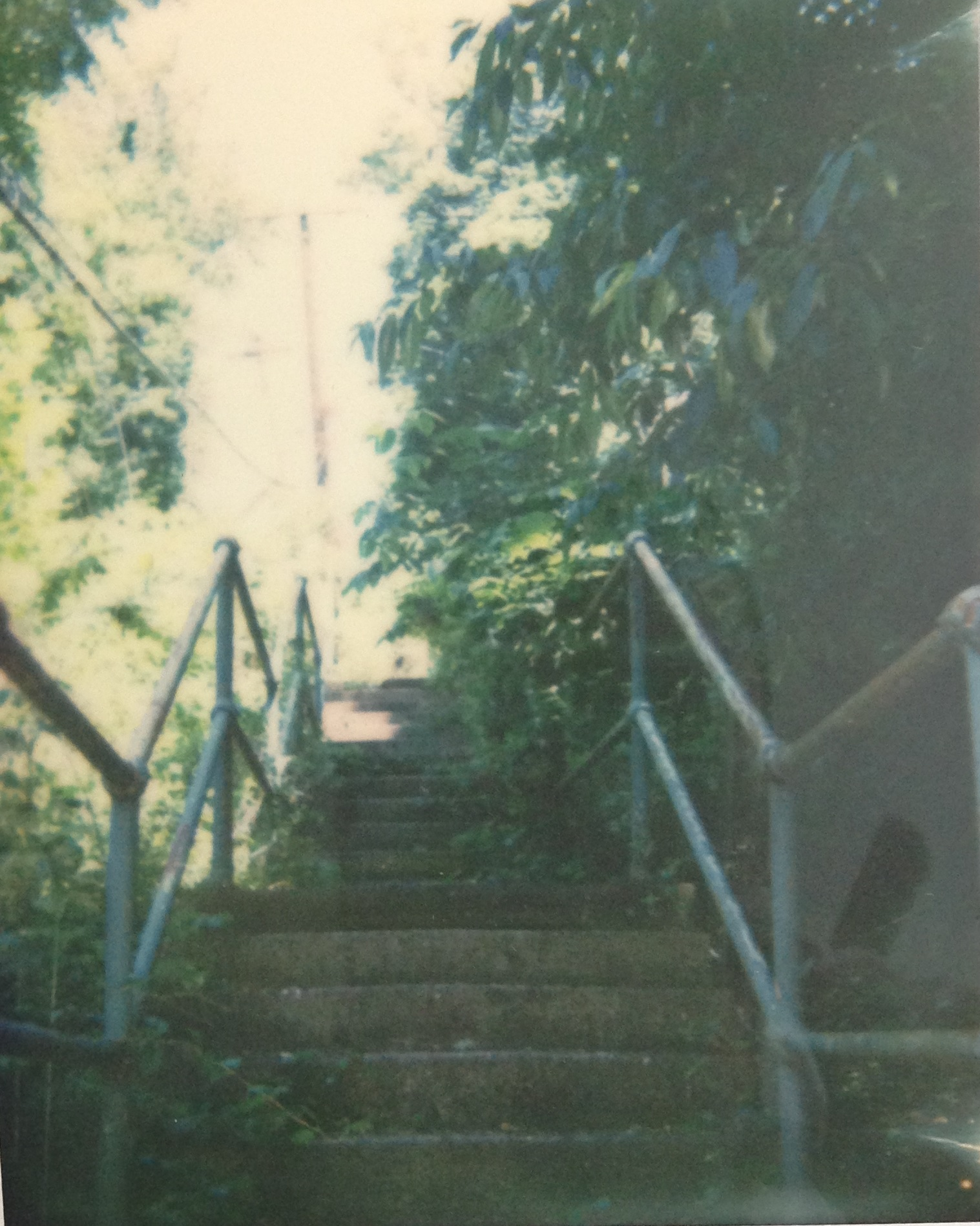
The Inglenook Place city steps in East Hills

== See also ==
- List of Pittsburgh neighborhoods
