= Lincoln Elementary School (Pittsburgh, Pennsylvania) =

- U.S. National Register of Historic Places
- City of Pittsburgh Historic Structure
- Pittsburgh Landmark – PHLF
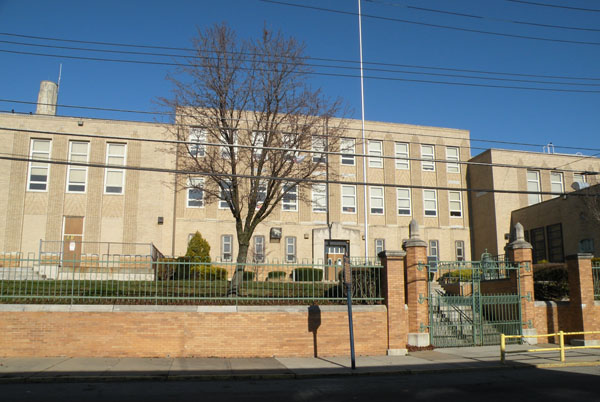

- Location within Pittsburgh Location within Pennsylvania Location within the United States
- Location: Lincoln and Frankstown Aves., Pittsburgh, Pennsylvania
- Coordinates: 40°27′36″N 79°54′43″W
- Area: 1 acre (0.40 ha)
- Built: 1931
- Architect: Pringle, Thomas; Robling, Oliver J.
- Architectural style: Art Deco
- MPS: Pittsburgh Public Schools TR
- NRHP reference No.: 86002685

Significant dates
- Added to NRHP: September 30, 1986
- Designated CPHS: November 30, 1999
- Designated PHLF: 2001

The Lincoln Elementary School (also known as Pittsburgh Lincoln PreK-5) is a public elementary school in the Larimer neighborhood of Pittsburgh, Pennsylvania.

== History and architectural features ==
It was built in 1931 and listed on the National Register of Historic Places in 1986.

A state historical marker placed near the front of the building on Frankstown Avenue says:

Mary Lou Williams (1910–1981) – Famed jazz composer and pianist. A child prodigy, she grew up in this city; went to Lincoln School here, 1919–23. Played for Andy Kirk in 1930s; then arranged music for Duke Ellington and others. Major works include "Zodiac Suite" and "Mary Lou's Mass."
