= Crafton Heights =

- Neighborhood of Pittsburgh
- Coordinates: 40.445°N 80.052°W
- Country: United States
- State: Pennsylvania
- County: Allegheny County
- City: Pittsburgh

Area
  - Total: 0.754 sq mi (1.95 km^{2})

Population (2020)
  - Total: 3,999
  - Density: 5,300/sq mi (2,050/km^{2})

Crafton Heights is a neighborhood in the 28th Ward of the City of Pittsburgh.

== City Steps ==
The Crafton Heights neighborhood has nine distinct flights of city steps, many of which are open and in a safe condition. In Crafton Heights, the steps of Pittsburgh provide residents with a safe way to walk throughout their neighborhood and allow access to public transportation.

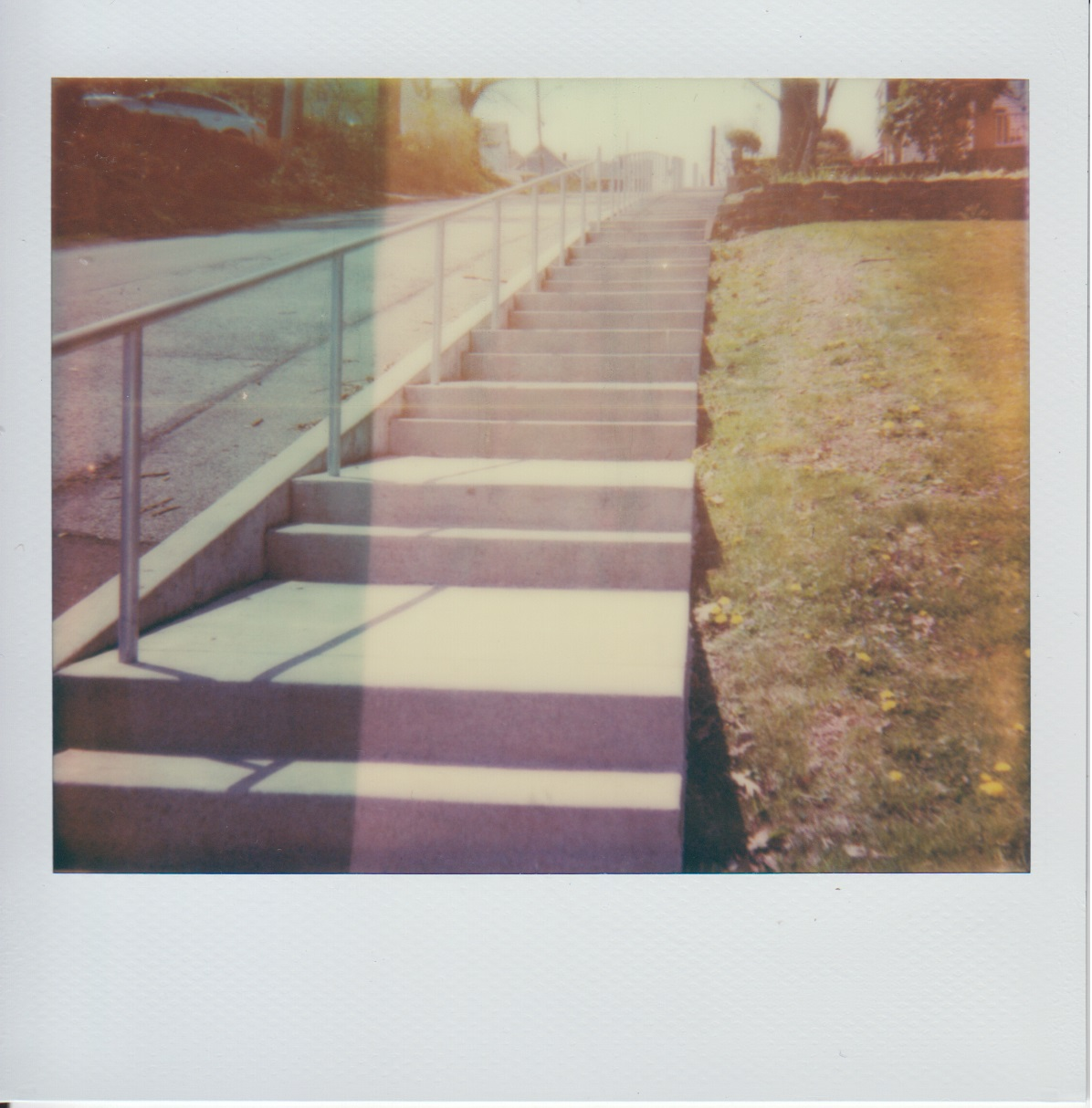
The recently refurbished Round Top Street city stairs in Crafton Heights Pittsburgh

== Surrounding communities ==
Crafton Heights is located west of downtown Pittsburgh. It borders the Pittsburgh neighborhoods of Sheraden to the north, Elliott to the east, and Westwood to the south. It also borders the boroughs of Crafton to the southwest and Ingram to the west.

== See also ==
- List of Pittsburgh neighborhoods
