= Homewood (Pittsburgh) =

- Neighborhood of Pittsburgh
- Coordinates: 40.457°N 79.895°W
- Country: United States
- State: Pennsylvania
- County: Allegheny County
- City: Pittsburgh

Area
  - Total: 1.03 sq mi (2.7 km^{2})

Population (2010)
  - Total: 6,442
  - Density: 6,250/sq mi (2,410/km^{2})

Homewood North
- Neighborhood of Pittsburgh
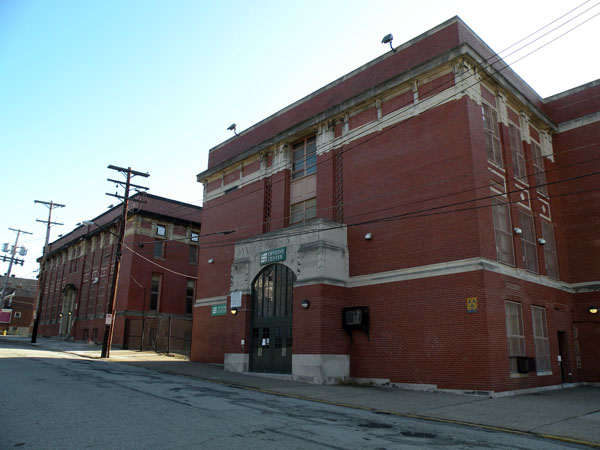
- Baxter High School

- Coordinates: 40.460°N 79.900°W

Area
  - Total: 0.434 sq mi (1.12 km^{2})

Population (2010)
  - Total: 3,280
  - Density: 7,560/sq mi (2,920/km^{2})

Homewood South
- Neighborhood of Pittsburgh
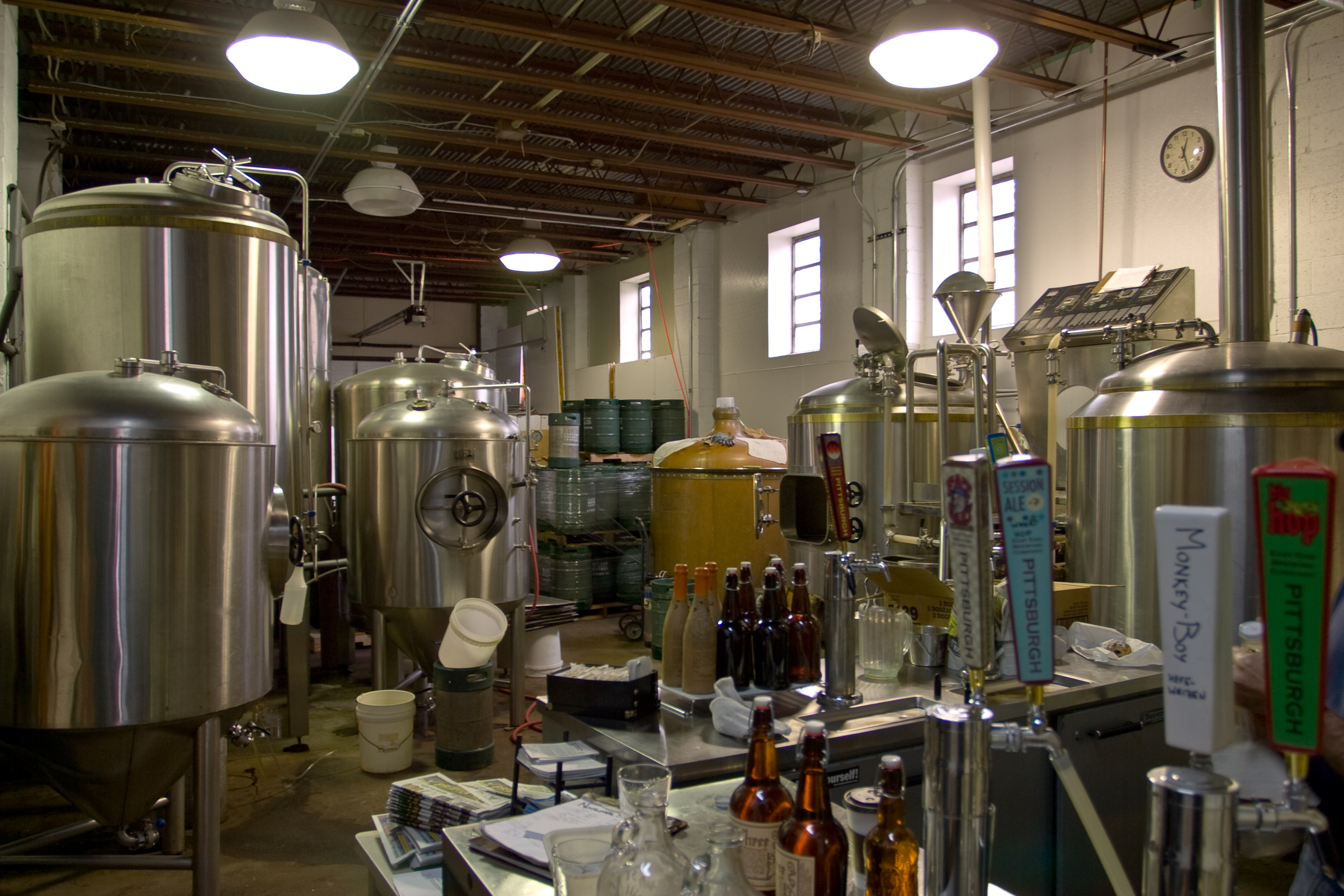
- East End Brewing Company

- Coordinates: 40.455°N 79.900°W

Area
  - Total: 0.398 sq mi (1.03 km^{2})

Population (2010)
  - Total: 2,344
  - Density: 5,890/sq mi (2,270/km^{2})

Homewood West
- Neighborhood of Pittsburgh
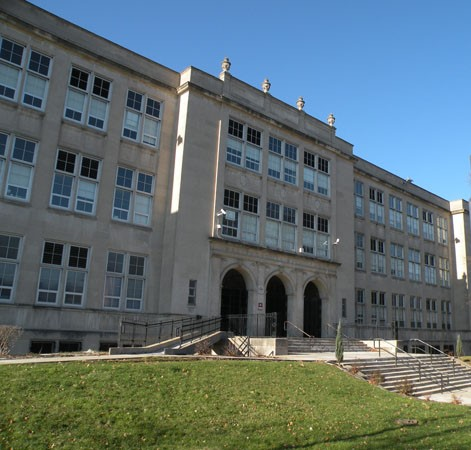
- Westinghouse High School

- Coordinates: 40.460°N 79.905°W

Area
  - Total: 0.199 sq mi (0.52 km^{2})

Population (2010)
  - Total: 818
  - Density: 4,110/sq mi (1,590/km^{2})
- ZIP Code: 15206, 15208

Homewood is a predominantly African-American neighborhood of Pittsburgh, Pennsylvania, United States, officially divided into three neighborhoods: Homewood North, Homewood South and Homewood West.

Homewood is bordered on the southwest by the Martin Luther King Jr. East Busway which follows the old Pennsylvania Railroad line toward downtown Pittsburgh.

== Geography ==
Homewood is located in the easternmost part of Pittsburgh. Parts of Homewood's Northern and Eastern border are shared with Penn Hills Township. Within the city of Pittsburgh, Homewood is bordered by the following neighborhoods: on the east by East Hills; on the west by Larimer; on the North by Lincoln-Lemington Belmar; and on the south by North Point Breeze.

== History ==
Homewood was founded in 1832 by Judge William Wilkins. The earliest black residents moved into the sparsely populated area in the aftermath of the Civil War. Homewood was annexed by the city of Pittsburgh on December 1, 1884 and held in those years mainly estates for the wealthy, being the Pittsburgh residence of industrialists Andrew Carnegie and Thomas M. Carnegie until the late 1880s. Starting in the 1910s, Irish, Italian, German, and upper middle class black families started moving into Homewood due to the low cost of housing. This caused Homewood to become more diverse. At first relations between the white and black residents of Homewood were quite good, it was not until later that tensions between the different ethnic groups became more strained.

In the 1950s the city claimed land in the Lower Hill District for the Civic Arena, and in the process, displaced 8,000 people. Most of them were less affluent blacks who then settled in rental apartments in Homewood, creating a large disparity in the number of blacks to whites in the region. This sudden influx of black residents caused a lot of the white middle class to move away from Homewood, creating a population shift from 22% black in 1950 to 66% black in 1960. As a result of the area being predominantly African-American, it was greatly affected by the assassination of Dr. Martin Luther King Jr. on 4 April 1968, whose murder caused riots in Homewood. The riots caused great damage to local businesses, severely crippling the business district there.

In the 1970s and early 1980s, Homewood's identity and reputation were further degraded by the proliferation of gangs dealing in illegal drugs. The Homewood-Brushton Revitalization and the Development Corporation put together a strong effort to rebuild the area, it accomplished this by building homes and helping to open new businesses.

== Demographics ==
The 2000 Census demographics of the neighborhood are 98.3% African American, 0.6% White, 0.3% Asian, 0.0% American Indian, and 0.8% from 2 or more races. The 2010 Census demographics of Homewood are 97.8% African American, 1.2% White, 0.3% American Indian, 0.15% Asian, 0.04% Native Hawaiian, and 0.37% other.

== Neighborhoods ==
Homewood is officially divided into three neighborhoods: Homewood North, Homewood South and Homewood West.

- Homewood North is a neighborhood in Pittsburgh, Pennsylvania, USA's east city area. It has zip codes of both 15221 and 15208, and has representation on Pittsburgh City Council by both the council members for District 9 (Northeast Neighborhoods).
- Homewood South is a neighborhood in Pittsburgh, Pennsylvania, USA's east city area. It has ZIP Codes of both 15208 and 15221, and has representation on Pittsburgh City Council by the council member for District 9 (Northeast Neighborhoods).
- Homewood West is a neighborhood in Pittsburgh, Pennsylvania, USA's east city area. It has ZIP Codes of both 15206 and 15208, and has representation on Pittsburgh City Council by the council member for District 9 (Northeast Neighborhoods).
  - Notable: Charles 'Teenie' Harris, photographer
  - Mary Cardwell Dawson, founder of the National Negro Opera Company

== Education ==
Homewood is located in the Pittsburgh Public Schools district. The area offers a mix of neighborhood schools as well as specialized magnet schools. The public schools are Pittsburgh Lincoln School (K-5), Pittsburgh Faison School (K-5), and Westinghouse High School (6–12). Higher education includes the Community College of Allegheny County's Homewood Brushton Center.

== Employment ==
Homewood's unemployment rate is higher than in most other parts of Pittsburgh. Consequently, Homewood's income per capita and median household income are lower than both the Pittsburgh average as well as the Pennsylvania average. Of the employed population, men earn more per person on average than women; however, there are more employed women in Homewood than men.

== Transportation ==
Homewood is served by the Homewood station on the Martin Luther King Jr. East Busway.

== City Steps ==
The Homewood neighborhood has 8 distinct flights of city steps – many of which are open and in a safe condition. In Homewood, the Steps of Pittsburgh quickly connect pedestrians to public transportation and provide an easy way to travel through this hilly area.

== Points of interest ==
- Afro-American Music Institute
- Carnegie Library

== Notable people ==
- Martell Covington, Pennsylvania State Representative

== See also ==
- List of Pittsburgh neighborhoods
