= List of Carnegie libraries in Pennsylvania =

The following list of Carnegie libraries in Pennsylvania provides detailed information on United States Carnegie libraries in Pennsylvania, where 59 public libraries were built from 27 grants (totaling $5,169,587) awarded by the Carnegie Corporation of New York from 1886 to 1917. Notably, Allegheny County, Pennsylvania contains the first Carnegie libraries ever donated by the philanthropist, owing to his personal connection to the Pittsburgh area. Architectural Critic Patricia Lowry calls them "Pittsburgh's most significant cultural export".

Five out of the first seven, six of the first ten, and seven of the first twelve libraries that Carnegie commissioned in America are in Allegheny County. Also, eleven of the first fourteen Carnegie funded libraries to open in America were in Allegheny County. In all, 19 libraries were commissioned in the county and several of them are more than just libraries but are cultural centers as well.

Also among the libraries built were 25 in Philadelphia which are listed separately. In addition to public libraries, academic libraries were built for 9 institutions, more than any other state. These grants totaled $441,000. In addition Carnegie founded two entire colleges in Pittsburgh, Carnegie Institute of Technology and Margaret Morrison College for Women. Both are today part of Carnegie Mellon University.

== Key ==
Building still operating as a library
Building standing, but now serving another purpose
Building no longer standing
Building listed on the National Register of Historic Places

== Philadelphia ==
The following list of Carnegie libraries in Philadelphia provides detailed information on United States Carnegie libraries in Philadelphia, where 25 libraries were built from 1 grant (totaling $1,500,000) awarded by the Carnegie Corporation of New York on January 5, 1903.

	Library	Image	Location	Notes
1	Chestnut Hill		8711 Germantown Avenue (19118); 40°04′38″N 75°12′32″W	
2	Cobbs Creek		5800 Cobbs Creek Parkway, (19143); 39°56′45″N 75°14′29″W	
3	Falls of Schuylkill		3501 Midvale Avenue (19129) 40°00′51″N 75°11′31″W	
4	Frankford		4634 Frankford Avenue (19124)	Replaced by modern building
5	Germantown		5818 Germantown Avenue (19144); 40°02′14″N 75°10′34″W	Senior citizens center
6	Greenwich			Original razed
7	Haddington		446 North 65th Street (19151); 39°58′12″N 75°14′58″W	
8	Kingsessing		1201 South 51st Street (19143); 39°56′33″N 75°13′09″W	
9	Lehigh		601 West Lehigh Avenue (19133); 39°59′32″N 75°08′32″W	Renamed Lillian Marerro Branch ca. 2005
10	Logan		1333 Wagner Avenue (19141), 40°01′53″N 75°08′43″W	
11	Manayunk		Fleming and Dupont Streets (19128); 40°01′52″N 75°13′20″W	Now an apartment building
12	McPherson Square		601 East Indiana Avenue (19134); 39°59′41″N 75°07′08″W	
13	Nicetown		1715 Hunting Park Avenue (19124)	Replaced by modern building in 1961, at 3720 Broad Street 19140
14	Oak Lane		6614 North 12th Street (19126); 40°03′12″N 75°08′16″W	Land gift of citizens of Oak Lane and Vicinity
15	Paschalville		6942 Woodland Avenue (19142); 39°55′13″N 75°14′27″W	Faces South 70th Street
16	Passyunk		1935 Shunk Street (19145); 39°55′11″N 75°10′49″W	Opened 1914, Renamed 2004: Thomas F. Donatucci Sr. Branch
17	Richmond		2987 Almond Street (19134); 39°58′59″N 75°06′31″W	
18	South Philadelphia		2407 S Broad Street	
19	Southwark		1108 South 5th Street	Now houses Philadelphia Overseas Chinese Association
20	Spring Garden		1700 Spring Garden Street	Razed
21	Tacony		6742 Torresdale Avenue (19135); 40°01′31″N 75°02′43″W	Land gift of Jacob S. Disston, Esq. 1906
22	Thomas Holme		7810 Frankford Avenue (19136); 40°02′25″N 75°01′52″W	Holmesburg Library Land gift of Lower Dublin Academy
23	Walnut Street		140 South 40th Street (19104); 39°57′15″N 75°12′09″W	West Philadelphia Branch
24	Wissahickon		Manayunk Avenue and Osbourne Street	Razed
25	Wyoming		231 East Wyoming Avenue (19120); 40°01′16″N 75°07′17″W	Opened October 30, 1930, it was the last library funded by Carnegie.

== Public libraries ==
	Library	Locality	Image	Date granted	Grant amount	Location	Notes
1	Allegheny	Allegheny County—North Side of Pittsburgh, formerly known as Allegheny City		1886	$481,012	6 Allegheny Square East	The first Carnegie Library in the US to be commissioned and the second to open. Dedicated by Carnegie and U.S. President Benjamin Harrison on February 20, 1890. Also houses the first Carnegie Hall in the US, which is now used by the New Hazlett Theater. And starting in 2017, the library space is being renovated and being turned into the Museum Lab, which is a part of the Children's Museum across the street, and will open in April 2019.
2	Beaver Falls	Beaver Falls, Beaver County		Aug 15, 1899	$50,000	1301 7th Ave.	The 20th Carnegie Library in the U.S. to be commissioned.
3	Braddock	Allegheny County -- Braddock		1887	$357,782	419 Library St. 40°24′07″N 79°51′56″W	The first Carnegie Library in the US to open and the second to be commissioned. Dedicated by Carnegie and U.S. President Benjamin Harrison on March 30, 1889. Originally, it was not a publicly supported library but was fully funded by the Carnegie Steel Co. and governed by its officials. The first of four such libraries in the US to be fully endowed. An 1893 expansion doubled the size of the building and includes the third Carnegie Music Hall in the US, a Gymnasium, and a swimming pool (currently out of use).
4	Bradford	Bradford, McKean County	Free to the Public	Jan 19, 1900	$40,000	27 Congress St.	Library moved to a new building in 1991. Now a restaurant, Beefeaters at the Historic Carnegie Library.
5	Butler	Butler, Butler County		May 3, 1917	$37,000	218 N. McKean St.	The last library commissioned by Carnegie in Pennsylvania and among the last in the entire country. Opened 1921; renovated 1966 and 2003
6	Carnegie	Allegheny County -- Carnegie		Apr 26, 1898	$310,000	300 Beechwood Ave.	The seventh Carnegie Library in the USA commissioned and the third to be fully endowed. Opened May 1, 1901. Official name: Andrew Carnegie Free Library. Of the 2,509 libraries built by Andrew Carnegie, it was the only public library granted permission to use both his first and last names. In addition to the library, it includes a 788-seat Music Hall, 140-seat Lecture Hall, Civil War Museum, and a small in-town park.
7	Connellsville	Connellsville, Fayette County		Apr 22, 1899	$75,000	299 S. Pittsburgh St.	The 13th library in the US to receive a grant.
8	Corry	Corry, Erie County		Nov 9, 1916	$15,000	203 N. Center St.	Now a restaurant
9	Duquesne	Allegheny County -- Duquesne		Jan 23, 1901	$310,000		The fourth and final library to be fully endowed. Carnegie had a Steel Mill here. Demolished in June 1968
10	Easton	Easton, Northampton County		Jul 4, 1901	$57,500	515 Church St.	
11	Edgewood	Allegheny County -- Edgewood		May 8, 1914	$12,500	4400 Greensburg Pike	C.C. Mellor Memorial Library, opened September 1, 1916. Named for Charles C. Mellor, one of the original trustees, appointed by Andrew Carnegie, of the Carnegie Library of Pittsburgh.
12	Hamburg	Hamburg, Berks County		Feb 20, 1903	$10,000	35 N. 3rd St.	
13	Homestead	Allegheny County -- Munhall		Nov 27, 1896	$322,067	510 E. 10th Ave.	The sixth Carnegie Library in the US to be commissioned and the second to be fully endowed. Opened November 5, 1898. It was the 7th to open—the Lawrenceville branch of Pittsburgh, commissioned at the same time as its main branch, opened 6 months earlier. Also contains a Carnegie Music Hall, a lecture hall, a gymnasium, a swimming pool, and a bowling alley.
14	Johnstown	Johnstown, Cambria County		Mar 9, 1890	$55,332	304 Washington St.	The fourth Carnegie Library commissioned in the US and the first outside of Allegheny County, Pennsylvania. Now the Johnstown Flood Museum.
15	Mansfield	Mansfield, Tioga County		Mar 29, 1911	$5,000	71 N. Main St.	
16	McKeesport	Allegheny County -- McKeesport		Apr 2, 1899	$50,000	1507 Library Ave.	The 12th library in the US to receive a grant from Carnegie. Opened July 15, 1902.
17	Midland	Midland, Beaver County		May 8, 1914	$20,000	61 9th St.	
18	North Bessemer	Allegheny County -- Penn Hills		May 1, 1901	$20,600		Demolished in the 1950s
19	Oakmont	Allegheny County -- Oakmont		Jan 24, 1899	$25,000	700 Allegheny River Blvd.	The tenth library in the US to receive a grant. Opened 1901.
20	Oil City	Oil City, Venango County		Apr 12, 1900	$44,000	2 Central Ave.	
21	Phoenixville	Phoenixville, Chester County		Mar 9, 1901	$20,000	183 2nd Ave.	Library trustees contacted Carnegie with their request in 1901. The new building, made of Avondale Stone and Indiana Limestone, opened in September 1902. In 1987 an addition was added to one side of the building to increase space and add ADA access.
22	Pittsburgh Main	Allegheny County -- Pittsburgh		Feb 6, 1890	$1,160,614	4400 Forbes Ave.	The third Carnegie Library commissioned in the US and the first to have multiple branches. Main library dedicated November 5, 1895, at which time Carnegie announced an additional gift to enlarge the building. The mammoth structure in the Oakland neighborhood of Pittsburgh contains the Main Library, Carnegie Music Hall (the fourth to open in the USA), Carnegie Museum of Natural History, and Carnegie Museum of Art.
23	Pittsburgh East Liberty	Pittsburgh		Feb 6, 1890	—		Opened 1905, demolished in the 1960s. In 1967 a new Carnegie library opened at a different location in East Liberty. That structure was renovated in 2010 by Edge Studio.
24	Pittsburgh Hazelwood	Pittsburgh		Feb 6, 1890	—	4748 Monongahela St.	Opened August 15, 1900. The eleventh Carnegie funded library to open in America. Relocated to Second Avenue in 2004.
25	Pittsburgh Homewood	Pittsburgh		?	$160,500	7101 Hamilton Ave.	Opened 1910, it was not part of Carnegie's original grant to Pittsburgh but part of a later gift. It's the last library Carnegie built in the city of Pittsburgh and is much bigger than a typical branch building. It's the library featured in episodes of the PBS show Mr. Rogers Neighborhood. Includes 300-seat auditorium. Renovated 2004.
26	Pittsburgh Lawrenceville	Pittsburgh		Feb 6, 1890	—	279 Fisk St.	Opened May 10, 1898. The 6th Carnegie Library to open in the US, it was the first 'self-service' library using an open-stacks policy. It was planned so one librarian could oversee the entire operation with a circulation desk flanked by turnstiles that admitted readers to the open stacks one at a time. Also the first library to have a room for children. The reading rooms were separated by walls that became glass partitions above waist level—under the watchful eye of the librarian.
27	Pittsburgh Mount Washington	Pittsburgh		Feb 6, 1890	—	315 Grandview Ave.	Opened May 31, 1900; the tenth Carnegie funded library to open in America
28	Pittsburgh South Side	Pittsburgh		Feb 6, 1890	—	2205 E. Carson St.	Opened January 30, 1908, the last of those which were financed from Mr. Carnegie's original gift to the city.
29	Pittsburgh West End	Pittsburgh		Feb 6, 1890	—	47 Wabash St.	Opened January 31, 1899. The eighth Carnegie funded library to open in America. It was Carnegie's second library (after Lawrenceville branch) to have open shelves for patrons and second neighborhood branch—which he scaled down considerably from the huge structures built as central libraries and cultural centers such as Braddock, Allegheny, Homestead, and Pittsburgh Main Branch.
30	Pittsburgh Wylie Avenue	Pittsburgh		Feb 6, 1890	—	1911 Wylie Ave.	Opened June 1, 1899. The ninth Carnegie funded library to open in America. Branch relocated in 1982. Original building now a mosque
31	Pottsville	Pottsville, Schuylkill County		Jan 28, 1916	$45,000	215 W. Market St.	
32	Reading	Reading, Berks County		Apr 16, 1910	$111,180	100 S. 5th St.	Dedicated May 15, 1913
33	Ridley Park	Ridley Park, Delaware County		Jun 24, 1911	$10,000	107 E. Ward St.	Dedicated July 4, 1912
34	Swissvale	Allegheny County -- Swissvale		Nov 17, 1914	$25,000	1800 Monongahela Ave.	Opened February 4, 1918. The last Library built by Carnegie in his adopted home of Allegheny County.

== Academic libraries ==
	Institution	Locality	Image	Date granted	Grant amount	Location	Notes
1	Bucknell University	Lewisburg, Union County		Mar 10, 1904	$30,000		Now houses the history department
2	College of Physicians	Philadelphia		Mar 4, 1903	$100,000	19 S. 22nd St. 39°57′12″N 75°10′36″W	
3	Grove City College	Grove City, Mercer County		Apr 28, 1900	$32,000		Now the alumni center
4	Institute for Colored Youth	Cheyney		Jul 12, 1905	$10,000		
5	Juniata College	Huntingdon, Huntingdon County		Mar 15, 1905	$28,000		Now an art museum
6	Lebanon Valley College	Annville		Feb 5, 1904	$20,000		Now the admissions office
7	Pennsylvania State College	State College		Jun 26, 1902	$150,000		Now the College of Communications
8	Perkiomen Seminary	Pennsburg	Carnegie Library of The Perkiomen School	Apr 24, 1906; Jan 2, 1913	$6,000 $15,000		
9	Swarthmore College	Swarthmore		Feb 2, 1906	$50,000		Open 1907–1967, burned September 16, 1983

== See also ==
- List of libraries in the United States
