= Carnegie Library of Pittsburgh =

Public library system in Pittsburgh, Pennsylvania

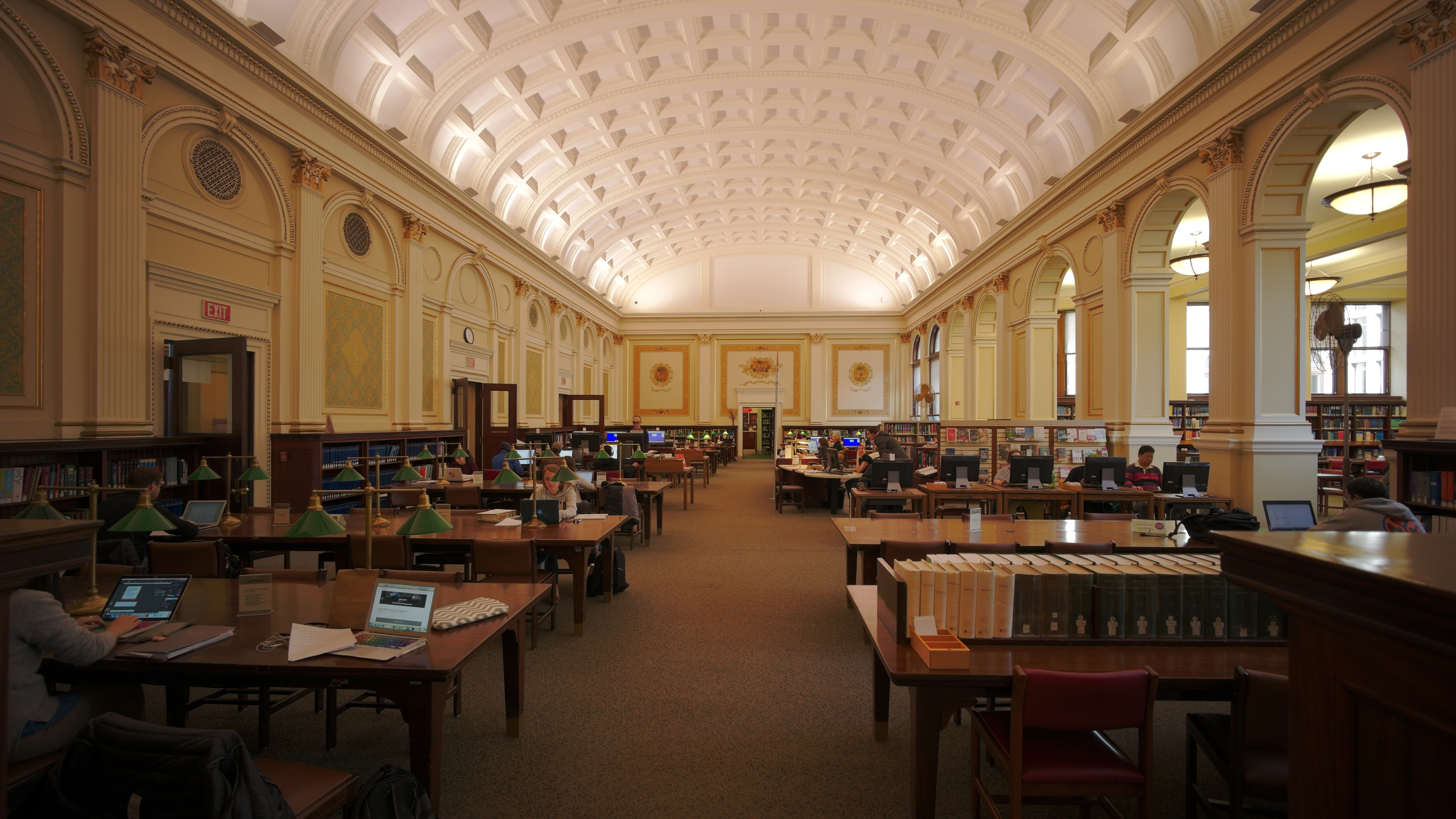
- Interior view of the main branch in the Oakland neighborhood
- 40°26′34″N 79°57′03″W
- Location: Pittsburgh, Pennsylvania
- Established: February 6, 1890

Collection
- Size: 5,230,200

Access and use
- Circulation: 3,529,379
- Population served: 2.6 million
- Members: 294,733

Other information
- Budget: $26,879,454
- Website: www.CarnegieLibrary.org
- Carnegie Library of Pittsburgh
- U.S. National Register of Historic Places
- Pittsburgh Landmark – PHLF
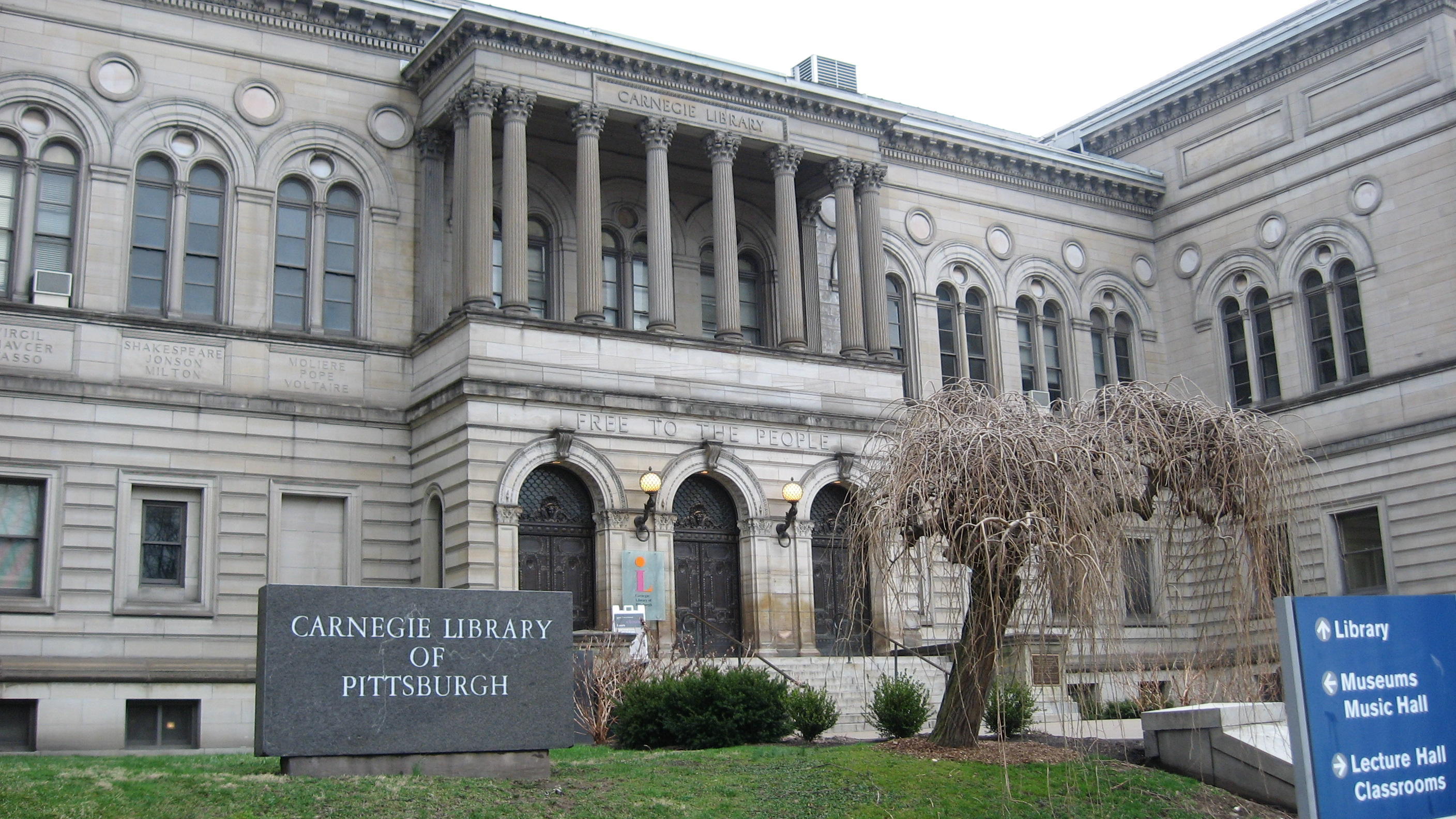
- Carnegie Library of Pittsburgh Main Branch in the city's Oakland neighborhood

- Location within Pittsburgh Location within Pennsylvania Location within the United States
- Location: 4400 Forbes Ave., Pittsburgh, Pennsylvania
- Area: 9.5 acres (3.8 ha)
- NRHP reference No.: 79002158

Significant dates
- Added to NRHP: March 30, 1979
- Designated PHLF: 1970

The Carnegie Library of Pittsburgh is the public library system in Pittsburgh, Pennsylvania. Its main branch is located in the Oakland neighborhood of Pittsburgh, and it has 19 branch locations throughout the city. Like hundreds of other Carnegie libraries, the construction of the main library, which opened in 1895, and several neighborhood branches, was funded by industrialist Andrew Carnegie. The Pittsburgh area houses the first branches in the United States.

The Pittsburgh Photographic Library is a photography repository held by the Carnegie Library of Pittsburgh of over 50,000 prints and negatives relating to history of Pittsburgh.

== History ==
The City of Pittsburgh was originally home to eight Carnegie libraries constructed at the turn of the twentieth century. In 1881, Andrew Carnegie offered a US$250,000 grant to the city for the construction of a public library on the condition that the city provided the land and annual funding for the maintenance of the property. The city declined Carnegie's initial offer out of concern that a publicly funded library was not a state-sanctioned use of public tax funds. With the passing of several years and the state legislature's endorsement of the project, however, the city reconsidered the offer and reached out to Carnegie in the interest of accepting his grant.

In 1890, the City of Pittsburgh accepted an expanded grant of $1 million for the building of the main library in Oakland and five branches in the neighborhoods of Lawrenceville, West End, Wylie Avenue (Hill District), Mount Washington, and Hazelwood. While the initial plan only called for those five branches, the city later received another three Carnegie libraries in the East Liberty, South Side, and Homewood neighborhoods. Construction on the main library was finished in 1895 while the branch libraries were constructed over the following fifteen years, ending with the completion of the Homewood branch in 1910.

Six of the original Carnegie library branch locations continue to serve as public libraries in their respective neighborhoods: Lawrenceville, West End, Mount Washington, Hazelwood, South Side, and Homewood. The East Liberty branch was demolished in the 1960s as part of a redevelopment plan, and the Wylie Avenue branch was moved to a new location in 1982.

In January 2022, the 201 members of the United Library Workers (ULW), the union of library staff, which organized with United Steelworkers in 2019, ratified their first contract with the library's management. Environmental service workers and drivers had already been unionized with the Teamsters and SEIU.

== Branches/Locations ==
- Allegheny
- Allegheny County Law Library
- Beechview
- Brookline
- Carrick
- Downtown and Business
- East Liberty
- Hazelwood
- Hill District
- Homewood
- Knoxville
- Lawrenceville
- Library of Accessible Media for Pennsylvanians (formerly Library for the Blind and Physically Handicapped) (Bloomfield)
- Main (Oakland)
- Mt. Washington
- Sheraden
- South Side
- Squirrel Hill
- West End
- Woods Run

== Partnership with suburban libraries ==
For decades, CLP has partnered with suburban area libraries, and, in 2014, talks were started seeking innovative ways to combine some services.

== Theft case ==
In 2018, the Pittsburgh Post-Gazette reported that nearly 320 rare books, maps, engravings, and other items had been stolen from the Carnegie Library of Pittsburgh's main branch in Oakland, which houses the system's rare book collection. The items, including a 1787 document signed by Thomas Jefferson, were valued at more than $8 million. In July 2018, a former library archivist and a Pittsburgh-area bookseller were charged with the thefts, which took place over a period of two decades.

It was one of the largest rare-book theft cases in history. According to the criminal complaints detailing alleged scheme, the archivist said that he "often removed items from the Oliver Room at the library's main branch in Oakland by carrying individual plates [and] maps in manila folders, or for books or larger items, by brazenly rolling them up and walking out." The archivist is alleged to have turned the rare items over to the bookseller, who would then sell them through his store.

== See also ==
- Allegheny Regional Asset District
- Pennsylvania Library Association
