= Longfellow, Alden & Harlow =

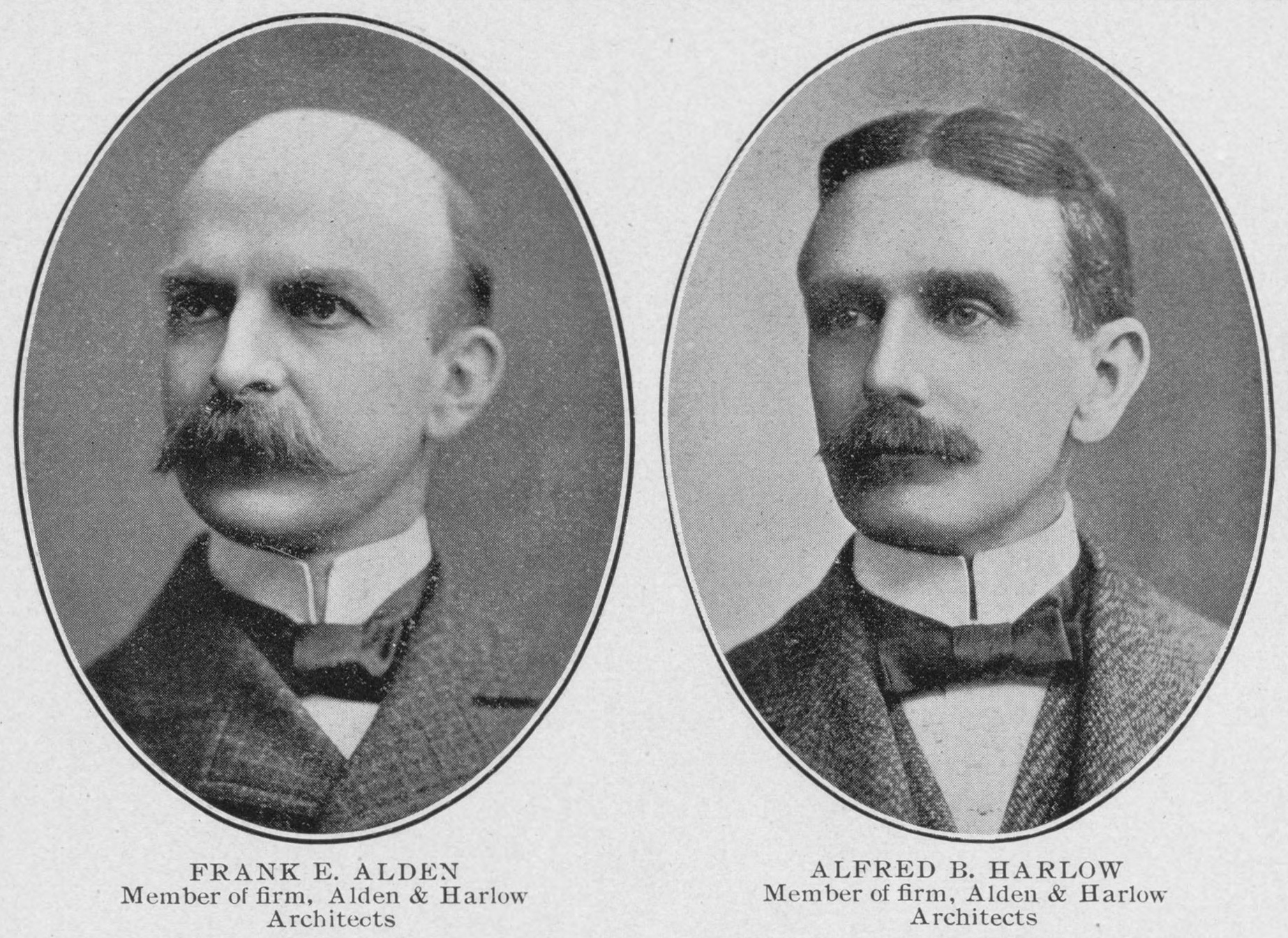
Alden and Harlow as depicted in Palmer's Pictorial Pittsburgh, 1905

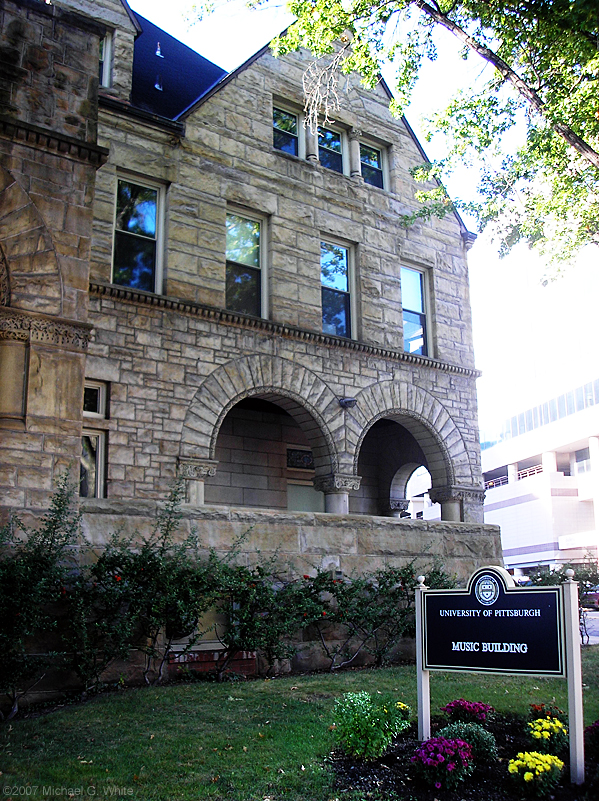
Music Building at the University of Pittsburgh, built in 1884.

Longfellow, Alden & Harlow (later Alden & Harlow), of Boston, Massachusetts, and Pittsburgh, Pennsylvania, was the architectural firm of Alexander Wadsworth Longfellow Jr. (1854–1934), Frank Ellis Alden (1859–1908), and Alfred Branch Harlow (1857–1927). The firm, successors to H. H. Richardson, continued to provide structures in the Romanesque revival style established by Richardson that is often referred to as Richardsonian Romanesque.

Officially, the firm was Longfellow & Harlow from 1886 until March 1887, with Alden participating as its agent. Then, it was Longfellow, Alden & Harlow, until 1896, when it became Alden & Harlow. The split with Longfellow is described as amicable on page 62 of Margaret Henderson Floyd's book about the firm, and it had more to do with the fact that Longfellow was in Boston and Alden & Harlow had relocated to Pittsburgh and were managing their firm there due to the number of commissions they received. After Alden died, Harlow practiced with different partners in Pittsburgh until his death. Longfellow continued to practice in Boston until his death.

The architects Frederick G. Scheibler Jr., William L. Steele, and Henry M. Seaver trained in the firm's office. Howard K. Jones was the chief draftsman for the Alden & Harlow office. According to Floyd, "other young draftsmen in the office played roles that are still for the most part unknown". The best documented picture is for the firm's largest commission: the major Carnegie Institute expansion of 1899–1907. Here Jones played a key role, assisted by Steele, Richard Hooker, and John Henry Craner.

== Selected commissions ==
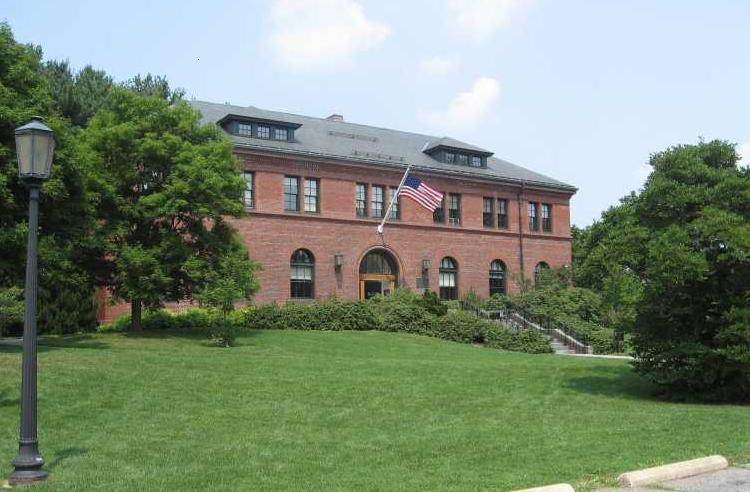
The Arnold Arboretum headquarters in Boston, Massachusetts, the Hunnewell Building named after Horatio Hollis Hunnewell, designed by Longfellow, Alden & Harlow in 1892 and completed in 1903.

=== Longfellow, Alden & Harlow ===
- Music Building at the University of Pittsburgh (1884)
- Sunnyledge (former McClelland House), 5124 Fifth Avenue in the Shadyside neighborhood of Pittsburgh, Pennsylvania (1886)
- West End United Methodist Church, 621 Main Street in the Elliott neighborhood of Pittsburgh, PA (1887)
- Duquesne Club, at 325 Sixth Avenue in downtown Pittsburgh, Pennsylvania (1887 to 1889; addition by Alden & Harlow in 1902)
- Cambridge, Massachusetts City Hall, built in 1888 and 1889
- Edwin Abbot House, Cambridge, Massachusetts (1889)
- Brattle Hall, Cambridge, Massachusetts (1889)
- First United Methodist Church, Parker Avenue at Library Street, Braddock, Pennsylvania (1889)
- Joseph Horne House, 838 Lincoln Avenue in the Allegheny West neighborhood of Pittsburgh, PA (1889)
- McKeesport National Bank, Fifth Avenue and Sinclair Street, McKeesport, Pennsylvania (1889 to 1891)
- Theodore Parker Church, West Roxbury, Massachusetts (1890)
- Frank Alden House, 617 Linden Avenue in the Point Breeze neighborhood of Pittsburgh, PA (1889)
- Carnegie Institute and Carnegie Library of Pittsburgh in the Oakland neighborhood of Pittsburgh, PA (1892 to 1895; addition to Institute by Alden & Harlow from 1903 to 1907)
- Hunnewell Building at Arnold Arboretum in Boston, Massachusetts (1892 to 1903)
- J.A. Noyes House, Cambridge, Massachusetts (1894)
- "Bagatelle" (James G. Pontefract House), Little Sewickley Creek Road, Edgeworth, Pennsylvania (1894)
- "Red Gables" (Frank Alden House), 605 Maple Lane, Edgeworth, Pennsylvania (1894)
- Carnegie Building (Pittsburgh), the first steel-framed building in Pittsburgh, PA (1895)
- Garrison Foundry-Mackintosh Hemphill Company Offices, South Side Flats, Pittsburgh, PA (1895)

=== Alden & Harlow ===
- Carnegie Library of Homestead, Munhall, Pennsylvania (1896)
- The greenhouse and playhouse at the Frick Art & Historical Center, in the Point Breeze neighborhood of Pittsburgh, PA (1897)
- Byers-Lyons House, in the Allegheny West neighborhood of Pittsburgh, PA (1898)
- Lawrenceville Branch of the Carnegie Library of Pittsburgh (1898)
- The Pittsburgh Golf Club, 5280 Northumberland Street in the Squirrel Hill neighborhood of Pittsburgh, PA (1899, enlarged 1904)
- Carnegie Library of Steubenville, 407 S. 4th Street, Steubenville, Ohio (1899) Renovated (2018) Main Library, Public Library of Steubenville and Jefferson County
- Mount Washington Branch of the Carnegie Library of Pittsburgh (1900)
- Oakmont Carnegie Library, Allegheny River Boulevard, Oakmont, Pennsylvania (1901)
- The Bank Tower (Peoples Savings Bank Building), at 307 Fourth Avenue in downtown Pittsburgh, Pennsylvania (1901 and 1902)
- Western Pennsylvania School for the Deaf Administrative Building, Swissvale Avenue and Walnut Street in Edgewood, Pennsylvania (1903)
- Bellefield Boiler Plant ("Cloud Factory"), built to provide steam for the Carnegie Institute, Pittsburgh, PA (1903 to 1907)
- "Muottas" (William Walker House), Little Sewickley Creek Road, Edgeworth, Pennsylvania (1904)
- Regal Shoe Company, at the corner of Market Street and Fifth Avenue (160 Fifth Avenue), downtown Pittsburgh, Pennsylvania (1908)
- South Side Branch of the Carnegie Library of Pittsburgh (1909)
- Homewood Branch of the Carnegie Library of Pittsburgh (1910)
- Mellon Park gardens in the Point Breeze neighborhood of Pittsburgh, PA (1912)
- Fox Chapel Golf Club, 426 Fox Chapel Road in Fox Chapel, Pennsylvania (1924 and 1925)

== Longfellow, Alden & Harlow gallery ==
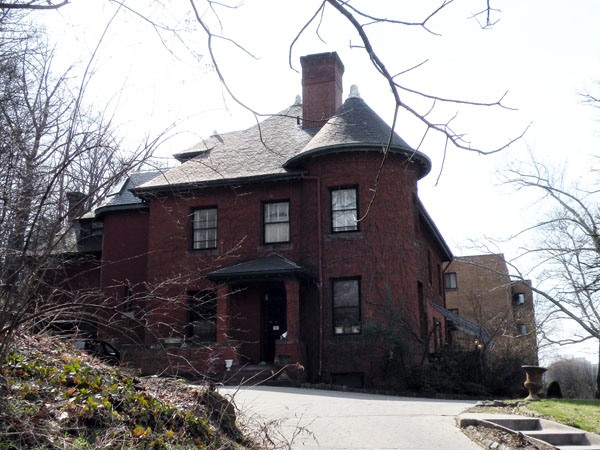
Sunnyledge, built in 1886, in the Shadyside neighborhood of Pittsburgh, Pennsylvania.

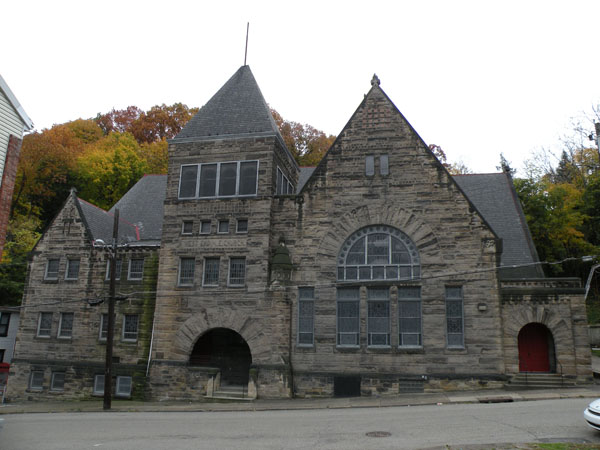
West End United Methodist Church, built in 1887, in the Elliott neighborhood of Pittsburgh, Pennsylvania.

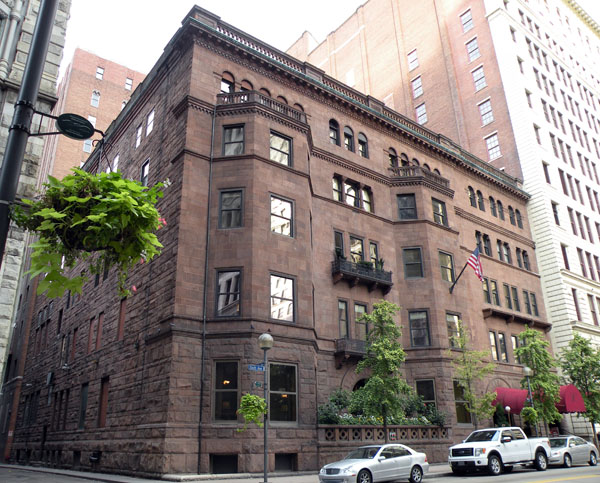
Duquesne Club, built from 1887 to 1889, in downtown Pittsburgh, Pennsylvania (with an addition by Alden & Harlow in 1902).

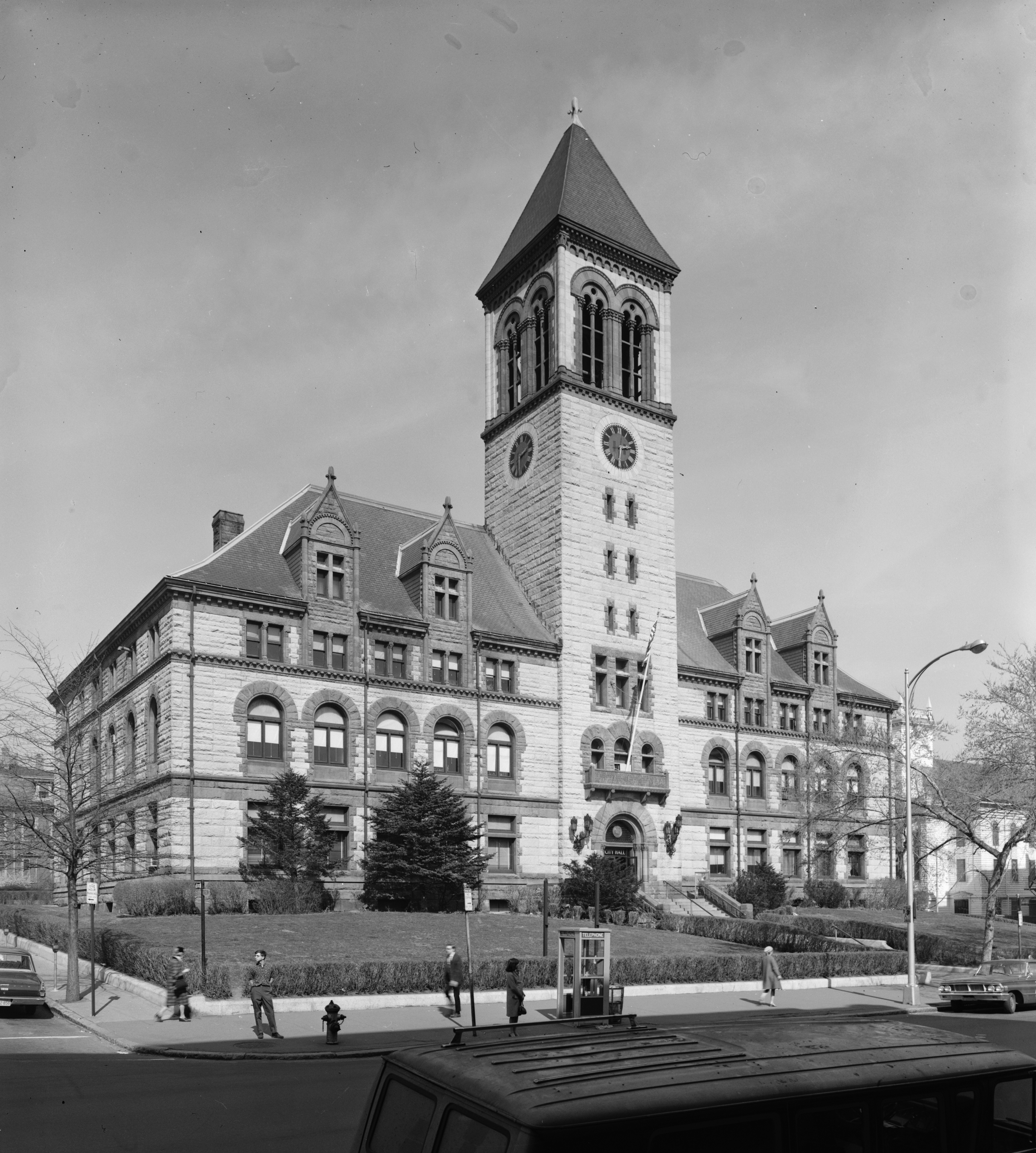
Cambridge, Massachusetts City Hall, built in 1888 and 1889.

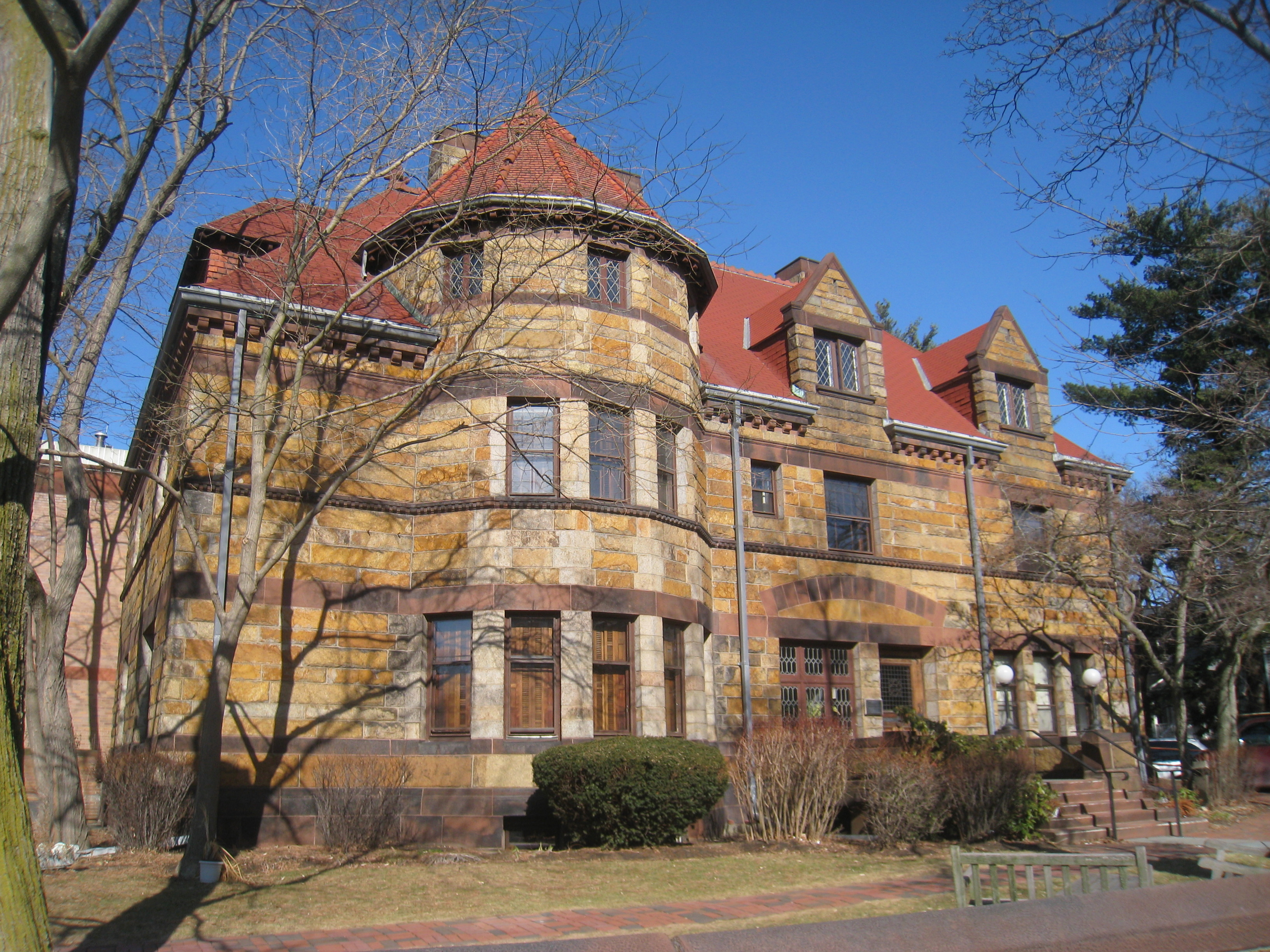
Edwin Abbot House, built in 1889, in Cambridge, Massachusetts.

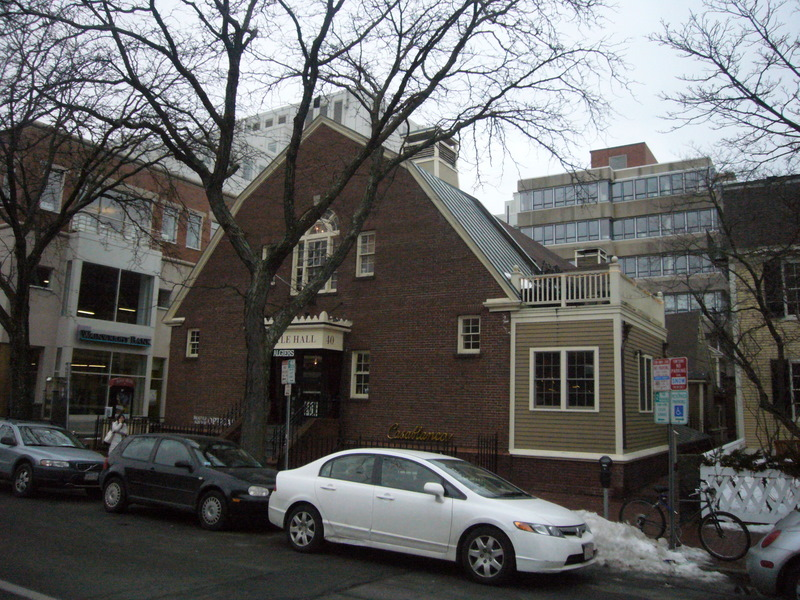
Brattle Hall, built in 1889, in Cambridge, Massachusetts.

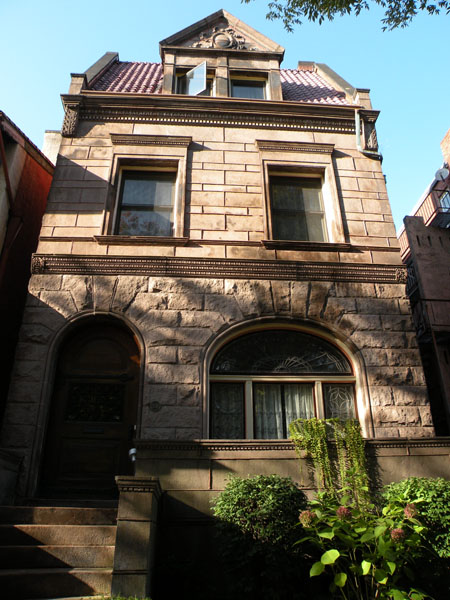
Joseph Horne House, built in 1889, in the Allegheny West neighborhood of Pittsburgh, Pennsylvania.

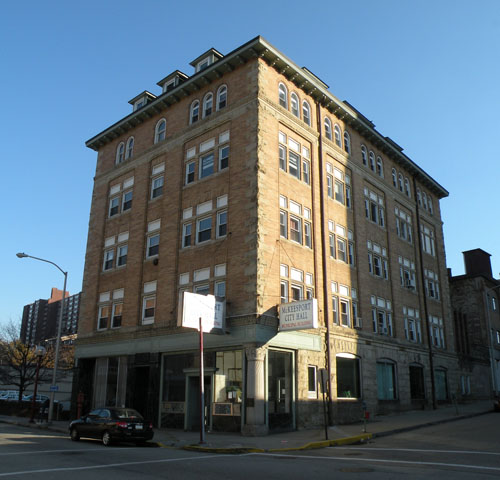
McKeesport National Bank (now McKeesport City Hall), built from 1889 to 1891, in McKeesport, Pennsylvania.

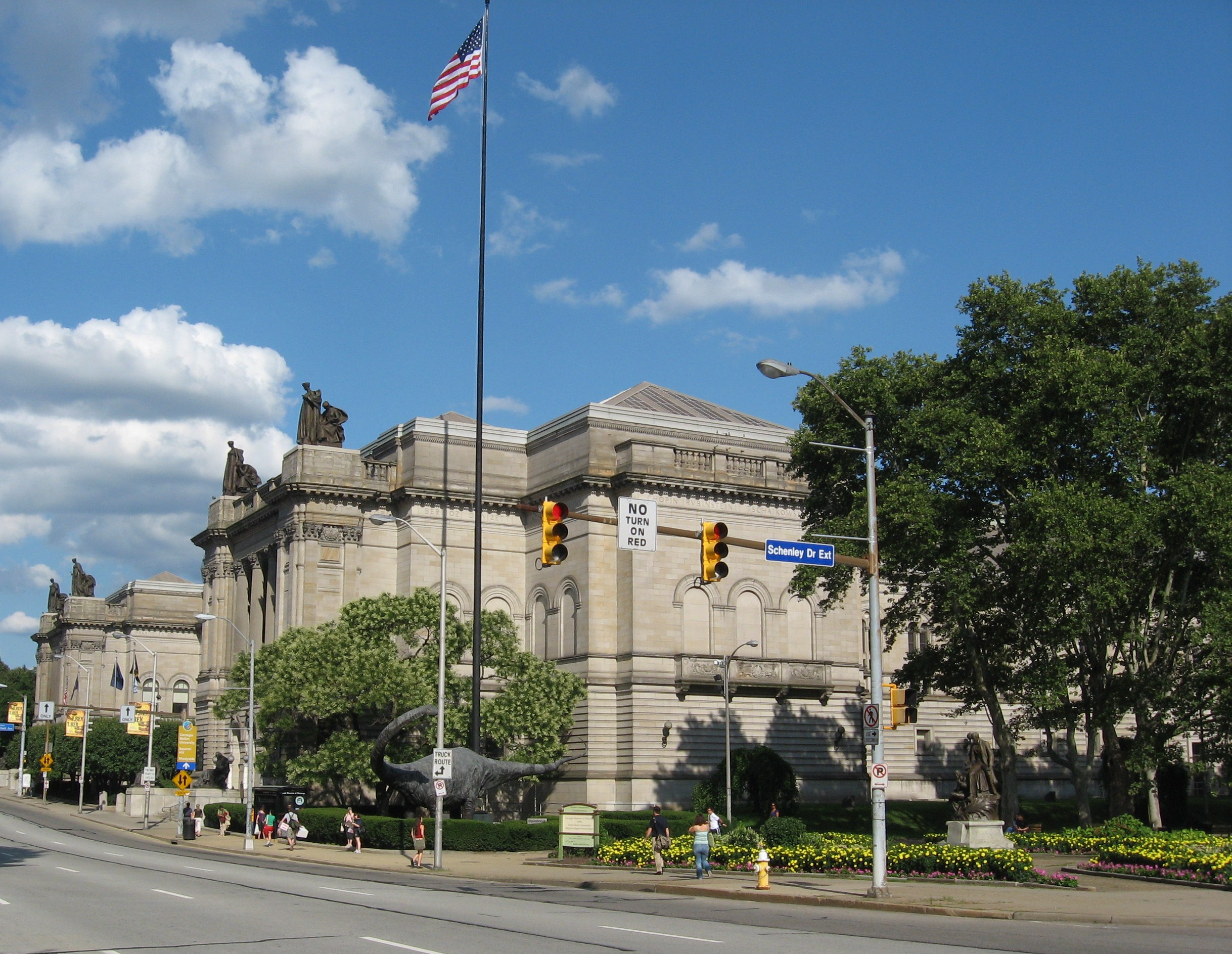
Carnegie Institute, 1892 to 1895, original building, as well as an addition from 1903 to 1907, in the Oakland neighborhood of Pittsburgh, Pennsylvania.

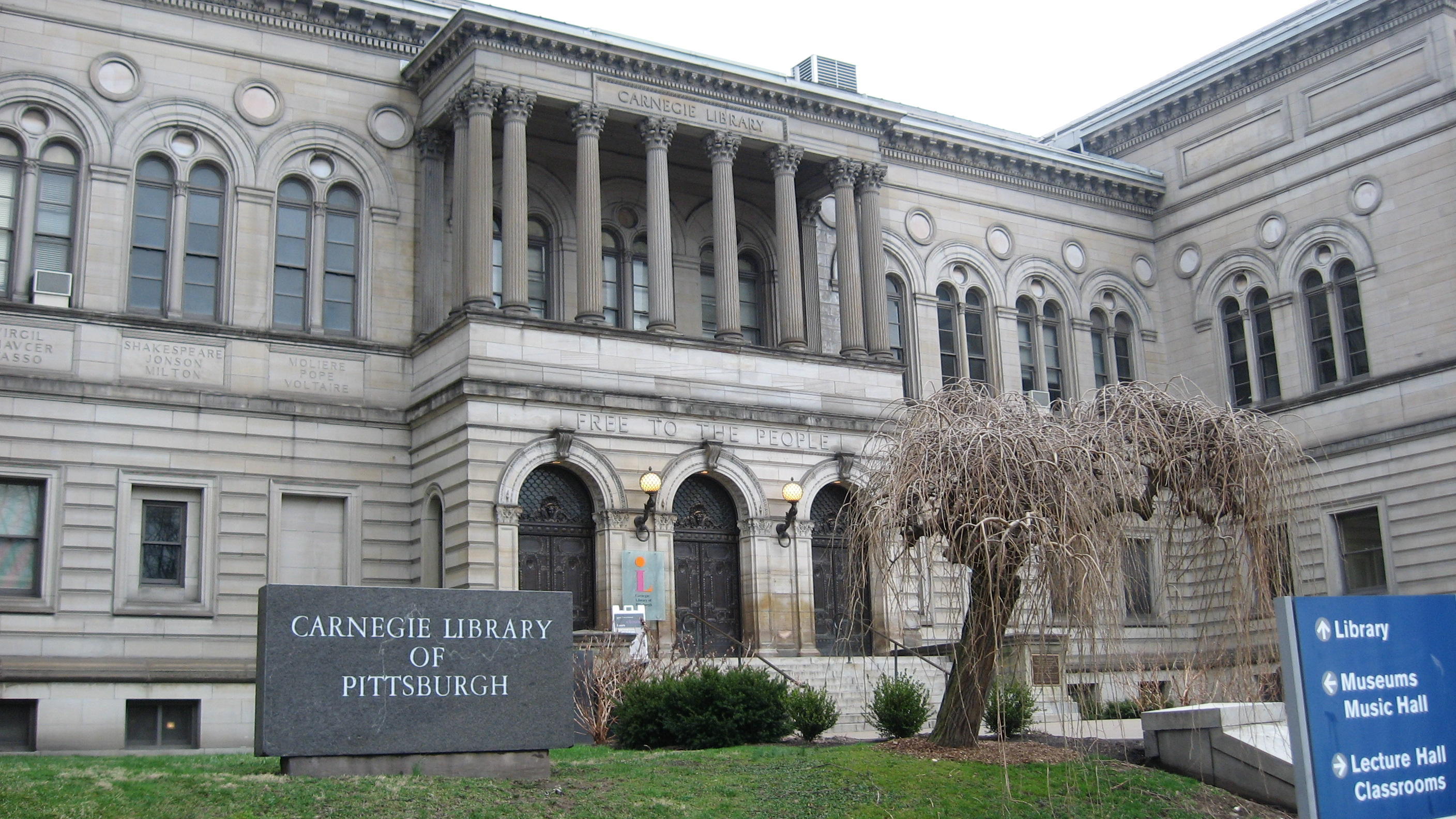
Carnegie Library of Pittsburgh, 1892 to 1895.

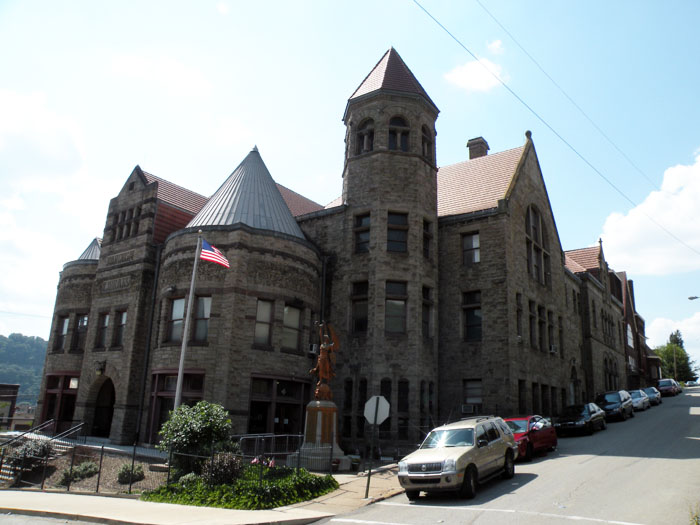
Carnegie Free Library of Braddock in Braddock, Pennsylvania, built in 1888 and designed by William Halsey Wood. The 1893 addition by Longfellow, Alden & Harlow is to the right of and including the octagonal tower.

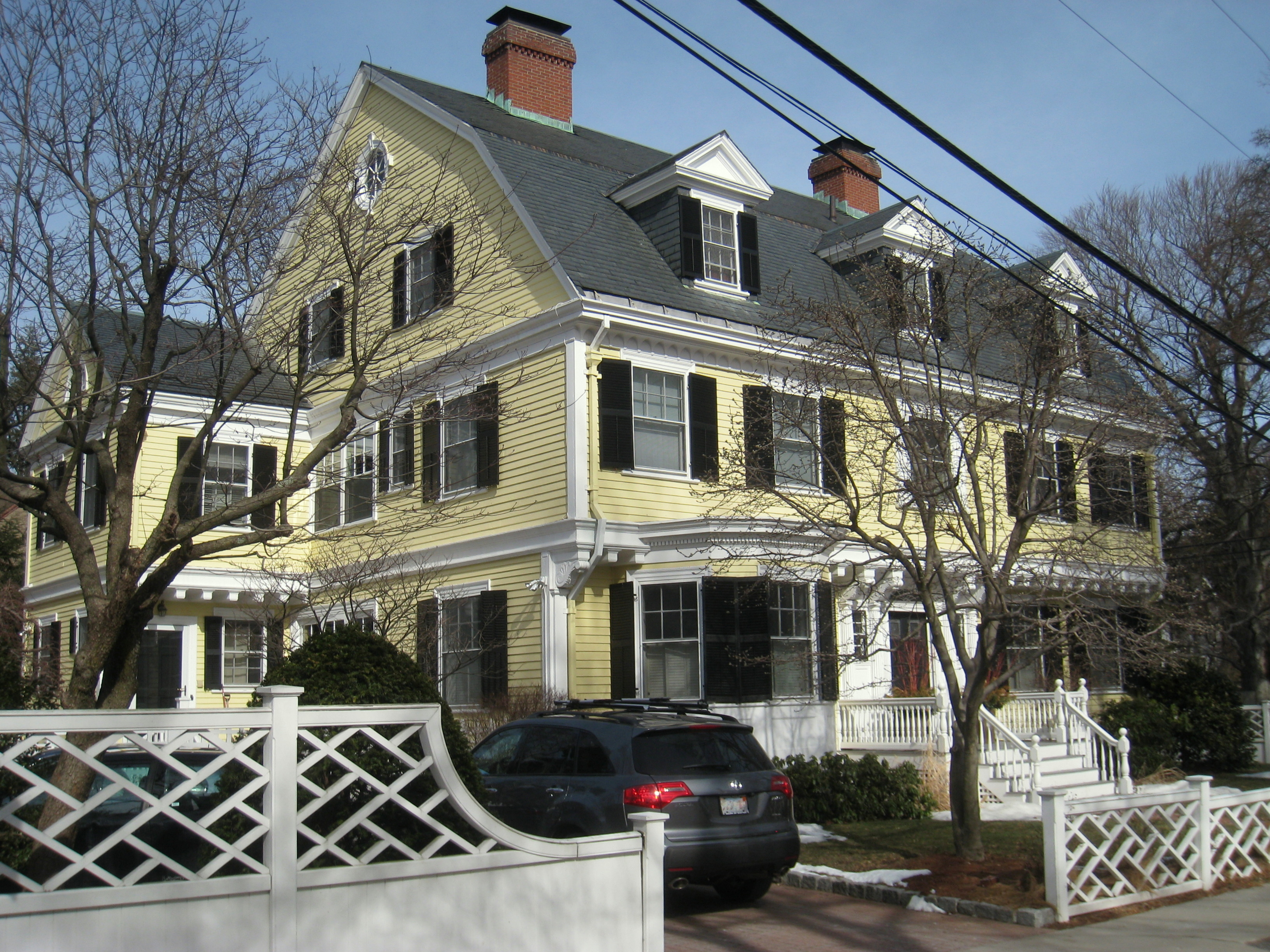
J.A. Noyes House, built in 1894, in Cambridge, Massachusetts.

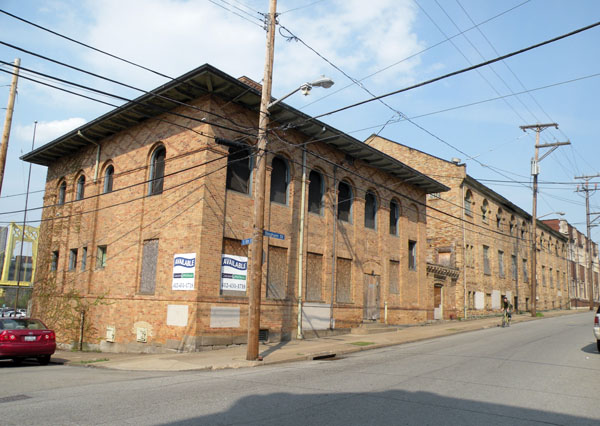
Garrison Foundry-Mackintosh Hemphill Company Offices, built in 1895, in the South Side Flats neighborhood of Pittsburgh, Pennsylvania.

== Alden & Harlow gallery ==
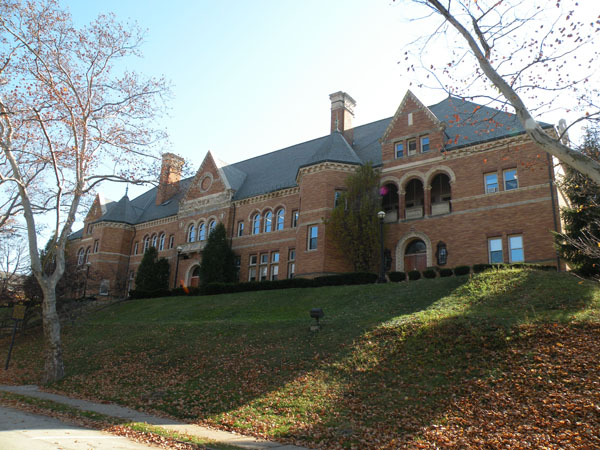
Carnegie Library of Homestead, built in 1896, in Munhall, Pennsylvania.

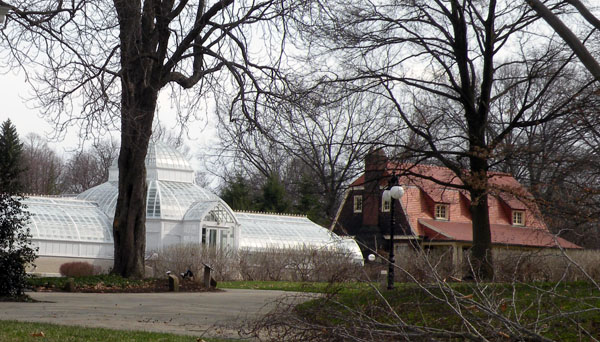
The greenhouse and playhouse at the Frick Art & Historical Center, built in 1897, in the Point Breeze neighborhood of Pittsburgh, Pennsylvania.

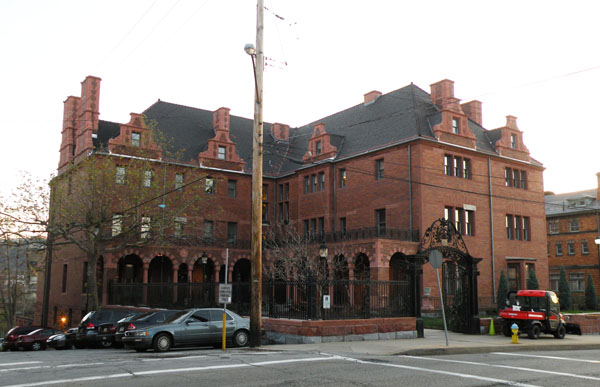
Byers-Lyons House, built in 1898, in the Allegheny West neighborhood of Pittsburgh, Pennsylvania.

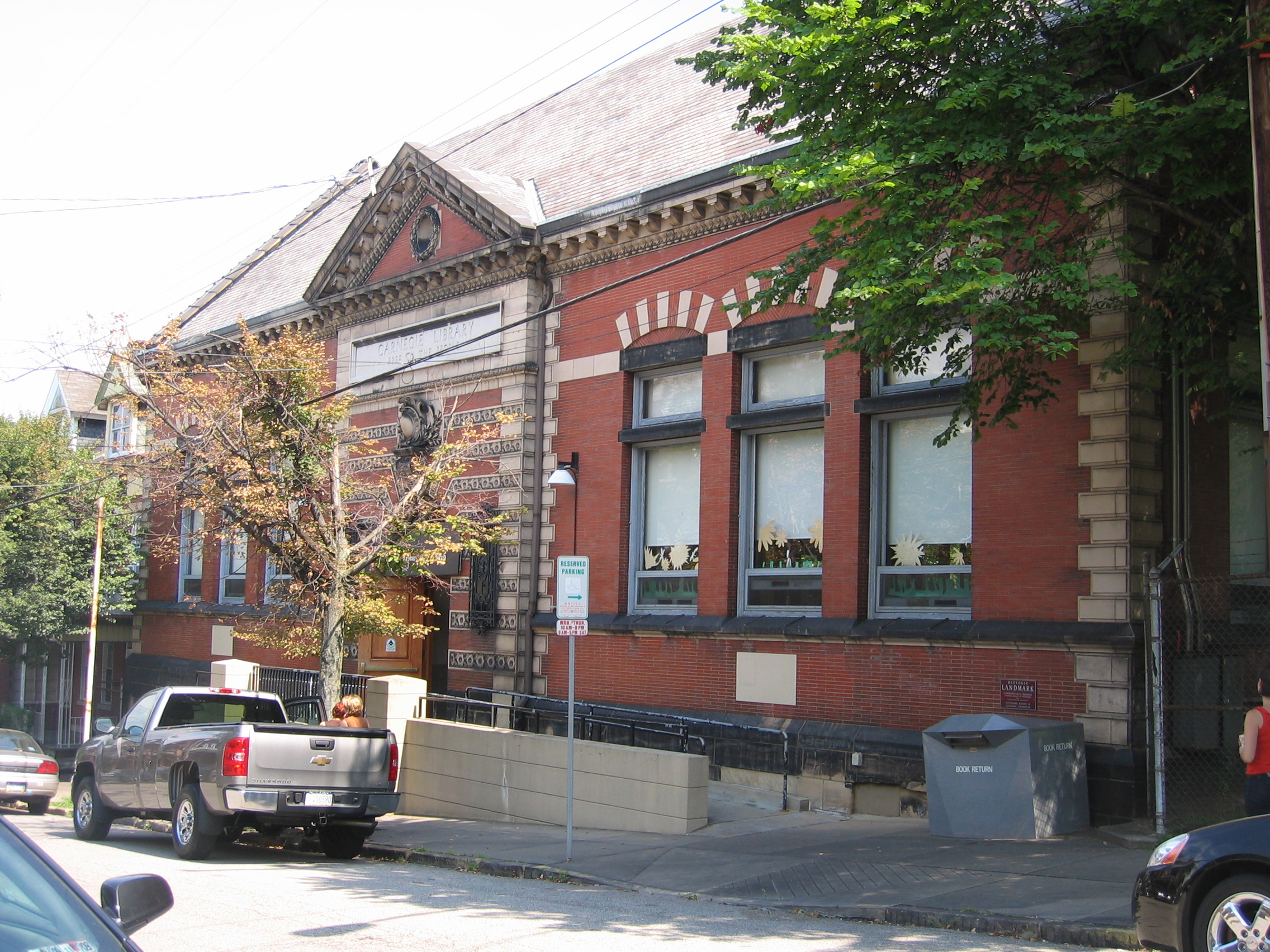
Lawrenceville Branch of the Carnegie Library of Pittsburgh, built in 1898.

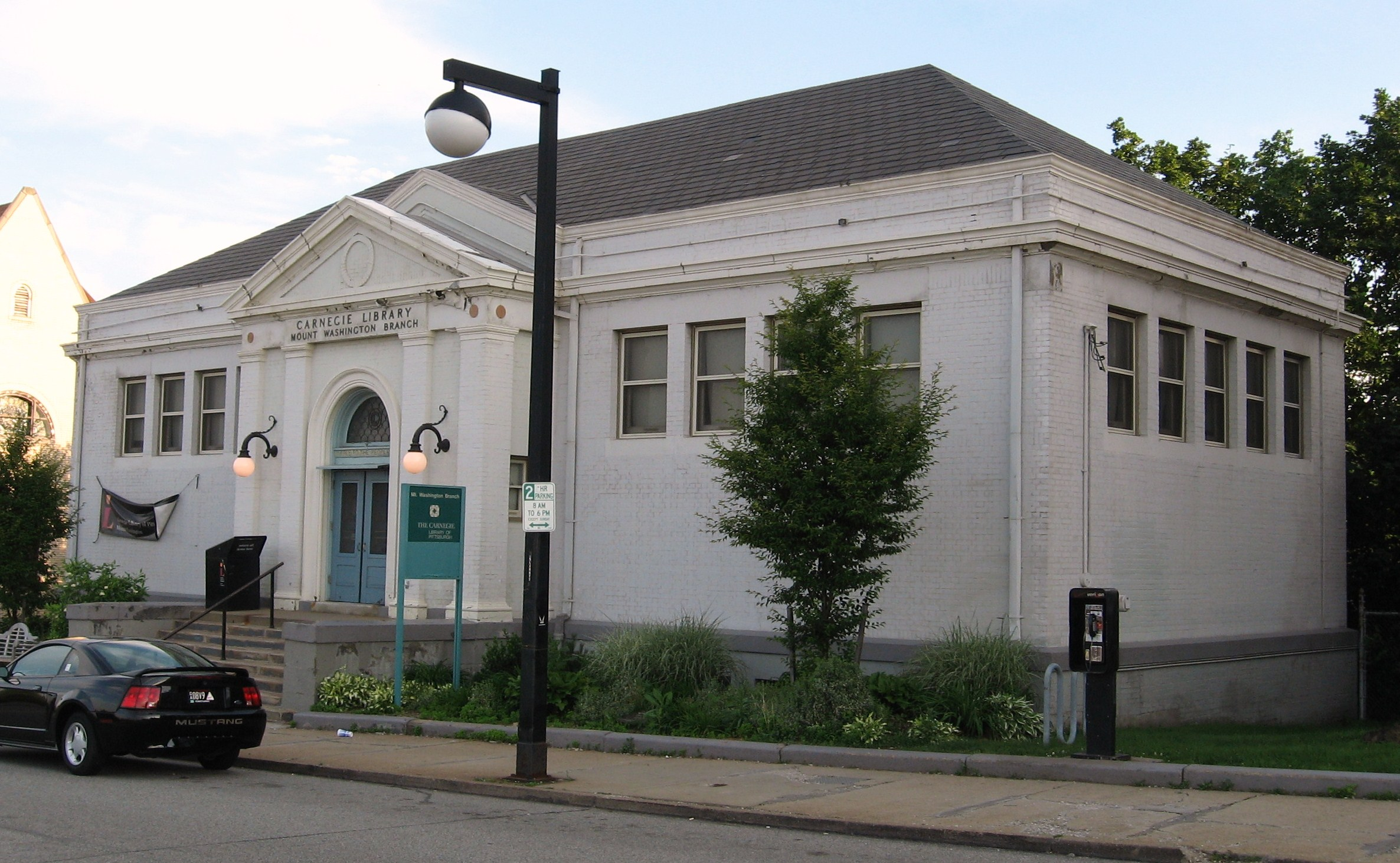
Mount Washington Branch of the Carnegie Library of Pittsburgh, built in 1900.

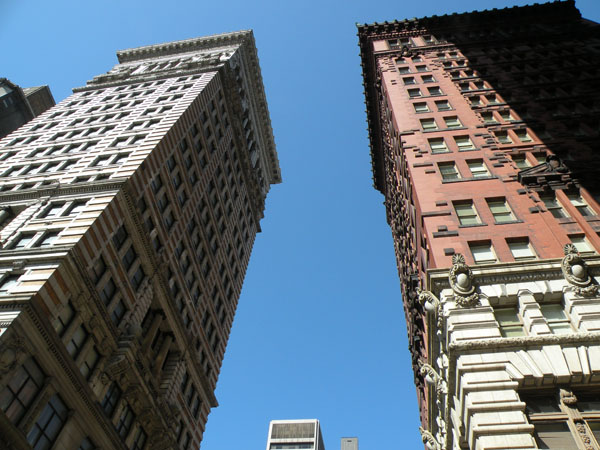
The Bank Tower (on the right), built in 1901 and 1902, at 307 Fourth Avenue in downtown Pittsburgh, Pennsylvania.

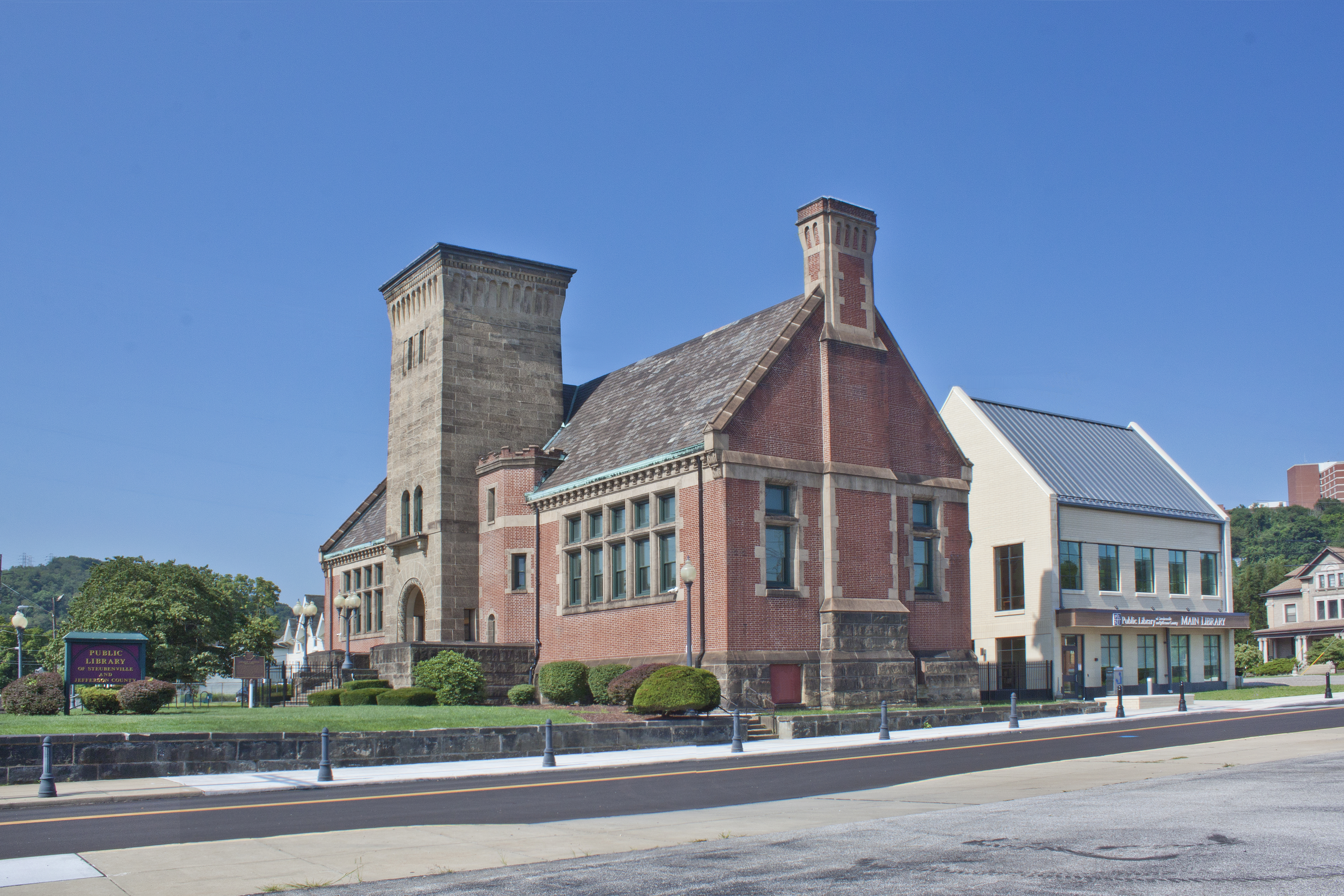
Main Library, Public Library of Steubenville and Jefferson County Ohio, First Carnegie Library approved for Ohio, June 30, 1899, Opened March 12, 1902.

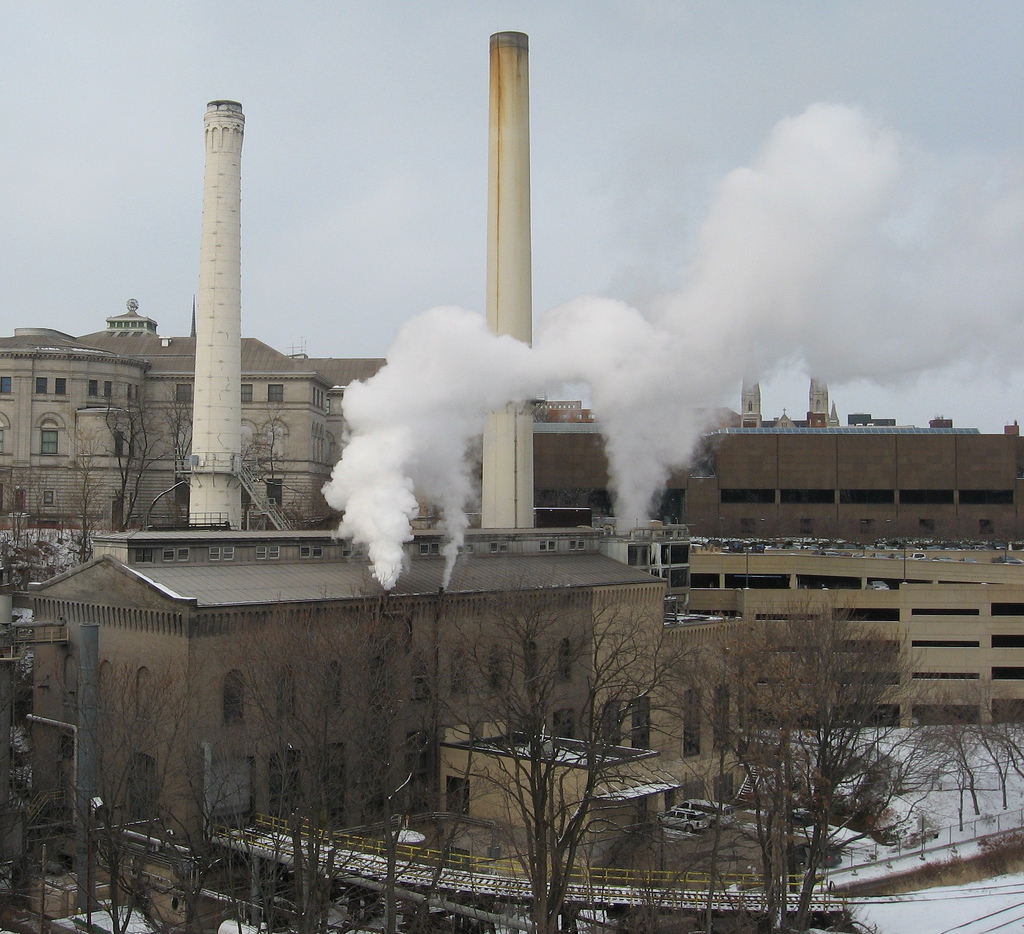
Cloud Factory, built from 1903 to 1907, in the Oakland district of Pittsburgh, Pennsylvania.

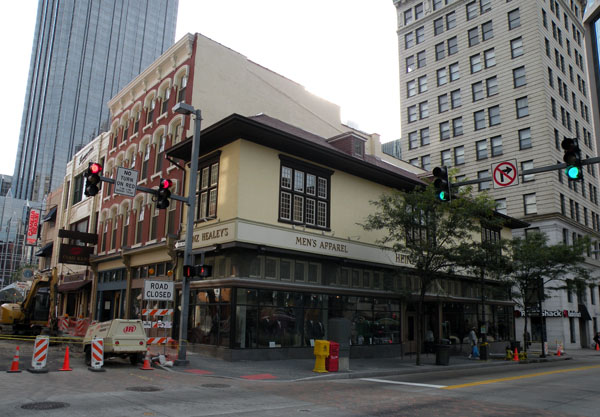
Regal Shoe Company, part of Market at Fifth by Market Square in downtown Pittsburgh, Pennsylvania, built in 1908.

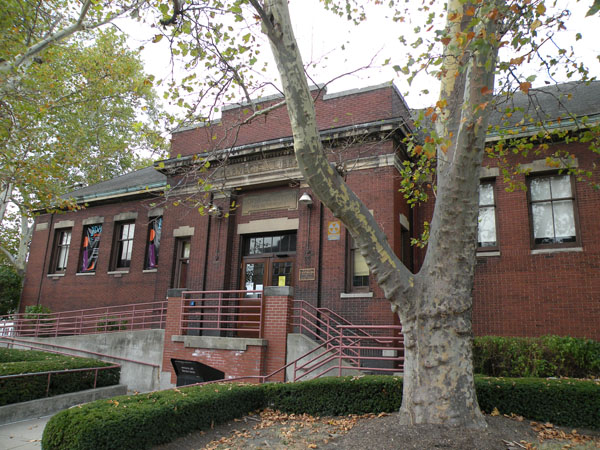
South Side Branch of the Carnegie Library of Pittsburgh, built in 1909.

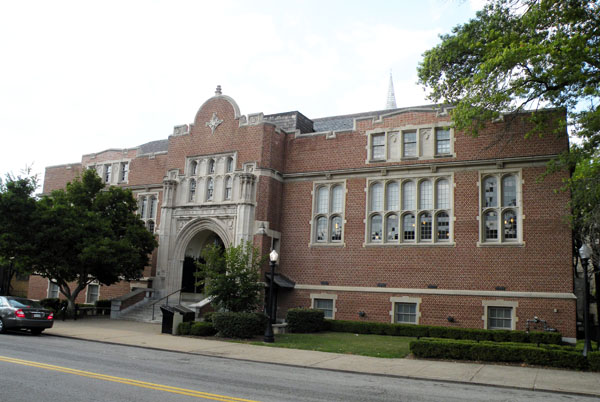
Homewood Branch of the Carnegie Library of Pittsburgh, built in 1910.

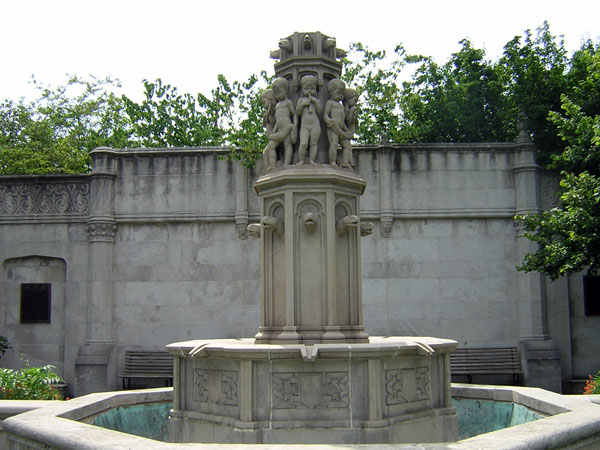
Mellon Park, gardens designed in 1912, in the Point Breeze neighborhood of Pittsburgh, Pennsylvania.
