= Carnegie Building (Pittsburgh) =

Demolished building in Pittsburgh from the 19th century-1952

Coordinates: 40.4395°N 79.9976°W

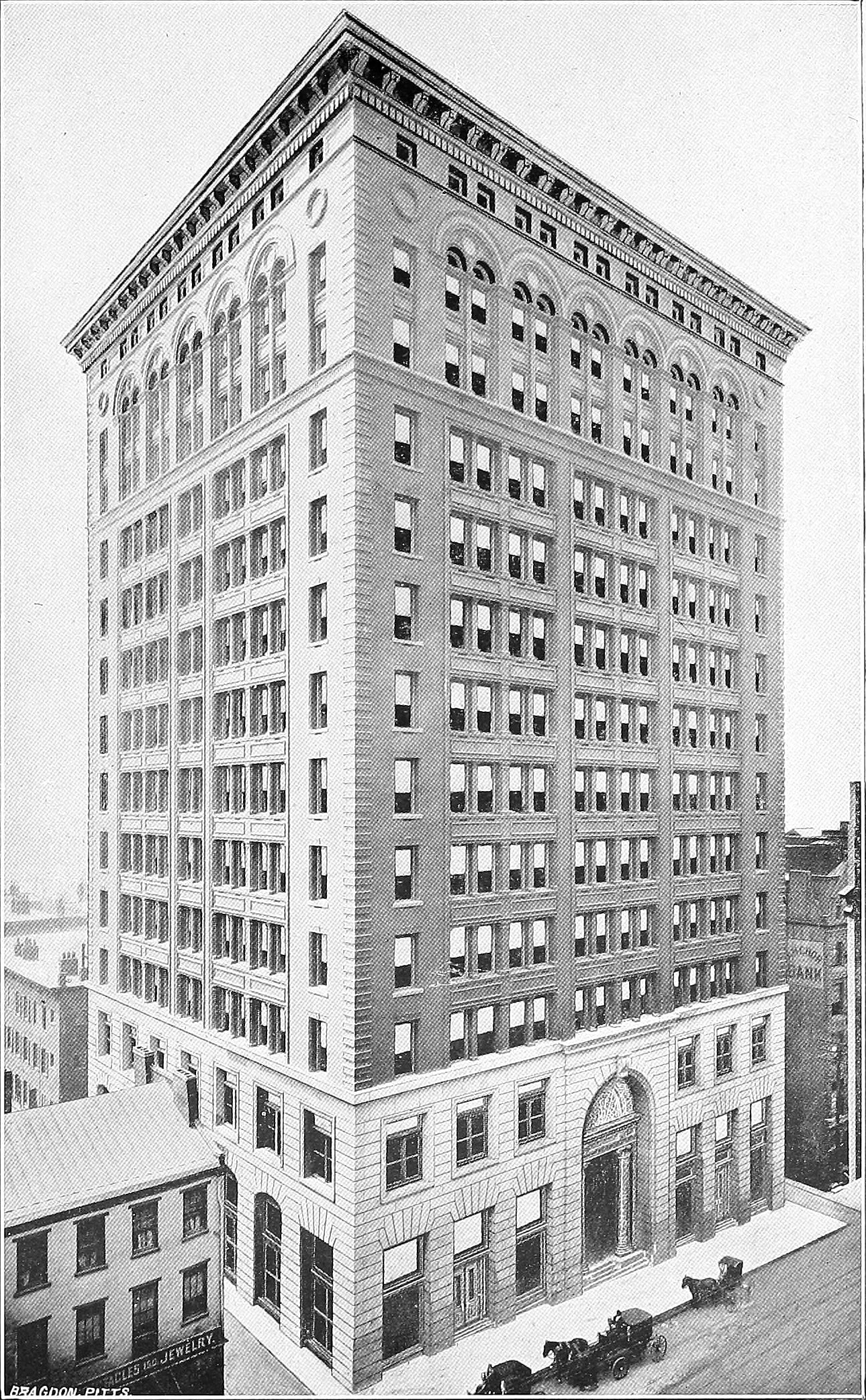
- View of the Carnegie Building in 1905 by photographer John C. Bragdon
- Interactive map of the Carnegie Building (Pittsburgh) area

General information
- Location: Pittsburgh, Pennsylvania
- Construction started: 1893
- Construction stopped: 1895
- Opened: 1895
- Demolished: 1952

Design and construction
- Architect: Longfellow, Alden & Harlow

The Carnegie Building, also known as the Carnegie Steel Building, was a high-rise building in Pittsburgh, Pennsylvania.

== History ==
The structure started construction in 1893 and was completed in 1895 as the city's tallest at the time. It was the first steel-framed skyscraper in Pittsburgh upon completion. The building served as the world headquarters of Carnegie Steel Company, a steel producing company of the late 19th century created by industrialist and philanthropist Andrew Carnegie to manage steel mills in the city, and later to become U.S. Steel. The building was a Downtown Pittsburgh landmark and was located at 428-438 Fifth Avenue. It was torn down in 1952 for an expansion of Kaufmann's flagship store.

== Height and design ==
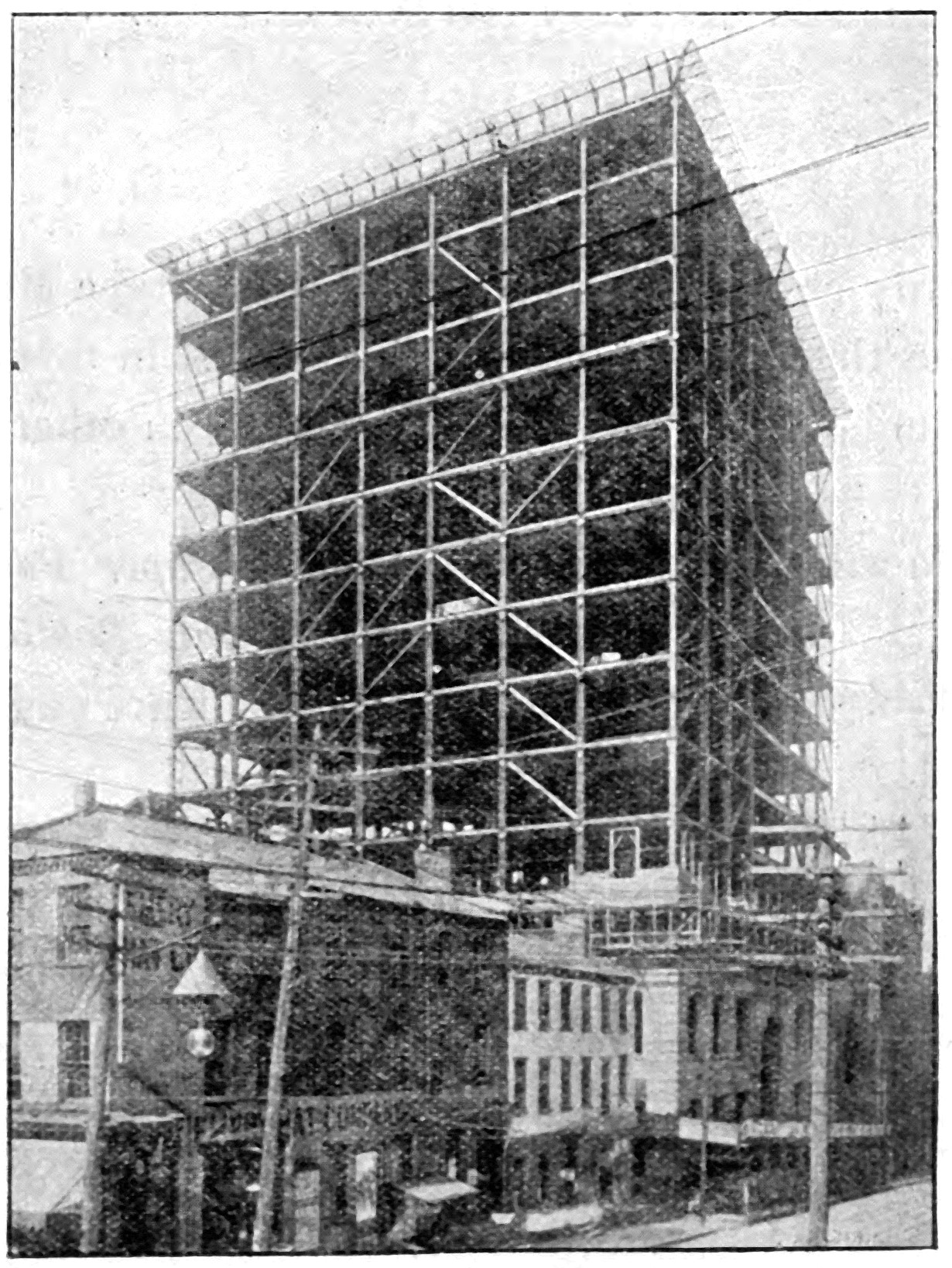
The Carnegie Building under construction, showing steel skeleton

The Carnegie Building was an early example of Chicago school architecture in Pittsburgh, and was designed by the architectural firm Longfellow, Alden & Harlow. It rose 13 floors in height, and stood as the first steel-framed skyscraper in Pittsburgh and one of the first steel-cage structured buildings in the world.

== See also ==
- List of tallest buildings in Pittsburgh
