= Garrison Foundry-Mackintosh Hemphill Company Offices =

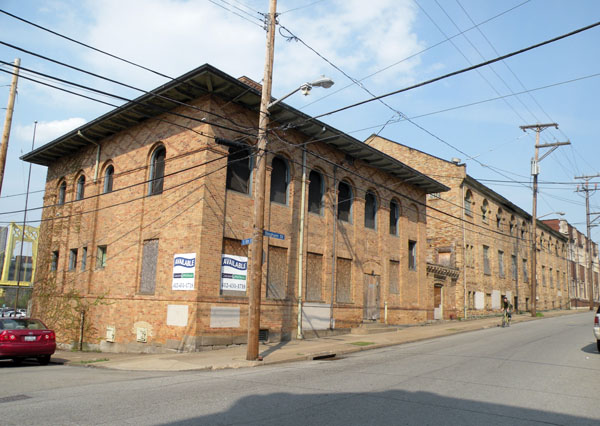

- Location within Pittsburgh
- 40°25′46.33″N 79°59′22.66″W
- Location: 901-911 Bingham Street (South Side Flats), Pittsburgh, Pennsylvania, USA

History
- Built: 1895 to 1902

Garrison Foundry-Mackintosh Hemphill Company Offices located at 901-911 Bingham Street in the South Side Flats neighborhood of Pittsburgh, Pennsylvania, were built from 1895 to 1902. This Greek Revival styled building was the first building built on the former St. Mary's Parish Complex. These yellow brick buildings were part of the A. Garrison Foundry Co., later the Mackintosh-Hemphill Co., which produced basic iron and steel equipment from the 1870s to the 1980s. The plant equipped dozens of mills in the United States and abroad, including U.S. Steel's Homestead Works, which was conceived, designed, constructed and equipped by James Hemphill. At least one of the Mackintosh-Hemphill buildings (the building on the corner) is attributed to Longfellow, Alden & Harlow. The foundry was added to the List of City of Pittsburgh historic designations on December 30, 2008.
