= Brattle Hall =

- U.S. National Register of Historic Places
- U.S. Historic district – Contributing property
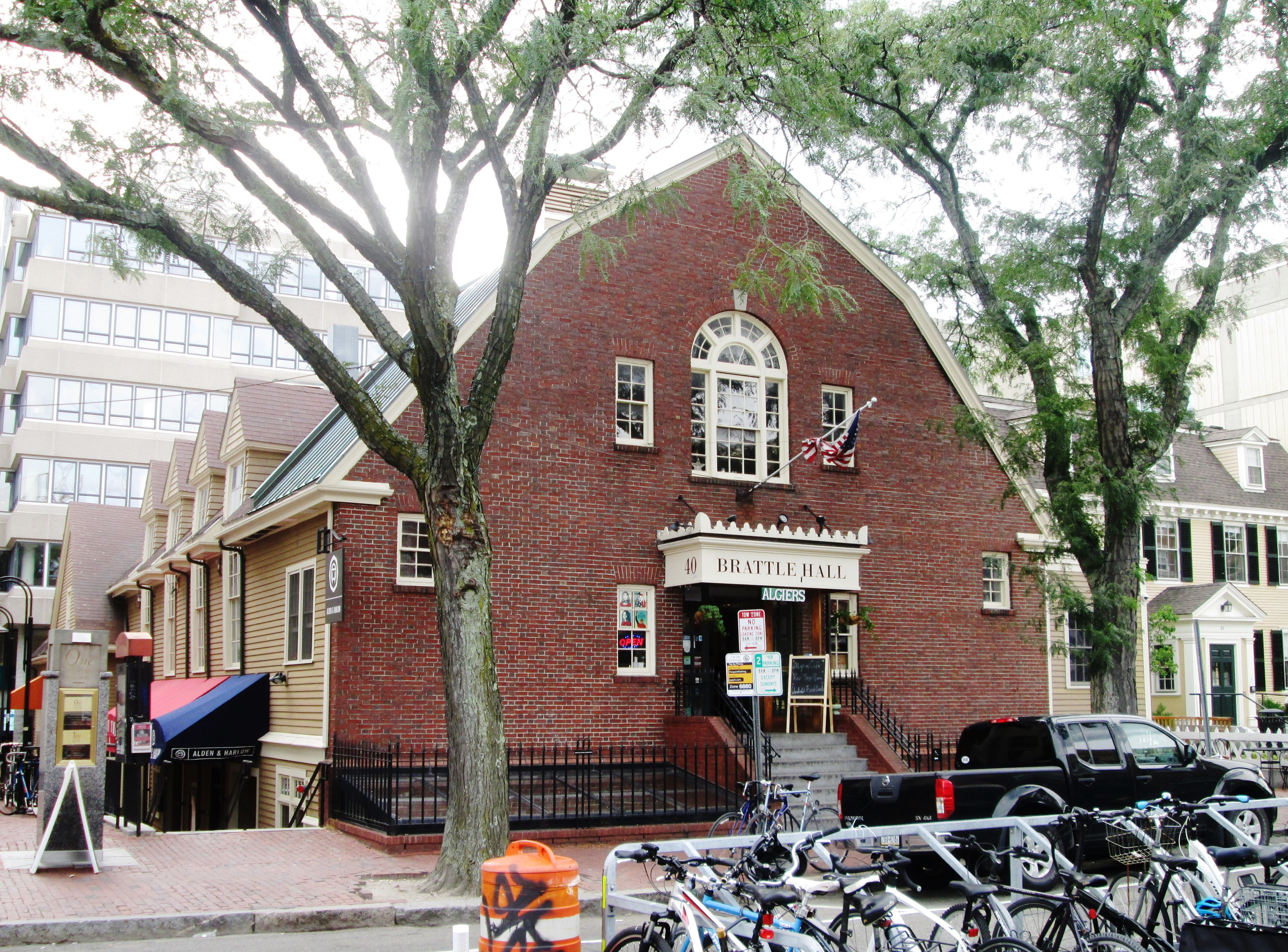
- (2017)

- Location within Massachusetts
- Location: 40 Brattle Street, Cambridge, Massachusetts
- Coordinates: 42°22′24.7″N 71°7′17.5″W
- Built: 1889, 1907
- Architect: Longfellow, Alden & Harlow; Charles Cogswell
- Architectural style: Colonial Revival
- Part of: Harvard Square Historic District (ID86003654)
- MPS: Cambridge MRA
- NRHP reference No.: 82001925

Significant dates
- Added to NRHP: April 13, 1982
- Designated CP: July 28, 1988

Brattle Hall is a historic building along Brattle Street near Harvard Square in Cambridge, Massachusetts. It was constructed in 1889 for the Cambridge Social Union – established in 1871 – when that organization moved into the adjacent William Brattle House that year. Brattle Hall was built to house the organization's library, and to provide a space for larger meetings and social functions. Brattle Hall was designed by Longfellow, Alden & Harlow, originally in the Dutch Colonial Revival style, but it acquired more of a Colonial Revival feel with the 1907 addition of brick ends, designed by Charles Cogswell.

The building continues to serve as a social center today. It houses the Brattle Theatre, a repertory movie house operated by a local non-profit since 1953, a restaurant in its basement, and a coffee shop on its first level.

The building was listed on the National Register of Historic Places in 1982, and included in an expansion of the Harvard Square Historic District in 1988.

== See also ==
- National Register of Historic Places listings in Cambridge, Massachusetts
