= J.A. Noyes House =

Historic house in Massachusetts, United States

- U.S. National Register of Historic Places
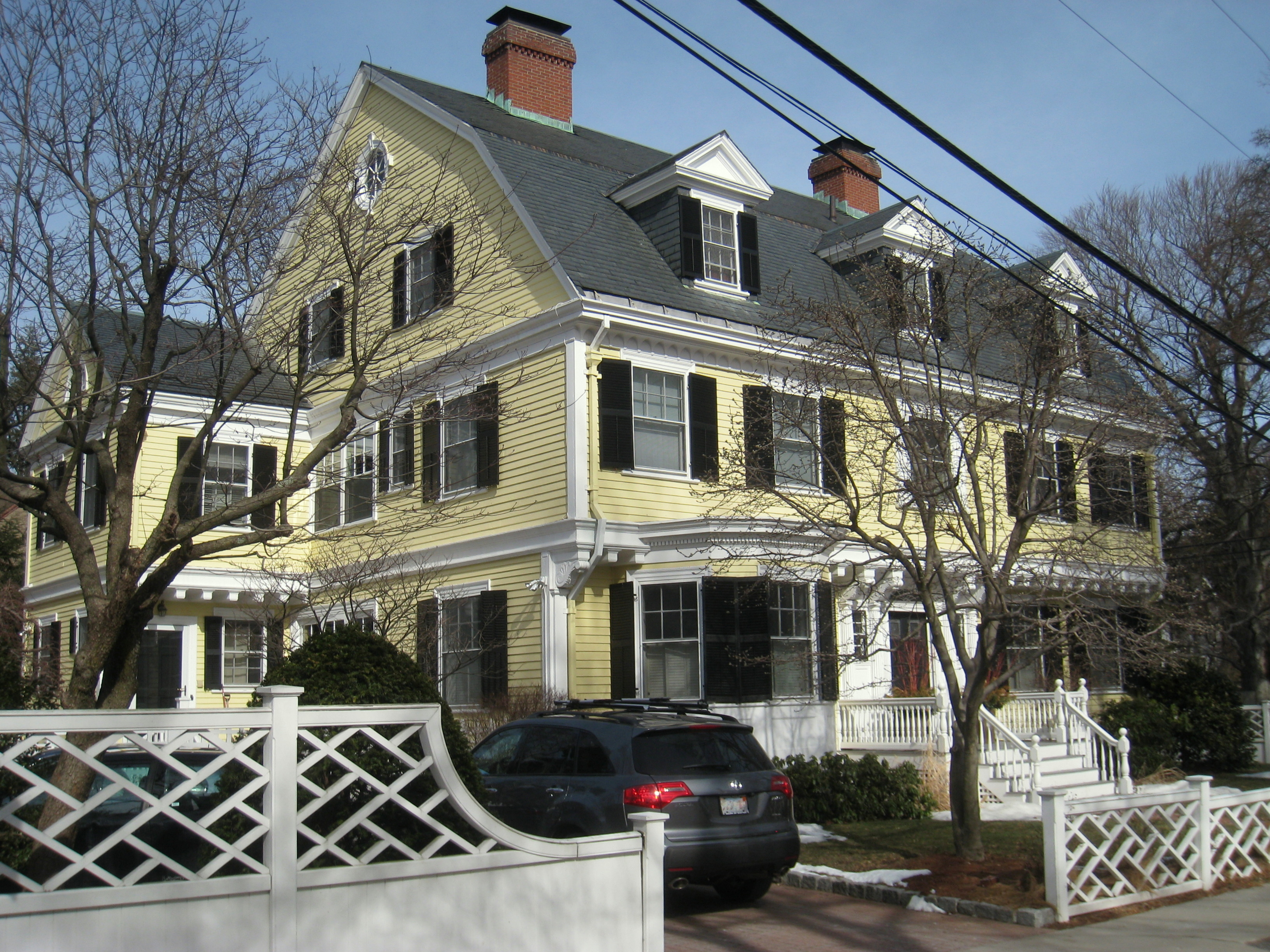

- Location within Massachusetts Location within the United States
- Location: Cambridge, Massachusetts
- Coordinates: 42°22′46.8″N 71°07′54.0″W
- Built: 1894
- Architect: Longfellow, Alden & Harlow; Eliot, Charles
- Architectural style: Colonial Revival
- MPS: Cambridge MRA
- NRHP reference No.: 82001965
- Added to NRHP: April 13, 1982

The J.A. Noyes House is an historic house at 1 Highland Street in Cambridge, Massachusetts. It is a three-story wood-frame structure, five bays wide with a gambrel roof and clapboard siding. The second floor hangs slightly over the first floor in a reminder of the early colonial garrison style. The main entrance is flanked by short sidelight windows and topped by a narrow semi-oval fanlight. A rounded bay projects to the left of the entrance, and gabled dormers pierce the roof. The house was built in 1894 to design by Longfellow, Alden & Harlow and is a well-kept example of Colonial Revival architecture; the yard was originally landscaped by Charles Eliot. The house is significant in part for the survival of its construction documentation.

The house was listed on the National Register of Historic Places in 1982.

== See also ==
- National Register of Historic Places listings in Cambridge, Massachusetts
