= McKeesport National Bank =

- U.S. National Register of Historic Places
- Pittsburgh Landmark – PHLF
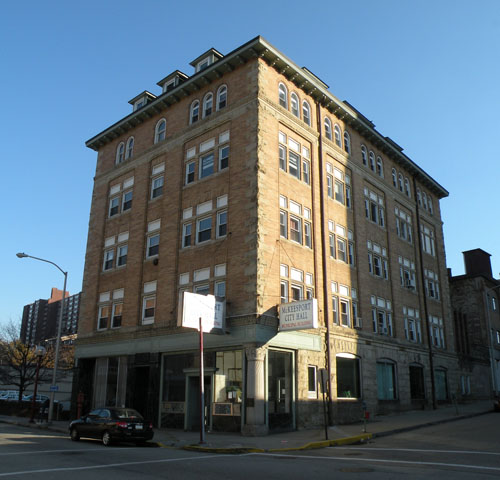

- Location within Pennsylvania Location within the United States
- Location: 5th Avenue and Sinclair Street, McKeesport, Pennsylvania, USA
- Coordinates: 40°21′3.83″N 79°51′42.84″W
- Built: 1889 to 1891
- Architect: Longfellow, Alden & Harlow, Daniel Stratton
- Architectural style: Romanesque Revival, Other, Late 19th And 20th Century Revivals
- NRHP reference No.: 80003403

Significant dates
- Added to NRHP: August 29, 1980
- Designated PHLF: 1981

McKeesport National Bank (now McKeesport City Hall) located at 5th Avenue and Sinclair Street in McKeesport, Pennsylvania, was built from 1889 to 1891. It was added to the National Register of Historic Places on August 29, 1980, and the List of Pittsburgh History and Landmarks Foundation Historic Landmarks in 1981.
