= Lawrenceville Branch of the Carnegie Library of Pittsburgh =

- U.S. Historic district – Contributing property
- Pittsburgh Historic Designation
- Pittsburgh Landmark – PHLF
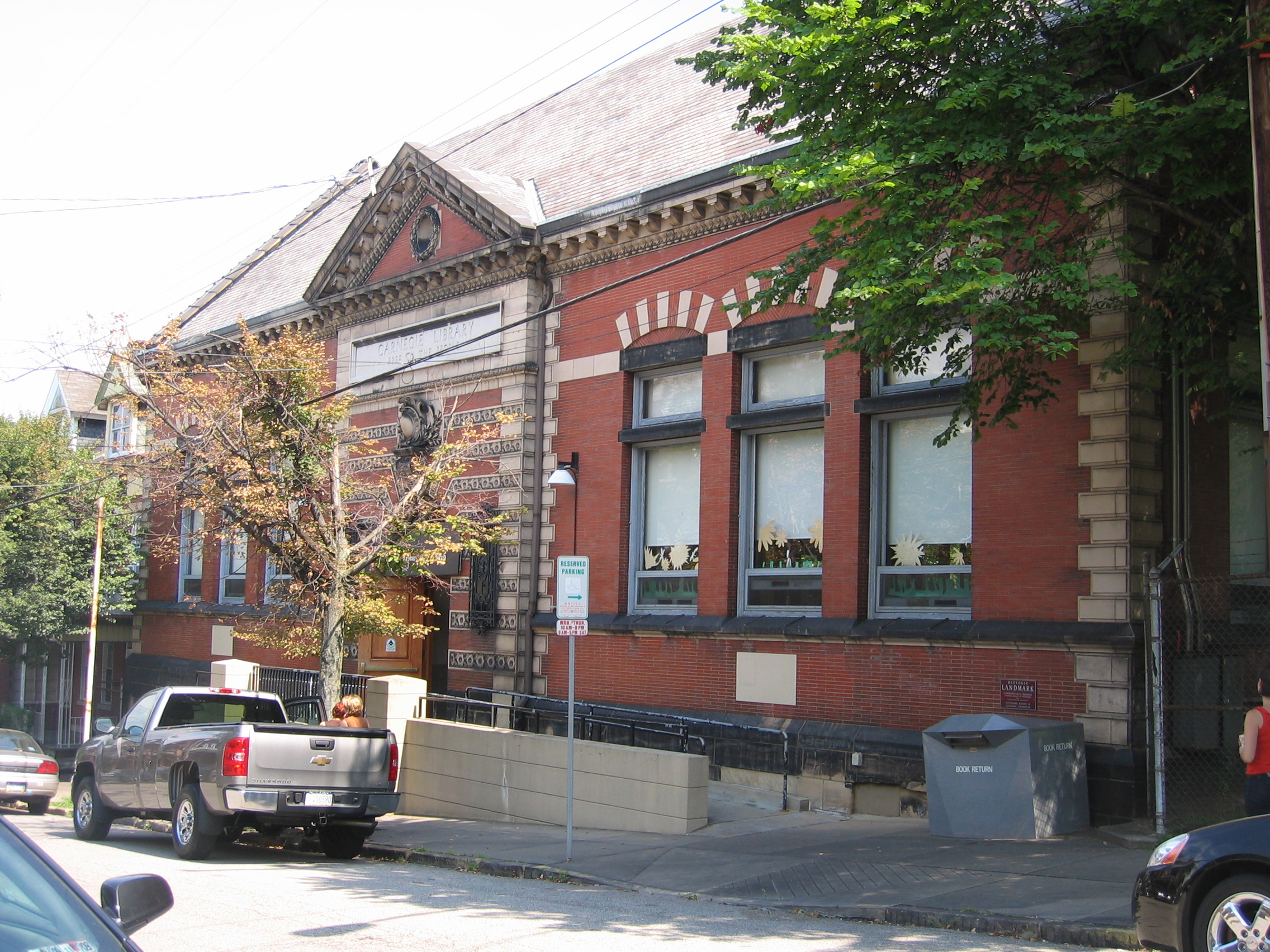
- The library in 2009

- Location within Pittsburgh
- Location: 279 Fisk St. Pittsburgh, Pennsylvania
- Coordinates: 40°28′3.07″N 79°57′33.32″W
- Built: 1898
- Architect: Alden & Harlow
- Part of: Lawrenceville Historic District (ID100004020)

Significant dates
- Designated CP: July 8, 2019
- Designated CPHD: July 28, 2004
- Designated PHLF: 1988

The Lawrenceville Branch of the Carnegie Library of Pittsburgh, which is located at 279 Fisk Street in the Lawrenceville neighborhood of Pittsburgh, Pennsylvania, opened on May 10, 1898.

Designed by the architectural firm Alden & Harlow, it was added to the List of City of Pittsburgh historic designations on July 28, 2004, and the List of Pittsburgh History and Landmarks Foundation Historic Landmarks in 1988.

== History and architecture ==
Originally commissioned as part of Andrew Carnegie's first grant to Pittsburgh, this historic library was the second library in the Pittsburgh city system to open, following the Main Branch.

It was also the sixth Carnegie funded library to open in America and the very first to have the new revolutionary policy of open or self-service shelves. The first five libraries to open in America, as well as the seventh, Carnegie Library of Homestead, which opened six months after Lawrenceville, were originally closed stack libraries where a clerk was needed to fetch books for the patrons. The eighth to open in America, the West End Branch of the Carnegie Library of Pittsburgh, opened January 31, 1899, would also have open stacks.

The Lawrenceville Branch was also the first library to have a dedicated Children's room. It was designed by the architectural firm Alden & Harlow, and it was added to the List of City of Pittsburgh historic designations on July 28, 2004, and the List of Pittsburgh History and Landmarks Foundation Historic Landmarks in 1988.

The land on which the library stands was donated by the local school board from the grounds of the Foster School. This property was originally a cemetery dating to the early days of Lawrenceville, and a historic gravestone thought to have been uncovered during construction is kept in the library.
