= Homewood Branch of the Carnegie Library of Pittsburgh =

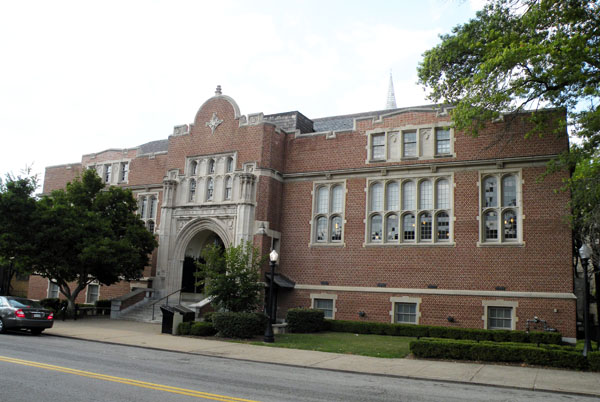

- Location within Pittsburgh
- 40°27′18.84″N 79°53′57.17″W
- Location: 7101 Hamilton Avenue (Homewood South), Pittsburgh, Pennsylvania, USA

History
- Built: 1910

The Homewood Branch of the Carnegie Library of Pittsburgh is an historic library which is located in the city of in Pittsburgh, Pennsylvania. It was built at 7101 Hamilton Avenue in the Homewood South neighborhood, and opened on March 10, 1910.

== History and architectural features ==
Designed by the architectural firm Alden & Harlow (architect Howard K. Jones was working for the firm at the time), it was added to the List of City of Pittsburgh historic designations on July 28, 2004, and the List of Pittsburgh History and Landmarks Foundation Historic Landmarks in 2004.

This library was featured in an episode of Mister Rogers' Neighborhood.

== Gallery ==
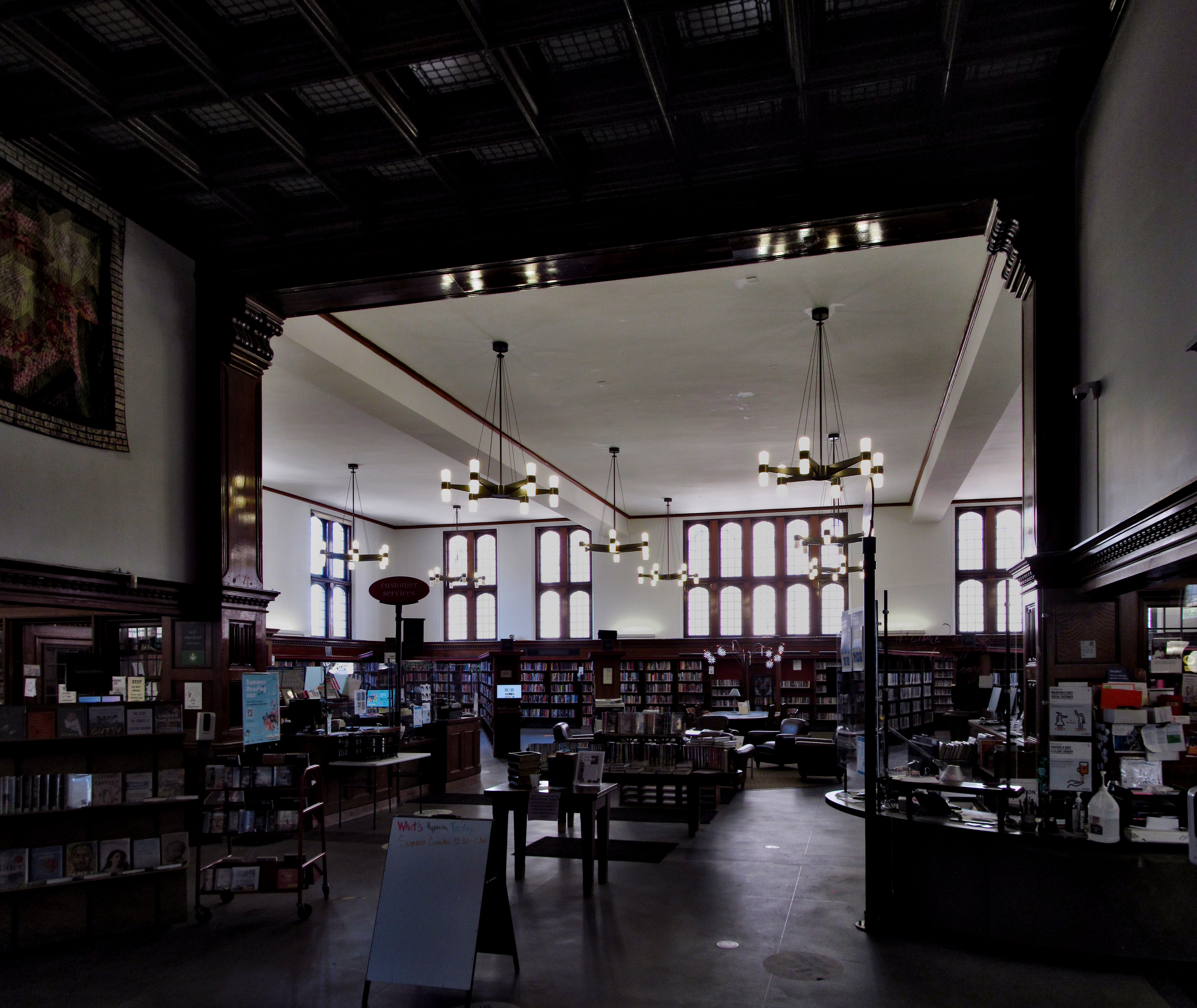
Carnegie Library, Homewood Branch, c. 2022
