= Mount Washington Branch of the Carnegie Library of Pittsburgh =

Public library in Pittsburgh, Pennsylvania, United States

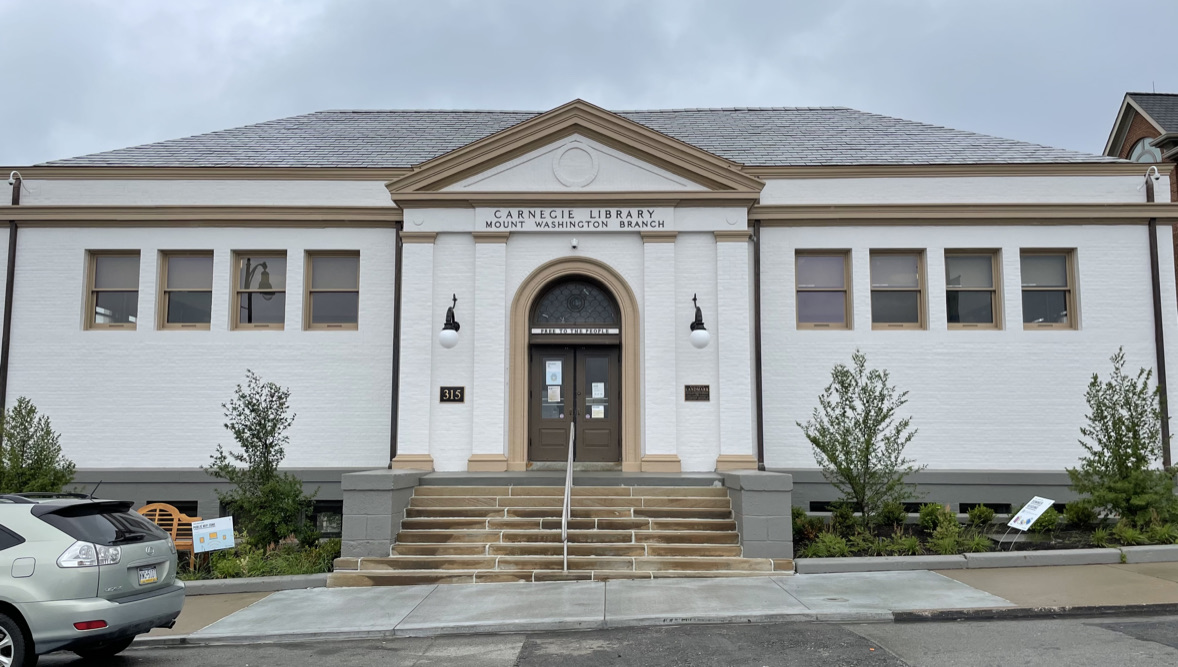
- Mount Washington branch of the Carnegie Library of Pittsburgh, facing Grandview Avenue

- Location within Pittsburgh
- 40°26′0.6″N 80°0′37.6″W
- Location: 315 Grandview Avenue, Pittsburgh, Pennsylvania, U.S.

History
- Built: 1900

Site notes
- Architect: Alden & Harlow

The Mount Washington Branch of the Carnegie Library of Pittsburgh located at 315 Grandview Avenue in the Mount Washington neighborhood of Pittsburgh, Pennsylvania, was built in 1900. It was designed by the architectural firm Alden & Harlow, and it was added to the List of City of Pittsburgh historic designations on July 28, 2004 and the List of Pittsburgh History and Landmarks Foundation Historic Landmarks in 1989.

The branch re-opened in 2021 following extensive renovations and expansion.

== Gallery ==
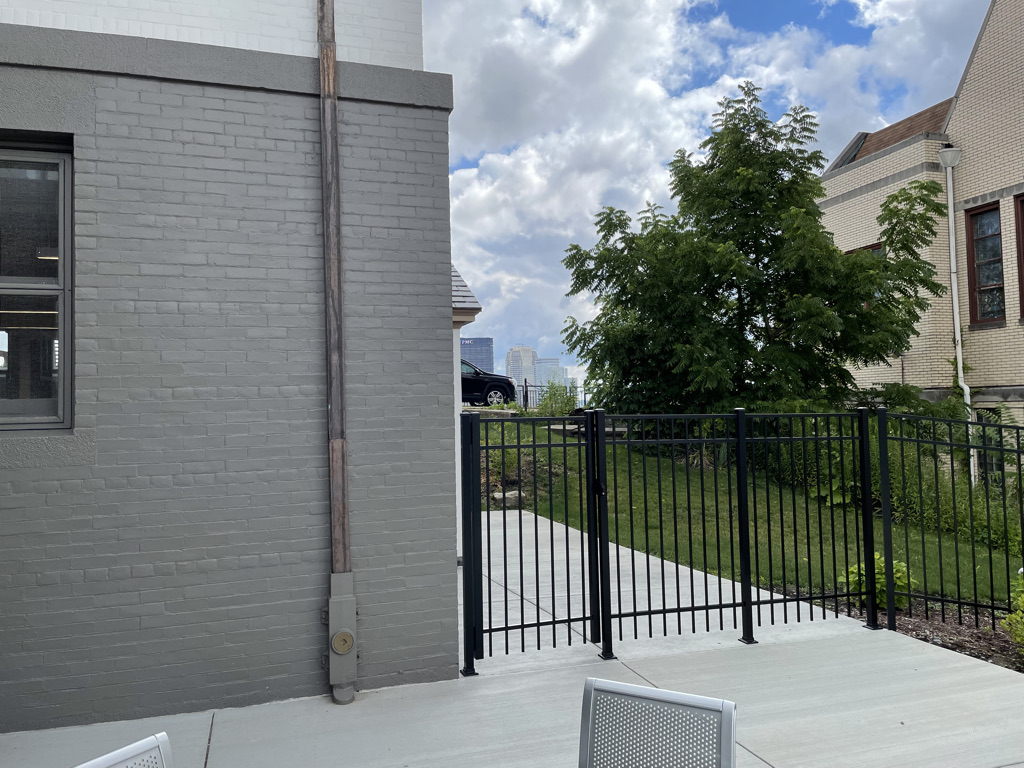
A view of Downtown Pittsburgh from the patio of the Mount Washington branch

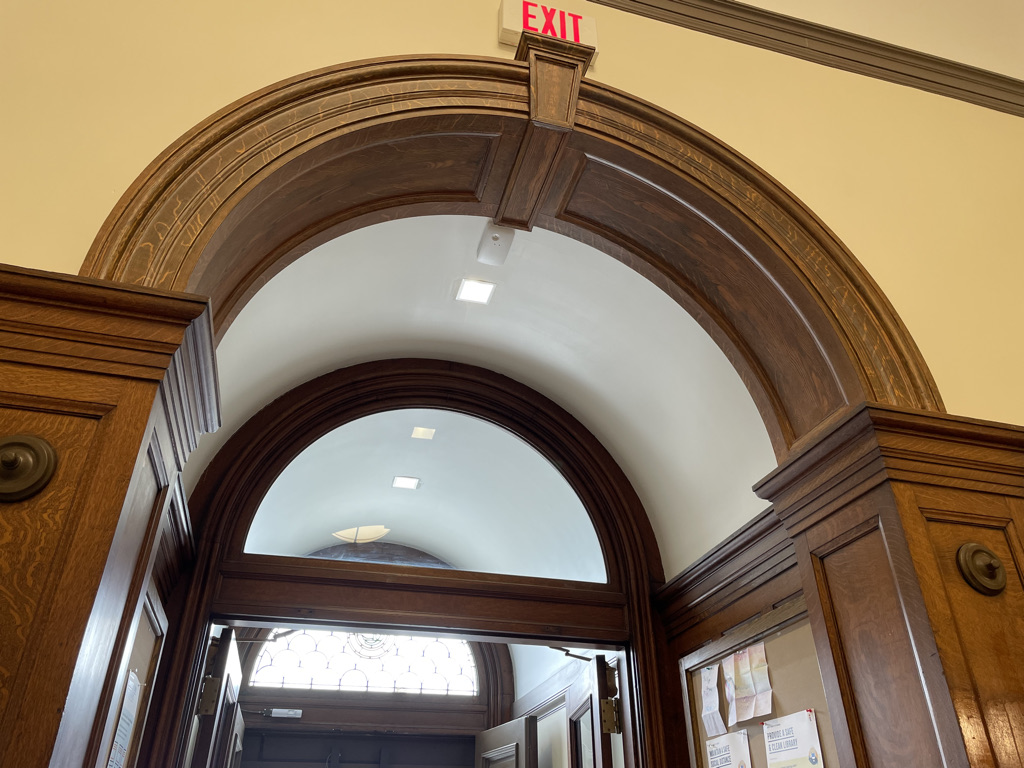
Arches above entrance of the Mount Washington branch of the Carnegie Library of Pittsburgh

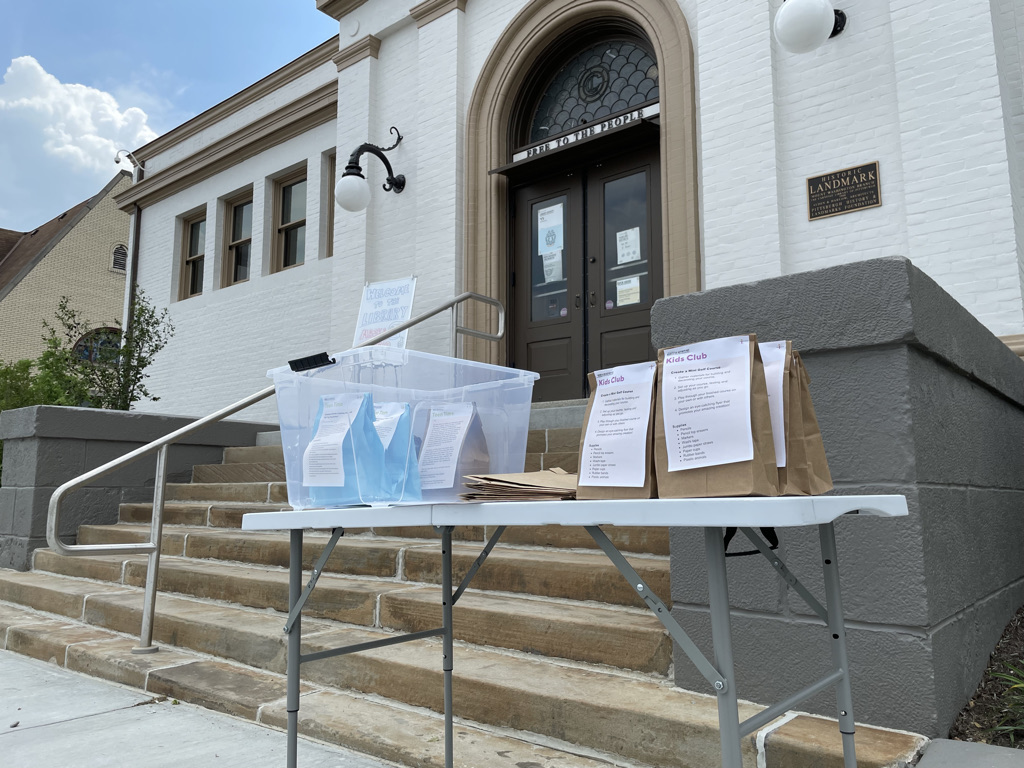
Children's programming kits being displayed and offered on the sidewalk in front of the Mt. Washington branch
