= Hazelwood Branch of the Carnegie Library of Pittsburgh =

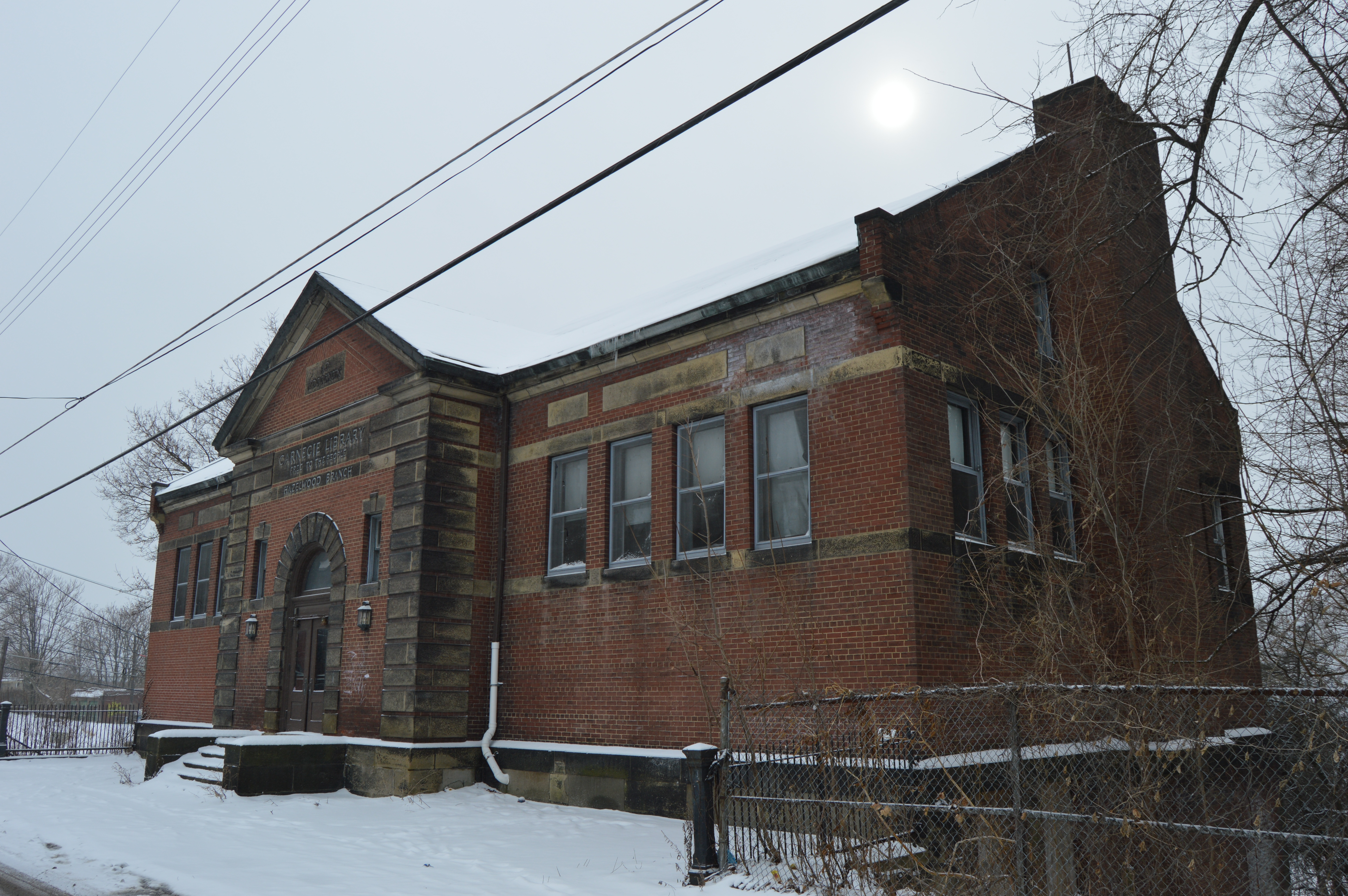
- Front and northern side

- Location within Pittsburgh
- 40°24′43.49″N 79°56′35.68″W
- Location: 4748 Monongahela Street (Hazelwood), Pittsburgh, Pennsylvania, USA

History
- Built: 1899

The Hazelwood Branch of the Carnegie Library of Pittsburgh, which is located at 4748 Monongahela Street in the Hazelwood neighborhood of Pittsburgh, Pennsylvania, was built in 1899. It was added to the List of City of Pittsburgh historic designations on July 28, 2004.

== History and architectural features ==
The Hazelwood Branch Carnegie Library left this location in mid 2004 and was reopened in a recently constructed building on Second Avenue.

In 2009 and again in 2011, the branch was threatened with closure due to funding shortfalls within the Carnegie Library system.

The Branch re-opened in a third location in a renovated church on Second Avenue in June 2014 after a $2.4 million restoration which doubled its original 3,500 square feet space to 7,000 square feet.

The Monongahela Street structure remains vacant.
