= Carnegie Library of Pittsburgh – South Side =

Carnegie Library of Pittsburgh- South Side
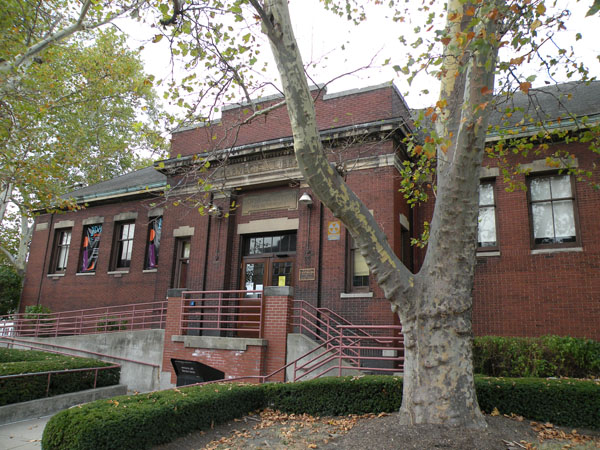

- Location of Carnegie Library Pittsburgh- South Side
- 40°25′43.08″N 79°58′27.31″W
- Location: 2205 East Carson Street (South Side Flats), Pittsburgh, Pennsylvania, USA

History
- Built: 1909

Pittsburgh Landmark – PHLF
- Designated: 1990

The Carnegie Library of Pittsburgh – South Side located at 2205 East Carson Street in the South Side Flats neighborhood of Pittsburgh, Pennsylvania, was built in 1909. It was designed by the architectural firm Alden & Harlow, and it was added to the List of Pittsburgh History and Landmarks Foundation Historic Landmarks in 1990.
