= West End Branch of the Carnegie Library of Pittsburgh =

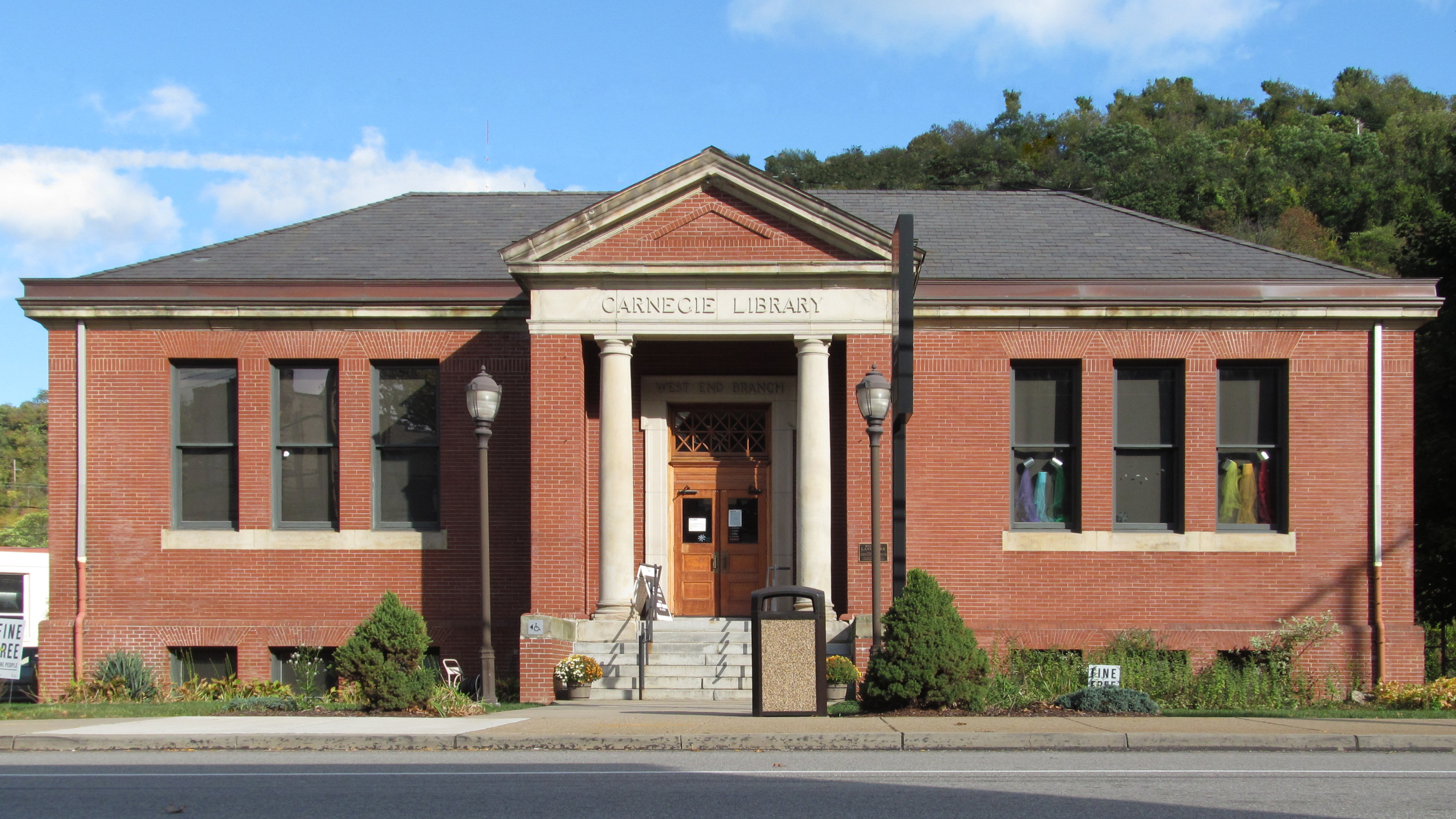

- Location within Pittsburgh
- 40°26′24.14″N 80°2′2.59″W
- Location: 47 Wabash Street (West End), Pittsburgh, Pennsylvania, USA

History
- Built: 1899

The West End Branch of the Carnegie Library of Pittsburgh, located at 47 Wabash Street in the West End neighborhood of Pittsburgh, Pennsylvania, opened on January 31, 1899. It was originally commissioned as part of Andrew Carnegie's first grant to Pittsburgh and was the third library in the Pittsburgh city system to open, following the Main Branch and the Lawrenceville Branch.

It was the eighth Carnegie funded library to open in America and only the second to have the new revolutionary policy of open or self-service shelves. The first with open shelves was Pittsburgh's Lawrenceville Branch, the sixth Carnegie library to open in America. The first five libraries to open in America, as well as the seventh, Carnegie Library of Homestead, were originally closed stack libraries where a clerk was used to fetch books for the patrons.

The West End Branch was added to the List of City of Pittsburgh historic designations on July 28, 2004.
