= History of Pittsburgh's South Side =

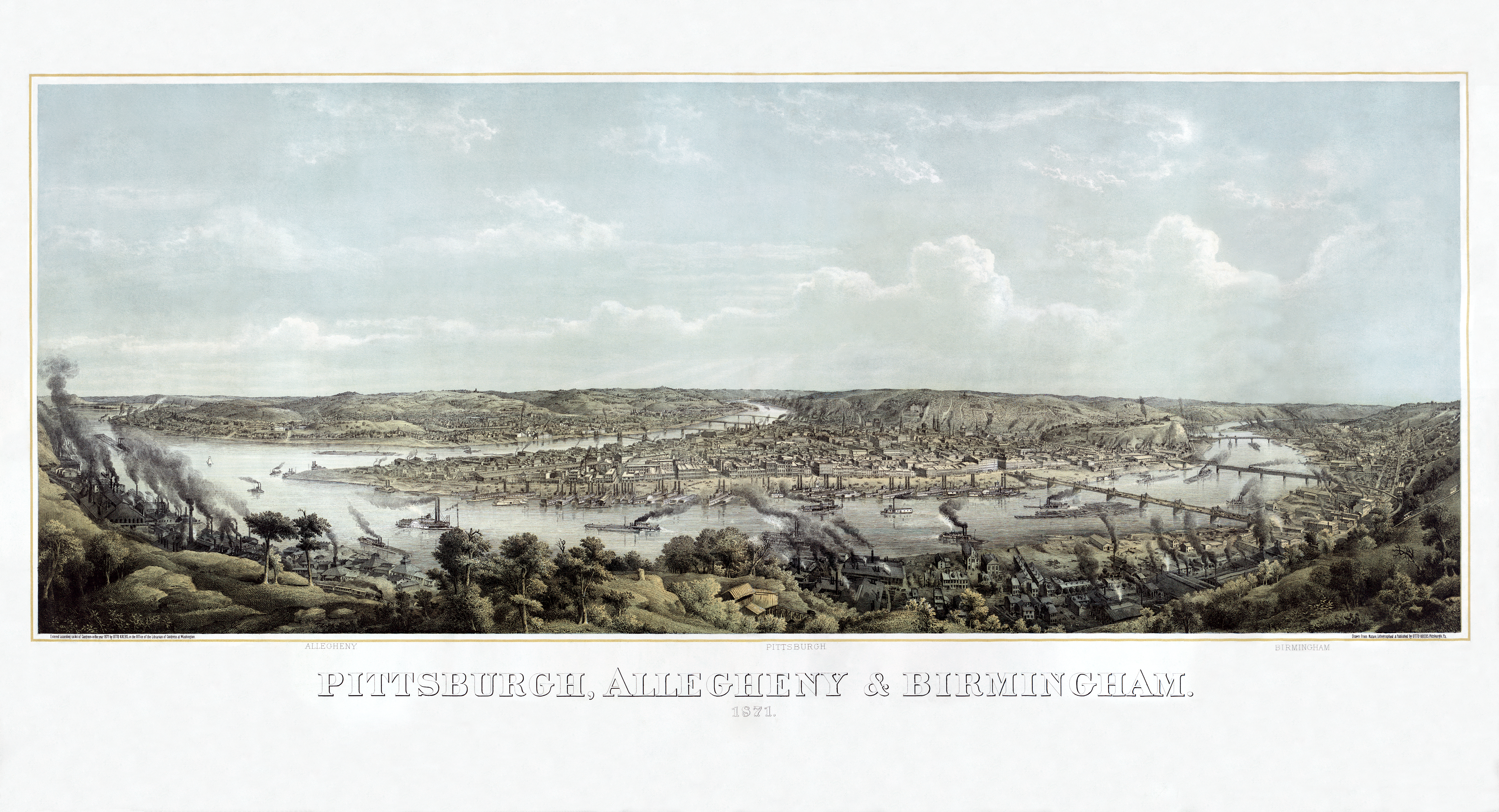
Bird's-eye view of Pittsburgh, Pennsylvania, at the confluence of the Monongahela, in the foreground, and the Allegheny Rivers; Birmingham (now South Side) is in the right foreground and Allegheny is in the distance on the left.

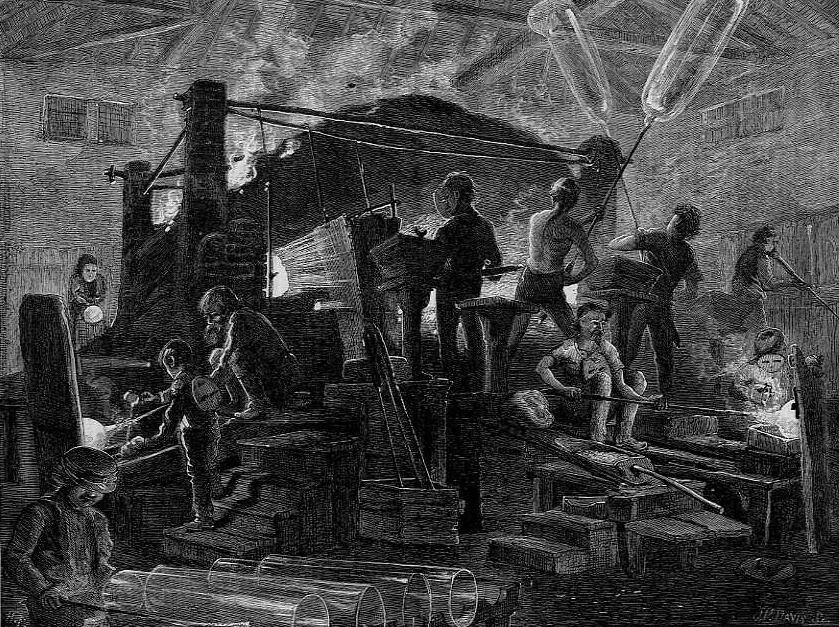
Pittsburgh Sketches – Among the Glass-Workers, 1871 engraving

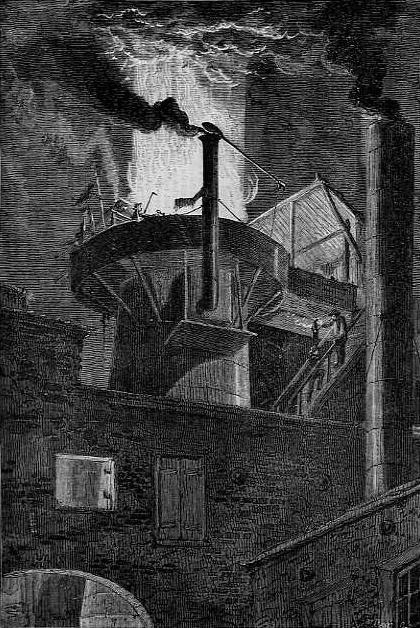
The Top of a Blast Furnace

The history of Pittsburgh's South Side dates back to the early colonial years of Pennsylvania, preceding the founding of the United States. It has since grown to become part of one of America's major cities and a hub for local universities and historic architecture.

== Early years ==
In 1763, King George III provided John Ormsby approximately 2,400 acres (9.7 km^{2}) along the south bank of the Monongahela River as payment for his services during the French and Indian War. The land was then divided into four boroughs: South Pittsburgh, Birmingham, East Birmingham, and Ormsby. The four boroughs were annexed into the City of Pittsburgh in 1872. These areas, collectively, provided for the foundation of the South Side as it is known today.

General James O'Hara and Major Isaac Craig, the pioneers of the glass industry in Pittsburgh, opened the first glass factory in the county in South Side, near the present-day Duquesne Incline parking area. By the early-to-mid 19th century, South Side was known as the center of glass industry in the United States of America. In 1876, there were about 76 glass factories in the neighborhood. The location was so nationally recognized for production, Presidents Andrew Jackson and James Monroe ordered glass tableware for the White House from companies operating in the area. South Side factories produced myriad glass products such as goblets, window glass, bottles, tableware, etc. By the 1920s, most of the glass factories had moved away from the area due to high taxes and lack of available real estate for expansion.

== Iron and steel mills ==
In concordance with many Pittsburgh neighborhoods, iron and steel mills in South Side became the workplaces of various immigrants, mostly from Eastern Europe. In 1854, Benjamin Franklin Jones and James Laughlin became business partners and formed American Iron Workers. Jones and Laughlin created the inaugural blast furnace and named it Eliza, which was located on the north side of the Monongahela River. This furnace was connected to South Side by the Hot Metal Bridge, still in use for vehicle traffic. By 1916, J & L operated six blast furnaces and nine 200–250 ton open furnaces. By 1929, J & L was producing 1.74 million tons of steel each year. However, the steel factories started to experience economic trouble in the 1960s. Due to these economic problems, there was a rapid decline of capital and J & L began to demolish the older buildings on their site. By 1989, the steel industry nationwide had almost entirely succumbed to international pressures and a changing market. Today an open-air retail, office, entertainment, and residential complex named The Southside Works is located in the area previously occupied by the J&L steel mill.

== Bridges ==
Before bridges were constructed in the area, the only way to cross the river was by ferry. Currently, Pittsburgh, deemed the “City of Bridges”, has a number of historic bridges that cross the Monongahela River into South Side. The Monongahela Bridge (now known as the Smithfield Street Bridge) was designed in 1818 and built of wood and iron. During the Great Fire of Pittsburgh in 1845, the bridge was destroyed by fire in a swift, ten-minute blaze. The bridge was then rebuilt in 1846 in an updated, wire rope Suspension Bridge construction, designed by John A. Roebling. The Liberty Bridge was built in 1928 and was designed by George S. Richardson. This bridge, which crosses over the South Side area, connects downtown Pittsburgh to the Liberty Tunnel.

List of other bridges currently or formerly located in the South Side area:

- Wabash Bridge (Demolished in 1948)
- Panhandle Bridge
- South Tenth Street Bridge
- Birmingham Bridge
- Hot Metal Bridge

== Inclines ==
Before cars or other ways of transportation were invented, horse-drawn trolleys were the only means of transportation in South Side. After the horse-drawn trolleys, then came the cable traction cars, and then finally the electric trolley. Horse cars operated in South Side until 1923. In 1915, the horse-drawn trolleys and the electric trolley met at the corner of Eighteenth and Sarah Streets. The electric cars turned into what were called street cars. They were the most common means of travel around Pittsburgh and South Side, until the first incline was opened. In 1877, The Duquesne Incline opened and ran from West Carson Street to Mount Washington. In 1870, the Monongahela Incline was built and it connected West Carson Street with Grandview Avenue. The Duquesne and Monongahela inclines are still in operation today. Some inclines that are not in operation today are: The Castle Shannon Incline No.1, The Knoxville Incline, The Mount Oliver Incline, and The St. Clair Incline. Inclines were also called Funiculars or Inclined Planes

== South Side today ==
Southside today is a neighborhood of approximately 10,000 people. It is home to one of the largest Victorian streets in the United States. East Carson Street in its entirety is designated as a historic district. The Southside Flats and Slopes are where most of the residents reside. In recent years, Southside has become home to a large student population because of its proximity to the Monongahela River and three large universities.

== Bibliography ==
- Boehmig, Stuart P. Pittsburgh’s South Side. Charleston: Arcadia Publishing, 2006.
