= South Side Flats =

Neighborhood in Pittsburgh, Pennsylvania, United States

- Neighborhood of Pittsburgh
- Country: United States
- State: Pennsylvania
- County: Allegheny County
- City: Pittsburgh

Area
  - Total: 0.94 sq mi (2.4 km^{2})

Population (2000)
  - Total: 5,726
  - Density: 6,100/sq mi (2,400/km^{2})
- East Carson Street Historic District
- U.S. National Register of Historic Places
- U.S. Historic district
- City of Pittsburgh Historic District
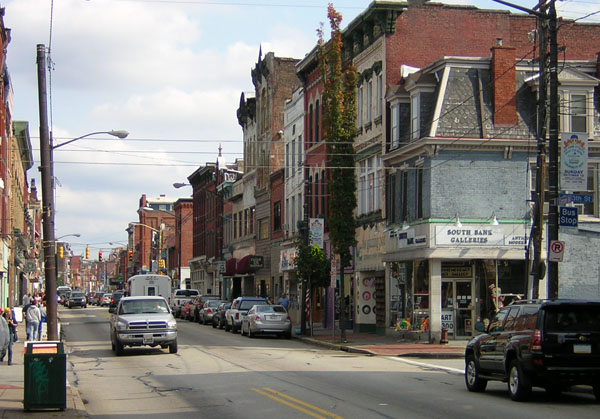
- East Carson and 13th in 2008.

- Location within Pittsburgh Location within Pennsylvania Location within the United States
- Location: Roughly E. Carson St. from 9th to 24th St., Pittsburgh, Pennsylvania
- Coordinates: 40°25′43.76″N 79°59′8.08″W
- Built: 1850
- Architect: Multiple
- Architectural style: Italianate, Romanesque, Second Empire
- NRHP reference No.: 83004183

Significant dates
- Added to NRHP: November 17, 1983
- Designated CPHS: August 16, 1993, and expanded June 1999

The South Side Flats is a neighborhood in Pittsburgh, Pennsylvania's South Side area. It is located just south of the Monongahela River. The neighborhood has one of the City of Pittsburgh's largest concentrations of 19th-century homes, which has prompted outsiders to call the neighborhood the city's Georgetown. It includes many bars and restaurants as well as residences. The main throughway in the South Side Flats is East Carson Street. The street is home to a significant portion of Pittsburgh's nightlife.

== History ==
The South Side was once composed of a number of smaller communities. These included Birmingham and East Birmingham, both named for the English Midlands industrial center, Birmingham; Ormsby, originally a part of East Birmingham, incorporated as a borough in 1866; South Pittsburgh, the area immediately adjacent to the Smithfield Street Bridge, and Monongahela, named for the adjacent Monongahela River. These boroughs were collectively annexed to the city in 1872.

The South Side and much of the hillsides to its south had been granted to Major John Ormsby in 1763, in recognition for his assistance in the building of Fort Pitt. By the 1770s, Ormsby had built an estate on these lands and established a ferry for connecting his home with the community in Pittsburgh.

In 1811, Ormsby's son-in-law, Dr. Nathaniel Bedford, laid out a town on the flats, naming it Birmingham in tribute to his native city. Bedford had come to Pittsburgh around 1770 and was the first practicing physician in the district known as Allegheny County. He named the streets after his Ormsby's children; names which the South Side streets still bear—Mary, Jane, Sarah, Sidney. Carson St. was named after a sea captain who lived in Philadelphia and was a friend of Dr. Bedford. In the early days it was part of the Washington Pike, the main road to Washington, Pennsylvania. The nearby municipality of Mount Oliver would be named for John Ormsby's son Oliver Ormsby. The two areas were once connected by a coal incline run by the Keeling Coal Company, now the site of South Side Park. Birmingham quickly became a sizable industrial center because of the easy access to river and rail transport. The region would first become a center of glass production, followed by a concentration of iron and steel manufacturing. In 1850, Benjamin Franklin Jones invested in a South Side iron works. During the depression of 1873, he formed a partnership with a banker, James H. Laughlin. The firm of Jones and Laughlin Steel Company would eventually become the South Side's largest employer. By 1910, it would employ over 15,000 workers. The expansion of the plant in 1950 would require the demolition of residential homes between 31st and 33rd streets.

The majority of workers who had settled in the area were immigrants of Eastern Europe. They found home throughout the Flats and Slopes of South Side and had brought much of their culture and traditions to the area. Many of the Eastern European churches, clubs and bars are still present in the South Side.

The decline of the steel industry was a major blow to the neighborhood. In addition to layoffs at the J&L Plant, the Levinson Steel Company which had been located on the South Side closed in 1981. The facility had been located along the river between 19th to 21st streets, and was later converted into a strip mall.

A series of arsons hit the South Side neighborhood in the early 1980s. Prominent buildings on the corner of 18th and Carson Streets and the Arcade Theater on Carson St. were also demolished by fire. The Arcade Theater had opened in 1929 and was the first theatre outside of Downtown Pittsburgh to have sound and air-conditioning.

The early 1980s saw the beginnings of redevelopment on the South Side. The Pittsburgh History and Landmarks Foundation helped establish and partner with the South Side Local Development Company in 1982. In 1985, the South Side's East Carson Street was selected to participate in the National Trust for Historic Preservation's Main Street Urban Demonstration Program. Community involvement played a major role in the redevelopment of the former J&L site.

The Jones and Laughlin Company had merged with the Ling-Temco-Vought (LTV) Corporation in 1974. The company would merge its J&L Steel subsidiary with Republic Steel to form LTV Steel in 1984. The South Side J&L/LTV plant shut down in 1986. Once closed, City of Pittsburgh Councilman Otis Lyon wanted the site's Bessemer converter building, an open hearth building, four smokestacks, and a J&L sign to be preserved. The plan fell through when it was determined that these structures posed a safety hazard, although the J&L sign is mothballed beneath the Panhandle Bridge for future use. Riverboat gambling was considered for the site and in 1993, and the City of Pittsburgh Urban and Redevelopment Authority (URA) purchased the site with money loaned by a potential developer for $9.3 million. The URA eventually redeveloped the site to be the Southside Works complex. The project has brought national retailers to the eastern end of the neighborhood.

== Geography ==
The South Side Flats is located at 40°25′43.76″N 79°59′8.08″W and covers 0.936 square miles (2.42 km^{2}).

The South Side Riverfront Park runs the majority of the border of the Flats to the Monongahela River. It hosts a myriad of events, like the annual Pittsburgh Dragon Boat Festival. The Three Rivers Heritage Trail also runs through the park.

== Surrounding and adjacent neighborhoods ==
The east–west section of the South Side Flats are bordered by the Pittsburgh neighborhoods of South Shore to the west and South Side Slopes to the south. The Flats then curve to follow a north–south direction; this segment is bordered by the Pittsburgh neighborhood of Arlington to the west and a very small section of Baldwin to the south.

The Flats run adjacent to three Pittsburgh neighborhoods across the Monongahela River and are directly linked via bridges. The Birmingham Bridge connects the Flats with the Bluff to the west. The north end of the Hot Metal Bridge connects the Flats with South Oakland to the northeast (left turn at end of bridge) and Hazelwood to the east (right turn).

== Demographics ==
Historical population
Year	Pop.	±%
1940	22,476	—
1950	17,942	−20.2%
1960	12,586	−29.9%
1970	9,260	−26.4%
1980	7,894	−14.8%
1990	6,177	−21.8%
2000	5,726	−7.3%
2010	6,597	+15.2%
Source: University of Pittsburgh

According to the 2000 census, there were 5,726 people living in the neighborhood and 3,613 total housing units within its boundaries. The racial makeup of the neighborhood was 95.2% White, 2.6% African American, 0.2% Native American, 0.7% Asian, 0.1% Pacific Islander, 0.2% from other races, and 1.0% from two or more races. Hispanics and Latinos of any race were 1.3% of the population.

Out of the total number of housing units, 86.7% were occupied. There were 9.2% of households with those under the age of 18 and 31.0% with those over the age of 65.

The population of the South Side Flats increased from 2000 to 2010, and much of the demographics did as well as a result of gentrification. Households with those over the age of 65 decreased from 31% in 2000 to just 11.8% in 2010.

According to the 2010 census, there were 6,597 people living in the neighborhood and 4,326 total housing units within its boundaries. The racial makeup of the neighborhood was 93.0% White, 3.0% African American, 0.1% Native American, 2.2% Asian, 0.0% Pacific Islander, 0.4% from other races, and 1.2% from two or more races. Hispanics and Latinos of any race were 2.5% of the population.

Out of the total number of housing units, 87.3% were occupied. 66.8% were renter occupied units, while nearly half of the vacant properties were listed for rent or rented but not occupied.

== Trivia ==
Kaufmanns Department Store was founded as a tailor shop on Carson St. on the South Side in 1871.

The South Side had the first electric railway in the City of Pittsburgh. The line started at 13th and Carson and traveled to Mount Oliver Borough.

The base of the Knoxville Incline was at 12th Street on the South Side. The incline was built in 1890, had an 18-degree curve, and was the longest incline ever built in Pittsburgh.

== Gallery ==
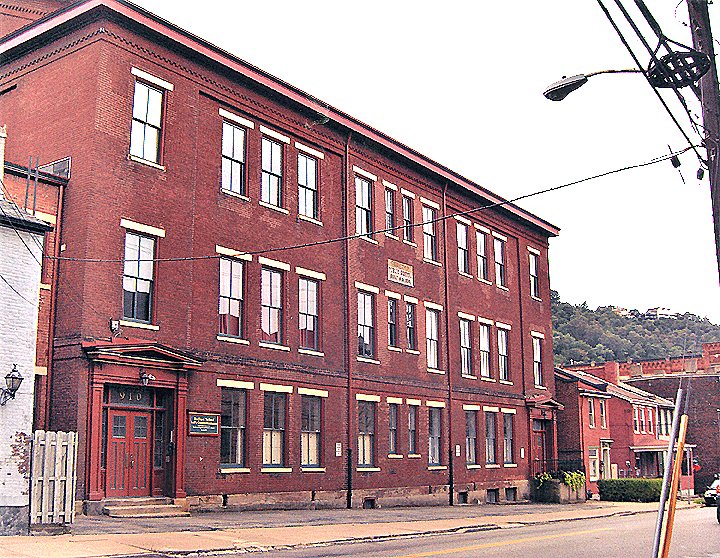
Bedford School, built in 1850, at 910 Bingham Street.

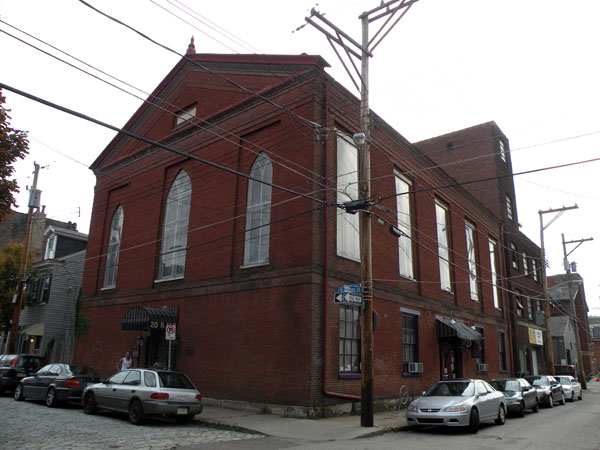
Former First Associate Reformed Presbyterian Church (now Gypsy Café), built 1854, at 20 South 14th Street.

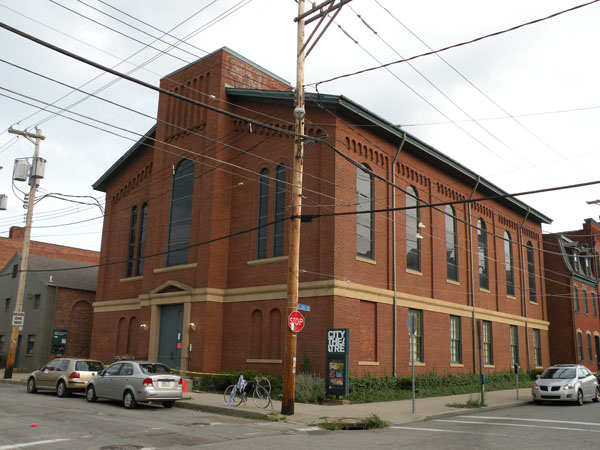
City Theatre, built in 1859, at 1300 Bingham Street.

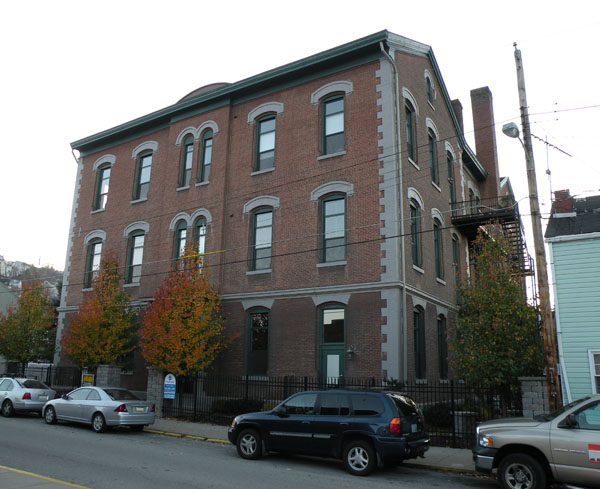
Birmingham Public School, built circa 1870, at 118–128 South 15th Street.

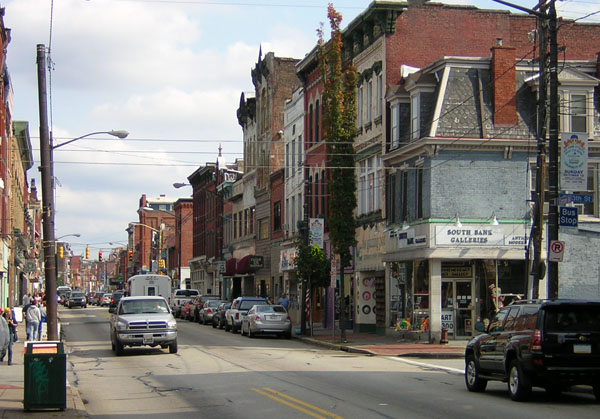
East Carson Street Historic District in the South Side Flats neighborhood of Pittsburgh, PA.

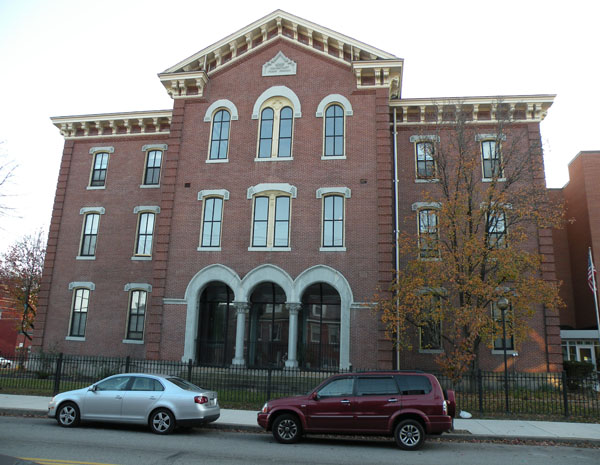
Samuel F.B. Morse School, built in 1874, at 2418 Sarah Street.

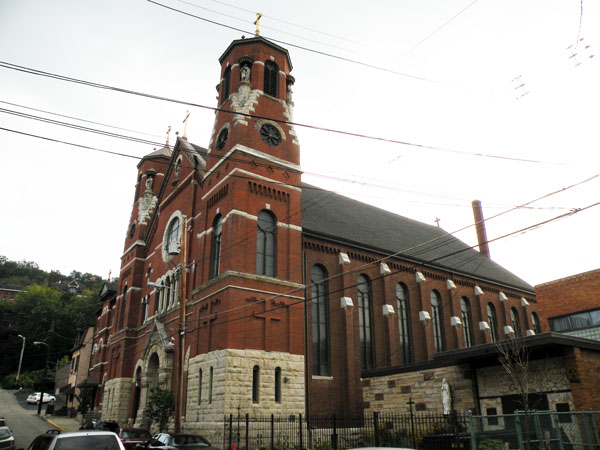
St. Adalbert Church, built in 1889, at 160 South Fifteenth Street.

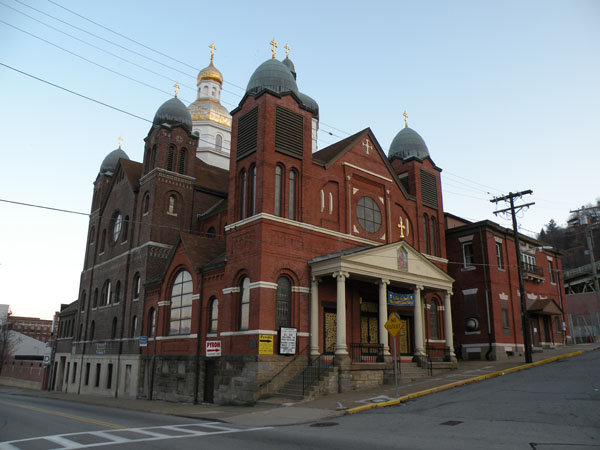
St. John the Baptist Ukrainian Catholic Church, built in 1895, at 109 South Carson Street.

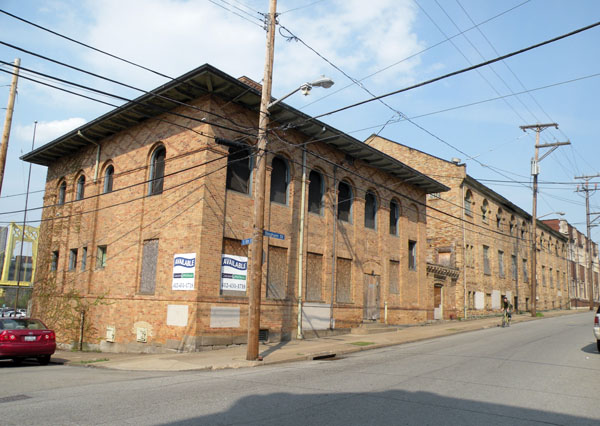
Former Garrison Foundry-Mackintosh Hemphill Company Offices, built in 1895 and 1902, at 901-911 Bingham Street.

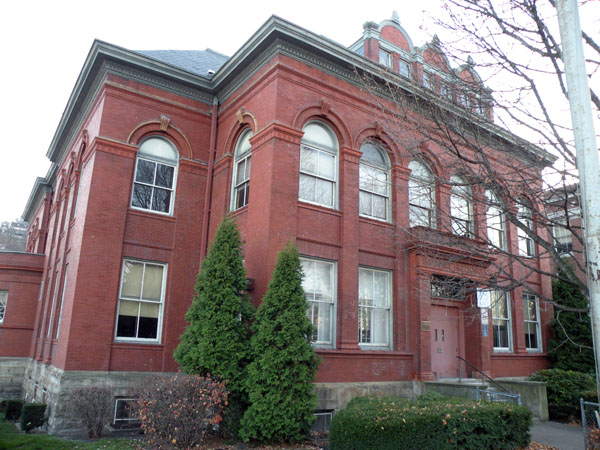
South Side High School, built in 1898, and then added to in 1924, at the corner of East Carson and South 10th Streets.

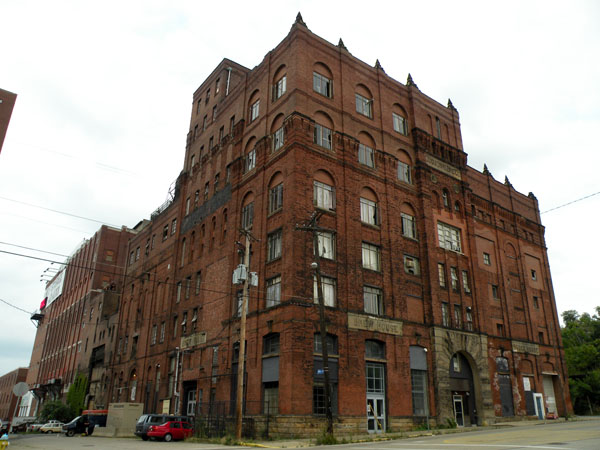
The old Duquesne Brewing Company Building, built in 1899, at Mary and 21st Streets.

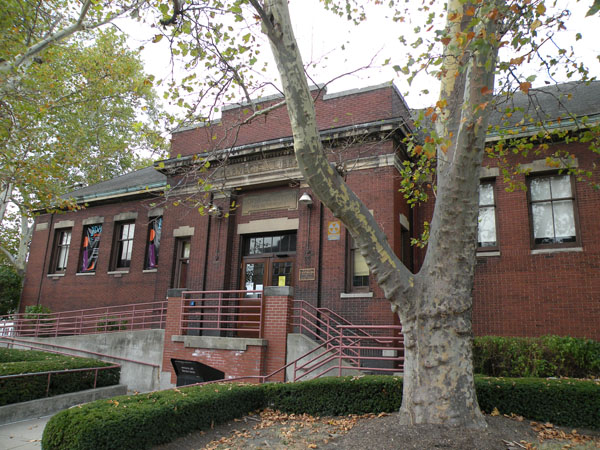
South Side Branch of the Carnegie Library of Pittsburgh, built in 1909, at 2205 East Carson Street.

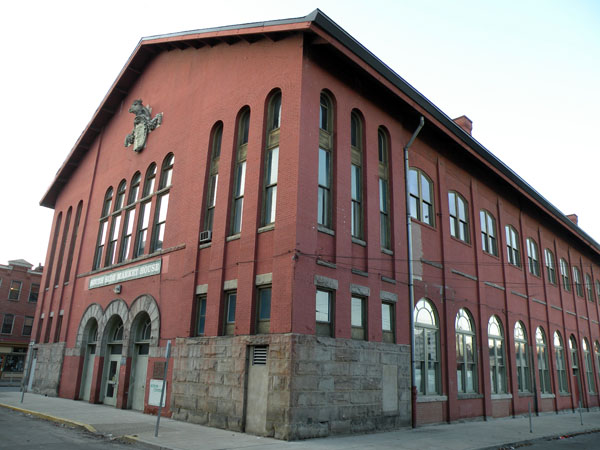
South Side Market Building (aka the "South Side Market House"), built in 1915, at South 12th and Bingham Streets (Bedford Square).

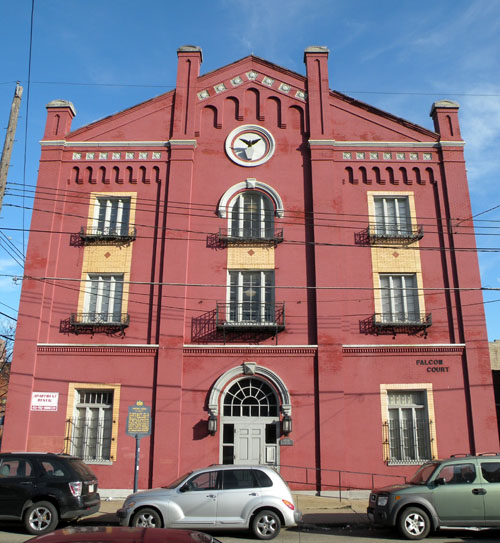
Polish Army site at 97 S. 18th Street.

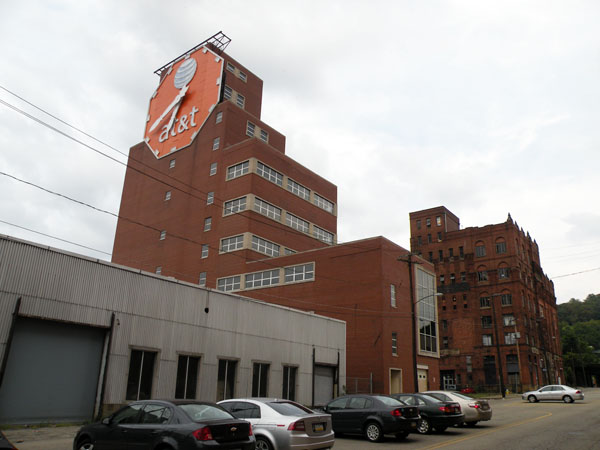
The Duquesne Brewing Company Clock (with AT&T logo on the face), built in 1933, at Mary and 21st Streets.

== See also ==
- List of Pittsburgh neighborhoods
- History of Pittsburgh's South Side
