= Knoxville (Pittsburgh) =

- Neighborhood of Pittsburgh
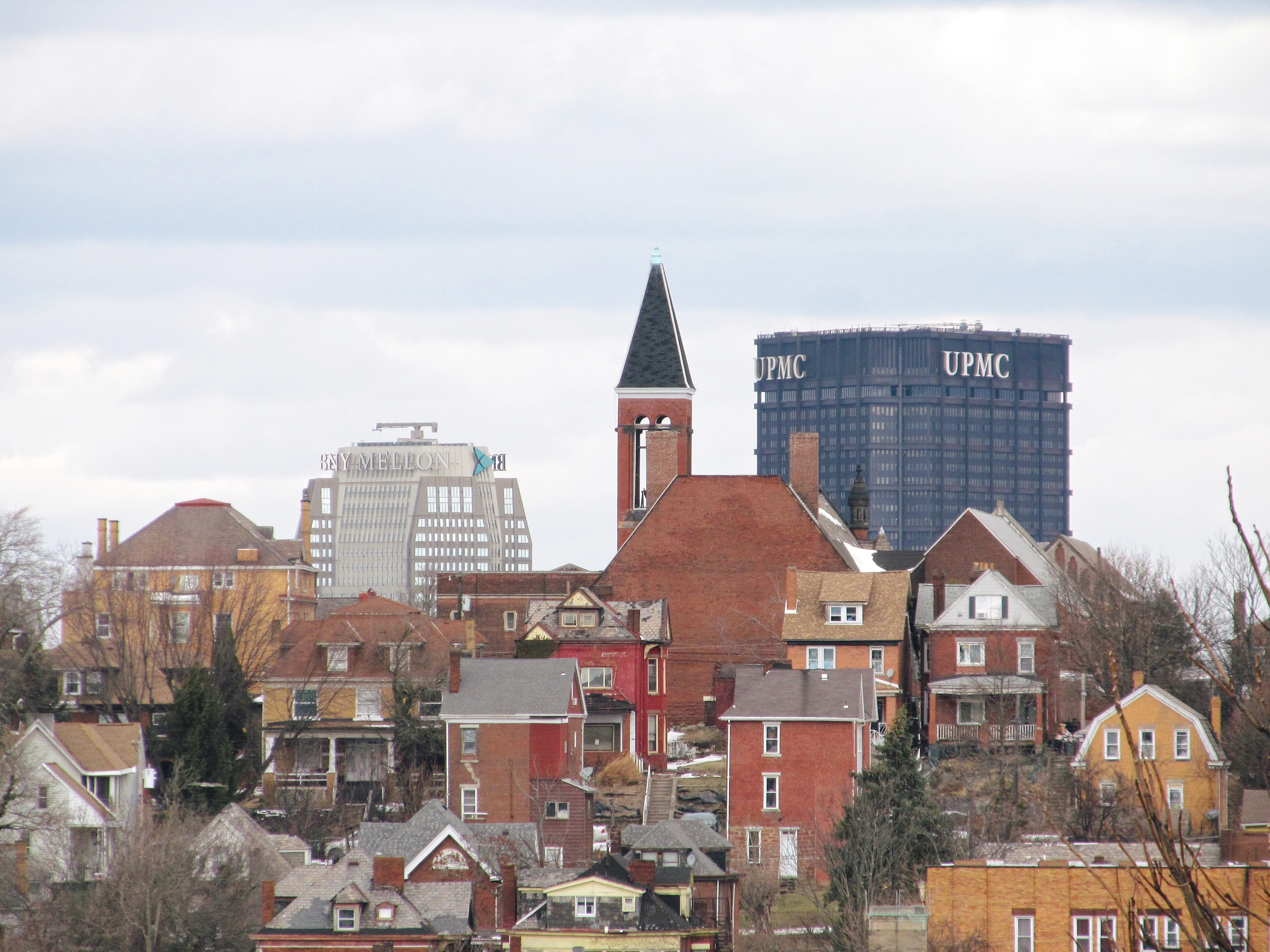
- Knoxville, with tops of Pittsburgh skyscrapers in the background

- Coordinates: 40.415°N 79.993°W
- Country: United States
- State: Pennsylvania
- County: Allegheny County
- City: Pittsburgh

Area
  - Total: 0.302 sq mi (0.78 km^{2})

Population (2010)
  - Total: 3,747
  - Density: 12,400/sq mi (4,790/km^{2})
- ZIP Code: 15210

Knoxville is a neighborhood in southern Pittsburgh, Pennsylvania, United States. It is part of zip code 15210, and has representation on Pittsburgh City Council by the council member for District 3 (Central South Neighborhoods).

== History ==
Knoxville Borough was incorporated on September 7, 1877, from that part of Lower St. Clair Township adjoining Beltzhoover and Allentown. Jeremiah Knox resided there in the early part of the nineteenth century, and established a fruit farm on the site. Strawberries grown at the farm were particularly well known. The location of Knoxville, on the second ridge from the Monongahela River, was a desirable location because it was shielded from the smoke emanating from the factories and mills of the South Side. Knox began to subdivide his farm for residential development in 1872. Knoxville became accessible from the South Side in the 1870s with the opening of an incline, the Mount Oliver Incline, and then by an electric railway, the Pittsburgh, Knoxville & St. Clair Electric Railroad, in 1888. Because of its desirable location and easy access to the South Side, Knoxville attracted many middle managers of the South Side mills as residents. Knoxville Borough was annexed by the City of Pittsburgh in 1927.

== Surrounding neighborhoods ==
Knoxville has five borders, including the Pittsburgh neighborhoods of Allentown to the north, Carrick to the south, and Bon Air and Beltzhoover to the west. The remaining border is with the borough of Mount Oliver to the east.

== See also ==
- List of Pittsburgh neighborhoods
- Mount Oliver Incline
- Knoxville Incline
