= St. John the Baptist Ukrainian Catholic Church =

Historic church in Pennsylvania, United States

- U.S. National Register of Historic Places
- Pittsburgh Landmark – PHLF
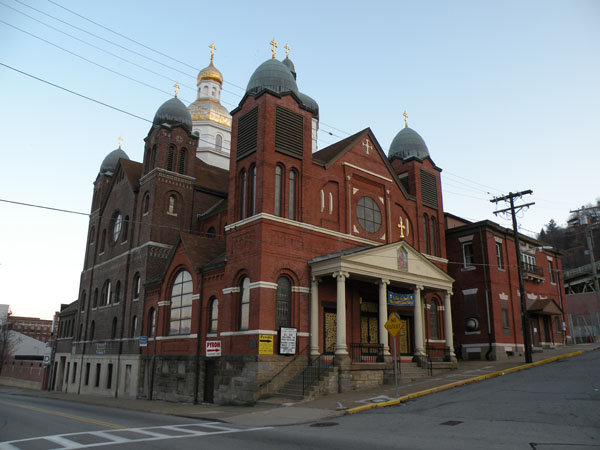

- Location within Pittsburgh Location within Pennsylvania Location within the United States
- Location: 109 S. 7th St., Pittsburgh, Pennsylvania
- Coordinates: 40°25′42″N 79°59′33″W
- Area: 1 acre (0.40 ha)
- Built: 1895
- NRHP reference No.: 74001747

Significant dates
- Added to NRHP: October 29, 1974
- Designated PHLF: 1968

St. John the Baptist Ukrainian Catholic Church is a historic Ukrainian Catholic church in the South Side Flats neighborhood of Pittsburgh, Pennsylvania. The parish is under the authority of the Ohio-based Eparchy of St. Josaphat in Parma.

The parish was established in 1891, initially holding services in the former Grace Lutheran Church at South 7th and Carson Streets. The present church was built on the same site in 1895 and expanded with a major addition in 1919. The building was designated a historic landmark by the Pittsburgh History and Landmarks Foundation in 1968 and was added to the National Register of Historic Places in 1974.
