= Fort Laughlin =

Coordinates: 40°25′07″N 79°58′30″W

- Pittsburgh, Pennsylvania in United States

Site information
- Type: American Civil War redoubt
- Controlled by: Union Army

Site history
- Built: 1863

Fort Laughlin was a Civil War redoubt, built in 1863 for the defense of Pittsburgh by the employees of Jones and Laughlin Iron Works, and named for James H. Laughlin. It was also known as Fort McKinley or Fort Ormsby. It was a circular earthwork on Ormsby's Hill, now part of Arlington Park on Arlington Avenue.

== History ==
Built along the bluffs of the Monongahela River in Pittsburgh, Pennsylvania in 1863 by Jones and Laughlin Iron Works in response to the threatened invasion of Pennsylvania by the Confederate States Army, this circular, earthen, Civil War redoubt was also known as "Fort McKinley" or "Fort Ormsby." It was located on Ormsby's Hill in what is now Arlington Park, which is located on Arlington Avenue and is bordered by Fernleaf, Salisbury, Sterling, and Fort Hill streets.

No remains of the structure were evident as of 2019.
