= Knoxville Incline =

Former railway in Pittsburgh, Pennsylvania, United States

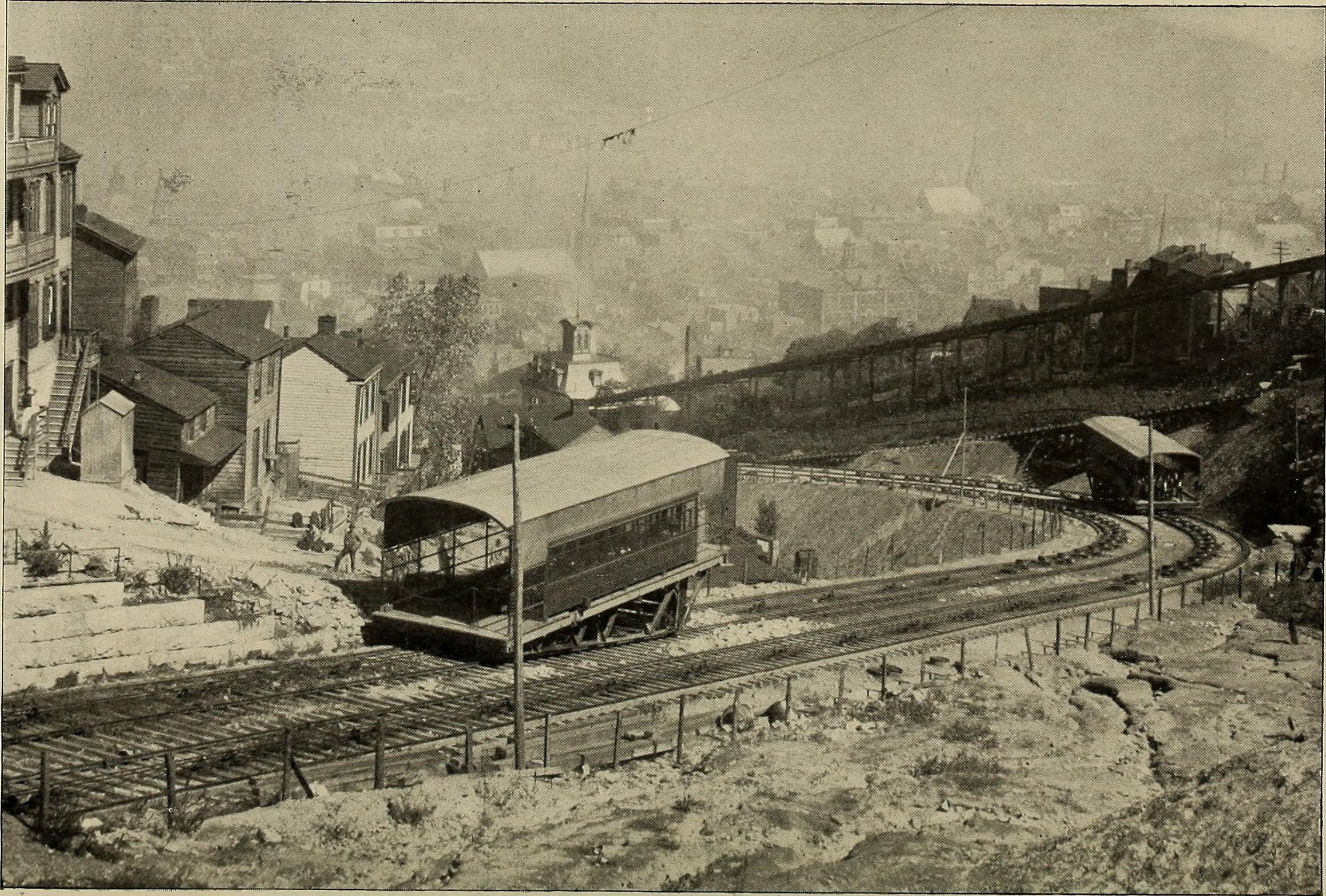

Overview
- Other name(s): Pittsburgh Incline
- Locale: Pittsburgh, Pennsylvania
- Coordinates: 40.424°N 79.988°W

Service
- Type: Funicular

History
- Opened: 15 August 1890
- Closed: 3 December 1960

Technical
- Line length: 2,644 feet (806 m)
- Track gauge: 9 ft (2,743 mm)

The Knoxville Incline was a broad gauge inclined railway that ran between Pittsburgh's South Side and Allentown neighborhoods. The incline was built in 1890 and had a track gauge of 9 feet (2,700 mm).

== History ==
The charter for this railway entered the planning phase by January 1890, with a target filing date of February 8 of that year, and was originally to be called the Arlington Avenue Inclined Plane. The last day of service was December 3, 1960, and it was demolished before the year ended. It was designed by John H. McRoberts, with a length of 2644 feet.

The Knoxville Incline briefly controlled the Pittsburgh, Knoxville & St. Clair Electric Railroad, and was then later controlled by Pittsburgh Railways. During its operation, the incline ferried people and freight between the South Side and Knoxville.

The Knoxville Incline and the nearby Mount Oliver Incline enabled the development of land in Allentown and surrounding communities on the hilltop. Like the Nunnery Hill Incline, the Knoxville Incline featured a curve, an unusual engineering feat for an incline.

== Fatal accident ==
On October 7, 1953 a boy, Alan Schiller, hanging from a car was killed. While it is commonly reported that Pittsburgh inclines recorded no fatalities, this, along with an incident on the St. Clair Incline, provide the only blemishes on the safety record of inclines in Pittsburgh. None of the fatalities occurred with paying passengers who had not jumped from cars.

== See also ==
- List of funicular railways
- List of inclines in Pittsburgh
- Mount Oliver Incline
- Pittsburgh, Knoxville & St. Clair Electric Railroad
