= Bedford School (Pittsburgh, Pennsylvania) =

- U.S. National Register of Historic Places
- Exterior of Bedford School

- Location within Pittsburgh Location within Pennsylvania Location within the United States
- Location: 910--918 Bingham St., Pittsburgh, Pennsylvania
- Coordinates: 40°25′45″N 79°59′22″W
- Area: less than one acre
- Built: 1850
- Architectural style: Greek Revival
- MPS: Pittsburgh Public Schools TR
- NRHP reference No.: 86002651
- Added to NRHP: September 30, 1986

Bedford School, located at 910 Bingham Street in the historic South Side Flats neighborhood of Pittsburgh, Pennsylvania, has been listed in the National Register of Historic Places since 1986. According to Pittsburgh History and Landmarks Foundation, it is the oldest public school building still standing within the city of Pittsburgh.

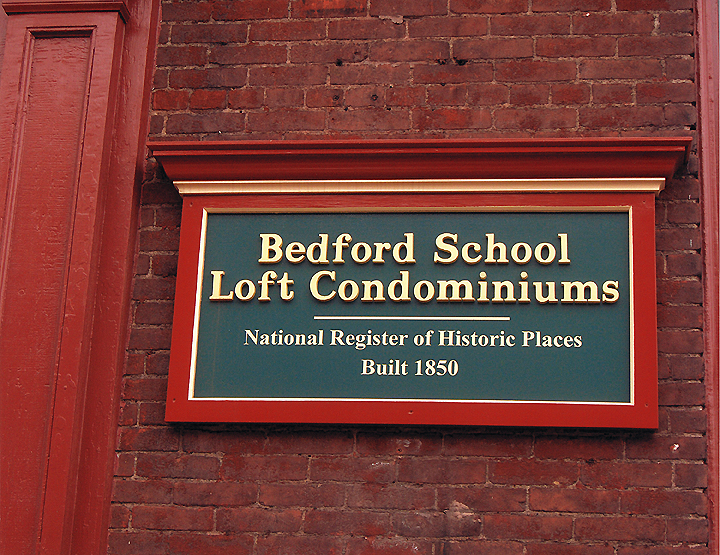
Exterior Sign, Bedford School, Pittsburgh

== History ==
Built in the Greek Revival style in 1850, the school opened as Birmingham No. 1, the largest public school on the South Side at the time. It was built to meet the growing need for classroom space in Birmingham, a manufacturing and residential borough that comprised the present South Side Flats between 6th and 17th Streets. Eighty pupils studied in the original four-room building. Boys attended classes on one side; girls on the other.

Greek Revival was the predominant architectural style for public buildings and homes built in southwestern Pennsylvania between about 1830 and 1860. Hallmarks of the style used in Bedford School include the pedimented entries with cornice returns and multi-light transoms and sidelights, brick dentils, unornamented lintels, and roof pitch. The inset panels of the second and third-floor windows are similar to features of some other Greek Revival buildings in Pittsburgh from the period.

The school was built with a cupola, like many other public schools in Pittsburgh in the mid-19th century. It housed the Birmingham town clock, purchased by the Birmingham Borough Council for $450 in 1850.

In 1872 the school joined the Pittsburgh school system, after the city of Pittsburgh annexed Birmingham and other South Side boroughs. The school changed its name to Bedford Public School in honor of Dr. Nathaniel Bedford, a physician at Fort Pitt, thought of as Pittsburgh's first doctor, as well as a large landowner on the South Side. Bedford had laid out streets and lots in Birmingham and named the town in 1811, for his birthplace in Birmingham, England. In his will, he gave the land to the Borough of Birmingham for a school.

=== Remodeling ===
A 1912 remodeling of the Bedford School reconfigured the classrooms, adding rooms and corridors. The Pittsburgh Board of Education annual report for 1912 states the following:

This building contained nine class rooms, each 24 ft. x 50 ft. with two teachers and two classes working in each room. Under these conditions teaching was almost impossible. The entire interior of the building was remodeled and contains twelve modern, fully equipped class rooms, properly connected by corridors. The outside privies were removed and replaced with a new two-story sanitary tower directly connected with the building.

The remodeling included an addition on the 10th Street side of the building. By 1912, Bedford School, under principal E. W. Dalbey of Wilkinsburg, had 14 teachers and 475 students.

By 1920 the Bedford School was the oldest public school building in use in the city of Pittsburgh. It operated as an elementary school until 1957, when the Pittsburgh Board of Education closed Bedford School.

=== Closing ===
The first floor served as a school for handicapped students until 1960, when the school board sold the building to Rhea S. Plack, wife of Milton Plack of Squirrel Hill, who used it as storage for L & M Sales, his wholesale hardware and contracting supplies firm. In 1997, Milton Plack sold the building to Frontier Lofts of the South Side, which converted it to condominiums under the direction of Pittsburgh real-estate developer Joedda Sampson. Among eight units, several of which have loft space, all have features of the original classrooms, including hardwood flooring and lighting fixtures, and many retain original blackboards.

The renovation is described in this 2002 Pittsburgh-Post Gazette newspaper article.
