= Birmingham Public School =

- U.S. National Register of Historic Places
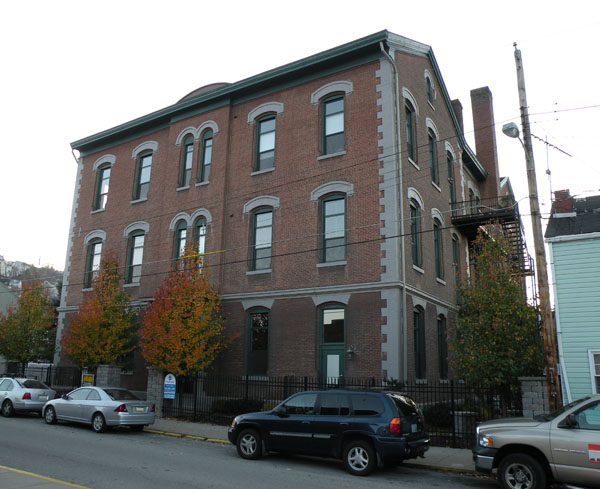

- Location within Pittsburgh Location within Pennsylvania Location within the United States
- Location: 118--128 S. Fifteenth St., Pittsburgh, Pennsylvania
- Coordinates: 40°25′38.11″N 79°59′1.29″W
- Area: less than one acre
- Built: 1871
- Architectural style: Italianate
- MPS: Pittsburgh Public Schools TR
- NRHP reference No.: 86002658
- Added to NRHP: September 30, 1986

The Birmingham Public School is an historic school building in the South Side Flats neighborhood of Pittsburgh, Pennsylvania, United States.

Listed on the National Register of Historic Places in 1986, it currently functions as an apartment building.

== History and architectural features ==
This historic structure was built in 1871 by the Borough of Birmingham in Allegheny County, Pennsylvania, a community that was annexed by the city of Pittsburgh the following year.

A three-story, brick building that features gabled eastern and western sections that are connected by hipped-roof middle section, its "twin facades have slightly projecting center bays with segmentally arched entries with stone surrounds and overhanging hoods."

In 1944, this building was sold to the Catholic Church and served as the middle school for St. Adalbert's Parish.

It was listed on the National Register of Historic Places in 1986. It is currently an apartment building.
