= Allentown, Pittsburgh =

Allentown
- Neighborhood
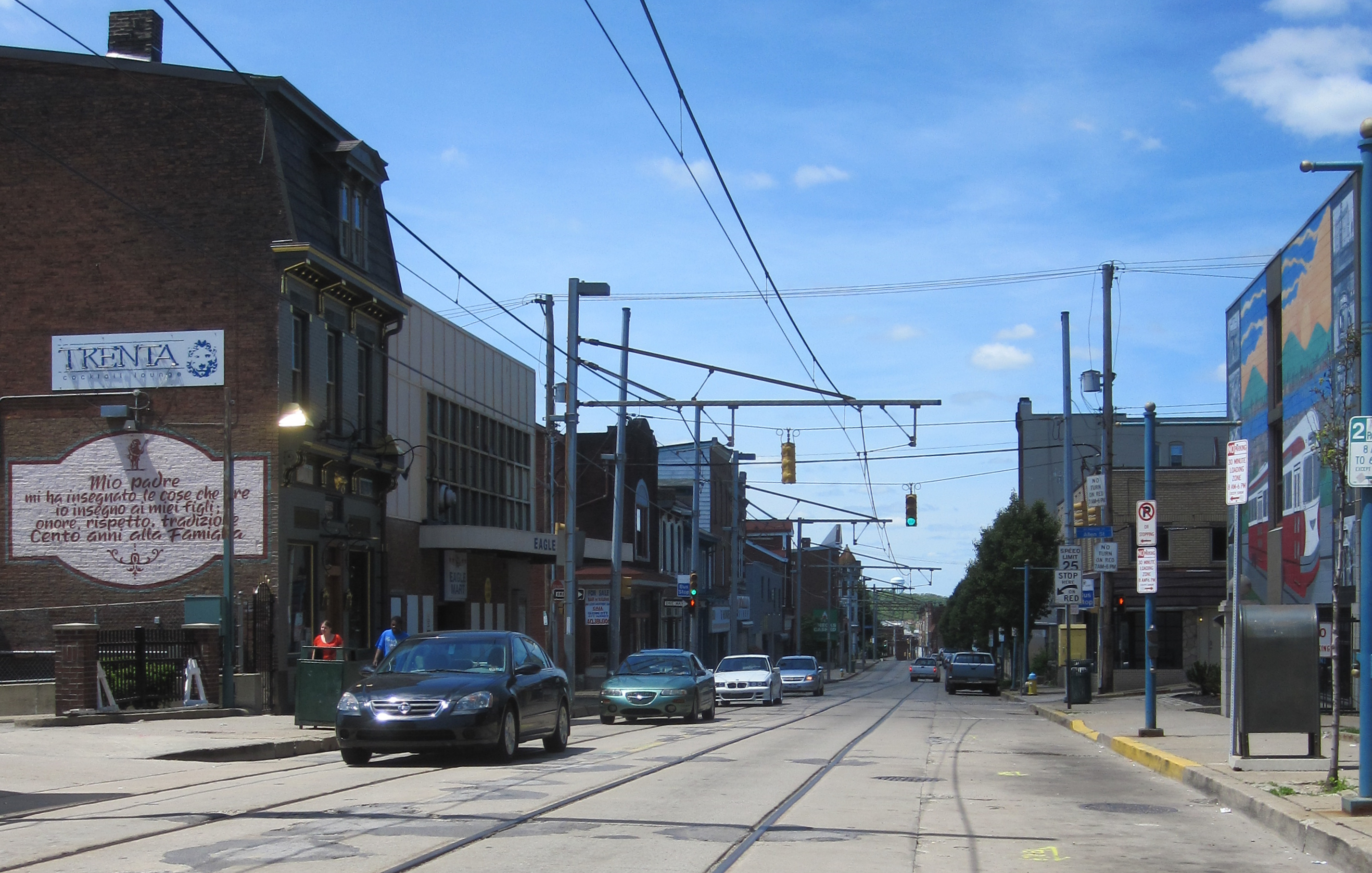
- East Warrington Avenue in the Allentown neighborhood of Pittsburgh

- Coordinates: 40.421°N 79.994°W
- Country: United States
- State: Pennsylvania
- County: Allegheny County
- City: Pittsburgh

Area
  - Total: 0.295 sq mi (0.76 km^{2})

Population (2010)
  - Total: 2,500
  - Density: 8,500/sq mi (3,300/km^{2})
- ZIP Code: 15203, 15210

Allentown is a neighborhood located in the southern portion of the city of Pittsburgh, Pennsylvania. The ZIP code used by residents is 15210, and has representation on the Pittsburgh City Council by the council member for District 3 (Central South Neighborhoods).

== History ==
Beltzhoover Avenue is a north-south thoroughfare that separates Allentown and Knoxville (to the east) from Beltzhoover and Mt. Washington (to the west). The city of Pittsburgh expanded and absorbed these areas lying southward of the original city of Pittsburgh.

Allentown was carved out of St. Clair Township, which was one of the original townships of Allegheny County. On April 26, 1827, Joseph Allen, an Englishman, purchased the land that would eventually be known as Allentown from Jeremiah Warder. Incorporated on March 2, 1870, and annexed by the City of Pittsburgh on April 2, 1872, Allentown was settled by many skilled German immigrants who established businesses. Welsh, Irish, and English settlers made up the second largest immigrant population.

Allentown developed quickly due to its convenient location to downtown Pittsburgh as well as due to the available transportation. Two main roads south from Pittsburgh merged on the hilltop in Allentown: Washington Road (today’s Warrington Avenue) and Brownsville Turnpike Road (today’s Arlington Avenue). The neighborhoods were connected at first by horse-drawn streetcars and later by the electric streetcar. In 1888 Allentown became the first site west of the Allegheny Mountains to operate an electric streetcar. Ever since then the trolley, or ‘T’, has run up Warrington Avenue, Allentown's main thoroughfare, keeping hilltop residents connected to downtown Pittsburgh. Today, though, the T does not make any stops in the neighborhood, and the line (most recently known as the Port Authority's Brown Line) is used as an emergency route when the South Hills Transit Tunnel is closed. In the past, there were also five inclines that served Allentown, the most famous of which was the curved Knoxville Incline with a station at the intersection of Warrington and Arlington Avenues. Several bus routes, and many more roads connect the neighborhood with the downtown, South Side, and beyond.

Historical population
Census	Pop.	Note	%±
1940	8,227		—
1950	7,487		−9.0%
1960	6,416		−14.3%
1970	5,361		−16.4%
1980	4,292		−19.9%
1990	3,600		−16.1%
2000	3,220		−10.6%
2010	2,500		−22.4%
2020	2,305		−7.8%

== See also ==
- List of Pittsburgh neighborhoods
