= St. Clair Incline =

Former funicular in Pittsburgh, Pennsylvania

Overview
- Locale: South Side Slopes, Pittsburgh, Pennsylvania
- Coordinates: 40.4218°N 79.9746°W

Service
- Operator(s): St. Clair Incline Plane Company

History
- Opened: March 5, 1888
- Dismantled: 1934
- Closed: c. 1932

Technical
- Line length: 2,060 ft (630 m)
- Track gauge: 5 ft 8 in (1,727 mm)

The St. Clair Incline, also known as the South Twenty-second Street Incline, was built in 1886–1888 and operated by St. Clair Incline Plane Company. It was a double track incline on the South Side Slopes of Pittsburgh from Josephine Street to Salisbury Street. The lower station was near the intersection of S. 22nd Street and Josephine. The upper station was on Salisbury Street across from the former Fort Laughlin site eventually occupied by Arlington Playground.

The incline was 2,060 ft (628 m) long, with a vertical rise of 361 ft (110 m). It was designed by engineer J. H. McRoberts. As it carried both freight and passengers over steep tracks laid on the ground, it could be considered to be a cable railway. Its path was not of constant slope but became progressively steeper toward the top, tracing a parabolic arc. It is uncertain exactly when the incline closed permanently, but it was reported as shut down in a 1932 Associated Press article about the "passing" of Pittsburgh's inclines. The structure was dismantled in 1934.

== Fatal accidents ==
At 3:30 in the morning of April 6, 1909, an accident occurred when engineer Jesse Burton fainted against the controls, releasing the brake. As the upbound car reached the top, it slammed into the upper support, bounced away and rolled freely back down the grade. The impact had knocked both cables from their drums, so the car at the lower station did not provide a counterbalance on the move. The night turn had ended shortly before at D.O. Cunningham Glass on Jane St. near the lower station, and the upbound car was taking some passengers home. After the impact at the top, three young men jumped during their descent. One, Frank Bredl, 17, jumped early and survived. The others, Albert Klingenberger, 16, and Arthur Miller, 17, died from their injuries. A postcard of the era showed the aftermath of the accident.

On July 22, 1915, a car ran over a 19-month-old baby who attempted to follow his two older sisters across the tracks.

Another fatality occurred on March 10, 1919, when a gate on one of the moving cars swung open. A 17-year-old girl who had been leaning on the gate fell to the tracks and was run over by the car wheels.

== See also ==
- List of funicular railways
- List of inclines in Pittsburgh

== Maps ==
- 1916 Map of Pittsburgh, showing name and location
