= Pittsburgh, Knoxville & St. Clair Electric Railroad =

Overview
- Headquarters: Pittsburgh, Pennsylvania
- Locale: Allegheny County
- Dates of operation: 1886–1892
- Successor: Pittsburgh & Birmingham Traction Company

Technical
- Track gauge: Pennsylvania Trolley Gauge, 5 ft 2 1/2 in (1,588 mm)
- Length: 2 miles (3.2 km) in 1890

Pittsburgh, Knoxville & St. Clair Electric Railroad was one of the earliest electric street railways. A licensee of the Daft System, the line struggled with difficult terrain, required expensive bridges, and failed financially within just 3 years of opening.

== History ==
Chartered June 22, 1886, the Pittsburgh, Knoxville and St. Clair Street Railway Company began at Carson Street, followed South 13th south to a ramp which included a toothed rack system, and after crossing the Pittsburgh, Virginia and Charleston Railway, ran to the top of the hill, then along the ridge line on Arlington Avenue to the city line at Brownsville Road.

A contemporary account during construction put construction costs at between $140,000 and $150,000 per mile. While the line opened June 25, 1888, it was already in financial trouble, and promptly stopped operating. 5 12-ton motors with the Daft propulsion design drew 16 foot trailers to haul passengers over a line with a maximum grade of 15.48%.

The operation proved troublesome from the start. A motor failed and ran away with a car in tow, before derailing, wrecking at Pius Street near St. Michael's Church. At least one of the injured passengers suffered wounds which were initially considered possibly fatal. The line had not as yet been formally accepted from the Daft and Company firm which had been involved in its construction, and engineers from that company laid the incident at failure to lower the sprocket wheel to the rack system when the motor failed. Additionally, the route's terrain made its operation fragile: Snow was known to put it out of operation.

While problematic, the line was considered to be a demonstration of the Daft system, and so it was little surprise that a number of pictures were posed. Of 7 pictures known to exist, six appeared in the Street Railway Review, and showed the rack system and the motor-trailer operation of the system.

The line was locally considered to have failed by January 1890, due to issues with the conduit which ran down the center of South Thirteenth Street. But by the end of the month, when the Knoxville Incline was planning to apply for the charter, the line had according to contemporary accounts just managed to resume normal operations. By the time that incline opened in the summer of 1890, they had acquired a controlling interest in the St. Clair Electric Railroad.

By December 26, 1890, the line failed, leaving the connecting Suburban Rapid Transit Co., another Daft system, without power, as that system lacked its own substation.

At the demands of the creditors, the line was sold in 1892. The line was purchased by Murray Verner for $2,500 plus $60,000 due on the mortgage and $18,000 in receiver certificates. The Arlington Avenue portion of the line was subsequently used by the Pittsburgh & Birmingham Traction Company to provide service to the hilltop communities of Knoxville, Allentown and Beltzhoover. The line was abandoned on the hillside below Washington (now Warrington) Avenue. Verner was the president of the Birmingham Traction Company at the time of the purchase.

At about the same time this line was acquired by Birmingham Traction, the adjacent Mount Oliver Incline was acquired, triggering a lawsuit over the legality of company with a street railway charter owning an inclined railway. This suit, combined with the purchase of the Pittsburgh, Knoxville & St. Clair Electric Railroad property which was then not operated, suggests the possibility that if the suit failed, the Birmingham Traction company would have an alternate connection to its extant hilltop lines prior to those lines being directly connected by rail down the side of the hill to the river valley below, but there is no documentation of this plan.

== See also ==
- Pittsburgh Railways
