= John Ormsby (settler) =

- Born: 1720; Ireland
- Died: December 1805 (aged 84–85); Allegheny County, Pennsylvania
- Resting place: Trinity Churchyard
- Education: Trinity College, Dublin
- Spouse: Jane McAllister
- Children: Oliver, Jane, Sarah, Mary, Sidney, and John
- Parent(s): Oliver Ormsby, Deborah Barry

John Ormsby (1720–1805) was a soldier in the French and Indian War, Pontiac's Rebellion, and the American Revolution, and among the first settlers of Pittsburgh, Pennsylvania. The son of the Anglo-Irish landed gentry, he emigrated from Ireland to the Thirteen Colonies in 1752. After Pontiac's Rebellion, he received a land grant from King George III, and established a homestead on the banks of the Monongahela River. He established extensive economic and merchant interests in Bedford, Pennsylvania, and at the head of the Ohio River.

== Family ==
John Ormsby was born in 1720 in Ireland, the son of Oliver Ormsby and his wife Deborah Barry. The family was part of the Anglo-Irish gentry; Oliver Ormsby was the third son of Robert Ormsby and Mary Blakeney. The family held an extensive estate, Cloghan, in County Mayo, near the towns of Newton, Ballina, and Gore. Oliver Ormsby married Deborah Barry, the child of a junior branch of the House of Barrymore, whose founder achieved fame in the Eighty Years' War. Ormsby was educated at Trinity College in Dublin. Upon completion of his studies, he emigrated to the Thirteen Colonies. There Ormsby established a small teaching academy in Philadelphia in 1753; the following year, he taught in Lancaster and York, Pennsylvania, and Alexandria, Virginia, in 1754.

== Military career ==
Coat of Arms of John Ormsby

John Ormsby was a soldier in the French and Indian War. Ormsby was "offered a captain's commission in the colonial contingent of General Braddock's army," but was unable to take any position in the army until 1758, due to a malarial fever lasting three years. When he could join the army, he fought under the command of John Forbes and George Washington to capture Fort Duquesne from the French in 1758.

Ormsby served as King's Commissary as well as paymaster during the erection of Fort Pitt under John Stanwix from 1759 to 1760. He lived in Fort Pitt in 1761.

During Pontiac's Rebellion in 1763, Indians destroyed his property, stole his horses and goods, and murdered his employees, although there is some controversy about who actually destroyed his property. He later claimed that Stanwix had ordered his house and store destroyed because the Indians were using its provisions and the structures as shelter during their attacks on the fortifications. Ormsby aided in the defense of Fort Pitt during the rebellion. The Indians cut off all supplies to Fort Pitt and maintained a constant offensive. John Ormsby wrote of this, "there was not a pound of good flour or meat to serve the garrison and a number of the inhabitants who joined me to do duty." English troops under the command of Henry Bouquet arrived with food and munitions and defeated the Indians surrounding Fort Pitt.

== Land grant ==
John Ormsby received a land grant from George III in 1763 for 3,000 acres (12 km^{2}) along the south shore of the Monongahela River, in return for his military service. Present-day communities that now occupy the land grant include South Side Flats, South Side Slopes, Mount Oliver, and Carrick.

== "Father" of the South Side ==
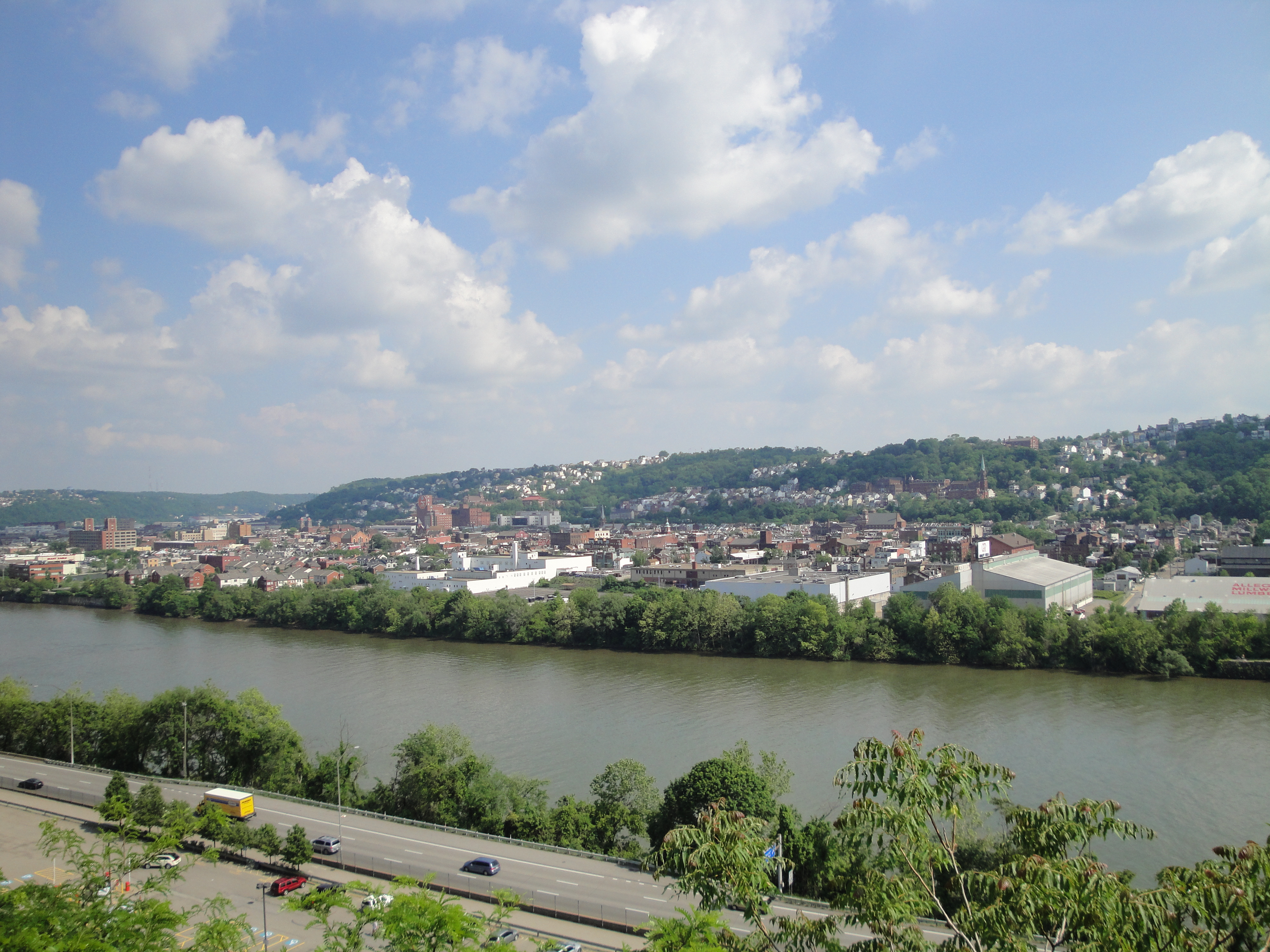
Present Day Photo of the South Side in Pittsburgh, Pennsylvania

After receiving the land grant, John Ormsby married Jane McAllister in July 1764. The couple moved to Bedford, Pennsylvania, where Ormsby opened a trading store. The Ormsbys started their family on their 300-acre (120 ha) farm in Bedford, but in 1770 they returned to Pittsburgh, where Ormsby had land and business interests.

This land stretched from the present-day Smithfield Street Bridge to Becks Run Road along the Monongahela River; Ormsby called it Homestead Farms. In 1773, Ormsby received a license to operate a ferry across the Monongahela River, which connected Pittsburgh with his estates in what is now called the South Side. He operated this ferry, the first in Pittsburgh, until he sold it in 1789. He also established a brickyard and boatyard near his estate. This ferry was later operated by John Patch and served as a contributor to the development and culture of the area in centuries following.

Dr. Nathaniel Bedford married John Ormsby's daughter Jane, and in 1811 Bedford "laid out a town on the flats extending from the south side of the Monongahela River. Although Bedford named the town Birmingham in tribute to his native city," he named four of the streets after the daughters of John Ormsby - Jane, Sarah, Mary, and Sidney. This area is now known as the South Side.

== Death ==
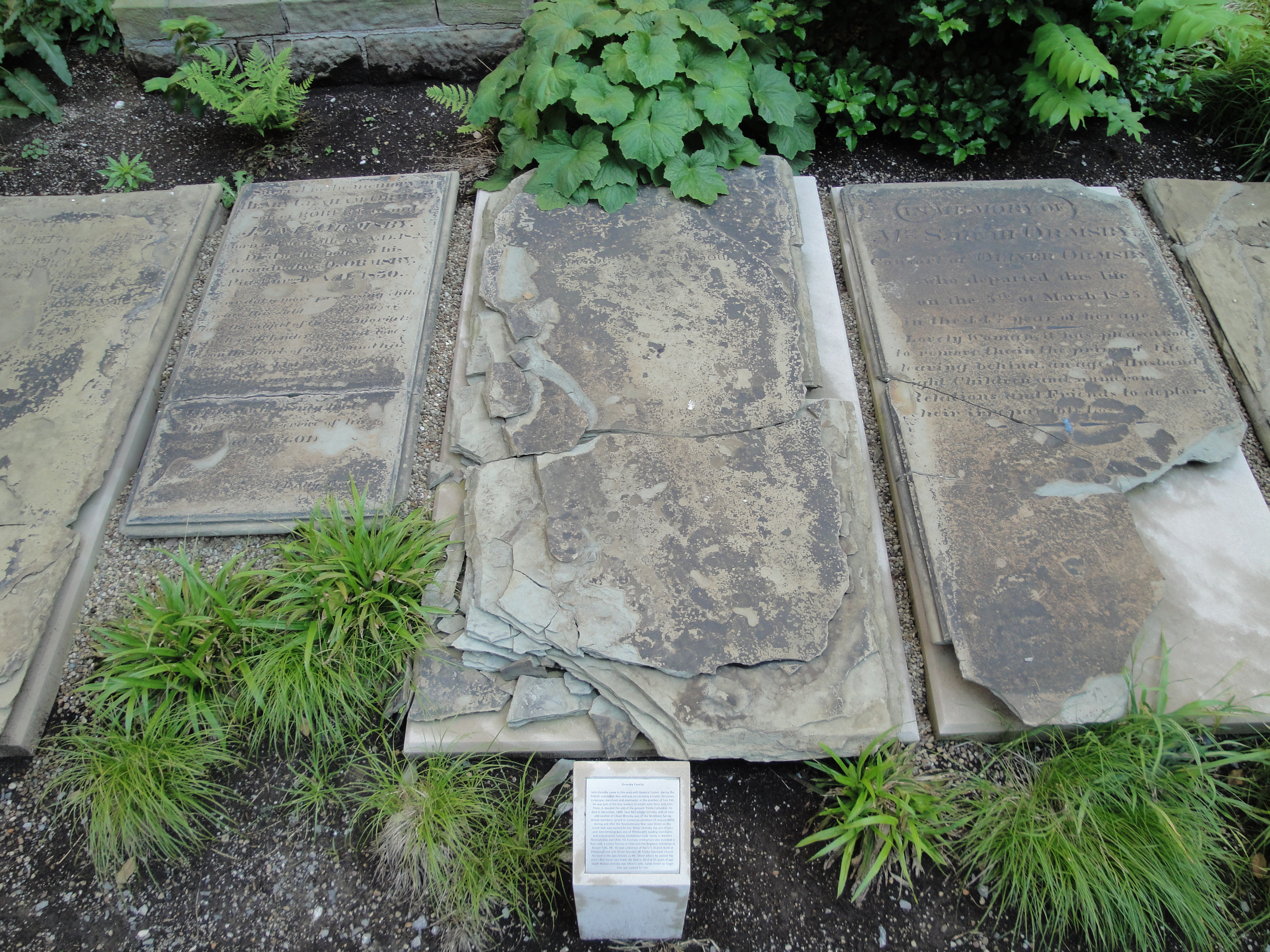
John Ormsby's Burial Site at Trinity Churchyard in Pittsburgh

John Ormsby died intestate in Allegheny County, Pennsylvania, in December 1805. He is buried in Trinity Churchyard in downtown Pittsburgh. In September 1840 a lawsuit was filed against Sidney Gregg, a descendant of Oliver and John Ormsby, for the land that had been John Ormsby's until his death and then Oliver's after John's death. The case was seen by the judge due to complications of death intestate, but the land remained in the ownership of the Ormsby descendants by the court's decision.

== Memorials and legacy ==
Ormsby Avenue in Mount Oliver, Pennsylvania, is named for John and his family. Mount Oliver itself is named after John's son, Oliver. Located off East Carson Street, on 22nd Street, is a baseball field which bears his name.
