= Mount Oliver Incline =

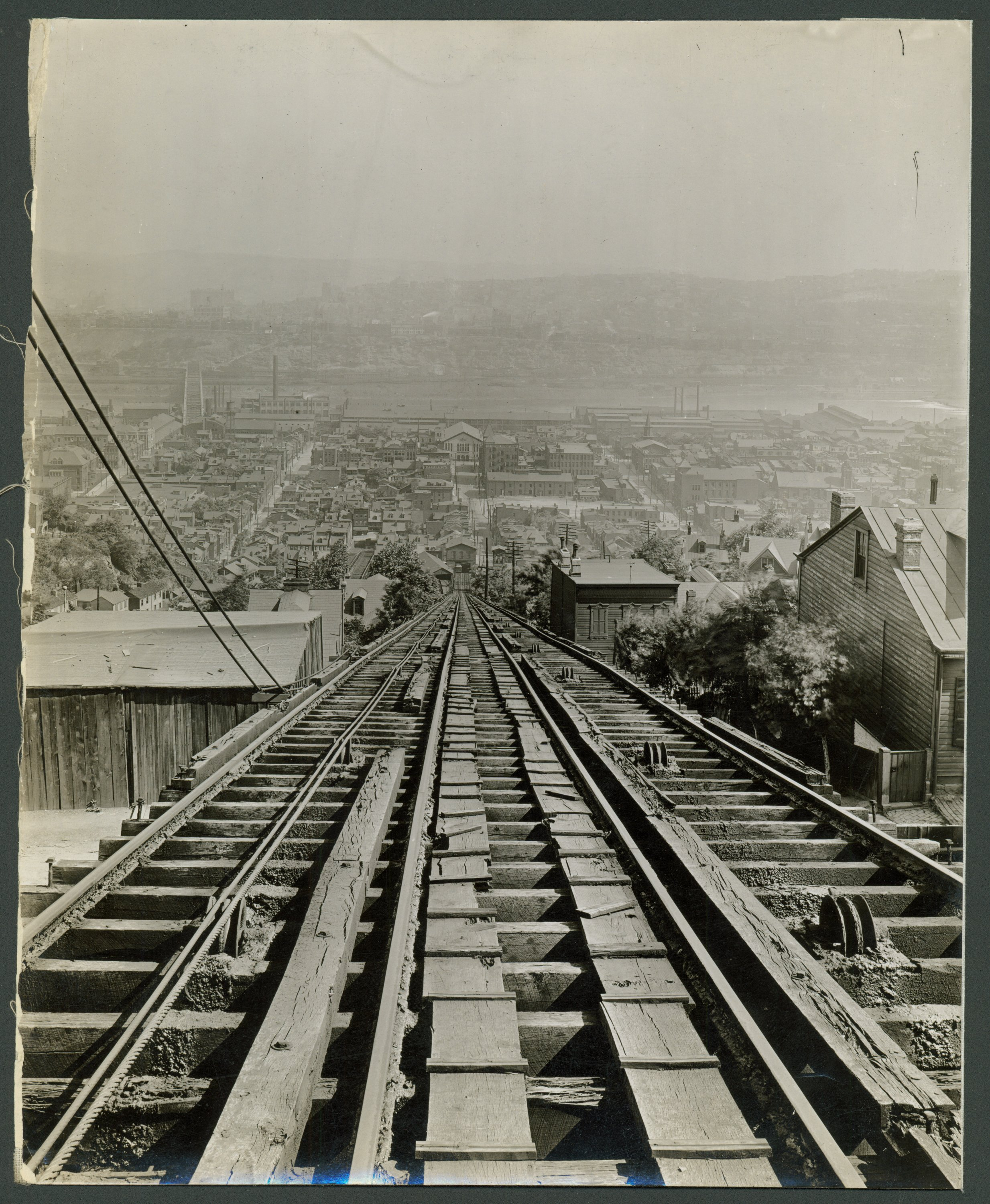

Overview
- Locale: South Side, Pittsburgh, Pennsylvania
- Coordinates: 40.4244°N 79.9864°W

History
- Opened: 1872
- Closed: 6 July 1951

Technical
- Line length: 1,600 feet (490 m)

The Mount Oliver Incline was a funicular on the South Side of Pittsburgh, Pennsylvania. It was designed in 1871 by the Prussian-born engineer John Endres and his American daughter Caroline Endres, one of the first women engineers in the United States.

Its track was 1600 feet long and gained 377 feet of elevation. It ran from the corner of Freyburg and South Twelfth streets at its lower end to Warrington Avenue at its upper end. It was closed on 6 July 1951.

== See also ==
- Knoxville Incline
- List of funicular railways
- List of inclines in Pittsburgh
- Pittsburgh, Knoxville & St. Clair Electric Railroad
