= Smithfield Street Bridge =

Bridge in Pittsburgh, Pennsylvania

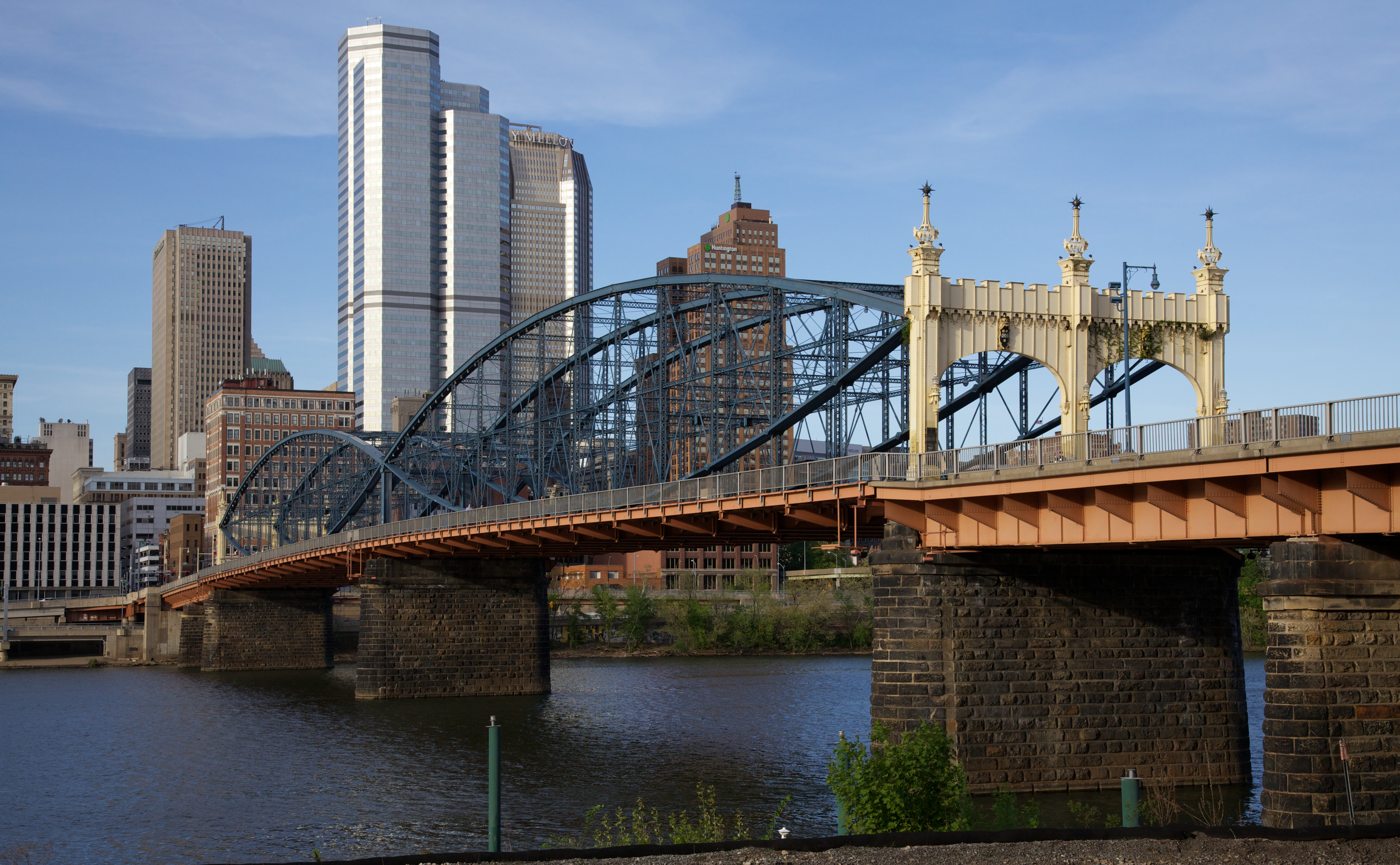
- Smithfield Street Bridge
- Coordinates: 40°26′5″N 80°0′8″W
- Carries: 4 lanes of roadway 2 pedestrian walkways
- Crosses: Monongahela River
- Locale: Pittsburgh, Pennsylvania

Characteristics
- Design: Lenticular truss bridge
- Total length: 1,184 feet (361 m)
- Longest span: 2 spans, 360 feet (110 m) each
- Clearance below: 42.5 feet (13.0 m)

History
- Opened: March 19, 1883
- Smithfield Street Bridge
- U.S. National Register of Historic Places
- U.S. National Historic Landmark
- City of Pittsburgh Historic Structure
- Pittsburgh Landmark – PHLF
- Area: 1 acre (0.40 ha)
- Architect: Gustav Lindenthal
- Architectural style: Romanesque, Pauli truss
- NRHP reference No.: 74001745

Significant dates
- Added to NRHP: March 21, 1974
- Designated NHL: May 11, 1976
- Designated CPHS: February 22, 1977
- Designated PHLF: 1970

Location
- Interactive map of Smithfield Street Bridge

The Smithfield Street Bridge is a lenticular truss bridge crossing the Monongahela River in Pittsburgh, Pennsylvania, United States. The bridge was designed by Gustav Lindenthal, the engineer who later designed the Hell Gate Bridge in New York City. The Smithfield Street Bridge was built between 1881 and 1883, opening for traffic on March 19, 1883. It was widened in 1889 and widened again in 1911. The bridge has been designated a National Historic Civil Engineering Landmark, a National Historic Landmark, and has a Historic Landmark Plaque from the Pittsburgh History and Landmarks Foundation.

== History ==
The present bridge is the third bridge at the site. It remains the second oldest steel bridge in the United States. In 1818, a wooden bridge was built across the Monongahela by Louis Wernwag at the cost of $102,000. This bridge was destroyed in Pittsburgh's Great Fire of 1845. The second bridge on the site was a wire rope suspension bridge built by John A. Roebling. Increases in bridge traffic and river traffic eventually made the lightly built bridge with eight short spans inadequate. The Lindenthal bridge was built in its place, using the Roebling bridge's stone masonry piers.

The Smithfield Street Bridge is the penultimate of the many bridges that span the Monongahela before the river joins the Allegheny River to form the Ohio River at Downtown Pittsburgh. Only the Fort Pitt Bridge is farther downstream.

The bridge also served the Pittsburgh Railways streetcar system with lines coming from the Mt. Washington Transit Tunnel and from Carson Street, crossing the bridge and continuing into downtown along Grant Street and Smithfield Street, returning to the bridge via Wood Street or Grant Street. The tracks occupied the eastern half of the bridge. The streetcar line was abandoned in July 1985, when the streetcars were diverted to the Panhandle Bridge and the new light rail subway, on July 7. The last day of streetcar service on downtown Pittsburgh streets and over the Smithfield Street Bridge was July 6, 1985, although the final crossing of the bridge by a streetcar did not take place until 1:40 a.m. on July 7. The former streetcar right-of-way was converted into a paved roadway for northbound traffic.

The bridge was listed on the National Register of Historic Places on March 21, 1974. Two years later, on May 11, 1976, it was designated a National Historic Landmark.

The bridge's short clearance from the river and its deteriorated condition convinced PennDOT officials to demolish and replace it with a modern bridge. Officials considered lobbying by the Pittsburgh History and Landmarks Foundation on preserving the bridge. In 1994–1995 the bridge was rehabilitated with a new deck, a colorful paint scheme, and architectural lighting. The abandoned rail lines became an extra traffic lane, and a light-controlled bus lane was added during peak traffic hours. The bridge is the Monongahela crossing most heavily walked by pedestrians, mostly commuters who park at Station Square.

The bridge connects Smithfield Street in Downtown Pittsburgh with Station Square.

== Gallery ==
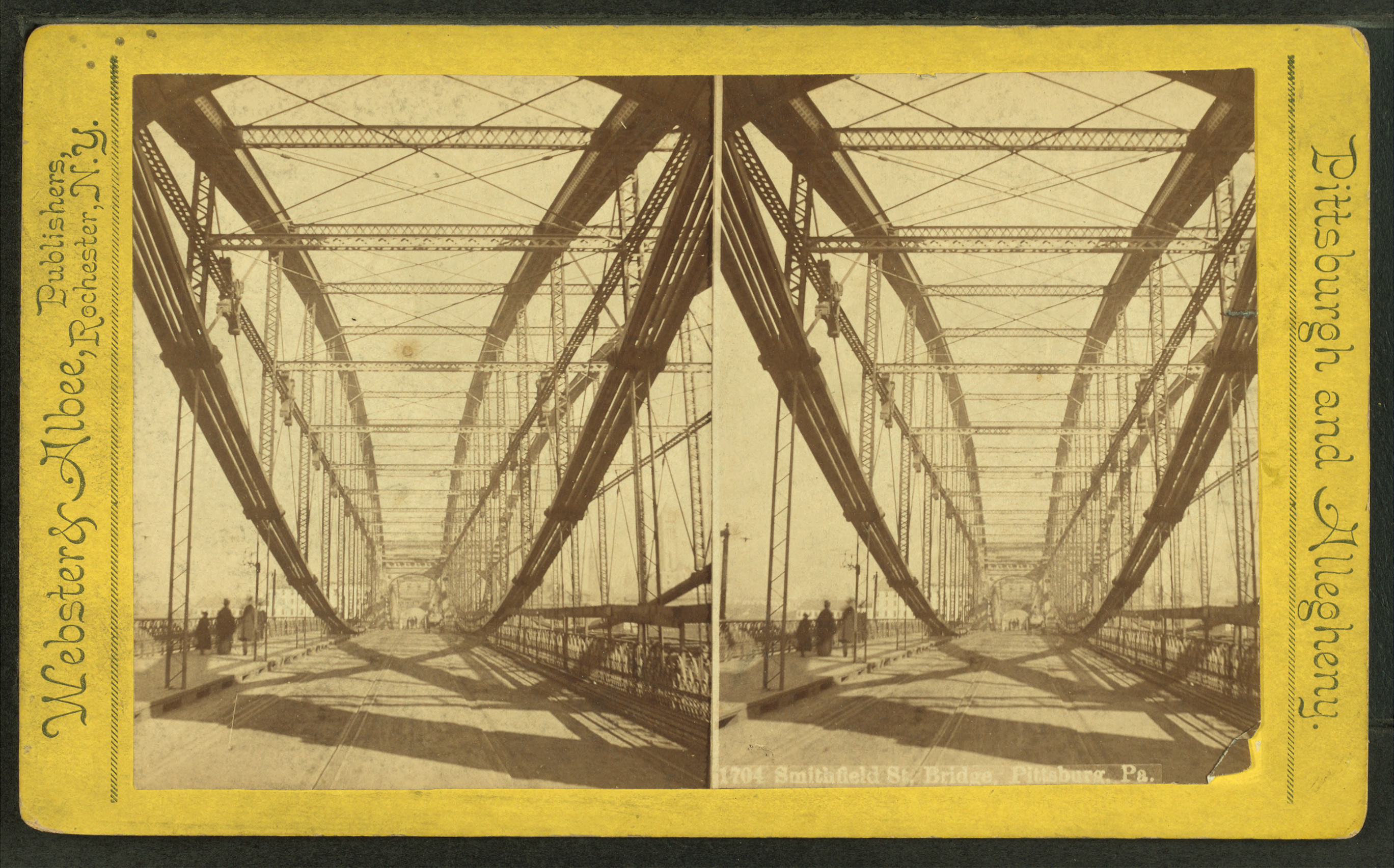
An early stereoscopic view of the bridge

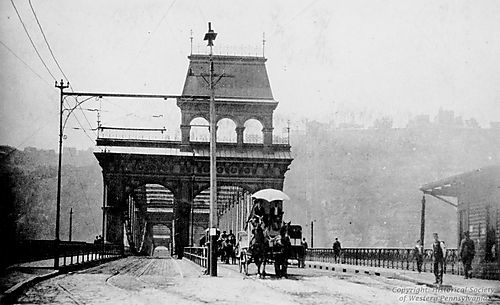
Photograph of the Smithfield Street Bridge in 1894

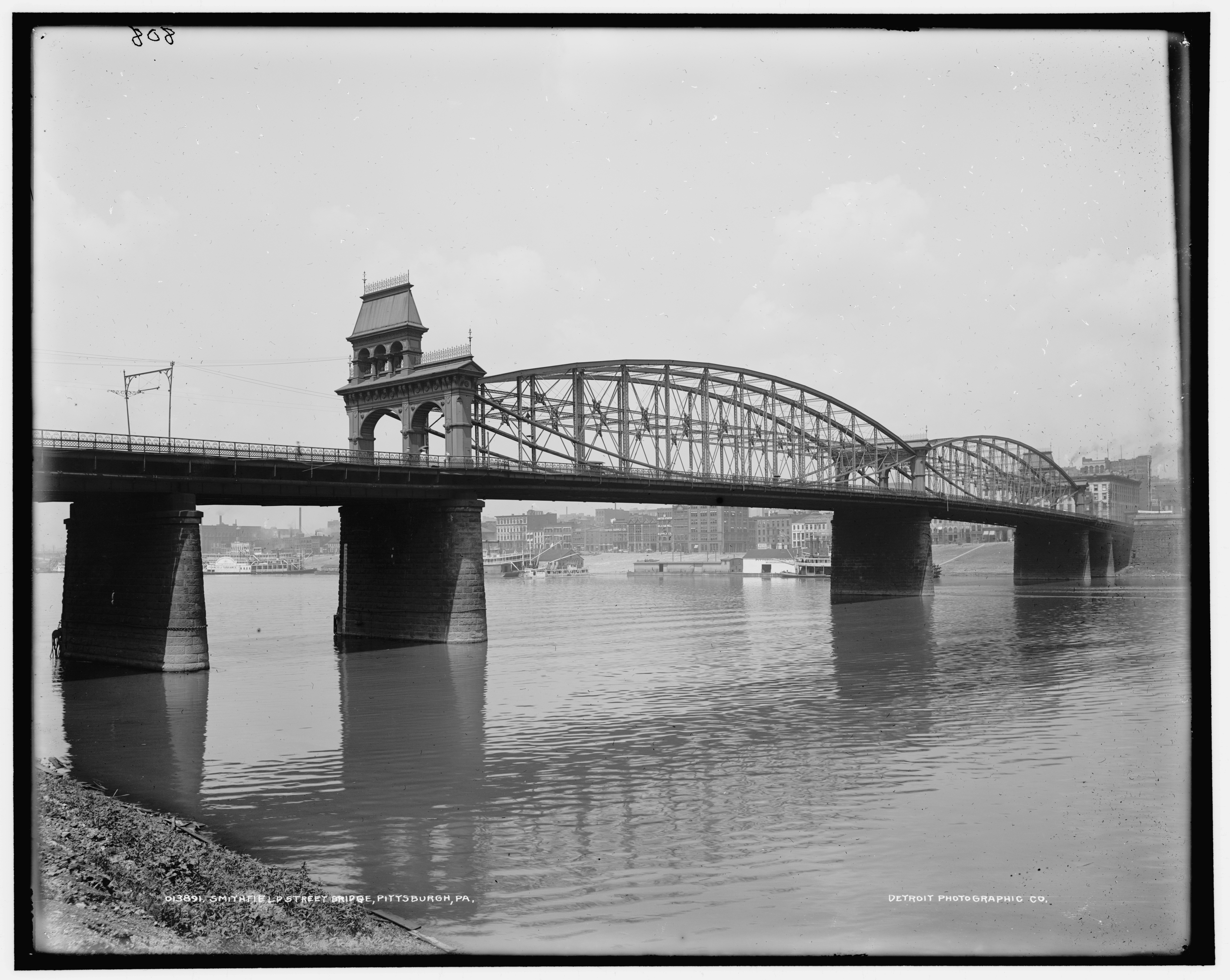
The bridge around 1900

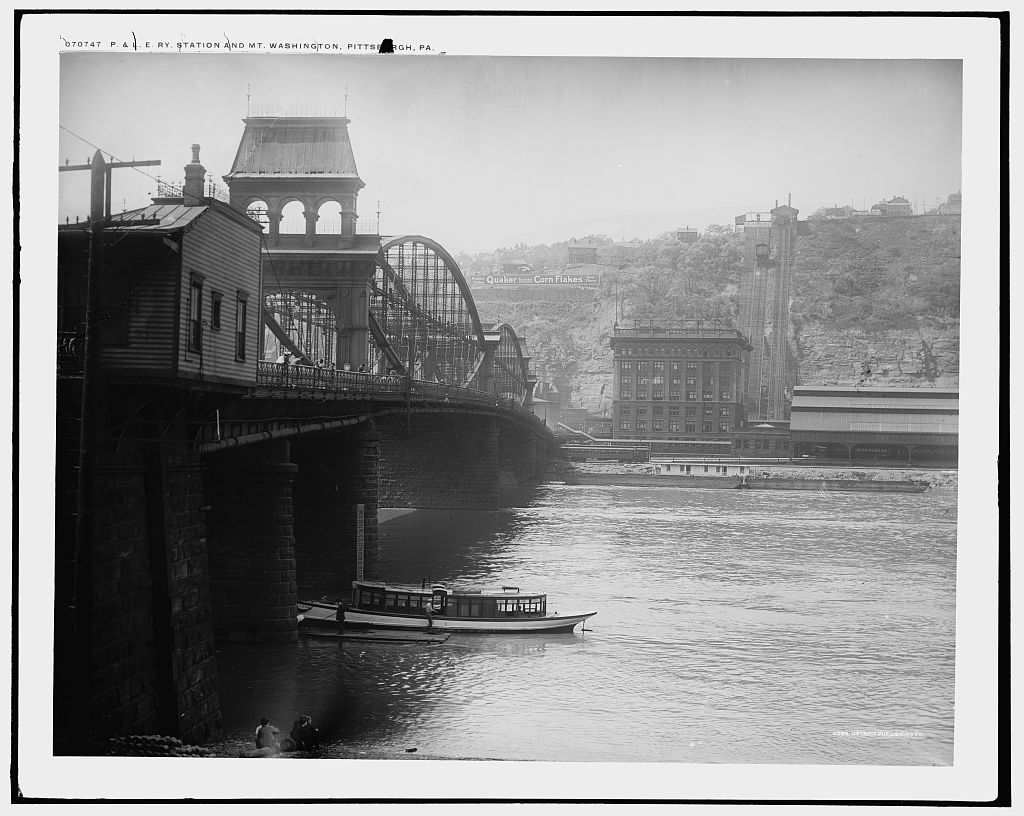
The bridge around 1905

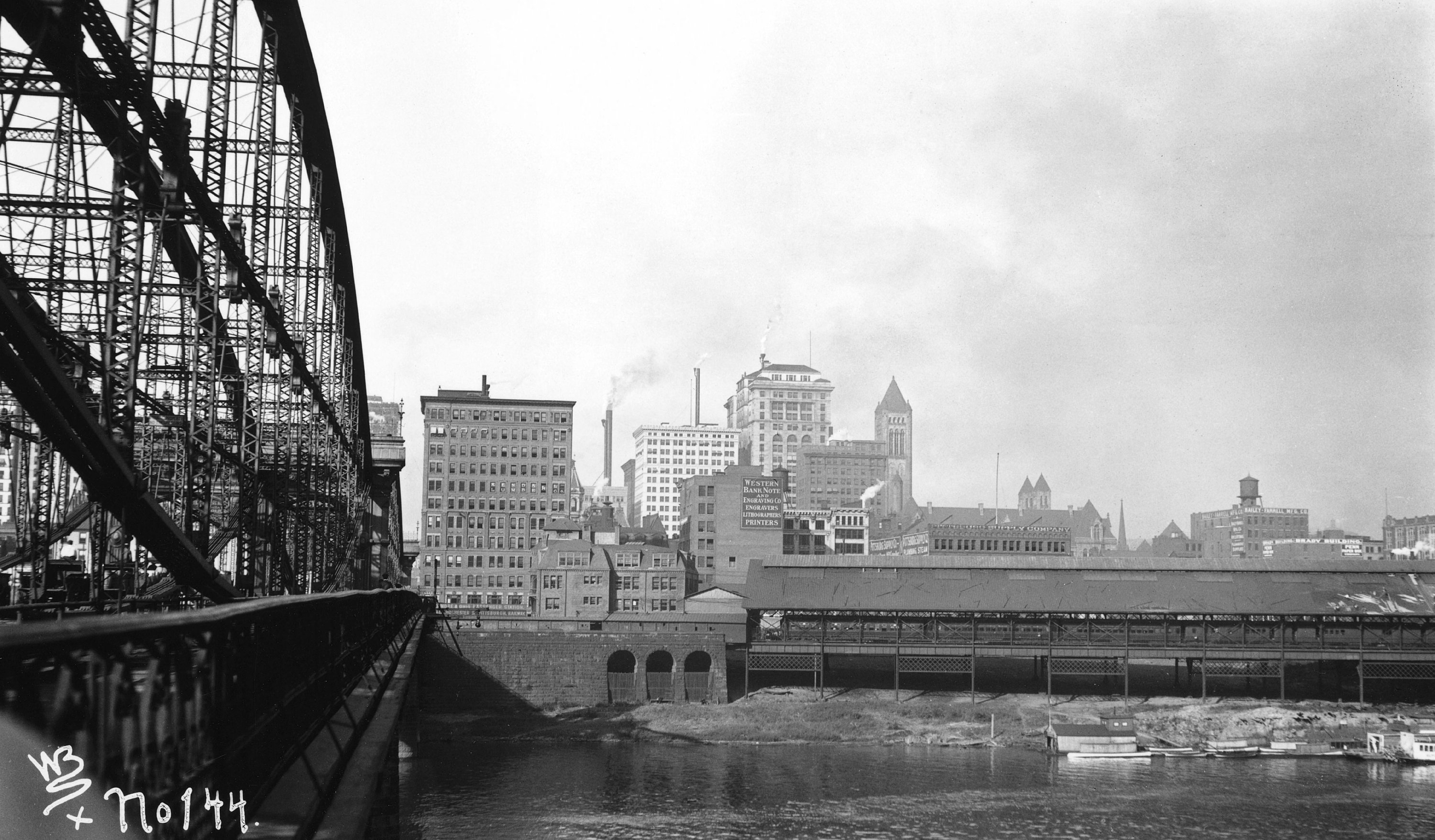
A view of the bridge structure from around 1906

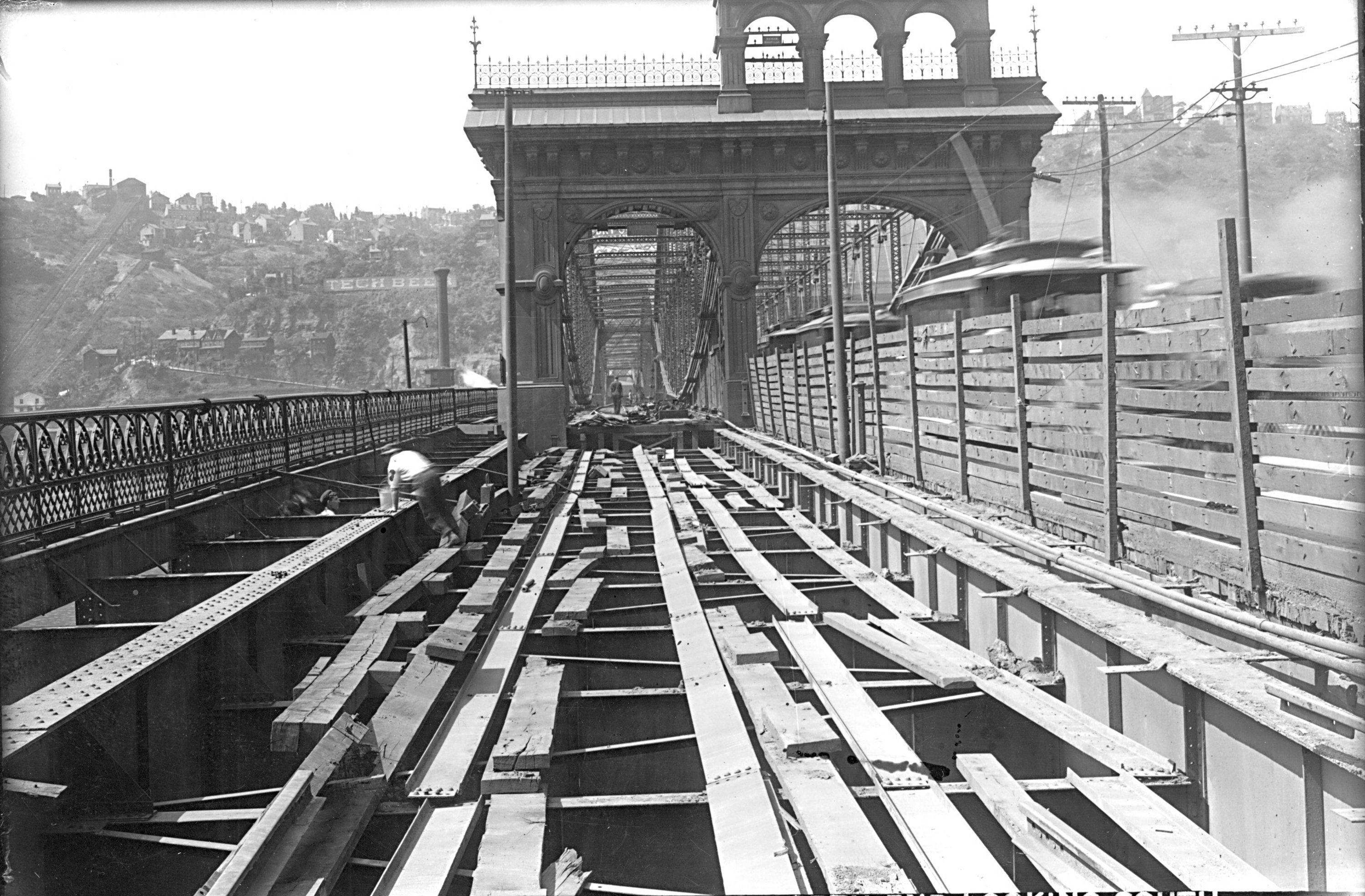
The bridge in 1911, during the second widening

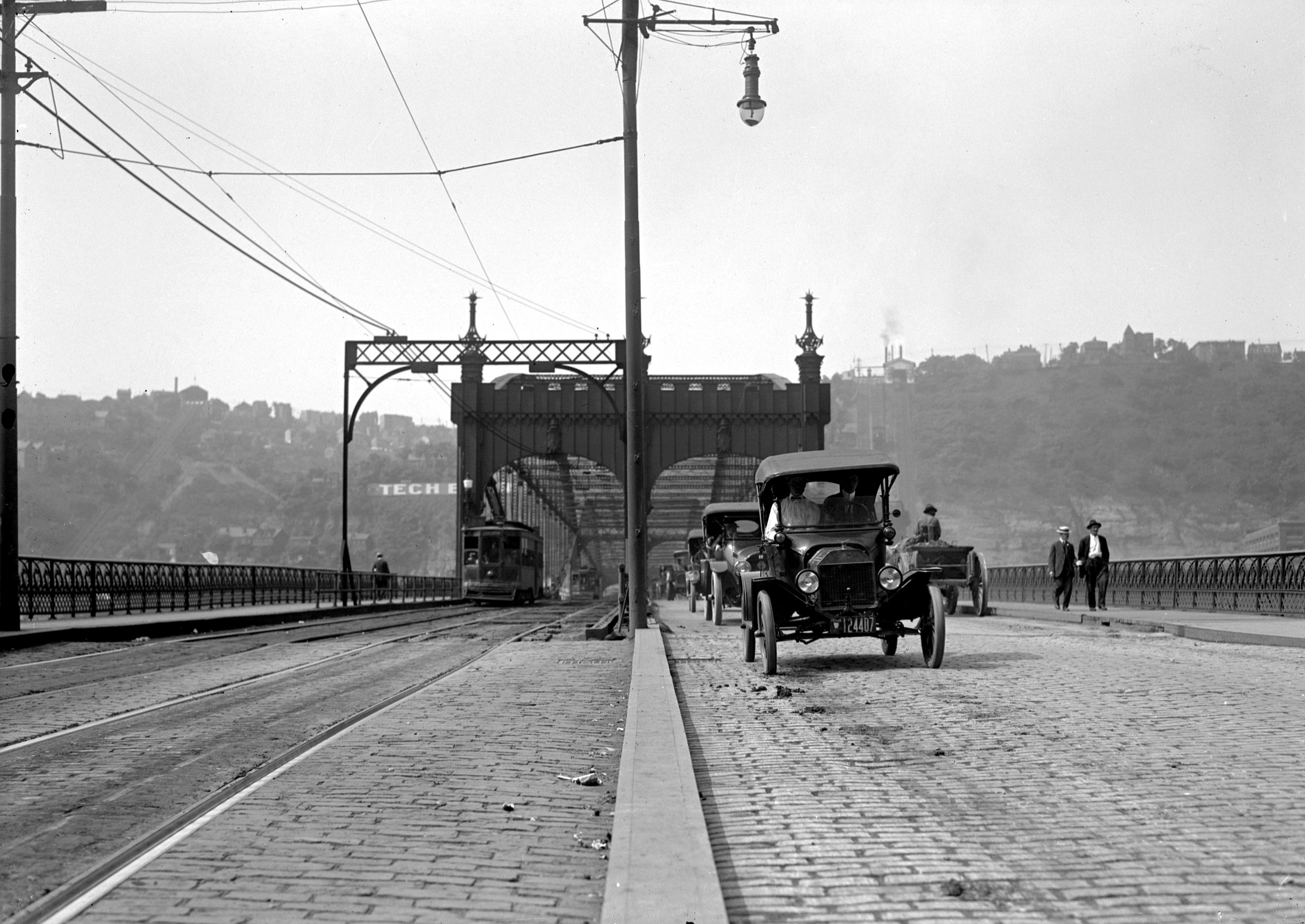
Traffic on the bridge in 1917

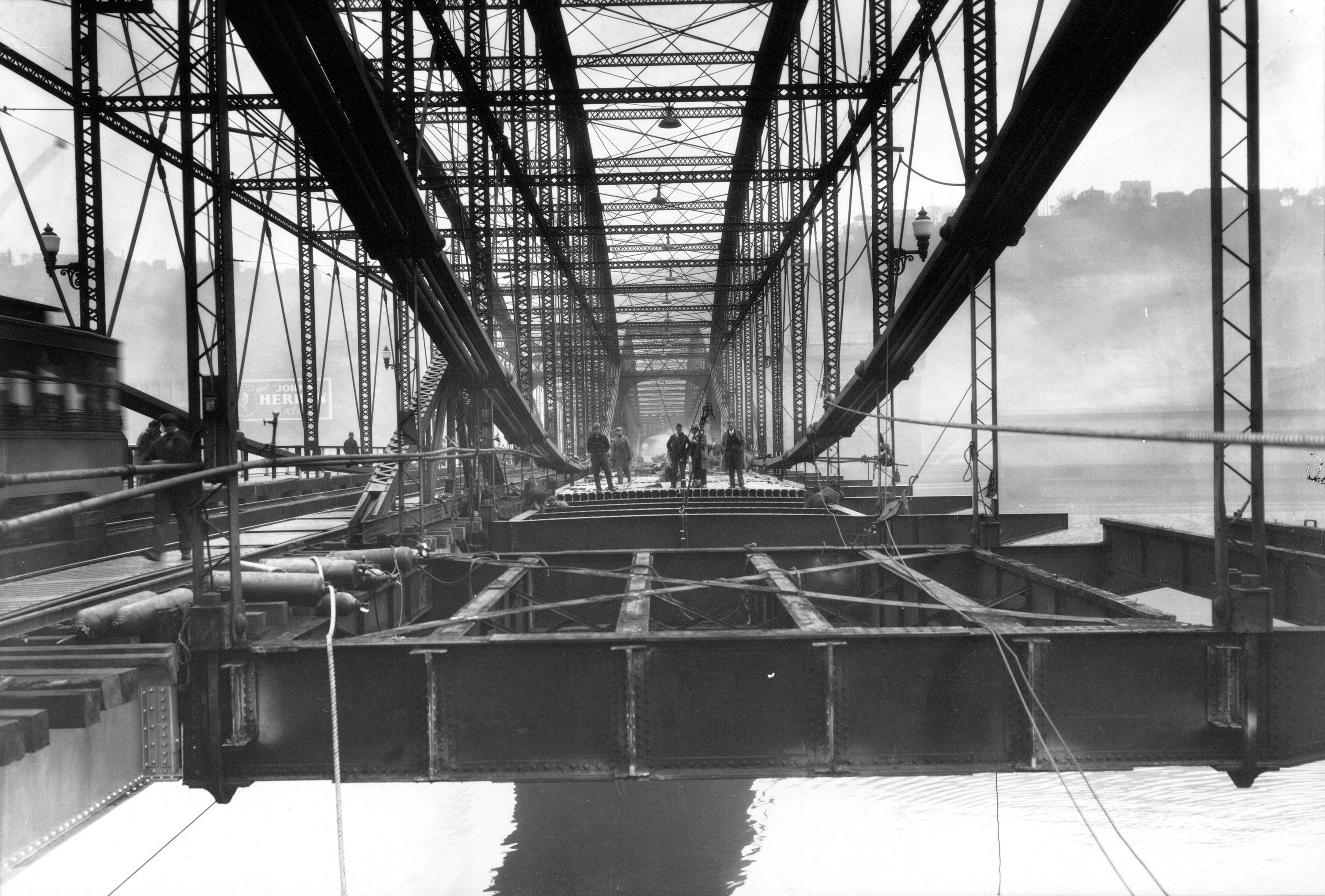
Construction on the bridge, 1933

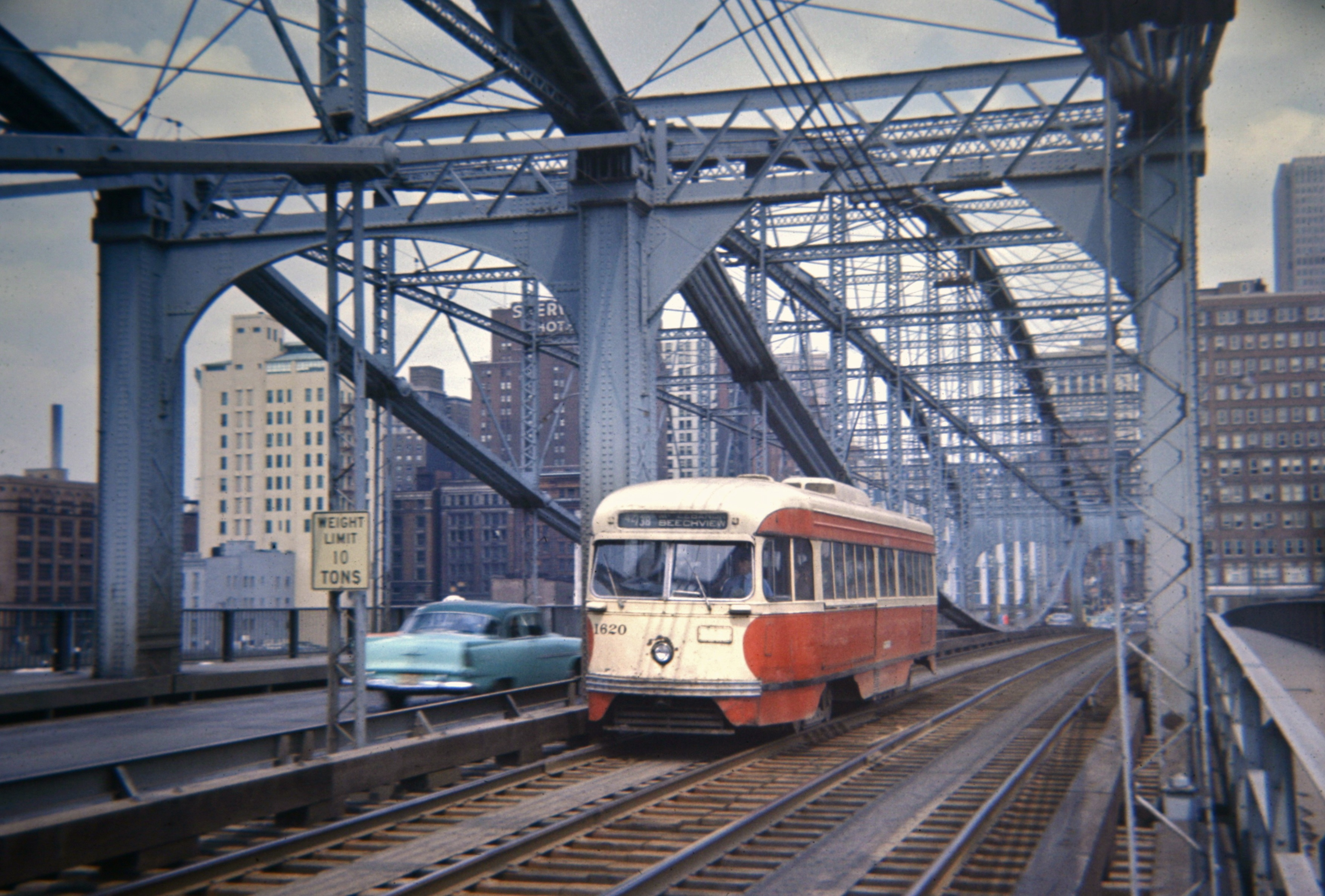
A streetcar crossing the bridge in 1966, southbound

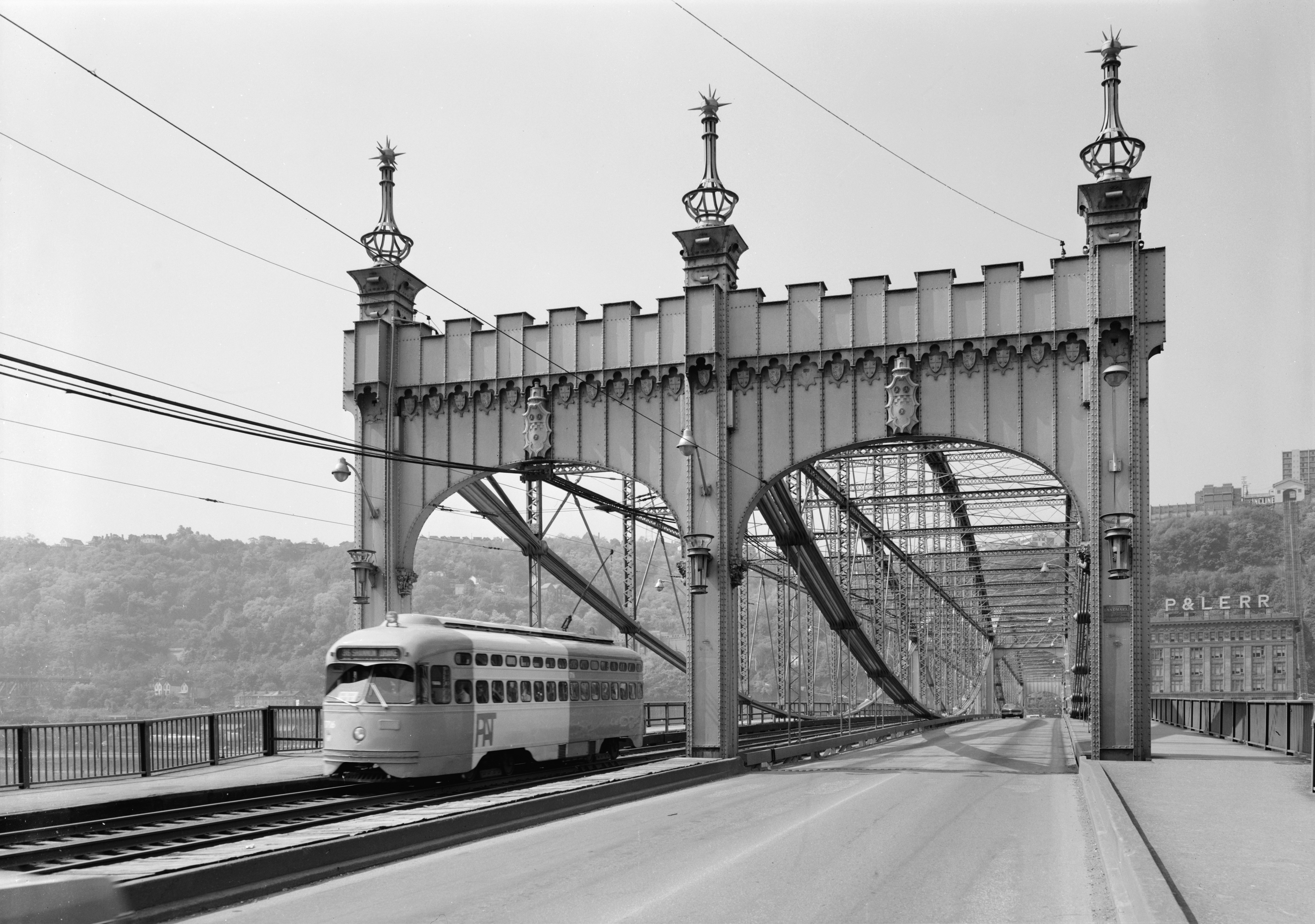
The bridge in 1974

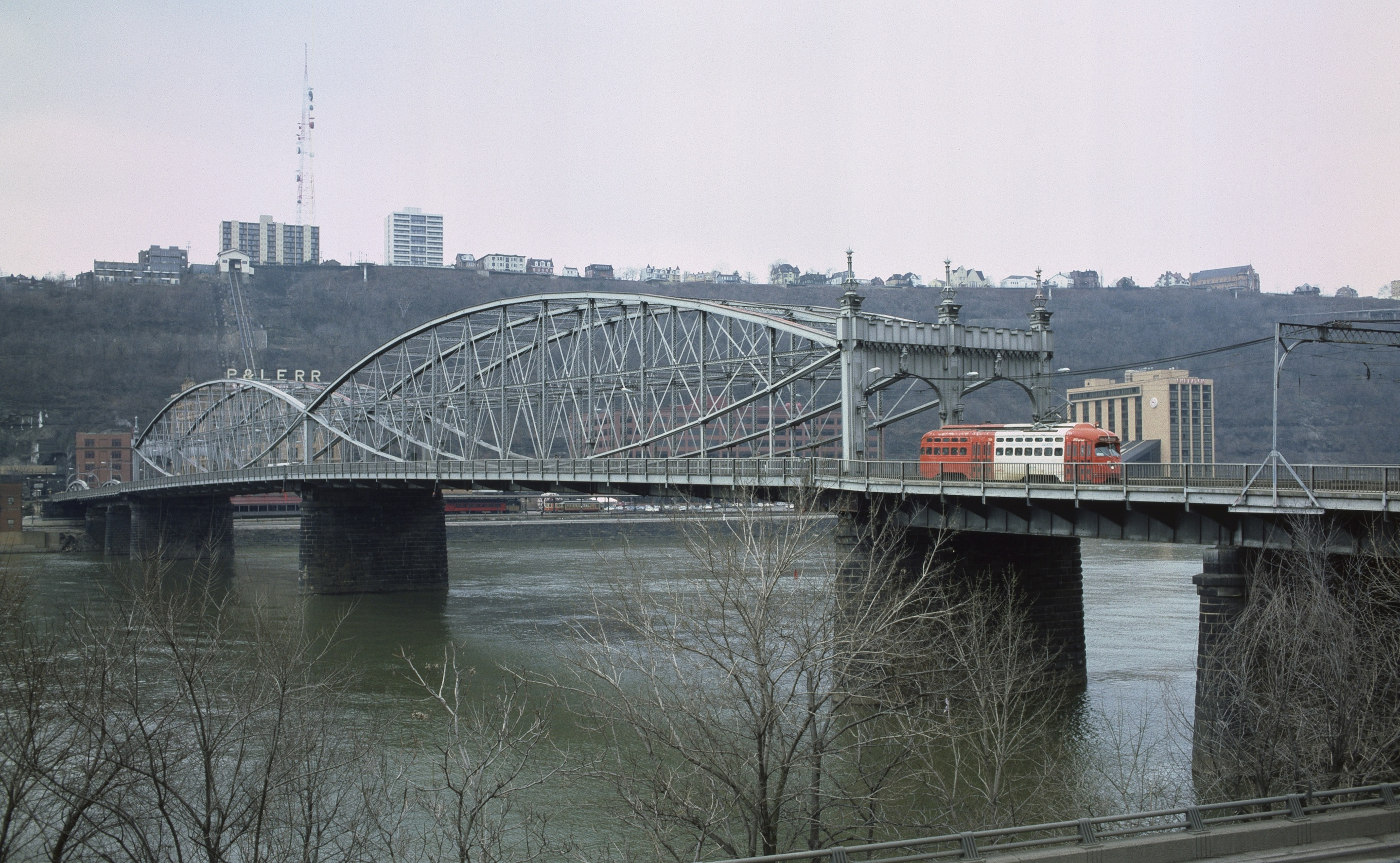
View from downtown in 1984, with a streetcar leaving the bridge

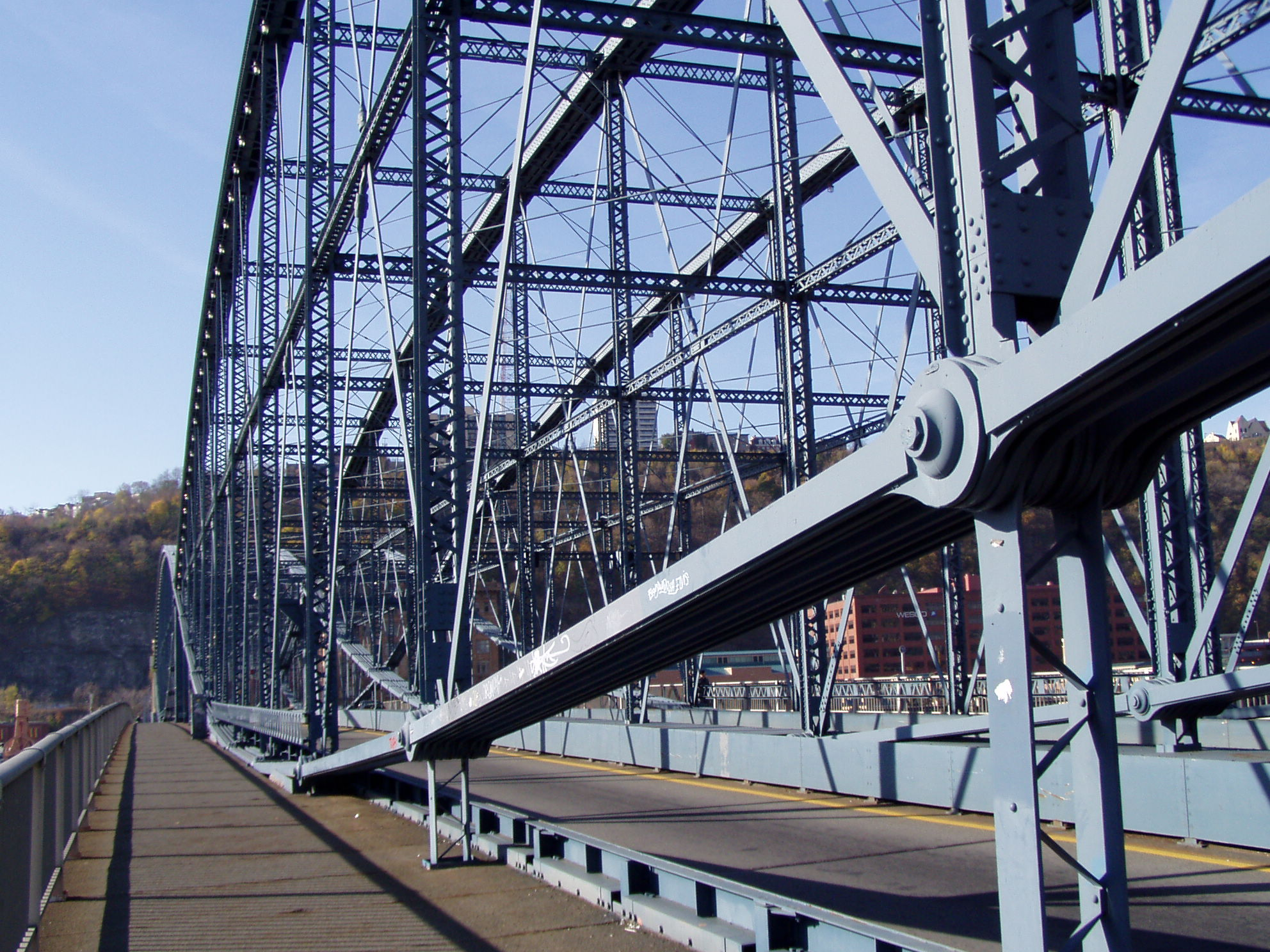
Detail of the ironwork on the Smithfield Street Bridge, looking south

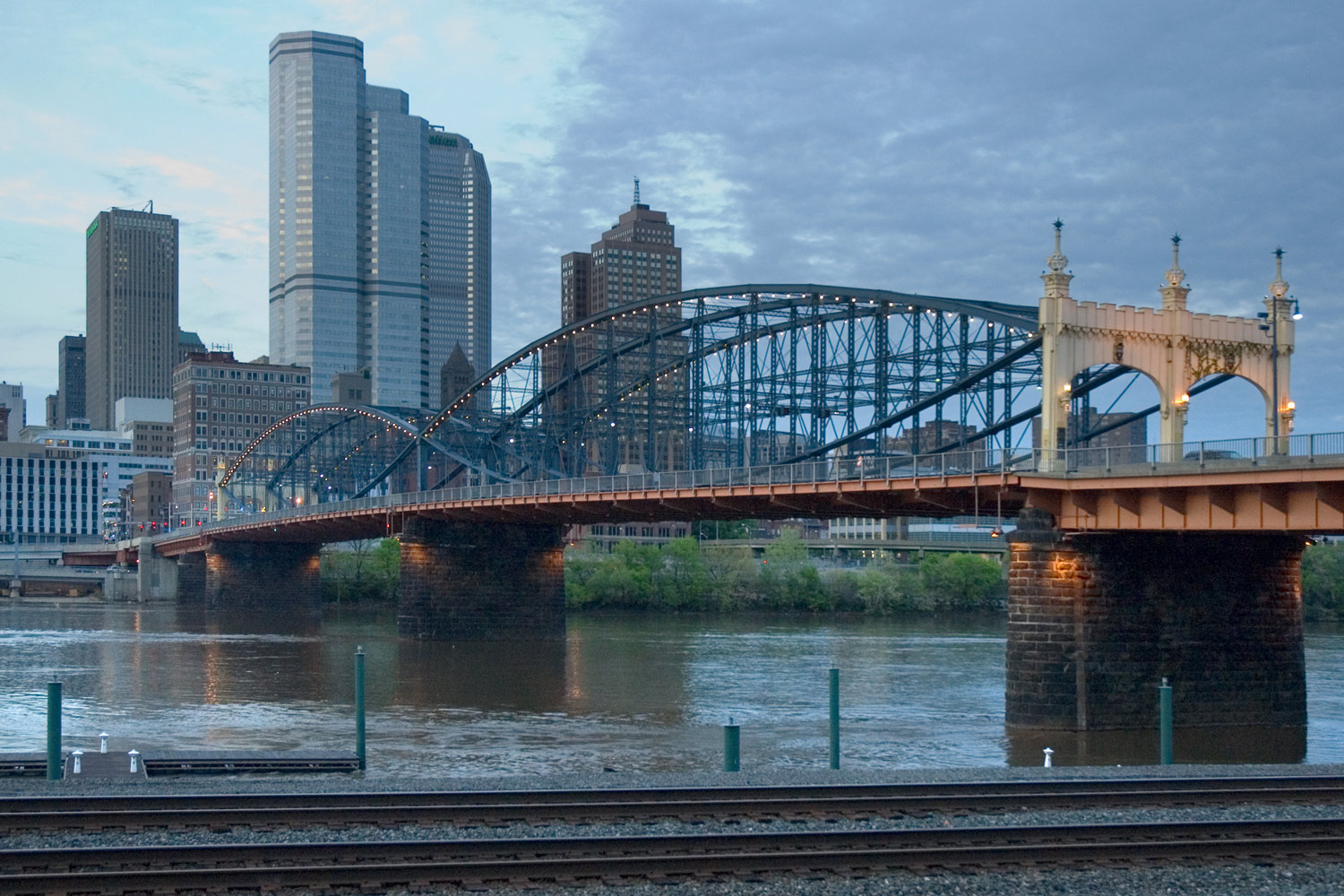
The Smithfield Bridge at dusk

North end, in the 2000s

== Popular culture ==
The bridge is featured in the 1993 Bruce Willis film Striking Distance, the opening scene of the 1983 film Flashdance and the 2010 rap video Black and Yellow.

== See also ==
- List of bridges documented by the Historic American Engineering Record in Pennsylvania
- List of crossings of the Monongahela River
- Mount Washington Transit Tunnel
- Baltimore and Ohio Station (Pittsburgh)
