= South Park (disambiguation) =

South Park is an American animated television series.

South Park may also refer to:

== South Park franchise ==
- South Park (film series), a film series originating with the television series:
  - South Park: Bigger, Longer & Uncut, a 1999 full-length feature film
  - South Park: Post COVID, a 2021 television film
  - South Park: Post COVID: The Return of COVID, a sequel to the 2021 television film South Park: Post COVID
  - South Park: The Streaming Wars, a 2022 television film
  - South Park: The Streaming Wars Part 2, a sequel to the 2022 television film South Park: The Streaming Wars
  - South Park: Joining the Panderverse, a 2023 American animated television special
  - South Park (Not Suitable for Children), a 2023 American animated television special
  - South Park: The End of Obesity, a 2024 American animated television special
- South Park (franchise), a media franchise originating with the television series, including:
  - South Park (video game), a 1998 first-person shooter game
  - South Park: Chef's Luv Shack, a 1999 game-show style video game
  - South Park: The Stick of Truth, a 2014 role-playing video game
  - South Park: The Fractured but Whole, a 2017 sequel to the 2014 video game South Park: The Stick of Truth
  - South Park: Snow Day!, a 2024 action-adventure game
  - South Park Rally, a 2000 racing video game
  - South Park (pinball), a 1999 pinball game

== Places ==
=== Ireland ===
- South Park, an area in Galway

=== United Kingdom ===
- South Park, Fulham, city park in west London
- South Park, Ilford, area in East London
- South Park, Oxford, a city park in Oxford
- Southpark Village, an estate in Glasgow

=== United States ===
- South Park Historic District (disambiguation)

==== California ====
- South Park, Los Angeles, a residential neighborhood in South Los Angeles, California
- South Park (Downtown Los Angeles), a residential and commercial neighborhood
- South Park, San Diego, one of the major historic Urban Communities of San Diego
- South Park, San Francisco, a neighborhood and a city park in San Francisco, California
- South Park, Santa Rosa, California, a neighborhood in Santa Rosa, California

==== Colorado ====
- South Park, a historical name for Alamo Square Park, Colorado Springs
- South Park (Saguache County, Colorado), a geologic flat near Mount Lion in the La Garita Mountains
- South Park National Heritage Area
  - South Park (Park County, Colorado), a broad, flat valley surrounded by mountains
    - South Park City, alternate name of the town of Fairplay, Colorado in Park County
      - South Park City, a museum in Fairplay
- South Park Railroad, the nickname name for the Denver, South Park and Pacific Railroad

==== Illinois ====
- Dr. Martin Luther King Jr. Drive, formerly South Park Way
  - King Drive station, formerly South Park

==== Indiana ====
- South Park, Indiana

==== Kentucky ====
- South Park, Louisville, Kentucky

==== New York ====
- Cazenovia Park-South Park System, Buffalo, New York, listed on the NRHP in 1982

==== North Carolina ====
- SouthPark, Charlotte, North Carolina

==== Ohio ====
- South Park (RTA Rapid Transit station), Cleveland, Ohio
- South Park Historic District (Dayton, Ohio)
- South Park Site, a prehistoric site of the Whittlesey culture on the National Register of Historic Places

==== Oregon ====
- South Park Blocks, a city park in downtown Portland, Oregon

==== Pennsylvania ====
- South Park (PAT station), Bethel Park, Pennsylvania
- South Park (Pittsburgh)
- South Park Township, Pennsylvania
  - South Park School District, Allegheny County, Pennsylvania

==== Texas ====
- South Park, Houston, Texas

==== Washington ====
- South Park, Seattle

==== West Virginia ====
- South Park, a neighborhood in Morgantown, West Virginia

==== Wyoming ====
- South Park, Wyoming

== Other uses ==
- South Park F.C., a non-league football club in England
- South Park Bridge, a bridge in Seattle, Washington, United States
- South Park Hospital (nicknamed Sparky's), a fictional hospital used as the setting for the UK children's TV show Children's Ward
- South Park Settlement, a settlement house in San Francisco, California, United States

== See also ==
- South Park Mall (disambiguation)
- Southern Park (disambiguation)
