= Itschak Shrem =

Israeli businessman

- יִצְחַק שְׁרֵם
- Born: 1947 (age 78–79); Tel-Aviv, Mandatory Palestine
- Occupation: Investor

Itschak Shrem (Hebrew: יִצְחַק שְׁרֵם; born 1947) is an Israeli businessman.

He is currently the Chairman of the Board of Nano Dimension Ltd, a 3D printers for a printed circuit board company; he also chairs a hedge fund, and is a board member of Sphera Global Healthcare.

== Education ==
Itschak Shrem was born in Tel Aviv. He holds a B.A. in Economics from Bar-Ilan University and an M.B.A. from Tel Aviv University. He is married and has four children.

== Career ==
Shrem started his professional life working in Clal Israel LTD – an Israeli conglomerate – holding various capacities, including Chief Operating Officer in charge of the group’s capital markets and insurance businesses. He established Clal Insurance, the largest insurance company in Israel that in 2015 constituted 25% of the Israeli insurance market.

In 1991 he left Clal and established Dovrat Shrem, a private investment house, and the brokerage DS Investments Ltd which later merged with Meitav Dash.

In 1993, he founded Pitango Venture Capital Fund, that over the years invested mainly in the technology industry and managed in 2016 more than 2 billion dollars.

In 2002, Shrem established four technology funds in Canada.

In 2004, he established Sphera Hedge Fund, that in 2015 managed 1 billion dollars in assets, and he is still a part of the General Partner.

In 2005, Shrem was selected by the Korean Ministry of Communications to manage a 100 million dollars fund, investing in Israel and in Korea, together with a local partner. In this year Shrem, along with an Israeli partner, established a Venture Capital Fund with major investments in Singapore and in Korea. That year he also established a partnership with Marubeni, a multibillion-dollar holding company in Japan.

Other positions:

Shrem served on the board of directors of Ormat Industries Ltd (Listed on TASE) and Retalix Ltd, until it was sold for approximately 1 billion dollars to NCR, a NASDAQ listed company.

He was also Chairman of the Board at Shrem Fudim Group Ltd, Leader Holdings and Investments Ltd, an acting director of Greenstone Industries Ltd and Polar Communications Ltd, a board member of the Israeli Stock Exchange in Tel Aviv and of Eden Springs Ltd, both listed in TASE.

== Philanthropy ==
In the last few years Shrem served as a director in the Israeli Philharmonic Orchestra, and as a board member of the Tel Aviv Sourasky Medical Foundation, Weizmann Institute of Science and the Herzliya Interdisciplinary Center. He is also active in several other charity organizations, and an avid arts' supporter.
