= Southpark Mall =

Southpark Mall or South Park Mall may refer to:

- SouthPark Mall (Illinois)
- SouthPark Mall (North Carolina)
- South Park Mall (Louisiana)
- SouthPark Mall (Ohio)
- South Park Mall (Texas)
- Southpark Mall (Virginia)

== See also ==
- South Park (disambiguation)
- Southern Park Mall
