= Nuti (surname) =

Nuti is a surname. Notable people with the surname include:

- Andrea Nuti (born 1967), Italian sprinter
- Bill Nuti (born 1964), American businessman
- Francesco Nuti (born 1955), Italian actor, film director, and screenwriter
- Giovanni Nuti (born 1998), Italian football player
- Wanda Nuti, Italian gymnast
