= Southern Park =

Southern Park is the name of:

- Southern Park F.C., South African soccer club
- Southern Park Mall, shopping mall in Boardman, Ohio
- Southern National Park, national park in South Sudan
- Southern Park, Tampere, a park in Tampere, Finland

== See also ==
- South Park (disambiguation)
