= NCR Silver =

NCR Silver is a tablet-based point-of-sale system sold by NCR. The system was created in 2012 to target the small business market.

NCR Silver is an app available on iOS devices such as iPad and iPhone. It's also available on a closed Android point-of-sale (POS) system called Silver Register. Free to download, restaurateurs and retailers pay a monthly subscription fee that includes features such as integrated loyalty, email marketing, reporting, live support and more.

== NCR Silver products and services ==
In addition to POS apps, NCR Silver offers services, hardware and third-party software add-on choices. As credit processing is needed to take card payments, NCR Silver allows merchants to choose their own payment processor.

In 2016, NCR Silver launched live 24/7 customer support, POS back office set-up, and monthly menu maintenance as part of an ongoing effort to transition into an "added-value services provider."

Hardware offered includes credit card readers, EMV chip readers, wireless printer, barcode scanner, integrated scale and more. The system also integrates with various third-party software providers including QuickBooks, Xero, and LevelUp.
