= Oliver Miller Homestead =

Historic house in Pennsylvania, United States

- James Miller House
- U.S. National Register of Historic Places
- Pittsburgh Landmark – PHLF
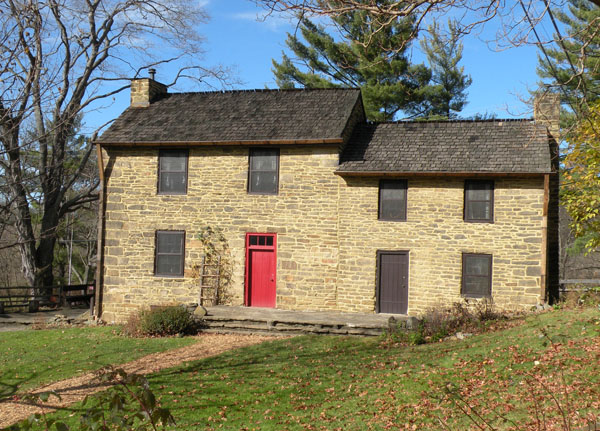

- Location within Pennsylvania Location within the United States
- Location: South Park Township, Pennsylvania
- Coordinates: 40°19′12″N 80°0′24″W
- Area: 1 acre (0.40 ha)
- Built: 1772, 1808, 1830
- Architect: Miller, James; Miller, Oliver
- NRHP reference No.: 75001605

Significant dates
- Added to NRHP: January 17, 1975
- Designated PHLF: 1979

The Oliver Miller Homestead, site of the James Miller House, is a public museum that commemorates pioneer settlers of Western Pennsylvania. It is located in Allegheny County, Pennsylvania's South Park 10 miles (16 km) south of downtown Pittsburgh in South Park Township.

The Millers were among the first families in the area when the land was opened for settlement in 1769, a year after The New Purchase was completed at Ft. Stanwix the year prior. This location is primarily associated with the Whiskey Rebellion which put the property at the center of early-American history. With that said, the incident at the Miller farm during the Whiskey Rebellion did not happen at this location, but rather next door at William Miller's farm. Oliver Miller Sr.'s son, James Miller, inherited the farm in 1782 when his father, Oliver Miller Sr., died. In 1794, US Marshal David Lennox was led to the home of William Miller, brother of James, by John Neville (who was related to the Millers through marriage) to issue a writ of non-compliance for not registering his still. It came with a steep fine and a summons to Philadelphia. Varying accounts of the event are in agreement that a shot was fired during the confrontation at William Miller's home by someone in the group of men who confronted the marshal. They were probably farmhands working in the field. The eye-witness account states their language was unknown to Lenox and Neville, which might have been a variation of Irish or Scottish. William Miller's homestead was located on South Park Golf Course, just up the lane from his brother's property. William was the captain of the local militia, and fate would have it that on the same day, the militia was drilling at Mingo Creek. Word quickly reached the militia about the event that had taken place at William's property which culminated in the assault on Neville's home in the coming days.

It was added to the National Register of Historic Places in 1975.

== History and architectural features ==
The property was likely originally purchased in 1769 by Silas Daxter / Deckster. On July 4th, 1772, Oliver Miller purchases the property. There is debate on when exactly the family moved to the location, but they were undoubtedly there by 1776 when Oliver Miller becomes a justice of the peace. There is conjecture that when the Millers arrived, a springhouse was already on the property from the original property owner, the aforementioned Silas Deckster / Daxter. A date was recently discovered on the springhouse that reads either "1765" or "1785". Either date would make it the oldest structure in Allegheny County's parks system. First, there was a log home built on the property. From an early account, it was a two-story structure with a winding staircase in the corner. This house was known locally for its shingles, a rare feature on early-American homes in this part of the country. At some point in the late 1700s, the stone kitchen was added to the back. The 1798 Window Tax shows the structure had 3 windows, and 27 "lights", or panes, was two rooms, likely the kitchen and the log home and one-and-a-half stories. The smaller stone addition on the right side of the home was erected in 1808, attached to the original log structure. In 1830, the log structure was torn down and the larger stone portion on the left was added.

This home is sometimes referred to as "Stone Manse", a name first found in early park records from the 1920's. A manse is a home occupied by a Presbyterian minister. Although no minister ever lived here, the Millers hosted Bethel Presbyterian Church services in the 1770s - 1780s before a proper worship house was constructed.

It was added to the National Register of Historic Places in 1975, and is a stop on the American Whiskey Trail.

== See also ==
- National Register of Historic Places listings in Allegheny County, Pennsylvania

== Additional reading ==
- Baldwin, Leland. Whiskey Rebels: The Story of a Frontier Uprising. Pittsburgh: University of Pittsburgh Press, 1939.
- Cooke, Jacob E. "The Whiskey Insurrection: A Re-Evaluation." Pennsylvania History, 30, July 1963, pp. 316–364.
