= South Park High School (Pennsylvania) =

Location
- 2005 Eagle Ridge Drive; South Park, Pennsylvania 15129; United States; 40.299520°N 79.991869°W

Information
- Other name: SPHS
- Type: Public high school
- School district: South Park School District
- NCES School ID: 422206000467
- Principal: David Palmer
- Teaching staff: 41.66 (on an FTE basis)
- Grades: 9–12
- Enrollment: 555 (2023-2024)
- Student to teacher ratio: 13.32
- Colors: Royal blue, white, black accent
- Mascot: Eagle
- Website: sphs.sparksd.org

South Park High School (SPHS) is a public high school in South Park Township, Pennsylvania, United States, and is a part of the South Park School District.

== Notable alumni ==
- Reggie Wells, former NFL guard
