= South Park Historic District =

The term South Park Historic District may refer to:

- South Park Manor Historic District, Chicago, Illinois, listed on the National Register of Historic Places listings in Chicago
- South Park Neighborhood, a historic district in Winchester, Kentucky, listed on the National Register of Historic Places listings in Clark County, Kentucky
- South Park Historic District (Dayton, Ohio), listed on the National Register of Historic Places in Dayton, Ohio
- South Park Historic District (Morgantown, West Virginia), listed on the National Register of Historic Places listings in Monongalia County, West Virginia
- A section of the South Park, San Diego neighborhood designated as the South Park Historic District by the San Diego Historic Resources Board
