= Bill Nuti =

American businessman

- Education: Long Island University
- Occupation: Businessman
- Known for: Chairman & CEO of NCR Corporation

William (Bill) R. Nuti is an American businessman from New York. He was the CEO and Chairman of NCR Corporation from 2005 until 2018, when he stepped down from the position. He joined the company after it spun out of AT&T. Nuti holds a BSc. in Finance and Economics from C.W. Post College.

== Education ==
Nuti has a BSc. in Finance and Economics from C.W. Post College, part of Long Island University (1986).

== Career ==
While in college, Nuti worked for IBM, selling copiers. Following his graduation in 1986, Nuti accepted a full-time position with IBM, selling telephone systems for an entity IBM had recently acquired. In 1988, Nuti left IBM for a start-up company, Network Equipment Technology, which was based in San Jose, California. In 1990, he joined Netrix as a regional manager. One of the company's customers was Cisco, which hired Nuti in 1991.

In 1997, Nuti moved to Singapore and ran Cisco in the Asia/Pacific region. In 1999, he moved to London and ran Cisco Europe, Middle East, and Africa, and more than doubled Cisco's revenue in the region. In 2001, he returned to Cisco's headquarters and became senior vice president responsible for both the company's Worldwide Service Provider business and the U.S. Theater Operations. In this dual role, he led Cisco's field operations, systems engineering, professional services, marketing and U.S. sales divisions.

In 2002, he left Cisco and joined Symbol Technologies as President and COO. He became CEO in 2003 and returned the company to profitability for the first time in five years, increasing revenue growth by 24% from 2002-2004.

=== NCR Corporation ===
When Nuti joined NCR in 2005 its compound annual growth rate over the eight years following the spinoff was less than 1 percent.

Nuti spent 2006-10 restructuring the company's entire supply chain. In January 2007, NCR announced a spinoff of Teradata, the company's data-warehousing business, which was completed on October 1, 2007. In 2009, NCR announced that its headquarters would move from Dayton, Ohio to Atlanta, Georgia. Nuti explained the decision in a 2012 interview: “The decision was good for the company long term, but we made it with a heavy heart.”

In 2011, NCR started making investments in developing the company vision. NCR made a number of acquisitions including Radiant in 2011, Retalix in 2013, and Digital Insight in 2014.

In November 2015, NCR announced a strategic partnership with Blackstone, which NCR said would accelerate its “ongoing strategic transformation into an integrated software and services company.” The agreement called for affiliates of Blackstone to invest $820 million in NCR in the form of perpetual convertible preferred shares. NCR used the Blackstone investment to help fund a share repurchase through a self-tender offer for $1 billion of its common stock.

As of 2016, NCR had $1.8 billion in software revenue and $600 million in cloud revenue, up from zero as recently as 2010. Its non-GAAP operating income increased from $383 million in 2010 to $840 million in 2016.

On March 22, 2018, Nuti announced he was stepping down from the position of NCR's CEO for health reasons.

=== Board memberships ===
In June 2008, Nuti was appointed to Sprint Communications' Board of Directors, where he served until July 2013. In May 2014, he was elected to the Board of Directors at Coach, Inc., where he serves on the human resources committee.

In 2014, Nuti became a member of the Georgia Institute of Technology advisory board, where he served until 2017. In December 2013, he joined the Board of Directors of United Continental Holdings (United Airlines), where he serves on finance, compensation, and public responsibility committees. He is a trustee at Long Island University. In the past, he served on the board of Opus360 Corp.

=== Writing and speaking ===
In 2014, Nuti was the primary speaker at the Dubai International Project Management Forum (DIPMF). He spoke at the White House Forum on Strategy for American Innovation. In 2017, articles by Nuti were published in The Wall Street Journal, Entrepreneur, and Mobile Payments Today.

=== Honors ===
In June 2005, American Business Awards called Nuti the “Best Turnaround Executive.” In 2015, he was named “Most Admired CEO” by the Atlanta Business Chronicle. He has also been included on Long Island University's list of Notable Alumni. In 2014, he was a recipient of the Atlantic Legal Foundation's Annual Award. In 2017, he received the Lifetime Global Innovation Award from the ATM Industry Association.

== Personal life ==
Nuti was raised in a two-bedroom tenement in the Bronx. To earn money, Nuti started delivering newspapers when he was nine years old.

He lives in New York City with his wife, Michele, and their one son.
