= South Park School District =

School district in Pennsylvania, USA

Location
- South Park PA, 15129; United States
- Coordinates: 40.3011°N 79.9902°W

District information
- Type: Public school district
- Motto: Strengthening Minds. Powering Futures.
- Grades: K–12
- Established: 1938 (Snowden)
- Schools: 3

Students and staff
- Athletic conference: WPIAL
- District mascot: Eagles
- Colors: Royal blue and white

Other information
- Website: www.sparksd.org

South Park School District is a small, suburban, public school district located in southern Allegheny County. It serves the residents of South Park Township, a suburb of Pittsburgh. South Park School District encompasses approximately 9 square miles (23 km^{2}) square miles. Per 2010 local census data, it serves a resident population of 13,416, a decrease of 924 from 2001. In 2009 the districts residents' per capita income was $21,538, while the median family income was $57,290.

== District History ==
Early One-Room Schoolhouses

Stewart School

Erected: 1920

Demolished: 2018

Open: 1920 - 2001, 2012-2016 [Cornerstone Christian Preparatory Academy]

Broughton School

Erected: 1929

Demolished: 2014

Open: 1929 - 2001

Library School

Erected: 1934

Open: 1934 - 2001

Snowden Township High School

Erected: 1958

Demolished: 2015

Open: 1958 - 2005

S.J. Engott Middle School

Erected: 1974

Open: 1974–Present

South Park Elementary Center

Erected: 2001

Open: 2001–Present

South Park High School

Erected: 2005

Open: 2005–Present

- South Park High School (9th–12th)
  - Formerly named Snowden Township High School
- South Park Middle School (5th–8th) Report Card 2010
  - Formerly named S.J. Engott Middle School
- South Park Elementary Center (K–4th) Report Card 2010
  - Stewart Elementary School (Closed 2001)
  - Library Elementary School (Closed 2001)
  - Broughton Elementary School (Closed 2001)

== Present-Day School Buildings ==
=== Elementary Center ===
Dr. L. Robert Furman, Principal

In the early 20th century, three elementary schools were built. Library and Broughton Schools, accepted students from their respective districts. A third, Stewart School, educated kindergarten and first grade students from both districts. In 1998, the township announced that a new elementary school would be built. The groundbreaking ceremony took place on February 12, 2000, with school superintendent Dr. Lawrence L. Muir and school board members digging the first dirt. In 2001, the South Park Elementary Center opened.

Broughton Elementary School was built in 1929 on Schang Drive. The neighborhood school took students in grades first through fourth. At the end of the 2001 school year, Broughton's front doors closed for good. In the winter of 2012, demolition began on tearing down Broughton Elementary, removing a crucial historic element in South Park history. As of spring 2015, no further construction has been made on the Broughton School's property. The only remnants that remain are the debris of bricks and other materials, as well as the cement stairs and meal handrail leading up to Broughton's front doors. Stewart School housed a Catholic high school until its demolition in 2018, and Library School has been renovated into an apartment building.

=== Middle School ===
Mrs. Lynn Como, Principal

Mr. Michael Petruzzi, Assistant Principal

The middle school houses 599 students in grades 5–8. Originally opened as S.J. Engott Middle School in 1976, the middle school has now taken on the name of the district. The middle school campus includes a large two-story building with a gymnasium, cafeteria, large group instruction room, band and chorus rooms, offices, and a greenhouse. There is also a large practice field for soccer, as well as a front and rear parking lots, basketball courts, and a softball field.

The middle school began a full-scale, $20.1 million renovation in 2015. Renovations include a 700-seat gymnasium, a fitness center, and a 190-seat large group instruction room. The cafeteria, library, and office suite will be extensively renovated. Improvements to plumbing, heating, ventilation, air conditioning, and electrical equipment are also planned. More security will be incorporated, involving more cameras and upgraded locking systems on all doors. Permanent walls will also replace the temporary, partition walls that were originally used. Fifth grade students were housed in the elementary center for the 2015–2016 school year to make room for the renovation. The project is expected to be complete in December 2016.

=== High School ===
Mr. David S. Palmer, Principal

Mr. Justin Dellarose, Assistant Principal

The original South Park High School opened in 1958 as Snowden Township High School on Ridge Road. A new South Park High School building opened in 2005, just down the hillside from the former building, creating a campus of the Elementary Center, new high school building, and Eagle Stadium. The old high school building was used for swim lessons until the new high school natatorium was complete. The building remained abandoned and neglected for almost a decade, being used as a storage facility for the districts custodial supplies. There was talk of renovating the building into a new middle school, creating a campus of all three schools and stadium. However, the building was in such bad condition after years of neglect, which lead to the demolition and abatement of the 57-year-old building. The old high school location now holds a maintenance and storage building, a marching band practice field, and a large parking lot for Eagle Stadium. As of the 2005/2006 school year, the school had 752 students enrolled and 44.5 teachers (on an FTE basis), for a student-teacher ratio of 16.9 students/teacher. The campus includes: six full computers labs, an Indoor swimming pool, a full cafeteria services, a lighted stadium with 8 lane track, central administration offices, two multi-purpose athletic fields, two maintenance buildings, upper and lower field houses, full sized and auxiliary gyms, and an auditorium. The average indoor area to be maintained is app. 208,000 sq ft.

== Extracurricular Activities ==
The district offers a wide variety of clubs, activities and sports.

=== Athletics ===
South Park High School competes in the PIAA's District 7, commonly referred to as the WPIAL. WPIAL-affiliated sports at SPHS include:

Boys' Sports

- Baseball
- Basketball
- Cross Country
- Football
- Golf
- Soccer
- Swimming/Diving
- Track & Field
- Wrestling

Girls' Sports

- Basketball
- Cross Country
- Soccer
- Softball
- Swimming/Diving
- Tennis
- Track & Field
- Volleyball
- Cheerleading
- Dance

Athletic facilities at South Park High School include a main gymnasium, an auxiliary gymnasium, an indoor 6-lane swimming pool, a football stadium with a 6-lane track, and a softball field.

Athletic facilities at South Park Middle School include a gymnasium, fitness center, a large athletic field, basketball court, and a baseball field.

Athletic facilities at South Park Elementary Center include a gymnasium and outdoor playground equipment.

==== PIAA Team Championships ====
Gender	Sport	Year(s)
Boys	Football	1997, 2005
Girls	Soccer	2007
Boys	Soccer	2005, 2006
Girls	Basketball	2013

==== WPIAL Team Championships ====
Gender	Sport	Year(s)
Boys	Football	1955, 1997, 2005, 2024
Girls	Soccer	2001, 2006, 2007, 2008, 2018
Boys	Soccer	2005, 2006, 2014
Girls	Basketball	1998, 2008, 2013
Girls	Softball	2003
Boys	Track	1975
Girls	Track	1998, 2010
Boys	Cross Country	1986
Boys	Golf	1992

== Alumni ==
- Reggie Wells – Guard for the Arizona Cardinals; 6th-round pick in the 2003 NFL Draft.
- Bob Jury – Safety for the University of Pittsburgh and San Francisco 49ers; Pitt records for all-time interceptions (21) & interceptions in a season (10). 3rd-round pick in the 1978 NFL Draft.
- Randy Dobnak – Pitcher for the Minnesota Twins
