= John Henry Patterson (NCR owner) =

American industrialist

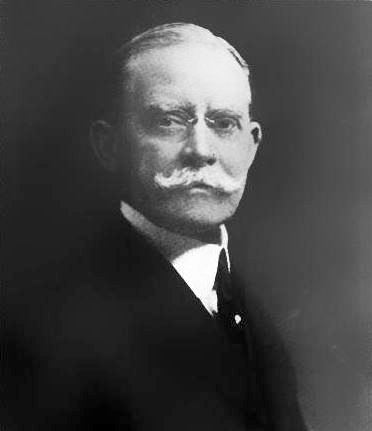
- Born: December 13, 1844; Dayton, Ohio, U.S.
- Died: May 7, 1922 (aged 77); Philadelphia, Pennsylvania, U.S.
- Resting place: Woodland Cemetery, Dayton, Ohio
- Education: Miami University, Dartmouth College
- Occupation: Businessman
- Known for: Founder of National Cash Register Company, led recovery effort after the Great Dayton Flood
- Awards: John Scott Medal (1901)

John Henry Patterson (December 13, 1844 – May 7, 1922) was an American industrialist and founder of the National Cash Register Company. He was a businessperson and salesperson. He headed relief efforts after the 1913 Dayton flood, and successfully promoted the city manager form of government.

== Early years ==
John Henry Patterson was born in Dayton, Ohio in 1844. He spent his childhood working on the family farm and in his father's sawmills. He served in the 131st Ohio Volunteers in 1862. He graduated from Dartmouth College in 1867 where he was a member of Kappa Kappa Kappa Fraternity (now Kappa Pi Kappa) After college, he worked as a canal toll collector until 1870. That year, he began managing the Southern Ohio Coal and Iron Company. He became an investor in the National Manufacturing Company in 1882, buying it out with his brother by 1884 to form National Cash Register Company.

== Pioneering business practices ==
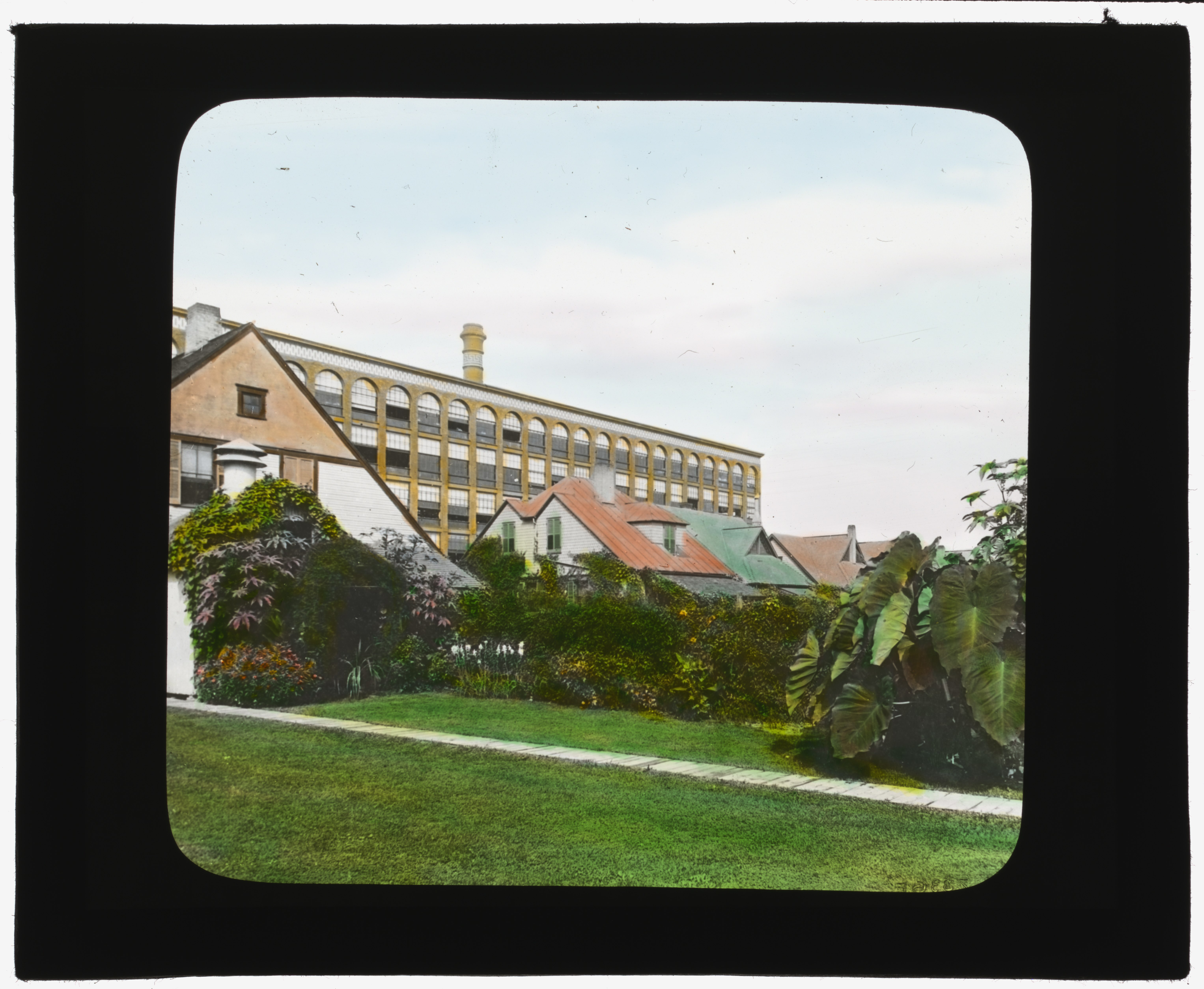
Worker house gardens in Dayton, Ohio, after renovation by John Charles Olmsted (1896)

In 1893 he constructed the first "daylight factory" buildings with floor-to-ceiling glass windows that let in light and could be opened to let in fresh air as well. This was in an era when sweatshops were still in operation elsewhere. He hired John Charles Olmsted to landscape the grounds of the National Cash Register Company campus in Dayton, with spacious lawns and landscaping with colorful plantings. Olmsted also had a hand in designing the residential community surrounding the plant (South Park) as well as a park system for the City of Dayton.

Based on a 16-page handbook written by his brother-in-law, Patterson established the world's first sales training school on the grounds of the NCR factory campus (at Sugar Camp in Dayton, Ohio). He also coined a phrase for his service division which, until about the time the company was bought by AT&T, hung on the wall of every service department in the company. The phrase was, "We Cannot Afford To Have A Single Dissatisfied Customer".

== NCR and IBM ==
Patterson was famous for firing Thomas Watson Sr, who went on to become General Manager, then President, of CTR, later renamed IBM. So many prominent businessmen were trained and fired by Patterson that some business historians regarded experience at NCR as the rough equivalent of an MBA degree. Patterson was also famous for firing many people on rather trivial grounds, for example, if they could not tell him why the flags happened to be flying that day. Charles F. Kettering was hired and fired at NCR multiple times; once for failing at an equestrian event. Reportedly, Patterson fired him with the remark: "Anybody who can't handle a horse can't handle men."

=== Violation of the Sherman Antitrust Act ===
In 1912, NCR was found guilty of violating the Sherman Antitrust Act. Patterson, Watson and 26 other NCR executives and managers were convicted of illegal anti-competitive sales practices and were sentenced to one year of imprisonment. Their convictions were unpopular with the public due to the efforts of Patterson and Watson to help those affected by the Dayton, Ohio floods of 1913, but efforts to have them pardoned by President Woodrow Wilson were unsuccessful. However, their convictions were overturned on appeal in 1915 on the grounds that important defense evidence should have been admitted.

== Great Dayton Flood ==
During the Great Dayton Flood disaster, John H. Patterson contributed significantly to the recovery efforts. NCR employees built nearly 300 flat-bottomed boats and Patterson organized rescue teams to save the thousands of people stranded on roofs and the upper stories of buildings. He turned the NCR factory on Stewart Street into an emergency shelter providing food and lodging, and he organized local doctors and nurses to provide medical care. Patterson's vision for a managed watershed for the Great Miami River resulted in the development of the Miami Conservancy District, one of the first major flood control districts in the United States.

== Personal life ==
Patterson attended Miami University, Oxford, Ohio and graduated from Dartmouth College in 1867. He was something of a health fanatic, and adopted one regimen after another, most of which were required of his executives and employees. While at Miami, Patterson was a member of Beta Theta Pi.

In 1888 Patterson married Katharine Beck of Brookline, Massachusetts. They had two children: Frederick Beck Patterson and Dorothy Forster Patterson. Mrs. Patterson died of diphtheria in June, 1894 at the age of 28. John's nephew, Lt Frank Patterson, was killed in 1918 when his military aircraft crashed near Dayton, Ohio, one of the early WW1 casualties in the US. Wright-Patterson Air Force Base was re-named in his memory as well as honoring the Dayton based Wright Brothers.

Patterson lived in his Swiss chalet estate "The Far Hills" in Oakwood, Montgomery County, Ohio. Patterson loved the Adirondacks and built his summer estate on Beaver Lake, on the Beaver River east of Lowville, NY. His family built two other estates on the lake. All three estates still exist, two as church camps (Beaver Camp and Unirondack), one as private bed and breakfast.

== Death and legacy ==
Patterson died on May 7, 1922, two days after reviewing plans with General Billy Mitchell to develop a center for aviation research in Dayton. He is interred in the Woodland Cemetery, Dayton, Ohio. He left no great fortune because of his expenditures on social programs at his company, and because he believed that "shrouds have no pockets." He left ownership of the company to his son Frederick Beck Patterson. $55 million in stock was subsequently offered to the public by Dillon, Read & Co. in January, 1926 in an initial public offering, which was noted in the January 4, 1926 edition of the New York Times as "the largest single offering of stock in the history of the country."

Mr. Patterson was inducted into the Junior Achievement U.S. Business Hall of Fame in 1979.

Patterson's methods influenced United States business for a generation. In the period 1910-1930 it was estimated that one-sixth of United States business executives were former NCR executives.
