= Reggie Wells (American football) =

American football player (born 1980)

Duquesne Dukes
- Title: Defensive line coach

Personal information
- Born: November 3, 1980 (age 46); South Park Township, Pennsylvania, U.S.
- Listed height: 6 ft 4 in (1.93 m)
- Listed weight: 318 lb (144 kg)

Career information
- High school: South Park
- College: Clarion
- NFL draft: 2003: 6th round, 177th overall pick

Career history

Playing
- Arizona Cardinals (2003−2009); Philadelphia Eagles (2010); Carolina Panthers (2011); Green Bay Packers (2012)*; San Diego Chargers (2012); Buffalo Bills (2012); San Diego Chargers (2012)
- * Offseason or practice squad member only

Coaching
- Fox Chapel Area HS (PA) (2015–2017) Offensive line coach; Peters Township HS (PA) (2018) Offensive line coach; Mt. Lebanon HS (PA) (2019) Defensive line coach; California (PA) (2020–2021) Defensive line coach; Duquesne (2022–present) Defensive line coach

Career NFL statistics
- Games played: 120
- Games started: 93
- Fumble recoveries: 2
- Stats at Pro Football Reference

Reginald Arness Wells (born November 3, 1980) is an American former professional football player who was a guard in the National Football League (NFL). He played college football for the Clarion Golden Eagles and was selected by the Arizona Cardinals in the sixth round of the 2003 NFL draft. Wells was also a member of the Philadelphia Eagles, Carolina Panthers, Green Bay Packers, San Diego Chargers and Buffalo Bills.

== Early life ==
Wells attended South Park High School in South Park, Pennsylvania, where he lettered in basketball and football. In football, as a senior, he was an All-League defensive end and helped lead his team to the League title. He was also an integral member of the 1997 team that captured the PIAA AA State Championship.

== College career ==
At Clarion University, Wells was a four-year starter, garnering two NCAA Division II All-America honors, and was a two-time All-Pennsylvania State Athletic Conference choice.

== Professional career ==
=== Arizona Cardinals ===
Wells was selected in the sixth round (177th overall) of the 2003 NFL draft by the Arizona Cardinals. Wells scored his first NFL touchdown by recovering an Edgerrin James fumble in the end zone during week 5 of the 2007 NFL season.

=== Philadelphia Eagles ===
Wells was traded to the Philadelphia Eagles on September 3, 2010, in exchange for a 6th round draft pick in 2011. He re-signed with Philadelphia on August 20, 2011, after becoming a free agent following the 2010 season. He was released during final roster cuts on September 3.

=== Carolina Panthers ===
On September 13, 2011, Wells signed with the Carolina Panthers, only to be released on September 20. He was re-signed on October 19 after Jeff Otah was placed on injured reserve. He was released yet again on November 30, 2011.

=== Green Bay Packers ===
On August 8, 2012, Wells signed with the Green Bay Packers, but was released just 3 weeks later on August 31, 2012.

=== San Diego Chargers (first stint) ===
On September 11, 2012, Wells was signed by the San Diego Chargers. However, he was released five days later.

=== Buffalo Bills ===
On October 9, 2012, Wells was signed by the Buffalo Bills. He was waived 10 days later.

=== San Diego Chargers (second stint) ===
Wells signed with the Chargers on December 5, 2012. He was placed on injured reserve on December 18, 2012.

== Coaching career ==
After spending five years coaching high school football, Wells joined California (PA) as the defensive line coach. In 2022, he took the same position for Duquesne.
