= Copient Technologies =

Coordinates: 40.4638°N 86.9330°W

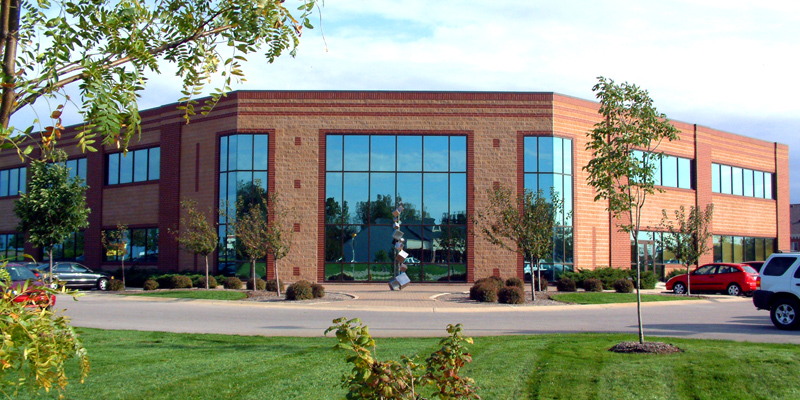
- Copient's West Lafayette offices, 2005.
- Industry: Retail marketing technologies
- Predecessor: eGenerosity
- Founded: 1999; 27 years ago in West Lafayette, Indiana, United States
- Founders: Eric Davis, Mark McGregor, and Bret Besecker
- Products: Yellowbox; EasyPoint Mini; Logix; Advanced Marketing System
- Parent: NCR Voyix

Copient Technologies is part of NCR Corporation and specializes in retail marketing technologies. Founded in 1999 by Eric Davis, Mark McGregor, and Bret Besecker, it was headquartered in the Purdue Research Park in West Lafayette, Indiana, and was an independent company until its acquisition in April 2003 by Atlanta-based NCR. The West Lafayette office closed on 1 October 2013.

Copient's main software product was Logix, an offer-management application for high-volume retailers that's now part of NCR's Advanced Marketing Solution.
