= NCR Voyager =

The NCR Voyager was an SMP computer platform produced by the NCR Corporation circa 1985. It used the Micro Channel bus, was based initially on the Intel 486 and predated the Intel SMP specification. Linux support for some models existed between 2005 and 2010. Later models supported up to 32 CPU using the Intel Pentium Pro.

== Sources ==
- "Linux kernel source tree — file history for Documentation/voyager.txt". Kernel.org.
- "Linux kernel source tree — Voyager.txt". Kernel.org.
