= South Park Mall (Louisiana) =

Defunct shopping mall in Shreveport, Louisiana

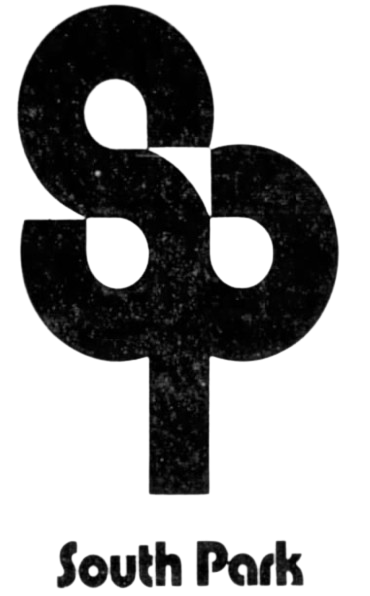
- Location: Shreveport, Louisiana, United States
- Coordinates: 32°24′52″N 93°48′07″W
- Address: 8924 Jewella Ave, Shreveport, LA 71118
- Opened: July 31, 1975; 51 years ago
- Closed: 2005; 21 years ago
- Developer: Melvin Simon and Associates
- Owner: Summer Grove Baptist Church
- Num. of stores: 74 (0 open 74 vacant)
- Num. of anchor tenants: 3 (0 open 3 vacant)
- Floor area: 850,332 square feet (78,998.4 m^{2})
- Floors: 1

South Park Mall was a 850,332 square feet (78,998.4 m^{2}) shopping mall located in Shreveport, Louisiana that opened July 31, 1975. The mall was converted into the Summer Grove Baptist Church.

== History ==
South Park Mall was developed by Melvin Simon and Associates out of Indianapolis. The mall opened July 31, 1975 with 74 stores and 3 anchor tenants, Montgomery Ward, JCPenney, and Dillard's. with Selber Bros., Beall-Ladymon, and rubenstein's opening as smaller anchors. South Park Mall was also the largest mall in the state at its opening.

In 1987 Rubenstein's closed all of their Shreveport stores which included South Park. it later became a Phar-Mor Drug Store in 1990.

In April, 1988 Selber Bros. closed all of their stores except for their Lafayette store.

On March 10, 1990 a gang shooting would leave tenants shaken up. the manager at the time Bill Silvis said that details were vague, the shooting seemed to be accidental, as the gun discharged at the ceiling, and gang police related. 5 teens where arrested after the incident. Bill Silvis also increased security at the mall after the incident.

In 1994 Beall-Ladymon transitioned into Stage Department Store.

By the 1990s traffic around the mall decreased. the first anchor to leave the mall was Montgomery Ward. They closed their store with 39 stores on May 2, 1999. People hoped the space would be filled with a upscale department store like Foley's or Macy's.In 1999 a teenager was shot in the head; in 2000 a elderly man was robbed in a bathroom in the mall.

JCPenney closed in July, 2000 leaving dillard's as the last major anchor in the mall. The mall was dead because it was in a bad area. Crime was increasing ,mostly shootings and robberies, which in turn was pushing tenants away like current and future stores.

In spring of 2001 Dillard's would close their South Park Mall store. This left the mall with no anchor stores.

In 2002 Phar-Mor would become Burlington Coat Factory.

In 2005 Summer Grove Baptist Church would buy the mall and convert the mall into a church. The former JCPenney space became the church's place of worship.

Stage closed between the 2005-2007 time range, and as of now Burlington Coat Factory has closed.

== Anchors ==
- Montgomery Ward (1975-1999)
- JCPenney (1975-2000) later became Summer Grove Baptist Church in 2005
- Dillard's (1975-2001)
