= South Park (Pittsburgh) =

Park in Pennsylvania, United States

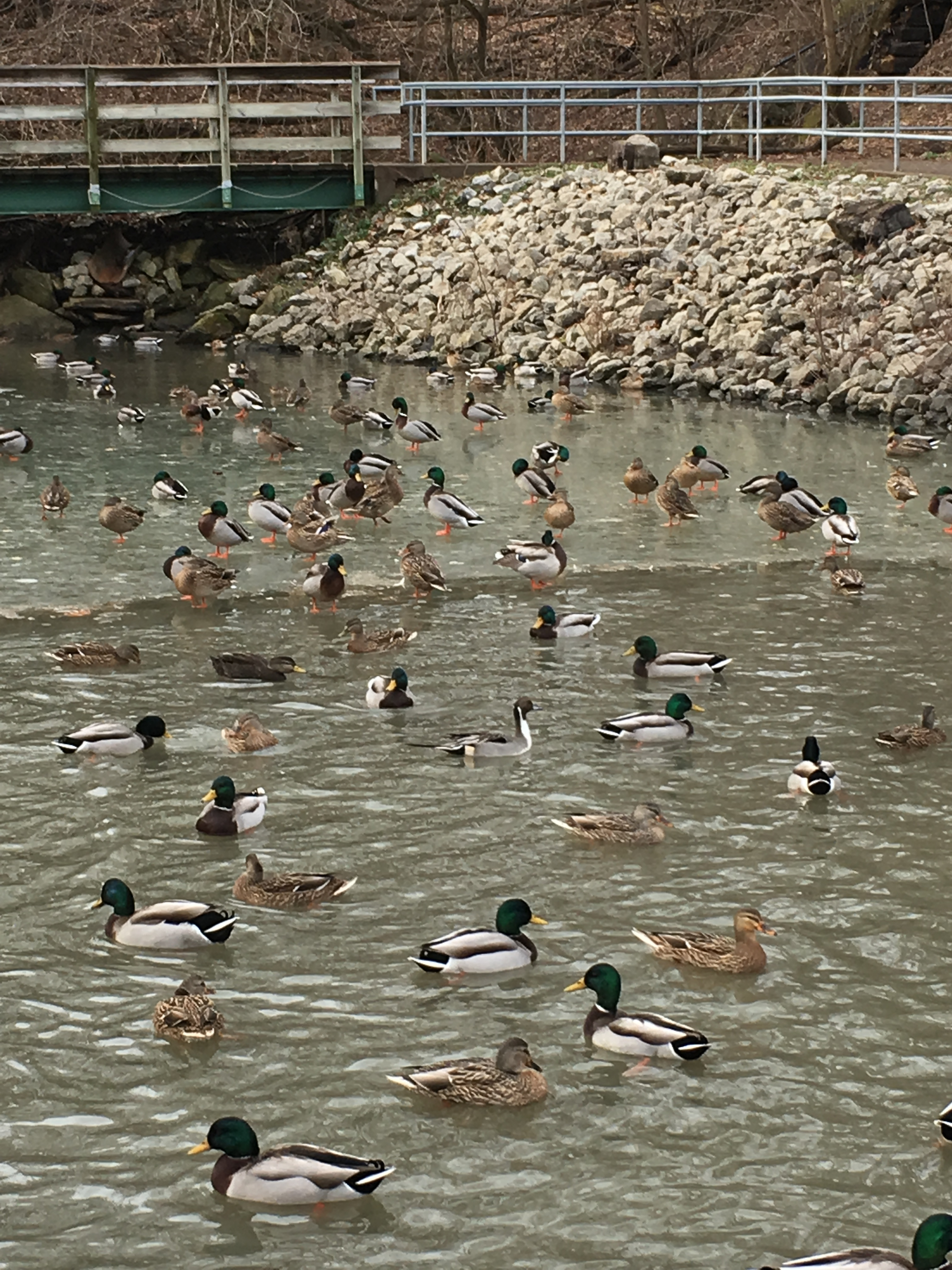
- Duck Pond

- Location within Pennsylvania Location within the United States
- Type: County
- Location: Allegheny County, Pennsylvania
- Coordinates: 40°19′12.29″N 80°0′23.47″W
- Area: 2,013-acre (8.15 km^{2})

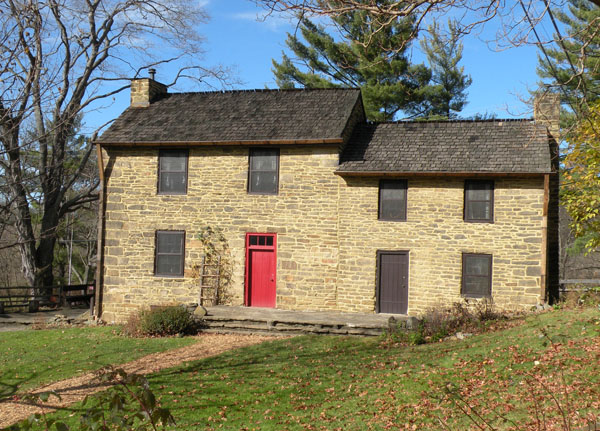
The Stone Manse

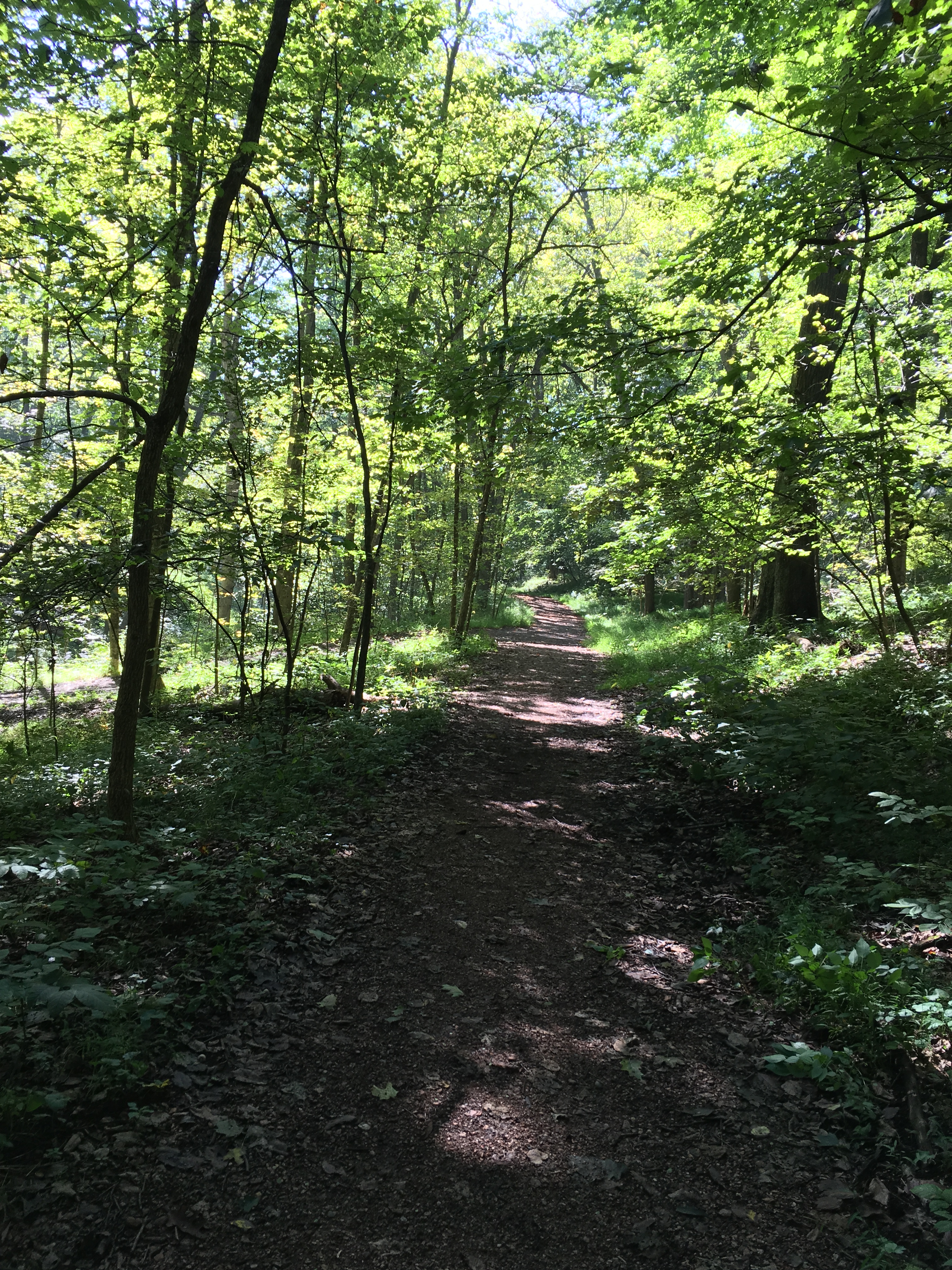
South Park - Montour Connector Trail

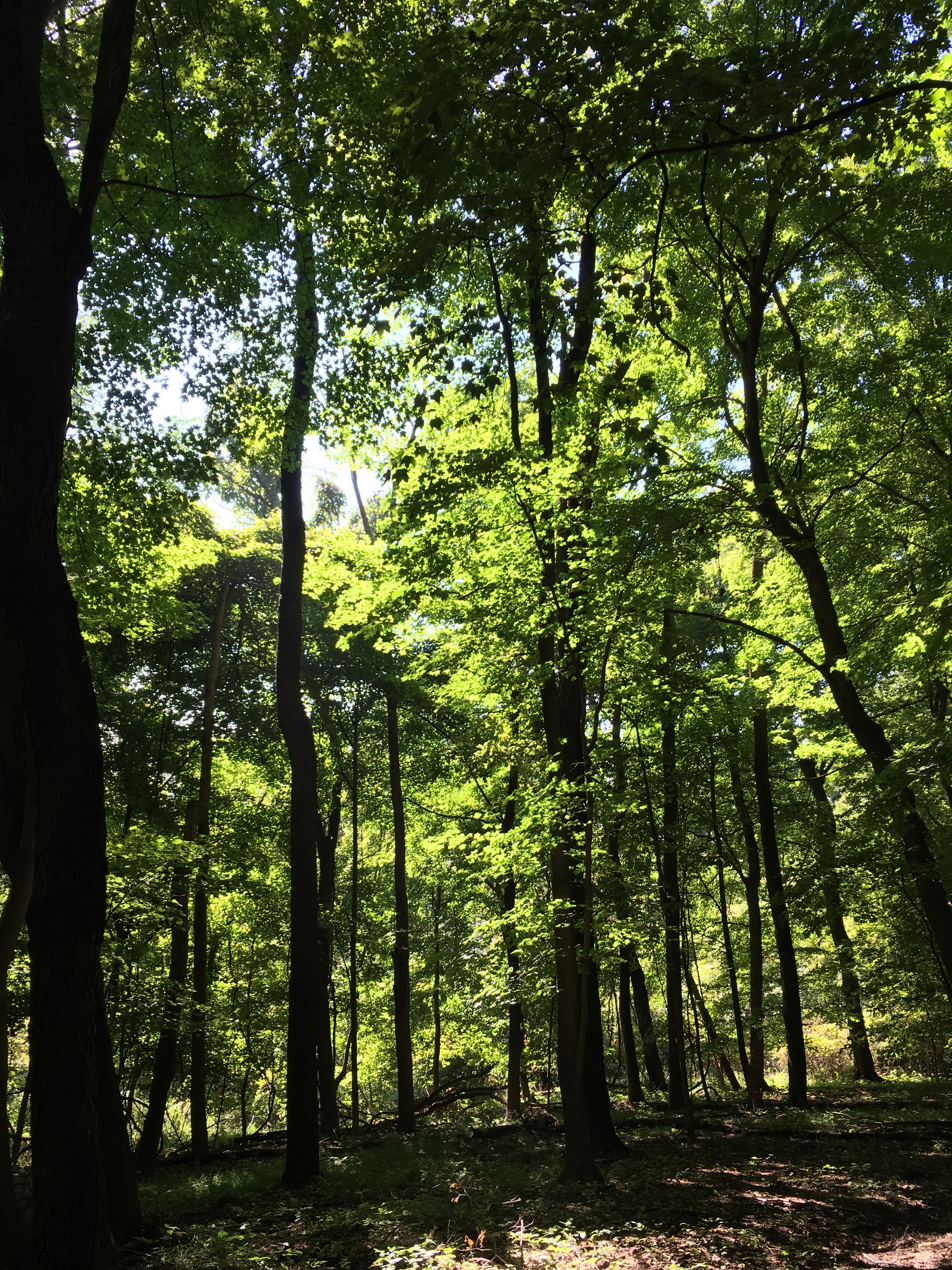
Sleepy Hollow

South Park is a 2,013-acre (8.15 km^{2}) county park in Allegheny County, Pennsylvania, United States. It is the second largest in the county's 12,000-acre (49 km^{2}) network of nine parks.

== History and notable features ==
Completed in 1931, South Park is sited 15 miles (24 km) south of Downtown Pittsburgh in Bethel Park municipality and South Park Township. The park offers a wave pool, golf course, ice skating rink, picnic groves, tennis courts, and miles of trails. The South Park Nature Center offers public nature and environmental education programs year round during the week and on the weekend. The Allegheny County Park Rangers also offer a wide variety of environmental education programs.

Beginning in the 1930s, South Park was used as the county fairgrounds and for more than thirty years attracted a half million people each season. By the late 1960s, farming in the county had declined and the fair was discontinued in 1971.

It is the location of the Oliver Miller Homestead, an important site of the Whiskey Rebellion.
