= South Park Historic District (Dayton, Ohio) =

Historic district in Ohio, United States

- South Park
- U.S. National Register of Historic Places
- U.S. Historic district
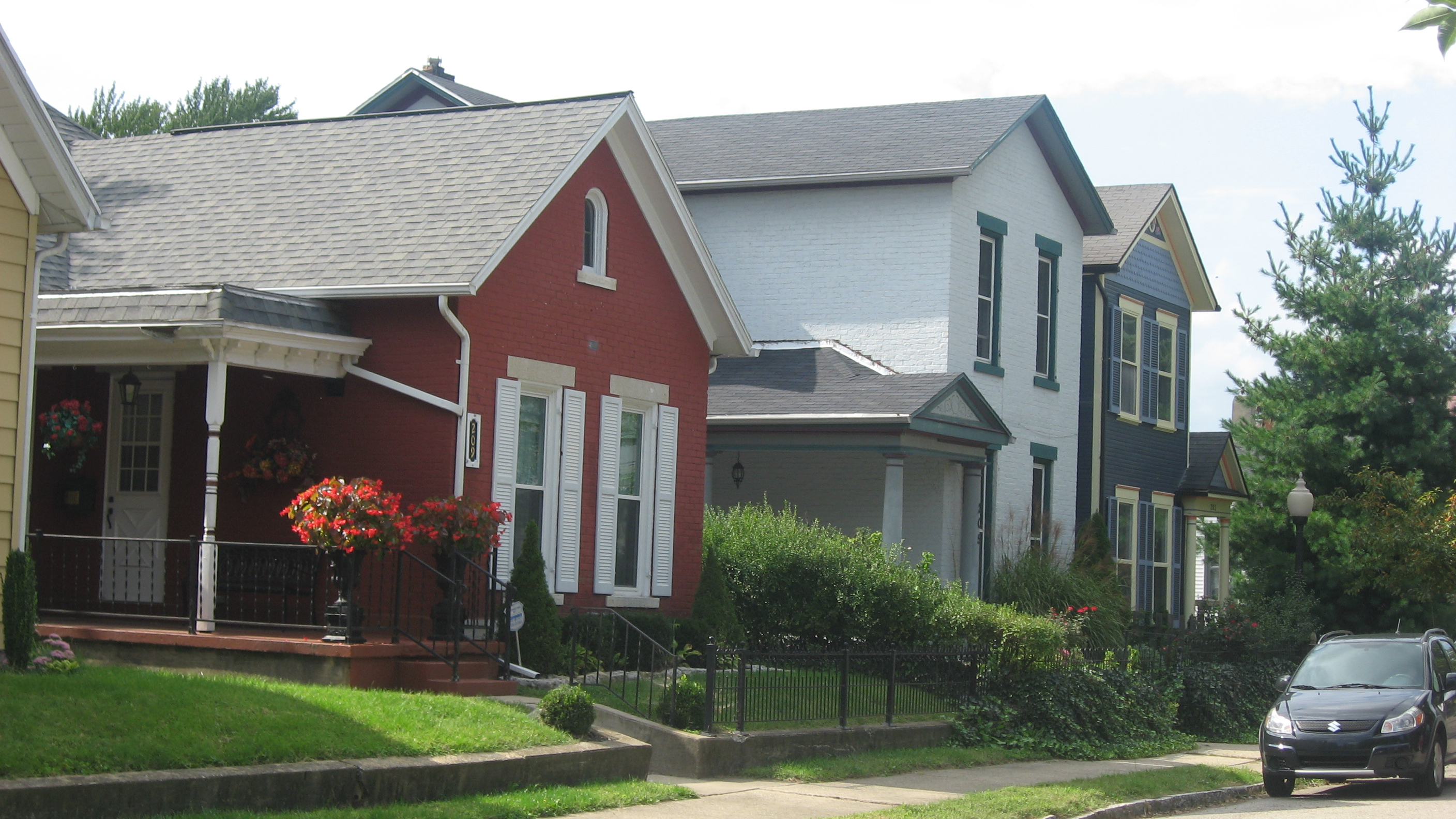
- Houses on Perrine Street

- Location within Ohio Location within the United States
- Coordinates: 39°44′54″N 84°10′44″W
- Built: 1880s
- Architectural style: Second Empire, High Victorian Italianate, Queen Anne, Federal and Romanesque Revival
- NRHP reference No.: 84003794 (original); 88000857 (increase)

Significant dates
- Added to NRHP: August 23, 1984
- Boundary increase: June 16, 1988

South Park is a 24-block, 150-acre area of more than 780 structures primarily dating from the 1880s to the early twentieth century. It is located south of downtown Dayton, Ohio, just north of the University of Dayton campus and Woodland Cemetery, and east of Miami Valley Hospital. Mainly residential in character, South Park is significant because of the variety of its architecture, which includes vernacular, cottage, and high style examples, and because of its association with John H. Patterson, founder of the National Cash Register Company (NCR).

== Slidertown ==
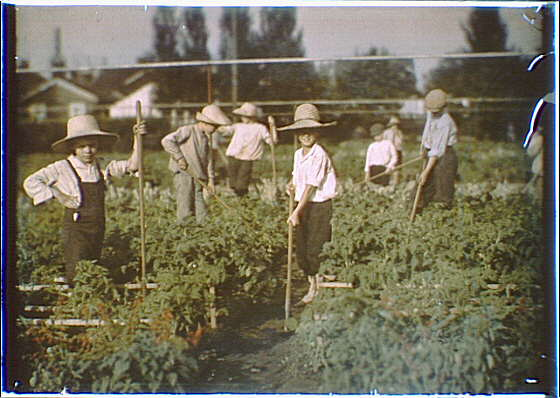
Children in the gardens of the National Cash Register Company

The first structures were built in Sliderstown, named after Reverend Slider, in the mid-1800s.

When John H. Patterson founded the National Cash Register Company in 1884, the neighborhood around the factory complex, Slidertown, had a poor reputation. To encourage workers to live closer in a beautiful environment, Patterson employed corporate welfare and began to clean up the area. He hired the Olmsted Brothers to design the landscape around the factory and recreate the neighborhood's cottage gardens as models for residents. Residents also learned the principals of good planting so they had the skills to plant and maintain their own yards, and prizes were awarded for the best gardens. In 1897, the National Cash Register Company's Boys' Garden was founded to create a connection for boys in the neighborhood to learn responsibility that would ultimately make them successful citizens and workers and dissuade them from becoming a nuisance.

In addition to the landscaping, a kindergarten was established and the factory itself was the first "daylight factory" to complete the beautification of the workers environments. By 1901, the area had become a garden-filled community and was known as the desirable neighborhood "South Park".

Until the advent of the automobile enabled NCR workers to move further afield, the neighborhood continued to be associated with Patterson's firm. Many company picnics and other functions took place on Park Drive Boulevard in the heart of the district.

== Historic district ==
Boundaries of the historic district

On August 23, 1984, South Park was registered on the National Register of Historic Places, bounding streets Park Dr., Morton Ave., Hickory St., and Wayne Ave. (No. 84003794). On July 16, 1988, this expanded to encompass Wyoming St., Nathan Pl., Oak St., Alberta St. and Blaine St. (No. 88000857). City of Dayton Ordinance #26219.

In 2007, South Park was chosen by the Dayton chapter of the American Institute of Architects as its community partner. This resulted in the creation of housing designs and landscaping concepts consistent with South Park's participation in Rehabarama in both 2001 and 2007.

== Architecture ==
=== Structures ===
The architecture of South Park includes examples of Second Empire, High Victorian Italianate, Queen Anne, Federal and Romanesque Revival in one- and two-story structures of brick and frame.

=== Landscape ===
Commissioned by Patterson, John Charles Olmsted was responsible for the layout of Park Drive's landscape. This boulevard once adorned a fountain centerpiece and waterway running through its middle.

== Notable people ==
- Martin Sheen, actor

== See also ==
- National Register of Historic Places listings in Dayton, Ohio
