= South Park Township, Pennsylvania =

Township in Pennsylvania, US

South Park
- Township
- South Park Township
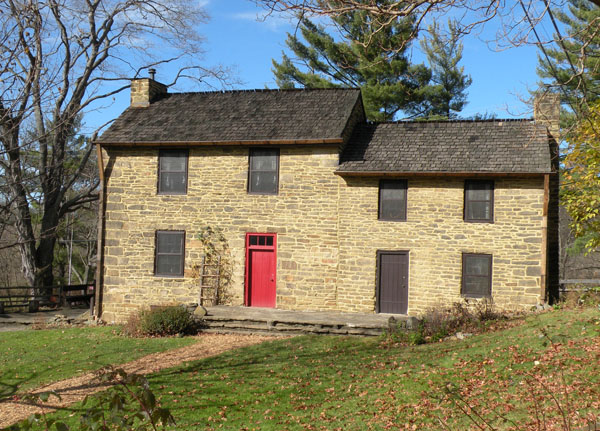
- The James Miller House (aka "Stone Manse")
- Nickname: Park
- Location in Allegheny County and state of Pennsylvania
- Coordinates: 40°17′54″N 80°0′8″W
- Country: United States
- State: Pennsylvania
- County: Allegheny

Area
  - Total: 9.27 sq mi (24.01 km^{2})
  - Land: 9.27 sq mi (24.01 km^{2})
  - Water: 0 sq mi (0.00 km^{2})

Population (2010)
  - Total: 13,416
  - Estimate (2018): 13,275
  - Density: 1,443.2/sq mi (557.23/km^{2})
- Time zone: UTC-5 (Eastern (EST))
  - Summer (DST): UTC-4 (EDT)
- ZIP code: 15129
- FIPS code: 42-003-72400

South Park Township is a township in the southern part of Allegheny County, Pennsylvania, United States, near Pittsburgh. The population was 13,416 at the 2010 census.

A large portion of the township consists of a county park of the same name.

== History ==
Composed of portions of St. Clair and Jefferson townships in 1845, South Park was originally called Snowden Township, named after John M. Snowden, a prominent businessman, politician and former Pittsburgh mayor, who had died earlier that year. In the 1930s, Allegheny County acquired several large parcels of farm land mostly within Snowden Township and created a regional recreational area named South Park. The huge success of South Park, and the fact the facility occupies roughly one-third of the community's total area, eventually prompted a 1966 referendum in which the township was renamed.

The area in and around South Park Township was settled in the mid-18th century. It is the location of the Oliver Miller Homestead where in 1794, the first shots of the Whiskey Rebellion were fired. A log house was originally built on the site in 1772; it was replaced by a stone structure around 1830, which is open for public tours.

== Geography ==
South Park is located at 40°17′54″N 80°0′7″W (40.298382, -80.002097). South Park's zip code is 15129. According to the United States Census Bureau, the township has a total area of 9.2 square miles (23.8 km^{2}), all land. A negligible area is covered by streams and creeks, most notably Peters Creek. South Park, a 1,999-acre (809 ha) recreational area operated by Allegheny County, is located mostly within the boundaries of South Park Township, although a portion is located in adjacent Bethel Park.

The township is on the Allegheny Plateau, near where the Allegheny River from the northeast and Monongahela River from the southeast join to form the Ohio River in Pittsburgh. South Park township's topography is quite hilly. The hilltops are somewhat "carved" out by the streams in the area.

=== Surrounding neighborhoods ===
South Park Township has five borders, including Baldwin to the north, Pleasant Hills and Jefferson Hills to the east, Union Township (in Washington County) to the south, and Bethel Park to the west.

=== Climate ===
South Park falls in the humid continental zone (Köppen Dfa/Dfb). It features four distinct seasons, with precipitation somewhat evenly spread throughout the year. Summers are hot and humid (with occasional heat waves), while winters are cold and snowy. Fall and spring are mild to warm.

The warmest month of the year in South Park, as in most of the northern hemisphere, is July. The average high temperature is 81 °F (27.2 °C), with overnight low temperatures averaging 57 °F (13.9 °C). July is often humid, resulting in a considerable heat index. The coldest month of the year is January, when the average high temperature is 30 °F (−1.1 °C). Overnight low temperatures average 18 °F (−7.8 °C). The highest temperature ever recorded in South Park was 101 °F (38.3 °C), on July 16, 1988, and the coldest temperature ever recorded was −23 °F (−30.6 °C), on January 19, 1994.

Due to its position on the windward side of the Allegheny Mountains, South Park Township receives heavier precipitation than cities located farther to the west, and many days are subject to overcast skies, with 153 days of the year with some precipitation and only 2024 sunshine hours per year. Precipitation is greatest in May, due to frequent thunderstorms and more organized low pressure systems which track up the eastern coast of the United States. On average, 4.04 inches (103 mm) of precipitation falls during this month. The driest month of the year is October, when 2.35 inches (60 mm). Annual precipitation is around 37.9 inches (963 mm), while annual snowfall is 40.3 inches (102 cm).

South Park has been hit with extreme weather. The Blizzard of 1993 dumped 23 inches (58 cm) of snow in under 24 hours. A blizzard in February 2010 dumped nearly two feet of snow in less than 24 hours, and nearly 4 feet in the following week. In September 2004, the remnants of Hurricane Ivan brought gusty winds and dropped nearly 6 inches (150 mm) of rain in 12 hours.

Climate data for South Park, Pennsylvania
| Month | Jan | Feb | Mar | Apr | May | Jun | Jul | Aug | Sep | Oct | Nov | Dec | Year |
|---|---|---|---|---|---|---|---|---|---|---|---|---|---|
| Record high °F (°C) | 74 (23) | 76 (24) | 84 (29) | 90 (32) | 92 (33) | 96 (36) | 101 (38) | 97 (36) | 92 (33) | 88 (31) | 79 (26) | 74 (23) | 101 (38) |
| Mean daily maximum °F (°C) | 30 (−1) | 35 (2) | 48 (9) | 59 (15) | 69 (21) | 76 (24) | 81 (27) | 80 (27) | 71 (22) | 57 (14) | 43 (6) | 35 (2) | 57 (14) |
| Mean daily minimum °F (°C) | 18 (−8) | 20 (−7) | 29 (−2) | 38 (3) | 46 (8) | 54 (12) | 61 (16) | 60 (16) | 51 (11) | 38 (3) | 30 (−1) | 23 (−5) | 39 (4) |
| Record low °F (°C) | −23 (−31) | −13 (−25) | −2 (−19) | 14 (−10) | 26 (−3) | 34 (1) | 37 (3) | 35 (2) | 29 (−2) | 13 (−11) | −6 (−21) | −12 (−24) | −23 (−31) |
| Average precipitation inches (mm) | 2.6 (66) | 2.7 (69) | 3.8 (97) | 3.9 (99) | 4.2 (110) | 3.9 (99) | 3.8 (97) | 3.3 (84) | 3.2 (81) | 2.3 (58) | 3.0 (76) | 2.9 (74) | 39.6 (1,010) |
| Average snowfall inches (cm) | 16.5 (42) | 11.2 (28) | 8.2 (21) | 2.6 (6.6) | 0.6 (1.5) | 0 (0) | 0 (0) | 0 (0) | 0 (0) | 0.9 (2.3) | 5.8 (15) | 10.0 (25) | 56.8 (144) |
| Mean monthly sunshine hours | 93 | 110.2 | 155 | 183 | 217 | 243 | 254.2 | 229.4 | 198 | 167.4 | 99 | 74.4 | 2,023.6 |

=== Neighborhoods ===
South Park can be broken down into the six different neighborhoods. The neighborhoods are grouped primarily by the small towns throughout the township and the time era which the plans of homes were built.

==== Broughton ====
Broughton borders Curry and extends further down Brownsville Road. Most of Broughton is residential with a few businesses, gas stations, and eateries along Brownsville Road.

==== Bruceton ====
Located on the Eastern Edge of South Park Township, the Bruceton neighborhood runs along Lick Run Creek. Notable institutions include the National Energy Technology Laboratory and the US Bureau of Mines

==== Curry ====
On the northern side, the area is known as Curry. Curry is a mix of residential homes and a small commercial area, and Curry extends from the northeastern corner to the northwestern corner and down Brownsville Road. The former Broughton Elementary School was located here.

==== Library ====
Library, formally known as Loafer's Hollow, is a large neighborhood of South Park. It has a mix of residential, commerce, and industrial areas. Library is South Park Township's "Downtown". It has many businesses along Route 88. Along Piney Fork Road, there are also many shops and a few industrial complexes. There are many large plans of houses throughout Library also. South Park Middle School is also located here. Library is served by the Library station on the Port Authority of Allegheny County's light rail network's Silver Line.

==== Piney Fork ====
Piney Fork is in the south-central part of South Park. It is a large residential area with a few small stores and restaurants.

==== Snowden ====
Snowden is a neighborhood in the southeastern corner of the township. It is a rural area with some homes and farms. Snowden was once a small mining community, but was absorbed into South Park.

== Government and politics ==
Presidential Elections Results
| Year | Republican | Democratic | Third Parties |
|---|---|---|---|
| 2020 | 53% 4,518 | 45% 3,845 | 1% 110 |
| 2016 | 55% 3,941 | 44% 3,156 | 1% 58 |
| 2012 | 53% 3,685 | 46% 3,171 | 1% 59 |

== Education ==
The South Park School District is coterminous with the township. The school district has a single elementary school for grades K-4, a single middle school for grades 5–8, and a single high school for grades 9–12. The school district's mascot is the Eagles.

== Demographics ==
Historical population
| Census | Pop. | Note | %± |
|---|---|---|---|
| 1970 | 8,187 | | — |
| 1980 | 13,535 | | 65.3% |
| 1990 | 14,292 | | 5.6% |
| 2000 | 14,277 | | −0.1% |
| 2010 | 13,416 | | −6.0% |
| 2018 (est.) | 13,275 | | −1.1% |
U.S. Decennial Census

The census of 2010 concluded there were 13,416 people, 5,346 households, and 4,331 families living in the township. The population density was 1,563.6 people per square mile. The racial makeup of the township was 86.5% White, 10.2% African American, 0.1% Native American, 1.4% Asian, 0.0% Pacific Islander, 0.2% from other races, and 1.6% from two or more races. 1.7% of the population were Hispanic or Latino of any race.

As of the census of 2000, there were 14,340 people, 5,422 households, and 4,028 families living in the township. The population density was 1,563.6 inhabitants per square mile (603.7/km^{2}). There were 5,616 housing units at an average density of 612.4 per square mile (236.4/km^{2}). The racial makeup of the township was 92.15% White, 6.21% African American, 0.06% Native American, 0.76% Asian, 0.04% Pacific Islander, 0.12% from other races, and 0.66% from two or more races. 0.55% of the population were Hispanic or Latino of any race.

There were 5,422 households, out of which 35.3% had children under the age of 18 living with them, 62.0% were married couples living together, 9.5% had a female householder with no husband present, and 25.7% were non-families. 21.9% of all households were made up of individuals, and 6.3% had someone living alone who was 65 years of age or older. The average household size was 2.63 and the average family size was 3.09.

In the township the population was spread out, with 25.6% under the age of 18, 7.0% from 18 to 24, 31.2% from 25 to 44, 26.0% from 45 to 64, and 10.3% who were 65 years of age or older. The median age was 38 years. For every 100 females, there were 96.2 males. For every 100 females age 18 and over, there were 93.1 males.

The median income for a household in the township was $51,001, and the median income for a family was $57,290. Males had a median income of $41,002 versus $27,138 for females. The per capita income for the township was $21,538. About 4.8% of families and 4.6% of the population were below the poverty line, including 6.8% of those under age 18 and 5.7% of those age 65 or over.
