= NCR Voyix =

American software company

NCR Voyix Corporation
- Logo used since 2023

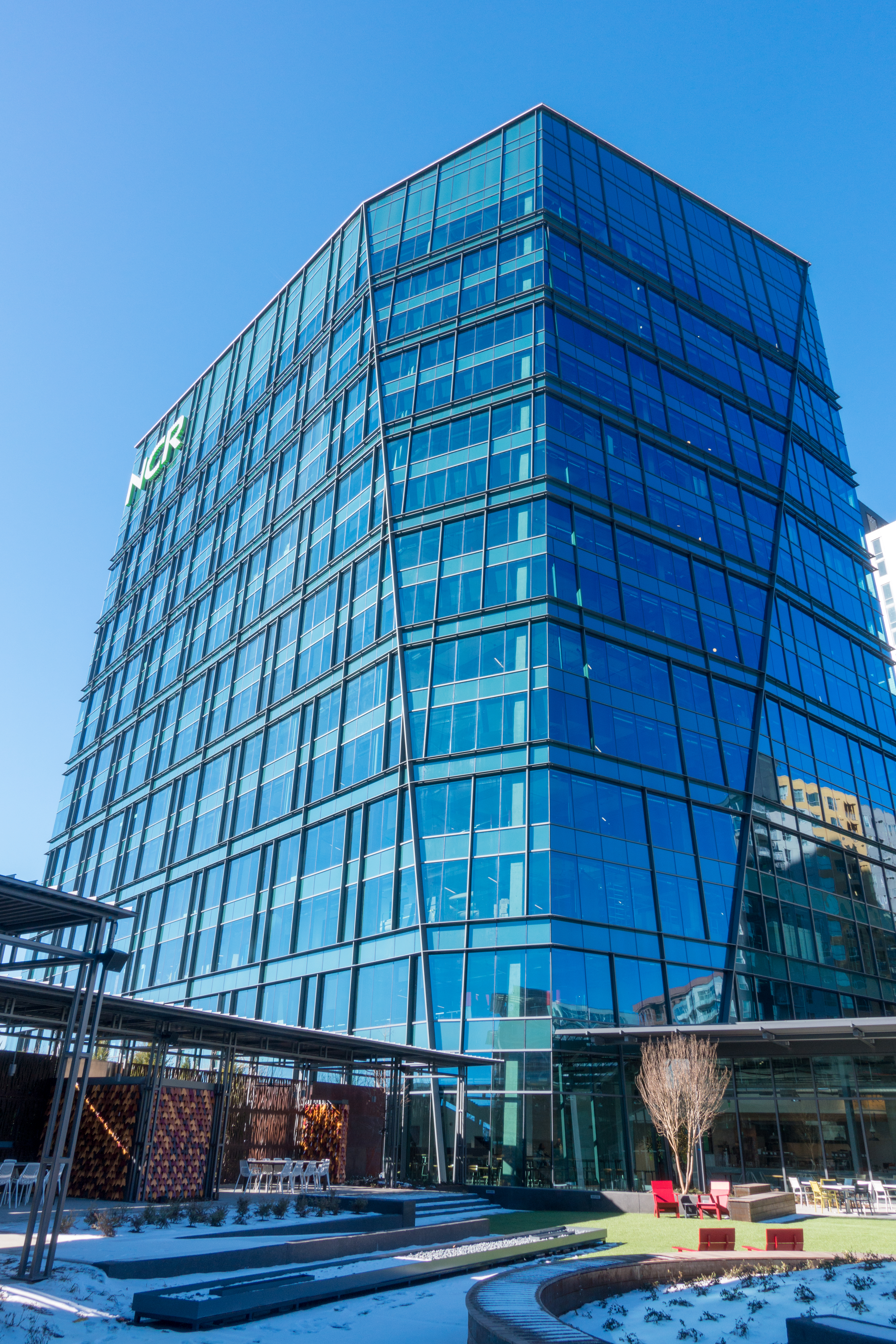
- Headquarters in Midtown Atlanta
- Formerly: National Cash Register; AT&T Global Information Solutions
- Type: Public
- Traded as: NYSE: VYX; S&P 600 Component
- Industry: Information technology
- Founded: 1884; 142 years ago, in Dayton, Ohio, U.S. Incorporation: 1900; 126 years ago
- Founder: John H. Patterson
- Headquarters: Atlanta, Georgia, U.S.
- Key people: Jim Kelly (CEO)
- Products: Self-service kiosks; Point of sale software and equipment; Retail store automation; Professional services
- Revenue: ▼US$2.87 billion (2024)
- Operating income: ▲US$—37 million (2024)
- Net income: ▲US$957 million (2024)
- Total assets: ▼US$4.45 billion (2024)
- Total equity: ▲US$933 million (2024)
- Number of employees: 14,000 (2024)
- Website: www.ncrvoyix.com

NCR Voyix Corporation, previously known as NCR Corporation and National Cash Register, is a global software, consulting and technology company providing several professional services and electronic products. It produces self-service kiosks, point-of-sale software and terminals, check processing systems, thermal printers, and barcode scanners.

NCR was founded in Dayton, Ohio, in 1884. It grew to become a dominant market leader in cash registers, then decryption machinery, then computing machinery, and computers over the subsequent 100 years. By 1991, it was still the fifth-largest manufacturer of computers. That year, it was acquired by AT&T.

A restructuring of AT&T in 1996 led to NCR's re-establishment on January 1, 1997, as a separate company and involved the spin-off of Lucent Technologies from AT&T. In June 2009, the company sold most of the Dayton properties and moved its headquarters to the Atlanta metropolitan area, near Duluth. In early January 2018, the new NCR Global Headquarters opened in Midtown Atlanta near Technology Square (adjacent to Georgia Tech).

In October 2023, NCR Corporation was split into two independent public companies: NCR Voyix legally succeeded NCR Corporation, while the ATM business was spun-off as NCR Atleos.

== History ==
=== Early years ===
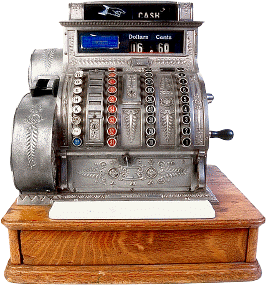
Antique three-column full-keyboard cash register

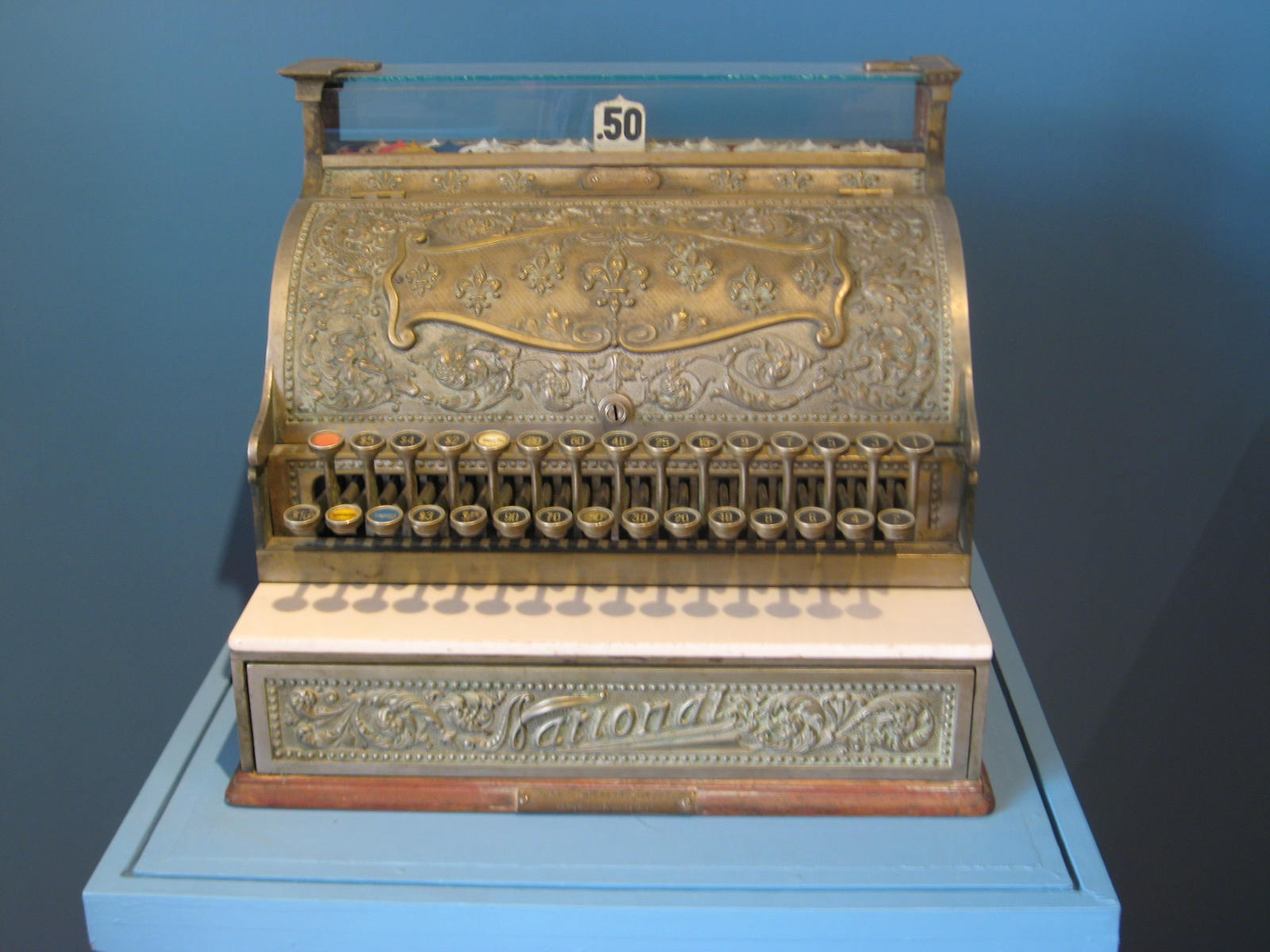
Old National Cash Register on display at the Museo de la Secretaría de Hacienda y Crédito Público in Mexico City

The company began as the National Manufacturing Company of Dayton, Ohio, and was established to manufacture and sell the first mechanical cash register invented in 1879 by James Ritty. In 1884, the company and patents were bought by John Henry Patterson and his brother Frank Jefferson Patterson, and the firm was renamed the National Cash Register Company. Patterson formed NCR into one of the first modern American companies by introducing new, aggressive sales methods and business techniques. He established the first sales training school in 1893 and introduced a comprehensive social welfare program for his factory workers.

In 1899, National Cash Register Company bought patents for improving cash register technology from the dissolving Rochester Cash Register Company, for which trucking executive George F. Roth had been an investor and board member.

Other significant figures in the early history of the company were Thomas J. Watson, Sr., Charles F. Kettering and Edward A. Deeds.

Watson—later fired by Patterson in 1914—eventually worked his way up to general sales manager. At an uninspiring sales meeting, Watson interrupted, saying "The trouble with every one of us is that we don't think enough. We don't get paid for working with our feet — we get paid for working with our heads". Watson then wrote THINK on the easel. Signs with this motto were later erected in NCR factory buildings, sales offices and club rooms during the mid-1890s. "THINK" later became a widely known symbol of IBM, which was created by Watson after he joined the Computing-Tabulating-Recording Company (CTR).

Kettering designed the first cash register powered by an electric motor in 1906. Within a few years he developed the Class 1000 register which was in production for 40 years, and the O.K. Telephone Credit Authorization system for verifying credit in department stores.

Deeds and Kettering went on to found Dayton Engineering Laboratories Company which later became the Delco Electronics Division of General Motors.

In 1913, the company's market share was dominant and it was successfully prosecuted under the Sherman Antitrust Act of 1890. The ruling was appealed and executives avoided at least some of the court's strictures.

=== American Selling Force ===
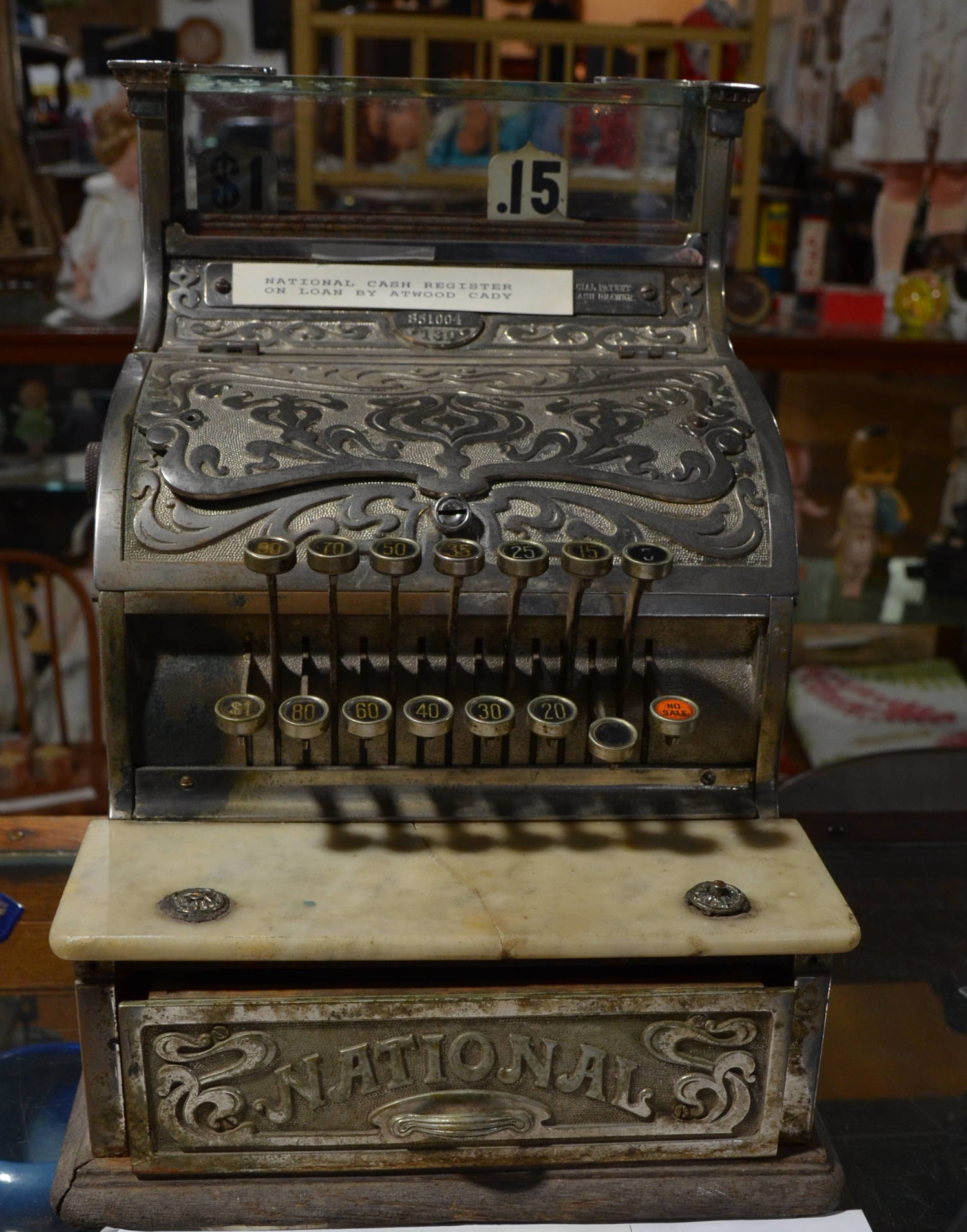
1913 National cash register on display at the Larimore Community Museum in Larimore, North Dakota

When John H. Patterson and his brother took over the company, cash registers were expensive (US$50) and only about a dozen of "Ritty's Incorruptible Cashier" machines were in use. There was little demand for the expensive device, but Patterson believed the product would sell once shopkeepers understood it would drastically decrease theft by salesclerks. He created a sales team known as the "American Selling Force" which worked on commissions and followed a standard sales script, the "N.C.R. Primer." This was the first known sales training manual in existence. The philosophy was to sell a business function rather than just a piece of machinery. Sales demonstrations were set up in hotels (away from the distractions of the buyer's business) depicting a store interior complete with real merchandise and real cash. The sale prospect was described as the "P.P." or "Probable Purchaser." Once initial objections were swept aside and the P.P. admitted to internal theft losses, the product was demonstrated along with large business charts and diagrams. The deal was sealed with a 25 cent cigar.

Patterson also invented the formal sales training academy, a summer event first set up in canvas tents and called "Sugar Camp." The first known form of direct mail advertising also came courtesy of Patterson, who sent mail pieces to a predetermined list of addresses about his products. Patterson's "Get a Receipt" campaign was one of the world's first advertising campaigns.

=== Welfare work ===
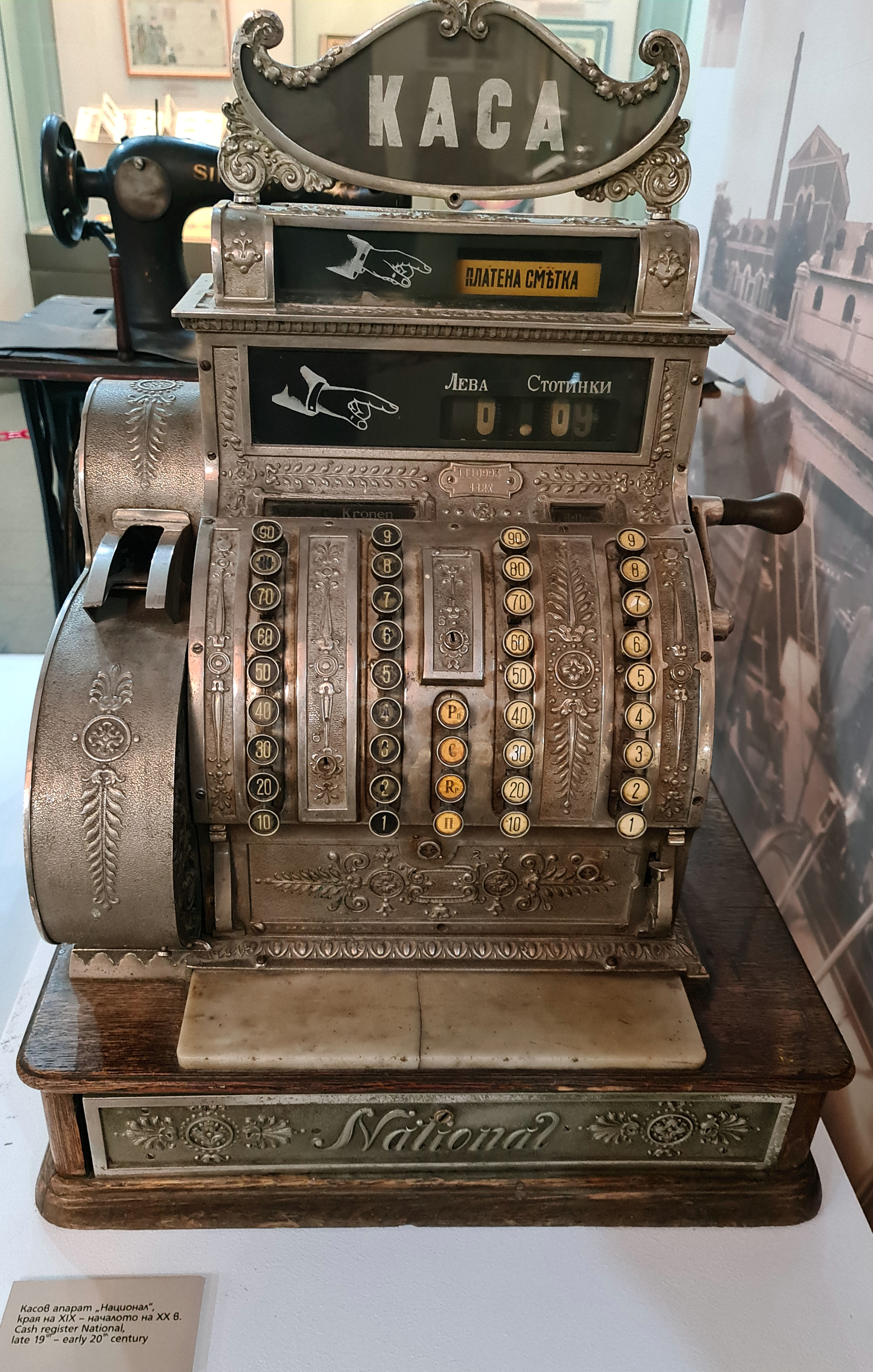
National cash register from the end of the 19th century, National History Museum, Sofia

NCR undertook extensive welfare work and was referred to as "America's model factory." Some historians have referred to company owner John Patterson as the "father of industrial welfare." The company had its own welfare department and is considered a pioneer in America for this work.

Some of the company's welfare initiatives include safety devices, drinking fountains, baths, lockers, chairs and back support for machine operators, indoor bathrooms and a ventilation system to provide clean air. There were special provisions for female employees including restrooms, shorter work hours, high-back chairs, a women's dining room, and lessons in domestic science. In 1893, NCR constructed the first "daylight factory" buildings with floor-to-ceiling glass windows that let in light and could be opened to let in fresh air as well.

=== Expansion ===
NCR expanded quickly and became multi-national in 1888. Between 1893 and 1906 it acquired a number of smaller cash register companies.

By 1911 it had sold one million machines and had grown to almost 6,000 employees. Combined with rigorous legal attacks, Patterson's methods enabled the company to fight off bankruptcy, buy-out over 80 of its early competitors, and achieve control of 95% of the U.S. market.

In 1912 the company was found guilty of violating the Sherman Antitrust Act. Patterson, Deeds, Watson and 25 other NCR executives and managers were convicted of illegal anti-competitive sales practices and were sentenced to one year of imprisonment. Their convictions were unpopular with the public due to the efforts of Patterson and Watson to help those affected by the Dayton, Ohio, floods of 1913, but efforts to have them pardoned by President Woodrow Wilson were unsuccessful. However, their convictions were overturned on appeal in 1915 on the grounds that important defense evidence should have been admitted.

In 1918, the company signed a contract with the US Army to produce 100,000 M1911 pistols for use in World War I. The contract was canceled a few months later after the war ended, with no pistols having been delivered.

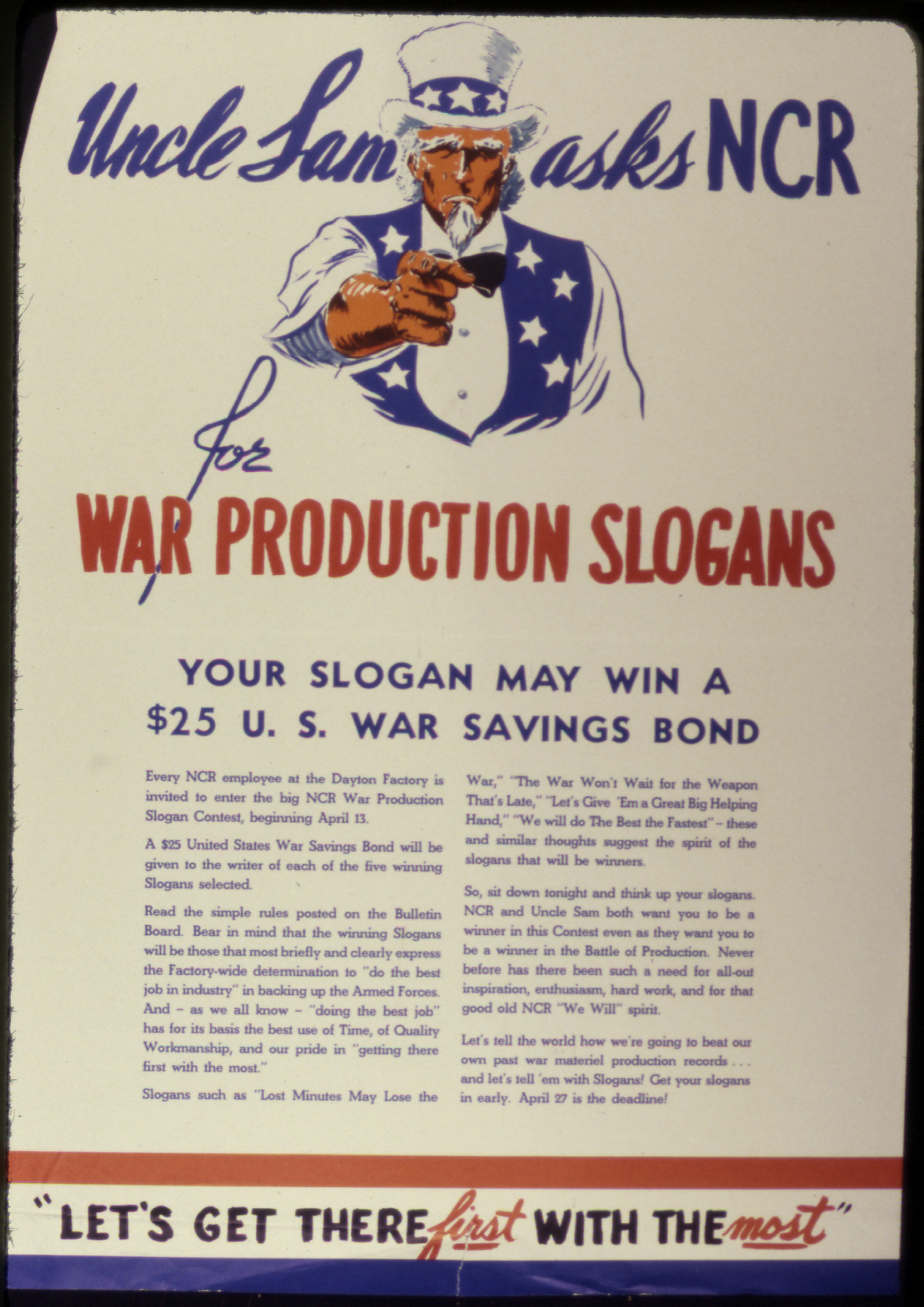
WWII NCR poster

Two million cash register units were sold by 1922, the year John Patterson died. In January, 1926, NCR went public with an issue of $55 million in stock, at that time the largest public offering in United States history. During the first World War, NCR manufactured fuses and aircraft instrumentation, and during World War II built aero-engines, bomb sights and code-breaking machines, including the American bombe designed by Joseph Desch.

==== US Navy Bombe, code breaking machine ====
The US Navy Bombe was built by NCR for the United States Naval Computing Machine Laboratory to decrypt the Enigma machine that encrypted German military messages.

The NCR-made American bombes (decryption machines) were faster, and soon more available, than the British bombes at Bletchley Park and its outstations.

The American bombe was essentially the same as the English bombe, though it functioned better (six times faster) as they were not handicapped by having to make it, as Keen was forced to do owing to production difficulties, on the framework of a three-wheel machine. By late autumn 1943, new American machines were coming into action at the rate of about two a week, the ultimate total being in the region of 125.

=== Post-war ===
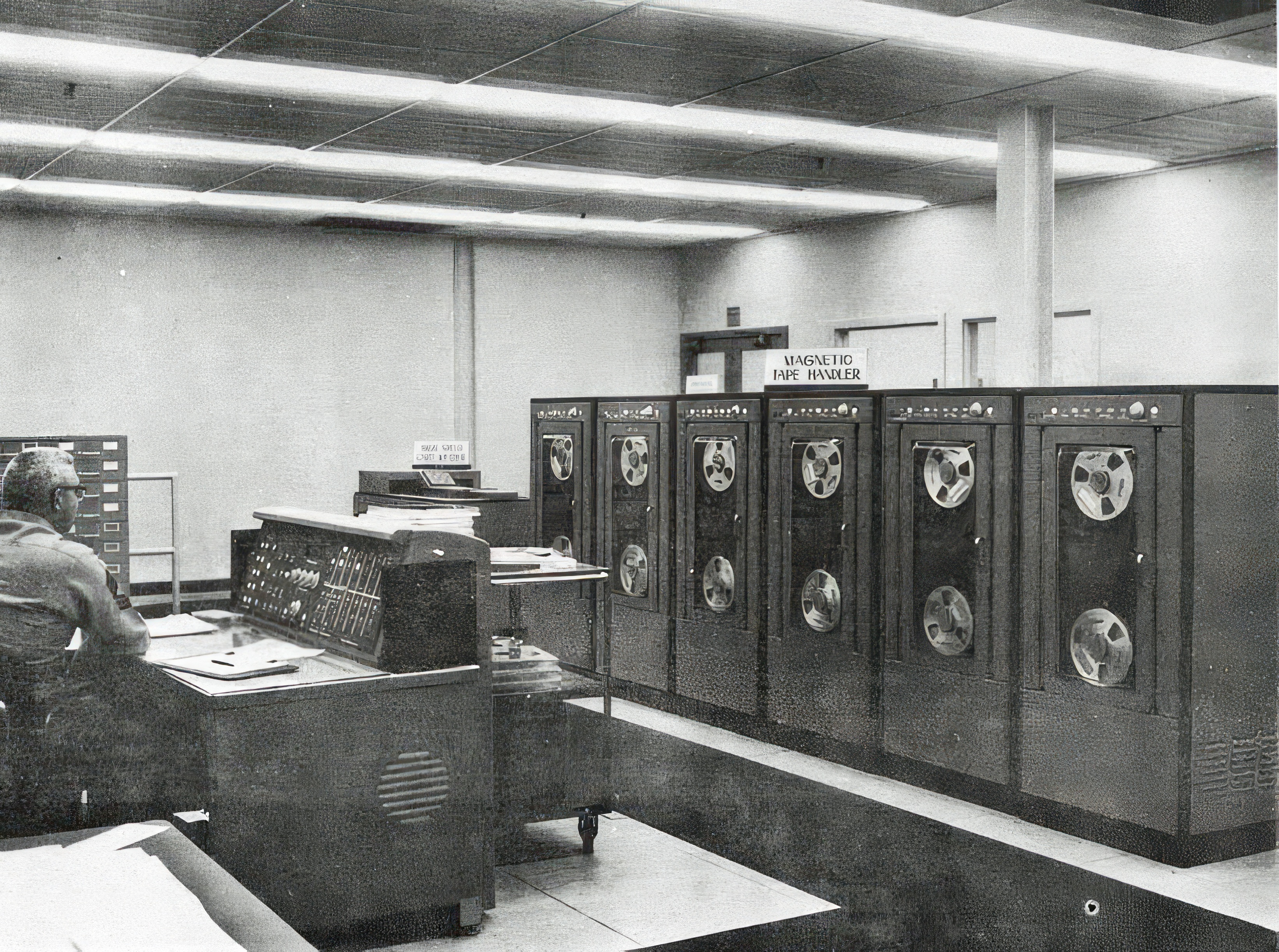
NCR 304 Computer

Building on its wartime experience with secret communication systems, high speed counters and cryptanalytic equipment, NCR became a major post-war force in developing new computing and communications technology.

In 1953, chemists Barrett K. Green and Lowell Schleicher of NCR in Dayton submitted a patent "Pressure responsive record materials" for a carbon-less copy paper. This became US Patent 2,730,457 and was commercialized as "NCR Paper."

In February 1953, the company acquired the Computer Research Corporation (CRC), after which it created a specialized electronics division. In 1956, NCR introduced its first electronic device, the Class 29 Post-Tronic, a bank machine using magnetic stripe technology. With the General Electric Company (now known as GE), the company manufactured its first transistor-based computer in 1957, the NCR 304. Also in the 1950s NCR introduced MICR (magnetic ink character recognition) and the NCR 3100 accounting machines.

In 1962, NCR introduced the NCR 315 Electronic Data Processing System which included the CRAM storage device, the first automated mass storage alternative to magnetic tape libraries accessed manually by computer operators. The NCR 390 and 500 computers were also offered to customers who did not need the full power of the 315. The NCR 390 accepted four types of input: magnetic ledger cards, punched cards, punched tape, and keyboard entry, with a tape read speed of 400 characters a second. The company's first all-integrated circuit computer was the Century 100 of 1968. The Century 200 was added in 1970. The line was extended through the Century 300 in 1973. The Century series was followed by the Criterion series in 1976, NCR's first virtual machine system.

During this period, NCR also produced the 605 minicomputer for in-house use. It was the compute engine for the 399 and 499 accounting machines, several generations of in-store and in-bank controllers, and the 82xx/90xx IMOS COBOL systems. The 605 also powered peripheral controllers, including the 658 disk subsystem and the 721 communications processor.

In 1974, scanners and computers developed by NCR marked the first occasion where items with the Universal Product Code (UPC) was scanned at the checkout of a supermarket, Troy's Marsh Supermarket in Troy, Ohio, a few miles away from NCR's Dayton Headquarters. It was treated as a ceremonial occasion and involved a little bit of ritual. The night before, a team of Marsh's supermarket staff had moved in to put bar codes on hundreds of items in the store while NCR installed their scanners and computers.

In 1982, NCR's Peripheral Products Division in Wichita, Kansas, together with peripheral manufacturer, Shugart Associates, helped propel the computer industry into a new era of intelligent standardized peripheral communications with the development the Small Computer System Interface (SCSI). The SCSI standard enabled such diverse devices as disks, tapes, printers, and scanners to share a common interface to one or more computer systems in a way that was never before possible and a model for subsequent interfaces to follow. NCR developed the world's first SCSI interface chip, the NCR 5380, based on the SCSI interface standard collaboratively developed. In the third quarter of 1982, NCR announced the release of a 32-bit VLSI processor architecture and chipset called NCR/32. These devices were used in several of their 9x00 and System 10000 computer systems.

By 1986, the count of American mainframe computer manufacturers had dwindled from 8 (IBM and the "seven dwarfs," namely Burroughs, UNIVAC, NCR, Control Data, Honeywell, General Electric, and RCA) to 6 (IBM and the "BUNCH") and further reduced to 4 (IBM, Unisys, NCR, and Control Data Corporation).

The adoption of the name NCR Corporation occurred in 1974.

=== Small computers ===
NCR logo from 1985 to 1996; in some cases also co-branded with the AT&T globe logo from 1992 to 1996

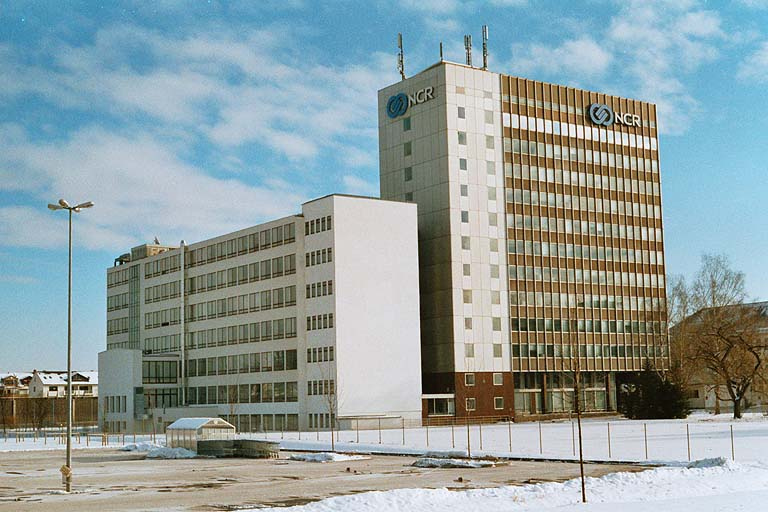
NCR office buildings in Augsburg, Germany

In 1982, NCR became involved in open systems architecture. Its first such system was the UNIX-powered TOWER 16/32, the success of which (approximately 100,000 were sold) established NCR as a pioneer in bringing industry standards and open systems architecture to the computer market. These 5000-series systems were based on Motorola 68k CPUs and supported NCR's proprietary transaction processing system TMX, which was mainly used by financial institutions. This product line also saw the first time NCR had offered its products through other than its own direct sales channels since the early 1900s. Formally added to its company structure in March 1981, NCR's OEM System's Division spearheaded the design, sales revenue and market awareness and acceptance of NCR's Tower family. Part of the cause of this success was the decision by NCR senior management to hire reseller industry veterans for key positions within the fledgling operation and have that unit work with, but not answerable to, NCR's traditional management structure. The industry shift from proprietary minicomputers brought personnel with minicomputer and reseller backgrounds such as division heads Roger Nielsen (ex-Data General), Robert Hahn (ex-Data General), and Dan Kiegler (ex-Datapoint marketing), marketing manager and later Director of Field Sales, Dave Lang (ex-DEC reseller marketing director and salesperson) and other critical contributors at corporate levels; who then hired a complementary field sales organization primarily made up of proven people from DEC, Wang and other faltering minicomputer firms.

In the 1980s, NCR sold various PC compatible AT-class computers, like the small NCR-3390 (called an "intelligent terminal"). They proposed a customized version of MS-DOS named NCR-DOS, which for example offered support for switching the CPU between 6, 8 or 10 MHz speeds. The computers featured an improved CGA adapter, the NGA, which had a 640×400 text mode more suitable for business uses than the original 640×200 mode, with characters drawn using single-pixel-wide lines, giving an appearance similar to that of classic IBM 3270 terminals. The additional four-color 640×400 graphical mode was identical to CGA's 320×200 mode from a programming point of view.

NCR also manufactured two proprietary series of mini-to-midrange computers:

- I-Series: 9010 (IDPS Operating System), 9020 and 9100 (IMOS Operating System), 9040 and 9050 (IRX Operating System), 9200 / 9300 / 9300IP / 9400 / 9400IP / 9500 / System 10000 models 35 / 55 / 65 / 75 (ITX Operating System). These were "I" (Interactive) computers allowing TTY terminals to be connected. Later models supported all industry-standard communication protocols.
- V-Series: 8500 (VRX Operating System) and 9800 (VRX/E Operating System). These were "V" series, comparable to mainframes, supporting "Page mode" terminals. The hardware did have similarities with the I-Series while the operating system and user interface was totally different.

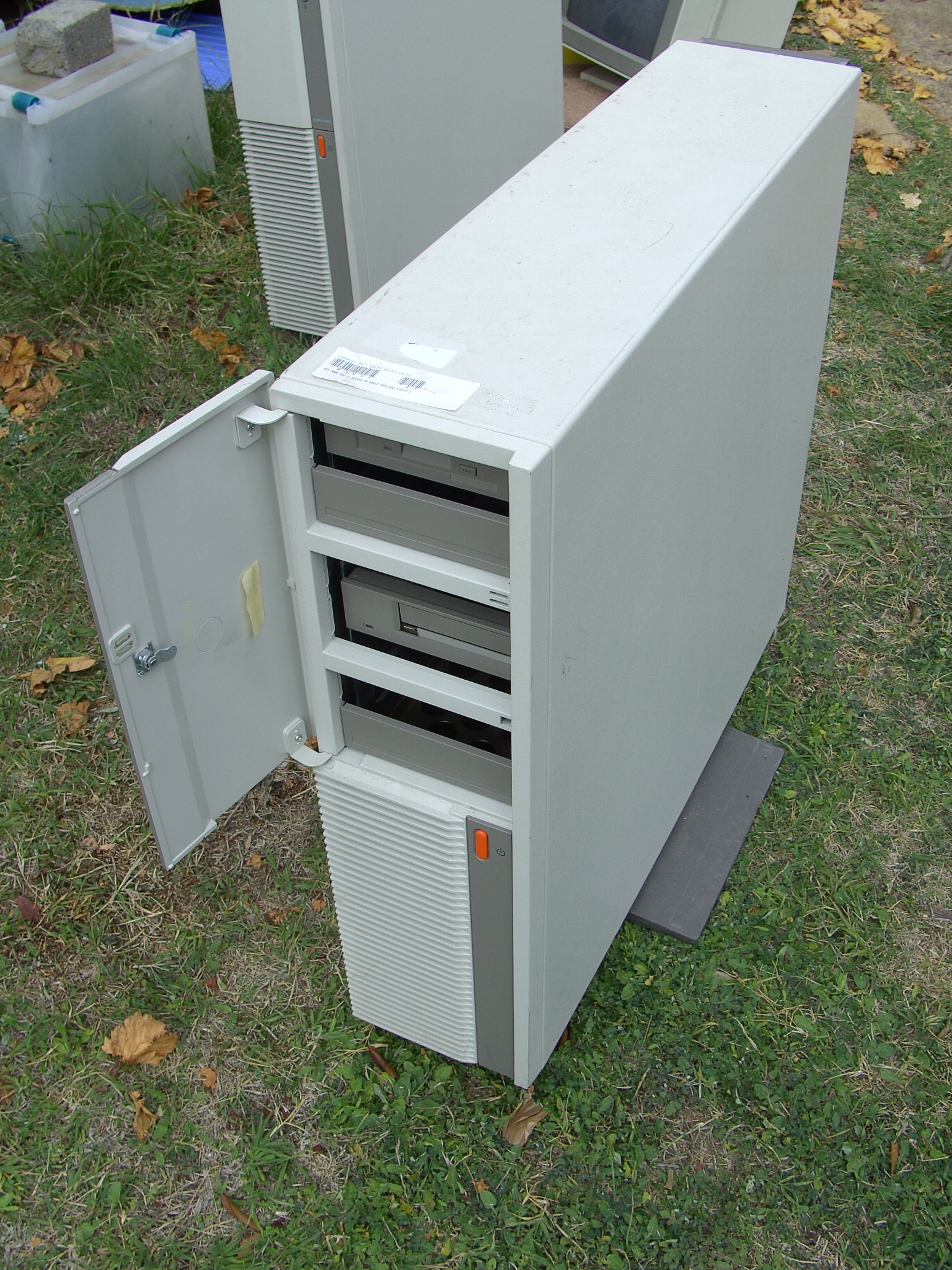
NCR model 3000 class 3434 computer

In 1990, NCR introduced the System 3000, a seven-level family of computers based on Intel's 386 and 486 CPUs. The majority of the System 3000 range utilised IBM's Micro Channel architecture rather than the more prevalent ISA architecture, and utilised SCSI peripherals as well as the more popular parallel and serial port interfaces, resulting in a premium product with premium pricing. The 3600, through NCR subsidiary Applied Digital Data Systems supported both the Pick Operating System and Prime Information.

The 1970s saw the widespread installations of the Model 770 in National Westminster and Barclays banks throughout the UK, but it was not until the Model 5070, developed at its Dundee plant in Scotland and introduced in 1983 that the company began to make more serious inroads into the ATM market. Subsequent models included the 5084, and 58xx (Personas) series. In early 2008, the company launched its new generation of ATMs—the 662x/663x SelfServ series. NCR currently commands over a third of the entire ATM market, with an estimated $18 trillion being withdrawn from NCR ATMs every year. In addition, NCR's expertise in this field led the company to contract with the U.S. military to support the Eagle Cash program with customized ATMs.

==== NCR 5xxx series ====
The NCR 5xxx-series is the range of (ATMs) produced by NCR from the early 1980s. Most models were designed and initially manufactured at its Dundee factory in Scotland, but later produced at several other locations around the world.

There have been several distinct generations:

- 50xx-series; The initial models introduced in 1983 were the 5070 (interior vestibule) and 5080 (Through The Wall or TTW) introduced a number of features which have become standard among ATMs. Most notably, the individual functions of the ATM are divided among discrete modules which can be easily removed and replaced for repair or replenishment. The 5080 featured the standard anti-vandal smoked perspex screen which covered the keypad and screen until the cardholder inserted their card. The enhanced 5084 TTW model appeared in 1987, and had an improved anti-vandal fascia and was the first ATM to dispense with the need for the retracting perspex screen. The 5085 offered the first crude deposit function; with the machine supplying the deposit envelopes which were subsequently stored in the machine's safe for subsequent back office processing.
- 56xx-series; produced from 1991 to 1997. Enhanced functions such as color displays and improved security and usability functions became available. The introduction of Media Entry Indicators (MEI) which highlight the card entry slot to the customer was also a part of this series. Some 56xx machines produced between 1994 and 1996 were badged as "AT&T" rather than "NCR", mirroring the company's brief ownership under the telecoms giant in the mid-1990s. 56xx models have included the 5670 (interior lobby cash dispense only), 5675 (interior lobby multifunction—dispense & deposit), 5684 (exterior TTW dispense only), 5688 (exterior TTW drive-up multifunction) and 5685 (exterior TTW multifunction).
- 58xx-series marketed as Personas from 1998 until 2008. These models were characterised by the gradual move towards greater ATM functionality including intelligent, envelopeless deposit by means of automated check recognition modules, coin dispense, and electronic cash recognition functions which allows bank customers to deposit cash and checks with instant processing of the transaction. The 58xx series has also been characterised by the gradual introduction of liquid-crystal displays (LCDs) instead of the traditional CRT monitor. Models have included the 5870 (compact interior lobby dispense only), 5873 (interior lobby with cash accept & deposit only), 5874 (Exterior TTW cash dispense), 5875 (Multifunction TTW). The latest TTW versions of the Personas line, introduced in 2000 and marketed as M-Series added functions such as cash recycling, coin dispense, barcode reading, a larger 12" LCD with touchscreen option, and for the first time, a common wall footprint for both the Multifunction (5886) or single function (5887). Owing to the growth of drive-through bank traffic, a custom 5890 drive-up ATM was also released, designed to be installed outside with no need for a bunker. This unit had a dual safe design that could house both a currency dispenser and note acceptor in the larger left-hand safe, and a cheque acceptor or envelope depositor in the smaller right-hand safe.

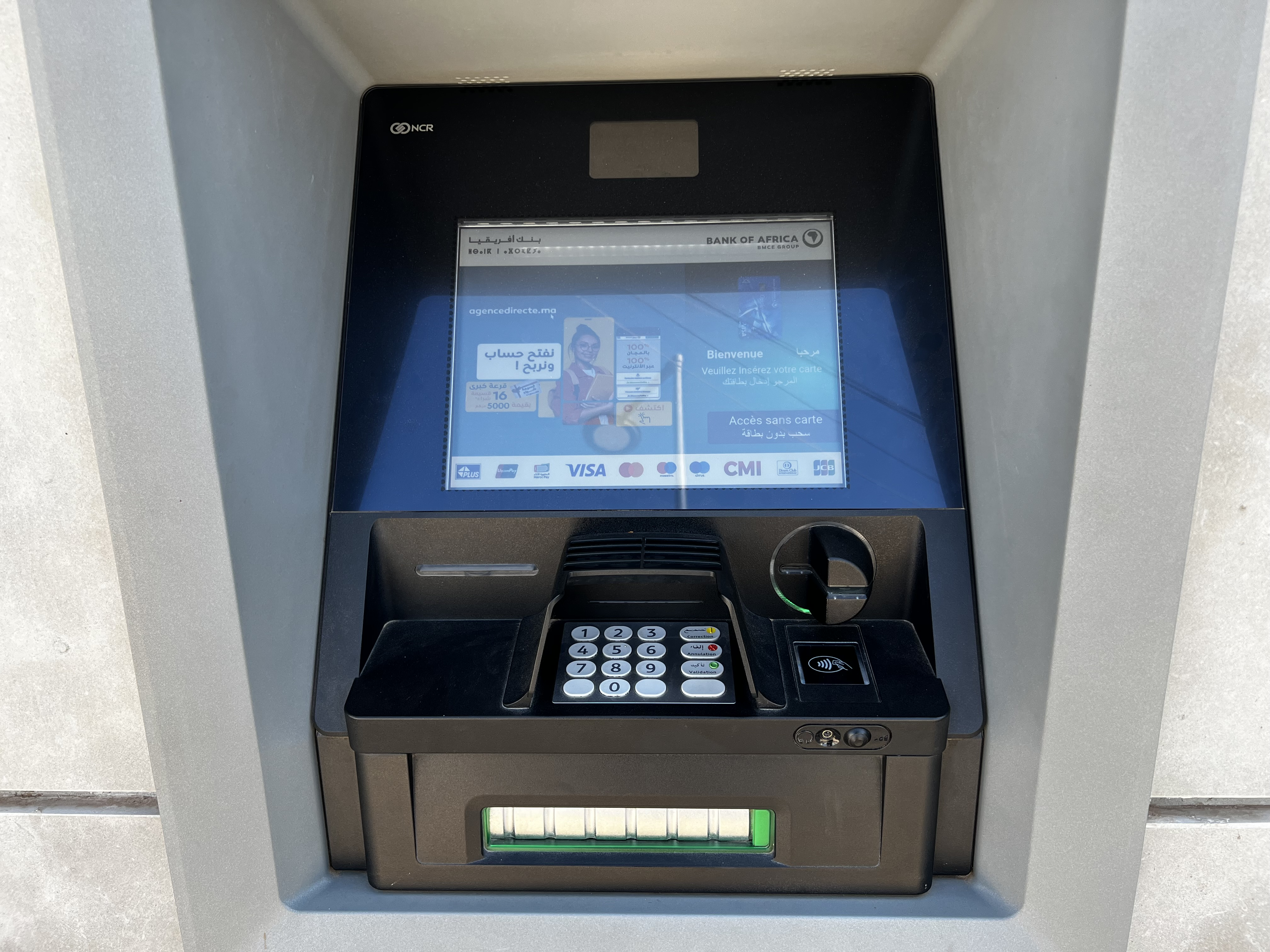
NCR ATM at a Bank of Africa branch in Morocco

==== NCR 66XX series ====
NCR's 6th generation of ATMs have been noted for the further move towards intelligent deposit and the expansion of secondary functions such as barcode reading.

- 667x-series marketed under the Personas M-Series brand were sold from 2005 to 2010. These models consist of the 6676 (interior lobby multifunction) and 6674 (through-the-wall multifunction). The design language is very different from the original Personas model; for example, on the front-access 6676s, the entire front cover is opened upwards in a clamshell design, which was designed to save space both for installation and servicing.

==== NCR Self-Serv 20 and 30 series ====
NCR's latest ATM services, introduced in 2008.

This series is a complete redesign of both outlook and technological contents. It is also a cost down product.

Self-Serv 20 series are single-function (e.g. cash-out) ATMs, while Self-Serv 30 series are full-function (cash-out and intelligent deposit) machines.

==== NCR Atleos 668x / 20xx machines ====
Starting in 2015, the SelfServ series was updated with new design language (called MFR or Multi-Function Refresh), modernizing the look of the product line. This corresponded with a change in class numbers, from the 20/30 series to the 80 Series (6681 kiosk model, 6682 lobby model, 6684 through-the-wall model, and 6688 island / drive-through model).

Next-generation dispensers, depositors, high-resolution display panels and anti-skimming technology are all standard with the MFR units.

In 2021, the 206x and 208x line of products was released, incorporating cash recycling technology.

=== AT&T ===
==== Acquisition by AT&T ====
NCR was acquired by AT&T Corporation on September 19, 1991, for $7.4 billion and was joined with Teradata Corporation on February 28, 1992. As an AT&T subsidiary, its 1992 year-end headcount was 53,800 employees and contractors. By 1993, the subsidiary produced a year-end $1.287 billion net loss on $7.265 billion in revenue. The net losses continued in 1994 and 1995, losses that required repeated subsidies from the parent company and resulted in a 1995 year-end headcount of 41,100. During these three years, AT&T was the former NCR's largest customer, accounting for over $1.5 billion in revenue.

On February 15, 1995, the company sold its microelectronics division and storage systems division to Hyundai Electronics (now SK Hynix) who renamed it Symbios Logic. At the time it was the largest purchase of an American company by a Korean company.

For a while, starting in 1994, the subsidiary was renamed AT&T Global Information Solutions, but in 1995, AT&T decided to spin off the company, and at the start of 1996, changed its name back to NCR in preparation for the spin-off. The company outlined its reasons for the spin-off in an Information Statement sent to its stockholders, which cited, in addition to "changes in customer needs" and "need for focused management time and attention", the following:

...[A]dvantages of vertical integration [which had motivated ATT's earlier acquisition of NCR] are outweighed by its costs and disadvantages....[T]o varying degrees, many of the actual and potential customers of Lucent and NCR are or will be competitors of AT&T's communications services businesses. NCR believes that its efforts to target the communications industry have been hindered by the reluctance of AT&T's communications services competitors to make purchases from an AT&T subsidiary.

The newly renamed NCR commissioned the renowned graphic designer Saul Bass to design its new logo and corporate identity as one of his final projects before his death in April 1996, and subsequently re-emerged as a stand-alone company on January 1, 1997.

==== Teradata merger and spin-off ====
NCR had partnered with Teradata in 1990. After AT&T acquired NCR, it also acquired Teradata and made into a unit of NCR. Mark Hurd took over the company's Teradata division in 1999 and is credited with expanding NCR's Teradata business. Hurd streamlined operations and invested in research. The Teradata division at NCR became profitable in 2002. In 2007, NCR split Teradata into its own company.

=== Independence ===
NCR logo used from 1996 to 2023, designed by Saul Bass. Last logo by Saul Bass before his death in 1996. Still in use as the public-facing logo on newer NCR Voyix and NCR Atleos equipment.

One of NCR's first significant acquisitions after becoming independent from AT&T came in July 1997, when it purchased Compris Technologies, a privately held company in Kennesaw, Georgia that produced software for restaurant chains. In November 1997, NCR purchased Dataworks Inc., a 60-person privately held company in San Antonio, Texas.

The Montgomery County Historical Society and NCR Corporation joined in 1998 into a partnership committed to preserving the historic and voluminous NCR Archive. In 1999, NCR moved an estimated three million items from NCR's Building 28 into the Historical Society's Research Center.

In 1998, NCR sold its computer hardware manufacturing assets to Solectron and ceased to produce general-purpose computer systems, focusing instead on the retail and financial industries. In 2000, NCR acquired customer relationship management provider Ceres Integrated Solutions and services company 4Front Technologies. Recent acquisitions include self-service companies Kinetics, InfoAmerica and Galvanon, and software company DecisionPoint.

In April 2003, NCR purchased Copient Technologies, an Indiana-based retail marketing software company.

CEO Lars Nyberg announced his resignation from the company in February 2003 in order to address family matters. NCR promoted Mark Hurd to replace Nyberg as CEO in March 2003. Early on in his new role, Hurd made changes in order to cut costs, including layoffs and converting an executive parking lot into an ATM training center. Within his first year as CEO, the company's stock doubled and NCR became a market leader in ultra high-end data-warehousing software.

=== Bill Nuti's management ===
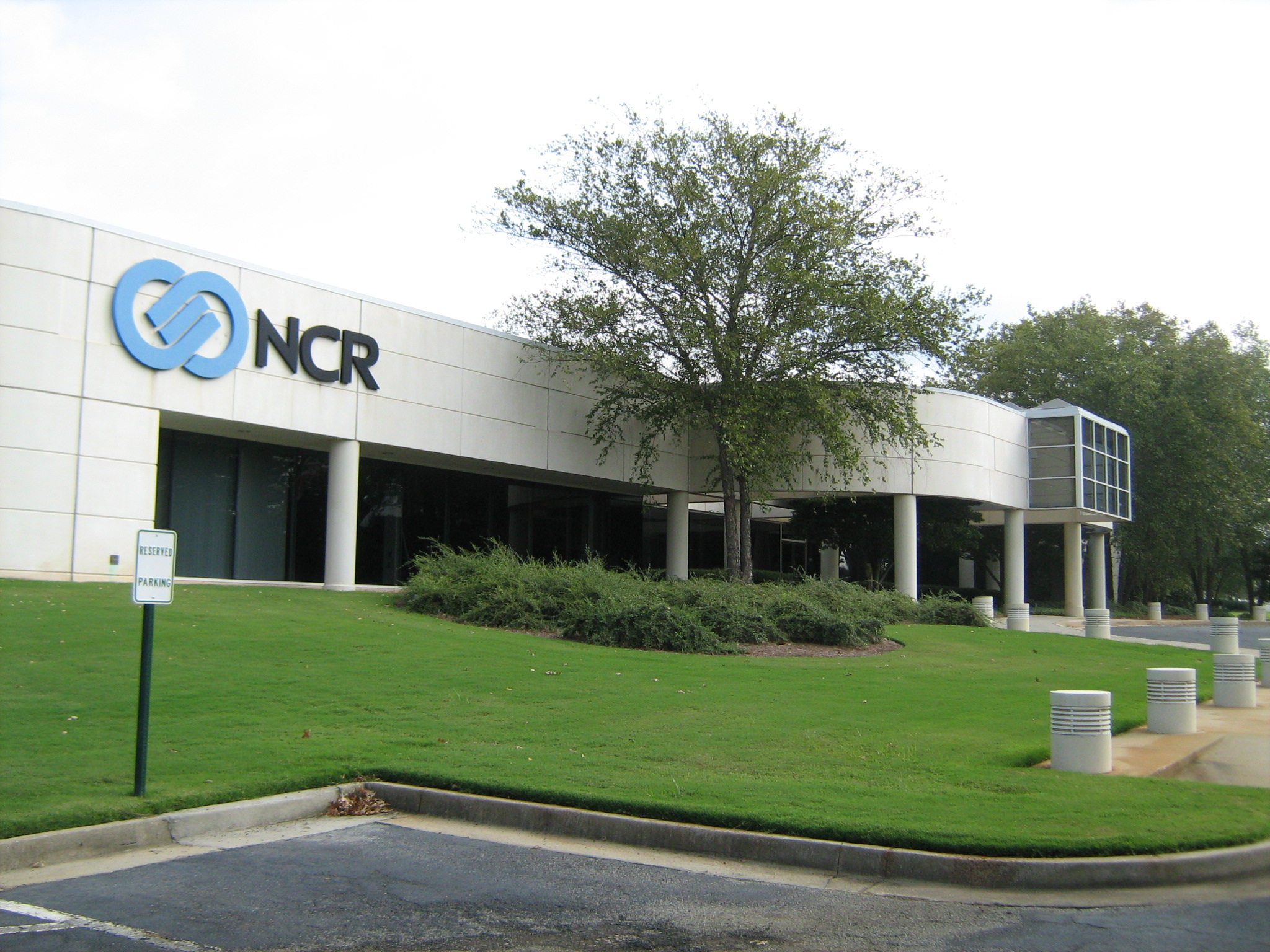
NCR office building near Duluth, Georgia

Bill Nuti became CEO of NCR in 2005. Prefiguring later tensions with Dayton, Nuti did not move to live in Dayton himself, as initially required by his contract.

In 2006, NCR acquired software company IDVelocity and the ATM manufacturing division of Tidel, a cash security equipment manufacturer specializing in retail markets.

On January 8, 2007, NCR announced its intention to separate into two independent companies by spinning off Teradata to shareholders. Bill Nuti would continue his role as president and CEO of NCR, while Teradata Senior VP Mike Koehler would assume leadership of Teradata. On October 1, 2007, NCR Corporation and Teradata jointly announced the Teradata business unit spin-off was complete, with Michael Koehler as the first CEO of Teradata.

On January 11, 2007, NCR announced plans to restructure its entire ATM manufacturing operations, with 650 jobs at its Dundee plant being cut. A further 450 jobs were cut in Waterloo, Ontario, Canada. In 2009, the Dundee manufacturing facility was closed, along with plants in São Paulo and Budapest, citing global economic conditions.

NCR extended its self-service portfolio into the digital media market with the January 2007 announcement of NCR Xpress Entertainment, a multichannel entertainment kiosk. NCR's acquisition of Touch Automation LLC was announced on December 31, 2007.

On October 15, 2008, NCR announced a global reseller partnership with Experticity, a Seattle based software company.

In 2009, NCR relocated its corporate headquarters from Dayton, Ohio to near Duluth, Georgia; Dayton had served as NCR's home for 125 years. Georgia had offered $60 million in incentives for the move; Ohio leaders complained that they were not even asked to match this. CEO Bill Nuti would later say that the headquarters relocation was "a great move for NCR".

In 2009, NCR became the second largest DVD Kiosk operator in North America with the acquisitions of The New Release and DVD Play. In 2010, NCR completed the acquisition of digital signage company, Netkey.

In August 2011, NCR purchased Radiant Systems, a hospitality and retail systems company, for US$1.2 billion. Radiant's hospitality division turned into a new Hospitality Line of Business within NCR. Radiant's petroleum and convenience retail business became part of its retail line of business. Several Radiant executives remained on board, including Scott Kingsfield, who was a general manager of NCR's Retail Line of Business and left NCR in 2014, and Andy Heyman, who became general manager of NCR's Financial Services line of business.

In August 2012, the company was hit with charges of avoiding U.S. economic sanctions against Syria, greatly affecting its stock price.

In February 2013, NCR completed its acquisition of Retalix (NASDAQ: RTLX), a provider of retail software and services, for approximately $650 million in cash.

In January 2014, NCR completed its acquisition of Digital Insight Corporation, a provider of online and mobile banking to mid-market financial institutions, from equity firm Thoma Bravo, LLC for $1.65 billion in cash.

In September 2016, Mark Benjamin was named president and chief operating officer of NCR. Benjamin is a 24-year veteran of human resources management and will report directly to Bill Nuti.

=== Relocation and split-off ===
In January 2018, NCR relocated its corporate headquarters from near Duluth, Georgia to a new office in Midtown Atlanta.

In April 2018, Mike Hayford was named CEO. He led the company's strategic shift from hardware provider to software- and services-led enterprise technology provider.

In October 2018, NCR announced an agreement to purchase payment processor JetPay. This has allowed NCR to offer unified POS and payment packages to SMBs.

In 2019, NCR announced plans to start building a campus in Belgrade, Serbia.

In January 2021, NCR reached an agreement to acquire ATM operator Cardtronics in a deal valued at $2.5 billion.

In October 2021, NCR's largest IT center and campus in Europe was opened in New Belgrade, Serbia.

On September 16, 2022, NCR announced it would split its Digital Commerce and ATM businesses in two separate companies. The split was completed on October 16, 2023. Their names were unveiled on July 24, 2023, with Digital Commerce business being named NCR Voyix and ATM business being named NCR Atleos.

On August 6, 2024, NCR Voyix announced a definitive agreement to sell its cloud-based digital banking business to Veritas Capital for $2.45 Billion. The transaction was approved by NCR Voyix's board of directors and is expected to close by year-end 2024, but remains subject to customary closing conditions and regulatory approvals. The digital-first banking platform was a pioneer in online and mobile banking.

== Products and services ==
NCR's R&D activity is split between its three major centers in Atlanta (retail); Dundee, Scotland (financial industry); and Waterloo, Ontario. It also has R&D centers in Beijing; Cebu, Philippines; Belgrade, Serbia; Banja Luka, Bosnia and Herzegovina and Puducherry Chengalpattu and Hyderabad, India. NCR also has manufacturing facilities in Beijing, Budapest, and the Indian territory of Puducherry and Chengalpattu which is a regional manufacturing and export hub.

=== Hardware ===
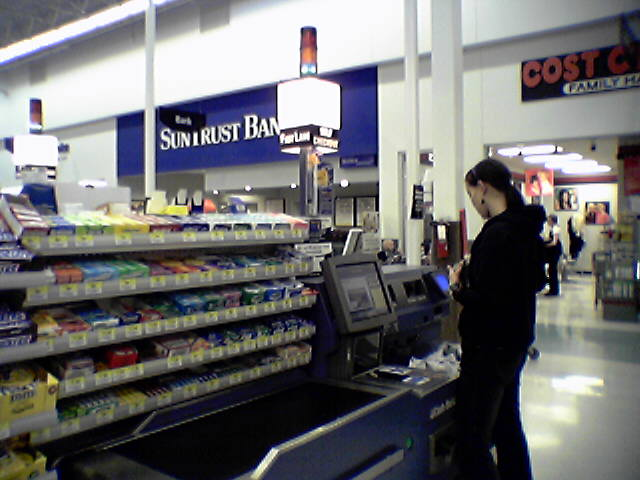
NCR FastLane in use at a Virginia Walmart store

- Item Processing platforms (mainly checks) (7780, iTRAN 8000, iTRAN 300e, iTRAN 180e, iTRAN 300es, iTRAN 180es, TS)
- PCs (System 3000)
- Point of Sale (POS) for retail and food service
  - POS Displays
  - POS Printers
  - POS Touch Screens
  - POS Terminals
    - NCR Silver, complete point-of-sale that runs on iPad, iPhone or iPod touch device
  - POS Self-Checkout (NCR SelfServ Checkout, formerly NCR FastLane)
  - POS Scanners
- Self-service hardware, ATMs and kiosks (EasyPoint, Personas, SelfServ)
- Servers (S1600, S2600, System 5000, Tower)
- Petroleum POS Optic 12, Optic 5

=== Services ===
- E-business
- Education
- IT infrastructure services
- Managed services
- Payment
- Retail
- Self-service

=== NCR Self-Service ===
NCR's Self-Service subsidiary develops self-service software and hardware travel technology. Solutions for hardware include the TouchPort II C for airline check-in and ResortPort for hospitality self-service. Common Use Self-Service technology simplifies the check-in process by allowing passengers one common point of access for check-in. NCR Self-Service, LLC, was founded as Kinetics in Lake Mary, Florida. NCR acquired the company in 2004.

=== Obsolete ===
- Class 1000 register
- Class 2000 bank posting machine (c. 1922–1973)
- NCR 2170 Retail System point of sale terminal and software
- NCR Voyager, an i386 SMP computer platform that preceded Intel's SMP specification
- Electronic shelf labels (RealPrice – discontinued 2008)
- EasyPoint Mini, a touchscreen device originated by Copient Technologies
- Class 50xx, 56xx (4th generation), and 58xx/667x (5th generation) series ATM's

== Senior management ==
- CEO: James G. Kelly (February 2025 – present)
- CEO: David Wilkinson (October 2023 – February 2025)
- CEO: Michael Hayford (April 2018 – October 2023)
- CEO: Bill Nuti (August 2005 – 2018)
- CEO: Mark Hurd (2003–2005)
- CEO: Lars Nyberg (1996–2003)
- CEO: Jerre Stead (1993–1995) company renamed AT&T GIS
- CEO: Charles E. Exley, Jr. (1983–1993)
- CEO: William S. Anderson (1973–1984)
- CEO: Robert S. Oelman (1962–1973)
- CEO: Stanley C. Allyn (1957–1962)
- CEO: Edward A. Deeds (1931–1957)
- CEO: Frederick Beck Patterson (1922–1931)
- CEO: John H. Patterson (1884–1922)
- Interim CEO: Jim Ringler (2005)
- Interim CEO: Bill O'Shea (1995)
- Interim CEO: Gil Williamson (1993)

== See also ==
- NCR Book Award
