= Retalix =

Former Israeli software company

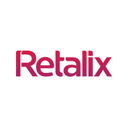

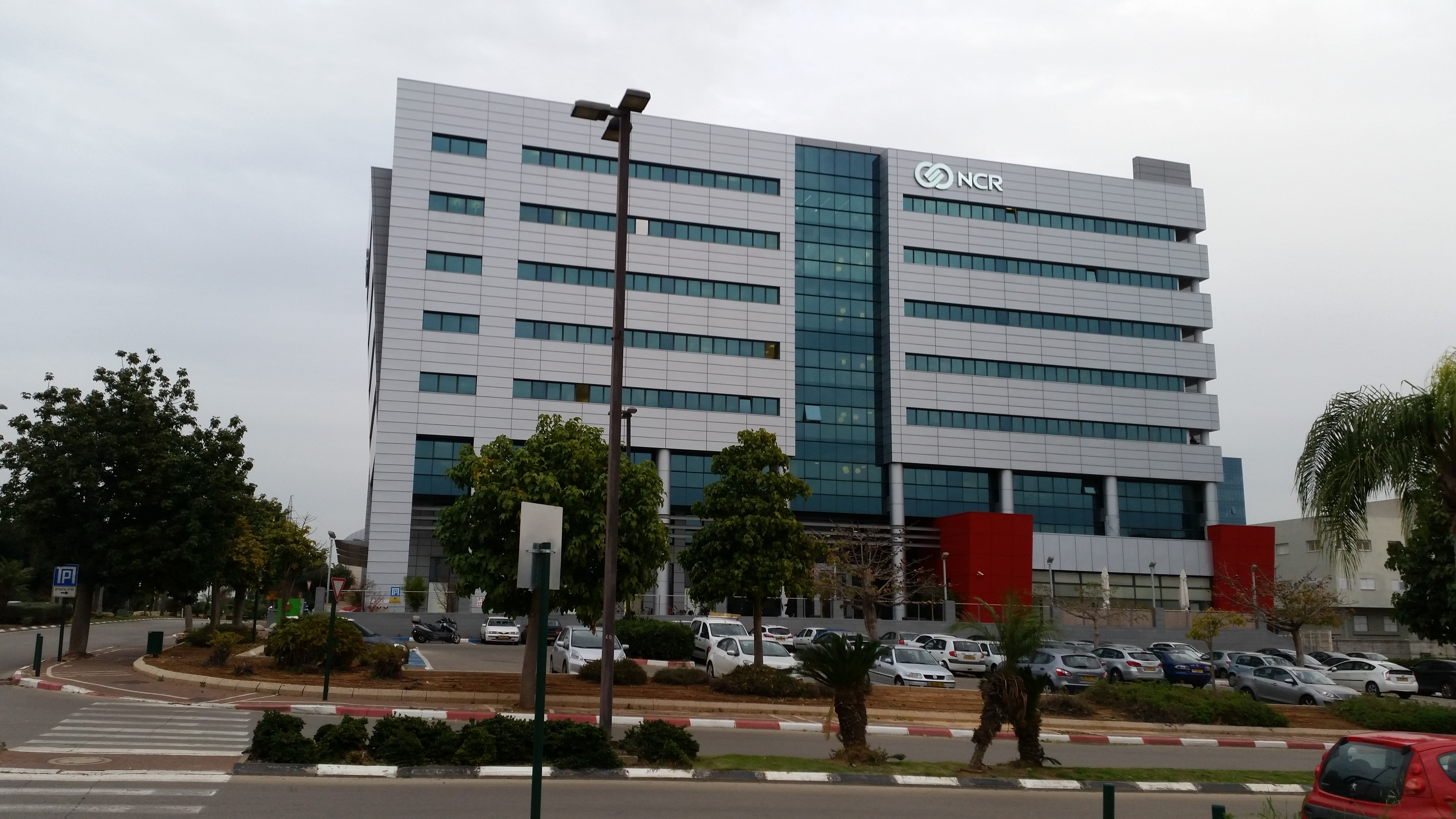
- Company type: Private
- Industry: Computer software
- Founded: 1982; 44 years ago
- Headquarters: Ra'anana, Israel
- Revenue: ▲USD 236 million (2011)
- Net income: ▲USD 13.7 million (2011, GAAP), USD 19.4 million (2011, Adjusted)
- Parent: NCR Corporation

Retalix Ltd. is a former Israeli software company that developed, licensed, implemented and supported software applications for retailers, wholesalers and distributors of fast-moving consumer goods, mainly in the grocery, convenience store, and foodservice industries.

Retalix software includes point of sale, retail operations, customer loyalty, supply chain management (SCM), warehouse management (WMS), and transportation management (TMS). In 2011, Retalix was ranked among the top four software vendors for grocery retailers and among the top ten large software vendors to retailers.

Retalix was established in 1982 by Barry Shaked and Brian Cooper as Point of Sale Ltd.

Retalix was headquartered in Ra'anana, Israel, Retalix's North American headquarters was located in Plano, Texas. Retalix also operated offices in the UK, France, Italy, Australia, and Japan. In February 2013, Retalix was acquired by NCR Corporation.

== Company history ==
Since its inception until the mid-1990s, the company focused on the development and sale of store-level software solutions to grocery retailers. During the late 1990s, the company widened its offerings to cover also solutions for the fuel and convenience retail market, as well as solutions covering the management of retail operations at the chain level. In 2000, the company changed its name from "Point Of Sale Ltd" to "Retalix Ltd", to reflect the expansion of its solutions offering beyond the store level.

On March 27, 2006, Retalix Ltd. restated its second- and third-quarter results on accounting issues, reducing revenue and earnings in both periods.

Retalix's growth strategy has been to expand its enterprise and supply chain management applications while maintaining close integration with its widely installed, in-store solutions. It has grown both organically and through acquisition. In 2004 Retalix acquired OMI International, a warehouse management system (WMS) and supply chain management (SCM) vendor that was also focused on the retail food sector. The company continued with its growth strategy in 2005 through the acquisition of IDS, which expanded its offerings to include enterprise software for wholesale distributors. Also in 2005, Retalix acquired TCI Solutions, a software provider for grocery retailers in the area of store and headquarters management and operations. In recent years, Retalix introduced new solutions complementing current retail industry focuses, such as customer loyalty and optimization of ordering.

Between 1994 and 2013, Retalix was a public company. The company's ordinary shares traded on the NASDAQ Global Select Market under the symbol RTLX. The company's shares also traded in the Tel Aviv Stock Exchange (TASE). Retalix was listed on the Tel-Tech 15 Index, the TASE's leading technology index, as well as on the TA-100 Index, consisting of the TASE's top 100 stocks by market capitalization. In November 2012, it was announced that NCR Corporation had agreed to acquire Retalix for $650 million, or $30 per share. The acquisition was completed in February 2013, subsequent to which Retalix was delisted from both the Nasdaq and the TASE.

== Customers ==
Retalix software is used by grocery and convenience store retailers, petrol stations and quick-service restaurants as well as by foodservice, convenience and grocery wholesale distributors. Among the company's customers are eight of the top 25 worldwide food retailers.

Retalix software has been installed at approximately 70,000 sites in 51 countries. Retalix customers include as Tesco, Carrefour, Delhaize, Intermarche, Morrisons, Sainsbury’s, Jumbo and Argos in Europe; Target Canada; Woolworths, Coles and Metcash in Australia; Food Lion, Hannaford Bros., Hy-Vee, Costco, K-VA-T Food City, Big Y, Save-A-Lot, and Save Mart in the United States; large convenience store and fuel retailers, such as BP in Australia, the UK, and North America; the Reitan group in Scandinavia, PetroChina and Reliance in Asia; Casey's, Husky, Irving, Love's, Pilot Travel Centers, and The Pantry in North America; and large health and beauty retailers such as Walgreens in the United States and A.S. Watson Group in Europe and Asia.
