= Carrick Borough Building =

Historic building in Pittsburgh, Pennsylvania, US

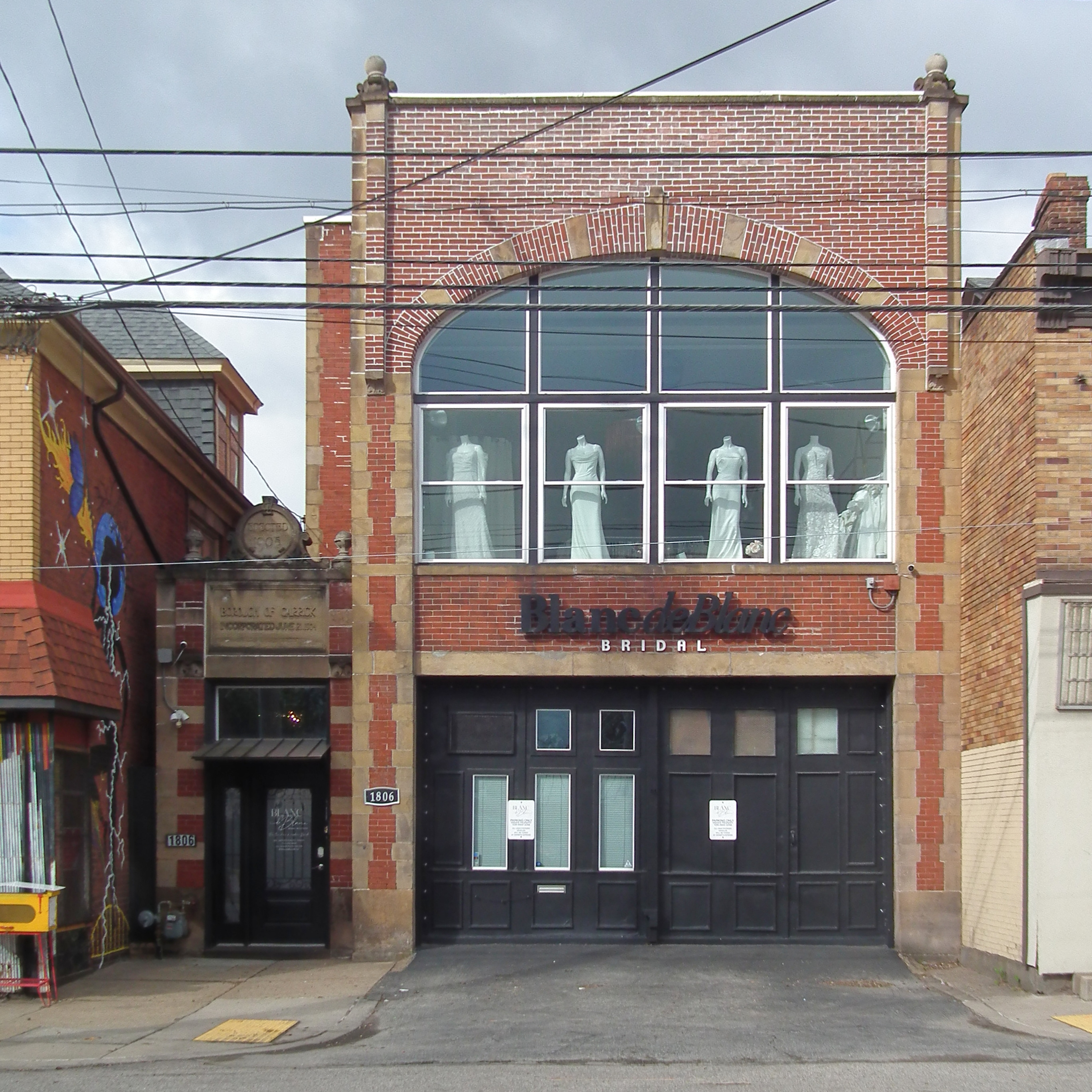

- Location within Pittsburgh
- 40°23′49″N 79°59′17″W
- Location: 1806 Brownsville Rd. Pittsburgh, Pennsylvania

History
- Built: 1905–06

Site notes
- Architect: Edward Stotz

The Carrick Borough Building or Carrick Municipal Building is a historic building in the Carrick neighborhood of Pittsburgh, Pennsylvania. It was built in 1905–06, shortly after Carrick was organized as a borough, and housed the town's municipal government, volunteer fire department, and jail. After Carrick was annexed into the city of Pittsburgh in 1927, the building remained in use as a fire station until 1957 and has since been converted to commercial use. The Borough Building was designed by Edward Stotz in an eclectic style with strong Dutch Revival influences. It was nominated as a Pittsburgh historic landmark by Preservation Pittsburgh in October 2018 and the designation was approved in April 2019.

== History ==
Historically a sparsely developed agricultural and mining community, Carrick began to urbanize around the turn of the 20th century. Lots were laid out, residents built stately homes like the Wigman House, and a spirit of progress and optimism pervaded the community. By 1906, it had over 4,000 residents. In 1904, Carrick was officially organized as a borough in order to provide better services for its residents. One of the new borough's first orders of business was to construct a building "to be used as a house for Fire Company, Town Hall, and for other Borough purposes." The Carrick Borough Council commissioned Edward Stotz to design the building and purchased a lot on Brownsville Road for $20,000. Construction of the building was officially authorized in March 1905.

The completed Borough Building was dedicated on June 21, 1906, the second anniversary of the borough's founding. The occasion was marked with speeches, fireworks, and a parade. The Pittsburgh Press described the new building on its completion:

The Carrick fire company, which is one of the best equipped in the State, will occupy half of the new $15,000 building. On the ground floor is the apparatus room containing two hose reels, one of them a two-wheeled vehicle and the other a four-wheeled one, and a large hook and ladder truck. In the rear is a finely equipped gymnasium and reading room and the basement is fitted up with shower and tub baths for the fire-fighters. The borough jail is also in the basement and the council chamber, and office of the clerk and engineer are on the second floor.

The Borough Building continued to house Carrick's local government until 1927, when the borough was annexed into the city of Pittsburgh. Afterwards, the fire department was left as the only tenant, becoming Engine Company No. 23 of the Pittsburgh Bureau of Fire. In 1933, the building's 40-foot (12 m) tower and bell were removed because of safety concerns. The bell had previously been rung to call out the volunteer firefighters and to signal the borough's nightly 9 pm curfew, but after 1926 it was only used for special occasions like New Year's Eve. The fire department moved to a new location in 1957 and the Borough Building was eventually converted to commercial use.

== Architecture ==
The Borough Building is a two-story brick and stone building situated on the west side of Brownsville Road. It is about 29 feet (8.8 m) wide, occupying most of its 30-foot (9.1 m) lot, and is set back 10 feet (3.0 m) from the sidewalk. The building stands on the side of a hill and has a basement which opens at ground level in the rear due to the topography. It was originally freestanding, but now adjoins the neighboring building to its right. The architecture is eclectic, drawing heavily on Dutch Revival. It was the work of well-known Pittsburgh architect Edward Stotz, whose other notable designs include Schenley High School, Fifth Avenue High School, and the Church of the Epiphany.

The principal facade consists of a narrow, one-story entrance bay alongside a larger two-story bay. On the ground floor, the entirety of the main bay is occupied by the former fire truck entrance, which has wooden slat garage doors and a stone lintel. The second floor is dominated by a large arched window opening onto the former council chamber. It was originally divided into six panes in a 2×3 grid, but has since been replaced with four modern double-hung windows with fixed panes overhead. The arch above the window has alternating brick and stone voussoirs and rests on brick piers with stone quoins on both the inside and outside corners. The inner quoins terminate at the springers of the arch, while those on the outside continue to the roofline. Above the springers, subtly projecting vertical bands of alternating brick and stonework extend to the parapet, terminating in plinths that originally held ball finials. The finials are still extant but were moved farther back on the roof. The original tall, curvilinear parapet has been truncated.

The entrance bay is about 7 feet (2.1 m) wide and slightly recessed. The entryway itself occupies most of the bay and is set between piers with alternating bands of brick and stone terminating in ball finials. A stone slab inscribed "Borough of Carrick Incorporated June 21, 1904" sits above the door and transom light. The bay is crowned with a stone pediment with carved scrollwork and a medallion inscribed with the construction date. The 40-foot (12 m) tower that originally stood at the rear of the building is no longer extant.
