= Stotz =

Stotz is a surname. Notable people with the name will include:

- Carl E. Stotz (1910–1992) American founder of Little League Baseball
- Karl Stotz (1927–2017) Austrian football player from Vienna
- Charles Morse Stotz (1898–1985), architect, architectural historian and preservationist
- Max Stotz (1912–1943) German Luftwaffe flying ace
- The Carl E. Stotz Memorial Little League Bridge, formerly known as the Market Street Bridge, carries approximately 27,700 vehicles a day on U.S. Route 15
- Edward Stotz, Sr (1868–1948), American architect based in the city of Pittsburgh
- Eva Stotz (born 1979), German documentary film maker and director
- Andrew Stotz, CFA is the current president of the CFA Society Thailand and is one of Thailand’s award-winning equity analysts.
- Kent Stotz (born 1958), American motorcycle racer.
