= Radecic =

Radecic is a surname.

Notable people with the surname include:

- Keith Radecic (born 1963), American football player
- Scott Radecic (born 1962), American football player

== See also ==
- Nico Radicic, American football player
