= George Radosevich =

American football player (1928–2016)

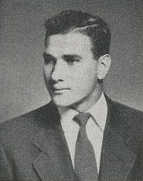
- Radosevich c. 1951 at the University of Pittsburgh

No. 52, 72
- Position: Center

Personal information
- Born: January 25, 1928; Brentwood, Pennsylvania
- Died: April 4, 2016 (aged 88); Anderson, South Carolina
- Listed height: 6 ft 2 in (1.88 m)
- Listed weight: 228 lb (103 kg)

Career information
- High school: Brentwood (PA)
- College: Pittsburgh

Career history
- Baltimore Colts (1954–1956)
- Stats at Pro Football Reference

George L. Radosevich (January 25, 1928 – April 4, 2016) was an American football Center who played for the Baltimore Colts. He played college football at the University of Pittsburgh, having previously attended Brentwood High School in Brentwood, Pennsylvania. He died of heart failure on April 4, 2016.
