= Keith Radecic =

American football player (born 1963)

No. 51
- Position: Center

Personal information
- Born: December 24, 1963 (age 62); Pittsburgh, Pennsylvania, U.S.
- Listed height: 6 ft 1 in (1.85 m)
- Listed weight: 260 lb (118 kg)

Career information
- High school: Brentwood (Brentwood, Pennsylvania)
- College: Penn State
- NFL draft: 1987: undrafted

Career history
- Washington Redskins (1987)*; St. Louis Cardinals (1987)
- * Offseason or practice squad member only

Awards and highlights
- Super Bowl champion (XXII); National champion (1986); First-team All-East (1986)

Career NFL statistics
- Games played: 3
- Games started: 3
- Stats at Pro Football Reference

J. Keith Radecic (born December 24, 1963) is an American former professional football player who was a center for the St. Louis Cardinals of the National Football League (NFL) in 1987. He played college football for the Penn State Nittany Lions. His brother Scott also played at Penn State and in the NFL for the Kansas City Chiefs, Buffalo Bills and Indianapolis Colts from 1984 to 1995.
