= Phillips Park =

Phillips Park may refer to:

- Phillips Park (Aurora, Illinois)
- Phillips Park (Pittsburgh)
