= Whitehall, Allegheny County, Pennsylvania =

Borough in Pennsylvania, US

Whitehall, Pennsylvania
- Borough
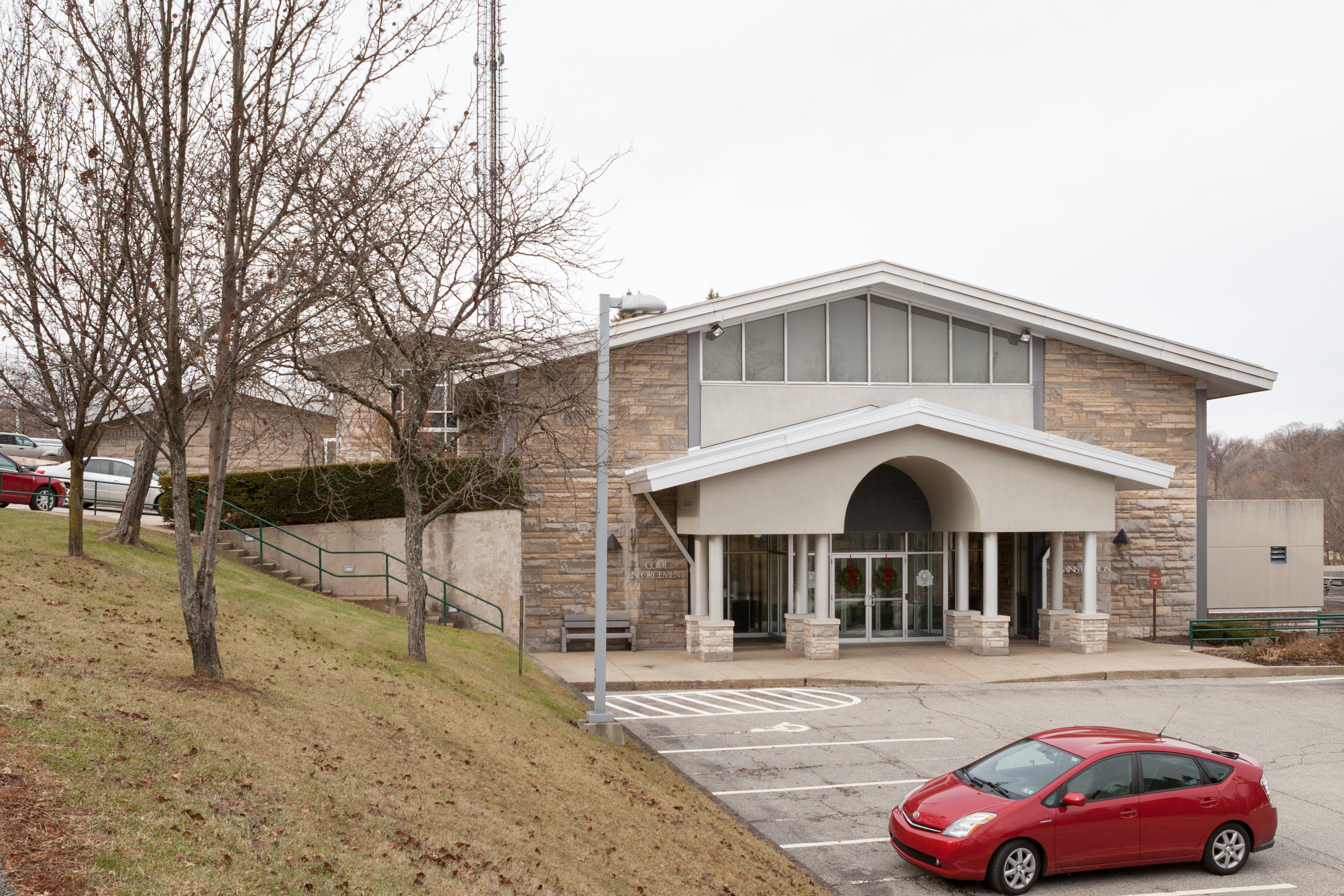
- Borough of Whitehall municipal building

- Logo (with coat of arms)

- Location in Allegheny County and the state of Pennsylvania

- Location within Pennsylvania
- Coordinates: 40°21′37″N 79°59′11″W
- Country: United States
- State: Pennsylvania
- County: Allegheny
- Incorporated: 1948

Government
  - Mayor: James Nowalk

Area
  - Total: 3.32 sq mi (8.61 km^{2})
  - Land: 3.32 sq mi (8.61 km^{2})
  - Water: 0 sq mi (0.00 km^{2})

Population (2020)
  - Total: 15,064
  - Density: 4,529.9/sq mi (1,748.99/km^{2})
- Time zone: Eastern (EST)
  - Summer (DST): EDT
- Zip code: 15236
- Area code: 412
- FIPS code: 42-84512
- GNIS feature ID: 1214840
- Website: whitehallboro.gov

Whitehall is a borough with home rule status in Allegheny County, Pennsylvania, United States. The population was 15,064 at the 2020 census, an increase of 1,120 since the 2010 census. It is part of the Pittsburgh metropolitan area.

== History ==
Whitehall is probably named after Silas D. Prior's tavern on Brownsville Road, which was renamed White Hall in the 1850s. The building is still in existence, but is in Brentwood. Another possible source of the borough's name is that the area, which used to be located within the township of Baldwin, was known as Whitehall Driving Park.

In 1946, residents of Baldwin Township's fourth, fifth, sixth, and seventh wards began the process of secession. A petition was filed on October 14, 1946, in the Quarterly Sessions of Allegheny County, with 1320 signatures out of the 1627 freeholders in the proposed borough. In response to this, Baldwin Township officials called an emergency meeting to file a petition to have Baldwin Township incorporated into a borough, as it is much more difficult to secede from a borough than from a township. On January 5, 1948, Whitehall separated from Baldwin Township to become an independent municipality. According to former mayor Edwin F. Brennan, residents of Whitehall wanted better services and zoning than they received under the jurisdiction of the township.

== Geography ==
According to the United States Census Bureau, the borough has a total area of 3.3 square miles (8.5 km^{2}), all land.

=== Surrounding communities ===
Whitehall has five borders, including the Pittsburgh neighborhood of Overbrook to the north, Brentwood to the northeast, Baldwin to the south and east, Bethel Park to the southwest, and Castle Shannon to the northwest.

== Demographics ==
Historical population
Census	Pop.	Note	%±
1950	7,342		—
1960	16,075		118.9%
1970	16,450		2.3%
1980	15,143		−7.9%
1990	14,451		−4.6%
2000	14,444		0.0%
2010	13,944		−3.5%
2020	15,064		8.0%
U.S. Decennial Census

As of the 2000 census, there were 14,444 people, 6,294 households, and 3,958 families residing in the borough. The population density was 4,397.8 inhabitants per square mile (1,698.0/km^{2}). There were 6,519 housing units at an average density of 1,984.9 per square mile (766.4/km^{2}). The racial makeup of the borough was 96.60% White, 1.42% African American, 0.02% Native American, 0.93% Asian, 0.01% Pacific Islander, 0.28% from other races, and 0.74% from two or more races. Hispanic or Latino of any race were 0.66% of the population.

There were 6,294 households, out of which 24.0% had children under the age of 18 living with them, 53.1% were married couples living together, 7.8% had a female householder with no husband present, and 37.1% were non-families. 33.4% of all households were made up of individuals, and 15.4% had someone living alone who was 65 years of age or older. The average household size was 2.23 and the average family size was 2.87.

In the borough the population was spread out, with 19.4% under the age of 18, 6.5% from 18 to 24, 26.1% from 25 to 44, 23.8% from 45 to 64, and 24.2% who were 65 years of age or older. The median age was 44 years. For every 100 females there were 86.7 males. For every 100 females age 18 and over, there were 82.7 males.

The median income for a household in the borough was $45,111, and the median income for a family was $60,371. Males had a median income of $42,658 versus $31,167 for females. The per capita income for the borough was $24,730. 6.4% of the population and 2.9% of families were below the poverty line. Out of the total people living in poverty, 5.7% are under the age of 18 and 7.2% are 65 or older.

== Recreation and amenities ==
A large swimming pool, wading pool, four tennis courts and community room are provided at the municipal complex, as well as the Whitehall public library, which has a Hennen American Public Library 90th percentile Rating (HAPLR), making it one of the top 25 in the state. Six ballfields and playgrounds are distributed throughout the borough. The private South Hills Country Club provides golf, swimming, dining and social activities.

Caste Village, a large shopping center including a strip mall, outbuildings and offices, is the hub of retail activity in this largely residential community. Additional stand-alone storefronts line Pennsylvania Route 51.

Whitehall is named one of the two "Most Livable Communities" in Metropolitan Pittsburgh by PHH Technologies Services, a company that advises corporations on employee relocations.

== Government ==
Whitehall has been a home rule community since January 1, 1975. The borough is governed by a mayor and seven council members, all elected at-large. Services are provided by a full-time administrator, twenty full-time police officers, a ten-person public works department and a handful of other staff members.

The Whitehall Volunteer Fire Company and Medical Rescue Team South Authority provide fire and ambulance service to the borough.

== Education ==
Baldwin-Whitehall School District serves the borough, as well as the Baldwin Borough and Baldwin Township. Students in grades 9–12 from all three municipalities attend Baldwin High School.

One of the district's three elementary schools, Whitehall Elementary, along with J.E. Harrison Middle School and Baldwin High School, are located within the borough.

Also located within the borough are the following schools:

- ACLD Tillotson School (Association for Children and Adults with Learning Disabilities) (K-12)
- Wesley Spectrum High School (9-12)
- St. Gabriel of the Sorrowful Virgin School (K-8)

== Transportation ==
Pennsylvania Route 51, a major area artery, delivers traffic from and through Whitehall to downtown Pittsburgh. The borough is also served by four county bus lines.

Preceded by Castle Shannon	Bordering communities of Pittsburgh	Succeeded by Brentwood
