= Rosella Kanarik =

American math professor (1909–2014)

- Born: Rosella Kanarik; February 7, 1909; Bartfa, Hungary
- Died: April 19, 2014 (aged 105); Los Angeles, California
- Education: University of Pittsburgh
- Occupation: Mathematics educator
- Spouse: Emery Kanarik

Rosella Kanarik (1909–2014) was an American mathematics educator and was one of the first women to receive a Ph.D. in math from the University of Pittsburgh. She was one of the few women to earn a doctorate in math before World War II.

== Biography ==
Rosella Kanarik was born February 7, 1909 in Bartfa, then part of Hungary, as the oldest of two children. Her parents were Sarah Schondorf and Albert Kanarik, both of Bartfa. Her father immigrated to the United States ahead of his family and then he returned to Hungary to marry Sarah in November 1907. In July 1912, her father returned to the U.S., followed by Rosella and her mother in September 1913. Her younger brother Edgar was born in Pittsburgh in 1926.

She attended public high schools, first at Wadleigh High School in New York City followed by Fifth Avenue High School in Pittsburgh, where she graduated with highest honors in 1926. She went on to earn three degrees from the University of Pittsburgh (BA 1930, MA 1931, PhD 1934). Her doctoral dissertation on Fundamental regions in S4 for the Hessian group was supervised by Montgomery Culver.

Jobs were scarce when she graduated during The Great Depression so Rosella took a teaching position at a Pittsburgh high school (1932–1936). In 1936, she got married and by 1937, the couple were living in California where their first child was born.

Rosella Kanarik taught in high schools in Los Angeles from 1939 to 1946 when she was hired as a lecturer at the University of Southern California where there was a great need for math instructors because of World War II. She held that position until 1952 and taught many levels of math courses while she worked there. In 1953, she became the first female to be named a member of the math department at Los Angeles City College and spent the remainder of her career there. She retired only when she reached the mandated age of 65.

While she lived, the mathematics department of the Los Angeles City College awarded an annual merit-based grant called the Rosella Kanarik scholarship, which was funded through a "generous donation" by Kanarik.

In her retirement, Kanarik volunteered as a tutor for numerous high school and college students without cost to them.

Her organizational affiliations included AMS, MAA, NCTM and the Sigma Xi honor society. She was also a member of the UCLA Affiliates, the Los Angeles Women's Architectural League, the Brandeis University National Women's Committee and Pioneer Women.

== Personal life ==
On July 25, 1936, Rosella married her cousin Emery Kanarik, who was born in 1909 in Bardejov Spa, Czechoslovakia and attended the College of the City of New York, (now part of City University of New York) 1926–1928. They had two children, both born in Los Angeles, Richard (born 1937), and Susan Carol (born 1940). Emery Kanarik died in 1992.

Rosella died at home in Los Angeles on April 19, 2014 at the age of 105.
