= Carrick (Pittsburgh) =

- Neighborhood of Pittsburgh; Former Borough
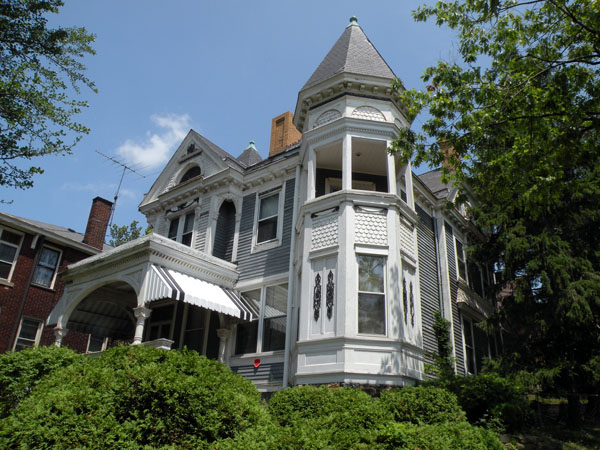
- Wigman House, built in 1888, on Brownsville Road in Carrick

- Coordinates: 40.397°N 79.987°W
- Country: United States
- State: Pennsylvania
- County: Allegheny County
- City: Pittsburgh
- Incorporated: 1904

Area
  - Total: 1.673 sq mi (4.33 km^{2})

Population (2010)
  - Total: 10,113
  - Density: 6,045/sq mi (2,334/km^{2})
- ZIP Code: 15227, 15210

Carrick is a south neighborhood of Pittsburgh, Pennsylvania in the United States. It is served by two zip codes, 15210 and 15227, and has representation on Pittsburgh City Council by the council member for District 4 (South Neighborhoods).

Located between the suburbs of the South Hills and downtown, Carrick is well-served by public transportation. The neighborhood has, since the early 2000s, become the epicenter of Pittsburgh's burgeoning Nepali and Bhutanese communities.

== Geography ==
Carrick is located on the southeastern edge of the City of Pittsburgh. It is situated atop a crest west of the Monongahela River. Brownsville Road runs across the top of the crest and is the main thoroughfare through the neighborhood. The Carrick section of Brownsville Road is approximately 2.2 miles (3.5 km) long; it generally comprises three discrete business districts with residential areas in between.

== Surrounding neighborhoods ==
Carrick has nine borders, including the Pittsburgh neighborhoods of Knoxville and Mt. Oliver to the north, St. Clair to the northeast, Overbrook to the southwest, Brookline to the west, and Bon Air to the northwest. The remaining borders are with the boroughs of Mt. Oliver to the north (between Knoxville and its Pittsburgh neighborhood namesake), Baldwin to the east, and Brentwood to the south and southeast.

== History ==
Carrick was originally part of the land grant to Major John Ormsby from King George III in 1763 for his service during the French and Indian War. Carrick and Mt. Oliver were once known as the Ormsby Tract or simply Ormsby. The city of Birmingham was organized on this land by Ormsby's son in law Nathanial Bedford. It became known for coal mines and a glassworks in the Crailo area, also known as Spiketown, near the Presbyterian Church and Volunteers Field.

In 1853, Dr. John H. O'Brien received permission from the United States Postal Service to establish a post office in the area; for his hard work he was given the honor of naming it, and he chose "Carrick" after his home town, Carrick-on-Suir, Ireland. Carrick became a Borough in 1904 and in 1926 voted to become part of the City of Pittsburgh. In 1927 it officially became known as the 29th Ward.

== Public facilities ==
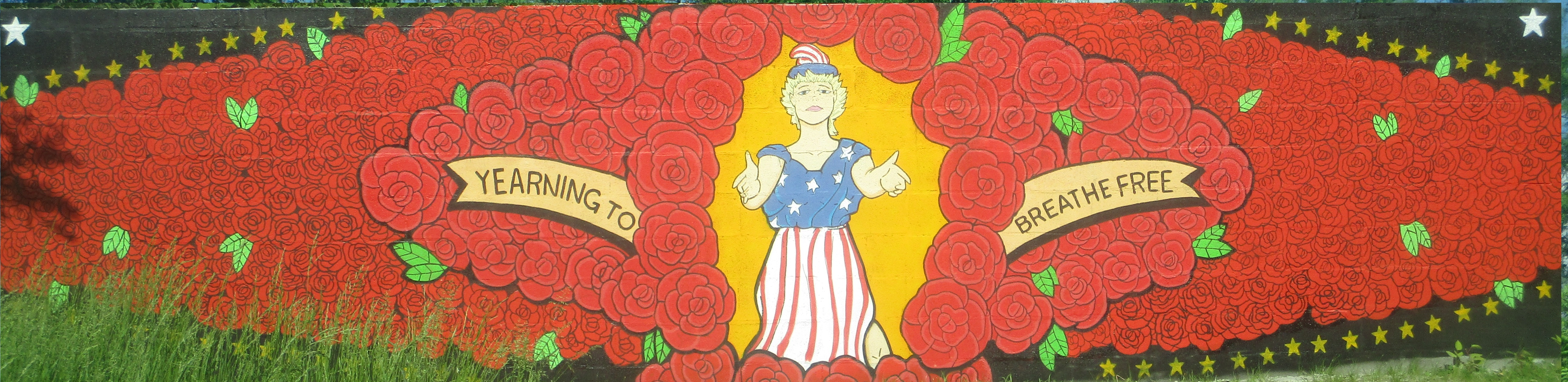
Columbia of Carrick, mural by Brian Gonnella, located in Carrick

The neighborhood boasts of numerous parklet playgrounds, the Carnegie Library of Carrick, historic Phillips Park (comprising walking paths, a disc golf course, a recreation center and swimming pool) and Volunteers Field (comprising a baseball-only field and a multipurpose athletic field). Carrick is also the home to Emma Lazarus Sensory Garden, where the Columbia of Carrick mural by Brian Gonnella is located.

In 1997, Carrick was named the first "Cool Community" in the northern United States by the U.S. Department of Energy. "Cool Community" is a national recognition program for strategic treeplanting for energy conservation purposes. Partnering with conservation organizations, community groups worked to weatherize homes and businesses, plant trees and flowers, and add elements of "green building" to the renovation of Carrick High School.

The Pittsburgh Bureau of Fire houses Engine 23 in Carrick. Engine 23 is a 2000 gal (7570 L) Spartan Metro-Star engine. It also houses Command Unit 200, which is a combination 2007 Pierce / LDV command unit.

== Education ==
- Carrick High School
- Concord Elementary School
- Roosevelt Elementary School

== Places of worship ==
Carrick includes Hindu, Roman Catholic, Protestant, Evangelical, Jehovah's Witness, Lutheran, and Byzantine Catholic places of worship.

== See also ==
- List of Pittsburgh neighborhoods
- Carrick Borough Building
- Wigman House
