= Charles Morse Stotz =

American architect, historian, and preservationist

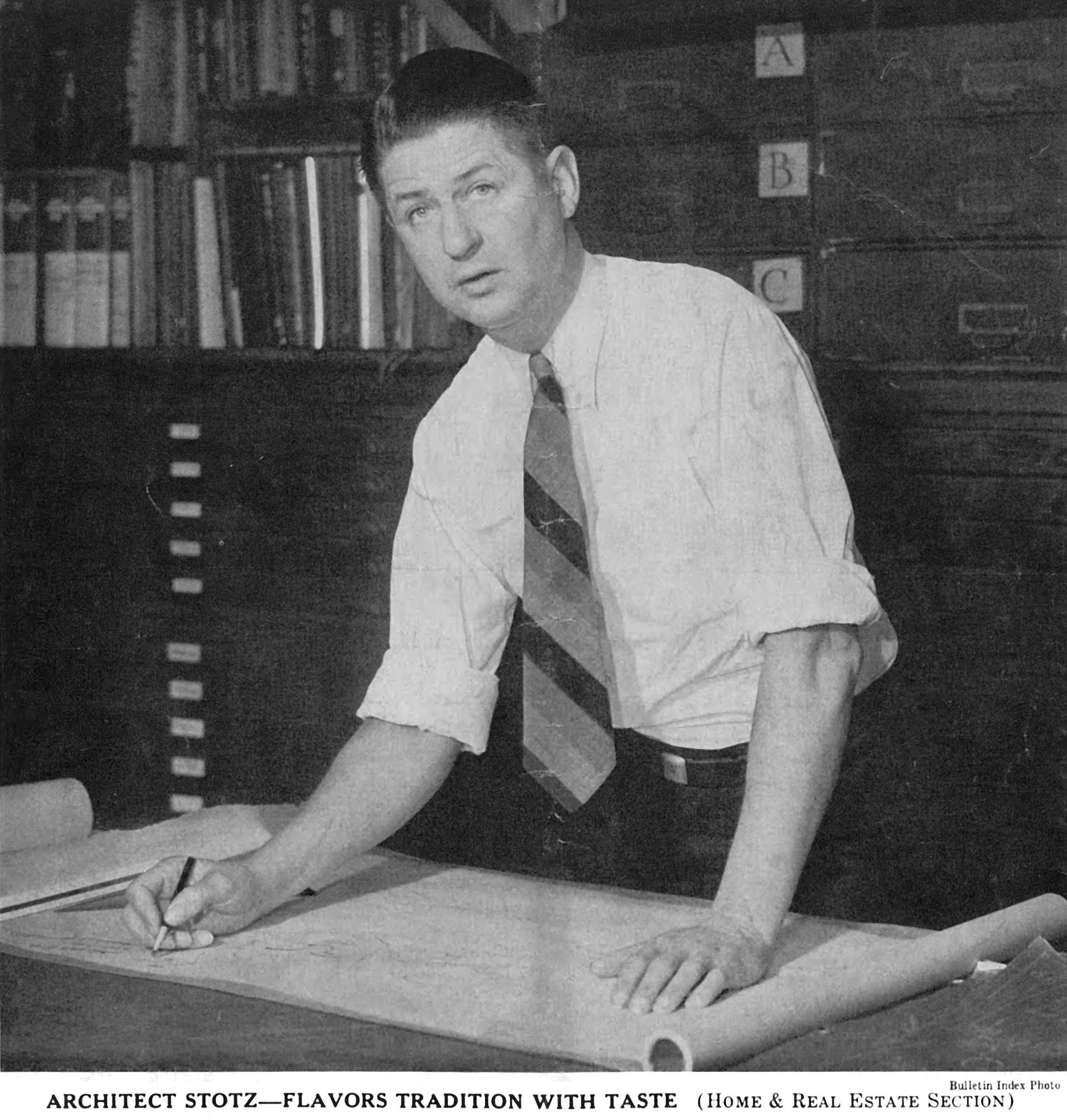
- Born: August 1, 1898; Ingram, Pennsylvania, U.S.
- Died: March 5, 1985 (age 86); Fort Myers, Florida, U.S.
- Education: Cornell University
- Occupations: Architect, architectural historian, preservationist
- Known for: Historic preservation in Western Pennsylvania
- Spouse: Mildred Shaw
- Children: 3

Charles Morse Stotz was an American architect, architectural historian, and preservationist. He is known for his extensive study of the architectural history of Pittsburgh and Western Pennsylvania. He was one of the architects to practice in the field of preservation. He was credited with arousing "public awareness of the rich and significant history of Western Pennsylvania."

== Early life and career ==
Stotz was born in 1898 in Ingram, Pennsylvania. His father, Edward Stotz, was a noted architect in Pittsburgh. As a 15-year-old, he won 5th place in the Boys' Life national Daniel Boone Contest essay contest, winning $1.00. He was the grandfather of Andrew Stotz.

He graduated from Cornell University with a degree in architecture in 1921 and later completed his master's degree there.

Stotz joined his father's architectural firm in 1923. By 1936, his father left the firm to his sons, Charles and Edward Stotz Jr.; the new firm was called Charles M. and Edward Stotz Jr., Architect and Engineer. He was active in the Pittsburgh chapter of the American Institute of Architects, serving as secretary from 1935 to 1936 and president from 1940 to 1941.

As an architectural critic, he felt that post-Civil War American architecture lacked form, or as he said, had "gone to pot", as the result of the influence of the industrial age.

== The Early Architecture of Western Pennsylvania ==
In 1931, Historical Monuments Committee of the Pittsburgh Chapter of the American Institute of Architects reported on the disrepair of many unrecorded historic buildings in western Pennsylvania. Answering that call, Stotz and fellow architects created Western Pennsylvania Architectural Survey, funded partially by the Buhl Foundation. The effort was similar to the federally funded Historic American Buildings Survey that would be created a few years later. Stotz served as chairman of the group that traveled 6,000 miles to survey an area covering 22,000 square miles over 27 Pennsylvania counties. The finished product, The Early Architecture of Western Pennsylvania, included photographs, architectural illustrations, precise measurements, and historical context for 542 buildings. A new edition of the book was published in 1966.

He was chairman of the Western Pennsylvania Architectural Survey from 1932 to 1935 and the Western Pennsylvania section of the Historic American Buildings Survey from 1934 to 1937.

== Forts ==
Early in his career, he was instrumental in the restoration of Old Economy Village in Ambridge, Pennsylvania. He guided the restoration of Fort Ligonier in Ligonier, Pennsylvania. His research on that project led him to be the definitive expert on 18th century forts in North America. In the late 1940s, he planned a restoration of Fort Pitt, but it was cost-prohibitive. He turned to the development of the Fort Pitt Museum at Point State Park. His exhaustive research into the design of 18th century forts took him to review architectural documents in London and Paris and to visit every fort from Nova Scotia to Florida.

He and Alfred James Proctor co-authored the 1958 history of the French and Indian War in Western Pennsylvania, Drums in the Forest, which was the Historical Society of Western Pennsylvania's contribution to the celebration of Pittsburgh’s Bicentennial in 1958-59.

In 1963, he left the firm he owned with his brother to start Stotz, McLaughlin, and Hess. He served as a consultant for the restoration of numerous Western Pennsylvania landmarks, including Compass Inn, Drake Well, Hanna's Town, Johnston Tavern, Neill Log House, Stone House, Washington's Mill, and Wilson's Birthplace.

After 1969, he began working on the book Outposts of the War for Empire, published by the Historical Society of Western Pennsylvania in 1985. More than a mere history, it contained detailed architectural drawings of 18th century frontier forts.

== Death and legacy ==
He retired in 1974. He died on March 5, 1985, at his home in Fort Myers, Florida.

His work inspired many preservationists; his architectural drawings provided templates for other historically accurate restorations.

Collections of Stotz's papers and photographs are housed at the Heinz History Center's Detre Library & Archives. The Charles M. Stotz Photographs collection includes 4,500 photographs, most taken by Stotz, from The Early Architecture of Western Pennsylvania, as well as restoration projects throughout Western Pennsylvania. The Charles M. Stotz Papers includes research, writings, and drawings primarily of Stotz's historic preservation work.

== Publications ==
- Stotz, Charles Morse (1936). The Early Architecture of Western Pennsylvania. Pittsburgh: The Buhl Foundation.
- Stotz, Charles Morse; James, Alfred Procter (1958). Drums in the Forest: Decision at the Forks. Pittsburgh: Historical Society of Western Pennsylvania.
- Stotz, Charles Morse (1958). The Story of Fort Ligonier. Fort Ligonier Memorial Foundation.
- Stotz, Charles Morse (1970). The Model of Fort Pitt: A Description and Brief Account of Britain's Greatest American Stronghold. Pennsylvania Historical and Museum Commission.
- Stotz, Charles Morse (1970). Point of Empire: Conflict at the Forks of the Ohio. Pittsburgh: Historical Society of Western Pennsylvania.
- Stotz, Charles Morse (1985). Outposts Of The War For Empire: The French And English In Western Pennsylvania. Pittsburgh: Historical Society of Western Pennsylvania.
