= Fifth Avenue High School =

- U.S. National Register of Historic Places
- City of Pittsburgh Historic Structure
- Pittsburgh Landmark – PHLF
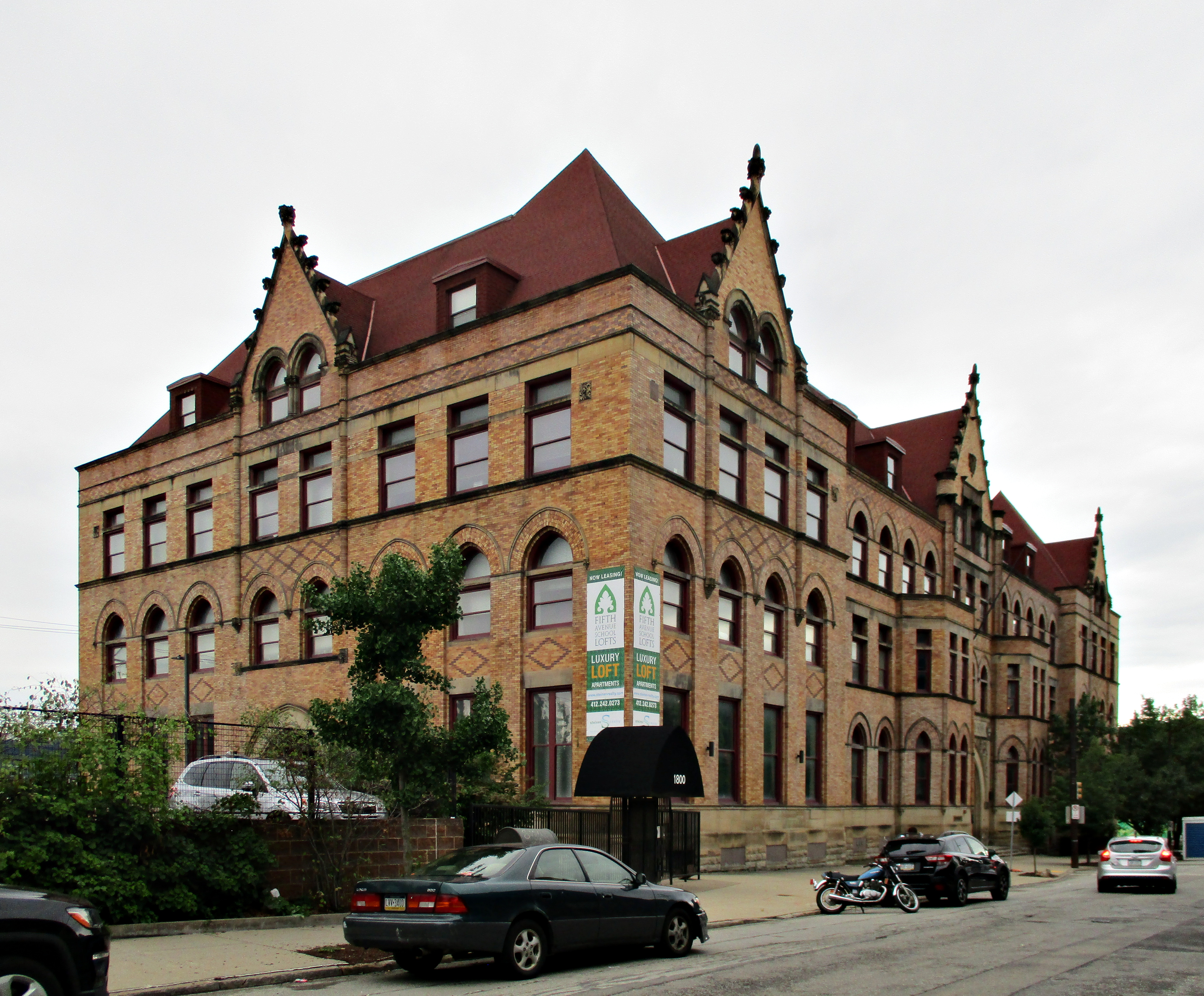
- Fifth Avenue High School

- Location within Pittsburgh Location within Pennsylvania Location within the United States
- Location: 1800 Fifth Ave., Pittsburgh, Pennsylvania
- Coordinates: 40°26′17″N 79°58′51″W
- Area: 1 acre (0.40 ha)
- Built: 1894
- Architect: Edward Stotz
- Architectural style: Gothic
- MPS: Pittsburgh Public Schools TR
- NRHP reference No.: 86002956

Significant dates
- Added to NRHP: October 23, 1986
- Designated CPHS: November 30, 1999
- Designated PHLF: 1998

Fifth Avenue High School is a defunct school located at 1800 Fifth Avenue in the Bluff neighborhood of Pittsburgh, Pennsylvania, United States.

Built in 1894 as a large Romanesque/Gothic Revival building, it served the Pittsburgh Public Schools until its closure in 1976. For over thirty years, the building sat empty, boarded up, and fenced off until it was eventually converted into other uses.

Fifth Avenue was the first fireproof school in Pennsylvania and was home to the Alpha chapter of the National Honor Society. Its colors were red and white, and the mascot was the Archer, so chosen because of the school's architecture and hallways filled with Gothic and Victorian arches lined with red and white tile.

Fifth Avenue was a dominant force in city sports, winning the state title in its last year open for basketball. The school served the Lower Hill District, while its main rival, Schenley High School, served the upper and middle Hill.

The building was listed in the National Register of Historic Places in 1986 and was listed as a Pittsburgh History & Landmarks Foundation landmark in 1998 and a City of Pittsburgh landmark in 1999.

Beginning in 2009, it was converted into loft apartments by a Pittsburgh-based investor group. Construction on the project was completed in 2012. Numerous components of the structure, such as plaster ceilings in common areas, were saved, preserved, or reused in the renovations.

Among the school's notable alumni are former Mayor of Pittsburgh Sophie Masloff, Dapper Dan Charities founder and former Pittsburgh Post-Gazette sports editor Al Abrams, and forensic pathologist Cyril Wecht, who served as Coroner (later Medical Examiner) and a Commissioner of Allegheny County.

== Notable alumni ==
- Virginia Proctor Powell Florence (1897–1991), American librarian
- Jack Sack (1902–1980), American football player and coach
- Rosella Kanarik (1909–2014), American mathematics professor and educator
