= Brentwood Borough School District =

School district in Pennsylvania

- Map of Allegheny County school districts

Address
- 3601 Brownsville Road Pittsburgh, Pennsylvania, 15227; United States

District information
- Type: Public

Students and staff
- District mascot: Spartans

Other information
- Website: https://www.bb-sd.com/

The Brentwood Borough School District is a small, suburban public school district. It serves the Borough of Brentwood in Allegheny County, Pennsylvania. The School District of the Borough of Brentwood encompasses approximately 1.5 square miles. According to 2000 federal census data, it serves a resident population of 10,466. In 2009, the district residents' per capita income was $2,024, while the median family income was $38,552.

The district operates four schools:

- Brentwood High School,
- Brentwood Middle School
- Elroy Avenue Elementary School (K-5th)
- Moore Elementary School (K-5th)

== Extracurriculars ==
The district offers a wide variety of clubs.

=== Sports ===
The district offers high school students: Track and Field, Golf, Football, Girls' Volleyball, Girls' Basketball, Girls' Softball, Baseball, Cross Country, Soccer, and Swimming.

Middle school - Swimming, Cheerleading, Basketball, as well as Track and Field.

It also offers a combined Middle and High school marching band
