= Helen MacCloskey =

American aviator (1909-1977)

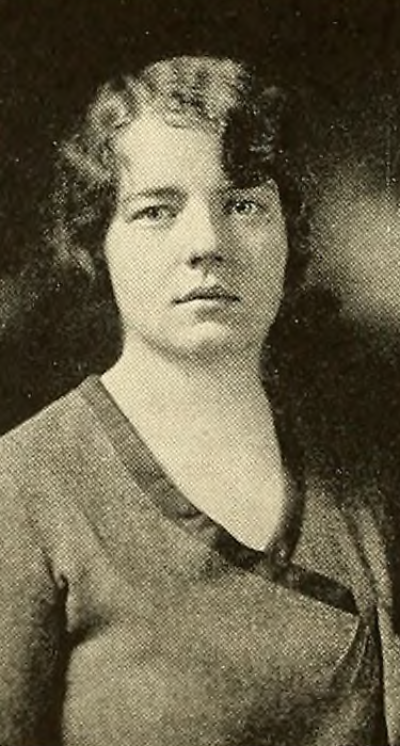
- MacCloskey, from the 1929 yearbook of Wellesley College
- Born: October 20, 1909; Pittsburgh, Pennsylvania, U.S.
- Died: February 17, 1977 (aged 67); Washington, D.C., U.S.
- Other name: Helen Rough
- Relatives: Manus MacCloskey (uncle); Monro MacCloskey (cousin)

Helen MacCloskey Rough (October 20, 1909 – 1977) was an American aviator, one of Pittsburgh's "Three Flying Helens", along with fellow pilots Helen Stiner Ball and Helen Richey.

== Early life and education ==
MacCloskey was born in Pittsburgh, Pennsylvania, the daughter of James Edward MacCloskey Jr. and Helen Irwin MacCloskey. Her uncle Manus MacCloskey was a United States Army general. She attended Schenley High School, graduated from Wellesley College in 1929, and pursued further studies at Columbia University, while taking flying lessons on Staten Island.

== Career ==
MacCloskey earned a pilot's license in 1930, and a transport license in 1931; her 1931 license was signed by Orville Wright. Based in Pittsburgh, she was a flight instructor, did exhibition flying, and competed in air derbies with her own plane, including the Cord Cup race in 1932. She set air speed, altitude, and distance records in the mid-1930s.

From 1934 to 1937 MacCloskey worked with Nancy Harkness, Louise Thaden, Blanche Noyes, and Phoebe Omlie at the Bureau of Air Commerce's National Air Marking Program, identifying buildings to mark as navigation aids. During World War II she was an organizer of the Civil Air Patrol, and worked with the Women’s Auxiliary Ferrying Squadron (WAFS). She also drive an ambulance for the American Red Cross.

MacCloskey was a member of the Ninety-Nines and the Sportsman Pilots Association. She named a Pioneer of Aviation in 1970, by the National Aviation Club. OX5 Aviation Pioneers presented her with the Outstanding Women's Award in 1975.

== Personal life ==
MacCloskey married fellow aviator Howard Fanning Rough in 1937. They had a son. Her husband died in 1969, and she died in 1977, at the age of 67, in Washington, D.C. Her family papers are in the Heinz History Center in Pittsburgh.
