= Pearl Berg =

American supercentenarian (1909–2024)

- Born: Pearl Louise Synenberg; October 1, 1909; Evansville, Indiana, U.S.
- Died: February 1, 2024 (aged 114 years, 123 days); Los Feliz, California, U.S.
- Resting place: Hollywood Forever Cemetery
- Education: Schenley High School
- Known for: Supercentenarian
- Spouse: Mark Berg (m. 1931; died 1989)
- Children: 2

Pearl Louise Berg (née Synenberg; October 1, 1909 – February 1, 2024) was an American supercentenarian who was the oldest Jewish person alive and also the 9th oldest living person in the world at the time of her death. She resided in Los Angeles, California, and died on February 1, 2024, at age 114.

== Biography ==
Pearl Louise Synenberg was born in Evansville, Indiana, on October 1, 1909 (although she celebrated her birthday as February 14, 1910), to Archie Synenberg and Annie Gerson, children of Jewish immigrants from Eastern Europe. She had a sister, Selma, and a brother, Bob. They moved to various states throughout their childhood, but she attended Schenley High School in Pittsburgh. The family moved to California in 1929, a few months before the stock market crash.

In 1931, she married Mark Berg, a Jewish immigrant from Kremenchuk, Ukraine. He died when she was 79. They had two sons, Alan and Robert. Pearl Berg resided in Los Angeles, where she died on February 1, 2024, at the age of 114 years, 123 days. She was buried at Hollywood Forever Cemetery.
