= Scott Radecic =

American football player (born 1962)

No. 97, 95, 52
- Position: Linebacker

Personal information
- Born: June 14, 1962 (age 64); Pittsburgh, Pennsylvania, U.S.
- Listed height: 6 ft 3 in (1.91 m)
- Listed weight: 243 lb (110 kg)

Career information
- High school: Brentwood (Pittsburgh)
- College: Penn State
- NFL draft: 1984: 2nd round, 34th overall pick

Career history
- Kansas City Chiefs (1984–1986); Buffalo Bills (1987–1989); Indianapolis Colts (1990–1995); Oakland Raiders (1996)*
- * Offseason or practice squad member only

Awards and highlights
- National champion (1982); First-team All-American (1982); Second-team All-American (1983); 2× Second-team All-East (1982, 1983)

Career NFL statistics
- Tackles: 674
- Sacks: 7
- Interceptions: 8
- Fumble recoveries: 7
- Stats at Pro Football Reference

Jude Scott Radecic (born June 14, 1962) is an American former professional football player who was a linebacker for twelve seasons in the National Football League (NFL).

Radecic was born in Pittsburgh, Pennsylvania and played scholastically at suburban Brentwood High School, graduating in 1980. He played college football at Penn State University.

As a junior, Radecic was a member of their consensus national champion team. He was also honored as both a first-team All-American (GNS), and an Academic All-American. His senior year, he was named to the All-American second-team by Football News.

Radecic was selected by the Kansas City Chiefs in the second round of the 1984 NFL draft. He was with the Chiefs for three years (1984–86), then had another three-year stint with the Buffalo Bills (1987–89), and finally spent six years with the Indianapolis Colts (1990–95). He recorded 7 career sacks, 7 fumble recoveries, and 8 interceptions, one of which he returned for a touchdown.

His brother Keith also played at Penn State and in the NFL for the St. Louis Cardinals in 1987.

Scott is currently a Senior Principal at Populous, where he serves as the principal in charge of projects in collegiate sports, the NFL and elite athletic training facilities.
