= Edward Stotz =

American architect

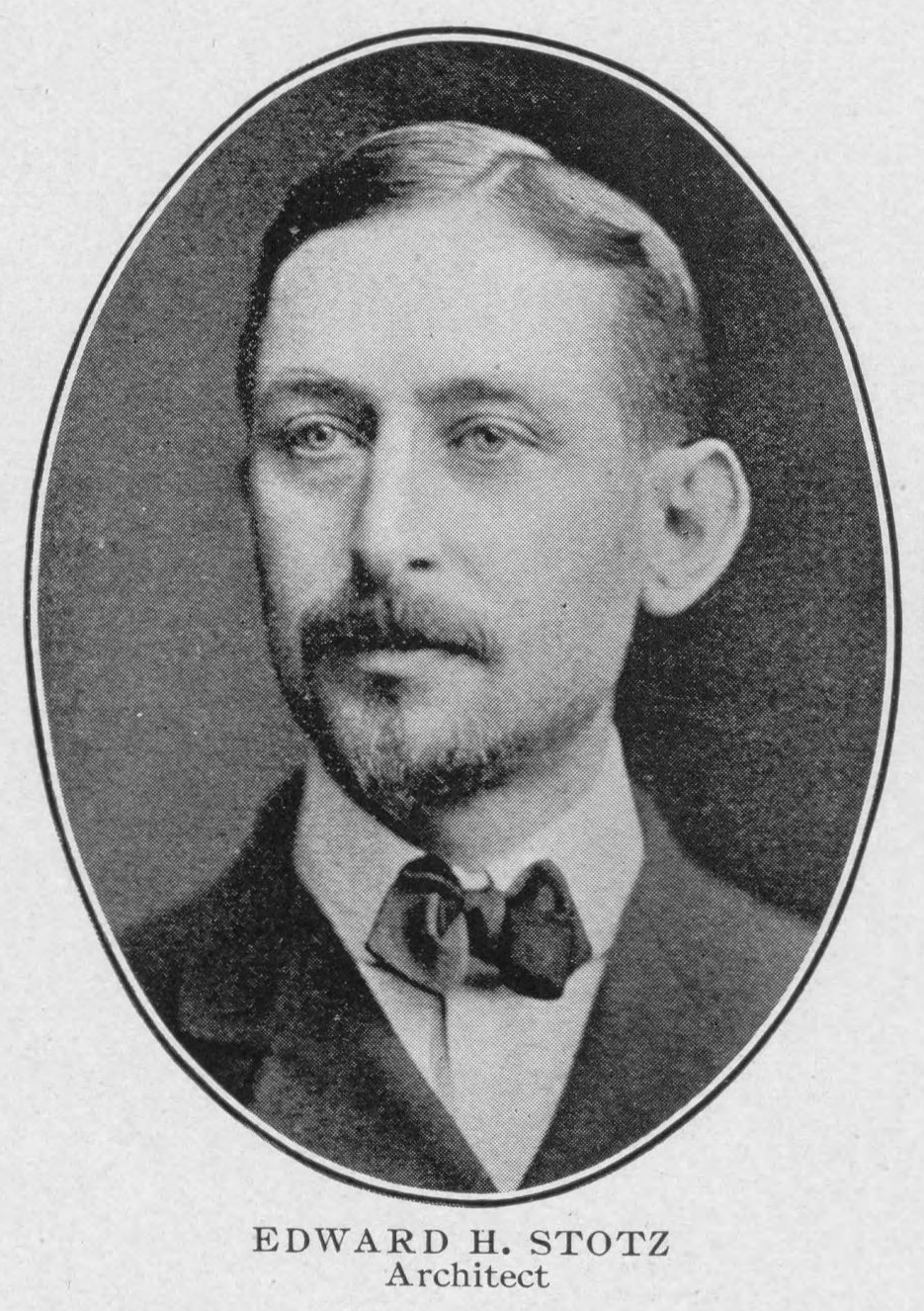
Edward Stotz as depicted in Palmer's Pictorial Pittsburgh, 1905

Edward Stotz Sr. (1868–1948) was an American architect who was based in the city of Pittsburgh in the Commonwealth of Pennsylvania. He designed numerous buildings during the late nineteenth and early twentieth centuries that are now listed as significant by the National Register of Historic Places and the Pittsburgh History and Landmarks Foundation.

== Formative years ==
Born in Allegheny City, Pennsylvania in 1868, now commonly known as the North Side of Pittsburgh, Stotz spent a brief time in Europe before setting up shop in his home region in 1893.

== Career ==
Stotz established the architecture firm that is now MacLachlan, Cornelius, & Filoni, holding the presidency of the Pennsylvania State Association of Architects, a forerunner to the Pennsylvania chapter of the American Institute of Architects, while designing numerous school buildings, churches, and other buildings of interest along the way. He was also the father of architect and photographer Charles M. Stotz, who was also an advocate for preservation of historic structures in and around the city.

Some noted regional examples of Stotz's work include Schenley High School in the Oakland neighborhood, Fifth Avenue High School, St. Kieran Church, and Church of the Epiphany near the Bluff section of the city, and the Oakmont golf course clubhouse in Plum borough.

He was the great-grandfather of Andrew Stotz.

== Buildings ==
Italics denote a Nationally Registered Historic Place:

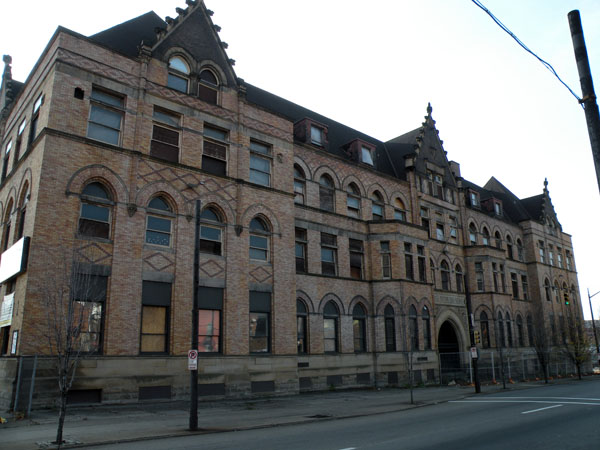
Fifth Avenue High School, 1894, in Pittsburgh's Bluff neighborhood

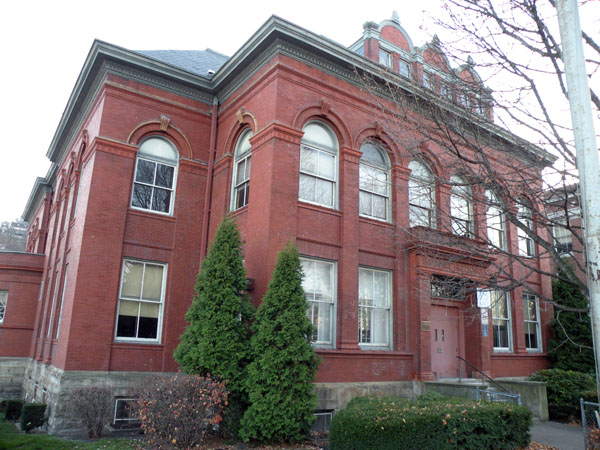
South Vo-Tech High School (South Side High School), 1897, 1923, in Pittsburgh's South Side neighborhood

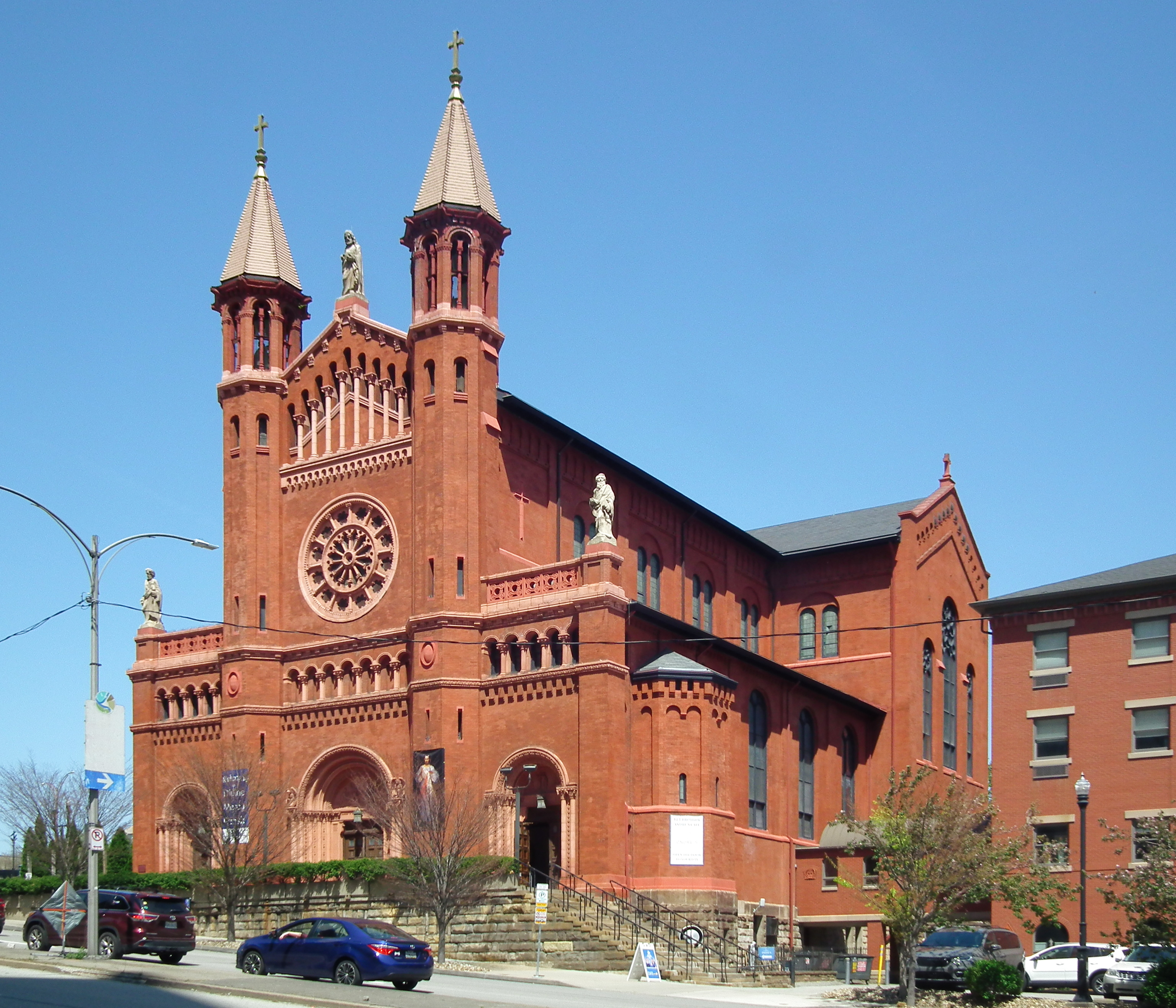
Epiphany Catholic Church, 1902, located in Pittsburgh's Hill District neighborhood

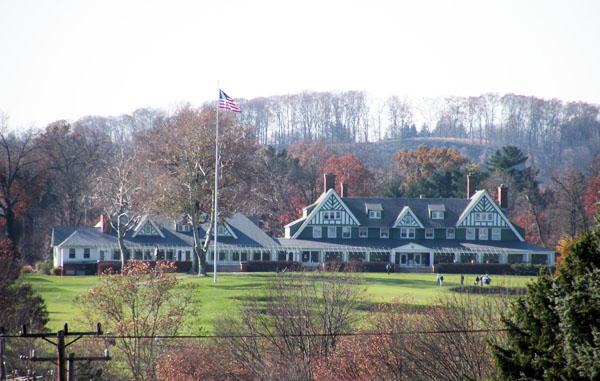
Oakmont Country Club, 1904, in Plum Borough

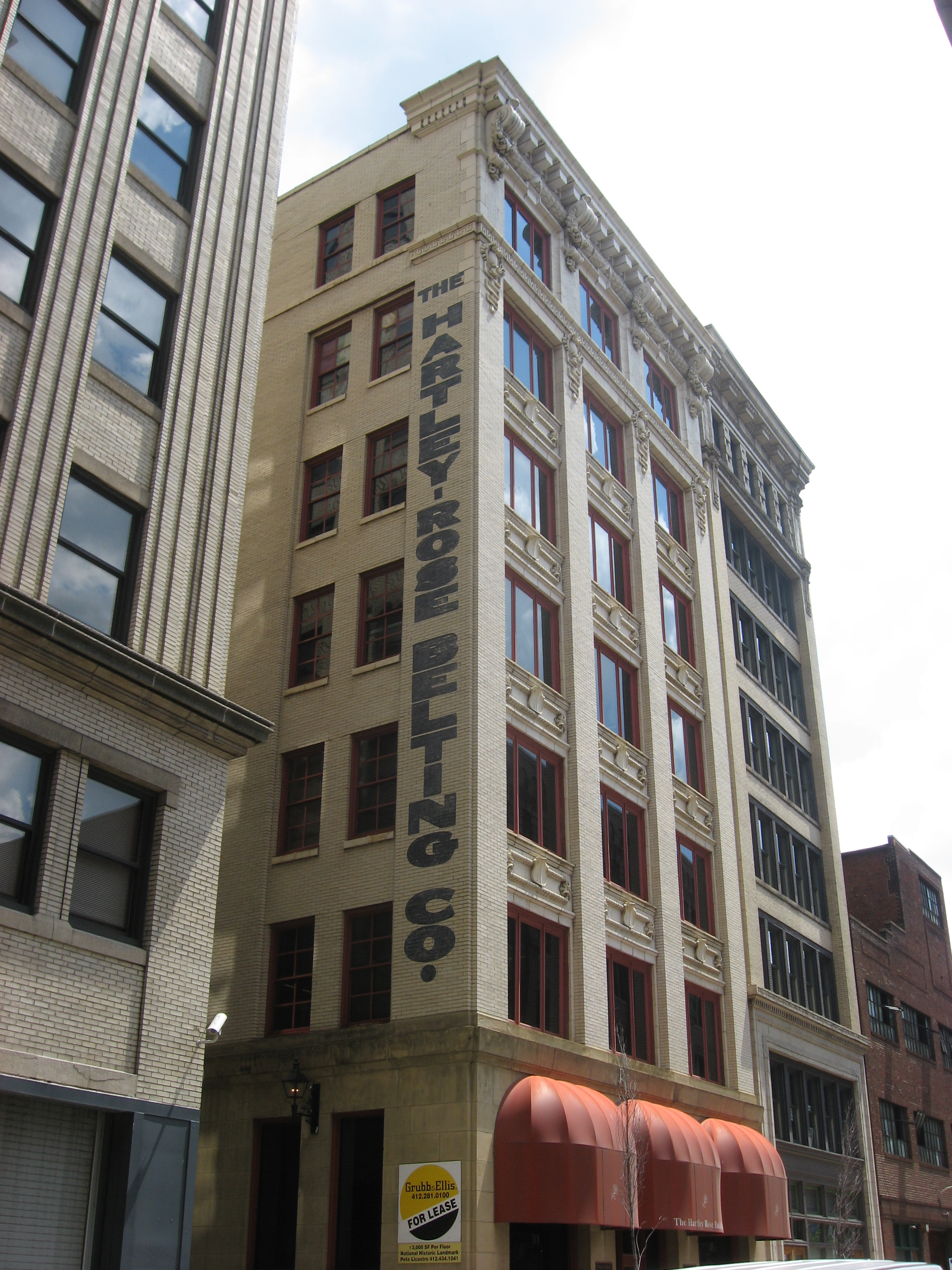
Hartley-Rose Belting Company Building, 1907, on First Avenue, Downtown

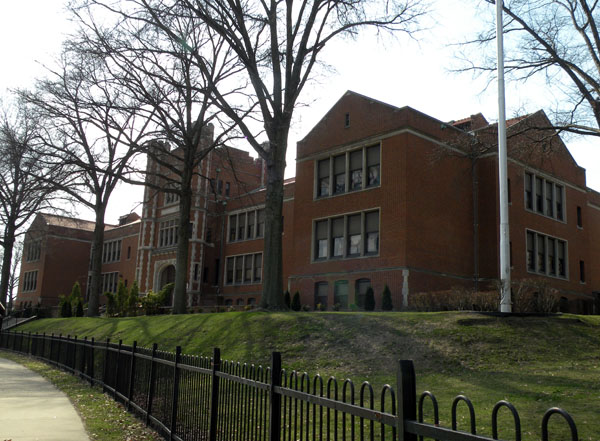
Colfax Elementary School, built 1911, at Beechwood Boulevard and Phillips Avenue in the Squirrel Hill neighborhood.

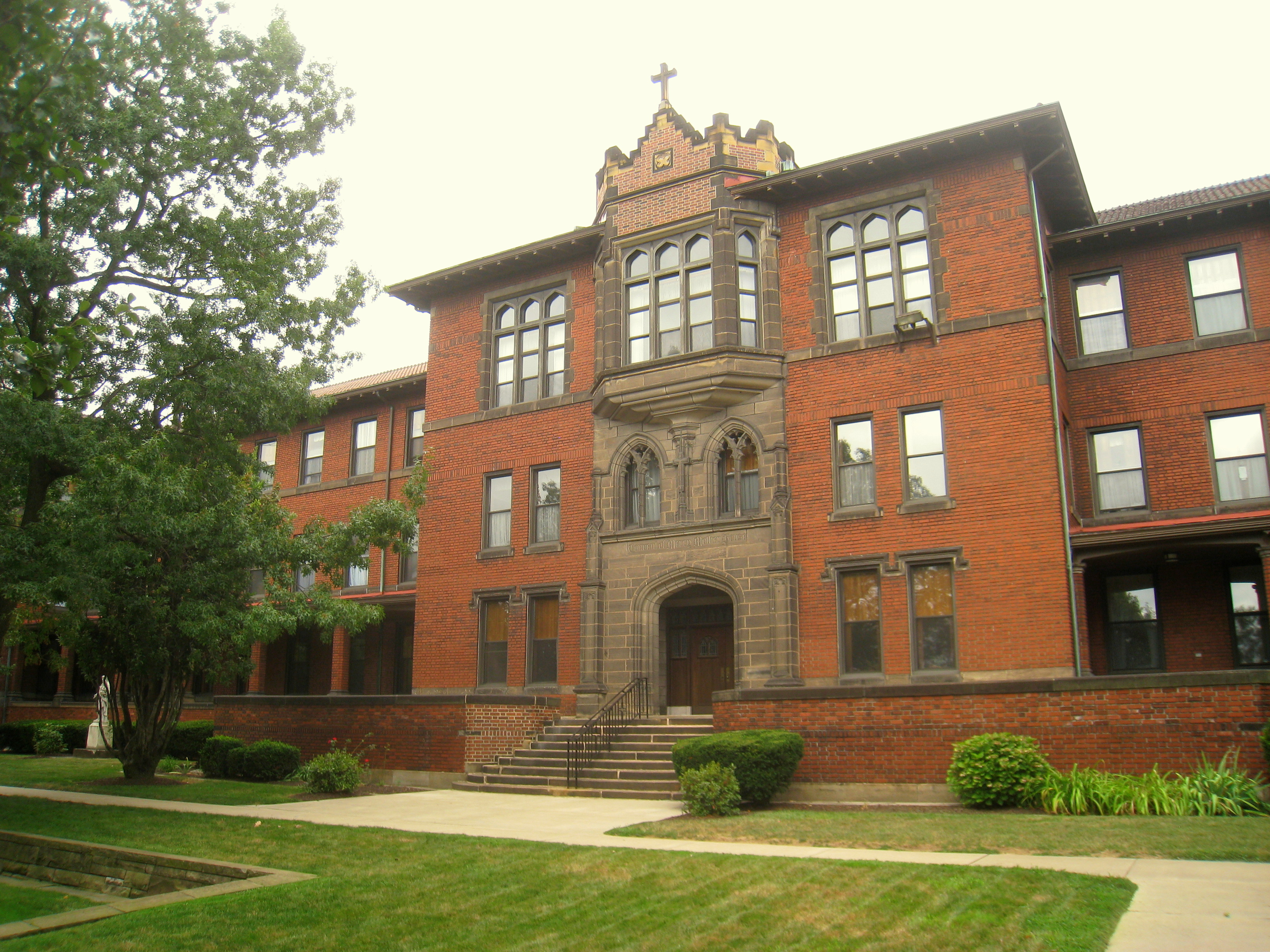
Convent of Mercy, 1911, located along Fifth Avenue in Oakland

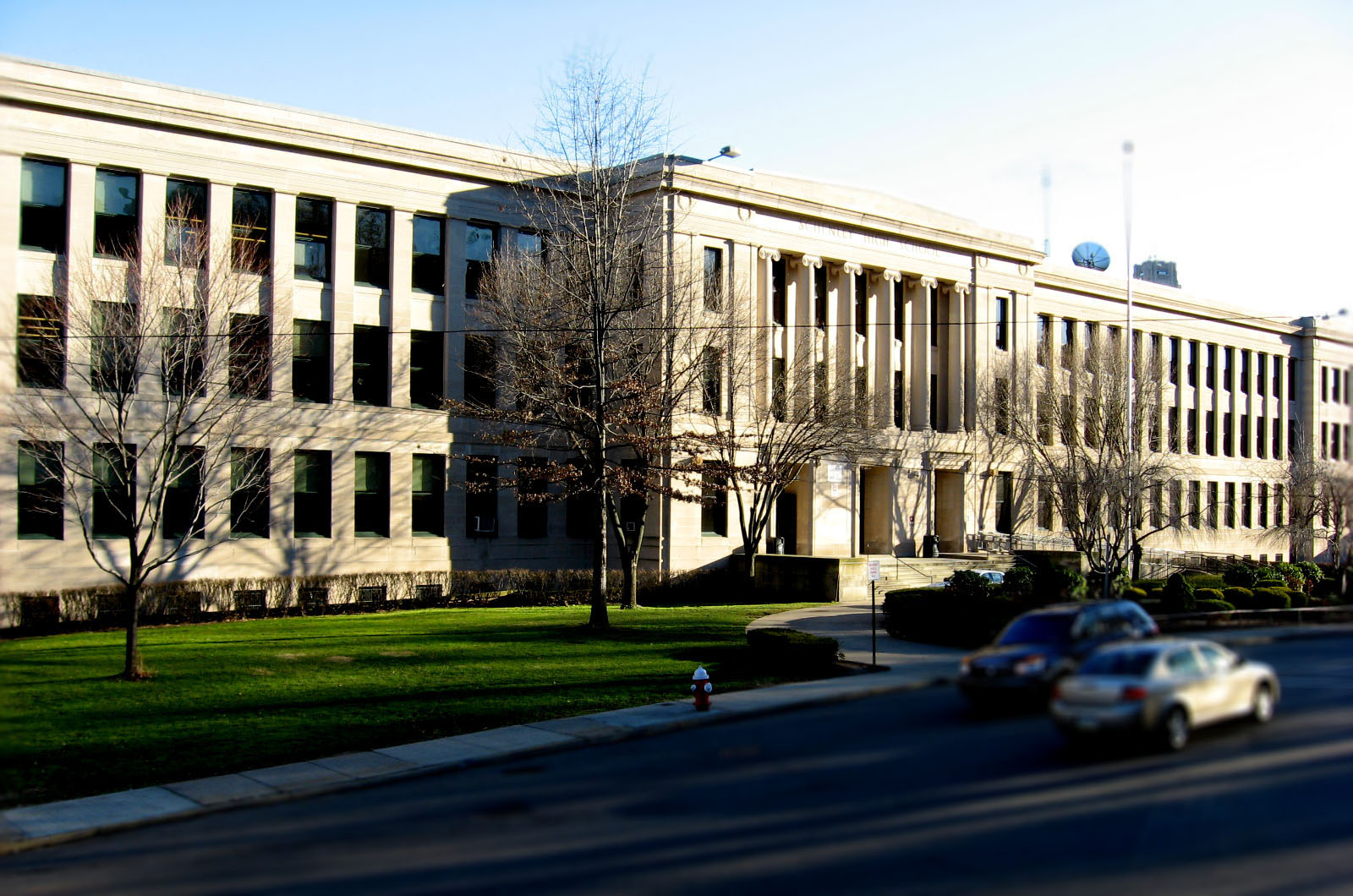
Schenley High School, 1915–16, also in (North) Oakland

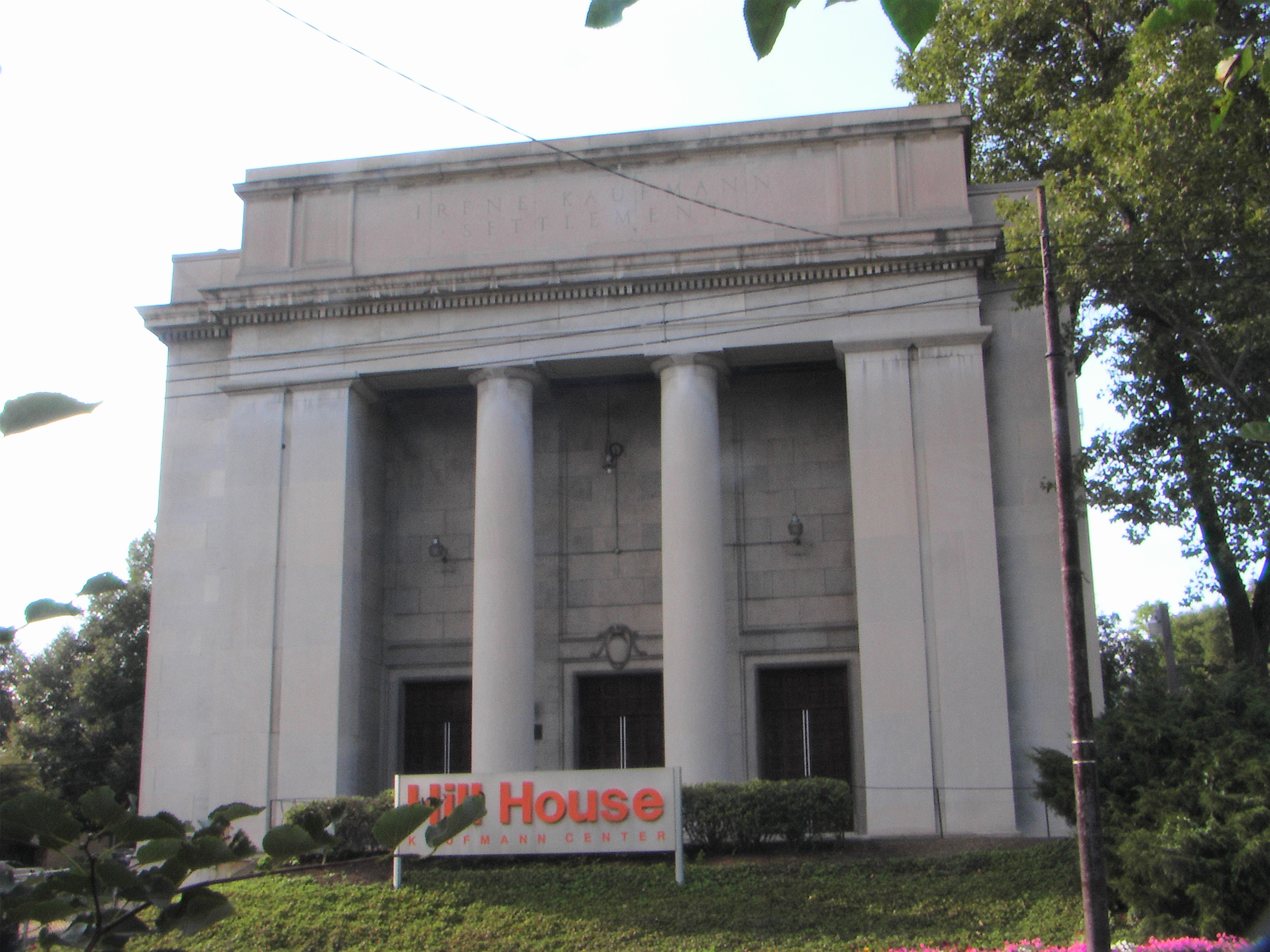
Kaufmann Auditorium, 1928, in the Hill District

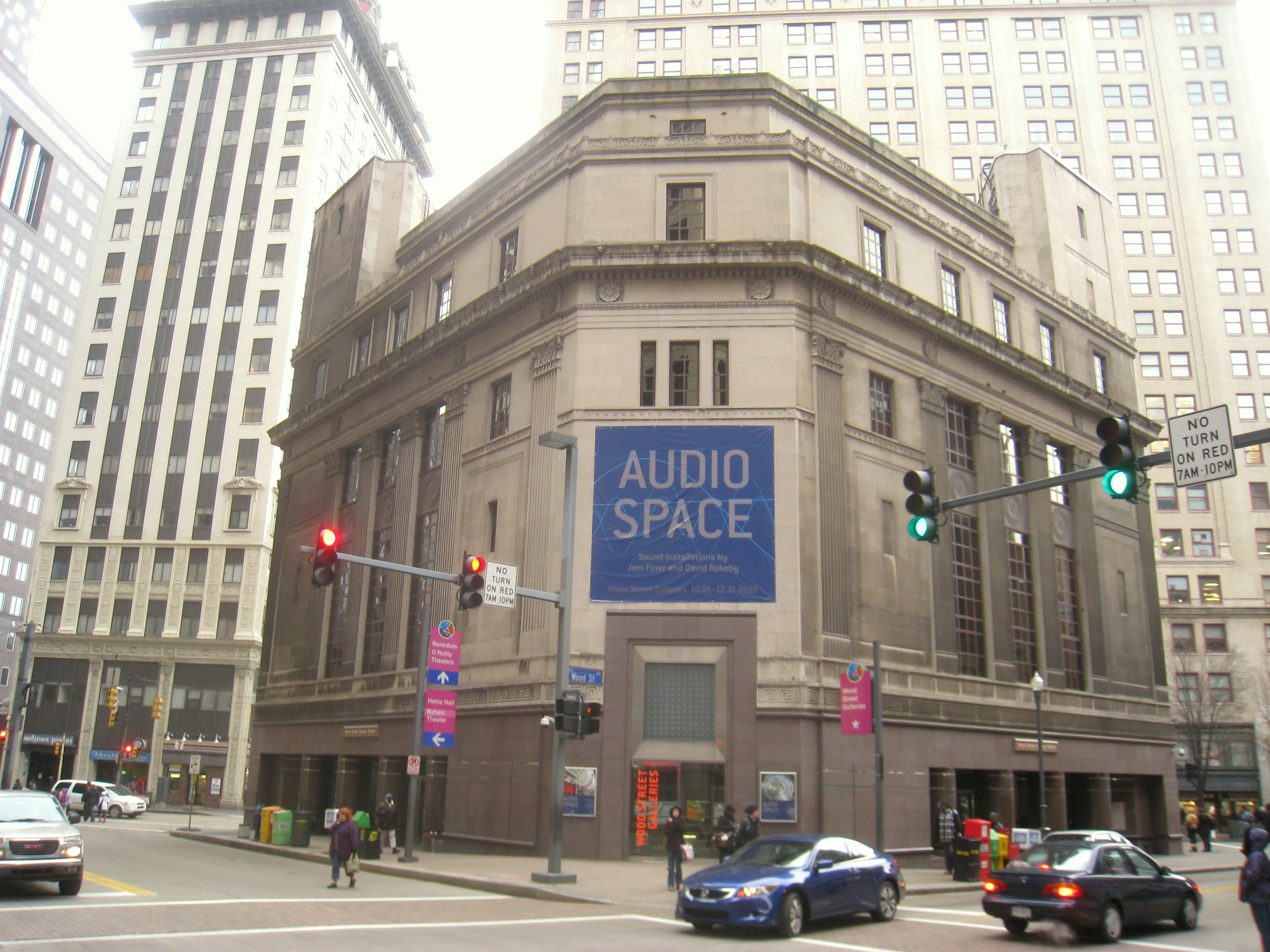
Monongahela Bank building, 1927, Downtown, now houses the Wood Street Galleries
