= Brentwood High School (Pennsylvania) =

Location
- 3601 Brownsville Road; Pittsburgh, Pennsylvania, 15227; United States
- Coordinates: 40°22′27″N 79°58′27″W

Information
- Type: Public
- School district: Brentwood Borough School District
- Principal: Jason Olexa
- Staff: 28.90 (FTE)
- Grades: 9–12
- Student to teacher ratio: 11.94
- Colors: Blue; Gold
- Team name: Spartans
- Website: www.bb-sd.com/brentwoodhighschool_home.aspx

Brentwood High School is a public high school located in Brentwood, Pennsylvania, outside of Pittsburgh, that serves students in grades 9 through 12. It is part of the Brentwood Borough School District. The school building also includes Brentwood Middle School, which houses the district's students in grades 6–8.

== History ==
The high school first started in 1925 in the basement of the existing Elroy Elementary School and only taught the ninth grade. In 1932, a new high school was built alongside the current Brentwood Park. However, this was only one building. The building received its first addition in 1939 to accommodate the rapid increase in population. Another addition was completed in 1959, which offered more rooms and the school's first gymnasium. A new four-story building was constructed in 1971 that included a swimming pool and more classrooms.

The building had its latest renovation in 1999 in which a new academic wing was constructed. While the new wing was being built, the classrooms in the 1971 building were demolished and replaced with the second gymnasium, alongside more extracurricular rooms. This is now where grades 9-12 are taught, with grades 6-8 being taught in the 1932-59 buildings.

== Extracurriculars ==
The district offers a wide variety of clubs, band, musical, other activities and sports.

=== Sports programs ===
- Girls Volleyball
- Boys Basketball
- Girls Basketball
- Football
- Girls Softball
- Baseball
- Boys Soccer
- Cross Country
- Swimming
- Track and Field
- Golf
- Cheerleading

== Notable alumni ==
- Robert W. Bazley, former general in the United States Air Force - Class of 1943
- Bob Cranmer, former chairman of the Allegheny County Board of County Commissioners - Class of 1974
- Michael J. Fisher, retired chief of the United States Border Patrol - Class of 1982
- Scott Radecic, professional football player in the NFL - Class of 1980
- Joe Schmidt, professional football player in the National Football League (NFL), head coach for Detroit Lions, member of Pro Football Hall of Fame - Class of circa 1949
