= Kent Stotz =

American motorcycle racer

- Nationality: American
- Born: April 7, 1958 (age 68) Chicago, Illinois
- Debut season: 1981
- Current team: Stotz Racing
- Former teams: Mr. Turbo Funny Bike

Championship titles
- 1995, 1998, 2001, 2002: AMA Prostar Street Bike Shootout National Champion

Awards
- 2001: AMA/Prostar Rider of the Year award

Kent Stotz is an American motorcycle racer and founder of the Stotz Racing motorcycle team. Stotz has won four AMA Prostar Street Bike Shootout National Championships and broken the speed record multiple times.

== Early career ==
Stotz began motorcycle racing at the age of 19. He started in motocross, but was told he was too old to go to nationals. He then turned to drag racing. From 1981 to 1986, he worked with T.J. Hofmeister on the Mr. Turbo Funny Bike team as a mechanic and racer. Stotz worked closely with the AMA to develop rules that would eventually govern the AMA/Prostar Streetbike Shootout class.

== Stotz Racing ==
Kent started Stotz Racing in 1992, winning his first championship in 1995. After his new title though, his family and home business started to take time out of the time spent on the track. It wasn't until 1998 that he had won his next AMA Prostar championship. In 1999, he was called by Charlie Keller of the Honda Rider's Club of America and was asked to use their CBR1100XX in trade for a sponsorship.

In 1999, Stotz set a new speed record of 180.75 mph. The very next year he broke it again and set the bar to 185.15 mph. In 2001, he set the national record for time and speed at 7.75 seconds at 189.31 mph and won his third championship. His fourth and final championship came in 2002. In 2004, he broke the national records 7 times and was the first person to set a 200 mph record.
