= Church of the Epiphany (Pittsburgh) =

Roman Catholic church in Pittsburgh, Pennsylvania

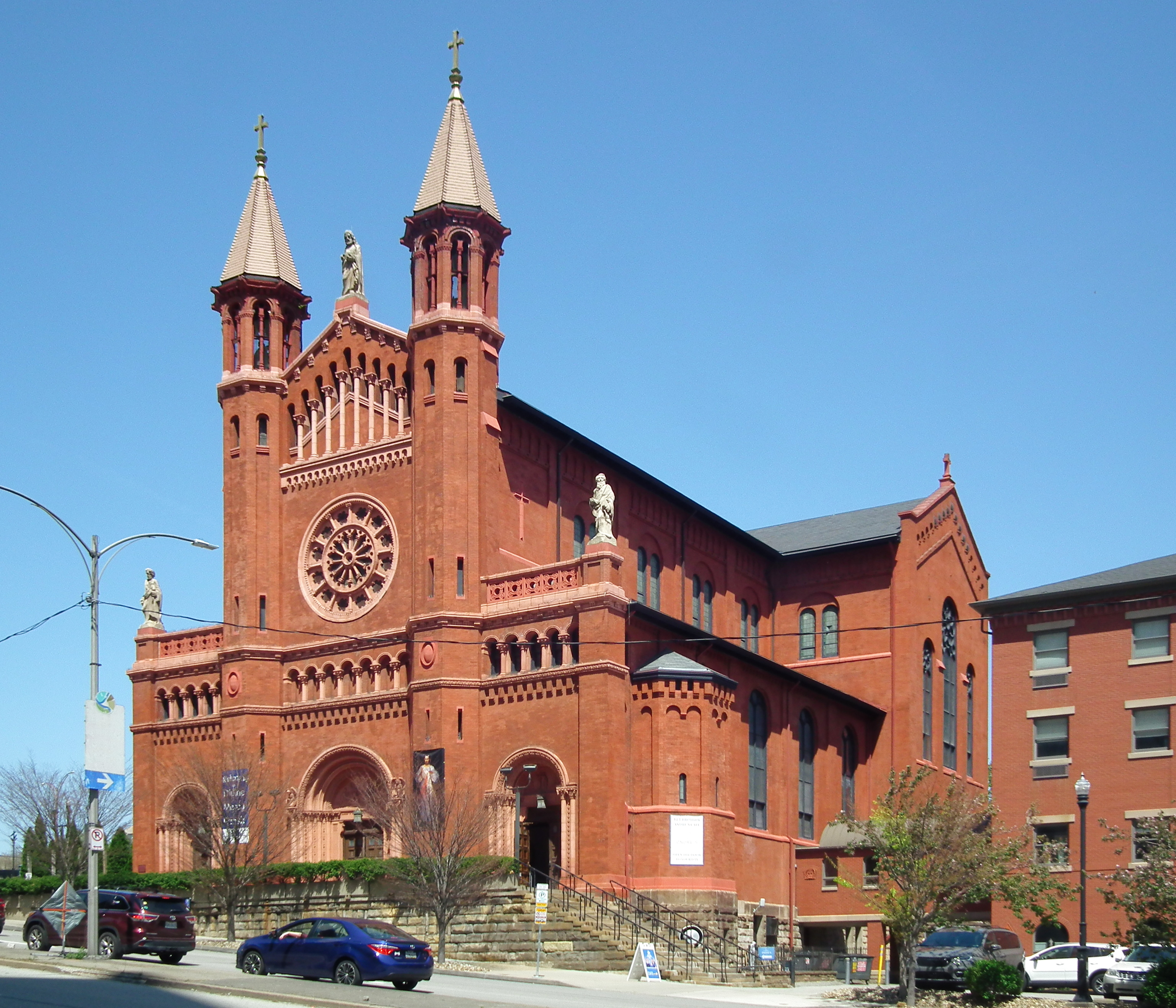

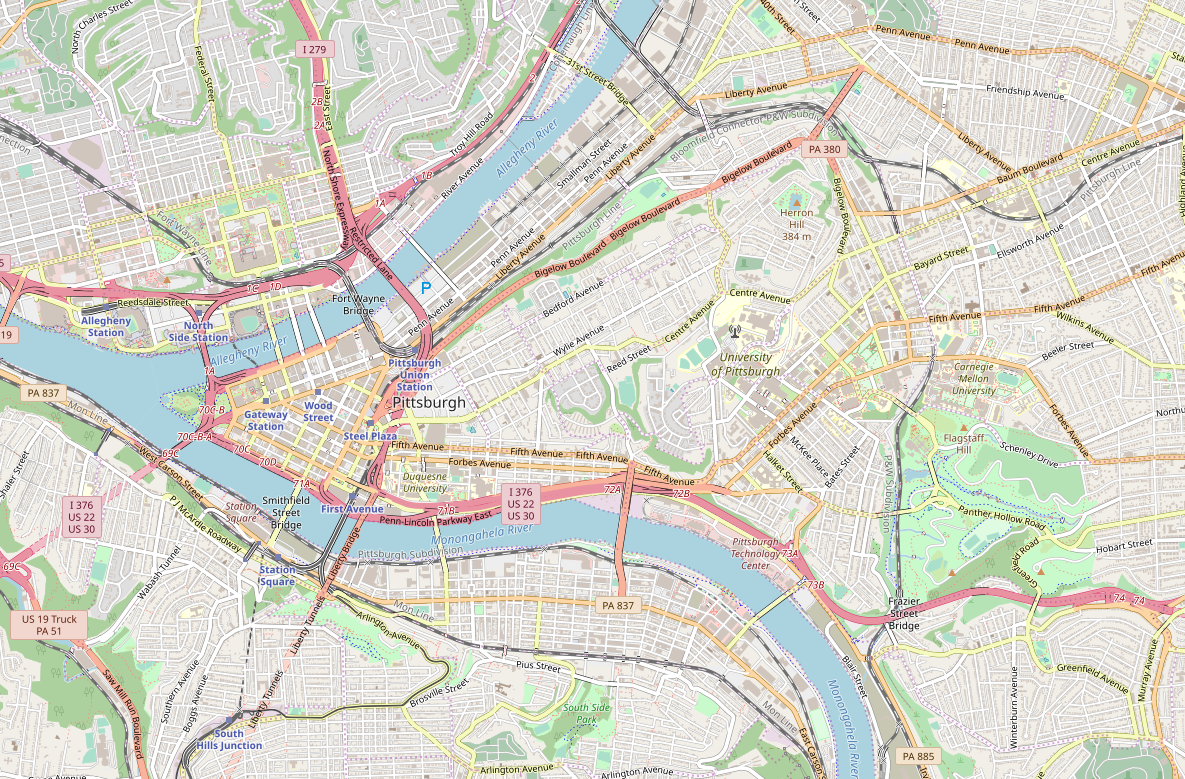
- Location of the Church of the Epiphany in Downtown Pittsburgh
- 40°26′24.12″N 79°59′26.41″W
- Location: Washington Place and Centre Avenue (Hill District), Pittsburgh, Pennsylvania, USA

History
- Built: 1902

Site notes
- Architect: Edward Stotz

Pittsburgh Landmark – PHLF
- Designated: 1998

Church of the Epiphany is a church located at Washington Place and Centre Avenue in the Hill District neighborhood of Pittsburgh, Pennsylvania, was built in 1902. The church was added to the List of Pittsburgh History and Landmarks Foundation Historic Landmarks in 1998. It is situated next to PPG Paints Arena.
