= Phillips Park (Pittsburgh) =

Park in Carrick, Pittsburgh, United States

Coordinates: 40.3910°N 79.9915°W

- Interactive map of Phillips Park
- Type: Municipal Park
- Location: Pittsburgh, Pennsylvania
- Operator: Pittsburgh Department of Parks & Recreation

Phillips Park is an urban park in Carrick, a neighborhood of Pittsburgh.

== History ==
Also known as Dilly's Grove, Southern Park and Carrick Park, it was originally a Trolley Park with vaudeville acts, roller coasters, merry go rounds and other attractions. At one time, it was at the end of the line for public transit from Pittsburgh. Dilly's Grove was purchased in 1904 for $29,000. The park is named for John MacFarlane Phillips, who organized the first Boy Scout troop in Pennsylvania.

== Present Facilities ==
Phillips Park is known for its Disc Golf Course.
