= Wigman House =

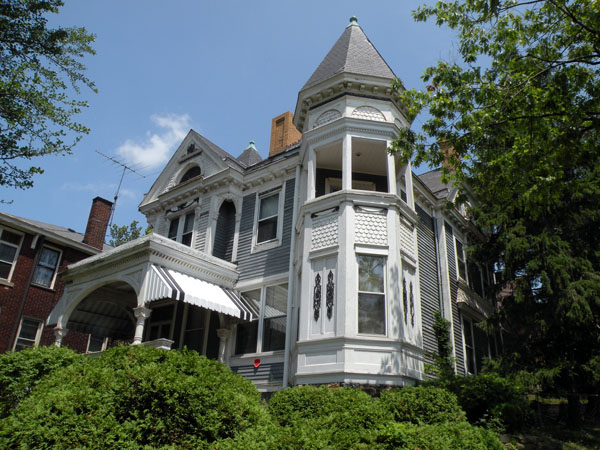

- Location within Pittsburgh
- 40°24′4.5″N 79°59′20.3″W
- Location: 1425 Brownsville Road; Carrick neighborhood, Pittsburgh, Pennsylvania

History
- Built: 1888

Site notes
- Area: 2,782 square feet (258.5 m^{2})
- Governing body: Lewis Family

The Wigman House is a historic American Queen Anne house in the Carrick neighborhood of Pittsburgh, Pennsylvania. It is a City of Pittsburgh Designated Historic Structure.

The four-bedroom home was constructed in 1896 for William H. Wigman, the owner of Wigman Lumber on the South Side. At the time, Carrick, which sits upon a hilltop south of Pittsburgh, was a popular neighborhood for wealthy entrepreneurs who sought to escape the smoke of the city. The Wigman House is all that remains from this area known as "Millionaire's Row"

Since 1952, the house has been owned by the McClory family; in 2011 they placed the property for sale, seeking $150,000, a move that set local preservationists into action. The owner of a neighboring funeral home, Congressman Harry Readshaw, considered purchasing and demolishing the building for parking for his funeral home, across the street from the property. Members of the Carrick-Overbrook Historical Society sought to block Readshaw's purchase by nominating the home for historic status, calling it "the last remaining example of several homes of the wealthy South Side gentry who lived in Carrick." The owners, the McClory family, opposed the nomination, concerned that the designation would harm its chances to sell. The Young Preservationists Association of Pittsburgh identifies the building as a top-priority historic preservation opportunity.

In April 2011, the city's Historic Review Commission approved the historical society's application, setting the stage for contentious hearings before the Pittsburgh City Council.

The historic status was opposed by City Councilman Ricky Burgess, expressing a concern about the rights of the house's current owners. In a reversal, the current owners changed their position on the historic status in a letter to the Council, citing historic tax credits and the possibility that the house's historic value could be a selling point.
