= Brentwood, Pennsylvania =

Borough in Pennsylvania, US

- Borough
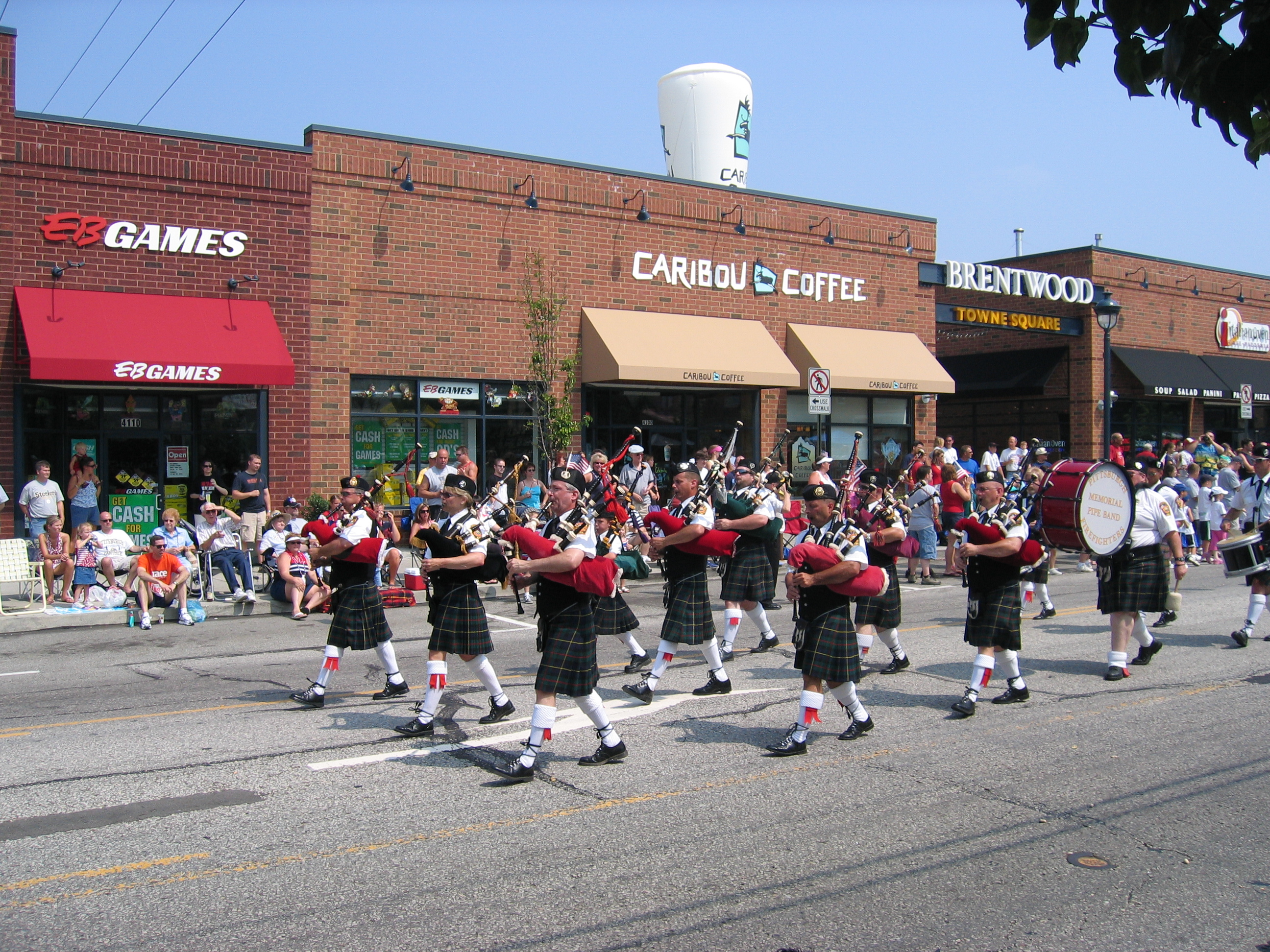
- 4th of July celebration at Brentwood Towne Square

- Location in Allegheny County and the U.S. state of Pennsylvania
- Coordinates: 40°22′28″N 79°58′34″W
- Country: United States
- State: Pennsylvania
- County: Allegheny
- Incorporated: May 15, 1916

Government
  - Mayor: Pasquale Carnevale

Area
  - Total: 1.45 sq mi (3.75 km^{2})
  - Land: 1.45 sq mi (3.75 km^{2})
  - Water: 0 sq mi (0.00 km^{2})
- Elevation: 1,225 ft (373 m)

Population (2020)
  - Total: 10,082
  - Density: 6,959.7/sq mi (2,687.16/km^{2})
- Time zone: UTC-5 (EST)
  - Summer (DST): UTC-4 (EDT)
- ZIP code: 15227
- Area code: 412
- FIPS code: 42-08416
- School District: Brentwood Borough School District
- Website: https://brentwoodpa.gov/

Brentwood is a borough in Allegheny County, Pennsylvania, United States. The population was 10,082 at the 2020 census. It is a residential suburb of the Pittsburgh metropolitan area.

== History ==
Brentwood, located approximately 6 miles (10 km) from downtown Pittsburgh and is 101 years old, was once an integral part of Baldwin Township, which included the villages of Brentwood, Point View, and Whitehall.

In 1914, a group of citizens in the village of Brentwood took a set of grievances to the Baldwin Township Board of Commissioners, regarding the lack of sidewalks, sewers, fire protection, police, and a school house. Upon further disregard of these necessities from the township, a group of men from the village held a meeting on January 27, 1915, to discuss secession. After considerable discussion, the boundary lines of Brentwood were finalized by the Board of Trade. Building a sidewalk along Brownsville Road was the first official action taken by the Board of Trade. On November 6, 1915, the Quarter Sessions Court of Allegheny County decreed that Brentwood was officially seceded from Baldwin Township. The proceedings to incorporate were filed on May 15, 1916, creating the Borough of Brentwood.

On December 4, 1915, special elections were held to elect a burgess, auditors, justices of the peace, high constable, tax collector, assessor, and councilmen. Brentwood's first burgess was Bernard Kestner, sworn in on December 9, 1915. He served Brentwood for sixteen years. The board met monthly and continued to discuss necessary steps for the structure of the borough.

On Labor Day, 1928, the borough celebrated the official opening of the park, pool, and paving of Brownsville Road.

A former councilman of Brentwood, Bob Cranmer, served as an Allegheny County commissioner, 1996–2000. He was involved with a number of historic government initiatives and large civic development projects, being both local and regional in scope.

A Hall of Fame NFL linebacker, Joe Schmidt played for Brentwood High School.

== Geography and climate ==
Brentwood is located at 40°22′28″N 79°58′34″W (40.374469, -79.976179). According to the United States Census Bureau, the borough has a total area of 1.5 square miles (3.9 km^{2}), all land.

The borough is in the Allegheny Plateau region of the United States, and is situated 5 miles (8 km) south of the confluence of the Allegheny River and the Monongahela River to form the Ohio River.

Due to its position between the Great Lakes and the windward side of the Allegheny Mountains, Brentwood, along with the rest of the region, receives plentiful precipitation which supports lush vegetation. Also, because it is on the windward side of the mountains, it is often cloudy, having 203 cloudy days per year. The winter is particularly cloudy, with only 28 percent sunshine in December and 23 cloudy days. In the winter, when a northwest flow establishes itself over the Great Lakes, the wind blows from Lake Erie across eastern Ohio and western Pennsylvania. That wind carries moist air from the lake, producing clouds and heavy snow squalls.

=== Surrounding communities ===
Brentwood has three borders, including Baldwin to the east and northeast, Whitehall to the south and west, and the Pittsburgh neighborhood of Carrick to the northwest.

== Demographics ==
Historical population
Census	Pop.	Note	%±
1920	1,695		—
1930	5,381		217.5%
1940	7,552		40.3%
1950	12,535		66.0%
1960	13,706		9.3%
1970	13,760		0.4%
1980	11,907		−13.5%
1990	10,823		−9.1%
2000	10,466		−3.3%
2010	9,643		−7.9%
2020	10,082		4.6%

=== 2020 census ===
As of the 2020 census, Brentwood had a population of 10,082. The median age was 38.3 years. 19.5% of residents were under the age of 18 and 16.1% of residents were 65 years of age or older. For every 100 females there were 97.5 males, and for every 100 females age 18 and over there were 94.1 males age 18 and over.

100.0% of residents lived in urban areas, while 0.0% lived in rural areas.

There were 4,498 households in Brentwood, of which 24.9% had children under the age of 18 living in them. Of all households, 37.0% were married-couple households, 22.9% were households with a male householder and no spouse or partner present, and 30.2% were households with a female householder and no spouse or partner present. About 35.9% of all households were made up of individuals and 11.8% had someone living alone who was 65 years of age or older.

There were 4,863 housing units, of which 7.5% were vacant. The homeowner vacancy rate was 1.1% and the rental vacancy rate was 9.0%.

Racial composition as of the 2020 census
Race	Number	Percent
White	8,080	80.1%
Black or African American	573	5.7%
American Indian and Alaska Native	25	0.2%
Asian	713	7.1%
Native Hawaiian and Other Pacific Islander	3	0.0%
Some other race	186	1.8%
Two or more races	502	5.0%
Hispanic or Latino (of any race)	343	3.4%

=== 2000 census ===
As of the census of 2000, there were 10,466 people, 4,658 households, 2,762 families, residing in the borough. The population density was 7,237.2 inhabitants per square mile (2,794.3/km^{2}). There were 4,895 housing units at an average density of 3,384.9 per square mile (1,306.9/km^{2}). The racial makeup of the borough was 97.95% White, 0.54% African American, 0.24% Native American, 0.54% Asian, 0.01% Pacific Islander, 0.21% from other races, and 0.52% from two or more races. Hispanic or Latino people of any race were 0.69% of the population.

There were 4,658 households, out of which 26.1% had children under the age of 18 living with them, 44.6% were married couples living together, 11.2% had a female householder with no husband present, and 40.7% were non-families. 35.9% of all households were made up of individuals, and 14.3% had someone living alone who was 65 years of age or older. The average household size was 2.24 and the average family size was 2.95.

In the borough the population was spread out, with 21.2% under the age of 18, 7.8% from 18 to 24, 31.7% from 25 to 44, 21.4% from 45 to 64, and 17.8% who were 65 years of age or older. The median age was 39 years. For every 100 females, there were 90.7 males. For every 100 females age 18 and over, there were 84.6 males.

The median income for a household in the borough was $37,013, and the median income for a family was $48,552. Males had a median income of $36,097 versus $29,526 for females. The per capita income for the borough was $20,024. About 4.8% of families and 6.1% of the population were below the poverty line, including 7.0% of those under age 18 and 6.2% of those age 65 or over.

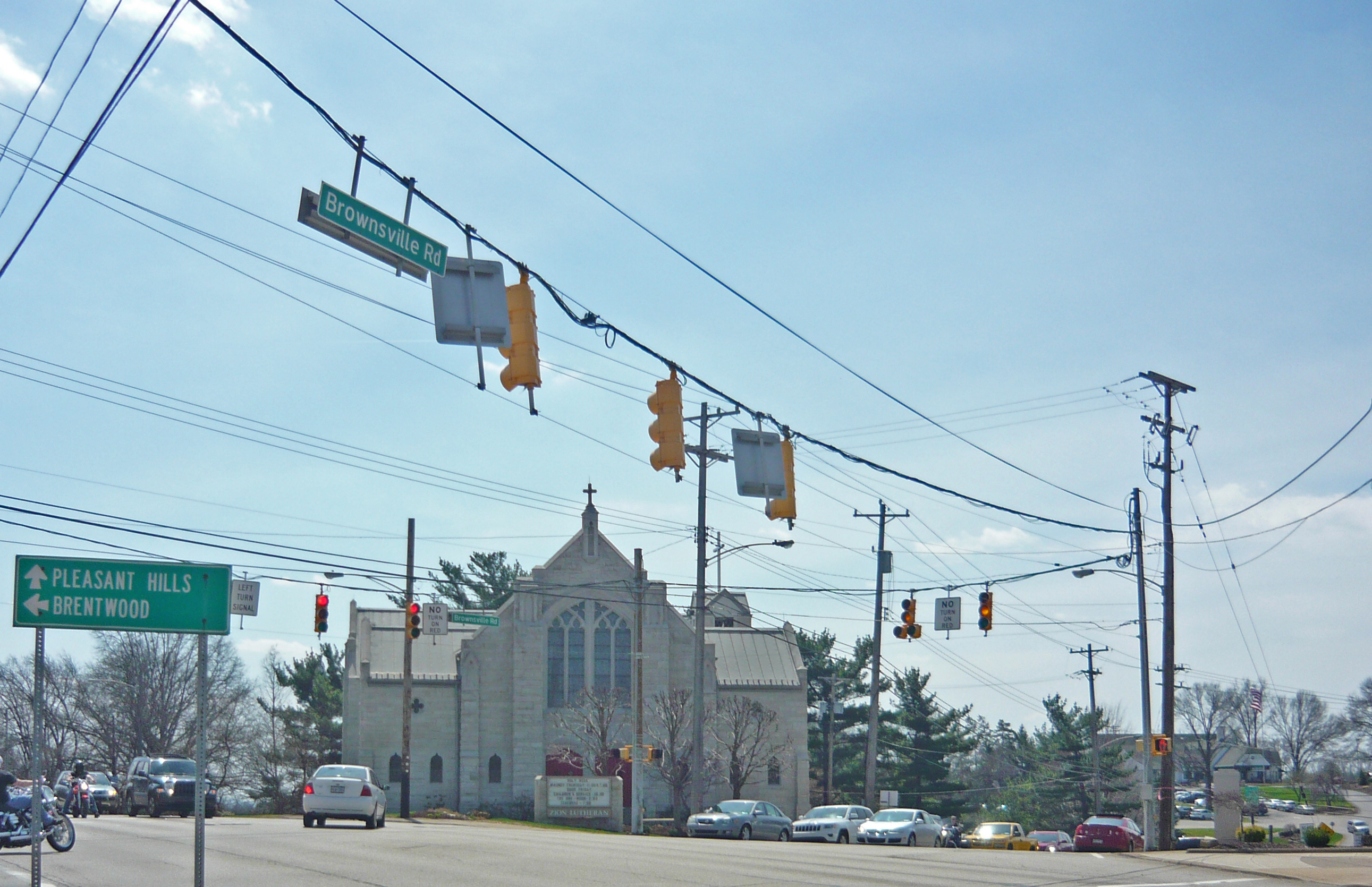
Brownsville Road and Clairton Boulevard

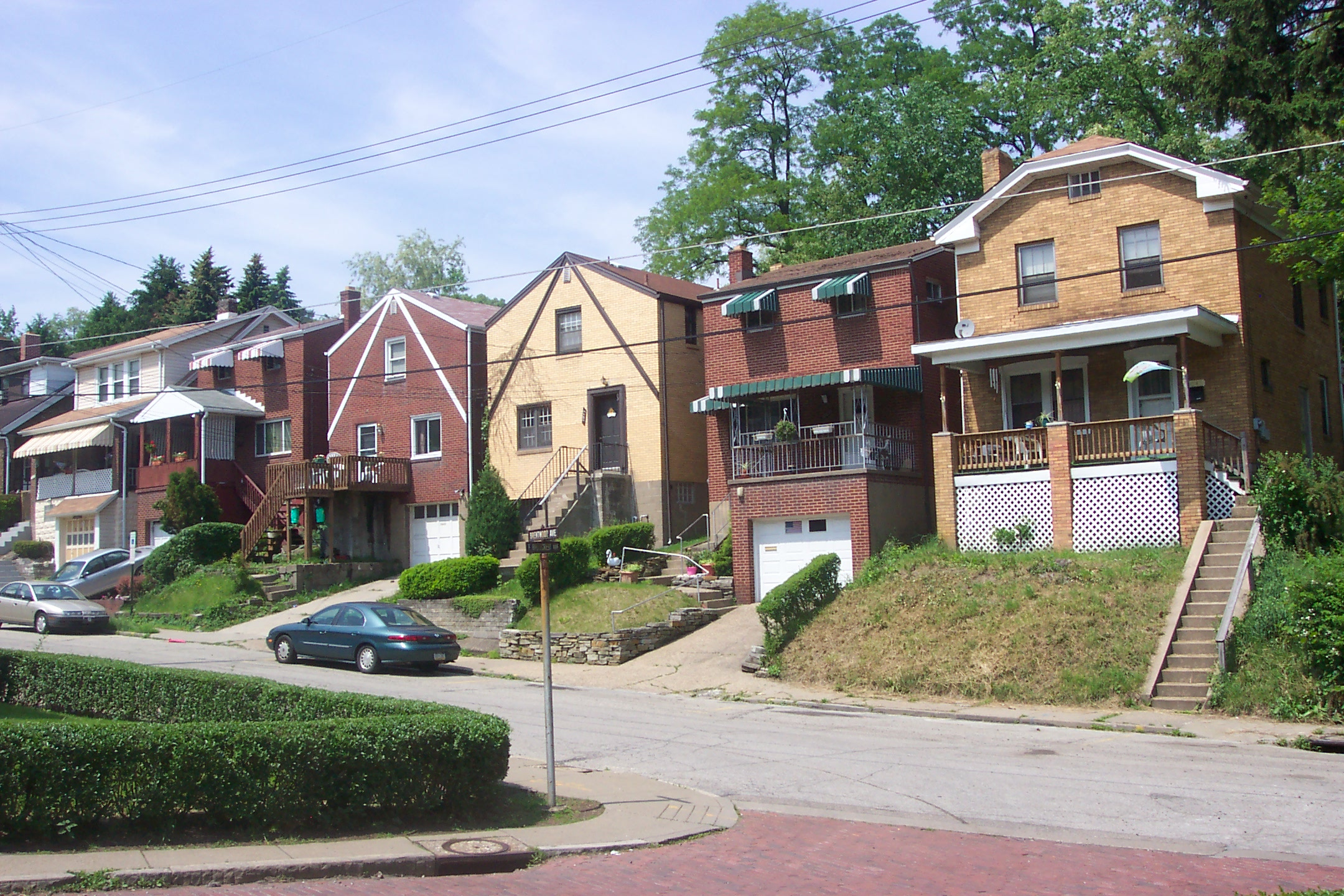
Brentwood Avenue at East Bellecrest Avenue

== Economy ==
Brentwood has a neighborhood main street (Brownsville Road) with businesses that stretch from the southern border of the Pittsburgh area to the northern border of Whitehall Borough. More recently, Brentwood Towne Square was built along Brownsville Road and Route 51. Many shops, restaurants, and offices are in the square.

== Arts and culture ==
Brownsville Road follows the route of a pre-Columbian era Native American Indian trail and footpaths connecting Redstone Old Fort with the "forks of the Ohio", a distance of 26 miles (42 km). It later became the road connecting Pittsburgh with Brownsville, Pennsylvania, and from there via Nemacolin's Path to Virginia and points further east. It was a major route for travel by stagecoach and Conestoga wagon. The road was significant during the Whiskey Rebellion, particularly its southern half. It has had several names over its history, including the Red Stone Road and the Brownsville Plank Road, or Southern Avenue.

The Point View Hotel dates back to 1832. General Andrew Jackson spent a night there before he entered Pittsburgh while campaigning for the presidency. General Zachary Taylor stopped for a night as well. President James Buchanan and Senator Thaddeus Stevens stayed on two occasions. Not only did the hotel have many guests who were quite important people, but the basement of the hotel was a stop on the Underground Railroad during the 1850s. The hotel was then turned into a restaurant and bar until the property was sold and demolished in November 2006, as it was never officially recognized as a historic landmark. A medical office building has been built on this site.

The John F. Slater Funeral Home, formerly the White Hall Tavern, was another important place in Brentwood's history. In the earlier days of Brentwood's time, many city dwellers rode stagecoaches on Brownsville Road, because this was the only major roadway connecting the cities of Pittsburgh and Brownsville. The White Hall Tavern was just a short walk to the race track which was once on the site of the South Hills Country Club, which is why many people from the city stopped here for relaxation.

The Windsor Hotel was opened in 1882. Although there was a fire sixteen years later, it was rebuilt and remained a popular place for vacationers.

The Davis Farm House was another historical place in Brentwood's history, although it was gained by the borough in 1968. The house and grounds became a senior citizens’ recreation center. Much debate was encountered when it was considered being torn down to build a new firehouse and recreation room. Although the house had been considered a historical site by much of the town, it was eventually torn down, and the new fire house was built in place of the senior citizens’ center.

The Cowan Farm House at 4111 Brownsville Road, is an example of the early architecture of Brentwood. The estate and farm comprised the property is located at 4111 Brownsville Road and much of the surrounding area. The early Cowan family was a major landowner in Brentwood.

=== Brentwood Arboretum ===
The arboretum was founded in 1997 by members of the community. It is located on the grounds of the Brentwood School District, the Brentwood Library, and the Brentwood Park, and the land is owned by each respective body. The collection of trees comprises extant and new specimens planted by the community, library, and school district. Community members hope to extend the collection during the renovations at the park.

The collection includes:

- Ginkgo (Ginkgo Biloba): Three specimen trees directly in front of the middle-high school
- Japanese larch (Larix kaempferi): Two specimens at the northern entrance to the middle-high school adjacent to the library
- Goldenrain tree (Koelreuteria paniculata): Four specimens in front of the middle-high school
- Tulip tree (Liriodendron tulipifera): Two specimen trees along Brownsville Road adjacent to the middle-high school
- American elm "Princeton" (Ulmus americana): Eleven specimens along Brownsville and Pointview roads
- Little leaf linden (Tilia cordata): Three specimens in front of the building facing Brownsville Road, including one planted in 1939
- Red maple (Acer rubrum): Seven specimens in a line behind the old gymnasium
- Dawn redwood (Metasequoia glyptostroboides): Three specimens between the library and its new wing
- Mulberry (Morus): One specimen to the right of the front auditorium doors of the high school
- Norway maple (Acer platanoides): One specimen at the corner of Park Drive and Brownsville Road in front of the library
- Redbud (Cercis): One specimen in front of the middle-high school
- Spruce (Picea): Five specimens at the north side of the "old gym" of the high school and park
- Slippery elm (Ulmus rubra): One specimen at Brownsville Road in front of the library
- Silver maple (Acer saccharinum): Two specimens along Park Drive in front of the library
- American sycamore (Platanus occidentalis): Two specimens along Brownsville Road in front of the library

=== Library ===
Brentwood's public library is located at the center of the borough on Brownsville Road, at the entrance of Brentwood Park. Patrons can borrow books, movies, puppets, puzzles, magazines, and CDs. There is a children's area, and there are computers for public access to the internet. The library hosts many children's events throughout the year, including story times and visitations by authors. For adults, the library hosts educational classes, informational meetings, and book clubs.

The library was founded in 1947 as a project of the Moore School PTA. Originally the library was in the basement of the Moore School. It then moved to the Brentwood Borough building in the area then occupied by the Brentwood EMS, and was torn down sometime during 2024. On July 4, 1990, the library moved to the existing facility, which was newly built with a main reading room, meeting rooms, and community room.

== Parks and recreation ==
The Brentwood High School Spartans play football, soccer, baseball, and softball, in the local park. Brentwood Borough opened the park and pool on July 4, 1928, but it was not until 1948 that the football stadium, track, four baseball fields, tennis courts, and basketball courts were built.

In 2013, the Brentwood Park underwent roughly $8 million (~$10.6 million in 2024) in comprehensive improvements. The project was spearheaded by the Brentwood Park Initiative, the independent committee helping to raise funds and community awareness. The renovations included new turf to replace the grass field at Brentwood Stadium; a quarter-mile rubber track; an in-line dek hockey rink; new basketball and tennis courts; and energy-efficient lighting.

== Government and politics ==
Presidential election results
Year	Republican	Democratic	Third parties
2020	43% 2,294	55% 2,947	1% 79
2016	46% 2,210	49% 2,334	5% 224
2012	45% 2,015	54% 2,401	1% 64

== Education ==
Brentwood is served by the Brentwood Borough School District.

The Court of Common Pleas appointed Brentwood's first school board who took charge of school business in July 1916, and the first group of teachers were hired that same year in September. Brentwood's first school was Moore Elementary School, then only a four-room school house, which is still in use by children and teachers. Because Moore School was not sufficient in size for all the students in the borough, Elroy School was built about three-quarters of a mile away toward Pittsburgh, and renovations were completed in 1925 to both schools.

The first Brentwood High School opened in the basement of Elroy School in September 1925, and only taught through ninth grade. The high school was newly built in 1932 adjacent to the current Brentwood Park. An addition was constructed in 1939 because of the increase in population, and once again in 1959. This renovation included more rooms and a new gymnasium.

In the late 1960s, Pennsylvania experienced a consolidation of school districts. Some wanted the Brentwood school district to be folded into the Baldwin-Whitehall School District. However, this consolidation was never realized, and in 1972 a new four-story building containing classrooms and an indoor pool was constructed.

In the early 1990s the consensus on the school board was to close Moore and Elroy schools and consolidate them into an expanded K-12th grade facility at the existing high school. An intense community debate on whether to close Moore and Elroy schools ensued with the supporters of preserving and rehabilitating Moore and Elroy prevailing. In 1997, the board of directors fully modernized and remodeled Elroy School and Moore School received two new additional classrooms. The district also built a new academic wing to the front of the 1939 building, and a second gymnasium was placed on the demolished third and fourth floors of the 1972 addition.

St. Sylvester School was established in September 1948 as a large church, lunch room, and a small four-classroom Catholic elementary school. St. Sylvester served as Brentwood's parochial elementary school, teaching children from preschool to 8th grade. The Catholic Diocese of Pittsburgh closed the school in 2019.

== Public safety ==
The fire department was organized on December 8, 1915. In 1916, the police department, which was formed only of two men, was developed. In 1977, the EMS was founded.

== Bibliography ==
- Brentwood 1990 Fourth of July Committee. The Borough of Brentwood. 1990. History of Brentwood Allegheny County, Pennsylvania. Brentwood: Borough of Brentwood.

Preceded by Whitehall	Bordering communities of Pittsburgh	Succeeded by West Mifflin
