= Schenley High School =

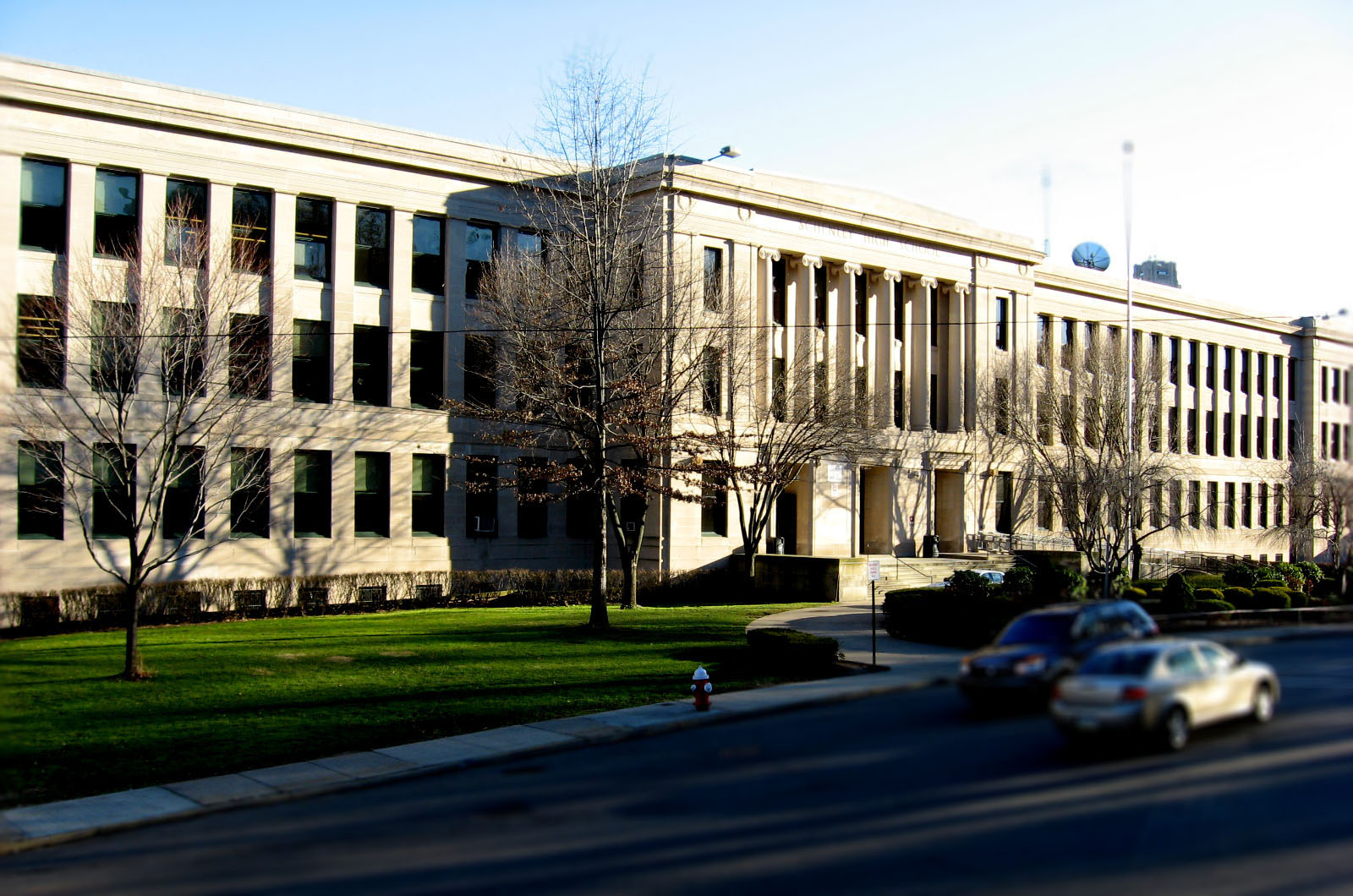

Location
- 4101 Bigelow Blvd, Pittsburgh, Pennsylvania 15213; United States; 40.45028°N 79.95444°W

Information
- Type: Public, Magnet school, International Baccalaureate
- Motto: Enter to Learn, Go Forth to Serve
- Established: October 2, 1916
- Closed: August 2008 (building), June 12, 2011 (final graduating class)
- School district: Pittsburgh Public Schools
- Colors: Red, Black, and White
- Mascot: Spartan
- Website: Schenley High School
- Schenley High School
- U.S. National Register of Historic Places
- U.S. Historic district – Contributing property
- Pittsburgh Landmark – PHLF
- Location: Bigelow Blvd. and Centre Ave., Pittsburgh, Pennsylvania
- Architect: Edward Stotz
- Part of: Schenley Farms Historic District (ID83002213)
- MPS: Pittsburgh Public Schools TR
- NRHP reference No.: 86002706

Significant dates
- Added to NRHP: September 30, 1986
- Designated CP: July 22, 1983
- Designated PHLF: 1992

Schenley High School, located in the North Oakland neighborhood at the edge of the Hill District in Pittsburgh, Pennsylvania, is a historic building opened in 1916 that was a part of the Pittsburgh Public Schools. The Schenley High School building was closed in June 2008 in a 5–4 vote by the school district due to issues with asbestos. Its staff and students were relocated the following year. The Schenley name was retired and its last class graduated in 2011. On February 28, 2013 the Pittsburgh School Board approved the sale of Schenley High School to the PMC Property Group of Philadelphia in a 5–4 vote.

The Schenley building is listed on the National Register of Historic Places (NRHP Reference #86002706). and the Pittsburgh History and Landmarks Foundation Register. It is also a contributing property in the Schenley Farms Historic District.

== History ==
Schenley High School was named for Pittsburgh philanthropist Mary Schenley, on whose land the school was built. It was designed by Edward Stotz as a triangle with rounded corners and constructed of Indiana limestone, the best of its kind. Schenley was the first high school in the United States to cost more than one million dollars to build. When Schenley opened in 1916, there were 1800 students and 70 teachers. Through public donation a Skinner Pipe Organ was donated to the school, the organ remained in the auditorium until the closing of the school. The school published "The Triangle," a monthly student newspaper founded in 1919 and named for the building's original shape. The school's highest enrollment was 3012 in March 1940. Schenley sports teams won many city and state championships, including several state basketball titles in the 1970s. In 1983, the school was rededicated as the Schenley High School Teacher Center, an innovative program in which all of the district's teachers would cycle through Schenley to update methods. The program would be deemed successful enough to warrant a visit from then United States Secretary of Education William Bennet. In 1987, a new wing was added to the building.

== Relocation and closure ==
In June 2008, due to severe maintenance problems, school district Superintendent Mark Roosevelt proposed to close Schenley High School to avoid an extremely high renovation bill. This led to public opposition by students and historical organizations that felt the building was worth saving. After months of debate the school board voted 5-4 to close the school following the 2007–2008 school year. The staff and students were moved to the Reizenstein Middle School building, which had been closed a few years earlier. Freshmen, sophomores and juniors who were enrolled in Schenley at the time of its closure were allowed to graduate as Schenley students. Schenley's final class graduated on June 12, 2011. For future classes, Schenley was renamed to Obama Academy, and the Reizenstein building became a shared space for the two Schools from 2009–2011. Obama Academy, which found a permanent home in the former Peabody high school building beginning in the 2012–2013 school year, preserved much of Schenley's teaching staff throughout the transition, as well as the IB academic curriculum and award-winning musical theater program. Protests to save the original Schenley High building ultimately failed on February 27, 2013 when the Pittsburgh Public Schools board voted, 5–4, to sell the building to a developer who would convert the former school into luxury apartments.

== Me and Earl and the Dying Girl ==
The summer of 2014 saw the Schenley High School building play a starring role in the film Me and Earl and the Dying Girl. The film, based on the 2013 book written by Schenley graduate Jesse Andrews, tells the tale of a Schenley senior who is dealing with coming of age while facing the possibility of losing a sick classmate. For the movie, scenes were filmed throughout Schenley High School, including the auditorium and cafeteria. The school colors in the film, however, were changed from red and black to blue and gold. The film premiered at the 2015 Sundance Film Festival, where it broke records. Distributor Fox Searchlight purchased the rights to the film for an estimated 12 million dollars.

== Notable alumni ==
- William Albertson American Communist politician framed by the FBI
- Jesse Andrews – novelist and screenwriter known for Me and Earl and the Dying Girl.
- Derrick Bell – Harvard Law School's first African American professor
- George Benson – Jazz/R&B musician and recording artist
- DeJuan Blair – Washington Wizards NBA player
- Larry Brown – Washington Redskins player
- Ray Brown – jazz musician
- Billy Cox – bassist who played with Jimi Hendrix
- Frank Curto – chief horticulturist, Pittsburgh Dept. of Parks and Recreation
- Darnell Dinkins – NFL player
- Ken Durrett – NBA player
- Monica Ellis – member of 2024 Grammy award-winning Imani Winds
- Walt Harper – jazz musician
- Pearl Berg – Supercentenarian
- Philip Hershkovitz – mammalogist
- Art Hyatt – NBL pro basketball player
- DeAndre Kane – basketball player in the Israeli Premier League and EuroLeague
- D. J. Kennedy – NBA player
- Bobby Lewis – college baseball coach
- Maurice Lucas – NBA player for 1977 champion Portland Trail Blazers
- Helen MacCloskey – aviator
- Robert Mosley – opera singer
- Bill Nunn – actor
- Bob Prince – Pittsburgh Pirates play-by-play announcer
- Vivian Reed – actress, singer, and dancer
- Bruno Sammartino – Professional wrestler
- Raymond Saunders – Painter, Professor Emeritus
- Clifford Shull – Nobel Prize laureate
- Ted Stepien – Cleveland Cavaliers owner from 1980–1983
- Benjamin Tatar – actor
- Stanley Turrentine – jazz musician
- Andy Warhol – iconic artist
