= Andrew Stotz =

Thai businessman and financier

Andrew Stotz is a Thai businessman who is former president of the CFA Society Thailand and is one of Thailand's award-winning equity analysts. He is also the founder and CEO of A. Stotz Investment Research (ASIR), a financial services company based in Bangkok, Thailand. Prior to launching ASIR he had spent 20 years working global investment banks in Asia. He has also been a university lecturer in finance for more than two decades and is a co-founder of CoffeeWORKS Co. Ltd., Thailand's specialty coffee roaster.

== Education ==
He graduated with a Bachelor of Science degree in finance and an MBA from California State University. He earned his Ph.D. in finance at the University of Science and Technology of China, in Hefei, Anhui province.

== Career ==
Andrew Stotz is the founder and current CEO of A. Stotz Investment Research (ASIR), providing institutional investors and fund managers with financial services such as valuation, stock selection, and portfolio creation in Asian markets, based on the proprietary FVMR methodology. The methodology is aimed to not only favor one style such as value or growth, but instead considers four elements Fundamentals, Valuation, Momentum, and Risk—FVMR. In addition, Stotz is a former president of the CFA Society of Thailand, a public speaker on topics such as investing, valuation, and management related to Dr. Deming's teachings. Since 2016, Stotz and ASIR have made much of their research free and publicly available through their initiative Become a Better Investor. In 2017, Stotz started the Valuation Master Class with an aim to help young people build great careers in finance. In 2019, more than 1,000 students from more than 30 countries had entered the Valuation Master Class.

In 2013, Stotz retired to set up ASIR. His last position was as a portfolio strategist and managing director of the International Business Department at Maybank Kim Eng Securities (Thailand).

He is a recognized public speaker and commentator on matters of investing in Thailand and Asia in general, invited and quoted by Bloomberg, US News, The Star and other regional and global news outlets."4 Stock Sectors to Watch in 2016 - Mutual Funds". U.S. News & World Report. 2015-12-03.

== Books ==
- How to Start Building Your Wealth Investing in the Stock Market
- Transform Your Business with Dr. Deming's 14 Points
- 9 Valuation Mistakes and How to Avoid Them
- My Worst Investment Ever

== SSRN publications ==
- Ten Stocks are Enough in Asia
- Eight Stocks are Enough in China
- Financial Analysts Were Only Wrong by 25%
- An Empirical Study of Financial Analysts Earnings Forecast Accuracy
