= Brownsville Road =

Street in Allegheny County, Pennsylvania

Coordinates: 40.416°N 79.986°W

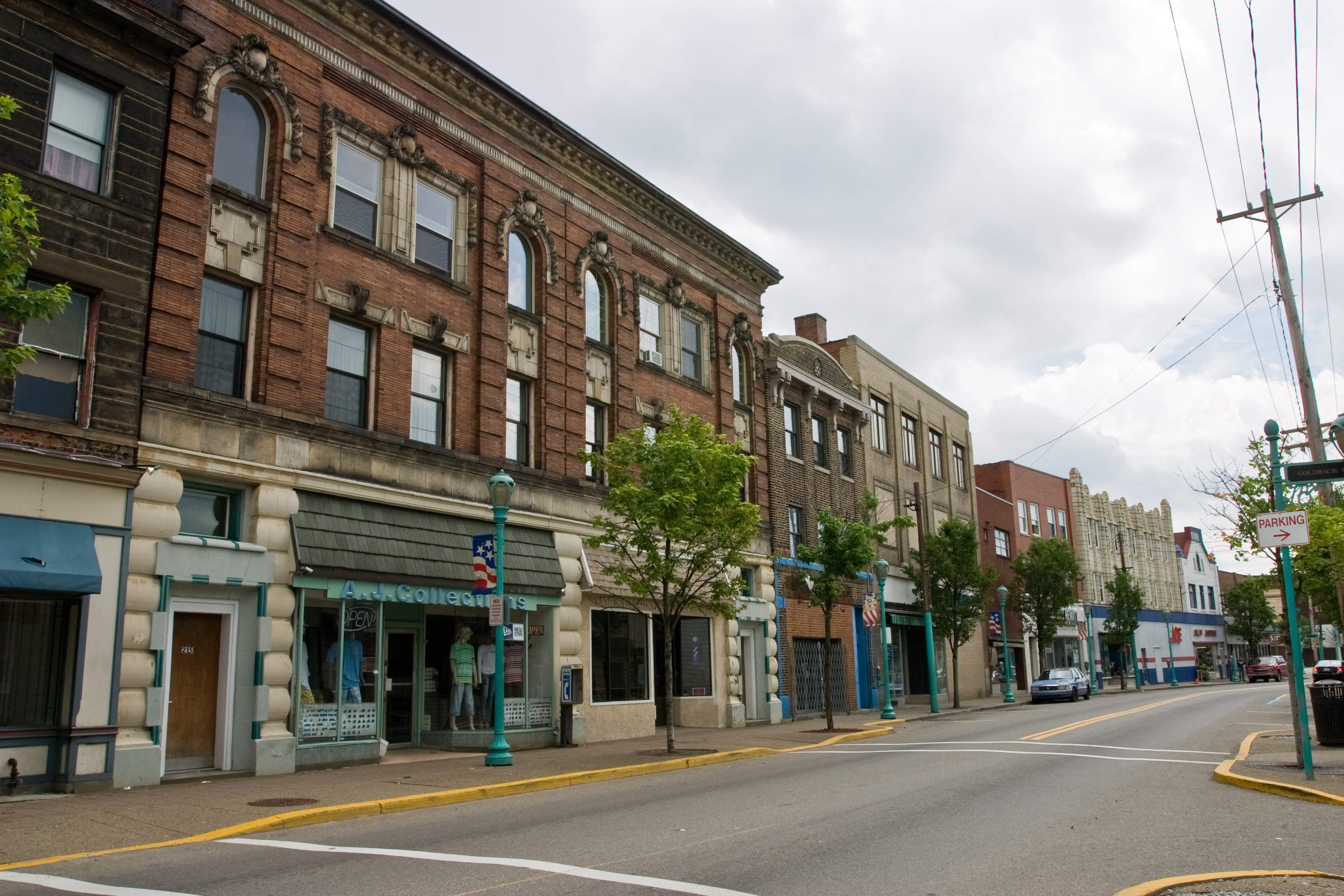
- Brownsville Road in Mount Oliver, Pennsylvania
- South end: PA 88 in South Park Township
- North end: Arlington Avenue in Pittsburgh

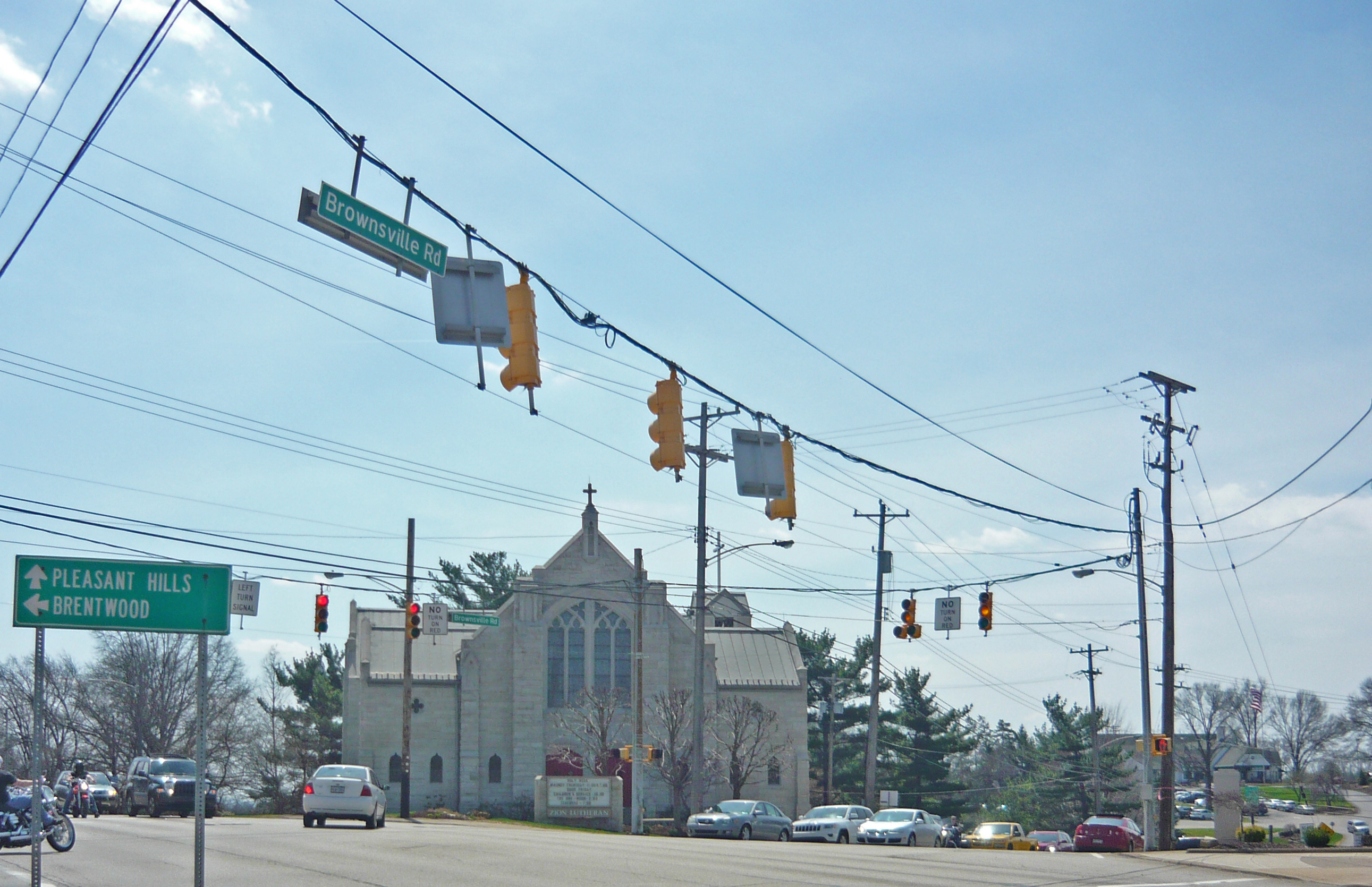
Brownsville Road and Clairton Boulevard in Brentwood in 2014

Brownsville Road is a road between Pittsburgh, at Eighteenth Street and South Avenue in Allegheny County, Pennsylvania eastwards through Mount Oliver and generally highlands situated along or near the hilltops often overlooking (and sometimes taking shorter paths cutting across the loops of the meanders of) the Monongahela River. (Note: A common feature of Amerindian Trails Hurlbert tells us in the Paths of Inland Commerce.) It has had several names over its history, and was also known at the Red Stone Road (Note: An old misconception had labeled mounds of the pre-Columbian Amerindian Mound Builder's cultures Redstone Old Forts, from their position above and near a ford (crossing) of the Monongahela River. The crossing ford coincided with a wagon navigable descent from the Cumberland Narrows water gap pass from Cumberland, Maryland and northern Virginia—a route shown to young major George Washington known now as Nemacolin's Path. Because of this site when travel required walking, Redstone Old Fort or Burd's Fort, later became renamed to Brownsville after its developer around 1800, and then grew far faster than Pittsburgh. Brownsville was 3-4 days shorter to buy a locally built riverboat and outfit it to reach Mississippi valley pioneer communities. Pittsburgh could be reached as well by the gaps of the Allegheny such as by using the Kittanning Path, but that interior-to-Pennsylvania was never promoted as were the roads from Baltimore, and the Susquehanna River, while often navigable, wasn't improved by works in the Canal Age until the late 1820s. After that, Pittsburgh linked by canal and the Allegheny Portage Railroad was just four days from America's major port and biggest city, Philadelphia—so began to grow faster than Brownsville.) and the period it was a Plank Road managed as a toll road, the Brownsville Plank Road, or the Brownsville Turnpike, or locally, as the area grew into a city, Southern Avenue.

Along its route, it would also travel through Westmoreland County and end at its start terminus in Brownsville, Fayette County, Pennsylvania. It was a heavily used emigrant trail during the post-Revolutionary War surge in expansion west over the Allegheny Ridge to settle the now safer, now open lands of the Northwest Territory (Note: One causus Belli along the frontier and by members of a certain generation was the closure of settlements over the mountains after the French and Indian War (1763), particularly after a widespread land promotion of the Ohio Country had whetted appetites for the flat farm lands that had only recently come into the awareness of most colonial Americans.) until well into the 1850s as a westward emigrant trail.

== Pre-history to the 19th century ==
The road follows the route of ancient trails and footpaths as did many Indian roads, along the highlands and connected to the road along the descent from the Cumberland Narrows mountain pass (later descended via the upland community of present-day Uniontown, Pennsylvania) to the ford Monongahela River below the bluffs known as Redstone Old Fort (Later became Brownsville with the "forks of the Ohio" (eventual site of Pittsburgh, a distance of 26 miles (42 km). It later became the road connecting Pittsburgh with Brownsville, Pennsylvania, and from there via Nemacolin's Path to Virginia and points further east and further West to a similar crossing at present-day Wheeling, West Virginia. Brownsville was attractive as a point on the Eastern Emigrant Trails where travelers could reach river boat construction on the water levels of the Mississippi watershed—or continue across Washington County on the wagon roads westward to cross the (West) Virginia pan handle to reach lower central Ohio and points west.

It was a major route for travel by stagecoach and emigrants driving Conestoga Wagons to Northern Ohio (often via Youngstown, Ohio WNW of Pittsburgh or Northwestwards for the lower side of the Great Lakes. Whatever the destination, at least one crossing of the Allegheny and Youghiogheny Rivers was needed for travelers proceeding west on northern roads.). The road was also significant during the Whiskey Rebellion, particularly its southern half; when trans-Allegheny farmers rose in armed protest to a tax on liquor sent east by pack animal on the Cumberland-Brownsville Road—shipping distilled liquor was easier than shipping the much greater volume and weight of raw grains.

Brownsville road, of the old Red Stone road, as it was generally called, was prior to 1855 a highway of considerable importance. During the 30s, the road was constantly thronged with stage coaches, carrying mail and passengers to Brownsville. Here horses were changed and passengers proceeded by stage over the old National road to Washington arid Baltimore. In fact, the road was considered at one time the most direct route from Pittsburg to the east. Conestoga wagons loaded with freight and scores of vehicles used the road to Brownsville. For thirty years the road was in constant use.

— Charles R. M'Murtie, The Pittsburgh Press (September 23, 1900) (Note: Note: The phrasing and viewpoint of this newspaper's 'interests and tourism piece' is written from the view point of Pittsburghers as a focus. Hence it pays little attention to the fact Brownsville was the bigger town until near the end of the 1850s when the Pennsylvania Railroad connected the Eastern Seaboard with the mid-west; the role Brownsville had been fulfilling.)

== 19th century ==
It was the route along which telegraph lines first entered Pittsburgh. There are relatively few roads connecting the floodplain of the Monongahela River with the higher elevations to the south and west of the river. Originally, Brownsville road connected with the floodplain by the road now known as Arlington Avenue. In 1851 a turnpike company was chartered by the State of Pennsylvania to pave the Pittsburgh end of the road, and to connect it with South Eighteenth Street. After this construction, the northern end of Brownsville Road connected to S. Eighteenth Street at the crossing of the Pittsburgh, Virginia and Charleston Railway. Many cemeteries were sited along the road as part of the Rural Cemetery Movement. In the 1880s, an "electric road" was built from Mount Oliver to the Concord Presbyterian Church, an area of Carrick also known as Crailo or Spiketown. Brownsville Road became a route out of the city for amusement and entertainment, including prize fighting.

== 20th century ==
Streetcar tracks of the Pittsburgh Railways Co. ran down the road until 1971, ending just past the border of Pittsburgh at the "Brentwood Loop". They were part of the 53 Carrick, the 53's rush-hour variant 47 Carrick via Tunnel, and the 77/54 North Side–Carrick via Bloomfield ("Flying Fraction"), streetcar runs.
