= Thomas Jefferson High School (Jefferson Hills, Pennsylvania) =

American public high school

Coordinates: 39.297129°N 6.939291°W

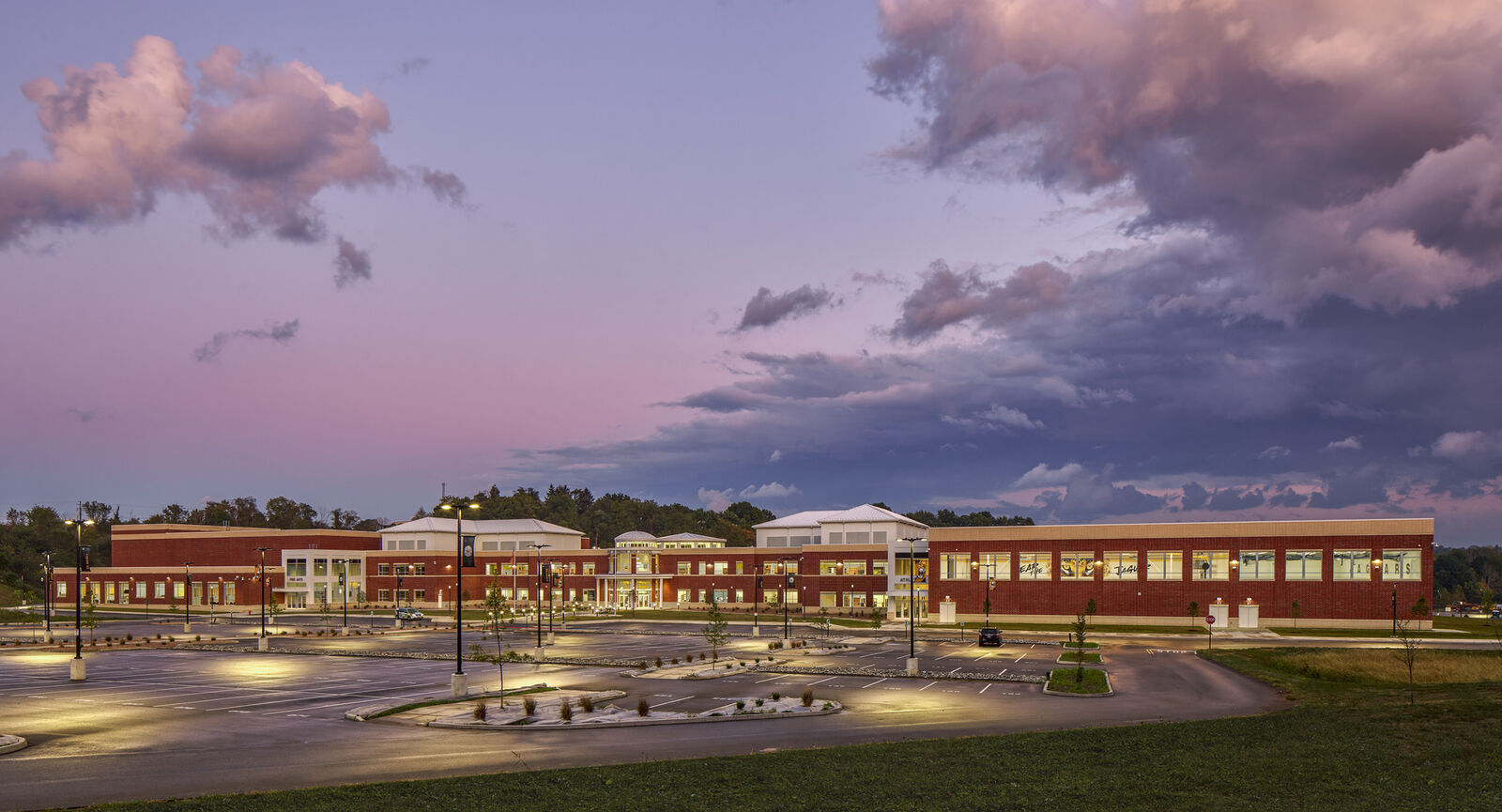
- 830 Old Clairton Rd, Jefferson Hills, PA 15025; United States

Information
- Type: Public
- Motto: We are TJ
- Established: Junior High: 1953; Additions Complete: September 3rd, 1957; First Graduating Class: 1960
- School district: West Jefferson Hills School District
- Principal: Pete Murphy
- Principal: Dr. Adam Knaresborough
- Principal: Allison Waldo
- Grades: 9–12
- Enrollment: 1069 (2024-2025)
- Color
- Mascot: Jaguar
- Yearbook: Monticello
- Website: Thomas Jefferson High School

Thomas Jefferson High School is an American public secondary school that is located in Jefferson Hills, Pennsylvania. It is part of the West Jefferson Hills School District which includes West Elizabeth, Jefferson Hills, and Pleasant Hills. These communities have a combined population of 15,000.

== History ==
Before additions, Thomas Jefferson Junior High was dedicated during an opening ceremony that was officiated bt Superintendent Alfred W. Beattie. Architect Joseph Hoover designed the building. It then became a high school in 1957 with the additions of an auditorium, gymnasium, and thirty-seven new classrooms. During this time, students in grades eight through twelve were educated inside this building; this changed when a new middle school was built in 1965.

The high school building subsequently underwent multiple renovations, including an addition in 1990 and a new stadium in 2000.

In 2015, school district officials authorized the design of a new building; the new facility was slated to be a red brick building modeled in the style of Monticello. Construction costs were initially estimated at $100 million. It opened in 2019.

A mural with a large portrait of Thomas Jefferson was commissioned by TJ Arts for the building's atrium. It was created by Dennis Stocke, a local artist and art teacher at Boyce Middle School in the Upper St. Clair School District.

As of 2024, the original high school building has been demolished and in its place is more parking for the stadium.

== Extracurricular activities ==
The high school offers a variety of clubs and activities. The Thomas Jefferson American football team won the WPIAL Class AAA Championships in 1980 at Pitt Stadium, in 2004, 2006, 2007, 2008, 2015, 2016, 2017, 2019, and 2020 at Heinz Field and Class AAAA Champions in 2024 at Norwin High School. In addition, in 2004, 2007, 2008, 2019, and 2020 the team won the PIAA State Championship in Hershey.

The school newspaper is called the Statesman. The yearbook is titled the Monticello and the literary magazine is named the Spectrum and features fictional submissions written and submitted by actual students and teachers.

"The Pride of Jefferson Hills, Pleasant Hills, and West Elizabeth", The Thomas Jefferson band consists of approximately 150 members from Band, Color guard and Majorettes. Formerly directed by James Mirabella of Steubenville, Ohio, and is now to be directed by Sarah Dawson. The band is a staple of Football Halftime Shows and Band Festivals in the Pittsburgh area. The band was featured as the WPXI Band of the week in 1998 and at the half time show of the Pittsburgh Steelers and Baltimore Ravens AFC divisional playoff in 2011. The band also goes on a Disney trip every other year.

The theater program has also won Gene Kelly Awards in 2022, 2023 and 2024.

== Notable alumni ==
- Rich Costanzo, former professional soccer player, Pittsburgh Riverhounds
- David Dausey, epidemiologist, professor, academic administrator, 14th president of Duquesne University
- Dom DeCicco, former professional football player, Chicago Bears, Minnesota Vikings, and Tampa Bay Buccaneers
- Mark Deklin, actor and fight coordinator
- Robert F. Frazier, attorney and former Pennsylvania legislator
- Baptiste "Bap" Manzini, former professional football player, Detroit Lions and Philadelphia Eagles
- Katie May, model, social media personality, and businesswoman
- Lucas Nix, former professional football player, Oakland Raiders
- Birgir Mikaelsson, former professional basketball player from Iceland
- Tyler Reed, former professional football player, Chicago Bears
- Guy Reschenthaler, U.S. Congressman
- Chase Winovich, professional football player, Houston Texans
- John Zeiler, former professional ice hockey player, Los Angeles Kings

== Gallery ==
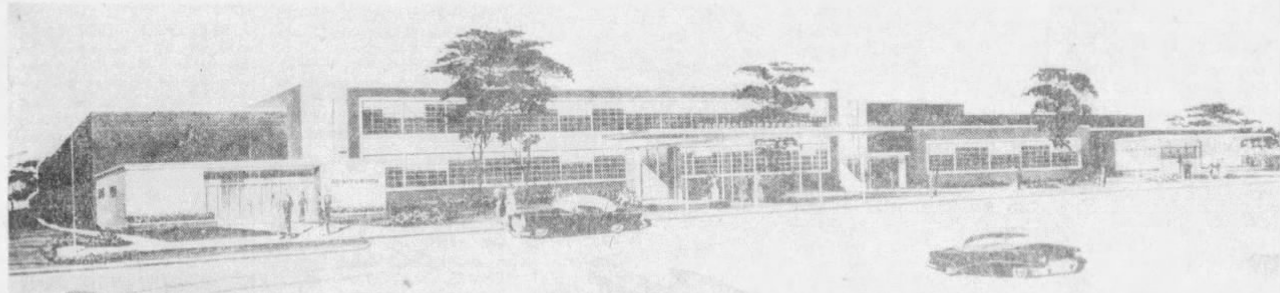
March 20, 1956 - Thomas Jefferson High School Addition

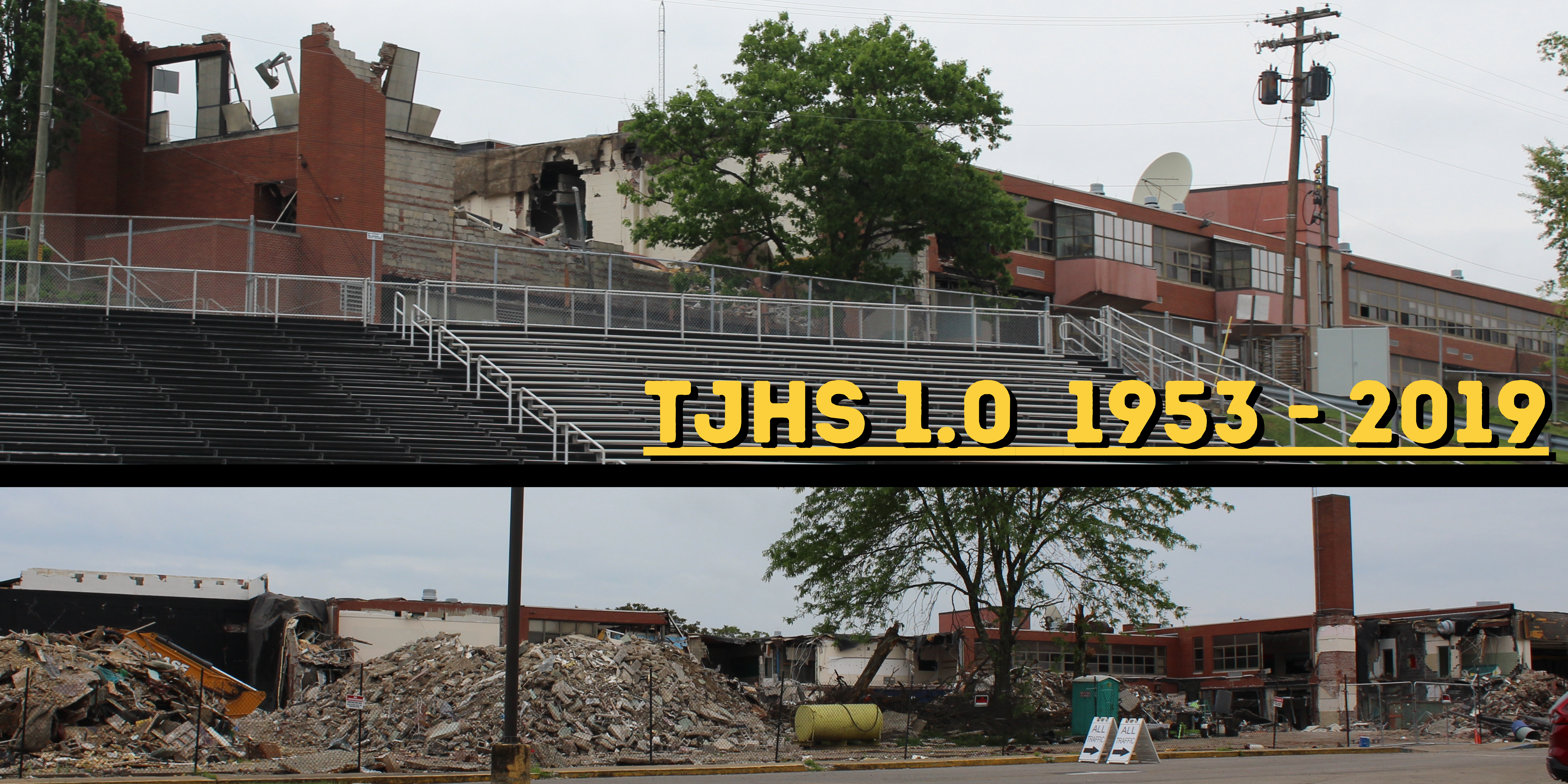
TJHS 1.0
