= Lucas Nix =

American football player (born 1989)

No. 76
- Position: Offensive guard

Personal information
- Born: September 28, 1989 (age 37); Jefferson Hills, Pennsylvania, U.S.
- Listed height: 6 ft 5 in (1.96 m)
- Listed weight: 303 lb (137 kg)

Career information
- High school: Jefferson (Jefferson Hills)
- College: Pittsburgh
- NFL draft: 2012: undrafted

Career history
- Oakland Raiders (2012–2013); Chicago Bears (2015)*
- * Offseason or practice squad member only

Career NFL statistics
- Games played: 15
- Games started: 10
- Stats at Pro Football Reference

Lucas Edward Nix (born September 28, 1989) is an American former professional football player who was an offensive guard for the Oakland Raiders of the National Football League (NFL). He played college football for the Pittsburgh Panthers.

== Professional career ==
Pre-draft measurables
Height	Weight	Arm length	Hand span	40-yard dash	20-yard shuttle	Three-cone drill	Vertical jump
6 ft 5 in (1.96 m)	317 lb (144 kg)	33 1/2 in (0.85 m)	9 3/4 in (0.25 m)	5.43 s	4.90 s	7.81 s	29.5 in (0.75 m)
All values from NFL Combine

=== Oakland Raiders ===
He was signed by Oakland Raiders as undrafted free agent on May 4, 2012. The Raiders waived Nix on August 26, 2014.

=== Chicago Bears ===
On August 24, 2015, Nix signed a one-year contract with the Chicago Bears. On September 1, 2015, he was waived by the Bears.
