= Elizabeth Bridge =

Elizabeth Bridge could refer to:

- Elisabeth Bridge (Budapest), a crossing of the Danube in Hungary
- Regis R. Malady Bridge, a crossing of the Monongahela in the United States
- Elizabeth Stirling Bridge (1819–1895), British musician
