= Robb Austin =

American politician and political consultant

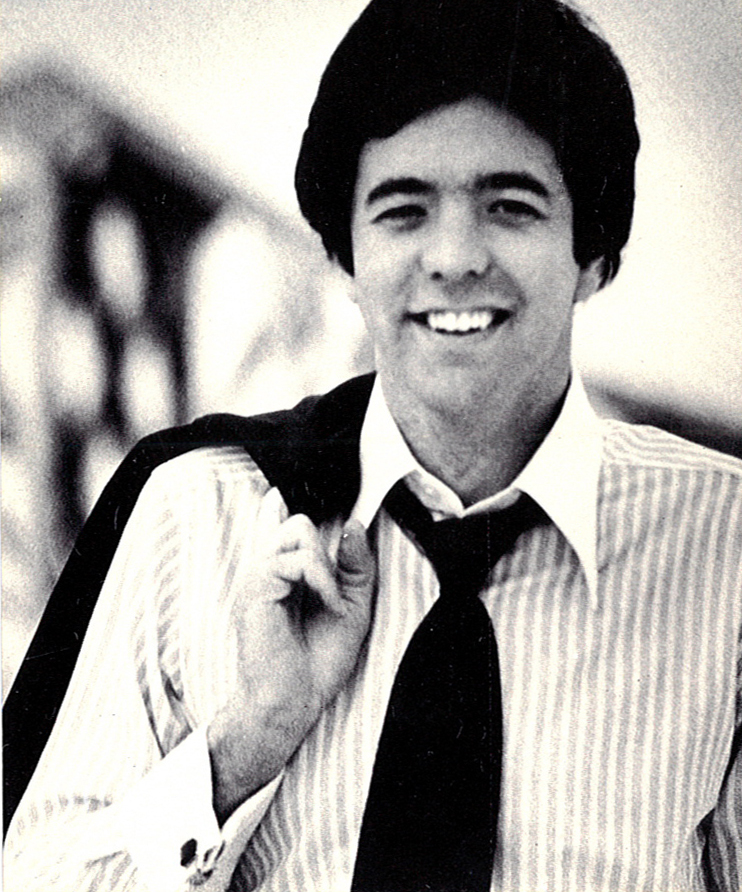
- Austin in 1978

Member of the Pennsylvania House of Representatives from the 39th district
- In office January 2, 1979 – December 31, 1980
- Preceded by: George Miscevich
- Succeeded by: David K. Levdansky

Personal details
- Born: December 22, 1952 (age 73) Cleveland, Ohio, U.S.
- Education: George Washington University

Robb Austin is an American politician and political consultant. He served as a member of the Pennsylvania House of Representatives. He is now a political and media affairs consultant in the United States. He is a former newspaper reporter for The McKeesport Daily News in Pennsylvania, and now works as a media affairs consultant.

== Early life and education ==
Austin was born December 22, 1950, in Cleveland. He graduated from George Washington University in Washington D.C.

== Career ==
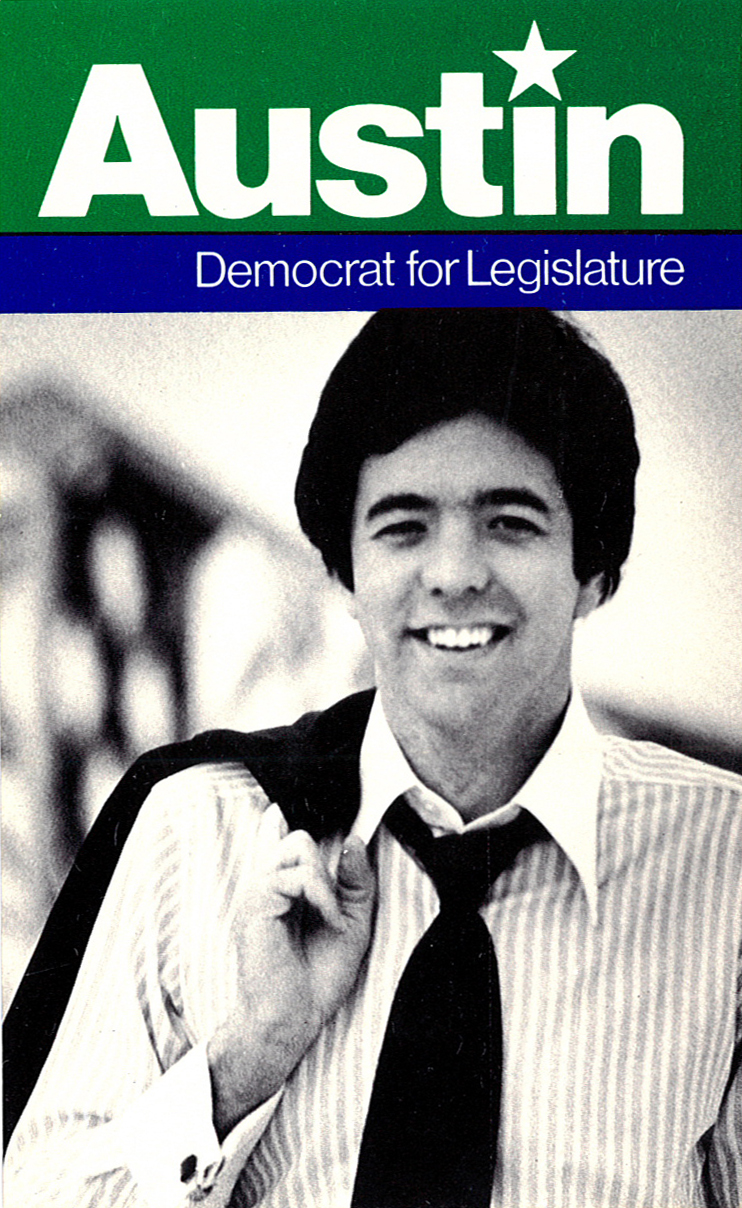
Austin's Pennsylvania House of Representatives campaign photo in 1978

Austin was a member of the Pennsylvania House of Representatives. In 1978, at the age of 26, he defeated a three-term incumbent in the 39th Legislative District primary election by over a 2–1 margin. Austin received 5,116 votes to Democratic incumbent George Miscevich's 2,428. Austin went on to win the November 1978 general election with 12,055 votes to his Republican opponent's 3,196, in one of the largest pluralities in state legislative races that year. The Austin campaign emphasized door-to-door campaigning, local volunteers, and creative media advertising. Austin was an effective campaigner and burst onto the Pittsburgh political scene quickly. He was the first full-time legislator in the 39th District and the first to open and staff a legislative office in the Mon Valley district.

Prior to being elected to the state legislature, Austin had been a newspaper reporter for The McKeesport Daily News for five years. His election to the House of Representatives was Austin's first run for public office.

On March 28, 1979, Austin was one of a small group of freshman Democratic legislators who were invited to a budget breakfast briefing with Pennsylvania Governor Dick Thornburgh at the Governor's Mansion. During the breakfast, Governor Thornburgh was first notified about the nuclear power plant accident at Three Mile Island.

As a legislator, Austin spoke out against an early attempt to increase legislators' salaries and later was one of only two legislators (193–2) to vote against increasing legislators' travel allowance from 15 to 17 cents per mile. He sponsored legislation for strict reporting requirements for lobbyists; criticized the leadership of his own party for the hiring practices of former legislators; and provided Governor Thornburgh with the deciding vote which defined the authority of the state's first elected Attorney General over the objections of the leadership in his party.

Austin sponsored a resolution adopted by the House to include the treatment of sickle cell anemia in the state Health Plan of 1979, and authored a provision to the state's No Fault Divorce law which mandated that a spouse's pension be taken into account when the courts are determining property distribution. For his work on sickle cell anemia Austin was recognized by the Clairton Branch of the NAACP as its 1979 "Person of the Year."

=== Pennsylvania State Senate election ===
Austin was headed for re-election to the State House in 1980 but chose instead to run for the State Senate against an 18-year incumbent Edward Zemprelli, who was also the State Senate Majority Leader. Austin charged that Zemprelli had been in office too long and had not done enough for the district. His critics said Austin had only served one-term in the State House and should wait before trying to go too far too fast politically.

Austin ran a campaign based on new ideas and change while Zemprelli relied on his experience as Majority Leader and the fact that he was "the most powerful voice in Harrisburg." In a hard-fought, high-profile campaign, Zemprelli's experience argument won out and Austin lost by a vote total of 27,960 to 18,019. The Pittsburgh Press wrote that Austin "ran a smart, high-stakes campaign that combined elements of populism and big money. It won the admiration of many political observers, who gave Austin an outside shot at an upset victory. Austin made campaign history by buying television time to promote his local race, but he also entered living rooms in a more conventional – and arduous way – going from door-to-door until, he said, he had visited 60 percent of the homes in the district."

The campaign wrap-up concluded, "His loss to Zemprelli means he will leave public office in December when his House term expires. Austin decided not to run for House re-election in order to devote full time to his Senate race."

=== Washington career ===
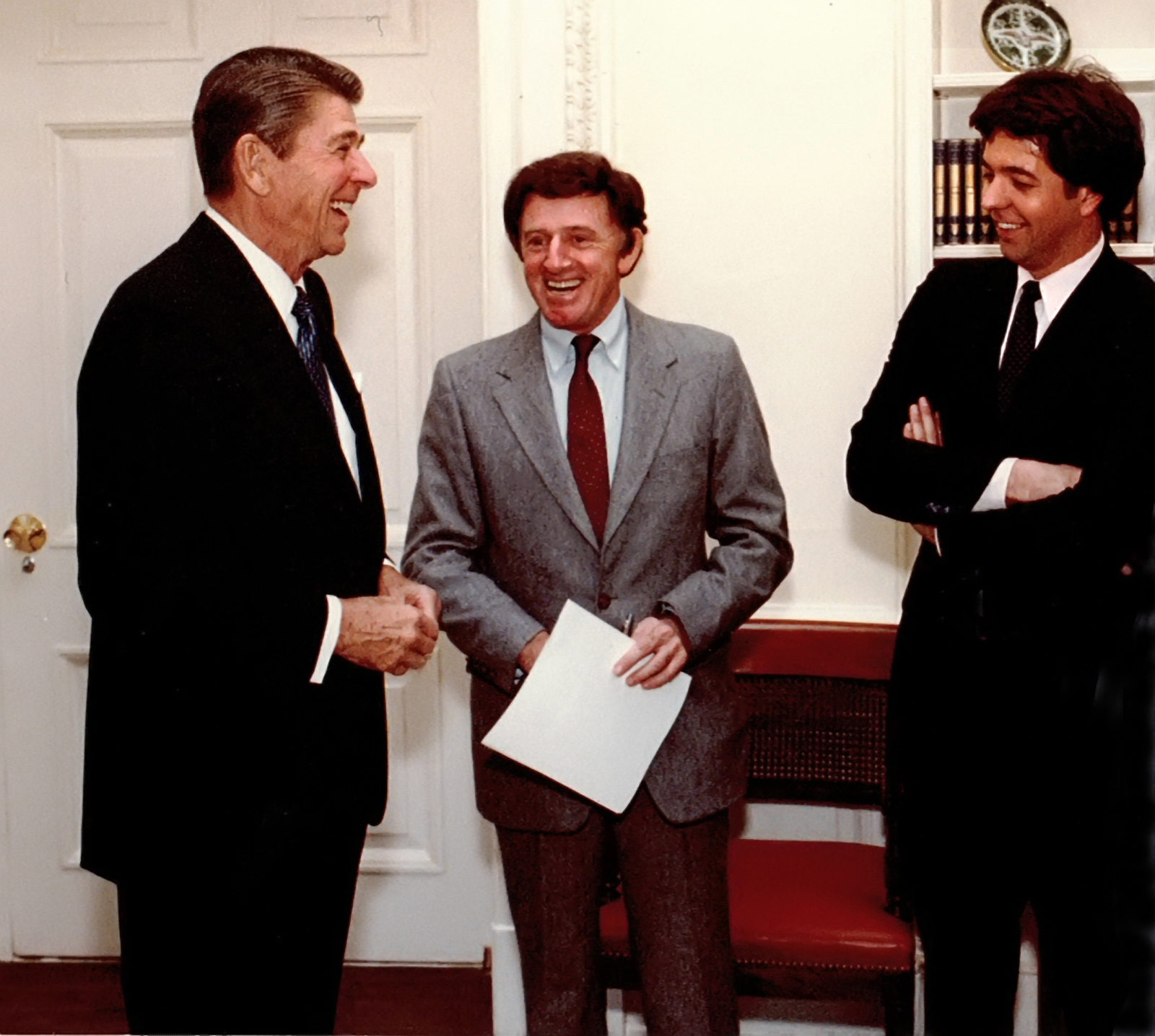
President Reagan, Congressman Eugene Atkinson, and Austin in the Oval Office in October 1981

When his term expired, Austin went to Washington where he became Chief of Staff to Congressman Eugene Atkinson (D-Pa.). In an effort to realign Congress, the Reagan White House undertook an effort to encourage conservative Democrats to switch parties. In October 1981, with President Reagan at his side, Atkinson became the first conservative Democrat to switch to the Republican Party in a Rose Garden ceremony at The White House. Austin became a Republican at that time also.

Austin was said to have played a pivotal role in the Atkinson switch and there was some speculation that Austin's connections to The White House might propel him in a future run for Congress. The Pittsburgh Press wrote, "Somehow, all of the television network commentators, the syndicated political columnists and the Capitol Hill pundits who rushed to analyze, dissect and expatiate upon the Atkinson political drama neglected to point out the McKeesport connection. He is Robb Austin, the man many people here think was the eminence grise behind Atkinson's defection. Austin is now Atkinson's top administrative aide, but back along the banks of the Monongahela he will be remembered as a former state legislator who was young, attractive, ambitious – and who nonetheless served only one term."

The report continues, "When Atkinson and President Reagan held a joint news conference in the Rose Garden to celebrate the congressman's new-found Republicanism, the former legislator from McKeesport figured prominently in the background tableau. He looked on from the Portico of the Oval Office, flanked on either side by Reagan political advisors Ed Rollins and Paul Russo. Austin got to know them when he was negotiating the terms of Atkinson’s political defection. Austin met Ronald Reagan and three other famous Reagan confidantes: Michael Deaver, James Baker and Lyn Nofziger. Reagan posed for a picture with Austin and Nofzinger gave him a cigar."

=== Work with Lee Atwater ===
Reagan political adviser Lee Atwater befriended Austin during the switch process, and Austin soon became a frequent visitor to Atwater's office in the White House. Atwater introduced Austin to Reagan and included him in White House social functions and high level events, including the October 8, 1981, South Lawn departure ceremony of former Presidents Richard Nixon, Gerald Ford, and Jimmy Carter, who led the U.S. delegation to the state funeral of former Egyptian President Anwar Sadat. Atwater later dispatched Austin to consult on various congressional campaigns.

Atkinson lost in the 1982 mid-term elections in what was a Democratic landslide that year. The Reagan administration appointed Austin Director of Governmental Affairs, Food and Nutrition Service, at the U.S. Department of Agriculture. Two years later Lee Atwater was instrumental in sending Austin to Atlanta with less than eight weeks until the election to manage the long shot campaign of Republican Patrick L. Swindall against five-term incumbent and former Rhodes Scholar, Congressman Elliott Levitas (D-Ga). An August survey by pollster Arthur Finkelstein showed Levitas held a large lead over Swindall 52.5% to 24.4% prior to Austin's arrival to the campaign.

While Atwater later orchestrated the 1988 presidential election of President George H. W. Bush, and became Chairman of the Republican National Committee, he recognized the fact that the Atkinson party switch was one of his first coups as Reagan's White House political advisers. They remained close friends right up to Atwater's death from a brain tumor on March 29, 1991. As RNC Chairman, Atwater called Austin "one of my oldest and dearest political pals."

=== Swindall campaign ===
The Political Report of the Free Congress Foundation reported, "September turned out to be a crucial month for the (Swindall) campaign since an experienced manager, Robb Austin, was hired. Austin shook up the organization and the campaign embarked on a strategy designed to 'smoke out' Levitas by presenting him as a big spender and too liberal for the district." Austin developed an attack-oriented strategy and began tying Levitas' liberal votes to those of New York Democratic Congresswoman Geraldine Ferraro (vice presidential running mate of Walter Mondale). Austin produced and created the campaign's newspaper and radio advertising, with media consultant Roger Ailes producing the campaign's television spots.

One Austin-created ad featured the Brooklyn Bridge in the background, along with a picture of Levitas under the heading, "Elliott Levitas: The Best Congressman Queens, New York, has ever had."

Another Austin newspaper ad attacked Levitas for taking 19 foreign trips at the taxpayers' expense. These trips were listed in an ad amid a backdrop of Levitas' picture, a snow-covered mountain labeled "somewhere in Europe", and a jet flying high in the sky. The ad reads, "Elliott Levitas. Our man in Washington. And France. And Switzerland. And Belgium. And England. And Spain. And Austria. And Luxemburg. And Iceland. And Finland. And The Netherlands. And Norway. And Portugal. And Germany. And Hungary. And... the list goes on."

Swindall won the election with 53% of the vote in what was a major upset victory for the National Republican Congressional Committee (NRCC) in the 1984 elections. Levitas however blamed his defeat on "the lies and distortions and hooliganism of my opponent's campaign."

In a post-election book Oustings the Ins by the Institute for Government and Politics, Stuart Rothenberg wrote, "{Austin} admitted that his plan was to 'gut' incumbent Levitas to 1) get media coverage and increase the saliency of the race and 2) shake up Levitas in the hope of forcing him to confront Swindall and possibly make a mistake. Had Swindall kept his gloves on and run what many would have called a "proper" and "positive" campaign, Levitas almost certainly would have been re-elected – and re-elected by a substantial margin."

Conservative weekly Human Events said Swindall's election was "one of the genuine Cinderella stories of 1984" and called Austin "campaign manager par excellence, a former Democratic state legislator whose specialty is wooing conservative Democrats to the GOP fold." On the night of Swindall's election, he named Austin as his new Chief of Staff in Washington.

Austin organized and hired Swindall's new staff but resigned in June 1985 to start his own political and media affairs consulting practice. He teamed up with Ronald Reagan's former media adviser, Elliott Curson, on various advertising projects. His client list included dozens of members of Congress, trade associations, and companies. He consults for various entities and corporations, mostly in media affairs.
