= Pennsylvania House of Representatives, District 39 =

American legislative district

Pennsylvania's 39th State House of Representatives district
Representative
Andrew Kuzma; R–Elizabeth
- Population (2022): 65,835

The 39th Pennsylvania House of Representatives District is located in southwestern Pennsylvania and has been represented since 2023 by Andrew Kuzma.

== District profile ==
The 39th Pennsylvania House of Representatives District is located in Allegheny County and Washington County, including the following areas:

Allegheny County

- Elizabeth
- Elizabeth Township
- Forward Township
- Jefferson Hills
- Pleasant Hills
- South Park Township
- West Elizabeth

Washington County

- Carroll Township (part)
  - District 01
  - District 02
- Finleyville
- Monongahela
- New Eagle
- Union Township

== Representatives ==
Representative	Party	Years	District home	Note
Prior to 1969, seats were apportioned by county.
Regis R. Malady	Democrat	1969 – 1974		
George Miscevich	Democrat	1975 – 1978		
Robb Austin	Democrat	1979 – 1980		
George Miscevich	Democrat	1981 – 1984		
David K. Levdansky	Democrat	1985 – 2010	Elizabeth	
Rick Saccone	Republican	2011 – 2019		
Mike Puskaric	Republican	2019 – 2023		Lost renomination
Andrew Kuzma	Republican	2023 – present		

== Recent election results ==
PA House election, 2024: Pennsylvania House, District 39
Party	Candidate	Votes	%
Republican	Andrew Kuzma (incumbent)	23,808	62.07
Democratic	Angela Girol	14,546	37.93
Total votes		38,354	100.00
Republican hold			

PA House election, 2022: Pennsylvania House, District 39
Party	Candidate	Votes	%
Republican	Andrew Kuzma	18,102	59.14
Democratic	Rick Self	12,508	40.86
Total votes		30,610	100.00
Republican hold			

PA House election, 2020: Pennsylvania House, District 39
Party	Candidate	Votes	%
Republican	Mike Puskaric (incumbent)	23,093	62.82
Democratic	Sara-Summer Oliphant	13,669	37.18
Total votes		36,762	100.00
Republican hold			

PA House election, 2018: Pennsylvania House, District 39
Party	Candidate	Votes	%
Republican	Mike Puskaric	14,870	55.80
Democratic	Rob Rhoderick	11,778	44.20
Total votes		26,648	100.00
Republican hold			

PA House election, 2016: Pennsylvania House, District 39
Party	Candidate	Votes	%
Republican	Rick Saccone (incumbent)	22,034	68.40
Democratic	Pete Kobylinski	10,180	31.60
Total votes		32,214	100.00
Republican hold			

PA House election, 2014: Pennsylvania House, District 39
Party	Candidate	Votes	%
Republican	Rick Saccone (incumbent)	11,805	60.35
Democratic	Lisa Stout-Bashioum	7,755	39.65
Total votes		19,560	100.00
Republican hold			

PA House election, 2012: Pennsylvania House, District 39
Party	Candidate	Votes	%
Republican	Rick Saccone (incumbent)	14,495	50.19
Democratic	Dave Levdansky	14,383	49.81
Total votes		28,878	100.00
Republican hold			

PA House election, 2010: Pennsylvania House, District 39
Party	Candidate	Votes	%
Republican	Rick Saccone	10,761	50.35
Democratic	Dave Levdansky (incumbent)	10,610	49.65
Total votes		21,371	100.00
Republican gain from Democratic			
