= Tyler Reed (American football) =

American football player (born 1982)

No. 64
- Position: Guard

Personal information
- Born: October 6, 1982 (age 44); Jefferson Hills, Pennsylvania, U.S.
- Listed height: 6 ft 5 in (1.96 m)
- Listed weight: 305 lb (138 kg)

Career information
- High school: Jefferson (Jefferson Hills)
- College: Penn State
- NFL draft: 2006: 6th round, 200th overall pick

Career history
- Chicago Bears (2006–2009)

Tyler Blake Reed (born October 6, 1982) is an American former football guard. He was selected by the Chicago Bears in the sixth round of the 2006 NFL draft. He played college football at Penn State.

== Early life ==
Reed played on both sides of the ball and started 4 years while attending Thomas Jefferson High School in Jefferson Hills, Pennsylvania. He recorded over 150 pancake blocks and 250 tackles, 23 of which were sacks during his high school career. Reed also won the WPIAL Class AAA shot put championship in 2000.

== College career ==
Collegiately, Reed started 30 games at right guard while at Penn State. Reed started 11 games on the offensive line as a senior, playing a key role on the Nittany Lions team then finished the season as the number three ranked college football team in the nation.

The 2005 Penn State football season culminated in the 2006 Orange Bowl in Miami, Florida. A post-game photograph from that game captured Reed extending a hand to a defeated FSU player Brodrick Bunkley after the third overtime.

== Professional career ==
Reed signed a four-year contract with the Chicago Bears in June 2006. He was waived by the Chicago Bears on September 2, 2006, and signed to the practice squad on September 3, 2006. He signed a two-year contract with the Chicago Bears on February 2, 2007.

The Bears released Reed from the practice squad on October 6, 2008, only to re-sign him eight days later. Following the season, he was re-signed to a future contract on December 29, 2008. He was waived/injured on August 25 and subsequently reverted to injured reserve.

Reed was waived by the Bears on March 1, 2010.
