= John Zeiler =

American ice hockey player

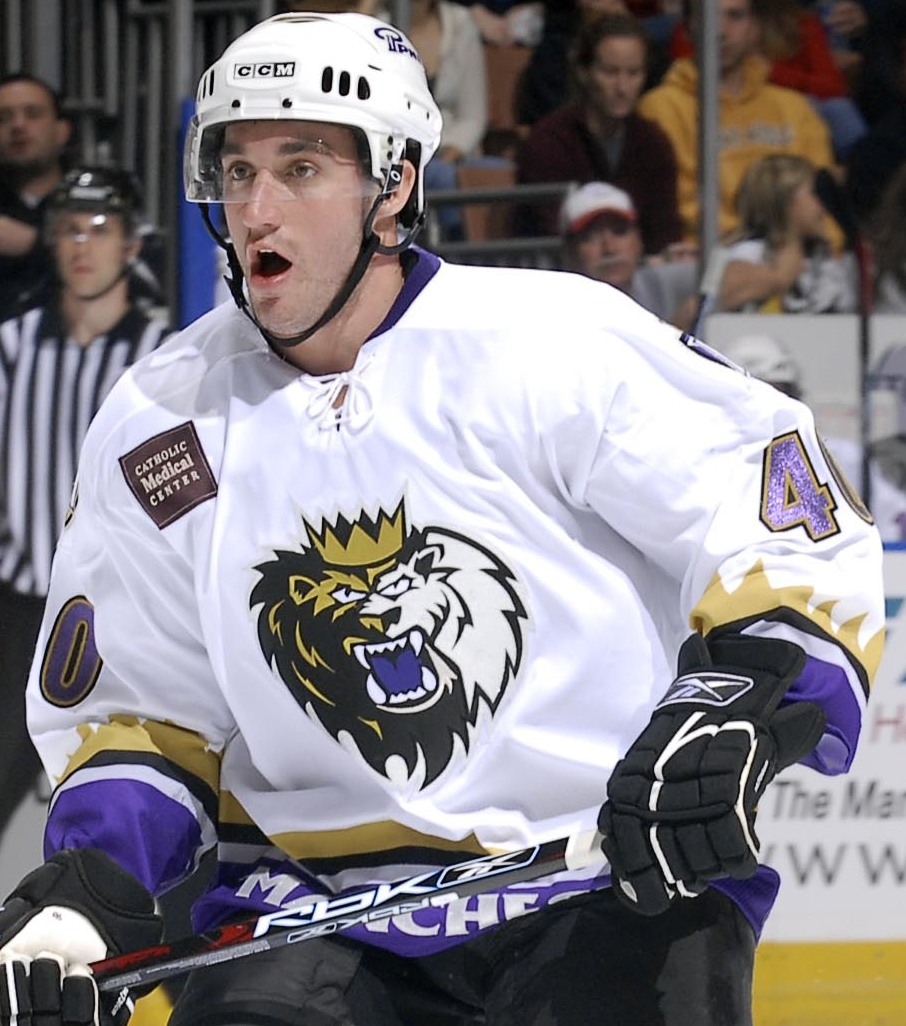
- Zeiler with the Manchester Monarchs in 2006
- Born: November 21, 1982 (age 43) Jefferson Hills, Pennsylvania, U.S.
- Height: 6 ft 0 in (183 cm)
- Weight: 196 lb (89 kg; 14 st 0 lb)
- Position: Right wing
- Shot: Right
- Played for: Los Angeles Kings; Augsburger Panther
- NHL draft: 132nd overall, 2002; Phoenix Coyotes
- Playing career: 2006–2015

John Zeiler (born November 21, 1982) is an American former professional ice hockey right winger. He last played for the EC Kassel Huskies of the DEL2. Zeiler was drafted 132nd overall by the Phoenix Coyotes in the 2002 NHL entry draft.

== Playing career ==
Zeiler graduated from Thomas Jefferson High School in Jefferson Hills, Pennsylvania. His junior training was with Sioux City of the USHL and with the Pittsburgh Hornets AAA program. Prior to the NHL, he played college hockey at St. Lawrence.

In 2007, Zeiler signed a one-year contract with the Kings and made his NHL debut on February 17, 2007 against the Anaheim Ducks. Five days later, he scored his first NHL goal against the Vancouver Canucks.

After five seasons within the Kings organization, Zeiler left to sign abroad in the German DEL, with Augsburger Panther on August 9, 2011.

== Personal information ==
Zeiler was cast as an extra in Tooth Fairy, a 2010 film starring Dwayne Johnson.

== Career statistics ==
			Regular season					Playoffs
Season	Team	League	GP	G	A	Pts	PIM	GP	G	A	Pts	PIM
1997–98	Thomas Jefferson High School	HSPA
1998–99	Thomas Jefferson High School	HSPA	22	48	45	93		—	—	—	—	—
1999–2000	Pittsburgh Hornets AAA	18U AAA	27	17	15	32	94	—	—	—	—	—
1999–2000	Thomas Jefferson High School	HSPA	21	36	22	58		—	—	—	—	—
2000–01	Sioux City Musketeers	USHL	56	8	20	28	45	2	0	0	0	26
2001–02	Sioux City Musketeers	USHL	60	23	27	50	116	12	2	3	5	25
2002–03	St. Lawrence University	ECAC	37	10	17	27	28	—	—	—	—	—
2003–04	St. Lawrence University	ECAC	41	8	28	36	42	—	—	—	—	—
2004–05	St. Lawrence University	ECAC	38	9	23	32	42	—	—	—	—	—
2005–06	St. Lawrence University	ECAC	28	13	15	28	28	—	—	—	—	—
2005–06	San Antonio Rampage	AHL	8	0	1	1	10	—	—	—	—	—
2005–06	Lubbock Cotton Kings	CHL	4	2	0	2	16	—	—	—	—	—
2006–07	Manchester Monarchs	AHL	56	12	16	28	70	16	3	2	5	14
2006–07	Los Angeles Kings	NHL	23	1	2	3	22	—	—	—	—	—
2007–08	Los Angeles Kings	NHL	36	0	1	1	23	—	—	—	—	—
2007–08	Manchester Monarchs	AHL	45	6	6	12	40	4	0	2	2	8
2008–09	Los Angeles Kings	NHL	27	0	1	1	42	—	—	—	—	—
2008–09	Manchester Monarchs	AHL	2	0	1	1	4	—	—	—	—	—
2009–10	Manchester Monarchs	AHL	65	11	9	20	31	16	4	3	7	4
2010–11	Manchester Monarchs	AHL	69	9	19	28	86	5	1	1	2	4
2010–11	Los Angeles Kings	NHL	4	0	0	0	0	—	—	—	—	—
2011–12	Augsburger Panther	DEL	52	7	21	28	58	2	0	0	0	4
2012–13	Augsburger Panther	DEL	52	8	15	23	89	2	0	1	1	2
2013–14	Augsburger Panther	DEL	43	2	4	6	36	—	—	—	—	—
2014–15	EC Kassel Huskies	DEL2	46	11	28	39	71	5	0	2	2	6
AHL totals			245	38	51	89	241	41	8	8	16	30
NHL totals			90	1	4	5	87	—	—	—	—	—
DEL totals			147	17	40	57	183	4	0	1	1	6

== Awards and honors ==
Award	Year
All-ECAC Hockey Rookie Team	2002–03
