= Katie May =

American model (1981–2016)

- Born: Katie Beth May; March 16, 1981; Pittsburgh, Pennsylvania, U.S.
- Died: February 4, 2016 (aged 34); Los Angeles, California, U.S.
- Occupation: Model
- Years active: 2005–2016
- Children: 1

Katie Beth May (March 16, 1981 – February 4, 2016) was an American model and businesswoman. Dubbed "The Queen of Snapchat", May was known as a social media star and brand ambassador before her death from a chiropractically induced stroke at age 34.

== Early life and education ==
May was born in Pittsburgh, Pennsylvania, to Janet and Joseph May, both teachers. She was the youngest of four, with two sisters and a brother. May described her upbringing as "very traditional working-American", with a "real emphasis in my house on education, primarily the arts and history". She grew up in suburban Pleasant Hills, Pennsylvania and attended Thomas Jefferson High School in Jefferson Hills, where she was a cheerleader.

From 1999 to 2003, May attended Ohio University, where she earned a Bachelor of Science degree in retail merchandising.

== Career ==
In 2003, May, who had "dreams and wishes ... far from Pittsburgh" moved to Los Angeles. She worked in public relations at Dolce & Gabbana prior to launching high-end denim line SINR Denim with boyfriend Alex Maimon. May then "broke out on her own", co-founding May-Levy PR and Marketing, which operated from 2008 to 2012. Subsequently, she served as vice president of strategic marketing at Gen Arts, an arts incubator based in Los Angeles. Per May, "Then that company was sold and I was unemployed without a penny to my name."

In 2014, a photo shoot featuring May caught the attention of online magazine Arsenic; subsequent shoots published by the magazine went viral. Less than two years later, May, at the age of 34, had amassed nearly two million Instagram followers and had been named "The Queen of Snapchat". In addition, May had modeled for such mainstream publications as Sports Illustrated, GQ, and Playboy, and had acted as model for sports betting company JetBet, with which she partnered. Said May, "I am letting my fans see the sexy campaign and billboards while at the same time letting them know that I'm an active and vocal part of the company."

== Personal life ==
May was a single mother. She cited her daughter as her source of motivation: "I had the most important person in my world, my daughter, to make proud each day and to remind me what I was working towards. Failure was not an option, not putting her in the best school was not an option, not living the lifestyle that I had dreamed of for us was not an option," she told Huffington Post in 2016.

== Death ==
May tweeted on January 29, 2016, that she had pinched a nerve in her neck on a photoshoot and "got adjusted" at a chiropractor. She tweeted on January 31, 2016, that she was "going back to the chiropractor tomorrow." On the evening of February 1, 2016, May "had begun feeling numbness in a hand and dizzy", and "called her parents to tell them she thought she was going to pass out." At her family's urging, May went to Cedars Sinai Hospital; she was found to be suffering a "massive stroke." According to her father, May "was not conscious when we got to finally see her the next day. We never got to talk to her again." Life support was withdrawn on February 4, 2016.

A coroner's report confirmed that the stroke was the result of the chiropractor's neck adjustment, which tore her left vertebral artery. The coroner's office ruled it an accident. In 2017, a lawsuit, which included claims of wrongful death and professional negligence, was filed against the chiropractor by May's father in Los Angeles Superior Court. The case was settled in January 2022 for $250,000 without acknowledgement of any wrongdoing.
