= Mike Puskaric =

American politician

Member of the Pennsylvania House of Representatives from the 39th district
- In office January 1, 2019 – November 30, 2022
- Preceded by: Rick Saccone
- Succeeded by: Andrew Kuzma

Personal details
- Born: May 8, 1989 (age 37) Allegheny County, Pennsylvania, U.S.
- Party: Republican
- Education: Seton Hill University (BA)

Michael J. Puskaric (born May 8, 1989) is an American politician who represented the 39th District in the Pennsylvania House of Representatives from 2019 to 2022.

== Early life ==
Puskaric was born on May 8, 1989, in Allegheny County, Pennsylvania. He was a 2007 graduate of Serra Catholic High School in McKeesport, Pennsylvania, where he was also a football fullback and linesman. He graduated from Seton Hill University in Greensburg, Pennsylvania, in 2012, where he obtained a Bachelor of Arts degree in Communications.

== Political career ==
In 2018, Puskaric ran for election to represent District 39 in the Pennsylvania House of Representatives. He defeated Robert Rhoderick Jr. in the general election for Pennsylvania House of Representatives District 39 on November 6, 2018, with 55.8% of the vote. He sought re-election in 2020, defeating Sara-Summer Oliphant on November 3, 2020, with 62.8% of the vote. In the 2022 Republican primary election, Puskaric lost re-nomination to Andrew Kuzma.

In 2020, Puskaric was among 26 Pennsylvania House Republicans who called for the reversal of Joe Biden's certification as the winner of Pennsylvania's electoral votes in the 2020 United States presidential election, citing false claims of election irregularities.

== Personal ==
Puskaric was employed by Matrix Property Settlements in White Oak, Pennsylvania, as a director of settlement operations.
