= Baptiste Manzini =

American football player and coach (1920–2008)

Bap Manzini

No. 44, 50, 66, 55, 53
- Position: Center

Personal information
- Born: August 27, 1920; Treveskyn, Pennsylvania, U.S.
- Died: May 9, 2008 (aged 87); Belle Vernon, Pennsylvania, U.S.
- Listed height: 5 ft 11 in (1.80 m)
- Listed weight: 195 lb (88 kg)

Career information
- College: Saint Vincent (1942)
- NFL draft: 1943: 21st round, 192nd overall pick

Career history
- Philadelphia Eagles (1944–1945); Detroit Lions (1948); Philadelphia Eagles (1948)

Awards and highlights
- NFL champion (1948)

Career NFL statistics
- Games played: 23
- Starts: 10
- Interceptions: 1
- Fumble recoveries: 2
- Stats at Pro Football Reference

Baptiste John "Bap" Manzini (August 27, 1920 – May 9, 2008) was a professional American football center and high school football coach.

Manzini was born August 27, 1920, in Treveskyn, Pennsylvania. He attended Saint Vincent College, where he was an all-state center. Upon graduation, he joined the United States Air Force. He played three seasons in the National Football League (NFL), 1944 and 1945 for the Philadelphia Eagles and 1948, one game for the Detroit Lions and three games again for the Eagles. When his playing career ended, he coached high school football in Pennsylvania for 30 years at the former Bellmar High School and at Thomas Jefferson High School. Overall, his record was 203–74–8.
