= West Jefferson Hills School District =

School district in Pennsylvania, USA

Coordinates: 40.30649°N 79.92965°W

Address
- 830 Old Clairton Road Jefferson Hills, Pennsylvania; United States

District information
- Type: Public school district
- Grades: K-12
- District ID: conference = WPIAL

Students and staff
- District mascot: Jaguar
- Colors: Black and gold

Other information
- Website: www.wjhsd.net

West Jefferson Hills School District is a midsized, suburban, public school system for residents of Jefferson Hills, West Elizabeth, and Pleasant Hills. Each of these South Hills communities are suburbs of Pittsburgh, Pennsylvania. West Jefferson Hills School District encompasses approximately 20 square miles. Per the 2015 local census data, it serves a resident population of 20,500.

== Schools ==
=== Thomas Jefferson High School ===
Thomas Jefferson High School Was built on property owned by two separate land owners. One of the original properties was part of Chamberlin Farm and served as the main orchard. Land was acquired by emanate domain to build the original High School. High School serves grades nine through twelve with a current enrollment of approximately 1,000 students in a community of approximately 20,150 residents comprising West Elizabeth, Jefferson Hills and Pleasant Hills Borough. Thomas Jefferson High School provides a comprehensive academic program and competitive athletics. Approximately seventy percent of graduating seniors go on to four-year college programs. A brand-new 300,000 square-foot building officially opened its doors for the 2019–2020 school year. The new Thomas Jefferson High School has three main components which include an Arts Wing, Academic Wing, and Athletic Wing with the main entry architecture modeled after Thomas Jefferson's Monticello. A beautiful mural commissioned by TJ Arts flanks the atrium and features a large-scale portrait of Thomas Jefferson by Dennis Stocke, local artist and art teacher at Boyce Middle School in the Upper St. Clair School District. The state-of-the-art high school is designed to maximize learning through diverse, collaborative, technology-rich spaces and support a variety of teaching methods to meet the needs of every student and personalize learning for years to come.

=== Pleasant Hills Middle School ===
Pleasant Hills Middle School is located in the Pleasant Hills Borough at 404 Old Clairton Road. The school serves students in sixth, seventh, and eighth grades. The school was constructed in 1965 and recently celebrated its 50th anniversary. A major renovation was completed in 2004 providing an upgrade to classrooms, facilities and additional learning spaces.

=== Jefferson Hills Intermediate School ===
Jefferson Hills Intermediate School currently has an enrollment of approximately 750 students in grades 3–5 built around personalized learning and customization to meet the needs of every student. In addition to the core academic areas, students attend art, music, physical education, and library on a weekly rotation. Additionally, students also will have the opportunity to participate in an instrumental band and choral program beginning in fourth grade.

Mr. Very is the principal of Jefferson Hills Intermediate School.

=== Gill Hall Elementary ===
Gill Hall Elementary is one of two K-2 elementary schools in the West Jefferson Hills School District. Gill Hall was originally built in 1955 with only 8 classrooms, and was renovated in 1962, 1992, and 2002.Mr. Adam Zunic is the principal of Gill Hall Elementary School. Gill Hall is a primary school with over 300 students enrolled in K-2. There are four to five classrooms of each level with class sizes ranging from 19 to 28 students. There are 13 regular classroom teachers, as well as part- or full-time music, art, physical education, library, gifted, writing, science, and learning support teachers. Gill Hall also has a part-time school counselor, as well as a full-time school police officer. Curriculum and Instruction are based on the WJHSD core values of personalizing instruction to the meet the needs of each student. A 10 classroom addition and renovation were completed in November 2019 to accommodate increasing enrollment. In 2015, Gill Hall was ranked as the 4th leading elementary school in Allegheny County.

=== McClellan Elementary School ===
The doors to McClellan Elementary opened on January 3, 1956, when there were only 165 students in grades 1–6. As the population continued to increase, McClellan has undergone three renovations (in 1958, 1981 and 2002). McClellan Elementary currently has a population of approximately 433 students in grades Kindergarten through second grade, with a staff of 38 educators. This includes 18 classroom teachers, 2 tutorial reading teachers, 2 special education teachers, 4 para-professionals, 2 PCAs, and 1 physical education teacher. Mr. Justin Liberatore is the principal.

== Extracurriculars ==
West Jefferson Hills School District offers a variety of clubs, activities and an extensive sports program.

=== Athletics ===
The District funds:

Boys

- Baseball – AAA
- Basketball- AAA
- Cross country – AA
- Football – AAAA
- Golf – AAA
- Hockey – AA
- Indoor track and field – AAAA
- Soccer – AA
- Swimming and diving – AA
- Tennis – AA
- Track and field – AAA
- Volleyball – AA
- Wrestling – AAA

Girls

- Basketball – AAA
- Cross country – AA
- Gymnastics
- Indoor track and field – AAAA
- Soccer (Fall) – AA
- Softball – AAA
- Swimming and diving – AA
- Tennis – AA
- Track and field – AAA
- Volleyball – AA

Middle School Sports

Boys

- Basketball
- Cross country
- Football
- Swimming and diving
- Track and field
- Wrestling

Girls

- Basketball
- Cross country
- Swimming and diving
- Volleyball

According to PIAA directory July 2012

Thomas Jefferson has a long history of sports excellence. Most recently the Thomas Jefferson Football team has won the state title in 2004, 2007, 2008, 2019, and 2020. Additionally, the Jaguars won the PIAA boys soccer championship in 2002.

On the WPIAL level Thomas Jefferson has also achieved significant success. These WPIAL team championships include:

Thomas Jefferson High School WPIAL Championship Teams
Sport	Class	Year(s)
Football	AAAA	1980, 2004, 2006, 2007, 2008, 2015, 2016, 2017, 2019, 2020
Boys Soccer	AA	2001, 2002, 2004
Girls Track	AA	1987, 1988, 1991
Boys Track	AA	1991, 2019
Girls Softball	AAA	2014
Girls Volleyball	AA	2001
