= Regis Malady =

American politician

Regis R. Malady
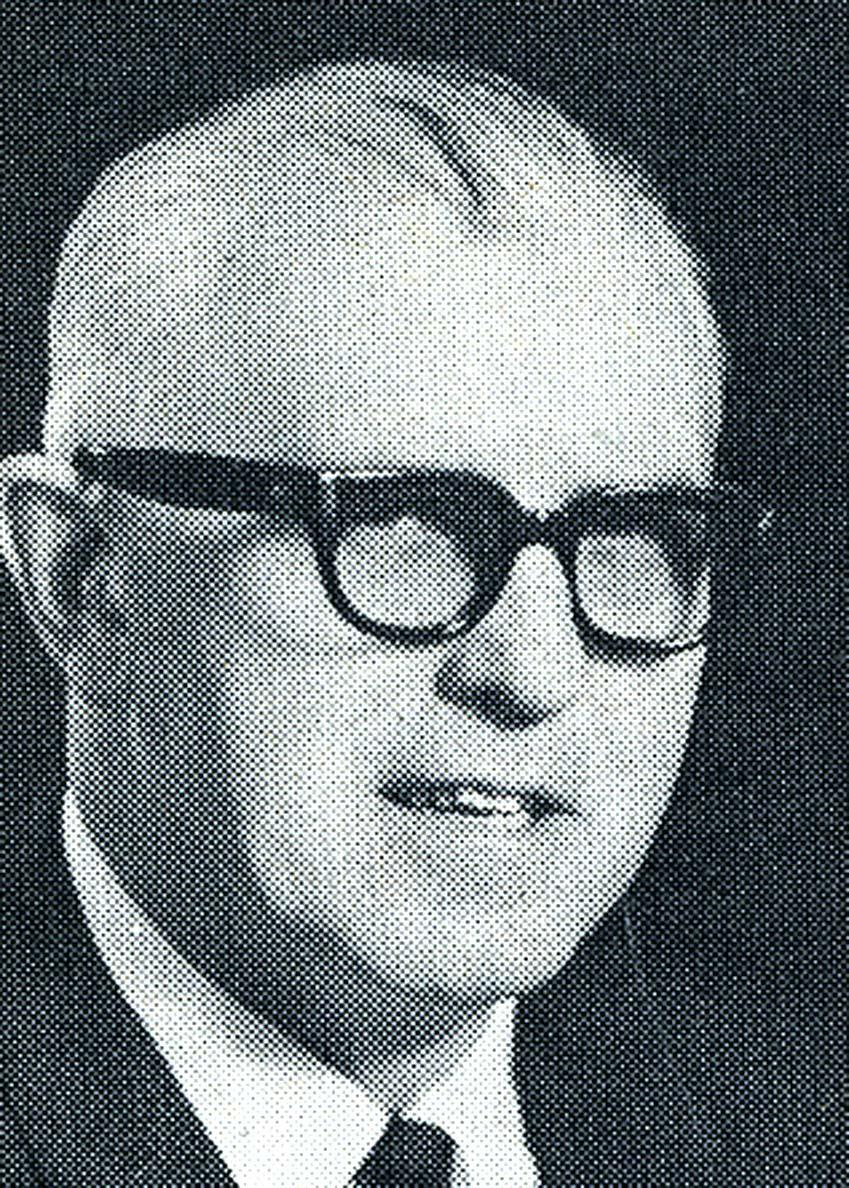

Member of the Pennsylvania House of Representatives from the 39th district
- In office 1969–1974
- Preceded by: District created
- Succeeded by: George Miscevich

Personal details
- Born: February 9, 1917 Elizabeth Township, Pennsylvania
- Died: May 1, 1985 (aged 68) Elizabeth Township, Pennsylvania
- Party: Democratic

Regis Rowland Malady (February 9, 1917 – May 1, 1985) was a Democratic member of the Pennsylvania House of Representatives.

== See also ==
- Regis R. Malady Bridge
