= Peters Creek (Pennsylvania) =

Stream in Pennsylvania, US

Peters Creek Tributary to Monongahela River
- Location of Peters Creek mouth Peters Creek (Pennsylvania) (the United States)

Location
- Country: United States
- State: Pennsylvania
- County: Allegheny; Washington
- Borough: Clairton

Physical characteristics
- Source: Little Chartiers Creek divide
  - location: Thomas, Pennsylvania
  - coordinates: 40°14′08″N 080°05′52″W
  - elevation: 1,200 ft (370 m)
- Mouth: Monongahela River
  - location: Clairton, Pennsylvania
  - coordinates: 40°18′34″N 079°52′52″W
  - elevation: 719 ft (219 m)
- Length: 16.16 mi (26.01 km)
- Basin size: 51.44 square miles (133.2 km^{2})
- Discharge
  - location: Monongahela River
  - average: 54.41 cu ft/s (1.541 m^{3}/s) at mouth with Monongahela River

Basin features
- Progression: northeast
- River system: Monongahela River
- Tributaries
  - left: Piney Fork; Lick Run; Beam Run; Lewis Run

Peters Creek is a 16.8-mile-long (27.0 km) tributary of the Monongahela River and part of the Ohio River and Mississippi River watersheds, flowing through southwestern Pennsylvania in the United States.

== Variant names ==
According to the Geographic Names Information System, it has also been known historically as Peter's Creek.

== Course ==
Peters Creek starts in Nottingham Township in Washington County and runs generally northerly until it joins the Monongahela River at Clairton in Allegheny County.

== Watershed ==
The Peters Creek watershed is a diverse fifty square miles in southwestern Allegheny County and northeastern Washington County. From the heavy industry in the east where Peters Creek enters the Monongahela River, to the commercial northeast, the suburban northern communities, and the still rural and farming south, the watershed is a veritable patchwork of land use types. There is also a county park, a turnpike, a landfill, and a coal mining legacy to add to the mix. Some communities are relatively stable while others are undergoing rapid development. Peters Creek and its tributaries provide utility to them all in a myriad of ways.

== Tributaries ==
- Lewis Run, in Jefferson Hills
- Beam's Run, in Jefferson Hills
- Lick Run, in South Park Township
- Piney Fork Run, in South Park Township

Peters Creek also collects numerous unnamed tributaries along its course.

== Water quality and recreation ==
Because of past water quality issues, Peters Creek was not considered to have any recreational purpose, but since the 1990s the water quality has improved dramatically. Once plagued with garbage and acid mine drainage, the water quality is now high enough to support its own fish population, which includes trout, bass, catfish, carp, and bluegill. It is now again possible to enjoy the stream through such activities as fishing, swimming, and during high water, kayaking. There is also a new bike trail that runs along its bank, formerly part of the Montour Railroad.

== See also ==
- List of rivers of Pennsylvania
