= 2018 Pennsylvania's 18th congressional district special election =

- March 13, 2018

Pennsylvania's 18th congressional district
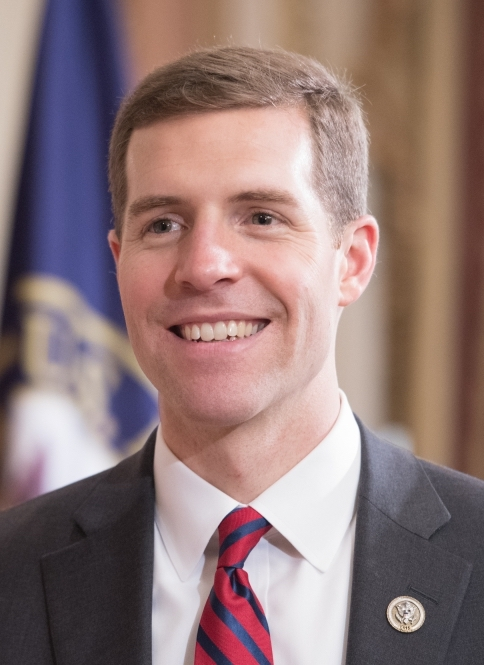

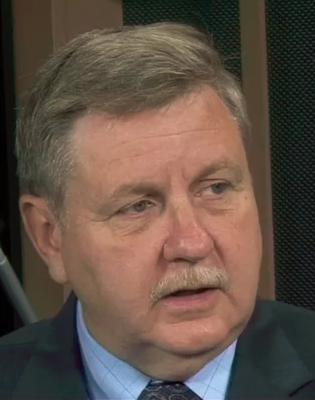
Nominee	Conor Lamb	Rick Saccone
Party	Democratic	Republican
Popular vote	114,102	113,347
Percentage	49.9%	49.5%
- County results Lamb: 50–60% Saccone: 50–60%
U.S. Representative before election
Tim Murphy
Republican
Elected U.S. Representative
Conor Lamb
Democratic

A special election for Pennsylvania's 18th congressional district was held on March 13, 2018, following the resignation of Republican representative Tim Murphy. Murphy, who held the seat since January 3, 2003, declared his intent to resign on October 5, 2017, and vacated his seat on October 21 that year. In a close race, Democrat Conor Lamb defeated Republican Rick Saccone 49.86% to 49.53%. Saccone conceded the race eight days after the election.

== Background ==
Eight-term incumbent Republican U.S. Representative Tim Murphy was involved in a sex scandal consisting of his allegedly having extramarital sexual relations with a woman and then asking her to have an abortion. This was particularly damaging because Murphy identifies as a pro-life politician. Murphy subsequently announced that he was resigning and that he would leave office on October 21.

Primary elections were not held in the race. Instead, nominees were chosen by each party. The Republican Party held a special convention on November 11, 2017, to choose a nominee through a conferee process involving 215 local Republican activists. The Democratic Party held their nominating convention on November 19, 2017, in the gym at Washington High School in Washington, Pennsylvania. The Libertarian Party of Allegheny County and the Libertarian Party of Washington County nominated a candidate via party caucus.

At the time, Pennsylvania's 18th Congressional District was located in Western Pennsylvania and bordered the state of West Virginia. It included portions of Greene, Washington, Allegheny and Westmoreland counties. The district had a Cook PVI score of R+11. This was the last election for Pennsylvania's 18th congressional district held under the configuration made in 2011 by the Pennsylvania Legislature as new districts have been drawn in accordance with the ruling of the state supreme court in League of Women Voters v. Commonwealth of Pennsylvania and came into effect for the main 2018 congressional elections in November. The bulk of the old 18th became the 14th District.

== Republican conferee meeting ==
=== Candidates ===
==== Declared ====
- Guy Reschenthaler, state senator
- Rick Saccone, state representative
- Kim Ward, state senator

==== Failed to qualify ====
- George Karpacs, Pennsylvania College Access Program board member

==== Withdrew ====
- Jason Ortitay, state representative

=== Results ===
Republican conferee meeting
Candidate	First ballot	Pct.	Second ballot	Pct.
Rick Saccone	74	34.4%	123	57.5%
Guy Reschenthaler	75	34.9%	91	42.5%
Kim Ward	66	30.7%	Eliminated	

== Democratic convention ==
=== Candidates ===
==== Declared ====
- Rueben Brock, psychologist and California University of Pennsylvania assistant professor
- Gina Cerilli, Westmoreland County Commissioner
- Mike Crossey, former Allegheny County Councillor and former teachers' union official
- Pam Iovino, former Assistant Department of Veterans Affairs Secretary
- Conor Lamb, former Assistant United States Attorney for the Western District of Pennsylvania
- Keith Seewald, small business owner and author
- Bob Solomon, physician

==== Declined ====
- Dan Miller, state representative
- Brandon Neuman, state representative

=== Results ===
Democratic convention
Candidate	First ballot	Pct.	Second ballot	Pct.
Conor Lamb	225	40.6%	319	58.5%
Gina Cerilli	153	27.6%	152	27.9%
Pam Iovino	90	16.2%	74	13.6%
Mike Crossey	47	8.5%	Eliminated	
Rueben Brock	21	3.8%	Eliminated	
Bob Solomon	18	3.2%	Eliminated	
Keith Seewald	0	0.0%	Eliminated	

== Libertarian Party nomination ==
The Libertarian candidate was Pittsburgh attorney Drew Gray Miller. Prior to this, however, a primary candidate was Philip Moses, a high school government teacher. Moses ended his campaign in early 2018.

== General election ==
=== Candidates ===
- Conor Lamb (Democratic), former Assistant United States Attorney for the Western District of Pennsylvania
- Drew Gray Miller (Libertarian), former Legal Counsel to the Majority Whip of the Pennsylvania Senate

Official Sample Ballot

- Rick Saccone (Republican), state representative

=== Predictions ===
Source	Ranking	As of
The Cook Political Report	Tossup	February 27, 2018
Inside Elections	Tossup	February 28, 2018
Sabato's Crystal Ball	Tossup	March 8, 2018

=== Campaign ===
The major party candidates were Republican Rick Saccone and Democrat Conor Lamb, in a district that Donald Trump carried by almost 20 points in the 2016 presidential election. The special election attracted national attention and was seen by many political analysts and commentators as a bellwether on the popularity of Donald Trump, Trump's tariffs on steel and aluminum imports, and the Republican Party. Saccone said the special election was a referendum on Trump's presidency and called himself "Trump before Trump was Trump". Prominent Republicans including Donald Trump (twice), Donald Trump Jr., Ivanka Trump, and Mike Pence came to the state to campaign for Saccone. The district was contested by a third-party candidate (Libertarian Drew Gray Miller) for the first time since 1996.

=== Campaign funding ===
Republicans and aligned groups spent more than twice as much as Democrats and aligned groups on the special election. Although Lamb's campaign fund raised more than Saccone's campaign fund, Saccone benefited from far more spending by outside groups than Lamb.

The Republican Party and outside pro-Republican "independent expenditure" groups spent almost $10.7 million to support Saccone or oppose Lamb in the campaign, while $2.6 million in independent expenditures was spent in support of Lamb. Fourteen outside groups (seven Republican, seven Democrat) comprised over 95% of the spending. For the Republican side, the major groups spending money on Saccone's behalf were Paul Ryan's Congressional Leadership Fund, the National Republican Congressional Committee, the Republican National Committee, and the pro-Trump groups America First Action and 45Committee. For the Democratic side, the major groups spending money on Lamb's behalf were the Democratic Congressional Campaign Committee, Patriot Majority PAC, and the VoteVets.org Action Fund.

=== Debates ===
KDKA-TV hosted the first debate on February 19, 2018. WTAE-TV hosted the second and final debate on March 3, 2018, at 7 PM EST. The debate was hosted live by WTAE-TV along with the League of Women Voters of Greater Pittsburgh.

Host network	Date	Link(s)	Participants		
Host network	Date	Link(s)	Conor Lamb (D)	Drew Gray Miller (L)	Rick Saccone (R)
WTAE-TV	March 3, 2018		Invited	—	Invited
KDKA-TV	February 19, 2018		Invited	—	Invited

=== Endorsements ===
Rick Saccone (R)

Executive branch officials

- John R. Bolton, former ambassador to the United Nations (2005–2006)
- Mike Pence, vice president of the United States (2017–2021)

Unions

- Fraternal Order of Police, Allegheny County, Lodge 91

Organizations

- CatholicVote.org
- Club for Growth
- Congressional Leadership Fund
- Ending Spending Inc.
- Firearms Owners Against Crime
- LifePAC
- National Right to Life
- NRA Political Victory Fund
- Tea Party Express

Newspapers

- Pittsburgh Post-Gazette
Conor Lamb (D)

Federal politicians

- Joe Biden, former vice president of the United States and former U.S. senator (D-DE)
- Bob Casey Jr., U.S. senator (D-PA)
- Dwight Evans, U.S. representative (D-PA)
- Doug Jones, U.S. senator (D-AL)
- Joe Kennedy III, U.S. representative (D-MA)
- Seth Moulton, U.S. representative (D-MA)

Local and statewide politicians

- Gina Cerilli, Westmoreland County Commissioner
- John Fetterman, mayor of Braddock, PA and candidate for the U.S. Senate in 2016
- Rich Fitzgerald, Allegheny County Executive
- Josh Shapiro, Pennsylvania Attorney General
- Pam Snyder, state representative
- Tom Wolf, governor of Pennsylvania

Individuals

- Randy Bryce, ironworker, union activist, veteran and candidate for United States House of Representatives in Wisconsin in 2018
- Jason Kander, nominee for U.S. Senate in Missouri in 2016, former Missouri Secretary of State, host of podcast Majority 54, and founder of Let America Vote
- Katie McGinty, nominee for U.S. Senate in 2016, former Chief of Staff to Governor Tom Wolf, and former secretary of the Pennsylvania Department of Environmental Protection
- Martin O'Malley, former governor of Maryland
- Cecil Roberts, president of the United Mine Workers of America

Labor unions

- International Brotherhood of Electrical Workers
- National Education Association
- Pennsylvania Conference of Teamsters
- Pennsylvania State AFL–CIO
- Pennsylvania State Education Association
- SEIU Healthcare Pennsylvania
- Service Employees International Union Local 32BJ
- Service Employees International Union Local 668
- United Mine Workers of America
- United Steelworkers

Organizations

- Act to Matter
- Alliance for Retired Americans
- Blue Dog Coalition
- Democratic Congressional Campaign Committee
- End Citizens United
- Humane Society Legislative Fund
- J Street
- Let America Vote
- National Committee to Preserve Social Security and Medicare
- Raising Our Future PAC
- Social Security Works PAC
- Steel City Stonewall Democrats
- VoteVets.org

Newspapers and news websites

- Daily Kos, political news blog
- The Observer-Reporter
Drew Gray Miller (L)

Politicians

- Caleb Q. Dyer, New Hampshire Libertarian state representative
- Gary Johnson, former governor of New Mexico
- Brandon Phinney, New Hampshire Libertarian state representative
- Joseph Stallcop, New Hampshire Libertarian state representative

=== Polling ===
Poll source	Date(s) administered	Sample size	Margin of error	Rick Saccone (R)	Conor Lamb (D)	Other	Undecided
Monmouth University	March 8–11, 2018	372	± 5.1%	45%	51%	1%	3%
RABA Research	March 6–8, 2018	707	± 3.7%	44%	48%	–	9%
Gravis Marketing	March 1–5, 2018	911	± 3.3%	45%	42%	–	13%
Emerson College	March 1–3, 2018	474	± 4.8%	45%	48%	–	7%
Gravis Marketing	February 13–15, 2018	602	± 4.2%	45%	40%	–	15%
Monmouth University	February 12–14, 2018	320	± 5.5%	49%	46%	1%	4%
DFM Research (D)	January 18–19, 2018	384	± 5.0%	41%	38%	–	21%
Gravis Marketing	January 3–5, 2018	513	± 4.3%	46%	34%	–	20%

=== Results ===
Pennsylvania's 18th congressional district special election, 2018
Party	Candidate	Votes	%	±%
Democratic	Conor Lamb	114,102	49.86%	+49.86%
Republican	Rick Saccone	113,347	49.53%	−50.47%
Libertarian	Drew Gray Miller	1,381	0.60%	+0.60%
Total votes		228,830	100.00%	
Plurality		755	0.33%	-99.67%
Democratic gain from Republican		Swing		

Lamb declared victory just after midnight on March 14. With all precincts reporting, Lamb led Saccone by 627 votes, a margin of 0.2 percent. NBC News declared Lamb the apparent winner early on the morning of March 14, based on the remaining absentee ballots from Washington County. The New York Times followed suit later that afternoon. A few other outlets declared Lamb the winner in what has been described as "a major upset", but others withheld judgment, citing the closeness of the race and the likelihood of a recount. Saccone conceded the race to Lamb on March 21, the day that the last votes were counted. Allegheny County certified its election results on April 2, making Conor Lamb's victory official. He was sworn in on April 12.

Lamb's victory came primarily on the strength of winning the Allegheny County portion of the district by almost 15,400 votes, as he lost the rest of the district by 14,700 votes.

==== Results by county ====
Vote breakdown by county
	Conor Lamb Democrat		Rick Saccone Republican		Drew Gray Miller Libertarian		Margin		Total
County	Votes	%	Votes	%	Votes	%	Votes	%	Votes
Allegheny	58,874	57.25%	43,398	42.24%	526	0.51%	15,476	15.01%	102,798
Greene	2,022	41.56%	2,800	57.56%	43	0.88%	778	16.00%	4,865
Washington	22,757	46.16%	26,198	53.14%	344	0.70%	3,441	6.98%	49,299
Westmoreland	30,449	42.37%	40,951	56.98%	468	0.65%	10,502	14.61%	71,868

== See also ==
- List of close election results
- List of special elections to the United States House of Representatives
- United States House of Representatives elections in Pennsylvania, 2016
- Pennsylvania's 12th congressional district special election, 2010
