= George Miscevich =

American politician

Member of the Pennsylvania House of Representatives from the 39th district
- In office 1981–1984
- Preceded by: Robb Austin
- Succeeded by: David K. Levdansky
- In office 1975–1978
- Preceded by: Regis R. Malady
- Succeeded by: Robb Austin

Personal details
- Born: August 7, 1932
- Died: December 24, 2003 (aged 71) Elizabeth Township, Pennsylvania
- Party: Democratic

George Miscevich (August 7, 1932 – December 24, 2003) was a former Democratic member of the Pennsylvania House of Representatives.
