= Bear's Retreat =

Historic house in Pennsylvania, US

Coordinates: 40.3275°N 79.9543°W

Bear's Retreat is a historic house in Pleasant Hills, Pennsylvania, primarily known for its age.

It is a privately owned house dating back to c. 1794, being lived in as of 2011. The southern log side was built by Jacob Bare in 1794. It is believed he was a German immigrant based on the three-story construction of the log section. Despite plenty of room to build his home, large, heavy, hand-hewn logs were raised higher and higher into place in the traditional building custom of his homeland. The Northern "new addition" brick side built in 1840. The red-brick exterior was made on-site using the abundant clay found on the property. Remains of the outdoor summer kitchen are still clearly present.

The property was designated a Pittsburgh History and Landmarks Foundation Historic Landmark in 1983.
