= Rick Saccone =

American politician (born 1958)

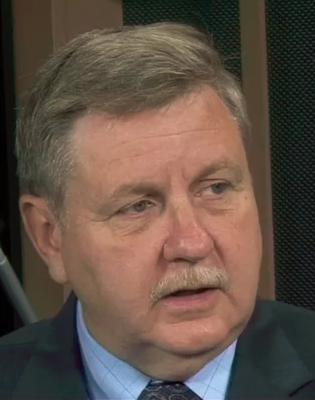

Member of the Pennsylvania House of Representatives from the 39th district
- In office January 4, 2011 – November 30, 2018
- Preceded by: David Levdansky
- Succeeded by: Mike Puskaric

Personal details
- Born: Richard Saccone; February 14, 1958 (age 68) McKeesport, Pennsylvania, U.S.
- Party: Republican
- Spouse: Yong Saccone (died 2023)
- Children: 2
- Education: Weber State College (BS); University of Oklahoma (MPA); Naval Postgraduate School (MA); University of Pittsburgh (PhD)

Military service
- Allegiance: United States
- Branch/service: United States Air Force
- Unit: Office of Special Investigations

Richard Saccone (born February 14, 1958) is an American educator and far-right politician who represented Pennsylvania's 39th district in the Pennsylvania House of Representatives from 2011 to 2018. A Republican, he was his party's nominee for the March 2018 special election to fill in the vacant U.S. House seat for the 18th congressional district. Saccone lost to Democratic candidate Conor Lamb by a margin of 0.3%.

In January 2021, Saccone posted a video of himself on Facebook while standing in view of the January 6 United States Capitol attack. He posted on Facebook that, "We are storming the capitol. Our vanguard has broken thru the barricades. We will save this nation. Are you with me?" He later added that he and the other rioters would "run out all the evil people in there, and all the RINOs that have betrayed our president." Following an investigation into Saccone's role in the attack on the Capitol, Saccone resigned his position as an adjunct professor at Saint Vincent College before he could be dismissed.

On August 31, 2021, Saccone declared his intention to run for lieutenant governor in the 2022 Pennsylvania gubernatorial election. He finished second in the primary behind Carrie DelRosso.

== Education and career ==
Saccone received a bachelor's degree in psychology/criminal justice from Weber State College in 1981, a master's degree in public administration from the University of Oklahoma in 1984, and a master's degree in national security affairs from the Naval Postgraduate School in 1987. Saccone received a Ph.D. in public and international affairs from the University of Pittsburgh in 2002.

He was later on the faculty of Saint Vincent College in Latrobe, Pennsylvania. He served as a United States Air Force officer, working in the Office of Special Investigation, counter intelligence. After resigning from the Air Force, Saccone was a civilian employee of the U.S. Army during the Iraq War, working in Iraq from 2004 to 2005. While in Iraq, Saccone worked as an interrogation consultant at Abu Ghraib prison.

According to his official and campaign biographies, Saccone worked as an anchor for an English-language television news station in South Korea, and worked for businesses in South Korea and Central America. He spent 12 years in South Korea, where he met his wife.

Saccone's official biography states that he worked in North Korea on "an agreement meant to prevent the development of nuclear weapons there." However, Saccone was not a diplomat, but rather was one of several U.S. representatives for the Korean Peninsula Energy Development Organization, working there from December 2000 to December 2001. The organization handled a construction project to generate civilian nuclear energy for North Korea while preventing the country from making nuclear weapons. Former U.S. and Southern Korean colleagues said that Saccone had embellished his role, and that he was present at negotiations with North Korea only as a low-level observer. Saccone wrote two books about dealing with North Korea and his time spent there, Living with the Enemy: Inside North Korea, and Negotiating with North Korea.

== Political career ==
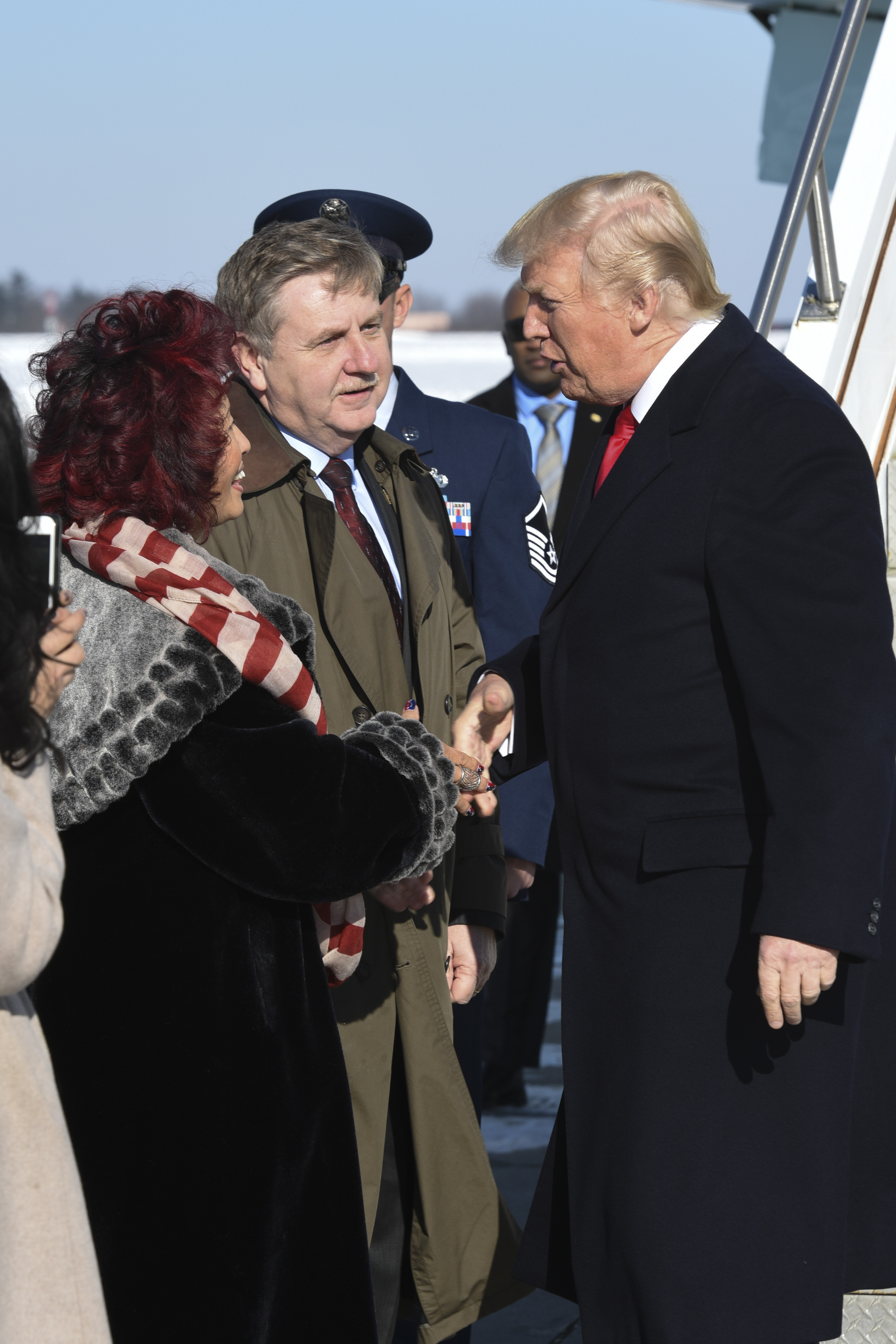
Saccone and his wife greeting U.S. President Donald Trump

=== Pennsylvania House of Representatives ===
In 2010, Saccone challenged incumbent Democratic Rep. David Levdansky for the 39th District seat in the Pennsylvania House of Representatives, and defeated Levdansky by 151 votes (50.3% to 49.7%). Levdansky challenged Saccone to a rematch in 2012; Saccone defeated him again by a margin of 50.2%-49.8%.

Saccone was re-elected with 60% of the vote in 2014 and 70% in 2016. The district includes part of Allegheny County and part of Washington County.

=== 2018 U.S. Senate run ===
In February 2017, Saccone filed with the FEC to run for United States Senate in the 2018 election, seeking to challenge incumbent Bob Casey Jr., and officially declared his candidacy later that month.

Saccone is a supporter of Donald Trump and pledged to be a Trump ally if elected to the Senate. On October 8, 2017, he suspended his U.S. Senate campaign to announce that he would seek the Republican nomination for the 18th Congressional District special election.

=== 2018 18th congressional district special election ===
On November 11, 2017, Saccone became the Republican nominee for the 18th congressional district special election held on March 13, 2018. The special election attracted national attention. Republicans spent more than $8 million on television advertising, twice as much as the Democrats, and Republican stars including Donald Trump (twice), Donald Trump Jr., Ivanka Trump, and Mike Pence came to the state to campaign for Saccone. As of March 14, Lamb led Saccone by 647 votes, mainly due to winning the Allegheny County portion of the district by 15,400 votes; Saccone won the rest of the district by 14,700 votes. The result of the election was considered too close to call by most news outlets, since the candidates were separated by only 0.2 percent, and a recount was expected. However, when it became apparent that Saccone would not be able to overcome Lamb's slim lead, he called Lamb to concede the race on March 21. In the final tally, Saccone lost by 0.3 percent.

=== Regular 14th congressional district election ===
After the Pennsylvania Supreme Court threw out the congressional map drawn by the state legislature and replaced it with a court-drawn map, most of the old 18th District was renumbered as the 14th district. On paper, the new 14th is even more Republican than its predecessor; Trump would have won it by 29 points had it existed in 2016. On March 15, Saccone announced that regardless of the final result in the special election for the 18th, he will run in the regular election for the new 14th. On May 15, Saccone lost the primary for the 14th district against Guy Reschenthaler (55%-45%).

=== Participation in the 2021 Capitol attack ===
On January 6, 2021, Saccone took part in the pro-Trump riots outside the United States Capitol building. On his Facebook page, he posted a video, in which he said "They broke down the gates. They're macing them up there. We're trying to run out all the evil people in there and all the RINOs who have betrayed our president. We're going to run them out of their offices" and made a post captioned "We are storming the capitol... Are u [sic] with me?", during his participation. Saccone subsequently deleted the video. On January 7, Saccone resigned from his position of adjunct professor at St. Vincent College.

== Political positions ==
=== Donald Trump ===
During his brief 2018 Senate run, Saccone pledged to be a Donald Trump ally if elected to the Senate. In January 2018, Saccone was endorsed by Trump after winning the Republican nomination for the 18th congressional district special election. Saccone closely identifies with Trump and in 2018 called himself "Trump before Trump was Trump."

Saccone's campaign in the 2018 special election attracted national attention, and was seen by many political analysts and commentators as a bellwether on the popularity of the Republican party, Trump's taxes on foreign-made steel and aluminum imports, and the 2018 House election. Saccone has purposely stoked this portrayal, and called the special election a referendum on the Presidency of Donald Trump.

=== Abortion ===
Saccone introduced bills to limit abortion rights. He supported legislation that would effectively ban abortions after 20 weeks of gestation.

=== Church and state ===
Saccone's beliefs are strongly influenced by Christian reconstructionist and author David Barton, who also introduced at a rally during Saccone's 2018 special election run.

In 2013, Saccone attracted attention for introducing the National Motto Display Act, a bill to require public school districts in Pennsylvania to post "In God We Trust" (the national motto) in every school building.

The 2013 legislation failed, but in 2016, Saccone co-sponsored similar legislation (which would encourage but not mandate the posting of the motto in schools). The bill passed on a 179–20 vote in May 2016. The legislation was criticized by secular advocacy groups, such as the Freedom from Religion Foundation. Also in 2013, Saccone sponsored a "day of prayer" resolution, seeking to designate April 30 as a National Fast Day.

In January 2012, Saccone introduced to the state House a nonbinding resolution (Resolution No. 535) to declare 2012 as the "Year of the Bible" in Pennsylvania. The resolution passed unanimously, but was criticized by Americans United for Separation of Church and State. The resolution drew considerable political controversy in Pennsylvania, as well as national attention.

The Freedom from Religion Foundation filed a federal lawsuit over the resolution, Freedom From Religion Foundation v. Saccone, alleging a violation of the Establishment Clause. U.S. District Judge Christopher C. Conner dismissed the suit on the grounds of legislative immunity, but criticized the legislature for using state resources to "provide a re-election sound bite for use by members of the General Assembly."

In an interview in 2017 with the Pastors Network of America, Saccone stated that God wants those who have the "fear of God in them" to "rule over us".

=== Budget, taxation, and fiscal policy ===
Saccone supported the federal Republican tax legislation enacted in 2017, saying "I'm sorry I wasn’t there to vote for it." Over the course of the campaign for the 2018 special election seat, Saccone distanced himself from ads which touted his support for the tax cuts and the ads, which while prominent at the start of the campaign, were cycled out.

In 2017, Saccone was part of a faction of Republican state lawmakers who sought to close a $2.3 billion (~$2.89 billion in 2024) deficit in the state budget through spending cuts alone; Saccone said that he preferred to close the budget gap by redirecting non-General Fund funds in "nonperforming" (unused) special funds but that he was open to across-the-board spending cuts.

=== Education ===
While in office Saccone has consistently called for spending cuts, including to funding for early childhood and K-12 education, public libraries, and child welfare.

=== Guns ===
Saccone is known for his strong advocacy of gun rights. In 2017, he sponsored at least four bills seeking to expand the rights of gun owners; one such bill would amend state law to prohibit discrimination against gun carriers; a co-sponsorship memorandum for the bill criticized Chuck E. Cheese's for its "policy barring customers from carrying firearms inside" the venue.

=== Organized labor ===
Saccone favors right-to-work legislation, which makes it illegal for workers in unionized workplaces to be compelled into joining unions. According to NBC News, "Saccone’s conservative record has united organized labor against him." Saccone disputes the characterization, saying "the union members have always voted for me. Their leadership has never represented their members, and they know that."

In 2017, Saccone sought to limit the practice of allowing some teachers to work full-time for teachers' unions under the classification "teachers on special assignment" (with those teachers' wages reimbursed by the union to the school district). In 2017, three teachers with the Pittsburgh Federation of Teachers worked full-time in that role. Saccone described the employees as "ghost teachers" and sponsored legislation that would limit teachers to no more than 15 days of union activity annually.

=== Lobbying ===
Saccone introduced legislation that would prohibit public officials from accepting "transportation, lodging or hospitality or anything of economic value as a gift" from lobbyists. Saccone said, "I have at least 20 lobbyist groups that have never taken me out for anything. They come to my office, they make their pitch and they go away. And that is how it should be." However, it was later reported that Saccone did routinely get meals paid by lobbyists; Saccone justified getting gifted meals by lobbyists, saying that he had to have the meals with the lobbyists because other lawmakers did and he did not want to isolate himself from other lawmakers.

=== Torture ===
Saccone advocated for waterboarding, sleep deprivation, and other forms of torture in articles and his book.

=== Roy Moore special election ===
In 2017, during a special election campaign for a U.S. Senate seat in Alabama, Saccone defended Republican nominee Roy Moore, who had been accused of sexual misconduct involving teenage girls; after a reporter asked a different Republican state representative (Kathy Rapp), whether she found it "compassionate that your party may soon elect an accused child molester to the United States Senate," Saccone remarked, "Do you believe in the presumption of innocence?"

== Use of legislative expense account ==
According to The Intercept, records from the Pennsylvania General Assembly showed that Saccone used his legislative expense account, which is funded by taxpayers, "for meals, per diem payments, and other items at a rate higher than most lawmakers". The investigation showed that Saccone purchased 36 line items for various flag and flag accessory purchases totaling $4,436.30. Saccone also spent $117,400 to lease an office from Dowling Properties, a real estate company founded by Celine Dowling, one of his campaign donors.

== Personal life ==
Saccone is a Baptist. He was married to Yong Saccone, who died on July 8, 2023. He met her in South Korea. The couple have two sons, Nick and Matthew.

== Electoral history ==
Pennsylvania's 39th House District primary election, 2010
Party	Candidate	Votes	%
Republican	Rick Saccone	2,016	56.03%
Republican	Shawn M. Hess	1,582	43.97%
Total votes		3,598	100.00%

Pennsylvania's 39th House District general election, 2010
Party	Candidate	Votes	%
Republican	Rick Saccone	10,761	50.35%
Democratic	David Levdansky (incumbent)	10,610	49.65%
Total votes		21,371	100.00%
Republican gain from Democratic			

Pennsylvania's 39th House District primary election, 2012
Party	Candidate	Votes	%
Republican	Rick Saccone (incumbent)	2,644	63.44%
Republican	Shauna D'Alessandro	1,524	36.56%
Total votes		4,168	100.00%

Pennsylvania's 39th House District general election, 2012
Party	Candidate	Votes	%
Republican	Rick Saccone (incumbent)	14,495	50.19%
Democratic	David Levdansky	14,383	49.81%
Total votes		28,878	100.00%
Republican hold			

Pennsylvania's 39th House District general election, 2014
Party	Candidate	Votes	%
Republican	Rick Saccone (incumbent)	11,805	60.35%
Democratic	Lisa Stout-Bashioum	7,755	39.65%
Total votes		19,560	100.00%
Republican hold			

Pennsylvania's 39th House District primary election, 2016
Party	Candidate	Votes	%
Republican	Rick Saccone (incumbent)	7,685	100.00%
Total votes		7,685	100.00%

Pennsylvania's 39th House District general election, 2016
Party	Candidate	Votes	%
Republican	Rick Saccone (incumbent)	22,034	68.40%
Democratic	Peter Kobylinski	10,180	31.60%
Total votes		32,214	100.00%
Republican hold			

Pennsylvania's 18th congressional district special election Republican conferree meeting
Candidate	First ballot	Pct.	Second ballot	Pct.
Rick Saccone	74	34.4%	123	57.5%
Guy Reschenthaler	75	34.9%	91	42.5%
Kim Ward	66	30.7%	Eliminated	

Pennsylvania's 18th congressional district special election, 2018
Party	Candidate	Votes	%	±%
Democratic	Conor Lamb	114,102	49.86%	+49.86%
Republican	Rick Saccone	113,347	49.53%	−50.47%
Libertarian	Drew Gray Miller	1,381	0.60%	+0.60%
Total votes		228,830	100.00%	
Plurality		755	0.33%	-99.67%
Democratic gain from Republican		Swing		

Pennsylvania House of Representatives
Preceded by David Levdansky	Member of the Pennsylvania House of Representatives from the 39th district 2011–2019	Succeeded by Mike Puskaric
