= David Levdansky =

American politician

Member of the Pennsylvania House of Representatives from the 39th district
- In office January 3, 1985 – November 30, 2010
- Preceded by: George Miscevich
- Succeeded by: Rick Saccone

Personal details
- Born: October 16, 1954 (age 71) Monongahela, Pennsylvania, U.S.
- Party: Democratic
- Children: 3
- Education: Penn State University (BA); Notre Dame University (MA)
- Occupation: Politician, activist, economist

David Levdansky (born October 16, 1954) is an American politician and member of the Democratic Party. He represented the 39th District in the Pennsylvania House of Representatives from 1985 until 2010.

== Biography ==
Levdansky earned his B.A. in Labor Studies/Political Science from Penn State University in 1978. He went on to receive his M.A. in Economics from the University of Notre Dame in 1980.

Levdansky worked as an associate economic analyst for the Air Line Pilots Association from 1981 to 1982, when he began working for the United Steelworkers of America as an economist-researcher. He later served as an organizer for Region II of the AFL-CIO (1983–84).

He worked as an independent consultant for the West Pennsylvania Advanced Technology Center in 1984.
