= Pleasant Hills, Pennsylvania =

Borough in Pennsylvania, US

- Borough
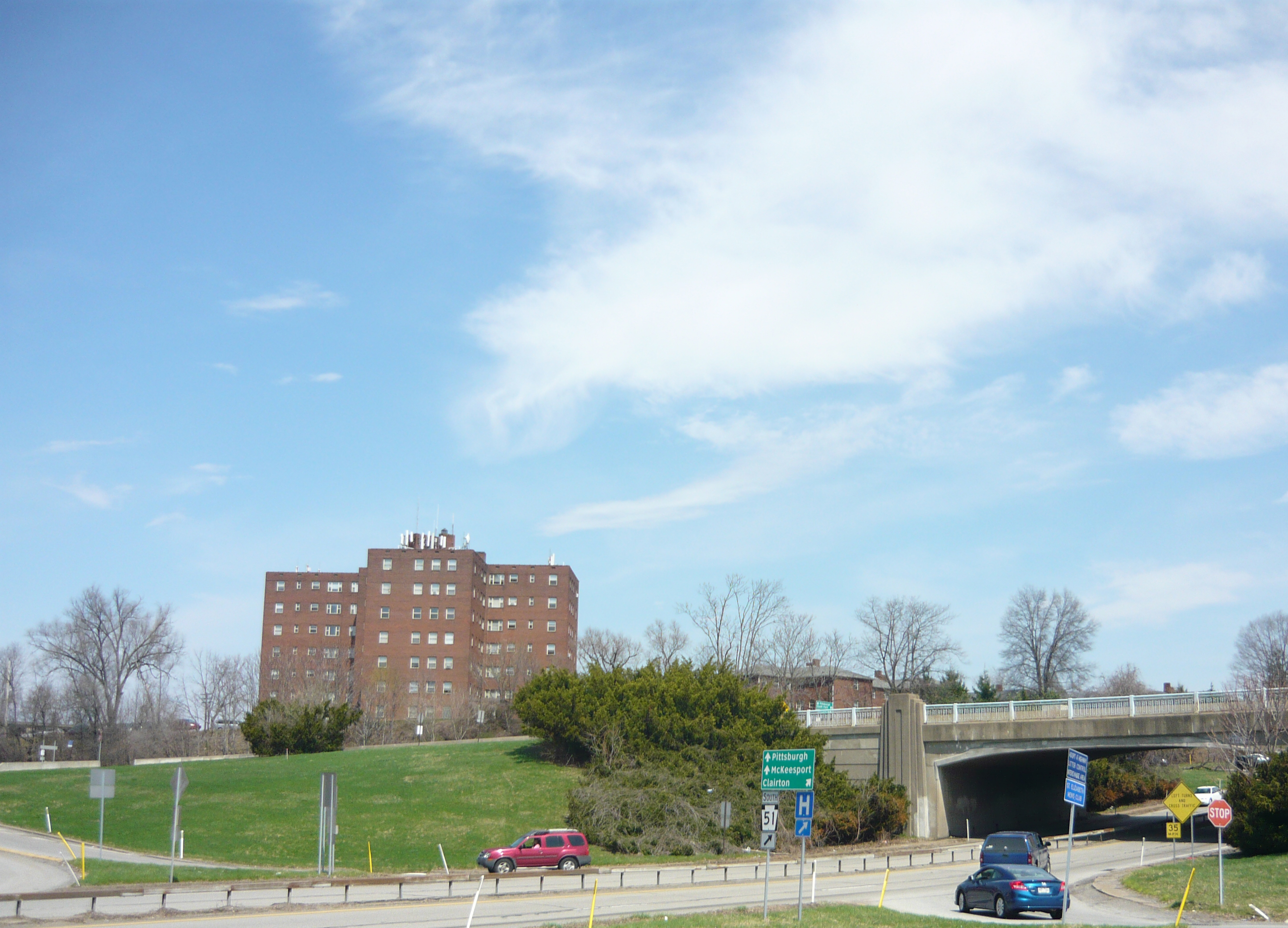
- Cloverleaf with Clairton Boulevard

- Flag Seal

- Location in Allegheny County and the state of Pennsylvania.
- Coordinates: 40°19′56″N 79°57′38″W
- Country: United States
- State: Pennsylvania
- County: Allegheny
- Established: 1947

Government
  - Type: Borough
  - Mayor: William Trimbath
  - Council Members: Andy Codelka; Nicole Leckenby -VP; Cheryl Lee Freedman; Eileen Solinas; Marian Haley; Jarrett Niecgorski - President; Greg Smith
  - State House: Andrew Kuzma
  - State Senate: Devlin Robinson
  - U.S. House: Summer Lee

Area
  - Total: 2.78 sq mi (7.19 km^{2})
  - Land: 2.78 sq mi (7.19 km^{2})
  - Water: 0 sq mi (0.00 km^{2})

Population (2020)
  - Total: 8,504
  - Density: 3,063/sq mi (1,182.8/km^{2})
- Time zone: UTC-5 (Eastern (EST))
  - Summer (DST): UTC-4 (EDT)
- FIPS code: 42-61328
- Website: www.pleasanthillspa.com

Pleasant Hills is a borough in Allegheny County, Pennsylvania, United States. As of the 2020 census, the population was 8,504. It is a suburb of the Pittsburgh metropolitan area.

== History ==
The borough was incorporated into Allegheny County in 1947.

== Geography ==
Pleasant Hills is located at 40°19′56″N 79°57′38″W (40.332219, −79.960488). According to the U.S. Census Bureau, the borough has a total area of 2.78 square miles (7.2 km^{2}), all land.

=== Surrounding communities ===
Pleasant Hills has three borders, including Baldwin to the northwest, West Mifflin to the northeast, and Jefferson Hills to the southeast.

== Demographics ==
Historical population
Census	Pop.	Note	%±
1950	3,808		—
1960	8,573		125.1%
1970	10,409		21.4%
1980	9,604		−7.7%
1990	8,884		−7.5%
2000	8,397		−5.5%
2010	8,268		−1.5%
2020	8,504		2.9%

As of the 2000 census, there were 8,397 people, 3,422 households, and 2,405 families residing in the borough. The population density was 3,084.8 inhabitants per square mile (1,191.0/km^{2}). There were 3,572 housing units at an average density of 1,312.2 per square mile (506.6/km^{2}). The racial makeup of the borough was 97.05% White, 1.31% African American, 0.05% Native American, 1.07% Asian, 0.01% Pacific Islander, 0.14% from other races, and 0.37% from two or more races. Hispanic or Latino of any race were 0.36% of the population.

There were 3,422 households, out of which 28.2% had children under the age of 18 living with them. 61.3% were married couples living together. 7.0% had a female householder with no husband present, and 29.7% were non-families. 26.9% of all households were made up of individuals. 15.2% had someone living alone who was 65 years of age or older. The average household size was 2.42, and the average family size was 2.96.

In the borough, the population was spread out, with 22.0% under the age of 18, 5.7% from 18 to 24, 25.3% from 25 to 44, 26.4% from 45 to 64, and 20.5% who were 65 years of age or older. The median age was 43 years. For every 100 females, there were 91.8 males. For every 100 females age 18 and over, there were 87.8 males. The median income for a household in the borough was $50,289, and the median income for a family was $60,752. Males had a median income of $44,300 versus $31,881 for females. The per capita income for the borough was $25,083. About 2.5% of families and 3.6% of the population were below the poverty line, including 4.2% of those under age 18 and 3.8% of those age 65 or over.

Presidential election results
Year	Republican	Democratic	Third parties
2020	50.3% 2,697	48.3% 2,590	1.4% 74
2016	53% 2,469	45% 2,098	2% 59
2012	55% 2,515	44% 2,052	1% 46

== Notable person ==
- Katie May, model and businesswoman

== See also ==
- Bear's Retreat, a Pittsburgh History and Landmarks Foundation historic landmark
