= Regis R. Malady Bridge =

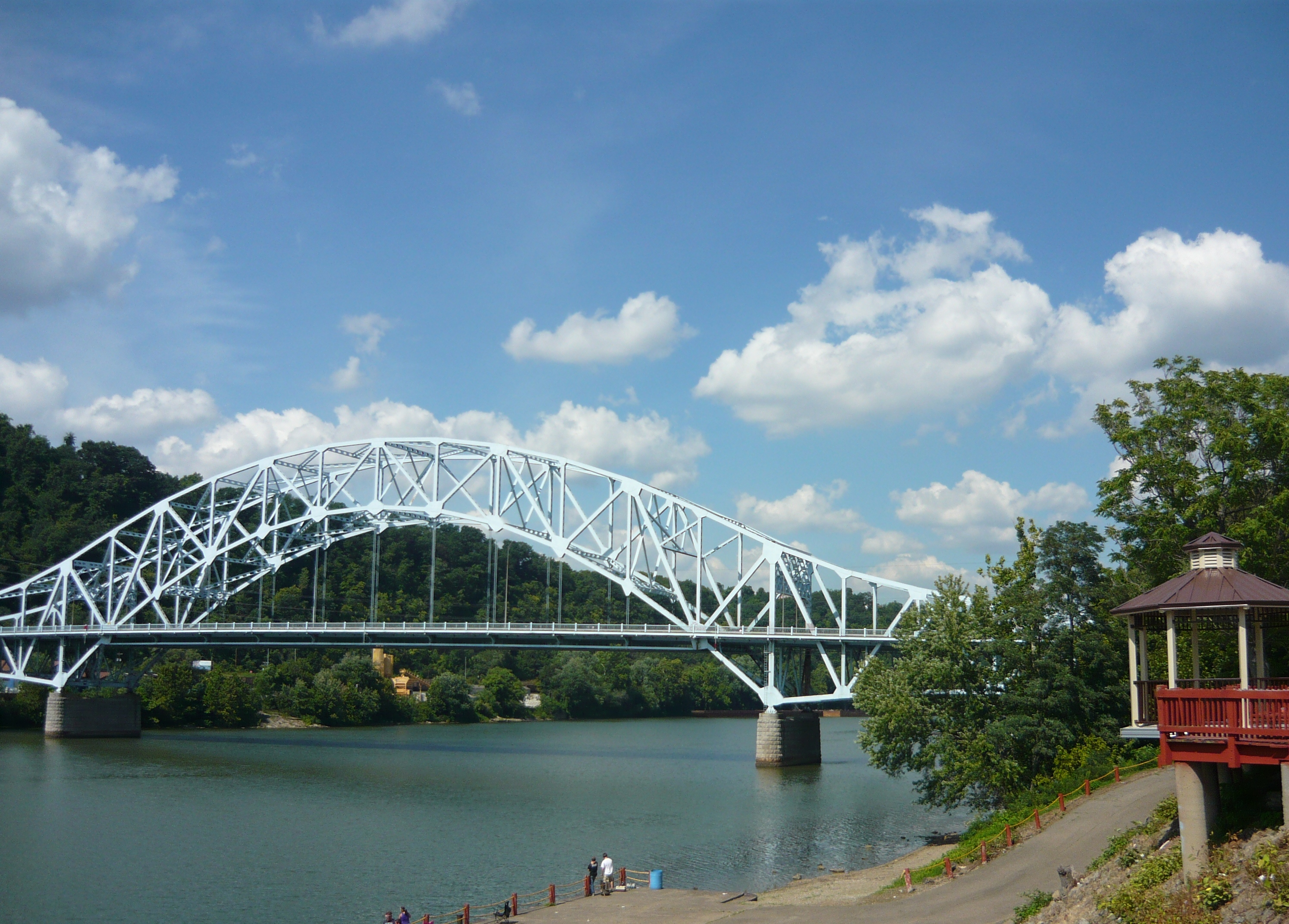
- Coordinates: 40.2751°N 79.8881°W
- Carries: 4 divided lanes of PA 51
- Crosses: Monongahela River
- Locale: Elizabeth, Pennsylvania and West Elizabeth, Pennsylvania
- Other name: Elizabeth Bridge

Characteristics
- Design: Steel arch bridge
- Material: Steel
- Total length: 434.5 feet
- Longest span: 434.5 feet (132.4 m)
- Piers in water: 2
- Clearance below: 50.0 feet (15.2 m)

History
- Opened: 1951

Location
- Interactive map of Regis R. Malady Bridge

The Regis R. Malady Bridge, commonly known as the Elizabeth Bridge, is an arch bridge that carries vehicular traffic across the Monongahela River between Elizabeth, Pennsylvania and West Elizabeth, Pennsylvania. The bridge features freeway ramps at either end, with an exit to Third Street in Elizabeth (signed as Elizabeth/Glassport) on the south bank and exits for Route 837 North to Clairton and Route 837 South to West Elizabeth on the north bank. This bridge replaces an 1893 arch structure that crossed at Plum Street. The bridge was renamed in 1985 after Regis Malady, a former Democratic member of the Pennsylvania House of Representatives whose district included a number of Mon Valley communities.
