= Andrew Kuzma =

American politician

Member of the Pennsylvania House of Representatives from the 39th district
- Incumbent
- Assumed office January 3, 2023
- Preceded by: Mike Puskaric

Personal details
- Born: c. 1996 Pennsylvania, U.S.
- Party: Republican
- Spouse: Hannah Mae
- Children: 1
- Education: University of Pittsburgh (B.S.); Duquesne University (J.D.)
- Alma mater: Elizabeth Forward High School

Andrew M. Kuzma (born c. 1996) is an American politician who represents the 39th District in the Pennsylvania House of Representatives since 2023.

== Education ==
In 2014, Kuzma graduated from Elizabeth Forward High School. In 2018, he attained a B. S. degree in Biological Sciences from the University of Pittsburgh. In 2021, Kuzma obtained his Juris Doctor degree from Duquesne University.

== Political career ==
Kuzma, an attorney by trade, was a commissioner in Elizabeth Township in Allegheny County, Pennsylvania for six years. He began his tenure in 2016 and resigned from the board of commissioners in 2021 after moving out of the ward he represented. From 2019 to 2020 Kuzma was president of the board.

In 2022, Kuzma challenged incumbent Pennsylvania State Representative Mike Puskaric in the Republican primary election. Kuzma had previously supported Puskaric's Democratic opponent in the 2018 election. Kuzma's platform included school choice, election reform, and opposition to the Regional Greenhouse Gas Initiative. He defeated Puskaric with 58% of the vote. Kuzma later defeated Democrat Rick Self in the general election.

== Electoral history ==
2015 Elizabeth Township Board of Commissioners Republican primary election, Ward 3
Party	Candidate	Votes	%
Republican	Andrew Kuzma	63	52.94
Republican	Patrick Dion Provins	44	36.97
Write-in		12	10.08
Total votes		119	100.00

2015 Elizabeth Township Board of Commissioners election, Ward 3
Party	Candidate	Votes	%
Republican	Andrew Kuzma	291	59.51
Democratic	Claire M. Bryce	196	40.08
Write-in		2	0.41
Total votes		489	100.00

2019 Elizabeth Township Board of Commissioners Republican primary election, Ward 3
Party	Candidate	Votes	%
Republican	Andrew Kuzma (incumbent)	113	86.92
Write-in		17	13.08
Total votes		130	100.00

2019 Elizabeth Township Board of Commissioners Democratic primary election, Ward 3
Party	Candidate	Votes	%
Write-in	Andrew Kuzma	121	51.27
Democratic	William Piper	114	48.31
	Other write-in candidates	1	0.42
Total votes		236	100.00

2019 Elizabeth Township Board of Commissioners election, Ward 3
Party	Candidate	Votes	%
Democratic/Republican	Andrew Kuzma (incumbent)	319	70.73
Write-in		132	29.27
Total votes		451	100.00

2022 Pennsylvania House of Representatives Republican primary election, District 39
Party	Candidate	Votes	%
Republican	Andrew Kuzma	4,308	58.54
Republican	Mike Puskaric (incumbent)	3,032	41.20
Write-in		19	0.26
Total votes		7,359	100.00

2022 Pennsylvania House of Representatives election, District 39
Party	Candidate	Votes	%
Republican	Andrew Kuzma	18,102	59.01
Democratic	Rick Self	12,508	40.78
Write-in		65	0.21
Total votes		30,675	100.00
