= Jefferson Hills, Pennsylvania =

Borough in Pennsylvania, US

- Borough
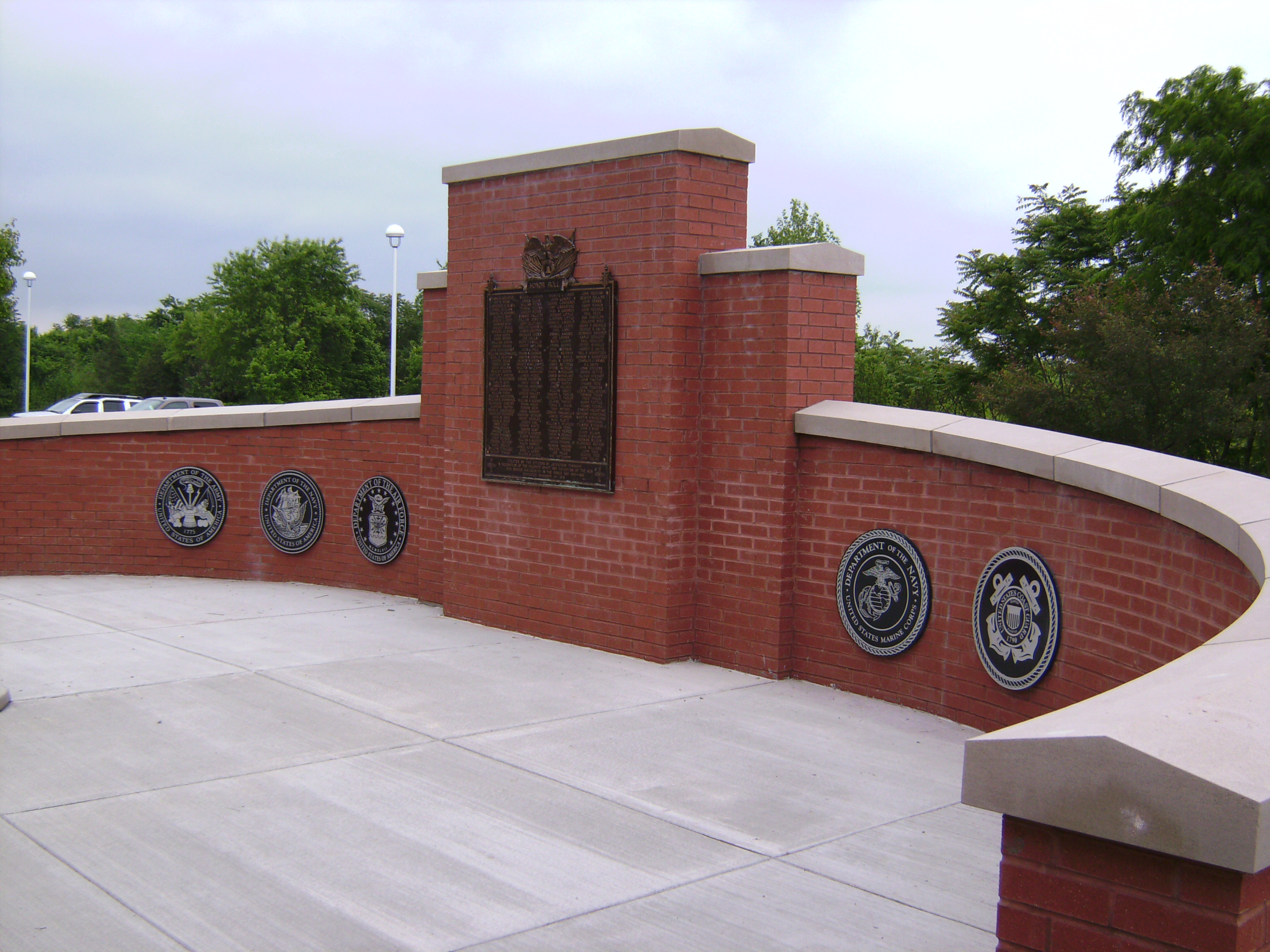
- Jefferson Hills War Memorial

- Location in Allegheny County and the U.S. state of Pennsylvania.
- Coordinates: 40°17′28″N 79°55′55″W
- Country: United States
- State: Pennsylvania
- County: Allegheny County
- Post office: Pittsburgh
- President of Council: Melissa Girman-Steffey

Government
  - Mayor: Carrie McCaffrey

Area
  - Total: 16.75 sq mi (43.38 km^{2})
  - Land: 16.58 sq mi (42.95 km^{2})
  - Water: 0.16 sq mi (0.42 km^{2})

Population (2020)
  - Total: 12,424
  - Density: 749.1/sq mi (289.24/km^{2})
- Time zone: UTC-4 (EST)
  - Summer (DST): UTC-5 (EDT)
- Postal code: 15025
- Area code: 412
- FIPS code: 42-37955
- Website: www.jeffersonhillsboro.org

Jefferson Hills is a borough in Allegheny County, Pennsylvania, United States. In the 2020 census, the population was 12,424. It is part of the Pittsburgh metropolitan area.

Part of the West Jefferson Hills School District, Jefferson Hills was created as Jefferson Township. Incorporated on January 22, 1828, it was named after Thomas Jefferson. Before 1998, the borough was known as simply Jefferson.

== History ==
This borough's history dates back to January 22, 1828, when it was created as a township from the old Township of Mifflin. At that time, the community was named Jefferson Township in honor of President Thomas Jefferson. In 1845, Snowden Township was formed from a part of Jefferson Township. Population of the township in 1860 was 1,601 persons, in 1870 it was 2,066 persons, and it reached a total population of 3,227 persons in 1880 (about equal to the population of 1930). Jefferson Township became a first-class township in 1914, and in 1950 Jefferson was chartered as a borough. The borough of Pleasant Hills seceded from Jefferson Township in 1947 and by so doing, drastically reduced the population and urbanized area of the township.

Jefferson Hills is located along the southern border of Allegheny County and is primarily residential in nature, with approximately one-third of its area presently being used for residential purposes. The residential use is primarily single-family dwellings with slightly over one percent being multiple-family units. Another third of the borough exists in the form of open space and or vacant ground, with the balance being made up of industrial, commercial, mining, and farming land uses.

Present development has occurred almost exclusively in the flat upland areas. These developments are scattered and separated by large open tracts and or hills and valleys.

The area was the geographic base of the Peters Creek Rangers during the Revolutionary War.

== Geography ==
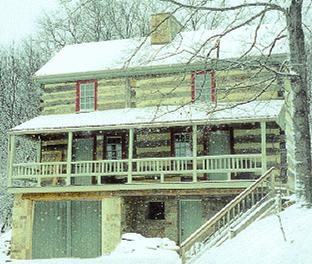
The Oak Noggin Bed & Breakfast

Jefferson Hills is at 40°17′8″N 79°55′59″W (40.285502, −79.933160).

The United States Census Bureau says the borough is 16.6 square miles (43 km^{2}), of which 0.04 square miles (0.10 km^{2}), or 0.24%, is water. The major portion of Jefferson Hills drains into two watersheds, the Peters Creek watershed, which ultimately drains into the Monongahela River at Clairton, and the Calamity Hollow and West Elizabeth watershed, which drains to the Monongahela River in the vicinity of West Elizabeth.

The borough includes rolling hills and woods. The southeastern border is the Monongahela River. Three streams flow through the borough: Peters Creek, Beam Run, and Lewis Run.

=== Climate ===
Climate data for Allegheny County Airport, ~5 mi (8.0 km) to the north-northeast
| Month | Jan | Feb | Mar | Apr | May | Jun | Jul | Aug | Sep | Oct | Nov | Dec | Year |
|---|---|---|---|---|---|---|---|---|---|---|---|---|---|
| Mean daily maximum °F (°C) | 35.8 (2.1) | 39.3 (4.1) | 49.0 (9.4) | 61.6 (16.4) | 70.6 (21.4) | 78.6 (25.9) | 82.4 (28.0) | 81.1 (27.3) | 73.6 (23.1) | 62.6 (17.0) | 50.8 (10.4) | 39.5 (4.2) | 60.5 (15.8) |
| Mean daily minimum °F (°C) | 21.8 (−5.7) | 24.0 (−4.4) | 31.0 (−0.6) | 41.6 (5.3) | 50.7 (10.4) | 59.3 (15.2) | 63.3 (17.4) | 62.5 (16.9) | 55.4 (13.0) | 44.0 (6.7) | 35.7 (2.1) | 26.4 (−3.1) | 43.1 (6.2) |
| Average precipitation inches (mm) | 2.73 (69) | 2.68 (68) | 3.10 (79) | 3.15 (80) | 4.17 (106) | 4.04 (103) | 3.77 (96) | 3.51 (89) | 3.35 (85) | 2.52 (64) | 3.35 (85) | 2.92 (74) | 39.29 (998) |
Source: NOAA

=== Surrounding municipalities ===
Jefferson Hills has six land borders with Pleasant Hills and West Mifflin to the north, Clairton to the east, West Elizabeth to the southeast, Union Township in Washington County to the south, and South Park Township to the west. Across the Monongahela River, Jefferson Hills runs adjacent with Elizabeth Township, Elizabeth Borough and Forward Township.

== Demographics ==
Historical population
| Census | Pop. | Note | %± |
|---|---|---|---|
| 1930 | 4,138 | | — |
| 1940 | 5,585 | | 35.0% |
| 1950 | 5,534 | | −0.9% |
| 1960 | 8,280 | | 49.6% |
| 1970 | 8,512 | | 2.8% |
| 1980 | 8,643 | | 1.5% |
| 1990 | 9,533 | | 10.3% |
| 2000 | 9,666 | | 1.4% |
| 2010 | 10,619 | | 9.9% |
| 2020 | 12,424 | | 17.0% |

=== 2020 census ===
As of the 2020 census, Jefferson Hills had a population of 12,424. The median age was 41.6 years. 22.4% of residents were under the age of 18 and 19.4% of residents were 65 years of age or older. For every 100 females there were 97.3 males, and for every 100 females age 18 and over there were 95.1 males age 18 and over.

98.5% of residents lived in urban areas, while 1.5% lived in rural areas.

There were 4,757 households in Jefferson Hills, of which 31.7% had children under the age of 18 living in them. Of all households, 59.7% were married-couple households, 14.4% were households with a male householder and no spouse or partner present, and 20.7% were households with a female householder and no spouse or partner present. About 23.8% of all households were made up of individuals and 11.1% had someone living alone who was 65 years of age or older.

There were 5,002 housing units, of which 4.9% were vacant. The homeowner vacancy rate was 0.7% and the rental vacancy rate was 7.9%.

Racial composition as of the 2020 census
| Race | Number | Percent |
|---|---|---|
| White | 11,092 | 89.3% |
| Black or African American | 290 | 2.3% |
| American Indian and Alaska Native | 9 | 0.1% |
| Asian | 461 | 3.7% |
| Native Hawaiian and Other Pacific Islander | 1 | 0.0% |
| Some other race | 62 | 0.5% |
| Two or more races | 509 | 4.1% |
| Hispanic or Latino (of any race) | 243 | 2.0% |

=== 2000 census ===
As of the 2000 census, there were 9,666 people, 3,781 households, and 2,688 families residing in the borough. The population density was 583.5 inhabitants per square mile (225.3/km^{2}). There were 3,954 housing units at an average density of 238.7 per square mile (92.2/km^{2}).

The racial makeup of the borough was 96.76% White, 1.31% African American, 0.17% Native American, 1.09% Asian, 0.14% from other races, and 0.53% from two or more races. Hispanic or Latino of any race were 0.69% of the population.

There were 3,781 households, out of which 31.7% had children under the age of 18 living with them, 60.0% were married couples living together, 8.3% had a female householder with no husband present, and 28.9% were non-families. 24.7% of all households were made up of individuals, and 10.3% had someone living alone who was 65 years of age or older. The average household size was 2.51 and the average family size was 3.04.

Within the borough the population was spread out, with 24.0% under the age of 18, 5.8% from 18 to 24, 28.9% from 25 to 44, 24.6% from 45 to 64, and 16.8% who were 65 years of age or older. The median age was 41 years. For every 100 females, there were 91.7 males. For every 100 females age 18 and over, there were 90.1 males.

The median income for a household in the borough was $50,615, and the median income for a family was $60,767. Males had a median income of $43,972 compared with that of $36,052 for females. The per capita income for the borough was $23,006.

Approximately 2.7% of families and 4.1% of the population were living below the poverty line, including 4.6% of those who were under the age of 18 and 5.1% of those who were aged 65 or over.

=== Crime ===
Crime in Jefferson Hills is well below state and national averages. The rates for 2005, based per 100,000 people:

2005 crime rate statistics
| Location | Violent crime | Property crime |
|---|---|---|
| Jefferson Hills | 83 | 784 |
| Pennsylvania | 425 | 2,417 |
| United States | 469 | 3,420 |

== Parks and recreation ==
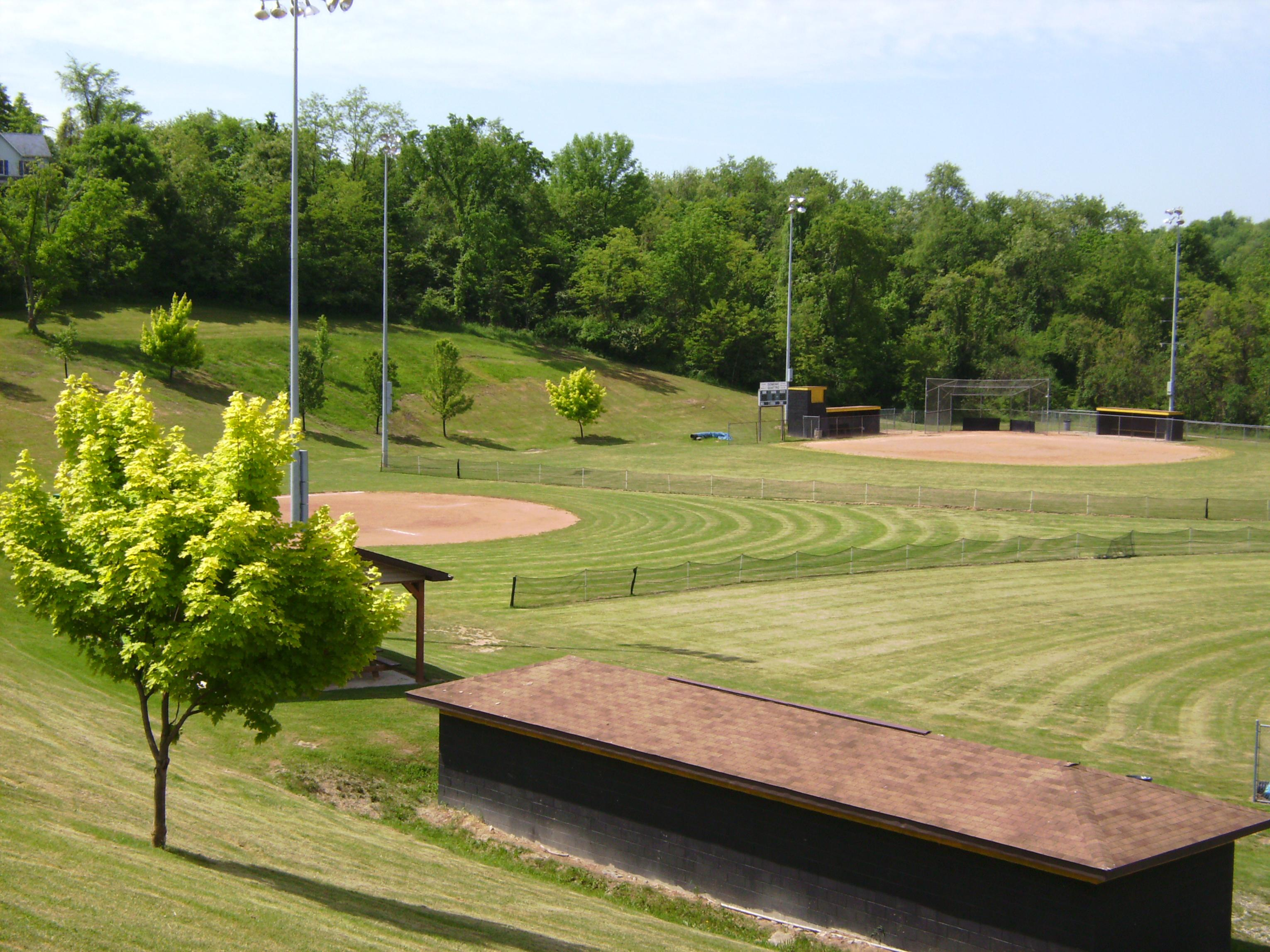
Andrew Reilly Memorial Park

The municipality operates five parks including Gill Hall Park, Andrew Reilly Memorial Park, Lobb's Park, Beedle Park, and Tepe Park spread throughout the community. These parks offer a variety of amenities from various sports fields, tennis and basketball courts, and playground equipment. Additionally, the borough has several pavilions and the Gill Hall Community Center available to rent to borough residents.

The Great Allegheny Passage is a system of biking and hiking trails spanning 150 miles (240 km). These trails run from Cumberland, Maryland, to Pittsburgh. In 2006, the Great Allegheny Passage connected with the C & O Canal Trail to create a 318-mile-long (512 km) journey from Pittsburgh to Washington, D.C. This effort was coordinated by the Allegheny Trail Alliance, an organization of the seven-member trails stretching from Pennsylvania to Maryland.

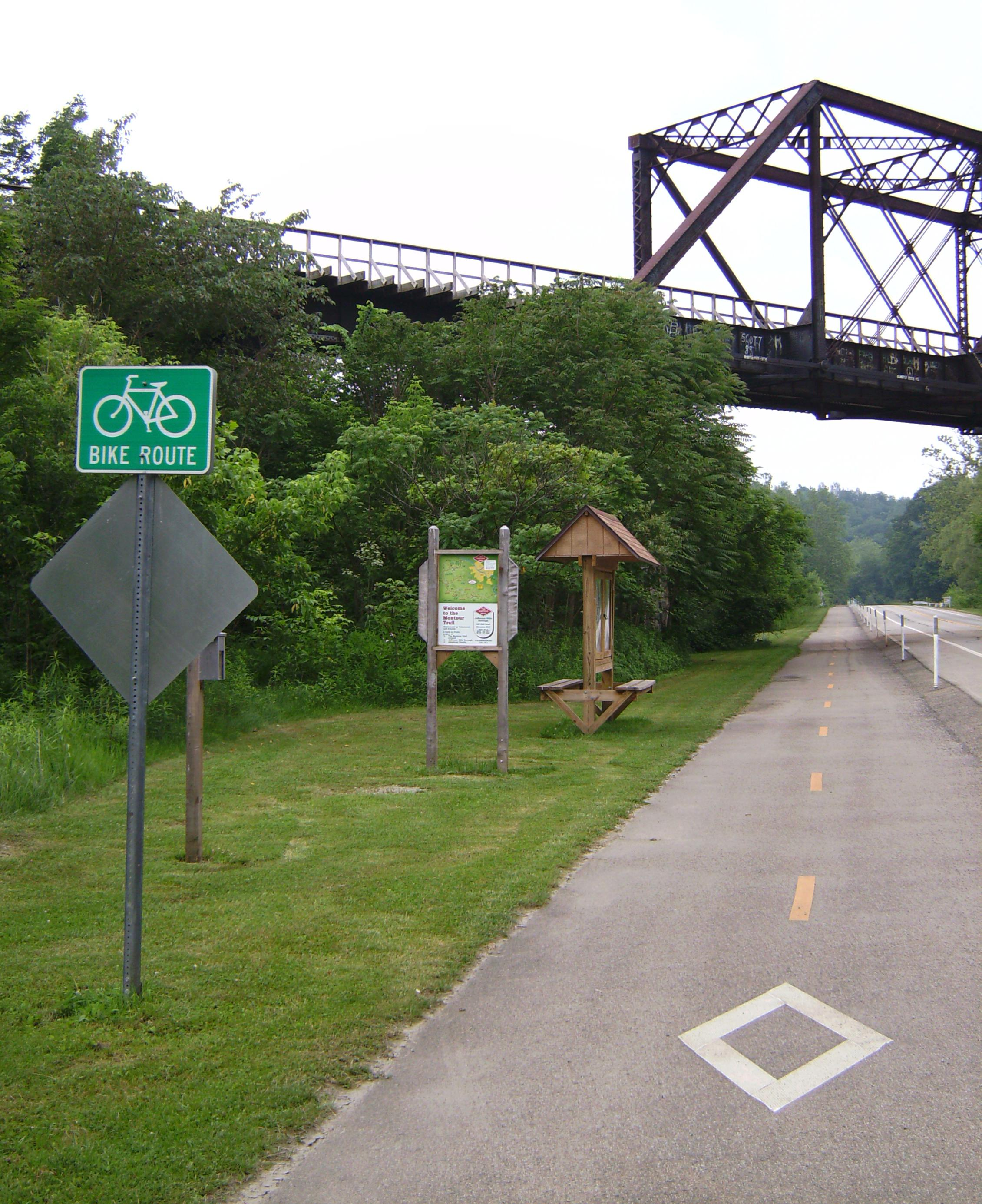
Jefferson Hills Trailhead

Jefferson Hills is uniquely positioned with two members of that Alliance, the Montour Trail and Steel Valley Trail system, intersecting in nearby Clairton. Local trailheads include Triphammer Road, Jefferson Hills (Gill Hall Road), Route 51 - Large, and Clairton trailheads.

The Montour Trail is a multipurpose trail extending 40 miles (60 km) from Coraopolis to Clairton. The trail is made of crushed limestone, making it ideal for biking, walking, and cross-country skiing in the winter. The Montour Trail also connects with the Panhandle Trail, a trail of 29 miles (47 km) trail between Carnegie, Pennsylvania, and Weirton, West Virginia.

The Steel Valley Trail runs 14 miles (23 km) from Clairton through McKeesport to West Homestead. The McKeesport-West Homestead section is part of the GAP trail which connects Washington, D.C., to Pittsburgh solely on bike trails. At the Clairton Trailhead 40°18′19.44″N 79°52′59.14″W it connects to the Montour Trail which is a 40 miles (64 km) loop south of Pittsburgh.

== Government ==
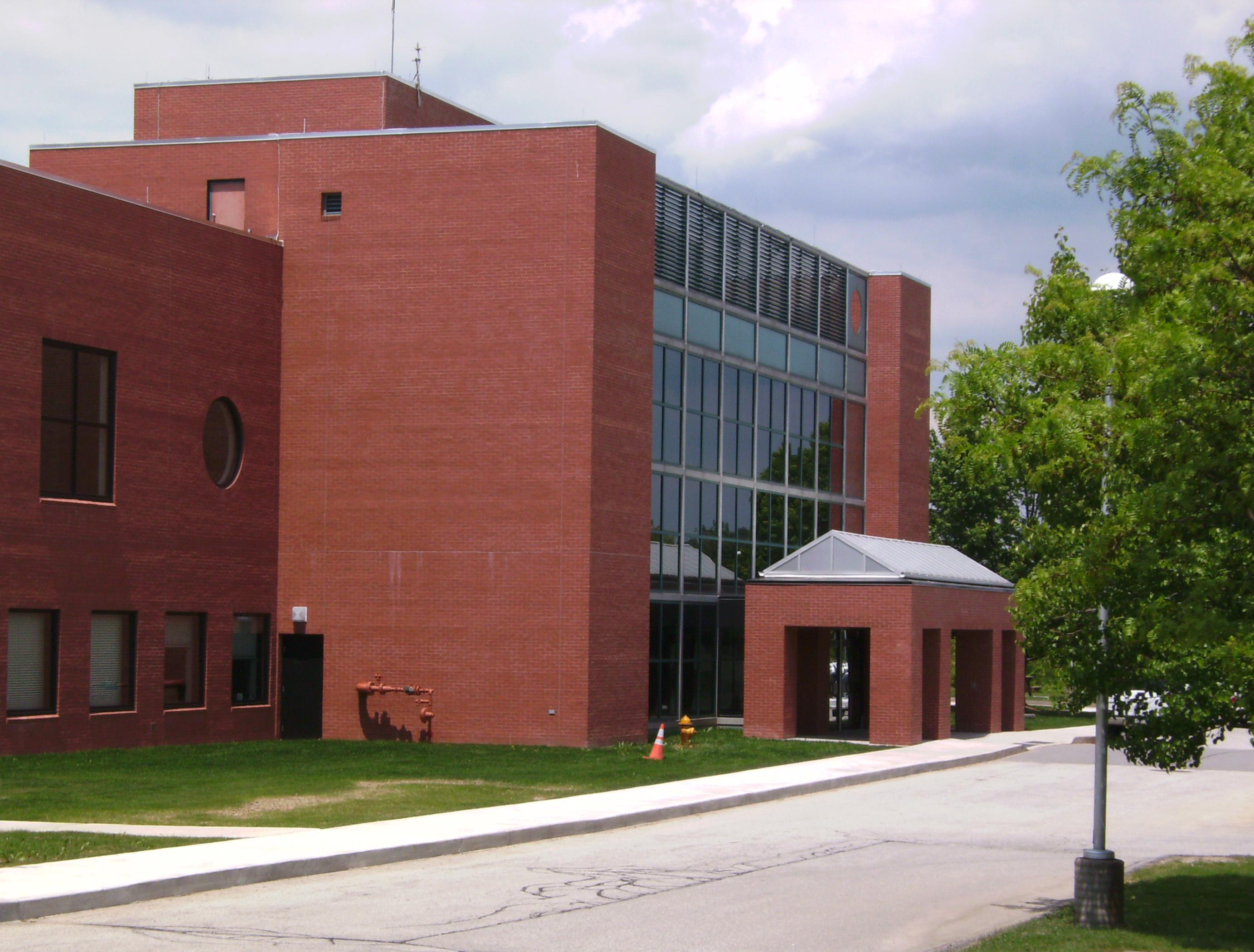
Jefferson Hills Municipal Center

Jefferson Hills is a borough, run by an elected seven-member council and mayor. The administrative staff run by the borough manager runs the borough to the objectives set by the council.

Jefferson Hills is represented by John Fetterman and Bob Casey Jr. in the United States Senate and Summer Lee of the 12th District of Pennsylvania in the House of Representatives. The borough's representative in the Pennsylvania State Senate is Devlin Robinson of the 37th District and Andrew Kuzma of the 39th Legislative District in the Pennsylvania House of Representatives. The District Court judge for Jefferson Hills is Michael Thatcher.

=== Politics ===
Presidential election results
| Year | Republican | Democratic | Third parties |
|---|---|---|---|
| 2020 | 58% 4,344 | 40% 2,981 | 0.8% 64 |
| 2016 | 61% 3,737 | 37% 2,264 | 2% 173 |
| 2012 | 59% 3,272 | 40% 2,229 | 1% 49 |

== Media ==
As with all communities in the Pittsburgh area, Jefferson Hills receives the Pittsburgh Post-Gazette. The borough has two local papers, the South Hills Record and the Union-Finley Messenger.

Jefferson Hills as a member of the Pittsburgh metro area is served by a variety of local television and radio stations. The major network television affiliates are KDKA-TV 2 (CBS), WTAE-TV 4 (ABC), WPXI 11 (NBC), WQED 13 (PBS), WPGH-TV 53 (Fox), WPKD-TV 19 (CW), WINP-TV 16 (Ion), WPNT 22 (MyNetworkTV), and WPCB 40 (Cornerstone). WEPA-CD 16 is an independent station owned and operated by the Bruno-Goodworth Network.

There are a wide variety of radio stations serving the Pittsburgh market. The first was KDKA 1020 AM, which is also the first commercially licensed radio station in the United States, receiving its license on October 27, 1920. Other popular stations include KQV 1410 AM (news), WPGP 1250 AM (conservative talk), WKST-FM 96.1 FM (pop and hip-hop), WBZZ 100.7 FM (adult contemporary), WDVE 102.5 FM (album rock), WPGB 104.7 FM (talk), WXDX 105.9 FM (modern rock), and WAMO 106.7 (hip-hop, rap). There are also three public radio stations in the area; including WESA 90.5 FM (National Public Radio affiliate operated by Duquesne University), WQED 89.3 FM (classical), and WYEP 91.3 FM (adult alternative). Three non-commercial stations are run by Carnegie Mellon University (WRCT 88.3 FM), the University of Pittsburgh (WPTS 92.1 FM), and Point Park University (WPPJ 670 AM).

== Infrastructure ==
=== Transportation ===
Two major roads run through Jefferson Hills, PA Route 51 and PA Route 43. Route 51 runs from Uniontown to the Pennsylvania/Ohio border. In Jefferson Hills Route 51 serves as the terminus for Route 43, otherwise known as the Mon–Fayette Expressway. Route 43 is a toll road and part of the Pennsylvania Turnpike system.

The Port Authority of Allegheny County offers bus services in and around Jefferson Hills. There are several buses that directly pass through the borough, including:

Jefferson Hills bus routes
| Route number | Route map | Schedule | Route description |
|---|---|---|---|
| Y46 - Elizabeth | Route Map | Schedule | Daily radial route via South Busway and Pennsylvania Route 51. |
| Y1 – Large Flyer | Route Map | Schedule | Monday-Friday peak-direction express route via South Busway and Pennsylvania Route 51. |
| 55 – Jefferson | Route Map | Schedule | Daily feeder route with connections in West Mifflin and McKeesport. |

Jefferson Hills is located 45 minutes to the southeast of Pittsburgh International Airport, which handles most air travel in the Pittsburgh metro area. Additionally, the borough is a short drive away from the Allegheny County Airport, located in the neighboring South Hills community of West Mifflin. The Allegheny County Airport serves as the primary FAA-designated reliever airport for Pittsburgh International Airport. In this role the airport supports a high volume of business and corporate-related activity.

=== Utilities ===
Electricity generation in Jefferson Hills is supplied by both West Penn Power and Duquesne Light. Natural gas service for the borough is supplied by Equitable Gas Company. Republic Services handles the trash removal and recycling for Jefferson Hills.

=== Healthcare ===
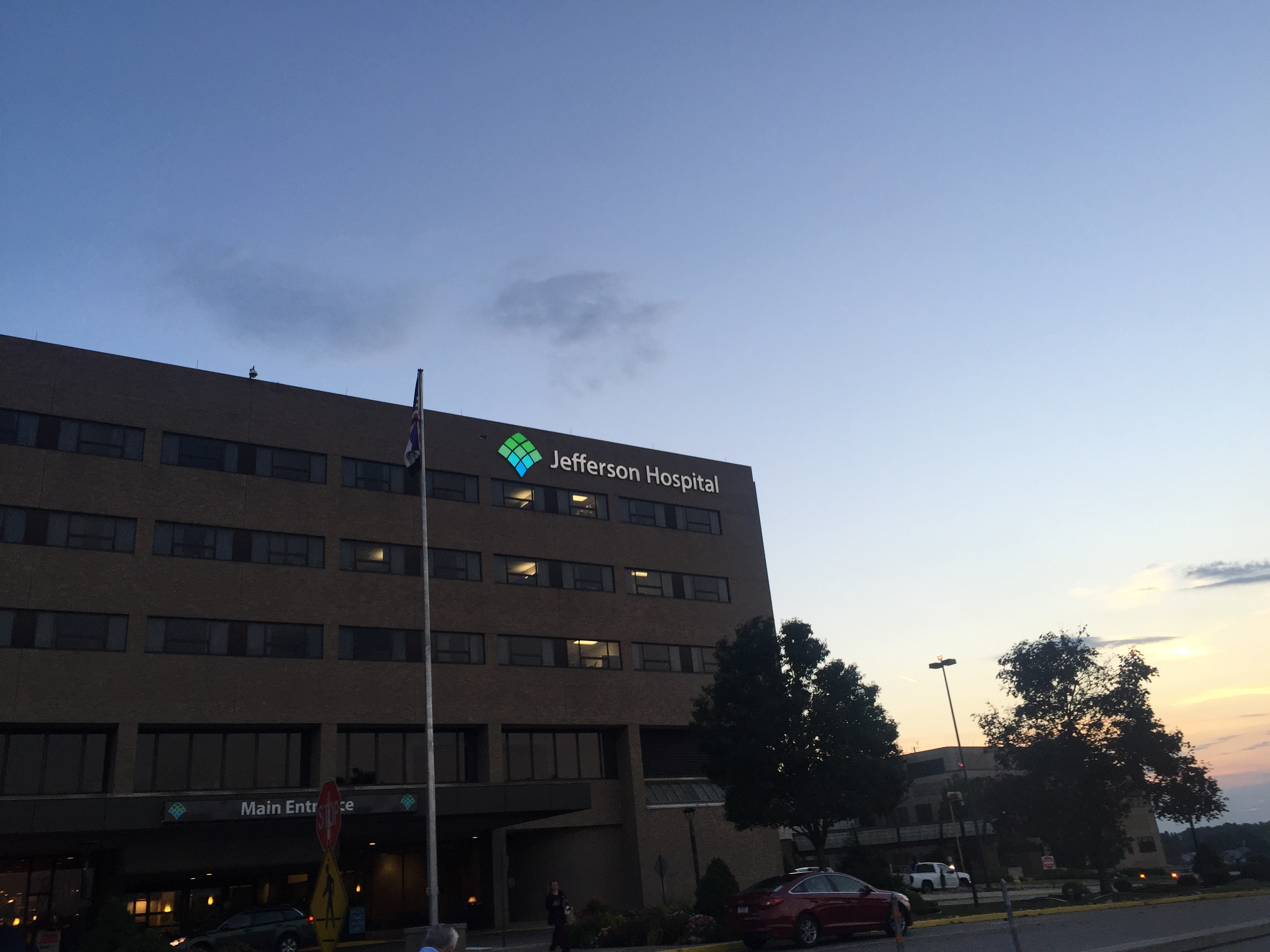
Jefferson Hospital

Jefferson Hills is home to AHN Jefferson Hospital, formerly Jefferson Regional Medical Center, a 373-bed hospital $30 million hospital that opened in the spring of 1977. It serves the South Hills region of Pittsburgh.

=== Safety ===
The Jefferson Hills police department is headquartered in the municipal center. It is staffed by eighteen officers and several community service personnel. The police take part in programs such as Drug Abuse Resistance Education in the West Jefferson Hills School District. The force belongs to TUPPER, in which police from nine nearby communities collaborate, sharing regional criminal information. It also takes part in the Pennsylvania Attorney General's Regional Narcotic Task Force and the South Hills DUI task force.

The borough has emergency management and volunteer firefighters. There are two volunteer fire companies: Floreffe Volunteer Fire Company and Jefferson 885 Fire Company.
