= South Hills (Pennsylvania) =

Suburbs south of Pittsburgh, Pennsylvania

Coordinates: 40.392°N 80.037°W

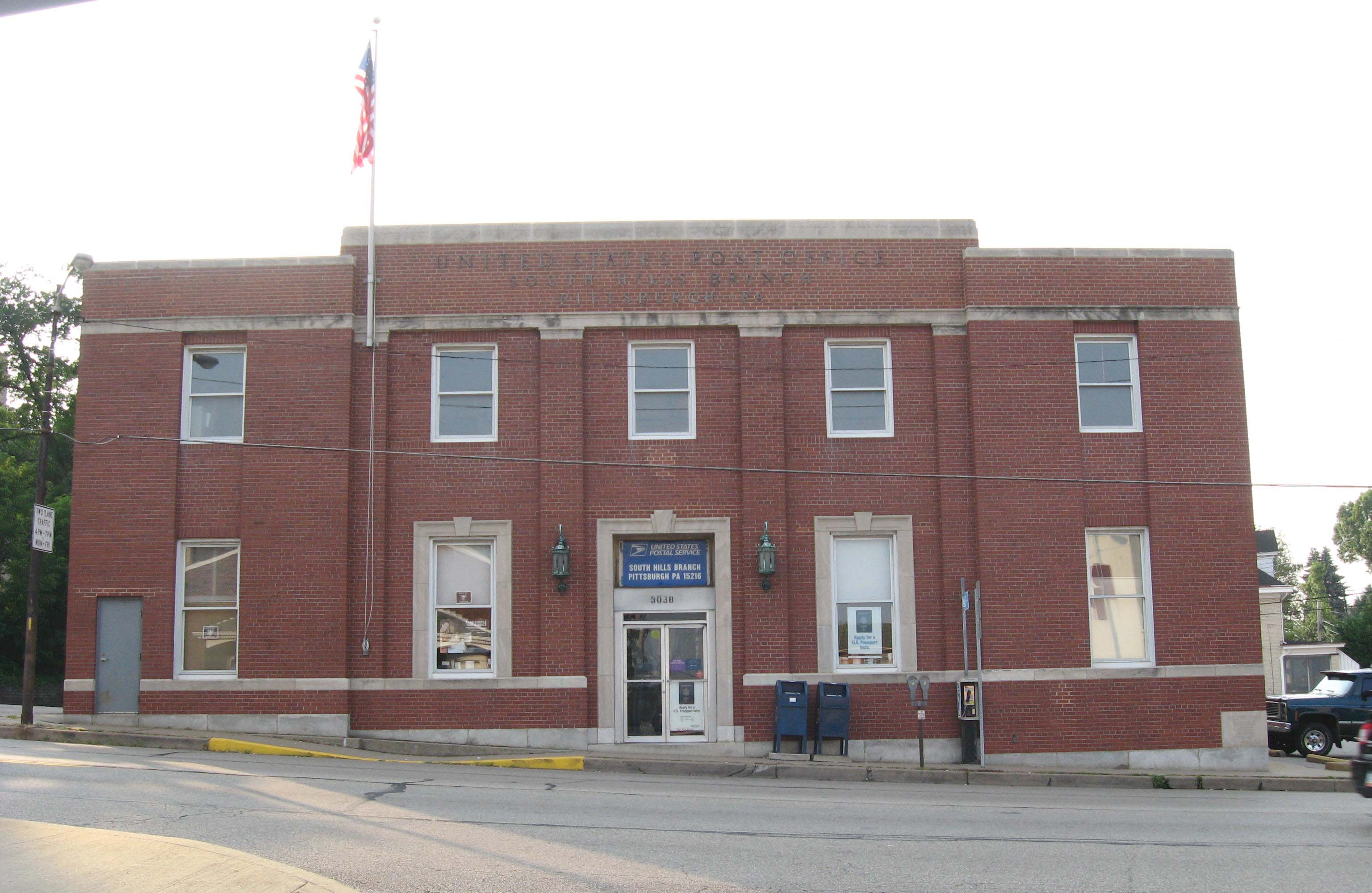
South Hills Post Office, West Liberty Avenue, Dormont, 15216

The South Hills are the inner-ring southern suburbs of Pittsburgh, Pennsylvania, United States. Two of the suburban municipalities that are included in the South Hills outside of Pittsburgh are Bethel Park and Mt. Lebanon, as well as the boroughs of Castle Shannon, Dormont, and Green Tree. The South Hills also includes the townships of Baldwin, Collier, Peters, Scott, South Fayette, South Park, and Upper St. Clair, plus the boroughs of Baldwin (not to be confused with the previously mentioned township of Baldwin), Brentwood, Bridgeville, Carnegie, Heidelberg, Jefferson Hills, Mount Oliver, Pleasant Hills, West Mifflin, and Whitehall. All of these places are located within Allegheny County, except for Peters Township, which is located in bordering Washington County. Much of the South Hills was originally a land grant to John Ormsby.

Suburban and exurban municipalities located even further south, such as North Strabane, are not typically considered part of this region. Suburban municipalities bordering the Monongahela River but more northern or eastern from the rest of the South Hills area, such as West Elizabeth and Whitaker, are also not typically considered part of this region.

== Transportation ==
Major roads in this area include U.S. Route 19 (and it's truck route), Brownsville Road, Pennsylvania Route 50, Pennsylvania Route 51, Pennsylvania Route 88 and Pennsylvania Route 121. Pittsburgh Regional Transit also operates a light rail system that connects several communities in the South Hills with downtown Pittsburgh and the North Shore.

== Development ==
South Hills High School in Mt. Washington was closed in 1987. In 2007, developers submitted plans to convert the site into apartments marketed towards senior citizens.

== School districts ==
- Baldwin-Whitehall School District
  - Serving the boroughs of Baldwin and Whitehall, and the township of Baldwin, as well as a portion of the Hays neighborhood of Pittsburgh.
- Bethel Park School District
  - Serving the municipality of Bethel Park, as well as a portion of the borough of Castle Shannon.
- Brentwood Borough School District
  - Serving the borough of Brentwood.
- Carlynton School District
  - Serving the boroughs of Carnegie, Crafton, and Rosslyn Farms.
- Chartiers Valley School District
  - Serving the boroughs of Bridgeville and Heidelberg, and the townships of Collier and Scott.
- Keystone Oaks School District
  - Serving the boroughs of Castle Shannon, Dormont, and Green Tree.
- Mt. Lebanon School District
  - Serving the municipality of Mt. Lebanon.
- Peters Township School District
  - Serving the township of Peters.
- Pittsburgh Public Schools
  - Serving the city of Pittsburgh, as well as the borough of Mount Oliver.
- South Fayette Township School District
  - Serving the township of South Fayette.
- South Park School District
  - Serving the township of South Park.
- Upper St. Clair School District
  - Serving the township of Upper St. Clair.
- West Jefferson Hills School District
  - Serving the boroughs of Pleasant Hills and West Elizabeth, and the township of Jefferson Hills.
- West Mifflin Area School District
  - Serving the borough of West Mifflin, as well as the borough of Whitaker.
