= Lou Spanos =

American football player and coach (born 1971)

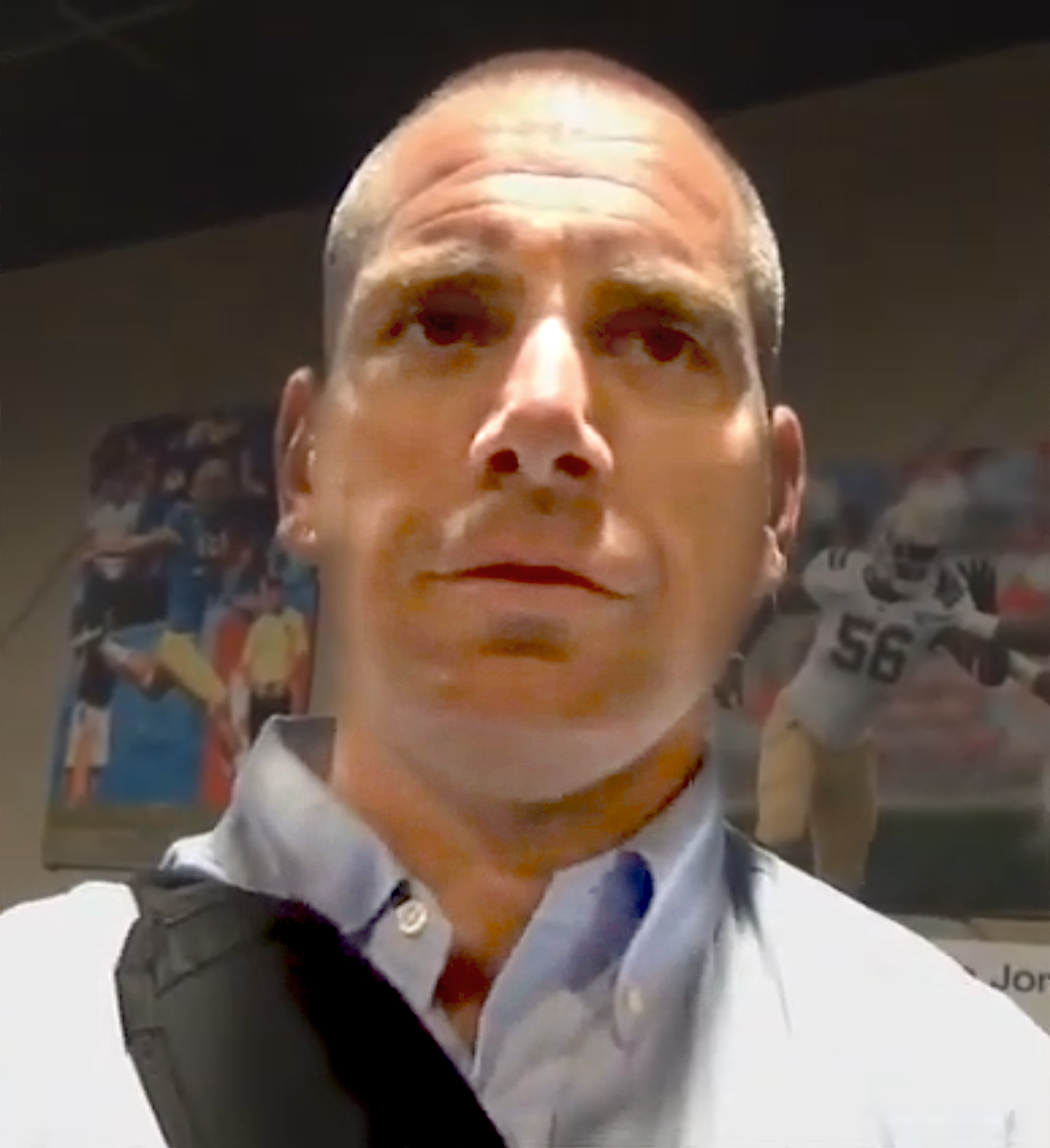
- Spanos in 2012

LSU Tigers
- Title: Assistant Defensive Line and Pass Rush Specialist

Personal information
- Born: March 27, 1971 (age 55)

Career information
- High school: Keystone Oaks (Pittsburgh, Pennsylvania)
- College: Tulsa

Career history
- Tulsa (1993) Student assistant; Pittsburgh Steelers (1995–2009) Defensive quality control and assistant linebackers coach; Washington Redskins (2010–2011) Linebackers coach; UCLA (2012–2013) Defensive coordinator; Tennessee Titans (2014–2017) Linebackers coach; Alabama (2018) Analyst; UConn (2019–2021) Defensive coordinator; UConn (2021) Interim head coach; Ole Miss (2023–2025) Defensive analyst; LSU (2026–present) Assistant Defensive Line and Pass Rush Specialist

Awards and highlights
- 2× Super Bowl champion (XL, XLIII); Pac-12 South Division champions (2012)

Head coaching record
- Career: 1–9 (college)

Louis G. Spanos (born March 27, 1971) is an American college football coach. He is an Assistant Defensive Line and Pass Rush Specialist for the Louisiana State University, a position he has held since 2026. He was the interim head football coach for the University of Connecticut in 2021. He also coached in the National Football League (NFL) as a defensive quality control and assistant linebackers coach for the Pittsburgh Steelers from 1995 to 2009, the linebackers coach for the Washington Redskins from 2010 to 2011, and served as the defensive coordinator for UCLA from 2012 to 2013.

Throughout his career, Spanos has been to the Super Bowl three times, winning two of them with the Pittsburgh Steelers in 2006 and 2009, and had been to the College Football Playoff National Championship once; in 2019 with Alabama.

== Playing career ==
Spanos attended Keystone Oaks High School, located in the South Hills suburbs of Pittsburgh, Pennsylvania, and played in the 1989 Big 33 Football Classic. A 1994 graduate of the University of Tulsa, Spanos was a four-year letterman and three-year starter at center. He served as the center for Tulsa quarterback Gus Frerotte.

== Coaching career ==
Spanos stayed at Tulsa for a year after his playing career concluded to assist coaching the linebackers. He joined the Steelers in 1995. Spanos is one of only two assistant coaches to be on the Super Bowl XXX, Super Bowl XL and Super Bowl XLIII coaching staffs, joining defensive line coach John Mitchell.

On January 16, 2010, Spanos was hired by Mike Shanahan and the Washington Redskins to be their linebackers coach. After the 2011 season, he left the Redskins to coach the UCLA Bruins defense. On January 18, 2014, Spanos left the Bruins and was hired by Ken Whisenhunt of the Tennessee Titans as linebackers coach.

On September 5, 2021, Huskies head coach Randy Edsall announced plans to retire at the end of the 2021 season; a day later, UConn announced that Edsall would step down immediately as a result of a "mutual decision" between him and the university. Spanos was named the interim head coach for the remainder of the season.

Spanos resigned as defensive coordinator at UConn in August 2022, two weeks before the beginning of the football season.

== Head coaching record ==
Year	Team	Overall	Conference	Standing	Bowl/playoffs
UConn Huskies (NCAA Division I FBS independent) (2021)
2021	UConn	1–9 (Note: Served as interim head coach after Randy Edsall stepped down on September 6.)			
UConn:		1–9			
Total:		1–9			

== Personal life ==
As of 2021, Spanos and his wife reside in Mount Pleasant, South Carolina with their three children.
