= Banksville (Pittsburgh) =

- Neighborhood of Pittsburgh
- Coordinates: 40.412°N 80.039°W
- Country: United States
- State: Pennsylvania
- County: Allegheny County
- City: Pittsburgh

Area
  - Total: 0.969 sq mi (2.51 km^{2})

Population (2010)
  - Total: 4,144
  - Density: 4,280/sq mi (1,650/km^{2})

Banksville is a neighborhood in Pittsburgh, Pennsylvania (20th ward). The neighborhood of Banksville is located in the West End of the city and borders the South Hills region. Real estate agencies frequently refer to the Banksville area as Greentree City due to Banksville's shared border with the borough of Green Tree. It has two zip codes of both 15220 and 15216, and has representation in Pittsburgh City Council by the council member for District 2 (West Neighborhoods). Theresa Kail-Smith is the current Councilperson for district two. Banksville's primary corridor, Banksville Road, is frequently used as a gateway between the South Hills of Pittsburgh and downtown Pittsburgh via the Fort Pitt Tunnels. Banksville, formerly Union Township, joined the City of Pittsburgh around 1928.

Historical population
Year	Pop.	±%
1940	1,214	—
1950	1,328	+9.4%
1960	2,641	+98.9%
1970	4,927	+86.6%
1980	3,831	−22.2%
1990	4,769	+24.5%
2000	4,540	−4.8%
2010	4,144	−8.7%
2020	4,127	−0.4%
Source: University of Pittsburgh WPRDC

== History ==
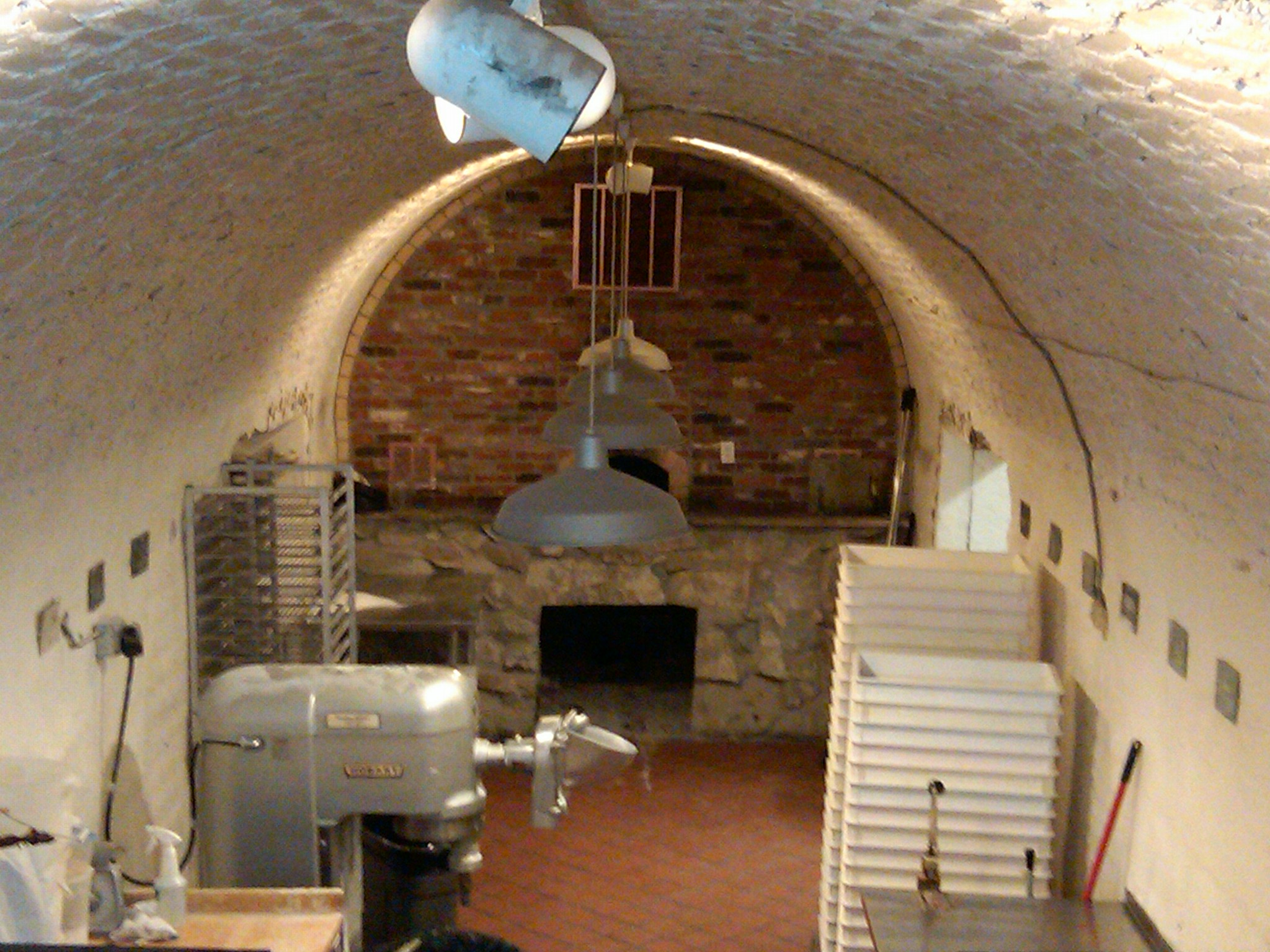
Former coal mine entrance

The first known European inhabitant of Banksville was Isaac Sellers, who settled in the area in 1773. According to the "History of Allegheny County", "the earliest settlers were subjected to frequent alarms by marauding Indians." Shortly after his settlement, he was joined by James Kearns and William Chess, both from Ireland. The 400-acre (1.6 km^{2}) land, known as "The Experiment" and located on the waters of Little Saw-Mill Run, was sold in 1784 to David and Agnes Carnahan of Ireland. Just before David's death, 250 acres (1.0 km^{2}) of the land was split between David's 3 children—William, Alexander and Joseph. The land was named Banksville by Alexander Carnahan (1789–1879) in honor of the family of his second wife — Eliza Banks.

Alexander Carnahan laid out Banksville just after the Civil War. The town was a farming community as well as a prosperous mining town whose settlers were mostly Scotch-Irish.

The Little Saw Mill Run Railroad, owned by the Harmony Society, was operated between Banksville and the West End beginning in April 1853.

Banksville was formerly a part of Union Township before being annexed into the city of Pittsburgh in 1907.

Banksville Related Mining activities: Coal Ridge Mine; Venture Mine, operated by Gray and Bell; Enterprise Mine, operated by Hartley and Marshall; Pittsburgh, Carnegie and Western Railroad; Westside Belt Railroad Company.

== Community organizations ==
- Banksville Civic Association

== City Steps ==
The Banksville neighborhood has 5 distinct flights of city steps - all of which are open and in a safe condition. In Banksville, the public stairways in Pittsburgh quickly connect pedestrians to public transportation and many businesses along Banksville Road.

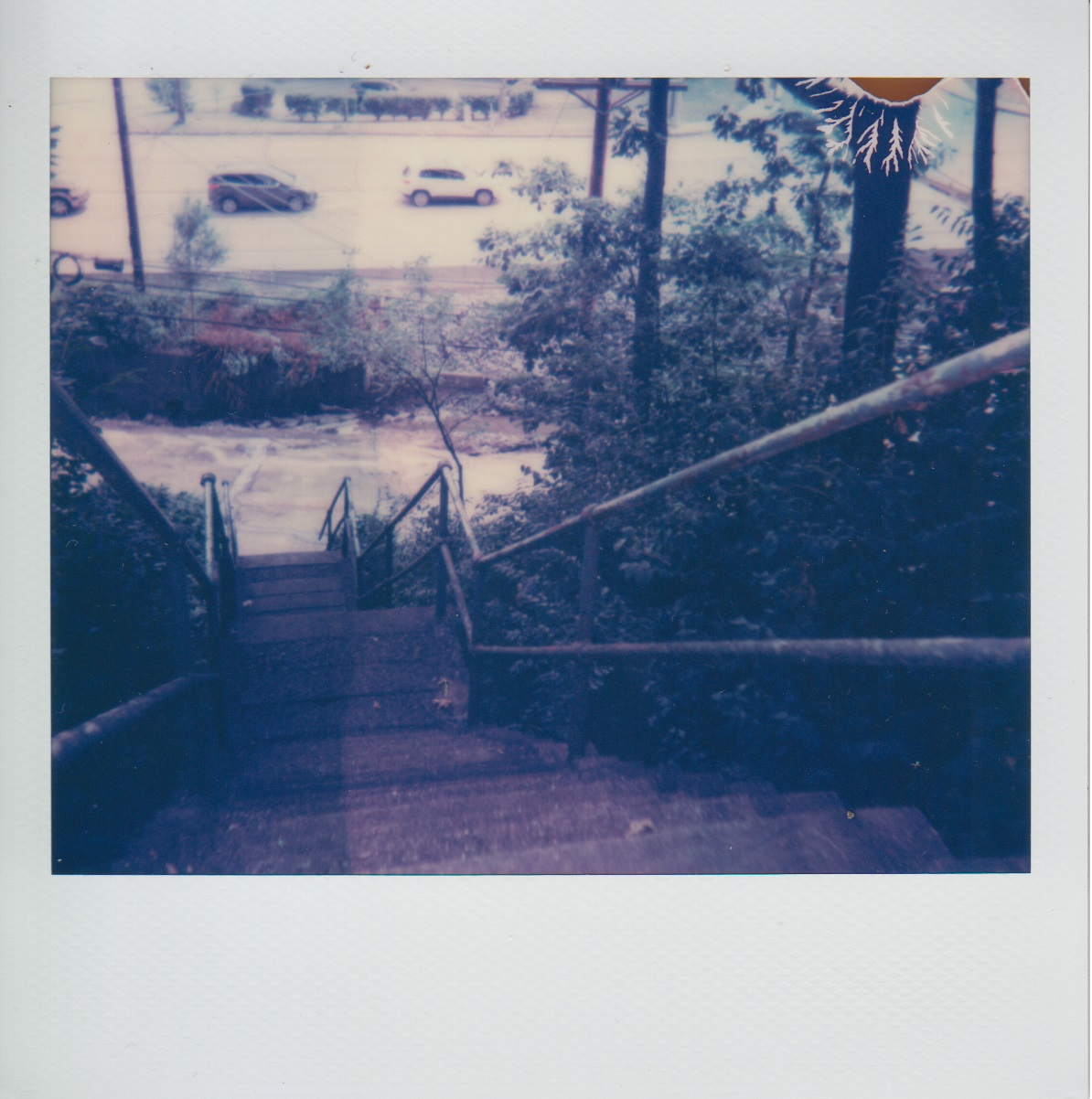
The Anise Way city steps in the Banksville neighborhood of Pittsburgh, PA.

== Recreation ==
Residents have convenient access to the Banksville park, operated by the Pittsburgh Citiparks. The park features a playground, swimming pool, tennis courts, basketball court, batting cages, and ballfield.

== Surrounding communities ==
Banksville has five borders, including the Pittsburgh neighborhoods of Ridgemont to the north and Beechview to the east, the boroughs of Dormont to the south and Green Tree to the west, and the municipality of Mt. Lebanon to the southwest.

== See also ==
- List of Pittsburgh neighborhoods
