= Saint Anne School (Pennsylvania) =

Coordinates: 40.3614°N 80.0295°W

Location
- 4040 Willow Ave Castle Shannon, Pennsylvania; United States

Information
- Motto: An Education for Total Development of the Child – Body, Mind, and Soul
- Established: 1894
- Principal: Mrs. Harmony Stewart
- Chaplain: Father Michael A. Caridi
- Colors: Red and White
- Mascot: Cyclones
- Accreditation: NCEA - Middle States Accreditation - Middle School Association, State and Diocesan Certified Faculty
- Website: Official website

Saint Anne School was a Catholic private elementary school located in Castle Shannon, Pennsylvania, US. It was part of a parish in the Roman Catholic Diocese of Pittsburgh. This school was closed by the Diocese of Pittsburgh following the 2019-2020 school year.

== History ==
Founded in 1894, Saint Anne School was first housed in the Saint Anne Church building in Pittsburgh, Pennsylvania and initially known as the Sacristy School. Moving into a one-room schoolhouse that same year, Miss Flora Shafer taught the first class of 15 students. Subsequent classes were then taught by Sr. Bernard Murphy. Five years later, the school was more fully staffed, drawing its faculty from the Sisters of St. Agnes. By 1905, students were receiving their instruction from the Sisters of Divine Providence in the same building, which by 1912 had been expanded from one room to three floors. More than four decades later, the student body numbered 800 with peak enrollment achieved at more than 1,600 during the 1960s. They were taught by 32 faculty, 21 of whom were members of the Sisters of Divine Providence. The building principal between 1957 and 1963 was Sr. Concepta.

With an average enrollment of 80 students per grade level during the 1970s, facilities were once again expanded during that decade with Rita Adams, CDP serving as the school's principal until 1990. Cathy Jakubowski then became only the second layperson in the school's history to become the institution's principal. The principal as of 2019 was Mrs. Harmony Stewart.

== Notable faculty and alumni ==
- Daniel DiNardo, who was appointed a cardinal.
- Dennis Miller, who became a comedian and talk show host.
