= Lindermer station =

Lindermer
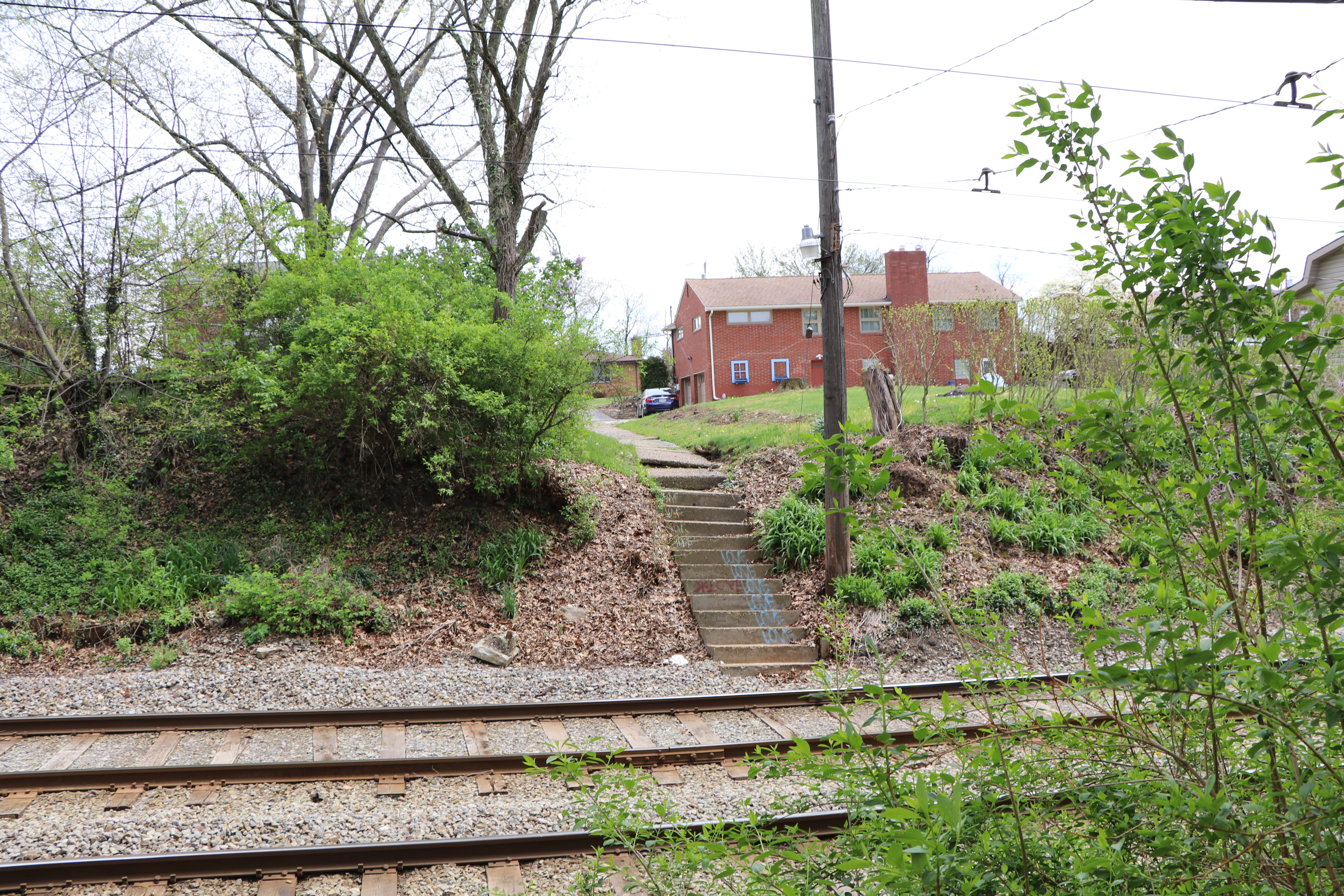
- Station site in 2017. Platforms and crossing have been removed.

General information
- Location: Next to Lindermer Avenue; Bethel Park, Pennsylvania
- Coordinates: 40.3422°N 80.0287°W
- Owner: Port Authority
- Tracks: 2

Construction
- Structure type: Street level
- Parking: No

History
- Closed: June 25, 2012
- Rebuilt: –May 22, 1987

Former services
Preceding station	Port Authority of Allegheny County	Following station
Hillcrest toward Allegheny	Blue Line Library	Center toward Library
Location

Lindermer was a station on the Port Authority of Allegheny County's light rail network, located in Bethel Park, Pennsylvania. The street level stop was designed as a small commuter stop, serving area residents who walked to the train so they could be taken toward Downtown Pittsburgh.

Lindermer was one of eleven stops closed on June 25, 2012, as part of a system-wide consolidation effort.
