= BPSD =

BPSD may refer to:

- Behavioural and psychological symptoms of dementia
- Barrels per stream day, unit of oil production rate commonly used in a regions using the oil barrel of 42 US gallons (159 litres)
- Bethel Park School District
