= Dormont, Pennsylvania =

Borough in Pennsylvania, US

- Borough
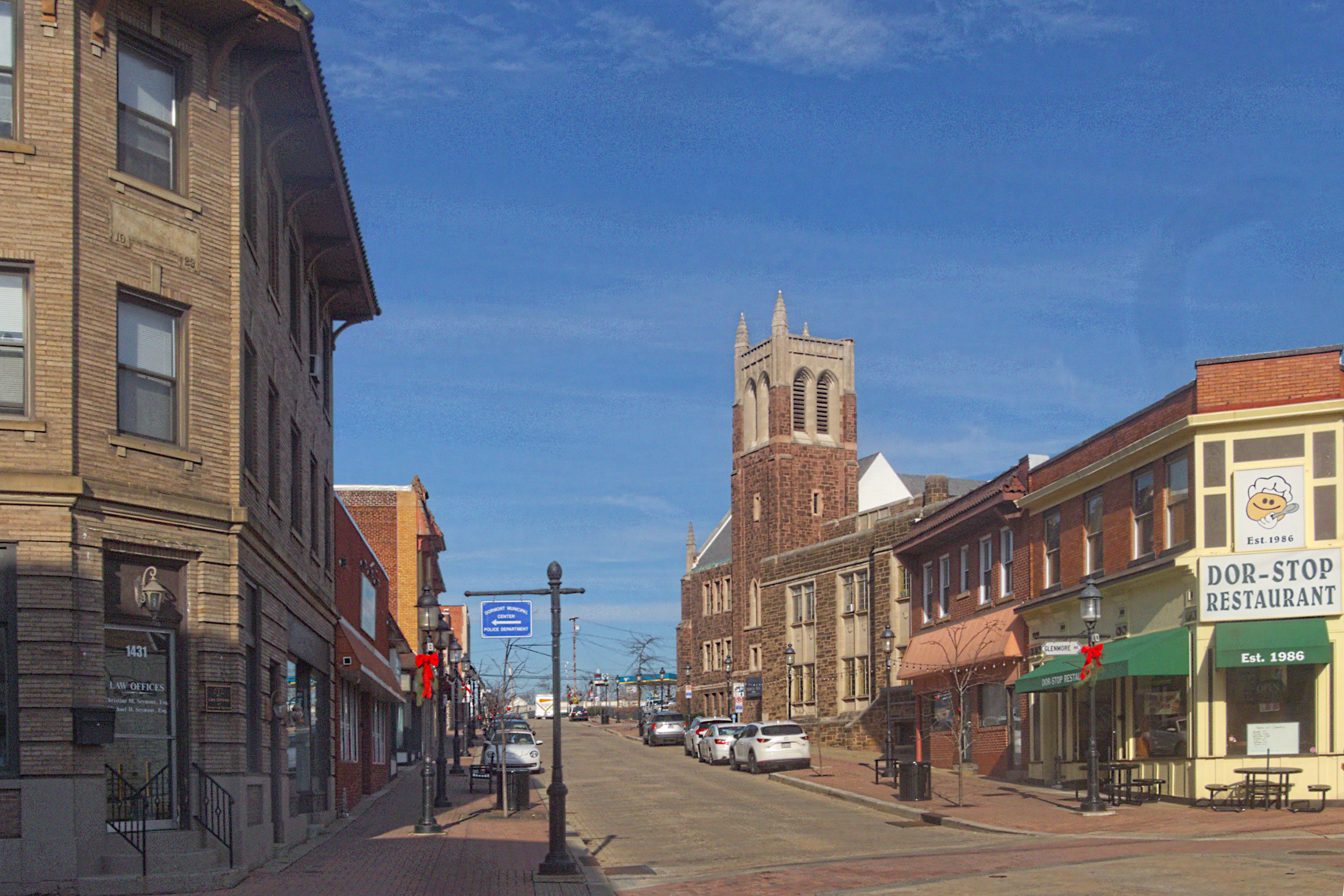
- Potomac Avenue, Dormont

- Location in Allegheny County and the U.S. state of Pennsylvania.
- Coordinates: 40°23′37″N 80°2′15″W
- Country: United States
- State: Pennsylvania
- County: Allegheny

Government
  - Type: Council-Manager
  - Borough Council: List Council Members: President Amie Downs; V.P. Chris Kipp; Pres Pro Temp Daniele Ventresca; Kate Fabus; Shawn Melvin; Joshua Munson; Chris Rieger
  - Mayor: Jason Walsh
  - Borough Manager: John Stinner

Area
  - Total: 0.76 sq mi (1.97 km^{2})
  - Land: 0.76 sq mi (1.97 km^{2})
  - Water: 0 sq mi (0.00 km^{2})

Population (2020)
  - Total: 8,244
  - Density: 10,841.7/sq mi (4,186.02/km^{2})
- Demonym: Dormonster
- Time zone: UTC−5 (Eastern (EST))
  - Summer (DST): UTC−4 (EDT)
- ZIP Code: 15216
- Area code: 412
- FIPS code: 42-19576
- Website: www.boro.dormont.pa.us

Dormont is a borough in Allegheny County, Pennsylvania, United States. The population was 8,244 at the 2020 census. It is a residential suburb located in the South Hills region of the Pittsburgh metropolitan area.

== History ==
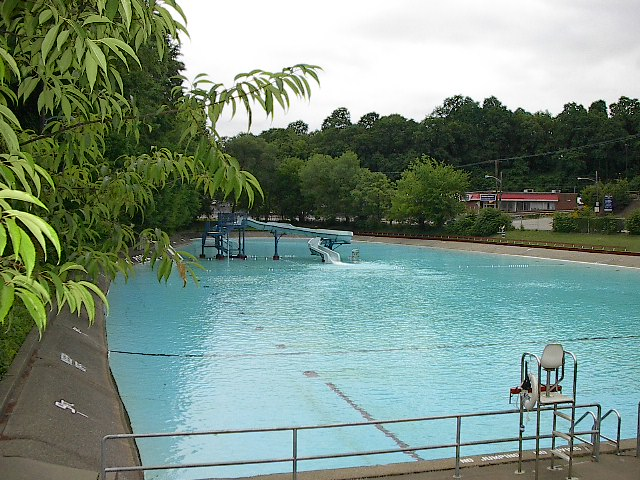
The Dormont Pool celebrated its 100th anniversary in 2020.

The territory in which Dormont Borough is situated was held by the Delaware and Shawnee tribes until 1768, when the territory was part of the transaction in which Fort Stanwix was purchased from the Six Nations. In following years, Dormont's area was part of Cumberland County, Pitt Township in Bedford County, Penn Township in Washington County, and finally, St. Clair Township in Allegheny County in 1788.

Dormont was originally fashioned from parts of Scott and Union Townships. An order of incorporation was signed on March 31, 1909, making Dormont the first independent municipality in the South Hills of Allegheny County. Municipal officials initially wanted to name the new community "Mt. Lebanon"; however, objections were raised by their as yet unincorporated neighbors to the south, who eventually adopted the name. Instead, the name Dormont was chosen from the Americanized version of the French term "mont d'or", loosely translated as "Mountain of Gold."

The first election of borough officials was held on April 27, 1909. Dormont later annexed part of Scott Township in 1909, two additional parts of Union Township in 1913 and 1916, and a portion of Mt. Lebanon Township in January 1921, giving it a total area of just less than one square mile. With the construction of the streetcar tunnel and the Liberty Tunnels came rapid growth.

Once the borough of Dormont was incorporated in 1909, at least 30 different streets were given new names. Today, all but two of Dormont's "side streets" are designated as avenues, the exceptions being Memorial Drive and Park Blvd. Two of Dormont's mainline streets, Scott Road and McFarland Road, are two-lane "borough line" streets in which one lane is located in Dormont and the other in Mt. Lebanon. The northern stretch of another "borough line" street, McNeilly Avenue, runs through Dormont on one side and the Pittsburgh neighborhood of Brookline on the other. Before the incorporation and street name changes, Dormont actually had four designated "streets": Beech St. (Dwight Ave.), Sycamore St. (Philadelphia Ave.), Sylvester St. (Texas Ave.) and "C" St. (Miles Ave.).

In June 2020, the Dormont Borough Council approved a comprehensive plan for the next ten years, which includes provisions for land use, housing, transportation, economic development, parks and recreation, community facilities, historic preservation, sustainability, and public engagement. The council also adopted a $9.8 million budget for 2021 without a tax increase for residents. The Keystone Oaks School District, after a stint of fully remote learning, resumed in-person instruction for all students starting in February 2021.

== Geography ==
Dormont is located in Southwestern Pennsylvania, in Allegheny County, approximately 4 miles (6.4 km) south of the county seat of Pittsburgh. Dormont's map coordinates are:40°23′37″N 80°2′15″W (40.393646, -80.037466). According to the United States Census Bureau, the borough has a total area of 0.7 square miles (1.8 km^{2}), all land.

=== Surrounding communities ===
Dormont has four borders, including the Pittsburgh neighborhoods of Banksville to the north, Beechview to the northeast and Brookline to the east. The remainder of Dormont is bordered by Mt. Lebanon to the south and west.

== Demographics ==
=== Racial and ethnic composition ===
Dormont, Pennsylvania – Racial and ethnic composition Note: the US Census treats Hispanic/Latino as an ethnic category. This table excludes Latinos from the racial categories and assigns them to a separate category. Hispanics/Latinos may be of any race.
Race / Ethnicity (NH = Non-Hispanic)	Pop 2000	Pop 2010	Pop 2020	% 2000	% 2010	% 2020
White alone (NH)	8,870	7,946	7,189	95.33%	92.47%	87.20%
Black or African American alone (NH)	98	180	260	1.05%	2.09%	3.15%
Native American or Alaska Native alone (NH)	16	6	3	0.17%	0.07%	0.04%
Asian alone (NH)	147	131	177	1.58%	1.52%	2.15%
Native Hawaiian or Pacific Islander alone (NH)	5	0	3	0.05%	0.00%	0.04%
Other race alone (NH)	1	18	23	0.01%	0.21%	0.28%
Mixed race or Multiracial (NH)	69	98	263	0.74%	1.14%	3.19%
Hispanic or Latino (any race)	99	214	326	1.06%	2.49%	3.95%
Total	9,305	8,593	8,244	100.00%	100.00%	100.00%

Historical population
Census	Pop.	Note	%±
1910	1,115		—
1920	6,455		478.9%
1930	13,190		104.3%
1940	12,974		−1.6%
1950	13,405		3.3%
1960	13,098		−2.3%
1970	12,856		−1.8%
1980	11,275		−12.3%
1990	9,772		−13.3%
2000	9,305		−4.8%
2010	8,593		−7.7%
2020	8,244		−4.1%

As of the 2000 census, there were 9,305 people, 4,089 households, and 2,314 families residing in the borough. The population density was 12,563.3 inhabitants per square mile (4,850.7/km^{2}). There were 4,287 housing units at an average density of 5,788.2 units per square mile (2,234.8 units/km^{2}). The racial makeup of the borough was 96.08% White, 1.05% African American, 0.17% Native American, 1.63% Asian, 0.05% Pacific Islander, 0.19% from other races, and 0.82% from two or more races. Hispanic or Latino of any race were 1.06% of the population.

There were 4,089 households, out of which 25.1% had children under the age of 18 living with them, 41.6% were married couples living together, 11.7% had a female householder with no husband present, and 43.4% were non-families. 36.0% of all households were made up of individuals, and 10.9% had someone living alone who was 65 years of age or older. The average household size was 2.27 and the average family size was 3.05.

In the borough the population was spread out, with 21.3% under the age of 18, 9.3% from 18 to 24, 34.6% from 25 to 44, 20.8% from 45 to 64, and 14.1% who were 65 years of age or older. The median age was 36 years. For every 100 females, there were 89.4 males. For every 100 females aged 18 and over, there were 85.0 males.

The median income for a household in the borough was $38,958, and the median income for a family was $51,826. Males had a median income of $36,286 versus $27,241 for females. The per capita income for the borough was $20,520. About 4.8% of families and 8.1% of the population were below the poverty line, including 11.2% of those under age 18 and 6.5% of those age 65 or over.

== Arts and culture ==
Through the years, the convenience of the borough, plus the amenities offered its residents, has kept it densely populated. Its citizens enjoy one of the largest swimming pools in Pennsylvania (>60,000 square feet), two parks, basketball and tennis courts, including a flex tennis-pickleball court, two Little League fields, a library, a volunteer-built children's playground, as well as seasonal activities for both children and adults. "Dormont Day," the annual Fourth of July park-wide event, is the highlight of the summer season and features all day family entertainment beginning with the 8:00 a.m. Twenty-One Gun Salute and culminating with one of the most spectacular fireworks displays for a community of this size. During the day, park goers are treated to live music, picnics, food booths, games, pony rides, and youth foot races. In the fall, Dormont hosts the Dormont Street and Music Festival, featuring two stages of bands playing a variety of music from 2:00 - 10:00 PM.

Dormont is home to one of the largest municipal pools in Pennsylvania and hosts several community events throughout the year, including Dormont Day, Dormont Street Fair & Music Festival, and Dormont Winter Festival & Light Up Night.

Organizations such as the Dormont Historical Society, the Dormont Library, the Dormont Arts & Culture Committee, and the Dormont Community Development Corporation work to promote and preserve the culture of Dormont. Annual events like Dormont Pride, Dormont Ethnic Food Festival, and Dormont Multicultural Day celebrate its cultural diversity and inclusivity.

== Government and politics ==
Presidential elections results
Year	Republican	Democratic	Third parties
2020	28% 1,520	69% 3,724	1% 81
2016	31% 1,464	64% 2,994	5% 232
2012	36% 1,558	62% 2,671	2% 88

Congressman Chris Deluzio represents the area in the United States House of Representatives as a part of Pennsylvania's 17th congressional district. Dormont is in District 42 of the Pennsylvania Senate and is represented by Wayne Fontana. Dormont is in District 42 of the Pennsylvania House of Representatives and is represented by local resident Jen Mazzocco.

Dormont operates under a council–manager form of government. The borough is governed by a seven-member Borough Council, which is responsible for municipal legislation, budgeting, public works, public safety, and community development. The borough manager oversees daily administrative operations.

As of October 2026, Jason Walsh serves as mayor, and Amie M. Downs serves as president of Borough Council. Christopher Kipp serves as vice president, and Daniele Ventresca serves as president pro tempore. The remaining council members are Kate Abel Fabus, Shawn Melvin, Chris Rieger, and Josh Munson. John P. Stinner serves as borough manager.

== Education ==
Since 1965, Dormont's school system, Keystone Oaks School District, is a jointure with the boroughs of Castle Shannon and Green Tree. The borough itself includes Dormont Elementary School, Keystone Oaks Middle School and Keystone Oaks High School. None of the three communities which make up the Keystone Oaks School District are contiguous and Keystone Oaks Middle and High Schools are located just outside the Dormont Borough line in neighboring Mt. Lebanon.

Dormont Elementary School is on the site of the old Dormont High School on Annapolis Ave. When the Keystone Oaks High School building was completed in 1969, the old high school was changed to Jay Neff Middle School, named after the superintendent of Dormont schools. In 1996, the old middle school was demolished, and Keystone Oaks High School expanded to include Keystone Oaks Middle School. A brand-new building for the grade school was then built, bringing together students from the two previous grade schools, Kelton and Hillsdale. The Kelton School building, located on a hillside adjacent to Keystone Oaks (corner of Kelton & Delwood Aves.), was razed also in 1996; it is now occupied with a soccer field. Hillsdale School (Hillsdale Ave. between Glenmore and Espy Aves.) is now the Dormont Municipal Building which also houses the Dormont Historical Society.

Dormont is also home to the South Hills Beauty Academy and the Pittsburgh Bartending School.

== Infrastructure ==
Dormont has a comprehensive public works department responsible for services like street maintenance, snow removal, leaf collection, recycling, trash collection, and operating the Dormont Stormwater Authority.

== Notable people ==
- Christine Laitta
- Joe Manganiello
- Bill Mazeroski
- George A. Romero
- W. D. Snodgrass
- Jen Mazzocco

Preceded by Green Tree	Bordering communities of Pittsburgh	Succeeded by Castle Shannon
