= Keystone Oaks High School =

Location
- 1000 Kelton Avenue; Pittsburgh, Pennsylvania 15216; 40.387120°N 80.030297°W

Information
- Type: Public high school
- Established: 1969
- School district: Keystone Oaks School District
- Principal: Michael Linnert
- Teaching staff: 42.62 (FTE)
- Grades: 9–12
- Enrollment: 577 (2023-2024)
- Student to teacher ratio: 13.54
- Color
- Mascot: Golden eagle
- Website: kosd.org

Keystone Oaks High School or KO is a public high school located in Mt. Lebanon, Pennsylvania. It is the only high school in the Keystone Oaks School District, which serves the Pittsburgh suburbs of Castle Shannon, Dormont, and Green Tree.

== History ==
The main building of the high school was built in 1969, four years after the three suburbs of Green Tree, Dormont and Castle Shannon combined their students to form a common school district. The high school was built on a 43-acre (170,000 m^{2}) tract of land in neighboring Mount Lebanon, just outside the southwest border of Dormont. The site adjoined the Kelton Avenue Elementary School, which no longer exists.

The name 'Keystone Oaks' refers to the merger of the three school districts: 'key' for the 'door' in Dormont; 'stone' from the 'castle' in Castle Shannon; and 'oak' as a tree in Green Tree. The name was suggested by Thomas Clark, of the Class of 1965, and was chosen as part of a student competition to name the new school district.

Due to the deteriorating state of the district's Jay Neff Middle School (the original Dormont High School), a new middle school was attached to the old high school in 1996. This precipitated a massive redesign of the grounds, including the demolition of a little-used outdoor amphitheatre and the construction of a band practice field and new tennis courts. These tennis courts were later repaved in 2006.

Through the summer of 2001 and the 2001/2002 school year, the high school was renovated.

== Notable alumni ==
- Dennis Miller, Comedian
- Ron Paul, American author, activist, physician and retired politician who served as the U.S. representative for Texas's 22nd congressional district from 1976 to 1977 and again from 1979 to 1985, as well as for Texas's 14th congressional district from 1997 to 2013. On three occasions, he sought the presidency of the United States: as the Libertarian Party nominee in 1988 and as a candidate for the Republican Party in 2008 and 2012.
- Jeff Wilke, businessman and former Amazon executive
