= Paul Jaworski =

Polish-American bank robber and crime boss

- Born: Paul Poluszynski; 1900; Poland
- Died: January 21, 1929 (aged 28/29); SCI Rockview, Pennsylvania, US
- Resting place: Prison Cemetery, Rockview; 40.85028°N 77.77722°W
- Known for: Coverdale armored car robbery
- Status: Executed by electrocution
- Conviction: First degree murder
- Penalty: Death sentence

Paul Jaworski (born Paul Poluszynski; 1900 – January 21, 1929) was a Polish-American gangster born in Poland. He immigrated to the United States in 1905.

== First armored car robbery ==
He was the leader of the Flathead gang, which committed the first-ever armored car robbery, on March 11, 1927. The gang stole over $104,000 from an armored vehicle on Bethel Road (now Brightwood Road), Bethel, (now Bethel Park), 7 miles outside of Pittsburgh, Pennsylvania. The bandits placed 500 pounds of black powder (stolen the previous day from nearby Mine 3 in Mollenaur, PA) under the roadbed, and made off with money that was on its way to Coverdale, Pennsylvania for the Pittsburgh Terminal Coal Company.

== Detroit News payroll robbery ==
The gang was also known for the payroll robbery of The Detroit News business offices in 1928.

== Execution ==
Jaworski was shot and arrested in Detroit on 13 September 1928, while attempting to escape from the police across Chambers Avenue, after being hunted down to a nearby restaurant. He was sentenced to death in Pennsylvania on January 2, but received a stay of execution, until a sanity evaluation could be completed.

Jaworski was executed by electric chair in Pennsylvania for a separate payroll robbery which resulted in a murder. The execution took place on January 21, 1929. Although born to Catholic parents, when offered the services of a chaplain before his execution Jaworski said:

"I preached atheism since the day I quit singing the choir. A man is yellow if he spends his life believing in nothing and then comes crawling to the church because he is afraid his death is near."

== Books ==
- Kavieff, Paul (2001). The Violent Years: Prohibition and the Detroit Mobs (Gangsters and Rum Runners). Barricade Books. ISBN 1-56980-210-6.
