= Nick Kwiatkoski =

American football player (born 1993)

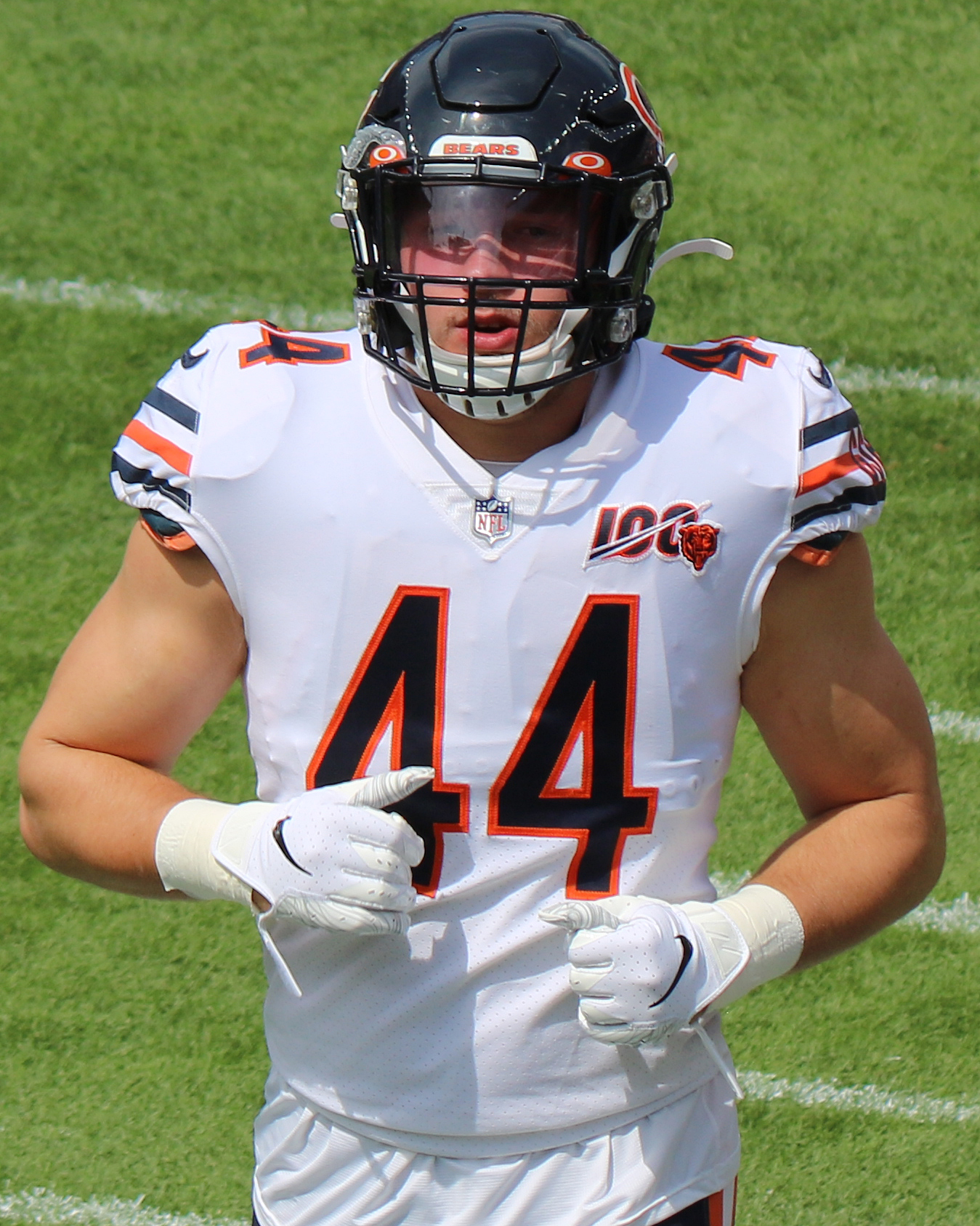
- Kwiatkoski with the Chicago Bears in 2019

No. 44, 53
- Position: Linebacker

Personal information
- Born: May 26, 1993 (age 33); Pittsburgh, Pennsylvania, U.S.
- Listed height: 6 ft 2 in (1.88 m)
- Listed weight: 242 lb (110 kg)

Career information
- High school: Bethel Park (Bethel Park, Pennsylvania)
- College: West Virginia (2011–2015)
- NFL draft: 2016: 4th round, 113th overall pick

Career history
- Chicago Bears (2016–2019); Las Vegas Raiders (2020–2021); Atlanta Falcons (2022); Pittsburgh Steelers (2023)*
- * Offseason or practice squad member only

Awards and highlights
- First-team All-Big 12 (2015)

Career NFL statistics
- Total tackles: 293
- Sacks: 7.0
- Forced fumbles: 6
- Pass deflections: 12
- Interceptions: 2
- Stats at Pro Football Reference

Nick Kwiatkoski (born May 26, 1993) is an American former professional football player who was a linebacker in the National Football League (NFL). He played college football for the West Virginia Mountaineers. He was selected by the Chicago Bears in the fourth round of the 2016 NFL draft.

== Early life ==
Kwiatkoski attended Bethel Park High School where he played wide receiver and safety. He was also named to the 2010 Pittsburgh Post-Gazette's preseason Fabulous 22 list. He missed the first two months of his senior season with a back injury. That season, he was selected to play in the Chesapeake Bowl. He was ranked the 32nd on Rivals.com's list of Pennsylvania's post-season top 40 players.

== College career ==
Kwiatkoski then attended West Virginia University (WVU) where he majored in multidisciplinary studies. As a freshman in 2011 he redshirted. As a redshirt freshman in 2012, he appeared in 12 games, starting one. He recorded 28 tackles and three pass break-ups. In 2013, as a redshirt sophomore, appeared in and started 10 games at the "Will" linebacker position. He recorded a team-leading 86 tackles, 6.5 tackles-for-loss, two sacks, two forced fumbles and tied for second on the team with three interceptions. For the season, he was named Second-team All-Big 12 Conference by Phil Steele. He also finished sixth in the Big 12 and 30th in the nation in solo tackles with 54. In addition, he ranked fifth in the conference in total tackles.

In 2014 as a redshirt junior, Kwiatkoski started all 13 games. He led the team with 103 tackles while simultaneously leading with 71 solo tackles. In addition, he was the team leader in tackles-for-loss with 11.5. He also recorded an assisted sack and four pass-breakups. For the season, he ranked fifth in the Big 12 in solo tackles, tied for ninth in the Big 12 in total tackles and for 12th in the conference in tackles-for-loss. As a redshirt senior in 2015, he appeared in all 13 games. He recorded 86 tackles, 10 tackles-for-loss, three interceptions and one forced fumble.

=== Statistics ===
Season	Team	Games		Tackles					Interceptions			Fumbles	
Season	Team	GP	GS	Solo	Ast	Cmb	TfL	Sck	Int	PD	TD	FF	FR
2011	WVU	0	0	Redshirted									
2012	WVU	12	1	17	11	28	0	0.0	0	3	0	0	0
2013	WVU	10	10	54	32	86	6.5	2.0	3	0	0	2	0
2014	WVU	13	13	71	32	103	11.5	0.0	0	0	0	0	0
2015	WVU	13	13	63	23	86	10	0.0	3	0	0	1	0
Career		48	37	205	98	303	28	2.0	6	3	0	3	0

== Professional career ==
=== Pre-draft ===
On December 1, 2015, it was announced that Kwiatkoski had accepted his invitation to play in the 2016 Senior Bowl. On January 30, 2016, Kwiatkoski recorded three combined tackles as part of Dallas Cowboys head coach Jason Garrett's North team that lost 27–16 to the South. Kwiatkoski attended the NFL Scouting Combine in Indianapolis and completed all of the combine and positional drills. On April 1, 2016, Kwiatkoski participated at West Virginia's pro day, but opted to stand on his combine numbers and only performed positional drills. Kwiatkoski attended a single pre-draft visit with the Philadelphia Eagles. At the conclusion of the pre-draft process, Kwiatkoski was projected to be a fourth or fifth round pick by NFL draft experts and scouts. He was ranked as the 14th best outside linebacker prospect in the draft by DraftScout.com.

External videos
- Nick Kwiatkoski's NFL Combine Workout

Pre-draft measurables
Height	Weight	Arm length	Hand span	40-yard dash	10-yard split	20-yard split	20-yard shuttle	Three-cone drill	Vertical jump	Broad jump	Bench press
6 ft 2 in (1.88 m)	243 lb (110 kg)	31 3/4 in (0.81 m)	9 1/2 in (0.24 m)	4.73 s	1.62 s	2.73 s	4.22 s	7.16 s	32 in (0.81 m)	10 ft 0 in (3.05 m)	19 reps
All values from NFL Combine

=== Chicago Bears ===
The Chicago Bears selected Kwiatkoski in the fourth round (113th overall) of the 2016 NFL draft; to draft him, the Bears traded their fourth (117th overall) and sixth round picks (206th overall) to the Los Angeles Rams in order to move up. He was the 15th linebacker drafted in 2016. On May 9, 2016, the Bears signed Kwiatkoski to a four-year, $2.91 million contract that includes a signing bonus of $575,120.

External videos
- Bears draft Kwiatkoski 113th overall
- NFL Draft Profile: Nick Kwiatkoski

Kwiatkoski started seven games during his rookie year and led the team in tackles in two games (six against the Tennessee Titans, nine against the Detroit Lions). The following year, he appeared in eleven games (starting six) as he recorded 47 tackles and two sacks. He ended the 2017 season as the third-best inside linebacker in run-stop percentage and fourth-best in pass-rush productivity according to Pro Football Focus.

He opened 2018 as the starting inside linebacker before rookie Roquan Smith took over the role. In Week 17 against the Minnesota Vikings, Kwiatkoski caught a pass from quarterback Mitchell Trubisky on a two-point conversion play dubbed "Lollipop"; it was Kwiatkoski's first reception since high school.

In Week 4 of the 2019 season against the Vikings, he started in place of an injured Smith. In the game, he recorded a team-high ten tackles and sacked quarterback Kirk Cousins once in the 16–6 win. In Week 10 against the Detroit Lions, Kwiatkoski recorded a sack and an interception off Jeff Driskel in the 20–13 win.

=== Las Vegas Raiders ===
On March 27, 2020, Kwiatkoski signed a three-year, $21 million contract with the Las Vegas Raiders.

In Week 8 against the Cleveland Browns, Kwiatkoski forced a fumble on tight end Harrison Bryant which was recovered by the Raiders during the 16–6 win. This was Kwiatkoski's first turnover as a Raider. In Week 10 against the Denver Broncos, Kwiatkoski recorded his first interception as a Raider off a pass thrown by Drew Lock late in the fourth quarter to secure a 37–12 win. In Week 12 against the Atlanta Falcons, Kwiatkoski recorded his first sack of the season on Matt Ryan during the 43–6 loss. Kwiatkowski was placed on the reserve/COVID-19 list by the Raiders on December 23, 2020.

On December 8, 2021, Kwiatkoski was placed on injured reserve.

On March 16, 2022, Kwiatkoski was released by the Raiders.

=== Atlanta Falcons ===
On May 12, 2022, Kwiatkoski signed with the Atlanta Falcons. He was waived during final roster cuts on August 30. On September 1, Kwiatkoski re–signed with the Falcons. On October 16, he made his season-debut after being inactive the first five weeks of the year, with one tackle during a 28–14 win over the San Francisco 49ers.

=== Pittsburgh Steelers ===
On June 19, 2023, Kwiatkoski signed with his hometown team, the Pittsburgh Steelers. He was released on August 29, 2023, as a part of the team's final roster cuts.
