= Bethel Presbyterian Church (Bethel Park, Pennsylvania) =

Church in Bethel Park, Pennsylvania US

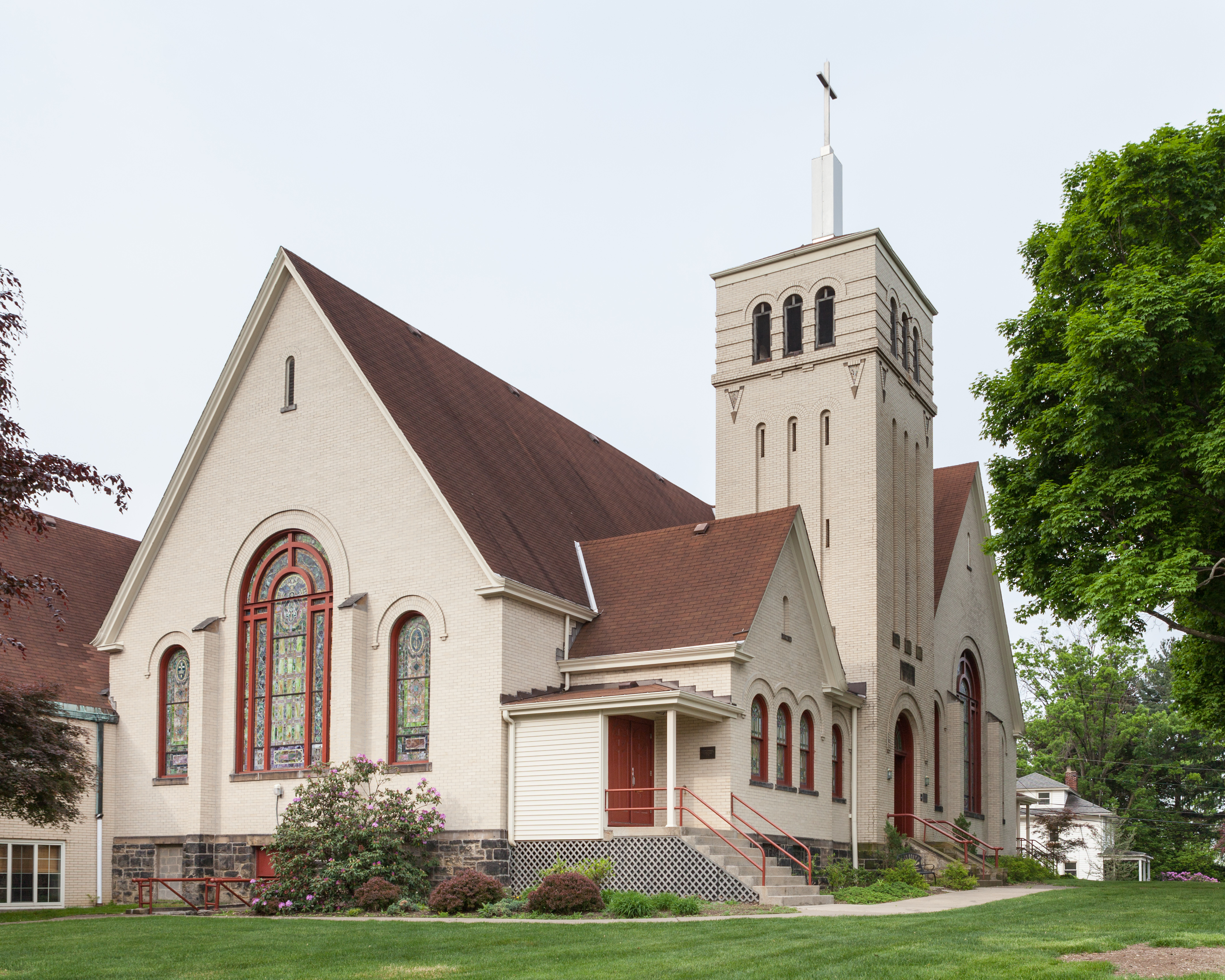
- East and north side of the portion of the church that faces Bethel Church Road

- Location within Pennsylvania

Religion
- Affiliation: Presbyterian
- Year consecrated: May 1910
- Status: active

Location
- Location: 2977 Bethel Church Road, between PA 88 & US 19, Bethel Park, Pennsylvania, US
- Municipality: Bethel Park, Pennsylvania
- State: Pennsylvania
- Interactive map of Bethel Presbyterian Church
- Coordinates: 40.33658°N 80.04797°W

Architecture
- Pennsylvania Historical Marker
- Designated: August 21, 1951

Bethel Presbyterian Church is a Presbyterian Church located in Bethel Park, Pennsylvania. It operates under the Presbyterian Church U.S.A. denomination under the Synod of the Trinity and the Pittsburgh Presbytery. The adjacent cemetery holds the remains of 14 Revolutionary War soldiers from the area. The municipality of Bethel Park was named after the church.

The church was founded by Rev. John McMillan, the first Presbyterian missionary west of the Allegheny Mountains, during his third missionary trip. The origins of the Bethel Presbyterian Church date to November 5, 1776, when McMillan preached and baptized 5 children at Peter's Creek. Early services were held at a log house owned by Oliver Miller. The Peter's Creek congregation grew and later split into an Eastern Division and the Western Division. In 1785 or 1786, the Eastern Division was renamed Lebanon and the Western Division was renamed Bethel. In 1808, Oliver Miller's son James added a stone section to the right of his father's log house and in 1830 he and his son Oliver replaced the log house with a new stone section, now known as the Oliver Miller Homestead.

A number of members of Bethel Presbyterian Church played roles in the Whiskey Rebellion. On July 15, 1794, shots were fired as federal officers served a warrant on William Miller, a Bethel church member and the last man that day in Allegheny County to receive a warrant for failure to register his still, the first violent event of the Whiskey Rebellion. After that incident, a crowd gathered. Reverend Clark, McMillan's successor, tried to dissuade the band:

Brethren, fellow citizens and friends, I have come to raise my feeble voice against the business of the day. Duty, conscience, my office, the spirit of our Divine Lord and Master, a high and loving concern for your temporal and spiritual good, all compel me to warn you not to persist in your hostile purpose. You are in the way of rebellion, and rebellion is as the sin of witchcraft.

— Rev. Clark, July 17, 1794,

Clark's pleas was ultimately unsuccessful, and the group advanced upon General John Neville's house, burning it to the ground, a confrontation known as Battle of Bower Hill.

The modern incarnation of the church was officially incorporated on March 11, 1907. The current building was completed May 1910.

In 1951, the Pennsylvania Historical and Museum Commission erected a historical marker, noting its connection to Rev. John McMillan and its historic importance.
