= Jeff Wilke =

American businessman and executive (born 1966)

- Born: Jeffrey Alan Wilke; 1966 (age 59–60); Pittsburgh, Pennsylvania, U.S.
- Education: Princeton University (BSE), Chemical Engineering Massachusetts Institute of Technology (SM), Chemical Engineering, (MBA), Management
- Occupations: Businessman; Engineer; Investor
- Title: CEO of Amazon Worldwide Consumer

Jeffrey Alan Wilke (born 1966) is an American businessman and engineer. He was chief executive officer of Amazon's worldwide consumer business from 2016 to 2021 and was previously a senior vice president overseeing Amazon's North American retail and worldwide operations.

== Early life ==
Jeff Wilke was born in 1966 at Allegheny General Hospital in Pittsburgh, Pennsylvania, and grew up in the suburb of Green Tree, Pennsylvania. He attended and graduated from Keystone Oaks High School, located in neighboring Mt. Lebanon, where he played baseball. Wilke attended Princeton University, where he studied chemical engineering and earned a B.S.E.. He subsequently attended the Massachusetts Institute of Technology's Leaders for Global Operations program, earning an S.M. in chemical engineering and an MBA in 1993.

== Career ==
=== Amazon ===
Wilke joined Amazon in 1999 and initially worked in the company's operations organization. Following Amazon's growth, Wilke subsequently held a series of increasingly senior positions within Amazon's retail and operations businesses. In January 2007, he became senior vice president of North America Retail. In February 2012, he was promoted to senior vice president of Consumer Business.

In April 2016, Wilke became chief executive officer of Amazon's Worldwide Consumer business. In that position, he oversaw Amazon's retail and third-party marketplace businesses as well as operations, marketing, Prime, technology, and other consumer-facing businesses. During his tenure, his organization was responsible for the launch and expansion of products and services including Prime Video, Prime Now, Prime Day, and Amazon Fashion. He also oversaw the integration of Whole Foods Market following Amazon's acquisition of the company in 2017.

As CEO of Worldwide Consumer, Wilke became one of Amazon's highest-ranking executives and was regarded as a potential successor to founder and current CEO Jeff Bezos. In 2020, Amazon announced that Wilke would retire in the first quarter of 2021 after 21 years at Amazon. Dave Clark, then senior vice president of retail operations, was named as his successor.

=== Other ventures ===
Following his retirement from Amazon, Wilke became chairman and co-founder of Re:Build Manufacturing, a manufacturing company focused on combining advanced technologies with traditional manufacturing businesses. The company includes Slate Auto. Wilke has also been on the board of Code.org.

== Personal life ==
Wilke is married to Liesl Wilke, an author, screenwriter, and playwright. The couple met while attending Princeton University and have two daughters, whom they raised in the Seattle, Washington area. They established the Wilke Family Foundation in 2007 and have supported organizations focused on education, technology, and other philanthropic causes.

== See also ==
- List of people from Pittsburgh
