= Guadalupe Hayes-Mota =

American biotechnologist

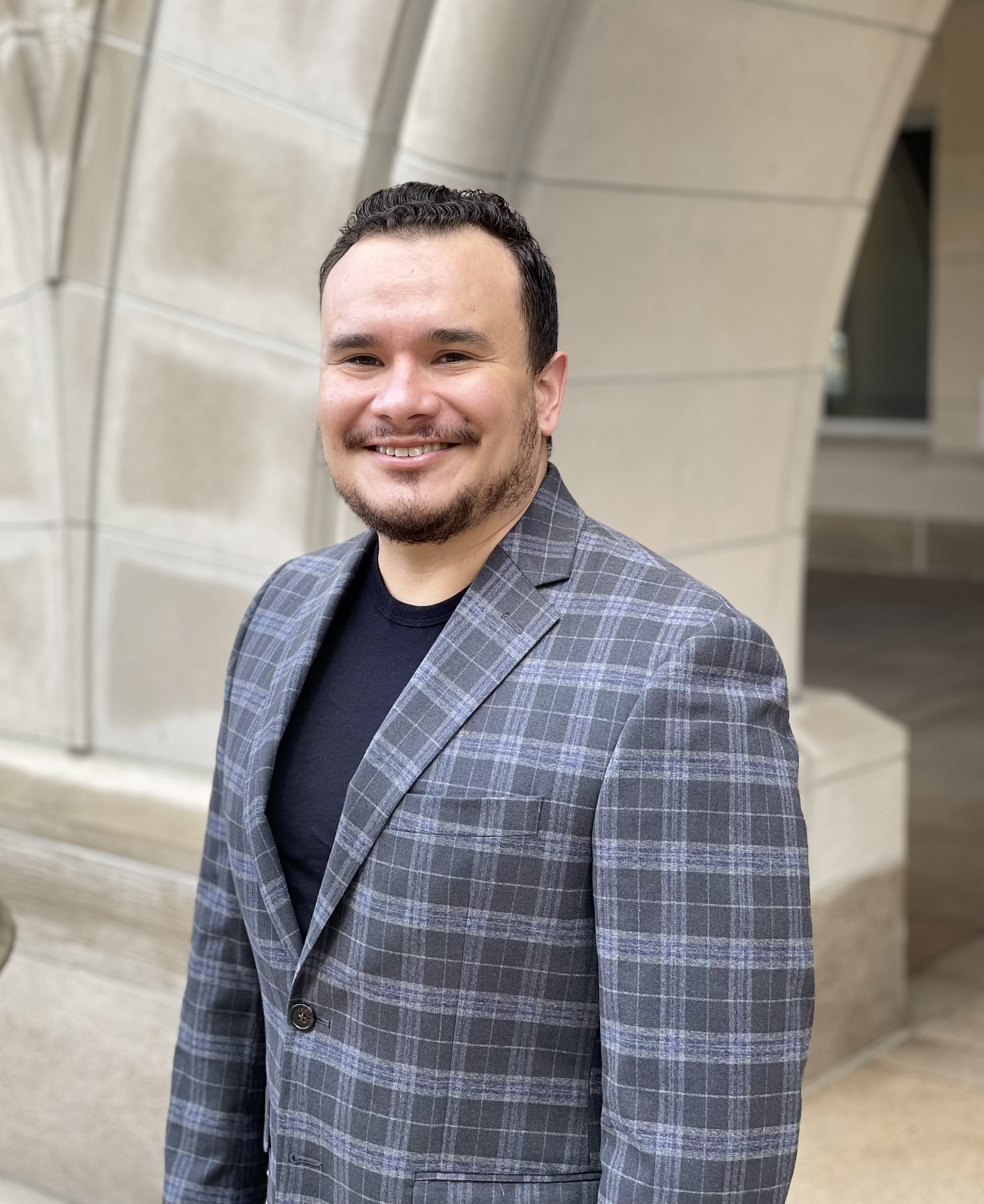
- Education: Massachusetts Institute of Technology (BS), (MS), (MBA); Georgetown University (MPP); Harvard University (MPA); George Washington University (D.Eng)
- Occupations: Biotechnologist, Business Director, CEO
- Known for: Affordable Care Act; Supply chain Biotechnology; AI
- Spouse: Nicholas Hayes-Mota

Guadalupe Hayes-Mota (born April 30, 1986) is an American biotechnologist, entrepreneur, policy advisor, writer and author. He is the CEO of Healr Solutions, a Senior Lecturer at MIT, Director of Bioethics Program at Santa Clara University, and a Massachusetts Rare Disease Advisory Council Member.

== Early life ==
Hayes-Mota grew up in Mexico and was diagnosed with hemophilia at birth. Born with a rare form of hemophilia in a small town in Mexico, his family often undertook an eight-hour bus journey to reach his hematologist, only to find the necessary medication unavailable. A critical moment came when Hayes-Mota experienced a near-fatal incident due to appendicitis, complicated by uncontrollable bleeding from his hemophilia. Doctors warned his parents that he might not survive the night. Hayes-Mota survived, prompting his family to relocate to California in search of better healthcare. Four years after arriving in the United States he graduated from Serrano High School as Salutatorian.

== Career ==
He has a BS in Chemistry, BS in Literature, MS in AI Systems engineering and an MBA from MIT, where he was a Gates Scholar and Leaders for Global Operations Fellow. He holds a Master of Public Policy from Georgetown University and a Master of Public Administration from Harvard, where he was a fellow at the Center for Public Leadership. He got a Doctor of Engineering in AI and Machine learning at George Washington University studying the usage of AI in drug development and discovery. Hayes-Mota got accepted to medical school at UCSF School of Medicine and Harvard Medical School, but decided not to enroll. He conducted drug delivery research at the lab of Robert S. Langer and was elected to Sigma Xi. Also, Hayes-Mota ran a free healthcare system of clinics at UCLA Health. Early in his career, Hayes-Mota was an analyst at the RAND Corporation working in the Affordable Care Act.

Hayes-Mota is the Director of Bioethics Program at Santa Clara University at Markkula Center for Applied Ethics. He was the CEO and founder of Healr Solutions, an AI-powered company optimizing drug distribution and production worldwide, which he successfully exited and sold to investors. Hayes-Mota led as Senior Vice-President of Global Supply Chain and Manufacturing at Ultragenyx Pharmaceutical. Previously, at Biogen, Amgen and GSK he directed the manufacturing and distribution of medicines to 113 countries, providing 2.3 billion people with treatments.

In 2024, the U.S. Department of Health and Human Services Secretary, Xavier Becerra, appointed Guadalupe Hayes-Mota, to serve on the Cures Acceleration Network (CAN) Review Board of the NIH to provide expert guidance on accelerating the development and delivery of medical treatments, impacting millions of lives globally.

In 2021, Hayes-Mota was appointed to the Massachusetts Rare Disease Advisory Council by Governor Charlie Baker to advise the House of Representatives, governor, Senate, and Department of Public Health on rare disease policy in Massachusetts. He is an AI Expert Advisor for the European Commission, providing direction in AI policy for the EU and the globe.

He is Practitioner in Residence and Senior Lecturer at the Massachusetts Institute of Technology. He is also a keynote speaker, and he delivered the Latinx and Lavender graduation speeches at Massachusetts Institute of Technology. He served on the board of directors of the MIT LBGTQ+ Alumni Association, which he refounded and led as president. Hayes-Mota also is on the board of Fenway Health, Save One Life, MIT Alumni Association, the Forbes Business Council, the Fast Company Impact Council, and the Harvard Business Review Advisory Council. He is a writer for Forbes and Fast Company regarding biotechnology, artificial intelligence, and business.

== Personal life ==
Hayes- Mota in 2012, finished 1st place (25 – 29 M) in the Death Valley half marathon and completed 16 marathons. He competed in ballroom dancing at the college level at MIT, and won second place dance competition at Boston University Dancesport Competition. He is bisexual and married to Nicholas Hayes-Mota and he is an airplane pilot.

== Awards and recognitions ==
- Business Insider recognized Hayes-Mota as one of six powerful LGBTQ+ executives to have on corporate boards.
- Named as one of the 100 Most Inspiring and Influential People by PharmaVoice in the Life Science Industry in 2020 and 2023.
- Named one of the Ten Outstanding Young Leaders by the Greater Boston Chamber of commerce.
- Top LGBT Leader by Endpoints News.
- Named Boston Business Journal 40 under 40.
- Won MIT's Margaret L. A. MacVicar Award.
- Speaker at the National Academy of Engineering's Frontier of Engineering Symposium.
