= Keystone Oaks School District =

School district in Pennsylvania

Coordinates: 40.38745°N 80.03177°W

Address
- 1000 Kelton Avenue Pittsburgh, Pennsylvania, 15216; United States

District information
- Type: Public
- Established: 1965; 61 years ago

Students and staff
- District mascot: Golden Eagle
- Colors: Gold and white

Other information
- Website: http://www.kosd.org/

Keystone Oaks School District is a small, public school district in suburban Pittsburgh, Pennsylvania. The district consists of 3 non-contiguous communities and encompasses approximately 5 square miles (13 km^{2}). It was formed in 1965 after the merger of three smaller districts serving Dormont, Castle Shannon (except for a portion that is served by the Bethel Park School District), and Green Tree. The district's name refers to a "key" to a door for Dormont, a "stone" in a castle for Castle Shannon and the "oaks" of Green Tree.

According to 2000 federal census data, Keystone Oaks School District serves a resident population of 22,580 people.

The district operates five schools: Aiken Elementary (K-5 in Green Tree), Dormont Elementary (K-5 in Dormont), Myrtle Elementary (K-5 in Castle Shannon), Keystone Oaks Middle School, and Keystone Oaks High School.

The Keystone Oaks middle and high school campus sits just outside Dormont’s northeast border in neighboring Mt. Lebanon, though it operates entirely independently of the Mt. Lebanon School District.
