= Bethel Park High School =

Public high school in Bethel Park, Pennsylvania, United States

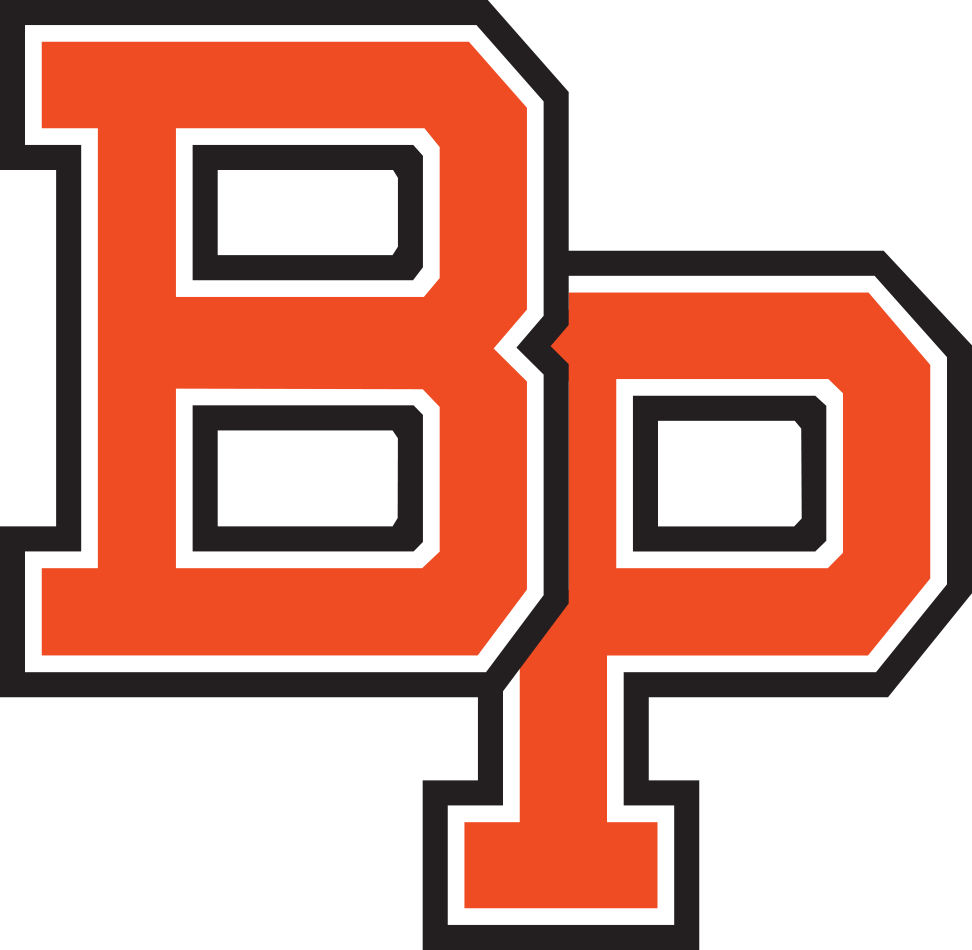

Location
- 309 Church Road; Bethel Park, Pennsylvania 15102; United States; 40°20′1″N 80°2′32″W

Information
- Type: Public
- Motto: "Where Futures Begin"
- Established: 1908; 118 years ago
- School district: Bethel Park School District
- NCES School ID: 420351000062
- Principal: Racquel Sutton
- Teaching staff: 93.86 (FTE)
- Grades: 9–12
- Enrollment: 1,291 (2023–2024)
- Student to teacher ratio: 13.75
- Colors: Black and orange
- Athletics: Black Hawks
- Athletics conference: WPIAL
- Mascot: Black Hawk
- Website: bphs.bpsd.org

Bethel Park High School, also called BPHS, is a four-year, comprehensive high school located in Bethel Park, Pennsylvania, with an enrollment of 1,391 students in grades 9–12 for the 2018–2019 school year. Its curriculum includes ten Advanced Placement Program courses, 14 honors courses, and four foreign language programs (Spanish, Latin, French, and German). Its mascot is the Black Hawk.

It is a part of the Bethel Park School District, which includes Bethel Park and a portion of Castle Shannon.

== Old campus ==
The high school was one of few in Pennsylvania composed of more than three buildings. It was initially intended to serve dual purposes as both the high school for Bethel Park and a campus for the Community College of Allegheny County. The campus opened in 1959 and was extensively renovated in 1996.

- Building 1 – Science and Health. Also homerooms for freshmen.
- Building 2 – Social Studies, Business and Foreign Language. Also, homerooms for second-/first-year students.
- Building 3 – Math, Art, Computer Science and Marketing. Also, homerooms for juniors
- Building 4 – English, and Family and consumer science. Also, homerooms for seniors and the location of both the principal's office, the attendance office, the nurse's office, and the Writing Center.
- Building 5 – Technology education, and the Golf Room in the basement.
- Building 6 – Gym, the pool, the Athletic Office, the locker rooms, and the rifle range in the basement.
- Building 7 – Cafeteria, Music, Auditorium, and Theatre arts.
- Building 8 – Media Center (Library).

Buildings 2, 3, and 4 each featured a courtyard in the center. The courtyard of Building 2 featured trees and flower gardens. The courtyard of Building 3 had a circle of bricks. The courtyard of Building 4 featured a fountain with a pond, benches, and flower gardens. Some teachers held classes in the courtyards when the weather was nice.

== New school ==
In 2009, plans were made to build a new single-building school. In 2010, the ground was broken in an area just south of the campus that had previously served as a parking lot and practice field for the school. The new building was completed in mid-2011, and students were moved in during January 2012. The old campus was then promptly demolished, and this area now serves as a parking and practice field.

The new building consists of an academic wing, a music wing, a cafeteria, an auditorium, and a gymnasium. There are smaller exercise rooms surrounding the gymnasium and an 8-lane pool with two diving boards on the bottom level. A Large Group Instruction room allows for large presentations and meetings. The courtyard in the center of the U-shaped high school has a large grass field and a recently installed pond. The pond was created during the 2014–2015 school year primarily by the school's theater teacher and the Drama Club. However, many other clubs and organizations contributed to the project, including but not limited to PACS, SGA, and even the football team. The pond contains many plants and wildlife, including a few box turtles. A time capsule, set to be open in February 2062, is also buried in the courtyard.

== History ==
When the school district was formed in 1886, Bethel was a township, so the name of the school district was the Bethel Township School District.

Bethel Park High School was originally called Bethel Township High School. The first high school held two classrooms and an auditorium; it employed four teachers. It was constructed in 1905 at the corner of South Park Road and Park Avenue for $6,400 and still stands today. The Bethel Park Historical Society is restoring it. The first class of 15 students, five males and ten females, graduated in 1909.

In 1914, the high school changed to a four-year program. Around 1920, extracurricular activities began. A 10-room grade school was constructed in 1927 next door to the high school on Park Avenue (the current site of the Bethel Park Community Center). The enrollment at the high school level outgrew the original building, and the high school students switched schools to the younger ones in 1934.

Over the years, enrollment increased, necessitating additions to the high school on Park Avenue. During the construction of a new addition to the school on July 11, 1939, a fire broke out and heavily damaged the building, but construction continued. On September 20, 1940, a dedication was held to commemorate the new addition to the building. In 1949, a gymnasium was added to the Park Avenue school, and in 1952, an upper wing was constructed to meet growing enrollment and student educational needs

In 1956, the Board of School Directors purchased an 80-acre (320,000 m^{2}) plot on Church Road, known at that time as McCormack Farm. Plans were drawn to create a campus environment, and in the fall of 1959, sophomores, juniors, and seniors moved to their six-building campus, which consisted of two academic buildings, a library, an auditorium/cafeteria, physical education building, a boiler house for $4.1 million for construction and equipment. Ninth graders stayed at the junior high.

Ninth graders returned to campus in the fall of 1964 and were excluded again beginning in 1976. Finally, ninth graders returned to the campus again in 1985 and have remained since.

The school was called Bethel High School until the campus high school opened in 1959, changing the name to Bethel Senior High School. It was not until 1964 that the school district added "Park" to its name, becoming Bethel Park Senior High School.

The new Bethel Senior High School was dedicated on October 23, 1960, but the campus would not grow to its current size until seven years later. Phase II of the construction was completed in 1964 with the addition of another academic building and the industrial arts building. Phase III was completed in 1967 with the construction of the fourth academic building and a 6,300-seat football stadium and track, three tennis courts, seven basketball courts, and a baseball field, as well as additions to the library, cafeteria, and physical education building. Ten classrooms were added to Buildings 2 and 3 in 1969.

In 1972, the first Bethel Township High School was converted into the Schoolhouse Arts Center and was given historic landmark designation by the Pittsburgh History & Landmarks Association in 1990. It was sold to the Bethel Park Historical Society in 1996. It is currently undergoing a $1 million renovation and re-branded as the Schoolhouse Arts & History Center. When the high school students moved to their new campus, the former high school on Park Avenue was used as a junior high school until it was sold in 1974. It was sold to the Municipality of Bethel Park in 1975 for $1 and closed in 1980.

It was demolished in 1990 and is now the home of the Bethel Park Community Center. Before the school was demolished, the Bethel High School compass-style floor emblem in the vestibule, linking the gymnasium and auditorium in the old school, was carefully removed. The emblem is 9'2" in diameter and constructed from terrazzo, and now proudly adorns the lobby of the Community Center.

In June 1994, a 26-month, $20 million renovation included new roofs, ceilings, terrazzo tile and carpeting, site work, painting, elevators, plumbing, and HVAC, as well as renovations to the gymnasium/swimming pool and industrial arts building. All renovations were completed to the eight buildings by 1996. Around 1996, "Senior" was dropped, and the school is currently known as Bethel Park High School.

During the late 2000s, plans were made for a new high school to replace the campus. The idea was proposed for security reasons (anyone could walk into the old high school with no trouble; students could leave school midday without notice), as well as the fact that the old school was falling apart from age and corners cut during the 1996 renovation. Ground was broken on the new school in 2010, south of the old campus next to the stadium parking lot. In 2012, the new school was finished, and students and staff were transferred to the new school for the second semester of the 2011–2012 school year. The buildings of the old campus were slowly demolished over the following months, with the landmark "Smokestack", once connected to Building 5, being the last part of the campus to be torn down. As the old school went down, new practice fields and parking lots were built over the remains. The work on the new fields and campus is, as of October 2013, almost 100% complete. The only remaining parts of the old campus are the Bladerunners Ice Rink complex, Blackhawk Drive, Blackhawk Stadium, and Perkey Memorial Field, along with a few sidewalks that once connected the campus to Blackhawk Drive.

== Student life ==
=== 1930s ===
Curriculum in the 1930s consisted of English, History, French, Home Economics, Social Studies, Music, Latin, Science and Math. Events like the May Day Celebration, class banquets, Halloween Parties, and a New Year's Dance were part of school life. Operettas were presented instead of the Musical. Clubs such as Girl Reserves, Hi-Y, The Secret Sixteen, and the Junior Birdmen were popular among the students. Sports were limited to Boys Basketball and Football. Girls' Basketball was an intramural sport. The first school cafeteria in Allegheny County opened at Bethel Grade School in 1930 and was staffed by students who earned one credit toward graduation for their participation.

=== 1940s ===
The 1940s ended the Depression and the beginning of World War II. Many young Bethel High School male students participated in the war like other schools. Female students did their part in the war effort by participating in organizations such as the Girl Reserves to knit mittens and socks for the soldiers. Because of war conditions, several interscholastic sports were canceled. After the war, school life returned to normal, with music and dancing in the cafeteria during lunchtime for those who stayed.

Dancing was an important part of school social life in the 1940s, with the Student Council holding weekly dances in addition to the Prom and May Dance, which were held in the gymnasium.

The curriculum expanded to include classes such as Shorthand, Wood Shop, Art, Physical Education, Spanish, and Penmanship.

Student clubs of the 1940s included the 8x Owls and Miracle Book Club. Sports grew to include Boys Golf.

=== 1950s ===
As Bethel moved into the 1950s, the high school began to grow. A new gymnasium with a divider enabled boys' and girls' gym classes to be held simultaneously. Adding bleachers meant students could attend sporting events and cheer for their teams from the stands. Student organizations included the Canteen Committee, Sub Deb Club, Technician's Club, Radio Club, Forensics League, and the Future Teachers of America. Rifle was added as a sport. One of Bethel's great traditions was born in the 1950s—the Powder Puff Football Game, which pits senior girls against their junior counterparts for a friendly flag football game. This event, now more than 50 years old, "kicks off" the annual Homecoming Week festivities. In the 1950s, T.M. Buck, Bethel High School's Supervising Principal and the first Superintendent of the school district wrote this in the Bethlan student handbook: "High school provides the place and opportunity, but only your desire and will to work can make these good things result in qualities of scholarship, leadership and character for the individual; and only these will result in the kind of school we want. Good citizenship is the first step, and every one of you can take it. If each teacher and pupil 'gives' to the school, there will be plenty for all to 'take.'"

=== 1960s ===
The average student changed considerably as Bethel rocked and rolled into the 1960s. Events such as the assassination of John F. Kennedy and the onset of the Vietnam War prompted students to break away from conformity. However, while fashion and attitude were changing dramatically, school spirit remained. School clubs that were formed in the 1960s included Future Nurses of America, Leathercraft Club, Photography Club, Future Business Leaders of America, Mechanics Club, Electronics Club and Vernissage. Boys Swimming and Cross Country, as well as Girls Gymnastics, were new sports of the 1960s. In 1967, the Bethettes retired their batons to favor the now-famous pom-poms, but the uniforms have remained the same.

=== 1970s ===
The spirit of rebellion continued into the 1970s, accompanied by a great deal of self-evaluation, as students became skeptical that they could change the world. However, the Bethel student body was victorious in bringing change to their school. For example, Bethel students won the right to an Honor Study Program, the right to drive to school, and the right to influence the curriculum. But as conservatism dominated the late 70s, many of these privileges were revoked as the curriculum headed to a "back to basics" philosophy.

1970s student clubs reflected the interests of the day, including the Psychology Club, Chess Club, Coin Club, Radio Club, Last Resort Club, Monopoly Club, Flat Earth Society, Future Secretaries of America, and Astronomy Club.

Social events in the 1970s included the Sadie Hawkins Dance, Christmas Dance, Sock Hop, Sweetheart's Dance, and Campus Carnival. The 1970s saw the creation of several girls' sports teams, including Volleyball, Swimming, Tennis, Softball, Golf, Track, and Cross Country. Boys Ice Hockey had its inception in the 1970s as well.

=== 1980s ===
Graduating classes in the 1980s declined from more than 700 students in 1980 to 479 in 1989. The curriculum included interesting offerings such as an Independent Living Relations Class, which held a Greek Orthodox Mock Wedding. The Gourmet Cooking Class catered for the reception. Girls Soccer was added to the athletic offerings in the 1980s, and the clubs reflected students' interest in pop culture, with the Rubik's Cube Club and EPOCH (Europeans for the Preservation of Our Cultural Heritage). Activities in the 1980s included the Snow Ball Dance, Cupid's Connection Dance, a Beach Party, and a Tombstone Twist.

=== 1990s ===
Issues such as drunk driving brought about the creation of a SADD group in the 1990s, as well as a Newcomers Club to welcome new students to campus. Activities included the Club Coca-Cola Dance, Colonial Day, Twin Day, and Mardi Gras Week. Traditions that had their inception in the 1990s and continue today include Senior Appreciation Day, the Cheerleaders' Annual Fashion Show to benefit Make-A-Wish, the SGA Volleyball Tournament, and the ever-popular Man of the Year dance competition, which debuted in 1991. The Goofy Awards began in 1995 and continue today. 1990s new sports included Men's Lacrosse and Fencing. Classes included Research Techniques and Speedwriting.

== Extracurriculars ==
The district offers a variety of clubs, activities, and sports, including 28 varsity, 18 junior varsity, seven first-year teams, and four club sports (as of the 2019–2020 report). In addition, the BPHS produces both a fall play and a spring musical in which 150+ students participate.

== Notable alumni ==
- Trevor Barron, Olympic racewalker
- Thomas Crooks, attempted assassin of Donald Trump in July 2024
- Barbara Feldon, film and television actress, most notably co-star of Get Smart
- Armen Gilliam, professional basketball player, 2nd overall selection in 1987 NBA draft
- Richard G. Jewell, Grove City College president
- Nick Kwiatkoski, inside linebacker for Las Vegas Raiders
- Mason Miller, relief pitcher for San Diego Padres
- Joseph M. Papp, professional cyclist and anti-doping advocate
- "Weird" Paul Petroskey, lo-fi recording musician and subject of the documentary Will Work for Views: The Lo-Fi Life of Weird Paul
- Rick Sebak, screenwriter, producer, and narrator
- Joe Serafini, actor
- Jim Shooter, comic book writer and editor; editor-in-chief of Marvel Comics, 1978–1987; wrote comics while a student at BPHS
- Matthew H. Smith, politician and Pennsylvania State Representative
- Mike Westhoff, NFL coach; retired special teams coordinator for New York Jets
- Richard White, voice of Gaston in Disney's 1991 animated movie Beauty and the Beast
