= Leaders for Global Operations =

Leaders for Global Operations (LGO)
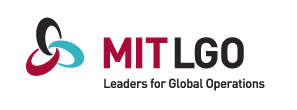
- Former name: LFM (Leaders for Manufacturing)
- Established: 1988
- Executive Director: Thomas Roemer
- Location: Cambridge, Massachusetts, United States
- Website: http://lgo.mit.edu

Leaders for Global Operations (LGO) is a Dual Degree Engineering MBA program offered by Massachusetts Institute of Technology (MIT), sponsored by the MIT Sloan School of Management (MBA) and MIT School of Engineering (MS engineering). MIT Leaders for Global Operations program ranks 1st in the U.S. News & World Report for 2022's MBA programs in operations and production, 5th overall, and 1st for best engineering school.

== History ==
MIT LGO began in 1988 as Leaders for Manufacturing (LFM) at a time when Japan and other overseas rivals were challenging U.S. manufacturing dominance in areas including the automotive industry. LGO students, who earn both an MBA form MIT Sloan and an SM from one of seven MIT School of Engineering program in two years, go on to become leaders in manufacturing and operations.

MIT LFM's founding directors were Thomas Magnanti, a former dean of the MIT School of Engineering and later the founding president of the Singapore University of Technology and Design; and H. Kent Bowen, an MIT faculty member in materials science and engineering and electrical engineering and computer science who is now the Bruce Rauner Professor of Business Administration, emeritus at Harvard Business School.

In 2009, the program announced that it was changing its name from Leaders for Manufacturing to Leaders for Global Operations. The name change reflected the expansion from LFM's historically broad understanding of manufacturing to encompass all aspects of operations. The change in name and mission allowed the program to address operations challenges beyond such traditional manufacturing sectors as automotive, aerospace, and high tech manufacturing, to include supply chain retailers such as Amazon and Inditex (Zara).

=== Founding companies ===
- Alcoa
- Boeing
- Digital Equipment Corporation (later Compaq)
- Eastman Kodak
- General Motors
- Hewlett-Packard
- Johnson & Johnson
- Motorola
- Polaroid
- United Technologies Corporation

== Program description ==
=== Program timeline ===
LGO is a 24-month program with the incoming class conducting the LGO Summer Core semester June–August. The LGO Summer Core consists of classes on operations, statistics, probability, optimization, Python programming, and leadership. In September, students conduct the Sloan MBA Core (Economics, Accounting, Communication, and Organizational Processes) with the greater MBA class along with additional MBA and Engineering Electives.

For 2-3 weeks during MIT's January Independent Activities Period, first-year students conduct their Domestic Plant Trek (DPT). DPT consists of visits to partner-company facilities where students receive in-depth tours of company operations and panel discussions with company leadership.

In February, about three-quarters of the class will return to campus to take MBA and Engineering Electives during the spring semester from February to May. In June–December, these students will perform their mandatory six-month internship with an LGO partner company. The remaining quarter of the class will complete their six-month internship in February–August and return to campus for the September–December fall semester for MBA and Engineering Electives.

LGO students return to campus for their final semester in February–May where they complete any remaining elective requirements and also complete a thesis based on their internship projects.

=== Internship ===
Every LGO student conducts a six-month industry-based research project. The projects focus on unique research in operations, data analytics, product development, manufacturing, and other high tech problems across many different industries. LGO internships provide an industrial “laboratory” for research on operations management and engineering. Students use cutting-edge advancements to tackle tangible solutions that benefit the host company. Internship research forms the basis for the master's thesis, which is a dual-degree academic paper.

All LGO internships take place at an LGO partner company. Companies develop business-critical projects in areas at the frontier of operations research and management.

=== Engineering departments ===
- Aeronautics and Astronautics
- Chemical Engineering
- Civil and Environmental Engineering
- Electrical Engineering and Computer Science
- Mechanical Engineering
- Nuclear Science and Engineering
- Operations Research

== Current partner companies ==
The program's partner companies include:

- Amazon
- American Industrial Partners
- Amgen
- Blue Origin
- Boeing
- Boston Scientific
- Caterpillar Inc.
- Inditex
- Johnson & Johnson
- LFM Capital
- National Grid plc
- NextEra Energy
- Nike, Inc.
- Nissan
- Northrop Grumman
- Re:Build Manufacturing
- ResMed
- Rivian
- RTX Corporation
- Sanofi
- Stanley Black & Decker
- Target Corporation
- Stryker
- Verizon
- Waymo

== People ==
=== Notable alumni ===
- Jim Lawton - CEO, Rethink Robotics - LGO ’90
- Patrick M. Shanahan - United States Deputy Secretary of Defense - LGO ‘91
- Rick Dauch - President and CEO, Accuride Corporation - LGO ’92
- Jeffrey A. Wilke - CEO of Worldwide Consumer at Amazon (company) - LGO ’93
- Bill Anderson - CEO, Genentech - LGO ’95
- Denise Johnson - Group President, Caterpillar Inc. - LGO ’97
- Mick Ferrell - CEO, ResMed - LGO ’97
- Guadalupe Hayes-Mota - CEO of Healr Solutions - LGO '16
