= Flathead gang =

Former gang of American bank robbers

The Flathead Gang, also known as The Flatheads, was a group of bank robbers. The gang was operating in the Detroit, Michigan area. When the police became a major problem for the gang they decided to move their robberies and other crimes to the state of Pennsylvania. Paul Jaworski, the leader of the gang was executed in Pennsylvania in 1929 for murder.

== Public notoriety ==
The Flatheads name first showed up on public record in 1927 when then Flatheads leader Paul Jaworski committed the nation's first armored car robbery. The gang received the most public exposure when they were involved in the payroll robbery involving the Detroit News offices.

== Crimes ==
- December 23, 1922: Gang kills Payroll Clerk/guard John Ross Dennis, Beadling PA during robbery.
- December 24, 1925: Gang kills a Mine Payroll Guard Isiah L. Gump Pittsburgh PA during robbery;
- Jaworski kills Jack Wright in quarrel over division of loot.
- March 11, 1927: Jaworski gang robs an armored car.
- March 12, 1927: Jaworski arrested; pleads guilty to killing Dennis and Gump;
- May 18, 1927: Jaworski sentenced to death for Gump Killing.
- August 18, 1927: Jaworski and another jail inmate shoots way out of Allegheny County Jail; two guards wounded.
- June 6, 1928: Detroit Polieman Sgt George Barstad shot by gang during robbery [dies of wounds June 6, 1928].
- Sept 13, 1928: Jaworski captured Cleveland Ohio; Cleveland Officer Anthony Wieczorek fatally wounded and Cleveland Officer George C Effinger dies of wounds March 20, 1933. Bystander Benjamin Majstrek wounded by a stray bullet.

== See also ==
- The Purple Gang
- Detroit Partnership
