= Bethel Park, Pennsylvania =

Borough in Pennsylvania, US

- Borough
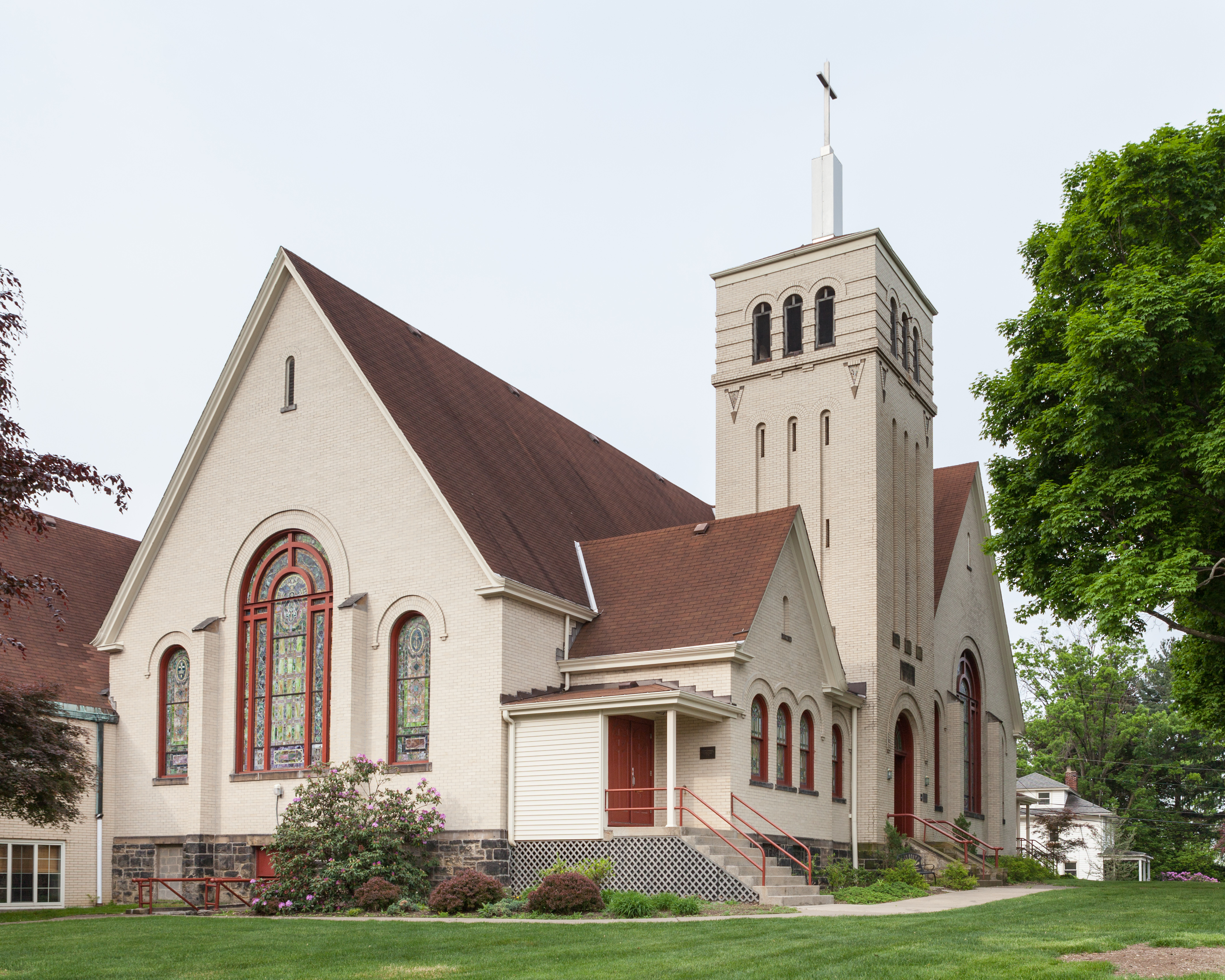
- Bethel Presbyterian Church, the community's namesake

- Flag Seal
- Interactive map of Bethel Park, Pennsylvania
- Location within Pennsylvania Location within the United States
- Coordinates: 40°19′39″N 80°2′22″W
- Country: United States
- State: Pennsylvania
- County: Allegheny
- Founded: 1886 (as township)
- Incorporated: 1949 (as borough)
- Named for: Bethel Presbyterian Church (Bethel Park, Pennsylvania)

Government
  - Type: Council
  - Mayor: Jack Allen (R)

Area
  - Total: 11.70 sq mi (30.31 km^{2})
  - Land: 11.70 sq mi (30.31 km^{2})
  - Water: 0 sq mi (0.00 km^{2})
- Elevation: 1,198 ft (365 m)

Population (2020)
  - Total: 33,577
  - Density: 2,869.3/sq mi (1,107.85/km^{2})
- Time zone: UTC-5 (Eastern (EST))
  - Summer (DST): UTC-4 (EDT)
- ZIP Code: 15102 (primary); 15234, 15236, 15241 (border communities)
- Area code: 412
- FIPS code: 42-06064
- Website: www.bethelparkpa.gov

Bethel Park is a borough with home rule status in Allegheny County, Pennsylvania, United States. It is a suburb within the Pittsburgh metropolitan area, approximately 7 miles (11 km) south of Pittsburgh. The population was 33,577 as of the 2020 census.

== History ==
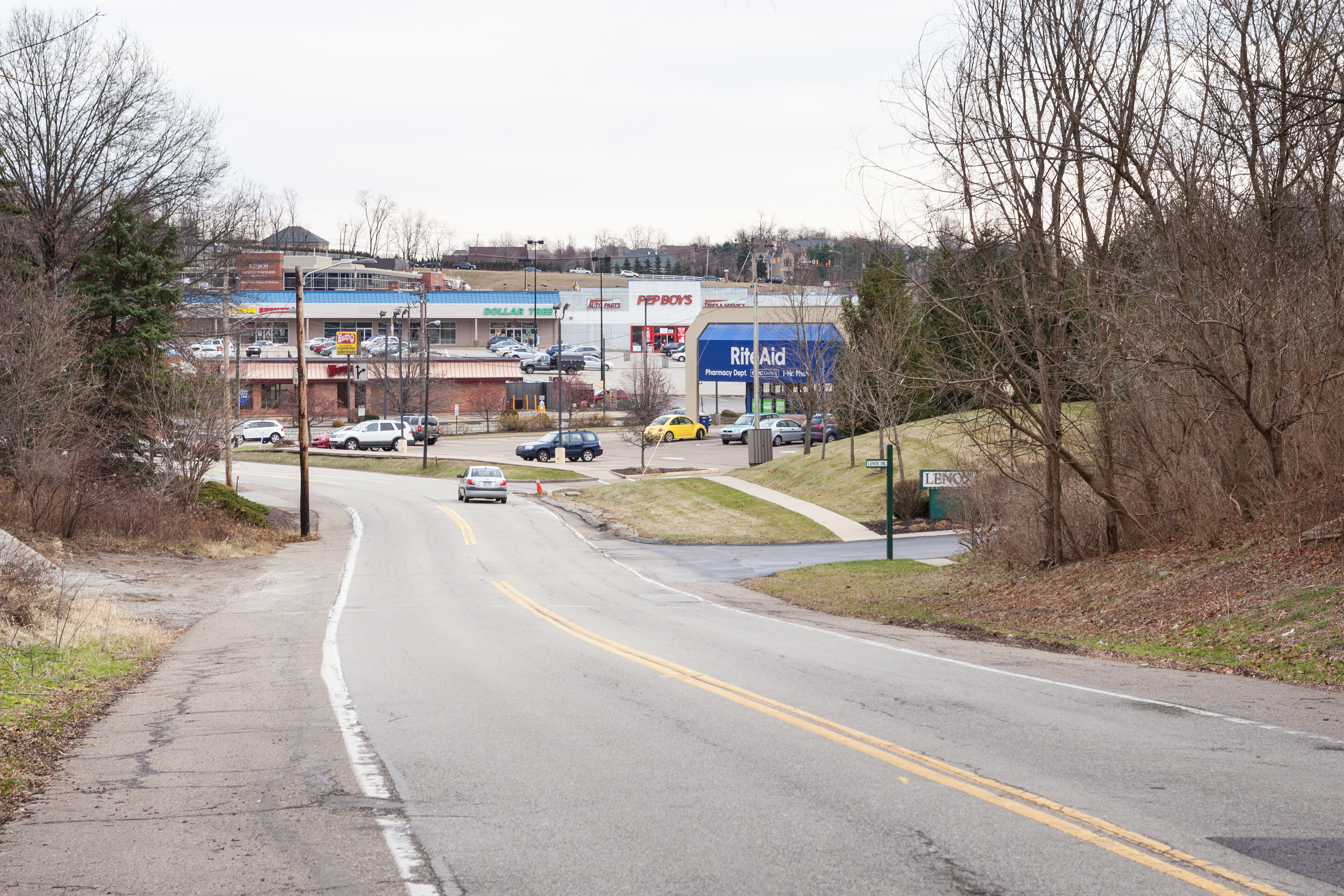
An eastbound car is near the location of the first US armored car robbery.

The area that is now Bethel Park was originally settled around 1800 and was established as Bethel Township in 1886. It was named after Bethel Presbyterian Church, which in turn was named after the ancient Israelite sanctuary of Bethel. Bethel Park was incorporated as a borough on March 17, 1949.

The completion of the Pittsburgh Railways Interurbans in the early 1900s opened up Bethel Park to accelerated growth and development, making the area an early example of a streetcar suburb. While most of the Pittsburgh area's passenger rail and streetcar services were discontinued in the 1950s and 1960s, and further growth was fueled by automobiles, the trolley lines through Bethel Park were kept in service and upgraded to modern light rail standards in the 1980s.

The first armored car robbery in the U.S. occurred in Bethel Park on March 11, 1927, when a Brinks truck was attacked while heading towards the Coverdale Mine about a mile away. Paul Jaworski and the Flathead gang destroyed the road with dynamite to steal a mining payroll.

== Geography ==
According to the U.S. Census Bureau, the borough had a total area of 11.7 square miles (30 km^{2}), all land. Its average elevation is 1,197 feet (365 m) above sea level. Bethel Park lies at the margin between the Pittsburgh Low Plateau and Waynesburg Hills Sections of the Allegheny Plateau physiographic province. The area is characterized as a maturely dissected region where the ephemeral minor tributaries converge into the tributaries of principal streams.

The highest point in Bethel Park is Rocky Ridge, in the southwestern portion of the borough, 1,370 feet (420 m), and the lowest point is at the intersection of the Piney Fork and Alsip Run creeks, 980 feet (300 m), in the southeast corner. Bethel Park has seven borders, including Castle Shannon to the north, Whitehall to the north-northeast, Baldwin to the northeast, South Park to the east and southeast, Peters Township in Washington County to the south, Upper St. Clair to the west, and Mt. Lebanon to the north-northwest.

=== Geology ===
The exposed rocks in Bethel Park are mostly composed of sandstone, limestone, shale, and a few coal layers (Redstone, Waynesburg, Washington, etc.). The ages of the exposed rocks bracket the late Pennsylvanian epoch (Gzhelian age; approximately 303 million years ago) near the lowest elevations, and Early Permian period (Asselian age; approximately 297 million years ago) near the highest parts of the southern part of Bethel Park (e.g. Rocky Ridge). These sedimentary rocks were deposited as the sea level rose and fell along an ancient coastline (with the region alternating between delta, shallow lake, and shallow sea), and finally being uplifted with the formation of the Appalachian Mountains.

Bethel Park is underlain by the Pennsylvania-age Monongahela Formation. The Monongahela Formation consists of the Uniontown member and the underlying Pittsburgh member, and the base is the Pittsburgh coal seam. Much of southern Allegheny County is undermined, and the PADEP indicates that all of Bethel Park was undermined.

A portion of the area is underlain by the Pittsburgh Terminal No. 8 Mine (Cortis and others, 1975), which was commonly known as the "H" Mine and the Coverdale Mine. The mine opened around 1920. The historic operations of the Coverdale Mine are apparent on a Bridgeville 7.5-minute topographic map. A "Mine Dump" is shown adjacent to the Montour Railroad tracks and South Park Road. Coal was mined through vertical shafts accessing inclined slopes following the dip of the Pittsburgh coal seam. Mine voids in the inclined slope resulted from the practice of room and pillar mining during the early 20th century. The Coverdale Mine is closed and largely unflooded.

== Demographics ==
Historical population
| Census | Pop. | Note | %± |
|---|---|---|---|
| 1950 | 11,324 | | — |
| 1960 | 23,650 | | 108.8% |
| 1970 | 34,758 | | 47.0% |
| 1980 | 34,755 | | 0.0% |
| 1990 | 33,823 | | −2.7% |
| 2000 | 33,556 | | −0.8% |
| 2010 | 32,313 | | −3.7% |
| 2020 | 33,577 | | 3.9% |

At the 2020 census, there were 33,556 people, 13,362 households, and 9,540 families living in the Municipality. The population density was 2,869.8 inhabitants per square mile (1,108.0/km^{2}). There were 13,871 housing units at an average density of 1,186.3 per square mile (458.0/km^{2}). The racial makeup of the borough was 97.10% White, 1.02% African American, 0.03% Native American, 1.11% Asian, 0.03% Pacific Islander, 0.13% from other races, and 0.58% from two or more races. Hispanic or Latino of any race were 0.49%.

There were 13,362 households, 30.3% had children under the age of 18 living with them, 62.0% were married couples living together, 7.2% had a female householder with no husband present, and 28.6% were non-families. 26.1% of households were made up of individuals, and 12.0% were one person aged 65 or older. The average household size was 2.48 and the average family size was 3.01.

The age distribution was 23.7% under the age of 18, 5.0% from 18 to 24, 26.8% from 25 to 44, 26.5% from 45 to 64, and 18.1% 65 or older. The median age was 42 years. For every 100 females there were 91.9 males. For every 100 females age 18 and over, there were 87.7 males.

The median household income was $53,791 and the median family income was $64,390. Males had a median income of $47,876 versus $32,351 for females. The per capita income for the borough was $25,867. About 2.5% of families and 3.7% of the population were below the poverty line, including 4.1% of those under age 18 and 3.8% of those age 65 or over.

== Arts and culture ==
Bethel Presbyterian Church is Bethel Park's namesake. Its origins date to 1776 when John McMillan, the first Presbyterian missionary west of the Allegheny Mountains, held services in the area. The modern incarnation of the church was incorporated in 1907. South Hills Village is a two-level shopping mall in the borough.

== Government and politics ==
The Municipality's home rule status provides Bethel Park with greater powers of governance than the default form of borough government. It is divided into nine wards of approximately equal population, each electing one member of the Bethel Park Municipal Council, and all together electing the mayor at large. Both the mayor and the council member serve four-year terms. Each council member is required to reside in the ward that they represent.

Eliza Griswold of The New Yorker described the municipality as "a politically and economically mixed community" with varying sizes and amenities in the housing.

== Education ==
The school district is Bethel Park School District. The district's comprehensive high school is Bethel Park High School.

== Transportation ==
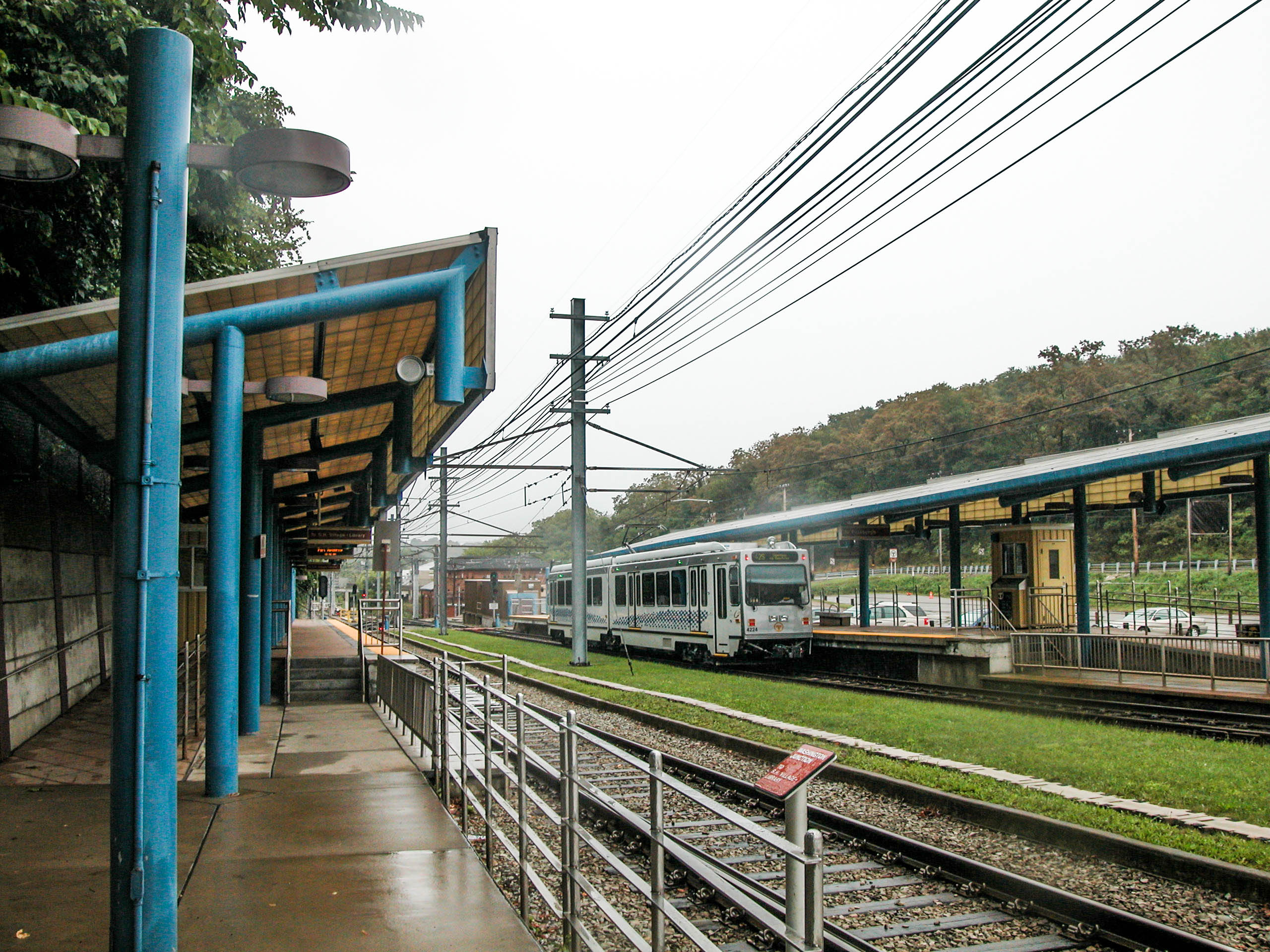
Washington Junction station

All three of Pittsburgh Regional Transit's light rail lines run through Bethel Park, with the Blue and Red lines terminating at South Hills Village, and the Silver Line passing through the central business district to its terminus in Library. Park-and-ride lots at South Hills Village, West Library, Lytle, and Washington Junction provide local commuters with an easy trip to Pittsburgh. In addition to light rail service, Port Authority's 36 Banksville and Mid Mon Valley Transit Authority's Commuter A routes provide bus service through the commercial areas of the borough.

Pennsylvania Route 88 and U.S. Route 19 run through Bethel Park, with much of the area's busy commercial developments along the two corridors. The Yellow and Orange Belts of the Allegheny County belt system serve the borough, with the Orange Belt terminating in the southeast corner near the border with South Park. Interstate 79 and the Mon-Fayette Expressway do not enter Bethel Park but are both within a 15-minute drive from the borough. The cancelled South Hills Expressway was planned to be constructed along the Route 88 corridor.

== Notable people ==
- Terry K. Amthor, game designer
- Thomas Crooks, attempted assassin of Donald Trump
- Barbara Feldon, actress
- Armen Gilliam, basketball player
- Scott Hahn, Catholic theologian
- Nick Kwiatkoski, American football player
- Mason Miller, baseball player
- Steve Moakler, musician
- Weird Paul Petroskey, lo-fi musician and a YouTube personality
- Steve Previs, basketball player
- Rick Sebak, American Television Producer
- Joe Serafini, actor
- Tom Skladany, American football player
- Mike Westhoff, American football coach
- Richard White, actor
- Brian Young, drummer / music producer
