= Castle Shannon, Pennsylvania =

Borough in Pennsylvania, US

- Borough
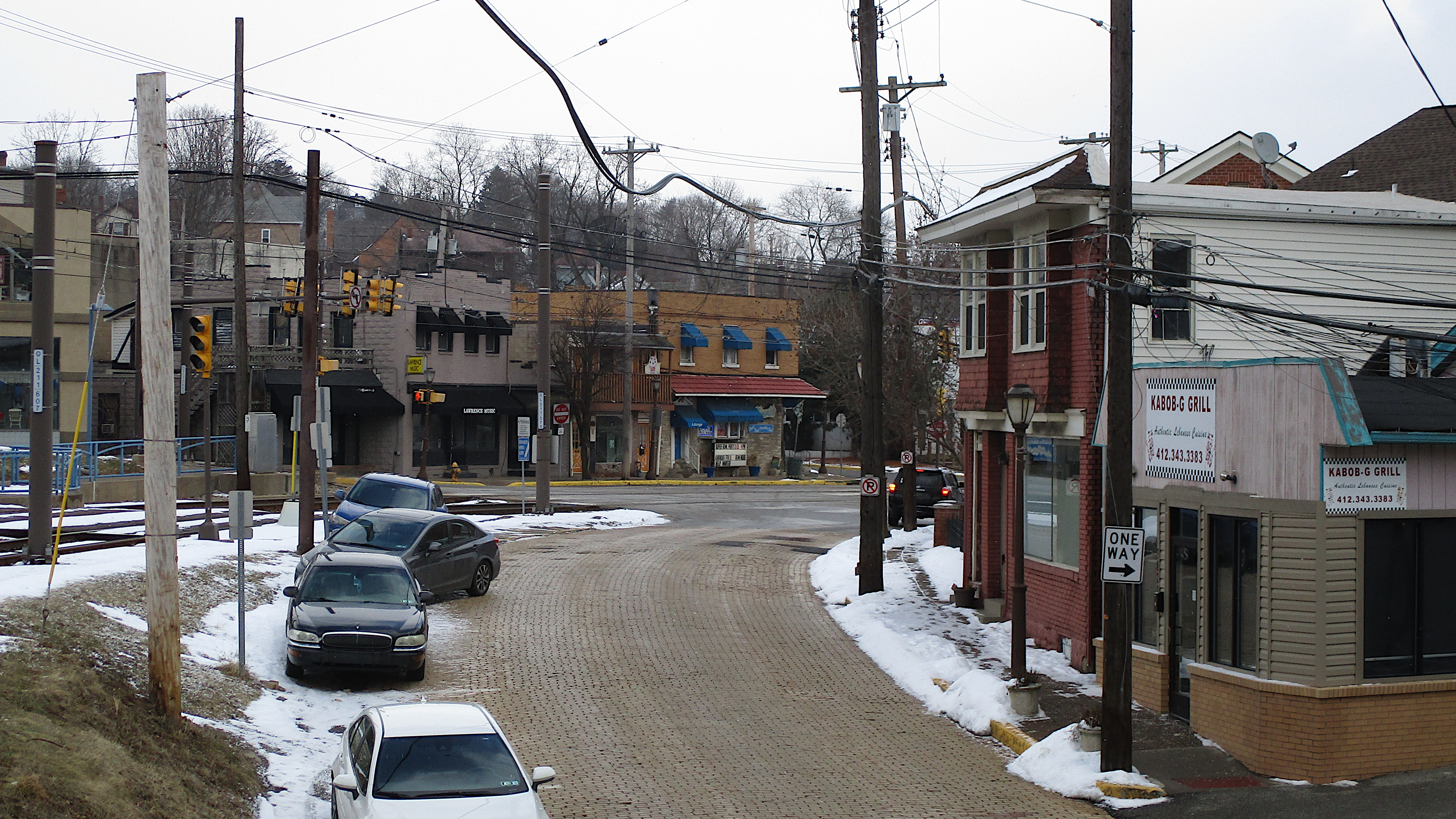
- Willow Avenue at Castle Shannon Boulevard
- Etymology: Local farm named "Castle Shanahan"
- Nickname: "Shannon"
- Location in Allegheny County and the U.S. state of Pennsylvania.
- Coordinates: 40°21′57″N 80°1′11″W
- Country: United States
- State: Pennsylvania
- County: Allegheny
- Incorporated: December 20, 1919

Government
  - Mayor: Donald J. Baumgarten (D)

Area
  - Total: 1.60 sq mi (4.14 km^{2})
  - Land: 1.60 sq mi (4.14 km^{2})
  - Water: 0 sq mi (0.00 km^{2})
- Elevation: 1,040 ft (320 m)

Population (2020)
  - Total: 8,249
  - Density: 5,162.9/sq mi (1,993.39/km^{2})
- Time zone: UTC-5 (EST)
  - Summer (DST): UTC-4 (EDT)
- ZIP Code: 15234
- Area code: 412
- FIPS code: 42-11680
- School District: Keystone Oaks
- Website: https://www.csboro.org/

Castle Shannon is a borough in Allegheny County, Pennsylvania, United States. The population was 8,249 at the 2020 census. It is part of the Pittsburgh metropolitan area.

== History ==
The first families settled Castle Shannon in 1786 in pursuit of farmland and timber and is widely assumed to be the Haas family. The most prominent farm was owned by David Strawbridge. Following common practices of Irish settlers—primarily from Ulster—in the region to name places and farms after former or ancestral homes in Ireland, he named it Castle Shanahan. Castleshanaghan is a townland in County Donegal, Ireland. Over time, the farm would lend its name to the area, as "Shanahan" would evolve into "Shannon". In 1872, the Pittsburgh and Castle Shannon Railroad line was completed, providing a direct link from Pittsburgh to the then-village of Castle Shannon. Development was stimulated by two years of free transportation and lumber transport given to anybody building a home.

In 1877, a second railroad was built from Finleyville through Castle Shannon to the West End neighborhood of Pittsburgh. In 1909, the right of way through the valley containing Castle Shannon was purchased by the Pittsburgh Railroad. This helped lead to Castle Shannon becoming a center for coal mining, with eight mines in operation in 1904. The Pittsburgh and West Virginia Railroad, still active today, came shortly afterward.

The First National Bank in Castle Shannon was the site of a much publicized bank robbery in 1917. $18,500 was taken in the robbery, of which $10,500 was immediately recovered from one man shot during the escape. The full sum was never recovered. A group of men gathered to chase down the robber to no avail. From that group, Elmer J Zeiler, a WWI Medal of Valor winner from the US and France, and a double Purple Heart recipient, was named the first Chief of Police in Castle Shannon when the police department was formed.

Castle Shannon was incorporated as a borough in 1919, formed from parts of Baldwin Township, Mt. Lebanon, and Bethel Township.

== Geography ==
According to the United States Census Bureau, the borough has a total area of 1.6 square miles (4.1 km^{2}), all land. Its average elevation is 1,040 feet (320 m) above sea level.

=== Surrounding communities ===
Castle Shannon has five borders, including Baldwin Township to the north, the Pittsburgh neighborhood of Overbrook to the northeast, Whitehall to the east and southeast, Bethel Park to the south and southwest, and Mt. Lebanon to the west and northwest.

== Demographics ==
Historical population
Census	Pop.	Note	%±
1880	306		—
1920	2,353		—
1930	3,810		61.9%
1940	3,970		4.2%
1950	5,459		37.5%
1960	11,836		116.8%
1970	12,036		1.7%
1980	10,164		−15.6%
1990	9,135		−10.1%
2000	8,556		−6.3%
2010	8,316		−2.8%
2020	8,249		−0.8%

As of the census of 2000, there were 8,556 people, 3,859 households, and 2,288 families residing in the borough. The population density was 5,259.8 inhabitants per square mile (2,030.8/km^{2}). There were 4,037 housing units at an average density of 2,481.8 per square mile (958.2/km^{2}). The racial makeup of the borough was 96.91% White, 1.34% African American, 0.06% Native American, 0.78% Asian, 0.01% Pacific Islander, 0.39% from other races, and 0.50% from two or more races. Hispanic or Latino of any race were 0.98% of the population.

There were 3,859 households, out of which 23.2% had children under age 18 living with them, 45.3% were married couples living together, 10.7% had a female householder with no husband present, and 40.7% were non-families. 35.1% of all households were made up of individuals, and 12.5% had someone living alone who was 65 years old or older. The average household size was 2.20 persons, and the average family size was 2.88 persons. In the borough the population was spread out, with 19.7% under age 18, 7.3% from 18 to 24 years old, 32.9% from 25 to 44 years old, 21.4% from 45 to 64 years old, and 18.7% who were 65 years old or older. The median age was 39. For every 100 females, there were 90.0 males. For every 100 females age 18 and over, there were 85.5 males. The median income for a household in the borough was $38,040; and, the median income for a family was $48,586. Males had a median income of $33,013, versus $27,907 for females. The per capita income for the borough was $20,518. About 5.0% of families and 7.7% of the population were below the poverty line, including 9.4% of those under age 18 and 7.8% of those age 65 or over.

== Government and politics ==
Presidential Elections Results
Year	Republican	Democratic	Third Parties
2020	41% 2,014	58% 2,844	1% 56
2016	42% 1,823	53% 2,292	4% 188
2012	44% 1,738	55% 2,180	1% 37

== Schools ==
The school district that covers most of Castle Shannon, Keystone Oaks School District, is a "jointure" with the boroughs of Dormont and Green Tree, comprising Keystone Oaks Middle and High Schools, Myrtle Elementary School (Castle Shannon), Dormont Elementary School (Dormont), and Aiken Elementary School (Greentree).

A portion of Castle Shannon is zoned to Bethel Park School District. That district's comprehensive high school is Bethel Park High School.

Located within Castle Shannon is Saint Anne School, a Catholic private elementary school.

== Notable people ==
- Daniel DiNardo, cardinal of the Catholic Church, archbishop of the Archdiocese of Galveston-Houston; spent his childhood years in Castle Shannon and attended St. Anne Elementary School
- Lee Hartman, animator
- Dennis Miller, comedian, grew up in Castle Shannon and attended St. Anne Elementary School and Keystone Oaks High School

Preceded by Dormont	Bordering communities of Pittsburgh	Succeeded by Whitehall
