= Bethel Park School District =

School district in Pennsylvania, USA

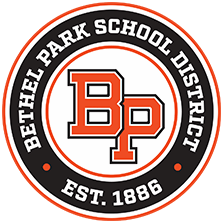

Address
- 301 Church Road Bethel Park, Allegheny, Pennsylvania, 15102-1696; United States
- Coordinates: 40.31696°N 80.04158°W

District information
- Type: Public
- Motto: Built on tradition, focused on the future
- Grades: K–12
- Established: June 21, 1886; 139 years ago
- Superintendent: Matthew Patterson
- School board: 9
- Chair of the board: Buffie Faes
- Governing agency: Pennsylvania Department of Education
- Schools: 8
- Budget: $91 million
- NCES District ID: 4203510
- District ID: PA-103021252

Students and staff
- Students: 3,937 (2022–23)
- Faculty: 306.17 (on an FTE basis)
- Staff: 354.23 (on an FTE basis)
- Student–teacher ratio: 12.86:1
- Athletic conference: WPIAL, PIAA
- District mascot: Black Hawks
- Colors: Black and orange

Other information
- Website: bpsd.org

The Bethel Park School District is a large, suburban school district in Allegheny County, Pennsylvania, United States. The district covers the Municipality of Bethel Park and a portion of the borough of Castle Shannon, suburbs of Pittsburgh. Bethel Park School District encompasses approximately 12 square miles (31 km^{2}). According to 2000 federal census data, it serves a resident population of 33,556. In 2009, the residents' per capita income was $25,768, while the median family income was $64,140.

Map of Allegheny County, Pennsylvania school districts

Bethel Park School District operates 8 schools. The 5 elementary schools are Benjamin Franklin Elementary, Abraham Lincoln Elementary, Memorial Elementary, William Penn Elementary and George Washington Elementary. Five elementary schools host grades K-4, and students are assigned to a specific school based on the proximity of their home to that school. After 4th grade, all children in Bethel Park attend the same school as the other children in their grade; the two middle schools and single high school are community-wide.

The two middle schools in the district are Neil Armstrong Middle School for grades 5-6 and Independence Middle School for grades 7-8. Bethel Park High School is home to grades 9-12.

The district borders six other school districts: Baldwin-Whitehall, Keystone Oaks, Mt. Lebanon, Peters Township (Washington County), South Park, and Upper St. Clair.

== Extracurricular activities ==
The district offers a variety of clubs, activities, and sports. There are many sports programs: 27 varsity, 17 junior varsity, 9 freshman and 14 middle school teams, and six club sports. Bethel Park School District funds 12 clubs and activities available to students at the middle schools and over 20 at the high school. The high school produces a fall play and spring musical, in which more than 150 students regularly participate.
