= Green Tree, Pennsylvania =

Borough in Pennsylvania, US

- Borough
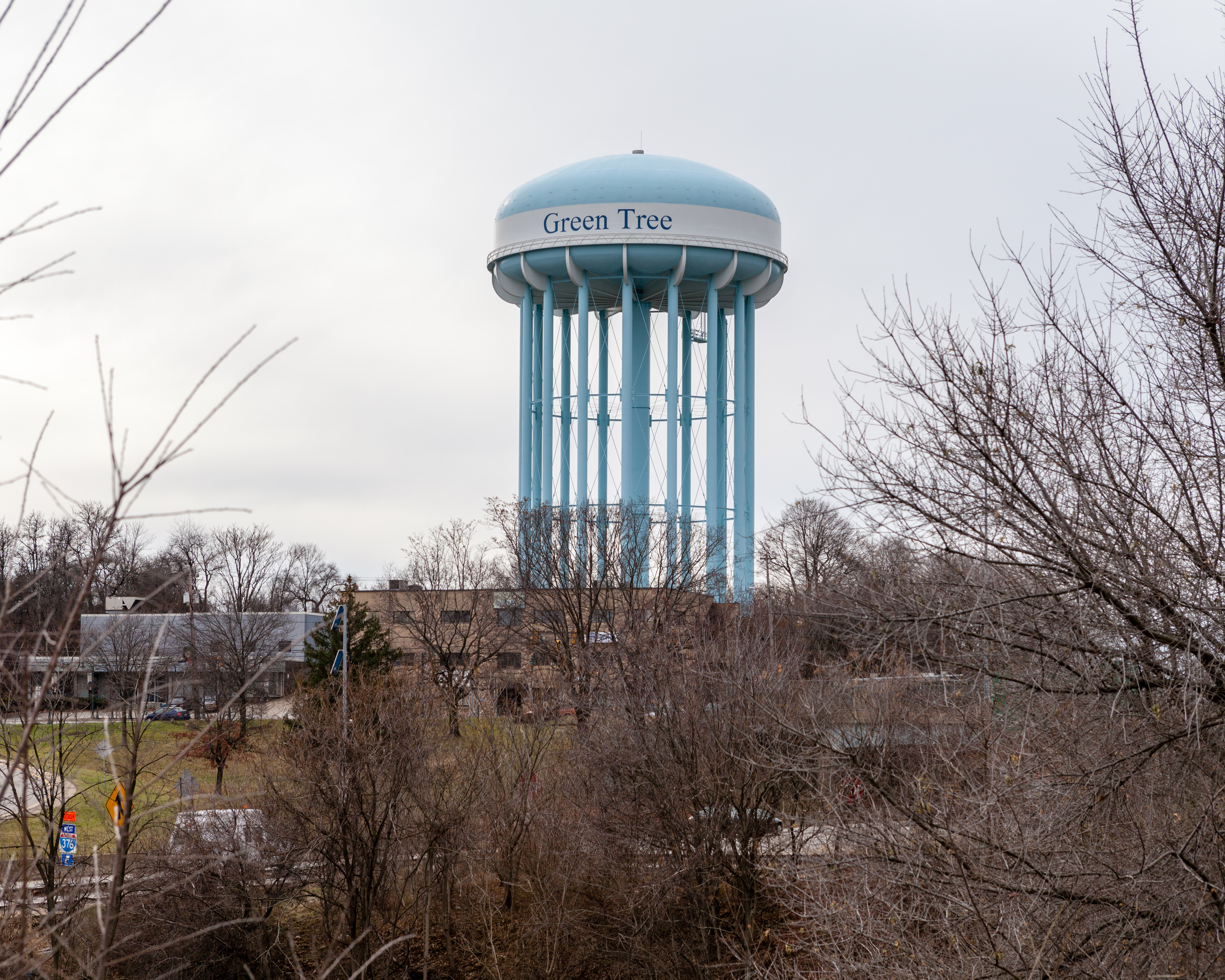
- Water tower, visible throughout the borough and surrounding areas

- Flag Seal

- Location in Allegheny County and the state of Pennsylvania.
- Coordinates: 40°24′54″N 80°2′59″W
- Country: United States
- State: Pennsylvania
- County: Allegheny County

Area
  - Total: 2.08 sq mi (5.38 km^{2})
  - Land: 2.08 sq mi (5.38 km^{2})
  - Water: 0 sq mi (0.00 km^{2})

Population (2020)
  - Total: 4,941
  - Density: 2,380.7/sq mi (919.21/km^{2})
- Time zone: UTC-5 (EST)
  - Summer (DST): UTC-4 (EDT)
- FIPS code: 42-31256
- Website: www.greentreeboro.com

Green Tree is a borough in Allegheny County, Pennsylvania, United States. The population was 4,941 at the 2020 census. It is a suburb of the Pittsburgh metropolitan area. Green Tree is connected to Pittsburgh via the Fort Pitt Tunnel.

== History ==
Settled in 1793, the area stayed rural until the late 1800s, with paintings of the time showing farmland and a vineyard. The borough, chartered in 1885, is named after "a large sycamore tree along Greentree Road where the stagecoaches would deliver mail," according to The Historical Society of Green Tree. Rook Station on the Wabash Pittsburgh Terminal Railway opened in 1904 which heralded an industrialisation of the area and the opening of a railroad yard and roundhouse.

== Geography ==
Green Tree is located at 40°24′54″N 80°2′59″W (40.414969, −80.049800).

According to the United States Census Bureau, the borough has a total area of 2.1 square miles (5.4 km^{2}), all land.

=== Surrounding communities ===
Green Tree has six borders, five with Pittsburgh neighborhoods: Oakwood and Westwood to the north, Ridgemont to the northeast, Banksville to the east, and East Carnegie to the west. The other border is with Scott Township to the south.

== Demographics ==
Historical population
Census	Pop.	Note	%±
1890	685		—
1900	678		−1.0%
1910	1,143		68.6%
1920	1,043		−8.7%
1930	1,457		39.7%
1940	1,880		29.0%
1950	2,818		49.9%
1960	5,226		85.5%
1970	6,441		23.2%
1980	5,722		−11.2%
1990	4,905		−14.3%
2000	4,719		−3.8%
2010	4,432		−6.1%
2020	4,941		11.5%

=== 2020 census ===
As of the 2020 census, Green Tree had a population of 4,941. The median age was 42.0 years. 16.1% of residents were under the age of 18 and 21.6% of residents were 65 years of age or older. For every 100 females there were 96.1 males, and for every 100 females age 18 and over there were 98.3 males age 18 and over.

100.0% of residents lived in urban areas, while 0.0% lived in rural areas.

There were 2,303 households in Green Tree, of which 20.4% had children under the age of 18 living in them. Of all households, 46.8% were married-couple households, 21.4% were households with a male householder and no spouse or partner present, and 25.8% were households with a female householder and no spouse or partner present. About 34.7% of all households were made up of individuals and 13.3% had someone living alone who was 65 years of age or older.

There were 2,445 housing units, of which 5.8% were vacant. The homeowner vacancy rate was 1.3% and the rental vacancy rate was 9.2%.

Racial composition as of the 2020 census
Race	Number	Percent
White	4,208	85.2%
Black or African American	147	3.0%
American Indian and Alaska Native	1	0.0%
Asian	312	6.3%
Native Hawaiian and Other Pacific Islander	0	0.0%
Some other race	39	0.8%
Two or more races	234	4.7%
Hispanic or Latino (of any race)	117	2.4%

=== 2000 census ===
As of the 2000 census, there were 4,719 people, 1,974 households, and 1,383 families residing in the borough. The population density was 2,247.7 inhabitants per square mile (867.8/km^{2}). There were 2,026 housing units at an average density of 965.0 per square mile (372.6/km^{2}). The racial makeup of the borough was 96.21% White, 0.53% African American, 1.95% Asian, 0.04% from other races, and 1.27% from two or more races. Hispanic or Latino of any race were 0.66% of the population. 22.0% were of German, 20.5% Irish, 16.4% Italian, 8.9% Polish and 7.8% English ancestry.

There were 1,974 households, out of which 24.2% had children under the age of 18 living with them, 60.1% were married couples living together, 6.8% had a female householder with no husband present, and 29.9% were non-families. 26.2% of all households were made up of individuals, and 11.7% had someone living alone who was 65 years of age or older. The average household size was 2.39 and the average family size was 2.89.

In the borough the population was spread out, with 19.4% under the age of 18, 5.6% from 18 to 24, 25.6% from 25 to 44, 27.9% from 45 to 64, and 21.4% who were 65 years of age or older. The median age was 45 years. For every 100 females, there were 91.2 males. For every 100 females age 18 and over, there were 88.1 males.

The median income for a household in the borough was $54,159, and the median income for a family was $63,814. Males had a median income of $42,304 versus $33,438 for females. The per capita income for the borough was $27,480. About 1.7% of families and 2.8% of the population were below the poverty line, including 3.1% of those under age 18 and 3.4% of those age 65 or over.

== Economy ==
Wexford Health Sources has its headquarters in Foster Plaza Two in Green Tree.

The U.S. Department of the Interior's Office of Surface Mining has its Appalachian Regional Coordination Center, including the Pittsburgh Field office and the National Mine Map Repository, in Three Parkway Center in Green Tree.

== Government and politics ==
Presidential election results
Year	Republican	Democratic	Third parties
2020	43% 1,412	54% 1,760	1% 42
2016	45% 1,311	51% 1,459	4% 115
2012	50% 1,327	49% 1,287	1% 26

== Notable people ==
- Ron Paul, politician
- Zachary Quinto, actor, Star Trek / Heroes
- Jeff Wilke, businessman and Amazon executive

Preceded by Carnegie	Bordering communities of Pittsburgh	Succeeded by Dormont
