= List of PIAA football state champions =

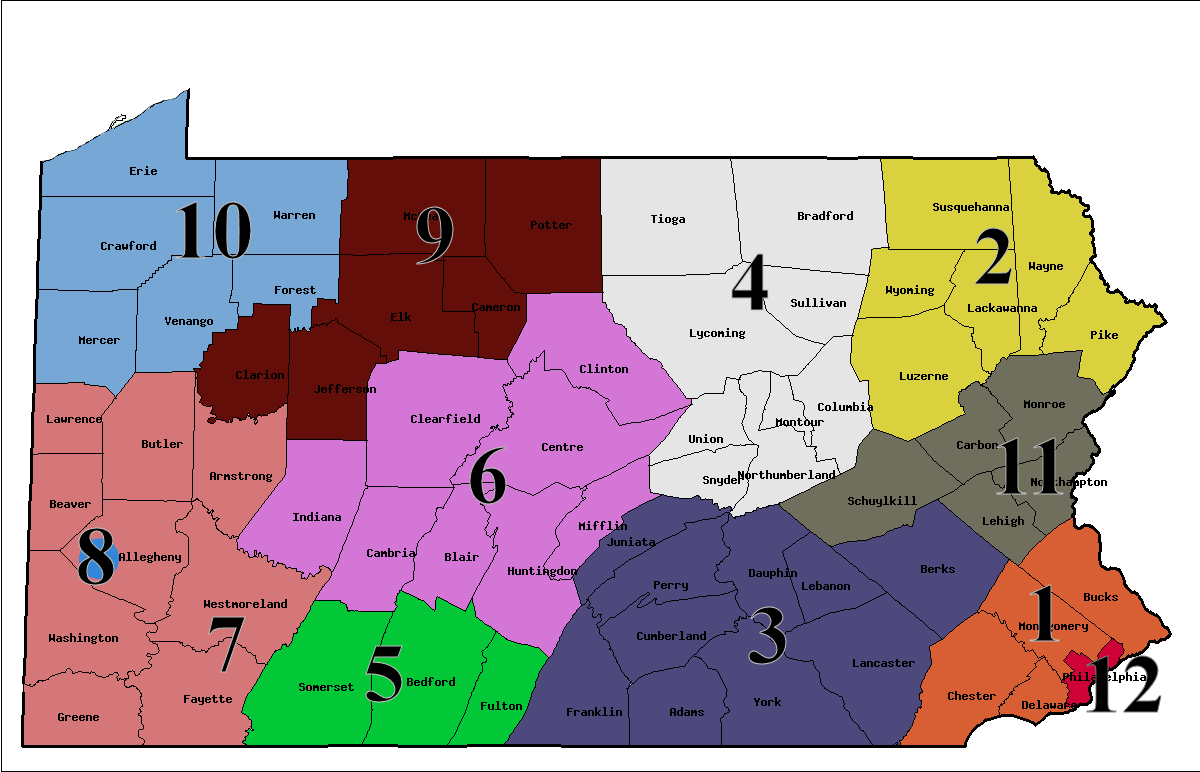
PIAA district map

The following is a list of Pennsylvania state high school football championships sanctioned by the Pennsylvania Interscholastic Athletic Association (PIAA) since 1988. This list is organized by the six classes the schools are organized by: Class A (1A), Class AA (2A), Class AAA (3A), Class AAAA (4A), Class AAAAA (5A) and Class AAAAAA (6A). The classes are based on school enrollment, as smaller schools are generally part of Classes 1A and 2A, and larger schools are generally part of Classes 5A and 6A.

== Class 1A ==
Year	Champion	District	Runner-up	Score	Site
1988	Camp Hill	3	Cambridge Springs	18–7	Shippensburg University
1989	Dunmore	2	Keystone	57–18	Memorial Stadium, Middletown
1990	Marian Catholic	11	Farrell	21–13	Memorial Stadium, Middletown
1991	Schuylkill Haven	11	Rochester Area	28–18	Memorial Stadium, Wilkes-Barre
1992	Scotland School	3	Smethport Area	24–7	Mansion Park Stadium, Altoona
1993	Duquesne	7	South Williamsport	24–21	Mansion Park Stadium, Altoona
1994	Southern Columbia	4	Western Beaver	49–6	Mansion Park Stadium, Altoona
1995	Farrell	7	Southern Columbia	6–0	Mansion Park Stadium, Altoona
1996	Farrell (2)	7	Southern Columbia	14–12	Mansion Park Stadium, Altoona
1997	Sharpsville	10	Riverside	10–7	Mansion Park Stadium, Altoona
1998	Rochester Area	7	Southern Columbia	18–0	Hersheypark Stadium
1999	South Side	7	Southern Columbia	27–21	Hersheypark Stadium
2000	Rochester Area (2)	7	Southern Columbia	22–14	Hersheypark Stadium
2001	Rochester Area (3)	7	Southern Columbia	16–0	Hersheypark Stadium
2002	Southern Columbia (2)	4	Rochester Area	31–6	Hersheypark Stadium
2003	Southern Columbia (3)	4	Bishop Carroll	49–20	Hersheypark Stadium
2004	Southern Columbia (4)	4	Rochester Area	35–0	Hersheypark Stadium
2005	Southern Columbia (5)	4	Duquesne	50–19	Hersheypark Stadium
2006	Southern Columbia (6)	4	West Middlesex	56–14	Hersheypark Stadium
2007	Steelton-Highspire	3	Serra Catholic	34–15	Hersheypark Stadium
2008	Steelton-Highspire (2)	3	Clairton	35–16	Hersheypark Stadium
2009	Clairton	7	Bishop McCort	15–3	Hersheypark Stadium
2010	Clairton (2)	7	Riverside	36–30	Hersheypark Stadium
2011	Clairton (3)	7	Southern Columbia	35–19	Hersheypark Stadium
2012	Clairton (4)	7	Dunmore	20–0	Hersheypark Stadium
2013	North Catholic	7	Old Forge	15–14 (OT)	Hersheypark Stadium
2014	Bishop Guilfoyle	6	Clairton	19–18	Hersheypark Stadium
2015	Bishop Guilfoyle (2)	6	Farrell	35–0	Hersheypark Stadium
2016	Bishop Guilfoyle (3)	6	Clairton	17–0	Hersheypark Stadium
2017	Jeannette	7	Homer-Center	42–12	Hersheypark Stadium
2018	Farrell (3)	10	Lackawanna Trail	55–20	Hersheypark Stadium
2019	Farrell (4)	10	Bishop Guilfoyle	10–7	Hersheypark Stadium
2020	Steelton-Highspire (3)	3	Jeannette	32–20	Hersheypark Stadium
2021	Bishop Guilfoyle (4)	6	Redbank Valley	21–14	Hersheypark Stadium
2022	Steelton-Highspire (4)	3	Union	22–8	Chapman Field, Cumberland Valley
2023	Steelton-Highspire (5)	3	Fort Cherry	40–8	Chapman Field, Cumberland Valley
2024	Bishop Guilfoyle (5)	6	Port Allegany	41–22	Chapman Field, Cumberland Valley
2025	Clairton (5)	7	Bishop Guilfoyle	35–3	Chapman Field, Cumberland Valley

== Class 2A ==
Year	Champion	District	Runner-up	Score	Site
1988	Bethlehem Catholic	11	Wilmington Area	26–11	Mansion Park Stadium, Altoona
1989	Hickory	10	Montoursville Area	30–22	Memorial Stadium, Middletown
1990	Hanover Area	2	Canevin Catholic	20–19 (OT)	Memorial Stadium, Middletown
1991	Aliquippa	7	Hanover Area	27–0	South Stadium
1992	Valley View	2	East Allegheny	21–13	Mansion Park Stadium, Altoona
1993	Dallas	2	Washington	31–7	Mansion Park Stadium, Altoona
1994	Mount Carmel Area	4	Forest Hills	20–14 (OT)	Mansion Park Stadium, Altoona
1995	Bishop McDevitt	3	Burrell	29–0	Mansion Park Stadium, Altoona
1996	Mount Carmel Area (2)	4	Tyrone Area	25–6	Mansion Park Stadium, Altoona
1997	South Park	7	South Williamsport	20–0	Mansion Park Stadium, Altoona
1998	Mount Carmel Area (3)	4	Shady Side Academy	44–7	Hersheypark Stadium
1999	Tyrone Area	6	Mount Carmel Area	13–6	Hersheypark Stadium
2000	Mount Carmel Area (4)	4	Aliquippa	26–6	Hersheypark Stadium
2001	Washington	7	Pen Argyl	19–12	Hersheypark Stadium
2002	Mount Carmel Area (5)	4	Seton La Salle	18–13	Hersheypark Stadium
2003	Aliquippa (2)	7	Northern Lehigh	32–27	Hersheypark Stadium
2004	Lansdale Catholic	1	Grove City	40–17	Hersheypark Stadium
2005	South Park (2)	7	Wilson Area	28–17	Hersheypark Stadium
2006	Wilson Area	11	Jeannette	29–28	Hersheypark Stadium
2007	Jeannette	7	Dunmore	49–21	Hersheypark Stadium
2008	Wilmington Area	10	West Catholic	35–34 (2OT)	Hersheypark Stadium
2009	Lancaster Catholic	3	Greensburg Central Catholic	21–14	Hersheypark Stadium
2010	West Catholic	12	South Fayette	50–14	Hersheypark Stadium
2011	Lancaster Catholic (2)	3	Tyrone Area	17–7	Hersheypark Stadium
2012	Wyomissing	3	Aliquippa	17–14	Hersheypark Stadium
2013	South Fayette	7	Imhotep Charter	41–0	Hersheypark Stadium
2014	South Fayette (2)	7	Dunmore	28–16	Hersheypark Stadium
2015	Southern Columbia (7)	4	Aliquippa	49–14	Hersheypark Stadium
2016	Steel Valley	7	Southern Columbia	49–7	Hersheypark Stadium
2017	Southern Columbia (8)	4	Wilmington Area	48–0	Hersheypark Stadium
2018	Southern Columbia (9)	4	Wilmington Area	49–14	Hersheypark Stadium
2019	Southern Columbia (10)	4	Avonworth	74–7	Hersheypark Stadium
2020	Southern Columbia (11)	4	Wilmington Area	42–14	Hersheypark Stadium
2021	Southern Columbia (12)	4	Serra Catholic	62–25	Hersheypark Stadium
2022	Southern Columbia (13)	4	Westinghouse	37–22	Chapman Field, Cumberland Valley
2023	Southern Columbia (14)	4	Westinghouse	21–20	Chapman Field, Cumberland Valley
2024	Troy	4	Clarion	25–24	Chapman Field, Cumberland Valley
2025	Southern Columbia (15)	4	Farrell	43–22	Chapman Field, Cumberland Valley

== Class 3A ==
Year	Champion	District	Runner-up	Score	Site
1988	Berwick Area	2	Aliquippa	13–0	Hersheypark Stadium
1989	Perry Traditional Academy	8	Berwick Area	20–8	Hersheypark Stadium
1990	Bethlehem Catholic	11	Seton-La Salle	43–7	Hersheypark Stadium
1991	Strong Vincent	10	Conestoga Valley	29–20	Lackawanna County Stadium
1992	Berwick Area (2)	2	Blackhawk	33–6	Mansion Park Stadium, Altoona
1993	Allentown Central Catholic	11	Blackhawk	40–0	Mansion Park Stadium, Altoona
1994	Berwick Area (3)	2	Sharon Area	27–7	Mansion Park Stadium, Altoona
1995	Berwick Area (4)	2	Sharon Area	43–6	Mansion Park Stadium, Altoona
1996	Berwick Area (5)	2	Blackhawk	34–13	Mansion Park Stadium, Altoona
1997	Berwick Area (6)	2	Perry Traditional Academy	17–14	Mansion Park Stadium, Altoona
1998	Allentown Central Catholic (2)	11	Moon Area	10–0	Hersheypark Stadium
1999	Strath Haven	1	West Allegheny	21–7	Hersheypark Stadium
2000	Strath Haven (2)	1	West Allegheny	31–28	Hersheypark Stadium
2001	West Allegheny	7	Strath Haven	28–13	Hersheypark Stadium
2002	Hopewell	7	Strath Haven	21–10	Hersheypark Stadium
2003	Manheim Central	3	Pine-Richland	39–38 (OT)	Hersheypark Stadium
2004	Thomas Jefferson	7	Manheim Central	56–20	Hersheypark Stadium
2005	Franklin Regional	7	Pottsville	23–13	Hersheypark Stadium
2006	General McLane High School	10	Pottsville	28–23	Hersheypark Stadium
2007	Thomas Jefferson (2)	7	Garnet Valley	28–3	Hersheypark Stadium
2008	Thomas Jefferson (3)	7	Archbishop Wood	34–7	Hersheypark Stadium
2009	Selinsgrove	4	Manheim Central	10–7	Hersheypark Stadium
2010	Allentown Central Catholic (3)	11	Bishop McDevitt	28–27	Hersheypark Stadium
2011	Archbishop Wood	12	Bishop McDevitt	52–0	Hersheypark Stadium
2012	Cathedral Prep	10	Archbishop Wood	24–14	Hersheypark Stadium
2013	Archbishop Wood (2)	12	Bishop McDevitt	22–10	Hersheypark Stadium
2014	Archbishop Wood (3)	12	Central Valley	33–14	Hersheypark Stadium
2015	Imhotep Charter	12	Cathedral Prep	40–3	Hersheypark Stadium
2016	Beaver Falls	7	Middletown	30–13	Hersheypark Stadium
2017	Quaker Valley	7	Middletown	41–24	Hersheypark Stadium
2018	Aliquippa (3)	7	Middletown	35–0	Hersheypark Stadium
2019	Wyoming Area	2	Central Valley	21–14	Hersheypark Stadium
2020	Central Valley	7	Wyomissing Area	35–21	Hersheypark Stadium
2021	Central Valley (2)	7	Wyomissing Area	7–0	Hersheypark Stadium
2022	Belle Vernon	7	Neumann Goretti	9–8	Chapman Field, Cumberland Valley
2023	Belle Vernon (2)	7	Northwestern Lehigh	38–7	Chapman Field, Cumberland Valley
2024	Northwestern Lehigh	11	Avonworth	36–33 (OT)	Chapman Field, Cumberland Valley
2025	Avonworth	7	Northwestern Lehigh	31–7	Chapman Field, Cumberland Valley

== Class 4A ==
Year	Champion	District	Runner-up	Score	Site
1988	Central Catholic (Pittsburgh)	7	Cedar Cliff	14–7	Pennsylvania State University
1989	Upper St. Clair	7	Wilson	12–7	Hersheypark Stadium
1990	North Allegheny	7	Ridley	21–14	Hersheypark Stadium
1991	Central Bucks West	1	Cathedral Prep	26–14	Mansion Park Stadium, Altoona
1992	Cumberland Valley	3	Upper St. Clair	28–12	Mansion Park Stadium, Altoona
1993	North Hills	7	Central Bucks West	15–14	Mansion Park Stadium, Altoona
1994	McKeesport Area	7	Downingtown Area	17–14	Mansion Park Stadium, Altoona
1995	Penn Hills	7	Lower Dauphin	35–14	Mansion Park Stadium, Altoona
1996	Downingtown Area	1	Woodland Hills	49–14	Mansion Park Stadium, Altoona
1997	Central Bucks West (2)	1	Upper St. Clair	44–20	Mansion Park Stadium, Altoona
1998	Central Bucks West (3)	1	New Castle	56–7	Hersheypark Stadium
1999	Central Bucks West (4)	1	Cathedral Prep	14–13	Hersheypark Stadium
2000	Cathedral Prep	10	Central Bucks West	41–35 (OT)	Hersheypark Stadium
2001	Neshaminy	1	Woodland Hills	21–7	Hersheypark Stadium
2002	Parkland	11	Woodland Hills	34–12	Hersheypark Stadium
2003	North Penn	1	Central Catholic (Pittsburgh)	37–10	Hersheypark Stadium
2004	Central Catholic (Pittsburgh) (2)	7	Neshaminy	49–14	Hersheypark Stadium
2005	McKeesport Area (2)	7	Liberty	49–10	Hersheypark Stadium
2006	Upper St. Clair (2)	7	Liberty	47–13	Hersheypark Stadium
2007	Central Catholic (Pittsburgh) (3)	7	Parkland	21–0	Hersheypark Stadium
2008	Liberty	11	Bethel Park	28–21 (OT)	Hersheypark Stadium
2009	La Salle College	12	State College	24–7	Hersheypark Stadium
2010	North Allegheny (2)	7	La Salle College	21–0	Hersheypark Stadium
2011	Central Dauphin	3	North Penn	14–7	Hersheypark Stadium
2012	North Allegheny (3)	7	Coatesville	63–28	Hersheypark Stadium
2013	St. Joseph's Prep	12	Central Catholic(Pittsburgh)	35–10	Hersheypark Stadium
2014	St. Joseph's Prep (2)	12	Pine-Richland	49–41	Hersheypark Stadium
2015	Central Catholic (Pittsburgh) (4)	7	Parkland	21–18	Hersheypark Stadium
2016	Cathedral Prep (2)	10	Imhotep Charter	27–20	Hersheypark Stadium
2017	Cathedral Prep (3)	10	Imhotep Charter	38–28	Hersheypark Stadium
2018	Cathedral Prep (4)	10	Imhotep Charter	38–7	Hersheypark Stadium
2019	Thomas Jefferson	7	Dallas	46–7	Hersheypark Stadium
2020	Thomas Jefferson (2)	7	Jersey Shore	21–14	Hersheypark Stadium
2021	Aliquippa (4)	7	Bishop McDevitt	34–27	Hersheypark Stadium
2022	Bishop McDevitt	3	Aliquippa	41–18	Chapman Field, Cumberland Valley
2023	Aliquippa (5)	7	Dallas	60–14	Chapman Field, Cumberland Valley
2024	Bonner-Prendergast	12	Lampeter-Strasburg	40–14	Chapman Field, Cumberland Valley
2025	Southern Lehigh	11	Twin Valley	43–21	Chapman Field, Cumberland Valley

== Class 5A ==
Class 5A was formed in 2015 and its inaugural season was the 2016 football season.

Year	Champion	District	Runner-up	Score	Site
2016	Archbishop Wood (4)	12	Harrisburg	37–10	Hersheypark Stadium
2017	Archbishop Wood (5)	12	Gateway	49–14	Hersheypark Stadium
2018	Penn Hills	7	Manheim Central	36–31	Hersheypark Stadium
2019	Archbishop Wood (6)	12	Cheltenham	19–15	Hersheypark Stadium
2020	Pine-Richland (2)	7	Cathedral Prep	48–7	Hersheypark Stadium
2021	Penn-Trafford	7	Imhotep Charter	17–14 (OT)	Hersheypark Stadium
2022	Pine-Richland (3)	7	Imhotep Charter	28–14	Chapman Field, Cumberland Valley
2023	Imhotep Charter (2)	12	Peters Township	38–13	Chapman Field, Cumberland Valley
2024	Bishop McDevitt	3	Roman Catholic	34–31 (OT)	Chapman Field, Cumberland Valley
2025	Roman Catholic	12	Bishop McDevitt	28-6	Chapman Field, Cumberland Valley

== Class 6A ==
Class 6A was formed in 2015 and its inaugural season was the 2016 football season.

Year	Champion	District	Runner-up	Score	Site
2016	St. Joseph's Prep (3)	12	Central Catholic (Pittsburgh)	42–7	Hersheypark Stadium
2017	Pine-Richland	7	St. Joseph's Prep	41–21	Hersheypark Stadium
2018	St. Joseph's Prep (4)	12	Harrisburg	40–20	Hersheypark Stadium
2019	St. Joseph's Prep (5)	12	Central Dauphin	35–13	Hersheypark Stadium
2020	St. Joseph's Prep (6)	12	Central York	62–13	Hersheypark Stadium
2021	Mt. Lebanon	7	St. Joseph's Prep	35–17	Hersheypark Stadium
2022	St. Joseph's Prep (7)	12	Harrisburg	42–7	Chapman Field, Cumberland Valley
2023	St. Joseph's Prep (8)	12	North Allegheny (2)	45–23	Chapman Field, Cumberland Valley
2024	St. Joseph's Prep (9)	12	Central Catholic (Pittsburgh)	35–6	Chapman Field, Cumberland Valley
2025	La Salle College (2)	12	Central Catholic (Pittsburgh)	34-20	Chapman Field, Cumberland Valley
