= 2016 PIAA football season =

- Sport: Pennsylvania High school football
- Duration: August 26 – October 28 (regular season); November 4 – December 10 (playoffs and championships)
- Teams: 570 schools

State Championships
- Venue: Hersheypark Stadium, Hershey, Pennsylvania
- Champions: 1A) Bishop Guilfoyle (3rd); 2A) Steel Valley (1st); 3A) Beaver Falls (1st); 4A) Cathedral Prep (3rd); 5A) Archbishop Wood (4th); 6A) Saint Joseph's Prep (3rd)

Seasons
- 2015 2017 →

The 2016 PIAA football season was the 103rd season of PIAA football in Pennsylvania. 570 high schools competed in the commonwealth playing twelve regular season games and up to four playoff games the state championship game.

== Season standings ==
=== Class A ===
State Champions	Championship game participant	Playoff participant

School	Overall	Conf
Bishop Guilfoyle	15–0	10–0
Clairton	14–1	10–0
Dunmore	13–1	9–0
Lakeland	10–2	8–1
Lackawanna Trail	9–4	6–3
Jenkintown	8–3	4–2
Riverside	7–4	7–2
Mid Valley	5–6	5–4
Old Forge	4–6	4–5
Susquehanna Community	4–6	3–6
Carbondale	3–7	2–7
Montrose	1–9	1–8
Holy Cross	0–10	0–9

== State playoff progression ==
=== A ===
State first round Nov. 18–19
Lackawanna Trail	12
Williams Valley	22
Steelton-Highspire	38
Muncy	3
Bishop Guilfoyle	55
Northern Cambria	6
Portage	22
Homer-Center	41
Conemaugh	0
Farrell	30
Elk County Catholic	13
Ridgway/Johnsonburg	42
Clairton	38
Northgate	14
Rochester	20
Jeannette City	30

State quarterfinals Nov. 25–26
Williams Valley	20
Steelton-Highspire	24
Bishop Guilfoyle	52
Homer-Center	6
Farrell	20
Ridgway/Johnsonburg	7
Clairton	26
Jeannette City	6

State semifinals Dec. 2–3
Steelton-Highspire	6
Bishop Guilfoyle	48
Farrell	6
Clairton	24

State Championship; Dec. 9
Bishop Guilfoyle	17
Clairton	0

=== AA ===
State first round Nov. 18–19
Ligonier Valley	35
Bishop McCort	7
Dunmore	48
York Catholic	35
Southern Columbia	49
South Williamsport	21
Schuylkill Haven	41
West Catholic	12
Steel Valley	42
Riverside	0
Washington	7
Neshannock	27
Wilmington Area	56
Sharpsville Area	7
Kane	34
Chestnut Ridge	12

State quarter-finals Nov. 25–26
Ligonier Valley	39
Dunmore	19
Southern Columbia	20
Schuylkill Haven	5
Steel Valley	49
Neshannock	14
Wilmington Area	42
Kane	0

State semi-finals Dec. 2–3
Ligonier Valley	27
Southern Columbia	31
Steel Valley	49
Wilmington Area	13

State championship Dec. 10
Southern Columbia	7
Steel Valley	49

=== AAA ===
State first round Nov. 18–19
Middletown	48
Wyomissing	20
Scranton Prep	37
Montoursville	13
Notre Dame	28
Pen Argyl	7
Conwell–Egan Catholic	14
Delaware Valley Charter	26
Hickory	17
Karns City	35
Central	49
Juniata	0
Beaver Falls	35
Aliquippa	22
No team
No team

State quarterfinals Nov. 25–26
Middletown	40
Scranton Prep	13
Notre Dame	36
Delaware Valley Charter	21
Karns City	21
Central	36
Beaver Falls
bye

State semifinals Dec. 2–3
Middletown	49
Notre Dame	14
Central	7
Beaver Falls	14

State Championship; Dec. 9
Middletown	13
Beaver Falls	30

== Awards ==
=== Mr. Pennsylvania Football ===
Finalists Big School Class 4A-6A:

  - **Bold** indicates winner
- **D'Andre Swift** (RB) — St. Joseph’s Prep
- Zane Dudek (RB) — Armstrong HS
- Mark Webb (WR/CB) — Archbishop Wood HS
- Micah Parsons (RB/DE) — Harrisburg HS
- David Adams (LB) — Central Catholic

See full list of nominees for 4A-6A Mr PA Football Award Here

Finalists Small School Class 1A-3A:

  - **Bold** indicates winner
- Collin Smith (QB/DB) — Ligonier Valley HS
- Jaelen Thompson (RB) — Middletown HS
- **Lamount Wade** (RB/CB) — Clairton HS
- Paris Ford (WR/DB) — Steel Valley HS
- Andrew Irwin (LB/RB — Bishop Guilfoyle

See full list of nominees for 1A-3A Mr PA Football Award Here

=== Mr PA Football lineman award ===
Big School 4A-6A winner

- Joshua Lugg (RG/RT) — North Allegheny HS

Small School 1A-3A winner

- Donovan Jeter (DL — Beaver Falls HS

== All-State selections ==
=== CLASS 5A ===
- Player of the Year: Zane Dudek, Armstrong
- Coach of the Year: Calvin Everett, Harrisburg

==== Offense ====
Quarterback

- Kameron Patterson, Grove City – 6–3, 190 senior
- Kody Kegarise, Manheim Central – 6–0, 185 senior
- Grant Breneman, Cedar Cliff – 6–1, 190 senior
- Yahmir Wilkerson, Harrisburg – 6–1, 200 junior
- Nick Ross, West Allegheny – 6–1, 190 senior

Running back

- Zane Dudek, Armstrong – 5–10, 190 senior
- Journey Brown, Meadville – 5–11, 195 senior
- Shawn Thompson, Archbishop Wood – 6–0, 195 senior
- Matt Garcia, Phoenixville – 5–6, 165 senior

Wide receiver

- Dez Boykin, Whitehall – 5–11, 175 junior
- Jake Novak, Manheim Central – 5–11, 170 junior
- Mark Webb, Archbishop Wood – 6–3, 205 senior

Tight end

- A.J. Turner, Grove City – 6–2, 200 senior
- Gabe Schappell, Exeter Twp. – 6–2, 220 senior

Offensive linemen

- Kieran Firment, West Allegheny – 6–4, 280 senior
- Chris Bleich, Wyoming Valley West – 6–6, 300 junior
- Curtis Harper, McKeesport – 6–3, 293 senior
- Adam Kline, Manheim Central – 6–1, 230 senior
- Shaun Hastings, Cedar Cliff – 6–2, 265 senior

Athlete

- Raheem Blackshear, Archbishop Wood – 5–11, 180 senior
- Isaiah Manning, Meadville – 6–0, 190 junior

Specialist

- D.J. Opsatnik, West Allegheny – 5–8, 150 senior

==== Defense ====
Defensive linemen

- Matt Holmes, West Allegheny – 6–1, 225 senior
- Micah Parsons, Harrisburg – 6–3, 230 junior
- Damion Barber, Harrisburg – 6–3, 240 senior
- Gunnar Royer, Manheim Central – 6–1, 210
- Anthony Diodato, Archbishop Wood – 6–5, 255 senior

Linebacker

- Matt Palmer, Archbishop Wood – 6–1, 205 junior
- Nick Brown, Manheim Central – 5–10, 195 senior
- Forrest Rhyne, Waynesboro – 6–2, 225 senior
- Francis Duggan, Cedar Cliff – 6–3, 220 junior

Defensive back

- Keyshaan Husband, Central Tech – 6–0, 185 senior
- Cade Robinson, Elizabethtown – 6–1, 175 junior
- Ethan Laird, General McLane – 6–2, 200 senior
- Jackson Buskirk, Whitehall – 6–1, 180 senior

Athlete

- Joel Davis, Harrisburg – 5–9, 180 senior
- Teddy Wright, Academy Park – 6–0, 200 senior

=== CLASS 3A ===
- Player of the Year: Alex Hoenstine, Central Martinsburg
- Coach of the Year: Ryan Matsook, Beaver Falls

==== Offense ====
Quarterback

- Brycen Mussina, Montoursville – 6–4, 185 senior
- Alex Smith, Keystone Oaks – 6–4, 195 senior
- Darius Wise, Beaver Area – 5–11, 170 senior

Running back

- Alex Hoenstine, Central Martinsburg – 6–2, 181 senior
- Chuck Carr, Hickory – 5–10, 195 senior
- Jalean Thompson, Middletown – 5–10, 190 senior
- Tyler Balega, Derry – 5–11, 178 senior
- Ian Border, Huntingdon – 6–0, 210 junior

Wide receiver

- Tommy Shea, Montoursville – 5–10, 175 senior
- Ziyon Strickland, Sharon – 5–11, 175 junior
- Duane Brown, Apollo-Ridge – 6–0, 182 senior

Tight end

- Mitchell Rothrock, Montoursville – 6–1, 190 senior

Offensive linemen

- Crae McCracken, Loyalsock Twp. – 6–4, 275 senior
- Trevor Miller, Central Martinsburg – 6–1, 245 senior
- Ethan Newton, Middletown – 6–2, 250 senior
- Tyler Bishop, Hickory – 6–2, 280 senior
- Kyle Polishan, Scranton Prep – 6–3, 245 senior

Athlete

- Marcus Williams, Loyalsock Twp. – 5–9, 185 senior
- Will Gruber, Hickory – 5–10, 165 junior

Specialist

- Ethan Lazorka, Montoursville – 5–9, 150 senior

==== Defense ====
Defensive linemen

- Donovan Jeter, Beaver Falls – 6–5, 250 senior
- Austin Heisler, Pen Argyl – 6–0, 205 senior
- Peyton Snopek, Lancaster Catholic – 6–2, 230 junior
- Max Borgia, Scranton Prep – 5–9, 225 senior
- Justin Casey, Nanticoke Area – 6–6, 207 senior
- Josh Parson, Juniata – 6–3, 260 senior

Linebacker

- Hunter Webb, Loyalsock Twp. – 6–2, 200 junior
- Major Jordan, North Schuylkill – 6–1, 215 senior
- Hunter Landis, Middletown – 6–1, 210 senior
- Trey Delbaugh, Lewisburg – 5–11, 185 senior
- Jared Smith, Central Martinsburg – 6–0, 198 junior
- Jesse Luketa, Mercyhurst Prep – 6–3, 218 junior

Defensive back

- De'Shaun Wilson, Wyomissing – 5–10, 160 junior
- Jeff Wehler, St. Mary's – 6–1, 195 senior
- Bryan Downey, Lancaster Catholic – 6–0, 185 senior

Athlete

- Tyreer Mills, Middletown – 5–9, 165 junior
- Jalen Simpson, Notre Dame-Green Pond – 5–11, 170 senior

=== CLASS 2A ===
- Player of the Year: Elijah Parrish, Ligonier Valley
- Coach of the Year: Rod Steele, Steel Valley

==== Offense ====
Quarterback

- Collin Smith, Ligonier Valley 6–1, 200 senior
- Frank Antuono, Neshannock 6–2, 220 senior

Running back

- Tyler Barone, Iroquois 5–10, 190 senior
- Gaige Garcia, Southern Columbia 5–9, 180 freshmen
- A.J. Crider, South Side Beaver 6–2, 215 senior

Wide receiver

=== CLASS 1A ===
- Player of the Year: Lamont Wade, Clairton
- Coach of the Year: Justin Wheeler, Bishop Guilfoyle

==== Offense ====
Quarterback

- Josh Trybus, Bishop Guilfoyle – 5–10, 172 senior
- Noah Hamlin, Clairton – 5–11, 160 senior
- Brenden Makray, Clarion-Limestone – 6–4, 162 junior

Running back

- Braxton Chapman, Farrell – 6–1, 210 senior
- Lamont Wade, Clairton – 5–9, 190 senior
- Dylan Rabuck, Williams Valley – 6–0, 189 junior
- Braedon St. Clair, Portage – 6–0, 190 senior
- Nick Stewart, Curwensville – 6–1, 205 junior
- Tylor Belles, Sayre – 6–0, 210 senior

Wide receiver

- Garrett Geresti, Avella – 6–2, 175 senior
- Sam Leadbetter, Clarion-Limestone – 6–3, 162 senior
- Markus Jenkins, Our Lady of Sacred Heart – 6–1, 181 senior

Offensive linemen

- Nick Leamer, Bishop Guilfoyle – 6–2, 300 junior
- Eric Washington, Steelton-Highspire – 6–5, 311 senior
- Steven McClure, Curwensville – 6–3, 220 junior
- Wandell Murray, Farrell – 6–3, 315 senior
- Ian Minnich, Williams Valley – 5–10, 276 senior

Athlete

- Jake Murawski, Moshannon Valley – 6–1, 175 senior
- Mike Macefe, Clarion-Limestone – 5–8, 182 senior

Specialist

- Kolton McGhee, Bishop Guilfoyle – 6–0, 170 sophomore

==== Defense ====
Defensive linemen

- Luke Frederick, Bishop Guilfoyle – 6–5, 225 senior
- Justin Kasmierski, Ridgway – 6–3, 235 senior
- Devon Rabuck, Williams Valley – 6–0, 198 junior
- Hunter Poust, Muncy – 6–1, 225 junior
- Logan McGeary, Bishop Guilfoyle – 6–2, 290 senior
- Kyle Plesh, Marian Catholic – 6–0, 249 senior

Linebacker

- Andrew Irwin, Bishop Guilfoyle – 6–1, 216 senior
- Dylan Wolfgang, Williams Valley – 6–1, 165 junior
- Kyi Wright, Farrell – 6–3, 225 sophomore
- Kaden Martell, Canton – 6–0, 215 junior
- Pap Keeler, Farrell – 6–2, 230 senior

Defensive back

- Kenny Robinson, Imani Christian – 6–2, 200 senior
- Neil MacDonald, Ridgway – 6–0, 172 junior
- Brock Barrett, Redbank Valley – 6–0, 175 junior
- Josh Porterfield, West Middlesex – 5–10, 155 senior
