= Hank Day =

American football and baseball player and coach (1875–1910)

Biographical details
- Born: December 29, 1892; Morris Township, Washington County, Pennsylvania, U.S.
- Died: April 18, 1955 (aged 62); Washington, Pennsylvania, U.S.

Playing career
- 1914: Washington & Jefferson

Coaching career (HC unless noted)
- 1916–1931: Washington HS (PA)
- 1932–1936: Washington & Jefferson
- 1937–1946: Farrell HS (PA)
- 1947–1949: Washington HS (PA)

Head coaching record
- Overall: 20–22–2 (college); 153–66–16 (high school)

Leroy P. "Hank" Day (December 29, 1892 – April 18, 1955) was an American football coach. He served as the head football coach at Washington & Jefferson College in Washington, Pennsylvania from 1932 to 1936, compiling a record of 20–22–2. Day attended Washington & Jefferson and played college football in 1914 for head coach Bob Folwell. After graduating in 1915, he was the head football coach at Washington High School from 1916 to 1931. Day left Washington & Jefferson in 1937 and spent ten years as the head football coach at Farrell High School in Farrell, Pennsylvania. He returned to Washington High School as head football coach in 1947. After three more seasons at Washington High School, Day's contact was not renewed in the spring of 1950. He tallied records of 101–15–9 during his first stint at Washington High School, 49–28–7 at Farrell, and 3–23 in his final run at Washington. He was later a grade school principal.

Day was born on December 29, 1892, in Morris Township, Washington County, Pennsylvania, to S. Linn and Clara Patterson Day. He died on April 18, 1955, at Washington Hospital in Washington, Pennsylvania.

== Head coaching record ==
=== College ===
Year	Team	Overall	Conference	Standing	Bowl/playoffs
Washington & Jefferson Presidents (Independent) (1932–1936)
1932	Washington & Jefferson	5–3–1			
1933	Washington & Jefferson	2–7–1			
1934	Washington & Jefferson	4–5			
1935	Washington & Jefferson	4–4			
1936	Washington & Jefferson	5–3			
Washington & Jefferson:		20–22–2			
Total:		20–22–2			
