= Tierney Pfirman =

American basketball player

No. 22 – ACS Sepsi SIC
- Position: Small forward / power forward
- League: Liga Națională

Personal information
- Born: February 4, 1994 (age 32) Williamsport, Pennsylvania
- Listed height: 6 ft 2 in (1.88 m)
- Listed weight: 170 lb (77 kg)

Career information
- High school: South Williamsport (South Williamsport, Pennsylvania)
- College: Maryland (2012–2016)
- WNBA draft: 2016: undrafted
- Playing career: 2016–present

Career history
- 2016–present: ACS Sepsi SIC

Tierney Pfirman is an American professional basketball player for ACS Sepsi SIC of Liga Națională the top flight of women's basketball in Romania. She played college basketball for Maryland.

== Early years ==
Pfirman attended South Williamsport Area Junior/Senior High School located in South Williamsport, Pennsylvania.

=== High school awards ===
- 2× AP All-State First team (as junior & senior)
- AP All-State Second team (as sophomore)
- AP All-State Third team (as freshman)
- 4× Associated Press All-State honoree
- 4× First Team All-Conference in Heartland III
- 2× Williamsport Sun-Gazette Female Athlete of the Year (as junior & senior)
- 2× Williamsport Sun-Gazette Player of the Year (as junior and senior)
- 3× ESPN Radio Williamsport 104.1FM/1050AM Basketball Player of the Year (as sophomore, junior & senior)

== College career ==
=== Freshman year 2012–13 ===
Saw action in 21 games and started in 12, recorded 9 points in first ever game at Maryland in an 88–47 win over Mount Saint Mary's. Scored in double digits for the first time next game vs Loyola Maryland the Terps won 88–45. Was named ACC Rookie of the week on December 10, after 11, 17 and 19 points in three games that week all wins. She dislocated her knee cap after colliding with a practice player and missed 4–6 weeks which ruled her out for remainder of the season.

=== Maryland statistics ===
Legend
GP	Games played	GS	Games started	MPG	Minutes per game
FG%	Field goal percentage	3P%	3-point field goal percentage	FT%	Free throw percentage
RPG	Rebounds per game	APG	Assists per game	SPG	Steals per game
BPG	Blocks per game	PPG	Points per game	**Bold**	Career high

Year	Team	GP	Points	FG%	3P%	FT%	RPG	APG	SPG	BPG	PPG
2012–13	Maryland	21	154	36.6%	23.5%	66.7%	3.8	**2.2**	**1.0**	0.3	7.3
2013–14	Maryland	34	174	47.2%	0.0%	62.5%	3.7	0.9	0.5	**0.4**	5.1
2014–15	Maryland	**35**	170	**51.6%**	33.3%	61.1%	3.9	0.7	0.5	0.2	4.9
2015–16	Maryland	29	**265**	48.8%	**43.5%**	**78.6%**	**4.9**	1.0	0.9	0.1	**9.1**
Career		119	763	46.2%	31.7%	65.9%	4.1	1.1	0.7	0.3	6.4

== Professional career ==
On July 19, 2016 Pfirman signed with Sepsi-SIC of the Romanian women's basketball league the top flight of women's basketball in Romania.
