= Randolph Crowder =

Randolph Crowder may refer to:

- Randolph Channing Crowder Jr. or Channing Crowder (born 1983), American football linebacker
- Randolph Channing Crowder Sr. or Randy Crowder (1952–2025), American football defensive lineman
