= Duquesne, Pennsylvania =

City in Pennsylvania, US

- City
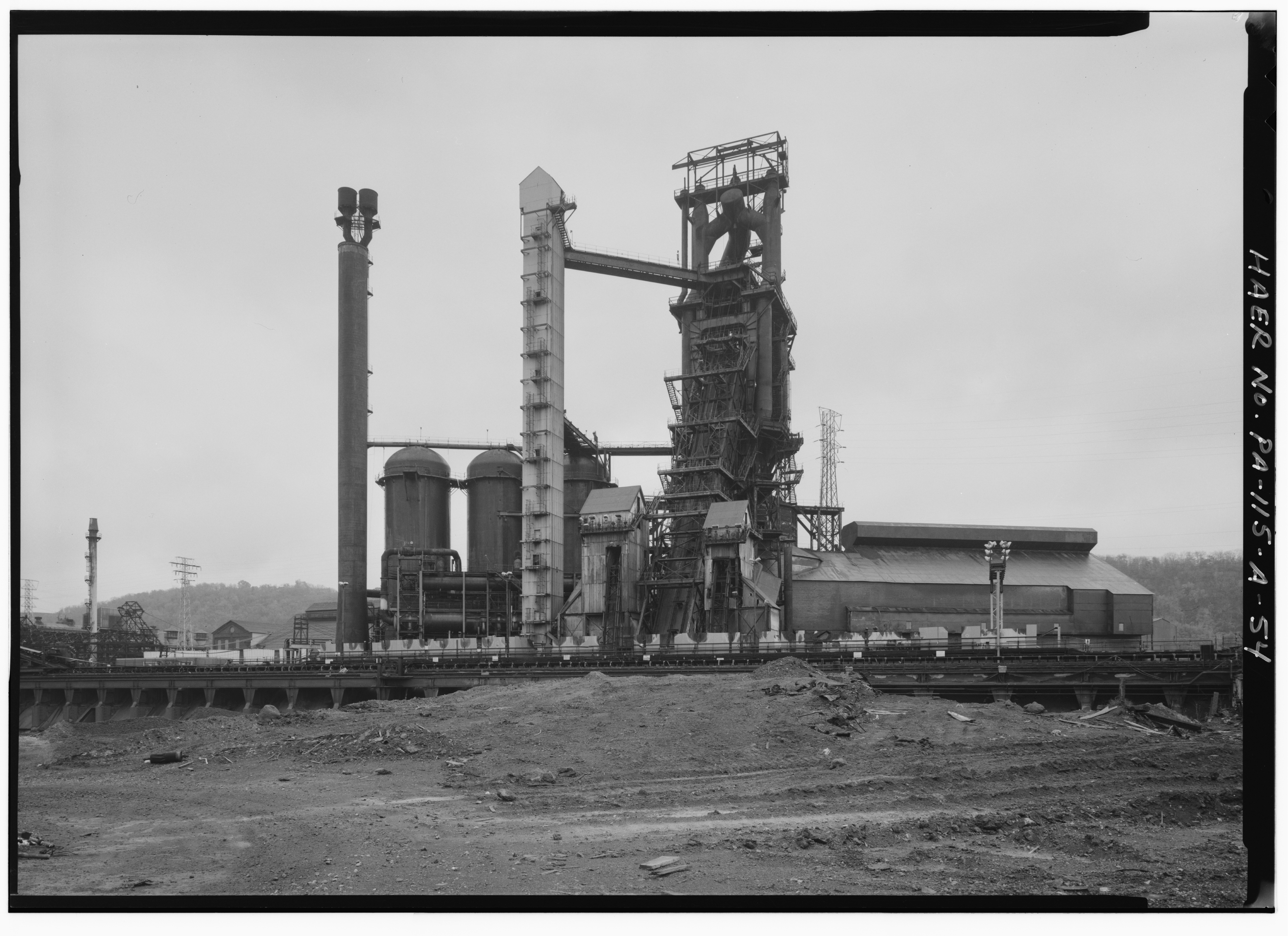
- Former "Dorothy Six" blast furnace

- Logo
- Interactive map of Duquesne, Pennsylvania
- Location within Pennsylvania Location within the United States
- Coordinates: 40°22′12″N 79°51′3″W
- Country: United States
- State: Pennsylvania
- County: Allegheny
- Settled: 1885
- Incorporated: September 12, 1891 (borough)
- January 7, 1918 (city)

Area
  - Total: 2.01 sq mi (5.21 km^{2})
  - Land: 1.81 sq mi (4.70 km^{2})
  - Water: 0.20 sq mi (0.51 km^{2})

Population (2020)
  - Total: 5,254
  - Density: 2,893.0/sq mi (1,116.98/km^{2})
- Time zone: UTC-5 (EST)
  - Summer (DST): UTC-4 (EDT)
- ZIP code: 15110
- Area code: 412
- FIPS code: 42-20432
- Website: duquesnepa.us

Duquesne (/djuːˈkeɪn/ dew-KAYN) is a city along the Monongahela River in Allegheny County, Pennsylvania, United States, within the Pittsburgh metropolitan area. The population was 5,254 at the 2020 census.

== History ==
The city of Duquesne was settled in 1789 and incorporated in 1891. The city derives its name from Fort Duquesne.

Duquesne Works, a productive steel mill that was part of Carnegie Steel Corporation and later part of U.S. Steel, was the heart and soul of Duquesne during its brightest moments in the early 20th century. Duquesne was home to the largest blast furnace in the world, named the "Dorothy Six". Bob Dylan's song "Duquesne Whistle" (Tempest, 2012) is dedicated to it.

The city's population peaked in 1930, then declined with the Great Depression and deindustrialization beginning after World War II. Today a stark post-industrial landscape, Duquesne has fewer total residents (5,565 at the 2010 U.S. census) than were the city's mill workers in 1948. According to the McKeesport Daily News, Duquesne has the worst performing schools in the commonwealth of Pennsylvania. Duquesne was designated a financially distressed municipality in 1991, but has since left that status as of October of 2023.

== Geography ==
Duquesne is located along the Monongahela River, approximately 12 miles (19 km) south of Pittsburgh.

According to the United States Census Bureau, the city has a total area of 2.0 square miles (5.2 km^{2}), of which 1.8 square miles (4.7 km^{2}) is land and 0.2 square miles (0.52 km^{2}), or 10.84%, is water.

== Demographics ==
Historical population
Census	Pop.	Note	%±
1860	870		—
1870	1,720		97.7%
1900	9,036		—
1910	15,727		74.0%
1920	19,011		20.9%
1930	21,396		12.5%
1940	20,693		−3.3%
1950	17,620		−14.9%
1960	15,019		−14.8%
1970	11,410		−24.0%
1980	10,094		−11.5%
1990	8,525		−15.5%
2000	7,332		−14.0%
2010	5,565		−24.1%
2020	5,254		−5.6%

=== 2020 census ===
As of the 2020 census, Duquesne had a population of 5,254, and the median age was 36.9 years. 26.2% of residents were under the age of 18 and 15.8% of residents were 65 years of age or older. For every 100 females there were 85.4 males, and for every 100 females age 18 and over there were 79.9 males age 18 and over.

100.0% of residents lived in urban areas, while 0.0% lived in rural areas.

There were 2,391 households in Duquesne, of which 27.3% had children under the age of 18 living in them. Of all households, 16.9% were married-couple households, 26.4% were households with a male householder and no spouse or partner present, and 48.1% were households with a female householder and no spouse or partner present. About 43.3% of all households were made up of individuals and 15.9% had someone living alone who was 65 years of age or older.

There were 2,845 housing units, of which 16.0% were vacant. The homeowner vacancy rate was 2.2% and the rental vacancy rate was 9.0%.

Racial composition as of the 2020 census
Race	Number	Percent
White	1,761	33.5%
Black or African American	2,973	56.6%
American Indian and Alaska Native	15	0.3%
Asian	8	0.2%
Native Hawaiian and Other Pacific Islander	1	0.0%
Some other race	121	2.3%
Two or more races	375	7.1%
Hispanic or Latino (of any race)	177	3.4%

=== 2000 census ===
As of the 2000 census, there were 7,332 people, 3,179 households, and 1,853 families residing in the city. The population density was 4,035.0 inhabitants per square mile (1,557.9/km^{2}). There were 3,768 housing units at an average density of 2,073.7 per square mile (800.7/km^{2}). The racial makeup of the city was 38.92% White, 57.75% African American, 0.15% Native American, 0.14% Asian, 0.01% Pacific Islander, 0.74% from other races, and 2.29% from two or more races. Hispanic or Latino of any race were 0.72% of the population.

There were 3,179 households, out of which 28.1% had children under the age of 18 living with them, 25.8% were married couples living together, 27.2% had a female householder with no husband present, and 41.7% were non-families. 37.2% of all households were made up of individuals, and 18.6% had someone living alone who was 65 years of age or older. The average household size was 2.28 and the average family size was 3.00.

In the city the population was spread out, with 28.3% under the age of 18, 9.6% from 18 to 24, 24.3% from 25 to 44, 18.6% from 45 to 64, and 19.2% who were 65 years of age or older. The median age was 36 years. For every 100 females, there were 80.3 males. For every 100 females age 18 and over, there were 75.1 males.

The median income for a household in the city was $19,766, and the median income for a family was $25,898. Males had a median income of $25,046 versus $22,272 for females. The per capita income for the city was $12,067. About 31.3% of families and 34.7% of the population were below the poverty line, including 52.9% of those under age 18 and 19.7% of those age 65 or over.

== Government ==
PREVIOUS Mayor was Krivacheck. Nickole Nesby, Duquesne's first Black female mayor, took office in January 2018-2021. Republican mayor R. Scott Adam's Elected in 2022 and reelected for 2nd term in 2025

== Education ==
Duquesne City School District operates a public elementary school.

Duquesne High School closed in 2007. Beginning with the 2007–08 school year, Duquesne students have reported to West Mifflin Area High School, or East Allegheny High School. Since July 2007, the Allegheny Intermediate Unit (AIU) has managed all academic and business operations of the Duquesne's K–8 school district. As of 2023 the school district now has grades 6–8 as well. End of 2026 school will be closing and district merging with one of surrounding school districts.

== Notable people ==
- Michael James Brody, US Naval Academy, US Marines, Harvard University, father of Michael James Brody Jr, sensation in 1970 for giving money away in New York City, as highlighted in 2021 documentary, "Dear Mr Brody"
- Gene Gedman, running back for two-time NFL champion Detroit Lions
- Martha Farkas Glaser, civil rights activist and manager of jazz musician Erroll Garner
- Daniel Ford, musician
- Earl Hines, jazz pianist
- Ed Karpowich, NFL player
- George Little, NFL player
- Dave Maurer, head football coach at Wittenberg University and College Football Hall of Fame inductee
- Frederick J. Osterling, architect
- Dave Pilipovich, basketball head coach and Air Force Academy
- Lafayette Pitts, cornerback for the Atlanta Falcons
- Alex Shigo, horticulturist
- Johnny Stevens, MLB umpire
- Donald Soffer, businessman, investor and philanthropist
