= Ray Erney =

American football and baseball coach

Playing career

Football
- 1958: Juniata
- Position: Center

Coaching career (HC unless noted)

Football
- 1965–1970: Palmyra HS (PA)
- 1971: Steelton-Highspire HS (PA)
- 1972–1976: Mechanicsburg HS (PA)
- 1977–1979: Dickinson (assistant)
- 1980–1983: Dickinson
- 1984–?: Carlisle HS (PA)

Baseball
- 1981: Dickinson

Head coaching record
- Overall: 5–30–1 (college football); 8–14 (college baseball)

Raymond T. Erney Jr. is an American former football and baseball coach. He was the 31st head football coach at Dickinson College in Carlisle, Pennsylvania, serving for four seasons, from 1980 to 1983, and compiling a record of 5–30–1.

== Head coaching record ==
=== College ===
Year	Team	Overall	Conference	Standing	Bowl/playoffs
Dickinson Red Devils (Middle Atlantic Conference) (1980–1983)
1980	Dickinson	2–6–1	2–5–1	9th (Southern)	
1981	Dickinson	0–9	0–8	11th (Southern)	
1982	Dickinson	1–8	1–7	11th (Southern)	
Dickinson Red Devils (Centennial Conference) (1983)
1983	Dickinson	2–7	1–6	8th	
Dickinson:		5–30–1	4–26–1		
Total:		5–30–1			
