= Allegheny Intermediate Unit =

School district in Pennsylvania

Coordinates: 40.413513°N 79.908694°W

Location
- 475 East Waterfront Drive; Homestead, Allegheny County, Pennsylvania 15120

Information
- Type: Intermediate Unit
- Established: 1971
- Employees: 1,200
- Information: Located at more than 300 sites throughout Allegheny County
- Website: http://www.aiu3.net 412-394-5700

The Allegheny Intermediate Unit (AIU) is a branch of the Pennsylvania Department of Education, and is the largest of the 29 intermediate units in Pennsylvania. It was created by the state’s General Assembly in 1971, and is headquartered in Homestead.

The AIU provides specialized education services to 42 suburban public school districts and five career and technical centers in Allegheny County. The agency, which has about 1,200 employees at nearly 300 sites throughout the county, also operates 10 family centers and three schools for exceptional children. Funded by federal, state, county and private grants, the AIU coordinates more than 130 programs designed to help infants, young children, students and adults. In 2024, the programs offered by the AIU served more than 113,000 students in public schools.

== Leadership and governance ==
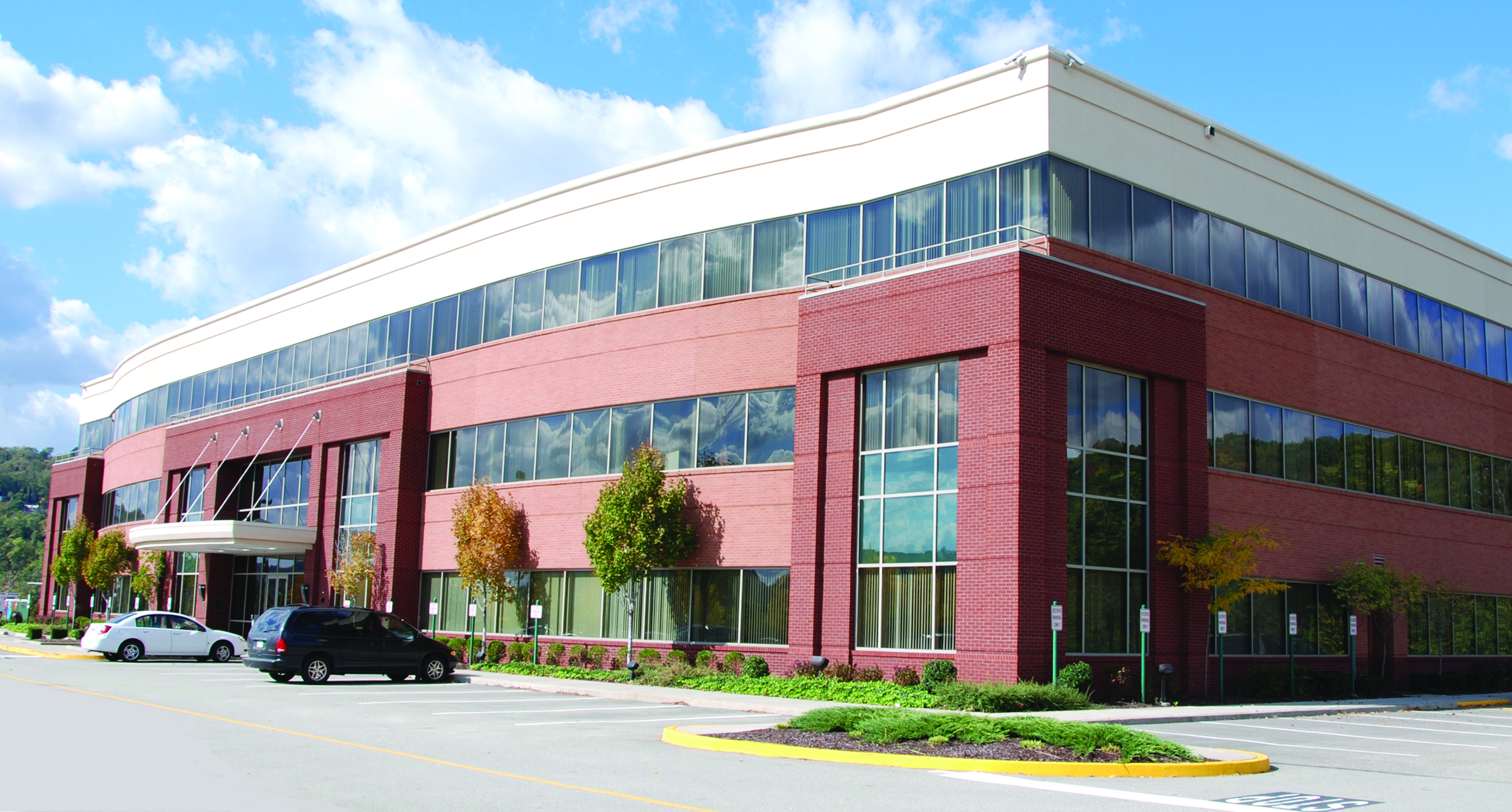
AIU Headquarters, Homestead, PA

The AIU's board of directors has 13 members, elected from Allegheny County's 42 suburban public school districts. Dr. Robert Scherrer is the agency's executive director.

== Public school districts served ==
- Allegheny Valley School District
- Avonworth School District
- Baldwin-Whitehall School District
- Bethel Park School District
- Brentwood Borough School District
- Carlynton School District
- Chartiers Valley School District
- Clairton City School District
- Cornell School District
- Deer Lakes School District
- Duquesne City School District
- East Allegheny School District
- Elizabeth Forward School District
- Fox Chapel Area School District
- Gateway School District
- Hampton Township School District
- Highlands School District
- Keystone Oaks School District
- McKeesport Area School District
- Montour School District
- Moon Area School District
- Mt. Lebanon School District
- North Allegheny School District
- North Hills School District
- Northgate School District
- Penn Hills School District
- Pine-Richland School District
- Plum Borough School District
- Quaker Valley School District
- Riverview School District
- Shaler Area School District
- South Allegheny School District
- South Fayette Township School District
- South Park School District
- Steel Valley School District
- Sto-Rox School District
- Upper St. Clair School District
- West Allegheny School District
- West Jefferson Hills School District
- West Mifflin Area School District
- Wilkinsburg School District
- Woodland Hills School District

== Career and technology centers served ==
- A.W. Beattie Career Center
- Forbes Road Career & Technology Center
- McKeesport Career & Technology Center
- Parkway West Career & Technology Center
- Steel Center Career Technical School

== The role of intermediate units ==
Pennsylvania’s intermediate units were created in 1971 in an effort to help school districts operate more efficiently and meet the specialized needs of their students. Since then, these education agencies have evolved into an important resource on which school districts rely.

School districts and intermediate units are separate legal entities. Intermediate units have no legal jurisdiction over school districts and do not control school districts. On the contrary, intermediate units exist to serve school districts and provide leadership which will improve local operations. Although intermediate units are an extension of the Pennsylvania Department of Education, they differ greatly from local school districts in several ways.

School Districts	Intermediate Units
Gain revenue from local real estate taxes	Have no taxing powers
Can own property for a variety of uses	Can own property for office use only
Have one yearly budget which is adopted based on approval of its local board	Have several budgets, all of which must be passed by its local board. IUs receive funding for individual programs and these funds cannot be co-mingled. In addition, IUs develop a yearly Program of Services Budget which requires approval from a majority of its member school districts
Serve students in a predetermined geographic area	Serve a very diverse population of students who often reside beyond IU boundaries
