= Yogi Roth =

American football player, coach and analyst

Biographical details
- Born: September 20, 1981 (age 45)

Playing career
- 2000–2003: Pittsburgh
- Position: Wide receiver

Coaching career (HC unless noted)
- 2005–2009: USC (QB coach)

Yogi Zohar Roth (born September 20, 1981) is an American college football analyst, coach, and former player, and an author and filmmaker. He coaches Elite 11 quarterbacks, is a producer and host on the Pac-12 Network, and hosts "The It Factory" podcast. He is the co-author of the book 5-Star QB. Roth has produced multiple documentary films including The Cape, about setting sail around Cape Horn to retrace the journey of his great-great-great-grandfather, and Life in a Walk, about trekking through Camino de Santiago with his father.

== Early life and education ==
Roth is a native of Lackawanna County, Pennsylvania, and has two sibilings. His parents, Will and Devorah, hosted foreign exchange students every summer from Germany, Kenya, Israel, and other countries.

Roth attended Lackawanna Trail Junior-Senior High School in Factoryville, Pennsylvania, where he played four sports. An all-state defensive back, he contributed to two successive Lackawanna Football Conference Division IV championship teams.

He later earned a master's degree in communication management from the Annenberg School for Communication and Journalism.

== Career ==
Roth began his collegiate career as an athlete at the University of Pittsburgh where he walked onto the football team, earning a full athletic scholarship as a wide receiver. His college roommate was Larry Fitzgerald.

He then began a coaching career on the staff of Pete Carroll at USC. He rose through the coaching ranks, eventually becoming USC's assistant quarterbacks coach. After four years on the USC coaching staff he transitioned to media, where he began a career as a college football analyst and host for ESPN, Fox, and the Pac-12 Network.

After pitching and producing his first documentary for ESPN, 3 for the show, which chronicled Jake Locker, Cam Newton and Tyrod Taylor's final season on the college gridiron and subsequent transition into the NFL, Roth became interested in storytelling.

He co-wrote the book, Win Forever (2010) with Pete Carroll, which reached no. 7 on the New York Times best-seller list, as well as his own book, From PA to LA (2010). In 2011, he was a producer on Depth Chart, an ESPN series that followed the Miami Hurricanes and their quarterbacks during training camp.

Roth also hosted and produced the Elite 11 documentary series for ESPN from 2009 to 2014 (which was nominated for an Emmy in 2013), and in 2015, directed Dear football: the 2015 Elite 11 story, which followed several high school quarterbacks on and off the field.

He is a producer and narrator on the Pac-12 Network's series The Drive, which follows a football program from the conference throughout a season.

Roth made his directorial debut with the documentary feature film, Life in a Walk, which received the Outstanding Achievement in Filmmaking Award at the Newport Beach Film Festival. Life in a Walk follows Roth and his father, Will, on their trek along the Camino de Santiago, a famous pilgrimage through Portugal and Spain.

Roth has been an on-air correspondent for Entertainment Tonight, is a regular on the speaking circuit for corporate, collegiate, and high school events. In 2013, he presented his first TEDx Talk, titled Love Wins. Roth has acted in film and on television, appearing on Comedy Central, multiple national commercials, and in various independent films.

== Personal life ==
Roth lived in Australia after graduating from the University of Pittsburgh.
