= Lackawanna Trail School District =

School district in Pennsylvania

Location
- Factoryville, Wyoming County Pennsylvania, Pennsylvania; United States

District information
- Type: Public
- Grades: K–12
- Superintendent: Mr. Matthew Rakauskas
- Budget: $22,477,252.80 (2018-19)
- NCES District ID: 4212990

Students and staff
- Students: 966 (2020-2021)
- Student–teacher ratio: 12.52
- Colors: Red, White, Black

Other information
- Website: www.ltsd.org

The Lackawanna Trail School District is a public Pennsylvania school district. It serves Nicholson Boro, Nicholson Township, Clinton Township and Factoryville borough in Wyoming County and Dalton borough, La Plume Township, Benton Township and West Abington Township in Lackawanna County. The school district encompasses approximately 72.43 square miles and serves a resident population of 8,671. The district has one (K-6) elementary school located on College Avenue, Factoryville and one (7-12) high school on Tunnel Hill Road, Factoryville. As of the 2010 federal census, Lackawanna Trail School District has a total student population of 1,173. Elementary school (623 with a student/teacher ratio of 13.26), high school (550 with a student/teacher ratio of 11.70).
