= Oakland Catholic High School =

Private girls' school in Pittsburgh, Pennsylvania, US

Location
- 144 North Craig Street; Pittsburgh, (Allegheny County), Pennsylvania 15213; United States; 40°26′56″N 79°56′59″W

Information
- Type: Private, all female
- Religious affiliation: Roman Catholic
- Patron saint: St. Joan of Arc
- Established: 1989
- President: Kelly Lazzara
- Principal: Karen Kolenik
- Chaplain: Fr. Matt Hawkins
- Grades: 9-12
- Colors: Maroon and silver
- Athletics: 17 teams
- Mascot: Eagle
- Team name: Eagles
- Accreditation: Middle States Association of Colleges and Schools
- Publication: Forte (literary/art magazine)
- Newspaper: The Eagle Eye; Formerly the OC Record
- Tuition: $17,800 Domestic Student $21,000 International Student + $450 activity/technology fees (2021-22)
- Admissions Director: Lydia Damoose Langley
- Athletic Director: Korie Morton-Rozier
- Director of Advancement: Lynn Brown
- Director of Information Technology: Vernon Young
- Website: http://www.oaklandcatholic.org

Oakland Catholic High School is a private, Roman Catholic college preparatory school for girls, located in the Oakland neighborhood of Pittsburgh, Pennsylvania, United States, within the Diocese of Pittsburgh. It was established by Bishop Donald Wuerl in 1989 as the merger of former all-girl parish high schools of Sacred Heart and St. Paul Cathedral to serve as a sister school for Central Catholic. Approximately 600 students matriculate at Oakland Catholic and the school draws female students from all over Pittsburgh and its suburbs. Upon graduation, 100% of its students continue to a four-year university.

Oakland Catholic High School completed construction and renovations for the 2008-2009 school year.

== Athletics ==
Oakland Catholic offers 18 different sports stretching over three seasons (fall, winter and spring.)

Fall sports

- Cross country
- Field hockey
- Golf
- Soccer
- Tennis
- Volleyball

Winter sports

- Basketball
- Sideline Cheer
- Fencing
- Indoor track
- Swimming and diving

Spring sports

- Lacrosse
- Softball
- Track and field
- Ultimate

Highlights

- Basketball - Oakland Catholic is known for its girls basketball team. From 1998–2008 they were involved in every district championship (W.P.I.A.L.) game. They also won several Pennsylvania State Championship titles. The current women's head basketball coach is OC alumna, Brianne O'Rourke, OCHS'05 and former director of the woman's basketball operations at the University of Pittsburgh.
- Swimming - Oakland Catholic swimming also has a number of state championships. Oakland Catholic Swimming is widely known throughout the region for its multiple W.P.I.A.L. and state (P.I.A.A.) titles.
- Soccer - Oakland Catholic girls soccer won the WPIAL Class 3A Championship in 2018. The Eagles also advanced to the PIAA State semi-finals finishing with an overall record of 20-2, which is the best soccer season in OCHS history to date.

== Academic departments ==
- English
- Fine arts
- Foreign languages
- Health and physical education
- Math
- Religion
- Science
- Social studies

== Notable alumni ==
- Leah Smith
- Amanda Polk
- Gianna Martello, choreographer for the Abby Lee Dance Company from Dance Moms
