= Randy Crowder =

American football player (1952–2025)

No. 74, 71
- Positions: Defensive tackle, defensive end

Personal information
- Born: July 30, 1952; Sharon, Pennsylvania, U.S.
- Died: c. May 21, 2025 (aged 72)
- Listed height: 6 ft 2 in (1.88 m)
- Listed weight: 242 lb (110 kg)

Career information
- High school: Farrell Area (Farrell, Pennsylvania)
- College: Penn State
- NFL draft: 1974: 6th round, 136th overall pick

Career history
- Miami Dolphins (1974–1976); Tampa Bay Buccaneers (1978–1980)

Awards and highlights
- First-team All-American (1973); First-team All-East (1973)

Career NFL statistics
- Sacks: 19
- Fumble recoveries: 3
- Stats at Pro Football Reference

Randolph Channing Crowder Sr. (July 30, 1952 – May 20 2025) was an American professional football player who was a defensive lineman in the National Football League (NFL) for six seasons with the Miami Dolphins and Tampa Bay Buccaneers. He played college football for the Penn State Nittany Lions, earning first-team All-American honors in 1973. Crowder was selected by the Dolphins in the sixth round of the 1974 NFL draft.

== Early life and college ==
Crowder attended Farrell High School, starring in football, basketball, and track. He received All-American honors in football and all-state recognition in basketball. Farrell won the state championship Crowder's senior year and while many colleges wanted him to play basketball he opted to play college football for the Penn State Nittany Lions.

Crowder began college playing tight end, but then was converted to defense, where he thrived recording 173 tackles over his last two seasons. As a senior co-captain, playing alongside Heisman Trophy winner John Cappelletti, Crowder helped Penn State to a 12-0 record and a 16-9 victory overLSU in the Orange Bowl, earning first-team All-American honors. Crowder played in the 1974 Hula Bowl.

== Pro career ==
Crowder was selected by the Miami Dolphins in the sixth round of the 1974 NFL draft. Nine other of his Penn State teammates were selected.

As a rookie, Crowder played sporadically, but in 1975 he started 11 games and notched 7.5 sacks, while leading Miami linemen with 95 tackles (53 unassisted). Legendary Dolphins coach Don Shula said Crowder "might be the quickest tackle in the league." Crowder started all 14 games in 1976, his last in Miami.

Following a season out of the league due to legal issues, Crowder was signed as a free agent by the Tampa Bay Buccaneers in August 1978. He saw action in 14 games in 1978 while he played himself back into shape. The next season, Crowder moved into the starting lineup for the last eight games of the season as Tampa finished with a 10-6 record atop the NFC Central, granting the franchise its first playoff appearance. In the Divisional Playoff, Crowder recovered a Wilbert Montgomery fumble on the Philadelphia Eagles' four-yard line, setting up a crucial touchdown as Tampa prevailed 24-17. In the NFC Championship, Crowder and the Tampa defense held the Los Angeles Rams to nine points, but the Tampa offense failed to score, keeping the Buccaneers out of the Super Bowl.

Crowder began the 1980 season as a starter, but in the second game of the season, a rematch with the Rams, Crowder injured his knee. Crowder rehabilitated the injury for two seasons, but was injured his achilles during training camp in 1982, ending his NFL career.

== Arrest ==
On May 4, 1977, Crowder and his Dolphins teammate Don Reese, were arrested after trying to sell one pound (0.45 kg) of cocaine to an undercover policeman. On August 10, they both pleaded no contest and were each sentenced to a year in jail. Following their releases, each resumed their pro football careers.

== Coaching career ==
After retiring from the NFL, Crowder joined his college coach Joe Paterno's staff as the defensive line coach at Penn State University for two years before moving into private business in the Tampa area.

== Personal life and death ==
Randy had three children, one of whom is former Dolphins linebacker and sports radio host Channing Crowder. He later went by the nickname "Sugar Bear."

On May 21, 2025, the Dolphins announced Crowder's death at the age of 72.
