= Central Catholic High School (Pittsburgh) =

Secondary school in Pittsburgh, Pennsylvania

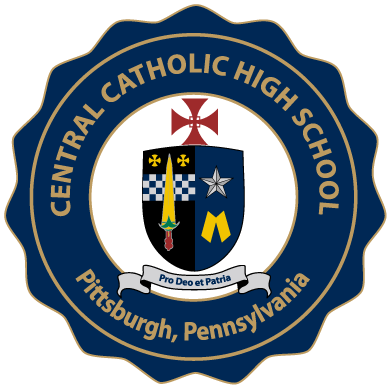

Location
- 4720 Fifth Ave; Pittsburgh, Allegheny, PA 15213; USA; 40.44667°N 79.94556°W

Information
- School type: Catholic high school
- Motto: Latin: Pro Deo et Patria (For God and Country)
- Religious affiliation: Catholic
- Denomination: Lasallian
- Patron saint: Jean-Baptiste de La Salle
- Established: 1927
- Founder: Hugh Charles Boyle
- Status: Currently operational
- Sister school: Oakland Catholic High School
- Oversight: Diocese of Pittsburgh
- CEEB code: 393655
- NCES School ID: 01193995
- President: Matthew Stoessel
- Chairman: John Staley V
- Principal: John Wallace
- Chaplain: Fr. Tom Kadlick
- Teaching staff: 58.3 (on an FTE basis)
- Grades: 9–12
- Gender: All-boys
- Enrollment: 744 (2021–22)
  - Grade 9: 182
  - Grade 10: 182
  - Grade 11: 203
  - Grade 12: 177
- Student to teacher ratio: 12.8
- Hours in school day: 6.8
- Campus type: Urban
- Colors: Blue and gold
- Slogan: Man of Faith. Men of Scholarship. Men of Service.
- Fight song: On to Victory
- Athletics: 6A
- Athletics conference: WPIAL
- Nickname: Vikings
- Accreditation: MSA
- Newspaper: The Viking
- Yearbook: Towers
- Annual tuition: $14,500
- Communities served: Oakland
- Affiliation: NCEA
- Website: www.centralcatholichs.com

Pittsburgh Landmark – PHLF
- Designated: 1976
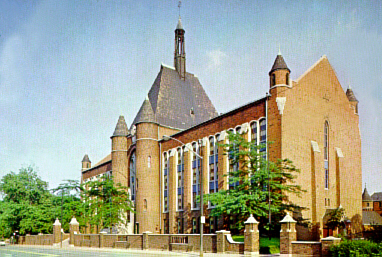
- View from Fifth Ave

Central Catholic High School is a private, Catholic, Lasallian, all-boys college preparatory school in Pittsburgh, Pennsylvania, United States. It is a part of the Diocese of Pittsburgh. The De La Salle Brothers administer and partially staff the school.

== History ==
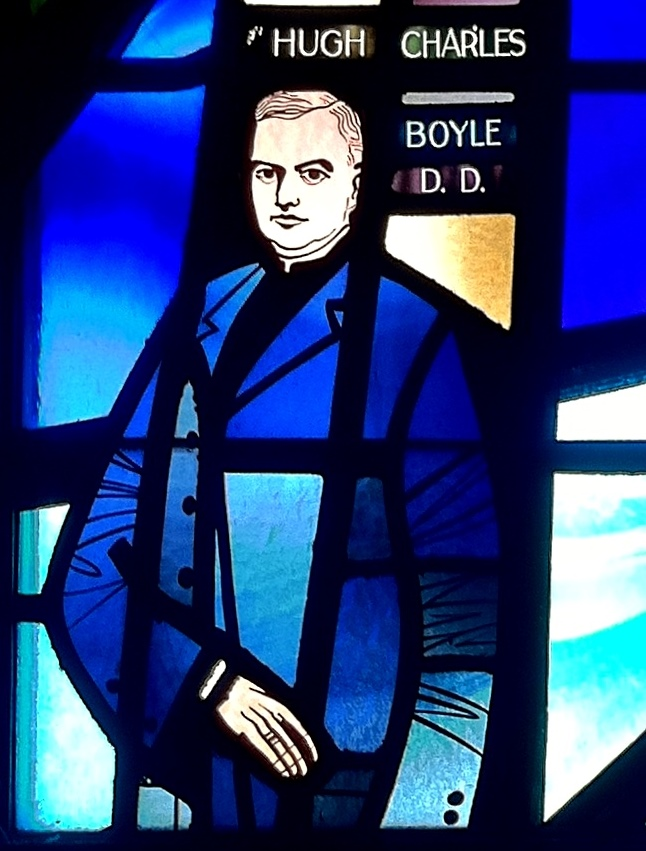
Bishop Boyle

In the 1920s, Bishop Hugh Charles Boyle of the Diocese of Pittsburgh started a program to expand diocesan involvement in education beyond the existing parish schools founded by the predominantly Catholic immigrant population of the city. Boyle invited the Brothers of the Christian Schools (more commonly known as the Christian Brothers) to found an all-male secondary school in Oakland, the academic district of Pittsburgh. The first freshmen class entered in 1927, and Central Catholic's success allowed Boyle to expand on the diocesan network of boys' schools with North Catholic, Serra Catholic, and South Hills Catholic High School.

Although the school initially took students only from the central neighborhoods of Pittsburgh, the decline of regional equivalents such as North Catholic and South Catholic, following both schools' gradual switch to coeducation, eventually attracted students from a more comprehensive geographic and socioeconomic range. Students attend from neighborhoods including Bloomfield and Squirrel Hill, to suburban communities such as Cranberry, Jefferson Hills, and Fox Chapel. The diocese also opened a sister school, Oakland Catholic, in the Oakland area.

== Curriculum ==
Central Catholic's academic courses are divided into five levels:

- Regular (Level 1; 4.0 scale),
- Intermediate (Level 2; 4.4 scale),
- Advanced (Level 3; 4.8 scale),
- Honors (Level 4; 5.4 scale),
- Advanced Placement (Level 5; 6.0 scale).

Class rank is based upon GPA weighted for level. Because the different academic levels are weighted differently, the weighted GPA is based upon a 6.0 rather than a 5.0 scale. Freshmen are placed into course levels within the various departments based on elementary school grades and a standardized placement test given by the school itself. The foreign languages offered are French, Latin, Spanish, and Italian. First-year students may choose to take an elective course in the music or art departments. All first-year students are required to take 1 semester of Gym (Level 1) and 21st Century Technology (Level 3).

Upper-level students have more flexibility in course and department selection. The school offers 16 Advanced Placement courses and over 30 honors courses.

The Baginski Scholars Program is a progressive, interdisciplinary program that enables students who excel academically to participate in activities and discussions that build their knowledge in the social sciences, humanities, and the sciences.

In the 2013–2014 school year, two pilot engineering classes were introduced, and the school planned to construct a new building for STEM subjects. During the same year, a one-to-one computing program was initiated at the high school. iPads were deployed to all freshmen and sophomores.

== Extracurricular activities ==
The school has an athletic history that includes championships for track and field, soccer, swimming, rowing, bowling and football. Other varsity sports offered are basketball, baseball, rugby, tennis, lacrosse, bowling, ice hockey, in-line hockey, golf, cross country, wrestling, and volleyball. Fencing, table tennis, Ultimate frisbee, and disc golf are offered as club sports.

The school has a forensics team, musical theater productions, referred to by the students as "Masque", PJAS participation, student publications, a chess team, and a FIRST Robotics team.

The school's mascot is the Viking. It had a long-standing rivalry with North Catholic High School until enrollment at North Catholic declined. Competition grew increasingly one-sided in Central Catholic's favor. North Allegheny, Pine-Richland, and Woodland Hills have come to replace North Catholic as the school's significant rivals in sports, and Shady Side Academy in academics.

=== Athletics ===
In 2013, the Central Catholic Rowing Team won its first gold medal at SRAA nationals, defeating their rivals, St. Joseph's Prep. On July 23, 2013, a proclamation was made by the city of Pittsburgh declaring that day, July 23, 2013, Central Catholic Crew Day in honor of the win by the crew. The football team defeated Woodland Hills High School, defeating them 27–7 in the WPIAL Quad A championship.

In 2014, Central Catholic's second varsity (2V) crew won its first gold medal. In the last stretch of the race, Central Catholic's boat advanced a marginal length on Gonzaga College High School's 2V, leaving Winter Park High School in third place. Additionally, the first varsity (1V) and the first freshmen (1F) boats received bronze and silver medals, respectively.

In 2015, Central Catholic's undefeated club Ultimate Frisbee team won the Division II PHUL championships, defeating their rivals from Bethel Park. The varsity baseball team also won the 4A WPIAL Championship, defeating Norwin High School.

In 2016, Central Catholic's football team won the first-ever 6A WPIAL Championship. They lost the first-ever 6A PIAA Championship to St. Joseph's. List of PIAA football state champions The golf team won its second 3A WPIAL Championship with a WPIAL record score of 378. The team continued to the PIAA state championship. The team shot a PIAA record score of 297, winning their first state championship in golf. The golf team continued this success by winning the 2017 WPIAL championship.

In 2018, Central Catholic's varsity golf team won its third consecutive WPIAL title with another record-setting round of 372. They continued this success into the PIAA 3A state championship and again claimed first place.

== Campus ==
Built in the 1920s in the National Romantic style, the school building is designated a Pittsburgh History and Landmarks Foundation Historic Landmark. The building has undergone renovations to the classrooms, dining hall, library, theater, writing center, and other areas. The classroom renovation included adding flat-screen televisions, projectors, and other learning technology devices.

On the same campus as the main building, there is a gymnasium, an athletic field, a weight training room, and the STEM building. Next to the main building, on the Neville Street side, is the Brothers' House, where the Brothers of the Christian Schools live.

The school held a groundbreaking ceremony on December 3, 2014, for the new building for STEM subjects. The building opened at the beginning of the 2016–2017 school year for academic use.

In the fall of 2017, the newly renovated counseling center, the De La Salle Center, in the main building, opened. The new center has offices for counselors, a campus ministry room, a presentation room, a classroom, and a test-taking room. Students are assigned, by last name, to one of two full-time counselors. Students also have access to a full-time college counselor, family support services, and a psychologist.
