= Lackawanna Trail High School =

Coordinates: 41.589°N 75.811°W

Lackawanna Trail Junior-Senior High School
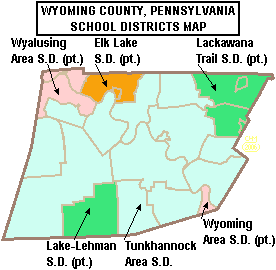

Location
- Tunnel Hill Rd. R.D.1; Factoryville, PA 18419

Information
- Type: Public high school
- Established: 1956
- School district: Lackawanna Trail School District
- Principal: Cody Opalka
- Teaching staff: 41.15 (FTE)
- Grades: 7 - 12
- Enrollment: 427 (2024-2025)
- Student to teacher ratio: 10.38
- Colors: Red, White, Black
- Nickname: Lions
- Information: 570-945-5181
- Website: School website

Lackawanna Trail Junior-Senior High School is a secondary school located in Factoryville, Pennsylvania

== Demographics ==
As of the 2010–11 school year, Lackawanna Trail High School had 550 students and 47 classroom teachers (on an FTE basis) with a student-teacher ratio of 11.70. There were 71 students in 7th grade, 86 in 8th grade, 100 in 9th grade, 92 in 10th grade, 98 in 11th grade and 103 in 12th grade.

== Athletics ==
In 1985, the field hockey team won the Pennsylvania Interscholastic Athletic Association (PIAA) Class AA State Championship, defeating East Pennsboro High School 3–0 in the tournament final game played at Shippensburg.

The Lions football program won seven District 2 Class A titles and nine Lackawanna League championships over eleven years under coach Jeff Wasilchak, who left to become coach of the Lakeland High School program in 2008.

Coach Steve Jervis lead the Lackawanna Trail Lions football team to district II "A" royalty in 2016 and 2018. 2018 was a magical season as the Lions went 14-2 and finished second in the state of Pennsylvania in class A.

== Notable alumni ==
- Jim Saxton (Hugh James Saxton), A Republican member of the United States House of Representatives.
- Don Sherwood, A Republican member of the United States House of Representatives, who represented the 10th Congressional District of Pennsylvania, from 1999 to 2007.
- Yogi Roth, coach, sports analyst and author. Played wide receiver for the University of Pittsburgh. Authored "From PA to LA" in 2010 and is currently a college football scout and commentator for ESPN.
