= Clairton High School =

Coordinates: 40.29379°N 79.88406°W

- 501 Waddell Avenue; Clairton, Pennsylvania 15025; United States

Information
- Type: Public
- School district: Clairton City School District
- Staff: 32.57 (FTE)
- Grades: 6-12
- Student to teacher ratio: 12.90
- Colors: Orange and black
- Athletics conference: WPIAL A League
- Mascot: Bear
- Website: Official website

Clairton High School is located in suburban Pittsburgh, Pennsylvania, in Allegheny County in the city of Clairton, United States. It is part of the Clairton City School District. The school serves students in 6th through 12th grades. The school's mascot is the Bear.

The school's football team, the Clairton Bears, won their 60th consecutive game on November 23, 2012. This win put the team in the record books for the most consecutive wins for any high school football team in Pennsylvania. The win broke the record set from 1997 to 2000 by Central Bucks West, a suburban Philadelphia school.

== Notable alumni ==
- Nancy Y. Bekavac, president of Scripps College
- Tyler Boyd, NFL wide receiver

== Notable faculty ==
- Dale Hamer - NFL referee
