= Mount Carmel Area High School =

School in Mount Carmel, Pennsylvania, US

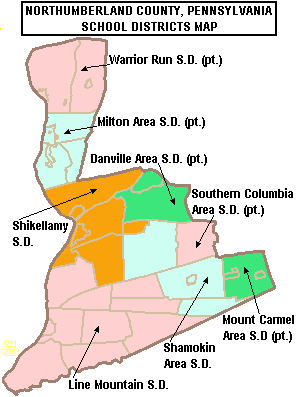
- Shows a portion of Mount Carmel ASD

Location
- 600 West 5th Street; Mount Carmel, Northumberland County, Columbia County, Pennsylvania 17851; United States; 40.7912°N 76.4220°W

Information
- Type: Public
- Principal: Mrs. Lisa Varano
- Teaching staff: 26.93 (FTE)
- Grades: 9-12
- Enrollment: 493 (2023–2024)
- Student to teacher ratio: 18.31
- Language: English
- Mascot: Tornadoes
- Website: http://www.mca.k12.pa.us/

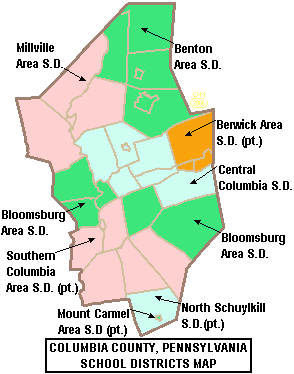
School District regions in Columbia County

Mount Carmel Area High School is located at 600 West 5th Street, Mount Carmel, Northumberland County, Pennsylvania. In 2016, enrollment was 420 pupils in 9th through 12th grades. The school employed 39 teachers. It is the sole high school operated by the Mount Carmel Area School District.

High school students may choose to attend the Northumberland County Career Technology Center for training in the construction and mechanical trades. In 2016, 76 MCAHS pupils attended the CTC school. For the 2014–15 school year, several Mount Carmel resident students chose to enroll in public, cyber charter schools, rather than attend the district's high school. There is also a high bullying rate, with not much control, 10:1 student to teacher

The Central Susquehanna Intermediate Unit IU16 provides the district with a wide variety of services like: specialized education for disabled students; state mandated training on recognizing and reporting child abuse; speech and visual disability services; criminal background check processing for prospective employees and professional development for staff and faculty.

== Extracurriculars ==
The Mount Carmel Area School District offers a variety of clubs, activities and an extensive sports program. Mount Carmel Area School District operates an indoor pool which it rents to the general public for pool parties.

=== Sports ===
The district funds:

Boys

- Baseball - AAA
- Basketball- AAA
- Cross country - Class A
- Football - AAA
- Golf -AA
- Swimming and diving - AA
- Track and field - AA
- Wrestling - AA

Girls

- Basketball - AAA
- Cross country - AA
- Golf - AA
- Soccer - A
- Swimming and diving - AA
- Track and field - AA

Junior high school sports

Boys

- Basketball
- Cross country
- Football
- Track and field
- Wrestling

Girls

- Basketball
- Cross country
- Softball
- Track and field
- According to PIAA directory July 2017
