= Steel Valley School District =

School district in Pennsylvania

Coordinates: 40.40029°N 79.90236°W

Address
- 220 E. Oliver Road Munhall, Pennsylvania, 15120; United States

District information
- Type: Public

Other information
- Website: www.steelvalleysd.org

Steel Valley Senior High School

Location
- 3113 Main Street; Munhall, (Allegheny County), Pennsylvania 15120; United States

Information
- Type: Public high school
- Principal: John Strom
- Staff: 39.15 (FTE)
- Enrollment: 400 (2022-23)
- Student to teacher ratio: 10.22
- Colors: Maroon and gold
- Nickname: Ironmen

The Steel Valley School District is a small, suburban public school district in the state of Pennsylvania. It is located to the southeast of the city of Pittsburgh. It serves the boroughs of Homestead, Munhall, and West Homestead, former mill towns. The Steel Valley School District encompasses approximately four square miles. According to 2005 local census data, it served a resident population of 18,340. In 2009, the district's resident per capita income was $16,902, while median family income was $40,295.

The district operates three schools: Steel Valley Elementary School for students in grades K–5, Steel Valley Middle School for grades 6–8, and Steel Valley Senior High School for grades 9–12.

Notable landmarks within the district include the site of the Homestead Strike, The Waterfront shopping complex, Sandcastle Waterpark, and the headquarters of the Allegheny Intermediate Unit.
