= Riverside School District (Pennsylvania) =

School district in northeastern Pennsylvania, U.S.

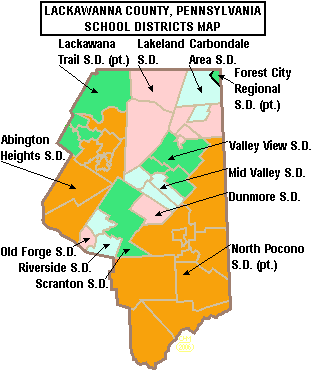

Location
- 300 Davis Street Taylor, Lackawanna County, Pennsylvania, 18517; United States of America

District information
- Type: Public school

Students and staff
- District mascot: Vikings
- Colors: Red, blue

Other information
- Website: www.riversidesd.com

The Riverside School District is a small, suburban public school district in Lackawanna County, Pennsylvania which formed in 1961. The district serves the boroughs of Moosic and Taylor, both suburbs of Scranton. Riverside School District encompasses approximately 12 square miles (31 km^{2}). According to 2000 local census data, the district serves a resident population of 12,050. By 2010, the district's population declined to 11,978 people. The educational attainment levels for the school district population (25 years old and over) were 87% high school graduates and 21.7% college graduates.

According to the Pennsylvania Budget and Policy Center, 35.8% of the district's pupils lived at 185% or below the Federal Poverty level as shown by their eligibility for the federal free or reduced price school meal programs in 2012. In 2009, the district residents' per capita income was $18,780, while the median family income was $45,411. In the Commonwealth, the median family income was $49,501 and the United States median family income was $49,445, in 2010. In Lackawanna County, the median household income was $43,673. By 2013, the median household income in the United States rose to $52,100.

The Riverside School District operates two elementary schools: Riverside Elementary West School (kindergarten to second grades), and Riverside Elementary East School (third grade to sixth grade) and Riverside Junior-Senior High School provides grades 7–12. High school students may choose to attend Wilkes-Barre Area Career and Technical Center for training in the construction and mechanical trades. The Northeastern Educational Intermediate Unit (IU19) provides the district with a wide variety of services like specialized education for disabled students and hearing, speech and visual disability services and professional development for staff and faculty.

== Extracurriculars ==
The Riverside School District offers a variety of clubs, activities and sports.

=== Sports ===
The district funds:

Varsity

Boys

- Baseball - AA
- Basketball- AA
- Cross country - A
- Football - A
- Soccer - A
- Golf- AA
- Track and field - AA

Girls

- Basketball - AA
- Cross country - A
- Softball - AA
- Tennis - AA
- Track and field - AA
- Golf- AA

Junior high school sports

Boys

- Baseball
- Basketball
- Cross country
- Football
- Soccer
- Track and field
- Golf

Girls

- Basketball
- Cross country
- Softball
- Track and field
- Golf

According to PIAA directory July 2014

=== Clubs and activities ===
Riverside School District offers over twenty clubs to the student population.

- Art Club
- Audio/Visual Club
- Book Club
- Drama Club
- FBLA
- World Languages and Cultures Club
- Math Club
- National Honor Society
- Mass Media Club
- SADD
- Science Club
- Snowboard/Ski Club
- Student Council
- Vikings Read!Club
- Viking Nation
- Yearbook
- Chorus
- Gifted Program
- Marching Band
- Marching Units
- Scholastic Bowl Team
- Reading Competitions
- SADD
- Student Council
