= Clairton City School District =

School district in Pennsylvania

Clairton City Public Schools
- Clairton City School District located in southern Allegheny County

Address
- 501 Waddell Avenue Clairton, Allegheny County, Pennsylvania, 15025-1559; United States

District information
- Type: Public

Students and staff
- District mascot: Bears

Other information
- Website: www.ccsdbears.org

The Clairton City School District is a diminutive, suburban, public school district. The Clairton City School District encompasses approximately 1-square-mile (2.6 km^{2}) serving the City of Clairton in Allegheny County, Pennsylvania. According to 2000 federal census data, it served a resident population of 8,491. By 2010, the district's population declined to 6,797 people. In 2009, Clairton City School District residents' per capita income was $14,608, while the median family income was $31,539. In the Commonwealth, the median family income was $49,501 and the United States median family income was $49,445, in 2010.

Clairton City School District operates Clairton Middle School High School (7th-12th) and Clairton Elementary School (K-6th) both housed in a single building.

== Extracurriculars ==
Clairton City School District offers a variety of clubs, activities, community outreach programs, and sports.

=== Sports ===
The District funds:

Boys

- Baseball - A
- Basketball- A
- Football - A
- Track and Field - AA

Girls

- Basketball - A
- Cheer - AAAA
- Track and Field - AA

Middle School Sports

Boys

- Basketball

Girls

- Basketball

According to PIAA directory July 2013
