= South Williamsport Area School District =

School district in Pennsylvania

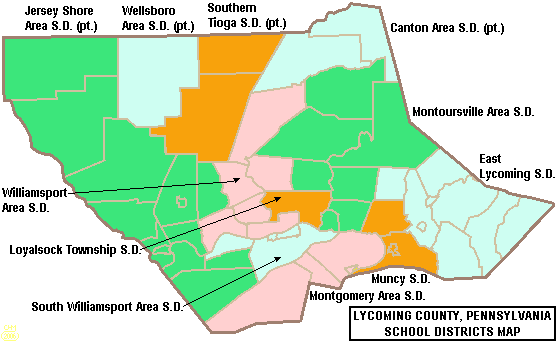

Address
- 515 West Central Ave. South Williamsport, Pennsylvania, (Lycoming County), 17702-7206; United States

District information
- Type: Public
- Grades: K-12
- School board: 9 elected members

Students and staff
- District mascot: Mountaineer
- Colors: Royal blue and white

Other information
- Website: www.swasd.org

The South Williamsport Area School District is a small public school district in Lycoming County, Pennsylvania, in the United States. The school serves several suburbs of Williamsport, including South Williamsport, DuBoistown, Susquehanna Township, and Armstrong Township. The district encompasses approximately 36 square miles (93 km^{2}). According to 2000 federal census data, it served a resident population of 9,400. By 2010, the district's population declined to 9,268 people. In 2009, the district residents’ per capita income was $18,650, while the median family income was $41,002. In the Commonwealth, the median family income was $49,501 and the United States median family income was $49,445, in 2010. By 2013, the median household income in the United States rose to $52,100.

The district operates two schools: Central Elementary, and South Williamsport Area Junior Senior High School.

== Extracurriculars ==
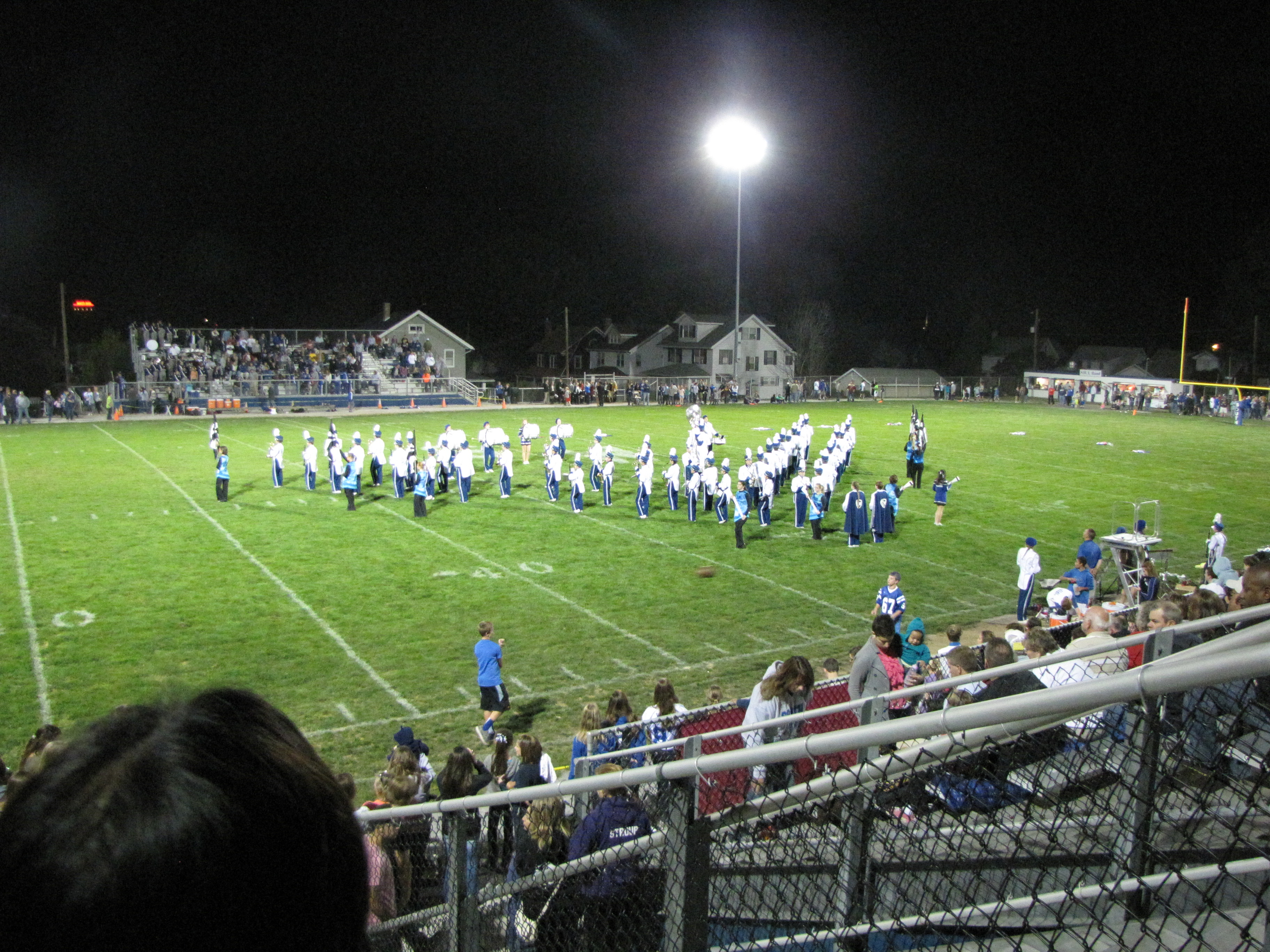
South Williamsport Mounties Marching Band in 2011

The South Williamsport Area School District offers a variety of clubs, activities and sports.

=== Sports ===
The district funds:

Boys

- Baseball - AA
- Basketball- AA
- Football - A
- Golf - AA
- Soccer - A
- Tennis - AA
- Track and field - AA
- Wrestling - AA
- Cross Country - AA

Girls

- Basketball - AA
- Golf - AA
- Soccer (gall) - A
- Softball - A
- Girls' tennis - AA
- Track and field - AA

Junior High School Sports

Boys

- Basketball
- Football
- Soccer
- Wrestling

Girls

- Basketball
- Soccer (fall)
- Softball

According to PIAA directory July 2012
