= Bishop Guilfoyle High School =

Bishop Guilfoyle Academy
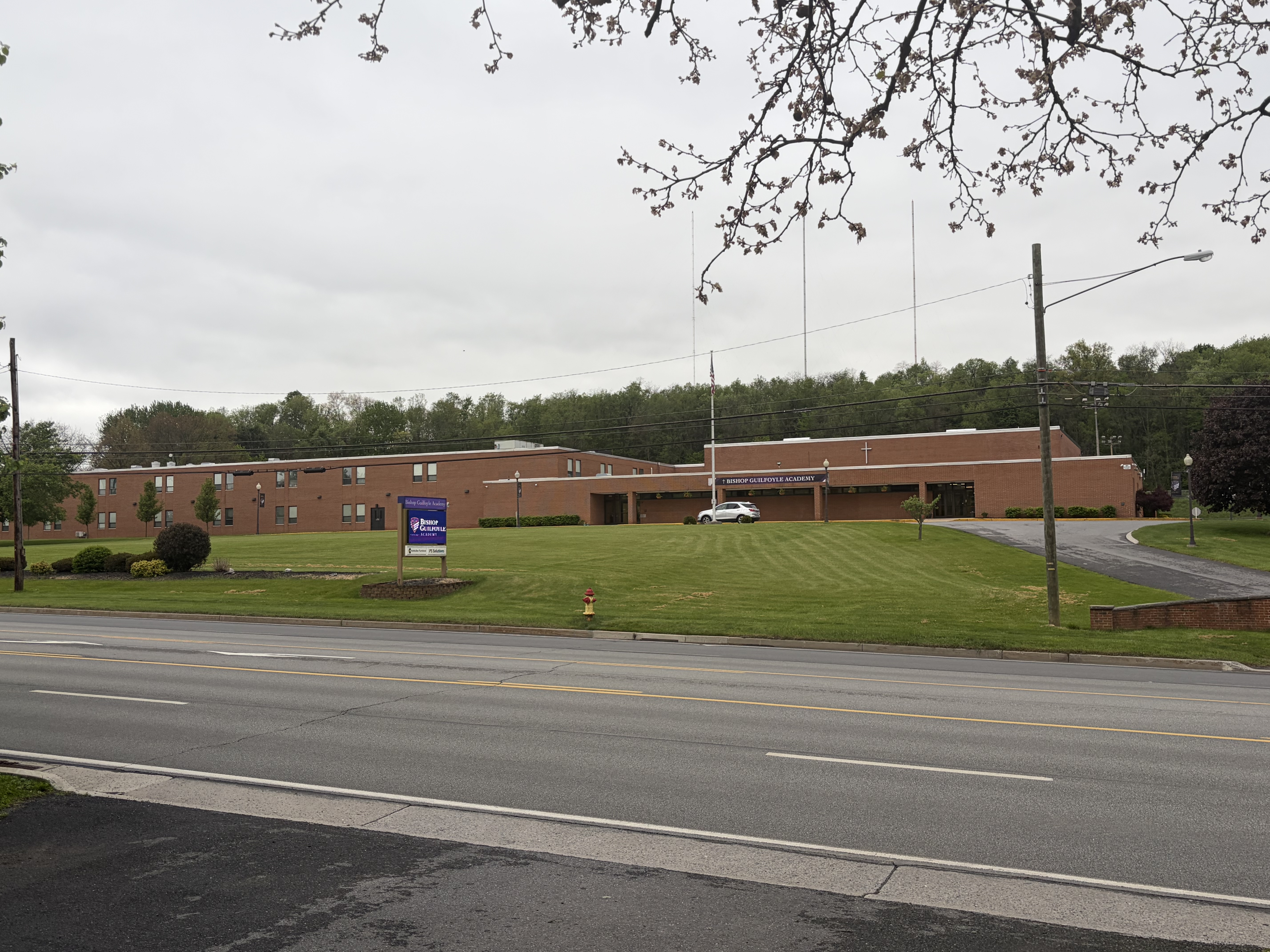

Location
- 2400 Pleasant Valley Boulevard; Altoona, (Blair County), Pennsylvania 16602; United States; 40°29′44″N 78°23′45″W

Information
- Type: Private, coeducational
- Motto: Bonitas, Disciplina and Scientia (Goodness, Discipline and Knowledge)
- Religious affiliation: Roman Catholic
- Established: 1922
- President: Joseph Adams
- Principal: Joan Donnelly
- Grades: 6-12
- Student to teacher ratio: 11:1
- Colors: Purple and gold
- Athletics: PIAA
- Mascot: Marauder
- Accreditation: Middle States Association of Colleges and Schools
- Newspaper: Marauder Mirror
- Tuition: $12,300 (2019)
- Alumni: 10,000
- Website: bishopguilfoyle.org

Bishop Guilfoyle High School is an independent, private, college preparatory high school located in Altoona, Pennsylvania. It was founded in 1922. The school's motto is "Goodness, Discipline and Knowledge".

== History ==
The school was originally Altoona Catholic High School, however, it was renamed in honor of Richard Thomas Guilfoyle following his death.

== Academics ==
Bishop Guilfoyle serves students of all faith traditions in grades 9-12 and in 2015 added grades 6, 7 and 8 in a selective pre-AP program. BG offers numerous AP classes and dual enrollment courses affiliated with three post-secondary institutions. Four career paths are offered: liberal arts, business, engineering and technology, and health sciences. BG is accredited by the Middle States Association of Colleges and Schools.

== Sports ==
Bishop Guilfoyle competes in 19 varsity sports the Pennsylvania Interscholastic Athletic Association (PIAA).

In basketball, the boys team captured state championships in 1930, 1937, 1967, and 1970, while the girls won PIAA state titles in 1984 (AA), 1991 (AA), 1993 (A), 2007 (A), 2009 (A), 2010 (A), and 2021 (A).

The school's football team has won the PIAA class A title four times. They first won in 2014 over Clairton High School 19–18, finishing undefeated in their 16 games. They went 16–0 again in 2015, defeating Farrell High School for their second state championship. Bishop Guilfoyle then captured their third straight state title after going 15-0 during the 2016 season by defeating Clairton High School 17-0. Bishop Guilfoyle most recently won their fourth title after going 11-4 in the 2021 season with a defeat over Redbank Valley High School. The final score being 21-14.
