= Middletown Area High School =

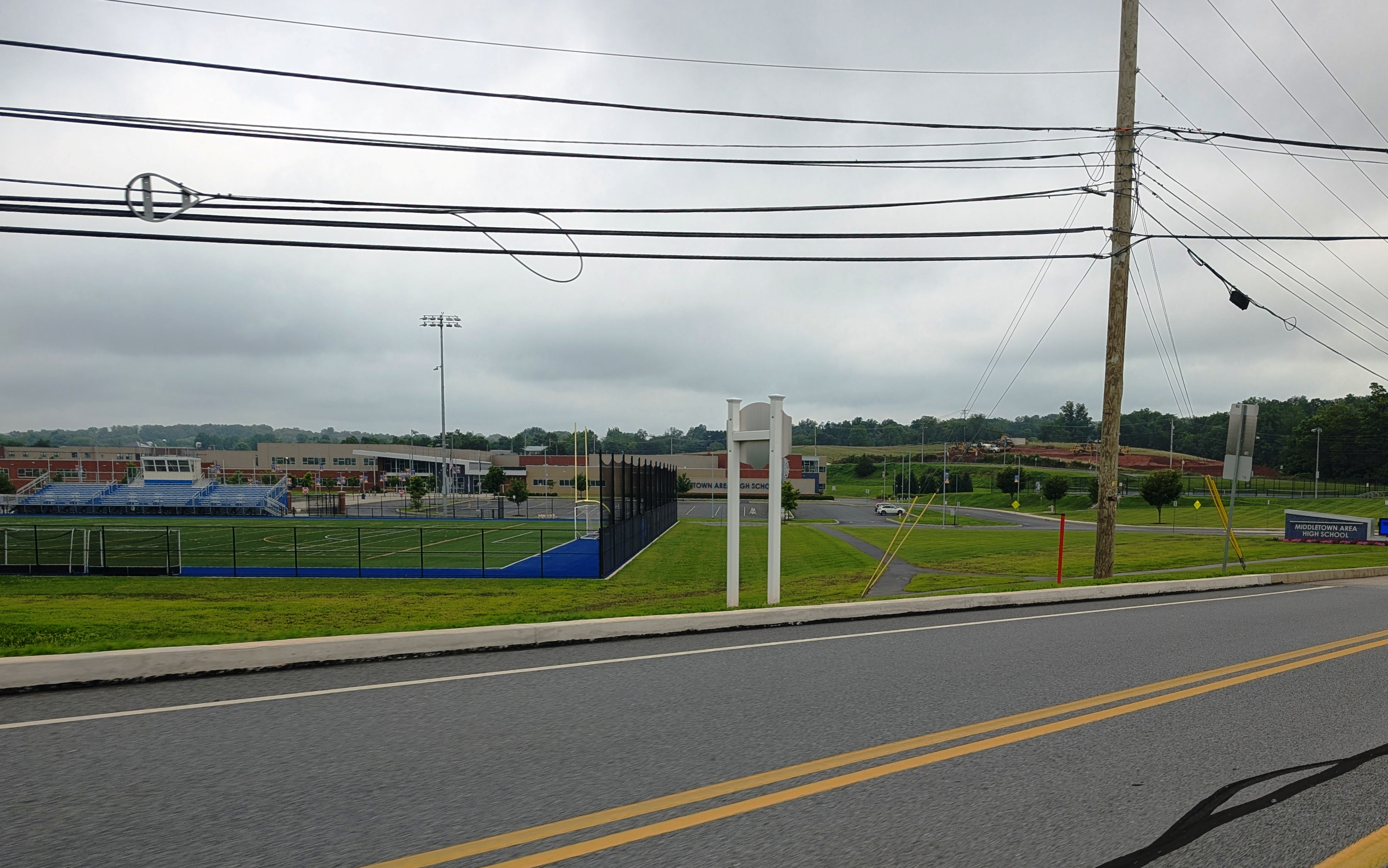
- Campus as seen from PA 441

Location
- 1155 North Union Street, Middletown address, Dauphin County, Pennsylvania 17057; United States; 40.2115°N 76.7378°W

Information
- Type: Public
- School district: Middletown Area School District
- Principal: David Frey
- Faculty: 52 (2011)
- Grades: 9-12
- Enrollment: 727 (2023–2024)
- Language: English
- Colors: Blue and Gold
- Mascot: Blue Raider
- Feeder schools: Middletown Area Middle School
- Website: http://www.raiderweb.org/

Middletown Area High School is a small, suburban, public high school in Lower Swatara Township, Pennsylvania, with a Middletown post office address. It is the only high school operated by Middletown Area School District. Middletown Area High School serves: the boroughs of Middletown and Royalton and Lower Swatara Township in Dauphin County. In the 2015–2016 school year, enrollment was 653 pupils in 9th through 12th grades.

== Extracurriculars ==
Middletown Area High School offers students a wide variety of clubs, activities and an extensive sports program. The district mascot is a Blue Raider and the colors are blue and gold. The school's marching band is the Blue Wave Marching Band.

=== Sports ===
In 2001, the boys soccer team won the Class AA State title. In 2016, the football team set a new record of wins in a season. The team went 14-1, with their only loss to Beaver Falls in the Class AAA State Championship game. The 2017 team would tie that record, only falling to Quaker Valley in the Class AAA State Championship. The District funds 17 varsity sports:

Boys

- Baseball - AAAA
- Basketball - AAAA
- Cross Country - AA
- Football - AAA
- Golf - AA
- Soccer - AA
- Tennis - AA
- Track and Field - AAA
- Wrestling - AA

Girls

- Basketball - AAA
- Cheerleading
- Cross Country - AA
- Field Hockey - A
- Soccer - AA
- Softball - AAA
- Tennis - AA
- Track and Field - AA
- Volleyball - AA

According to PIAA directory January 2017
