= Old Forge School District =

School district in Pennsylvania

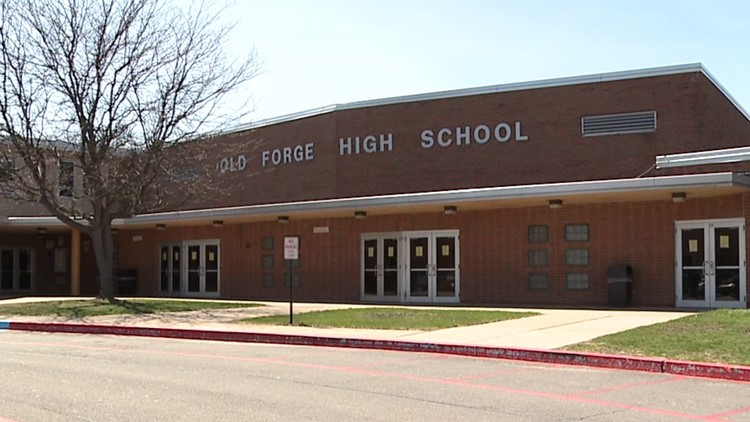
- Old Forge High School

Location
- 300 Marion Street; Old Forge, PA 18518 Lackawanna; United States

District information
- Type: Public School
- Motto: Home of the Blue Devils
- Established: 1910

Students and staff
- Colors: Blue and gold

Other information
- Website: School web site

The Old Forge School District is a diminutive, suburban, public school district serving the municipality of Old Forge, Pennsylvania, a suburb of Scranton in Lackawanna County. The district is one of the 500 public school districts of Pennsylvania. The district encompasses 3 square miles (7.8 km^{2}). According to 2000 federal census data, it served a resident population of 8,798. By 2010, the district's population declined to 8,310 people. The educational attainment levels for the Old Forge School District population (25 years old and over) were 89.4% high school graduates and 22.6% college graduates.

According to the Pennsylvania Budget and Policy Center, 41.7% of the district's pupils lived at 185% or below the Federal Poverty level as shown by their eligibility for the federal free or reduced price school meal programs in 2012. In 2009, the Old Forge School District residents' per capita income was $19,228, while the median family income was just $46,152. In Lackawanna County, the median household income was $43,673. In the Commonwealth, the median family income was $49,501 and the United States median family income was $49,445, in 2010.

Old Forge School District has a cooperative agreement with Luzerne County Community College.

Old Forge School District operates two schools: Old Forge Elementary School (K–6th) and Old Forge Junior Senior High School (7th-12th). The Northeastern Educational Intermediate Unit IU19 provides the district with a wide variety of services like specialized education for disabled students and hearing, speech and visual disability services and professional development for staff and faculty. Old Forge High School students have access to Wilkes Area Career and Technology Center which is the neighboring region's vocational technical school.

== History ==
Since 1910, the town of Old Forge has had its own school district. Originally, there were several elementary schools throughout Old Forge serving each section of town, such as Central, Lawrenceville, Moosic Road, Sussex, Sibley, and Rendham. The high school was located on South Main Street (the site of the recently closed Ace Hardware, now Driscoll's), which housed grades 9–12. A separate building in the rear of the main high school served as another elementary school and a gymnasium. This structure was destroyed by fire in the late 1950s.

In 1956, it was decided that all schools should be consolidated into one large building. Many feel that it was the building of a new school that saved Old Forge from the growing trend of jointures that was taking place throughout the area in the 1960s and 1970s. Groundbreaking began on July 21, 1956, at the current site located on Marion Street. The new school opened for the 1960–1961 school year and is still in use to this day, receiving major renovations during the 1990s and 2020s. All the old schools have since been demolished.

== Extracurriculars ==
Old Forge School District offers a variety of clubs, activities and sports.

== Sports ==
The district funds:

Varsity

Boys

- Baseball - AA
- Basketball- AA
- Football - A
- Golf - AA
- Soccer - AA

Girls

- Basketball - AA
- Golf - AA
- Softball - AA

Junior high school sports

Boys

- Baseball
- Basketball
- Cross country
- Football
- Golf
- Soccer

Girls

- Basketball
- Softball

According to PIAA directory July 2014

The Blue Devil

History

The Old Forge Blue Devils of Old Forge High School have a long, rich history in the area of sports. During the 1950s and 1960s, Old Forge dominated the area in football and basketball, winning several league championships and conference titles. During the 1950s, Old Forge compiled the highest winning percentage for football in the entire state.

The school has been to the state championship game five times and has won twice. In 1932, Old Forge beat St. Vincent High from Erie 24-19 for the state basketball championship. At the time, schools were not divided by class, thus there was only one state champion in the entire state. Sixty years later in 1992, Old Forge won the Class "AA" state championship in baseball by beating Ridgway 15–5. In 2009, the girls softball team reached the state championship game, only to lose 1–0 to Curwensville. In the 2013–2014 school year, the Old Forge football team and the girls basketball team both reached the state finals, with the girls basketball team repeating a trip to the state finals in the 2014–2015 season.

Old Forge has had a long-standing rival with neighboring town Taylor that goes back to 1939 when Old Forge beat the Taylor Trojans 2–0 in the first meeting of the two teams on the football field. Thus began the "Old Forge-Taylor Football Rivalry". A tradition began in 1940 of the two teams meeting on Thanksgiving Day. This continued until 1974. The rivalry was on hiatus from 1988 until 2000, when the two teams met renewing the heated rivalry between the two neighboring towns.

Below is a partial list of the achievements made in basketball, football and baseball/softball.

=== Basketball ===
1975-76 Varsity Basketball

Year	Award	Additional awards, and notes
1924	Suburban County League champions	
1930	District 2 - Class "A" champions	Anthracite League champions/Eastern Class "A" State Semi-Finalists
1932	District 2 - Class "A" champions/Anthracite League champions	Pennsylvania State Champions
1941	Lackawanna League champions	
1948	Lackawanna League champions	
1949	District 2 - Class "A" champions	Lackawanna League champions/Eastern Class "A" State Semi-Finalists
1951	Lackawanna League champions	
1952	Lynett Invitational Tournament champions	
1952	Lackawanna League champions	
1953	District 2 - Class "A" champions	Eastern Class "A" State Quarter-Finalists
1958	District 2 - Class "A" champions	Lynett Invitational Tournament champions
1959	District 2 - Class "A" champions	PIAA Inter-District Champions/Eastern Class "A" State Semi-Finalists
1985	District 2 - Class "A" champions	Eastern Class "A" State Semi-Finalists
1988	District 2 - Class "A" champions (Girls)	Eastern Class "A" State Semi-Finalists
1989	District 2 - Class "A" champions (Girls)	Eastern Class "A" State Finalists
1992	District 2 - Class "A" champions	Eastern Class "A" State Semi-Finalists
1992	District 2 - Class "A" champions (Girls)	Eastern Class "A" State Quarter-Finalists
2001	District 2 - Class "A" champions	Eastern Class "A" State Finalists
2004	Lackawanna League - Division 2 South champions	
2005	Lackawanna League - Division 2 South champions	
2007	District 2 Class "A" champions/Lackawanna League Champions	Eastern Class "A" State Semi-Finalists/Season record 28-1
2008	District 2 Class "A" champions	Eastern Class "A" State Quarter-Finalists
2008	District 2 Class "A" champions (Girls)	Eastern Class "A" State Semi-Finalists
2009	District 2 Class "A" champions	
2009	District 2 Class "A" champions (Girls)	
2010	District 2 Class "A" champions	
2010	District 2 Class "A" champions (Girls)	
2011	District 2 Class "A" champions	
2012	District 2 Class "A" champions (Girls)	Eastern Class "A" State Semi-Finalists
2013	District 2 Class "A" champions (Girls)	Lackawanna League Div. III/IV Champions - Season Record 25-1
2014	District 2 Class "A" champions	
2014	District 2 Class "A" champions (Girls)	Eastern Class "A" Champions
2015	District 2 Class "A" champions	
2015	District 2 Class "A" champions (Girls)	Eastern Class "A" Champions
2016	District 2 Class "A" champions	
2017	District 2 Class "AA" champions (Girls)	
2018	District 2 Class "AA" champions (Girls)	
2020	District 2 Class "AA" champions (Girls)	
2021	District 2 Class "AA" champions	Eastern Class "AA" State Finalists
2025	District 2 Class "AA" champions	Eastern Class "AA" State Quarter-Finalists
2026	District 2 Class "AA" champions	

=== Football ===
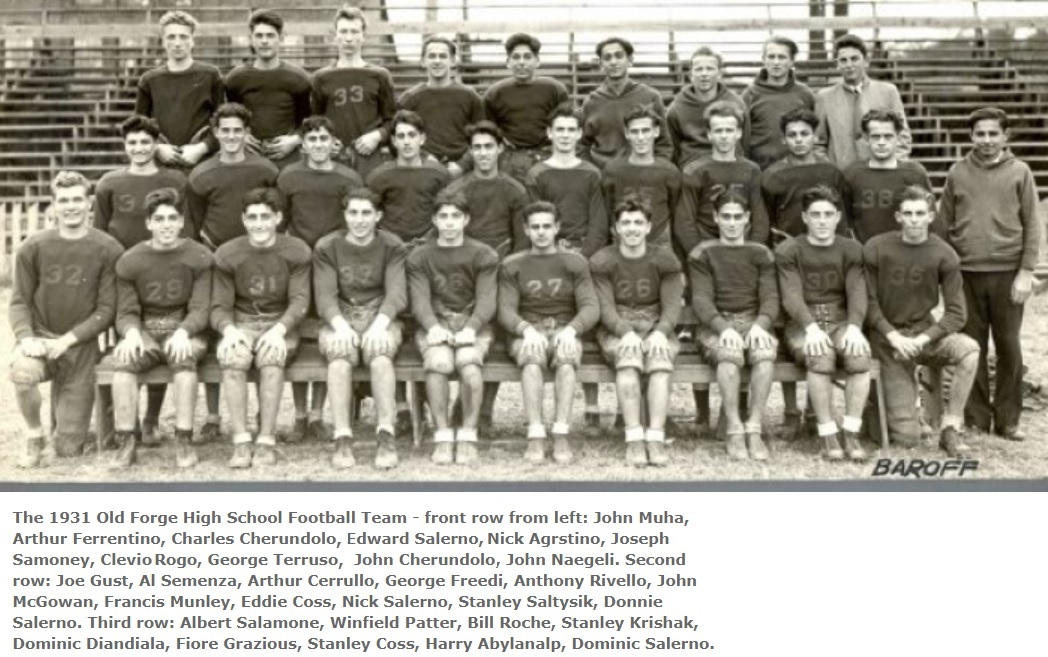
1931 Football team

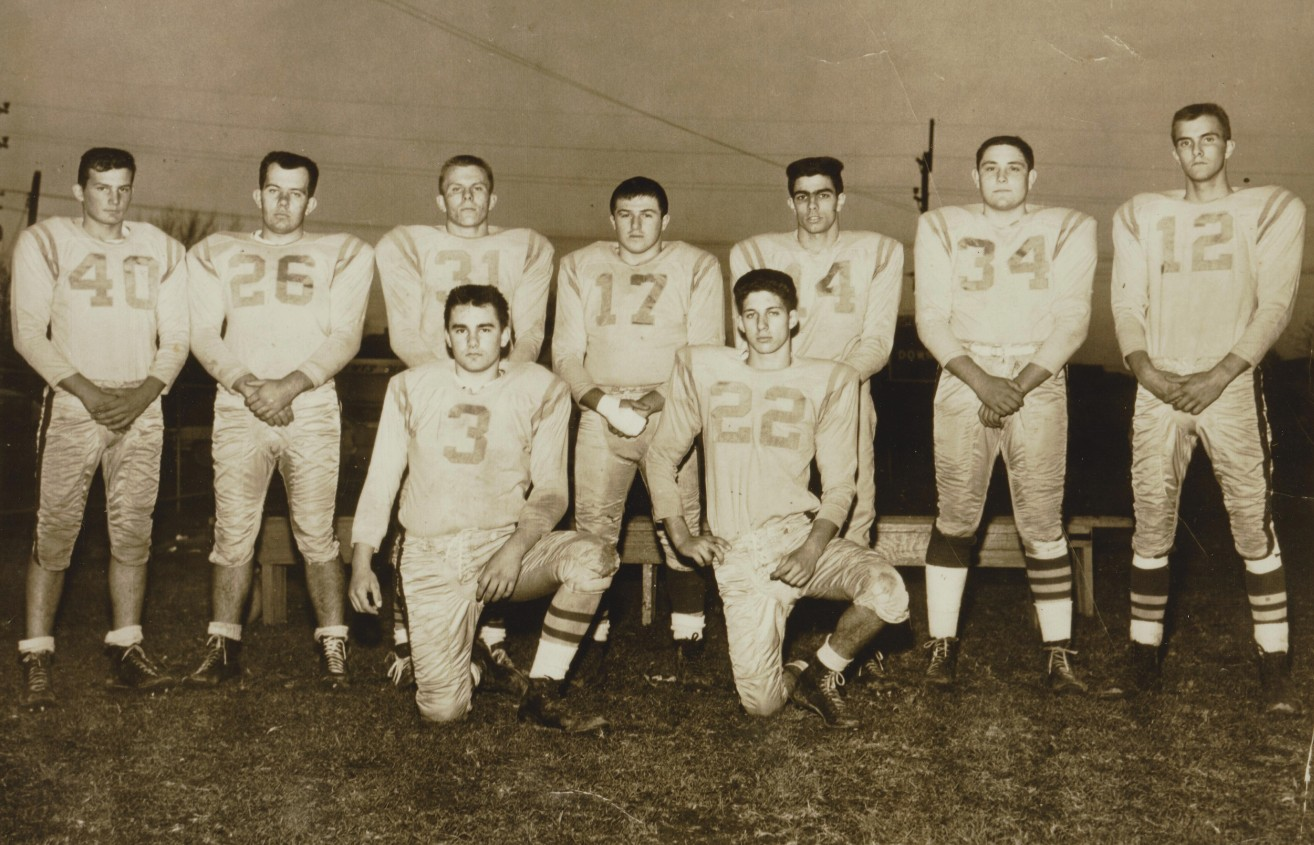
1961 Eastern Conference Lineman

Year	Award	Additional awards, and notes
1912	Anthracite Conference champions	
1949	Lackawanna Conference champions	
1952	Lackawanna Conference champions	Eastern Conference champions (Old Forge 6 - Sunbury 0)
1954	Lackawanna Conference champions	
1955	Lackawanna Conference champions	
1956	Lackawanna Conference champions	
1958	Lackawanna Conference champions	Eastern Conference champions (Old Forge 21 - Shenandoah 0)
1961	Eastern Conference champions	Old Forge 13 - Coal Township 6
1975	PIAA Bowl champions	Big 11 vs. Wyoming Valley Conference
1987	Suburban Conference champions	Eastern Conference - Div. III North champions
1988	Suburban Conference champions	Eastern Conference - Div. III North champions
1989	Suburban Conference champions	Eastern Conference - Div. III champions (Old Forge 26 - Nativity 7)
1993	District 2 - Class "A" champions	
1998	Lackawanna Conference champions (Freshman)	
1999	Lackawanna Conference champions (Freshman)	
2002	Lackawanna Conference champions (Freshman)	
2005	Eastern Conference - Division I champions	Old Forge 40 - Bishop O'Hara 28
2006	District 2 - Class "A" champions	Lackawanna Division III champions
2009	Lackawanna Division III Champions	Undefeated regular season (10-0)
2011	District 2 - Class "A" champions	Old Forge 47 - Riverside 6
2013	District 2 - Class "A" champions	Pennsylvania Class "A" Eastern Champions
2014	District 2 - Class "A" champions	
2015	District 2 - Class "A" champions	
2017	District 2 - Class "A" champions	
2020	District 2 - Class "A" champions	
2021	District 2 - Class "A" champions	
2024	Eastern Conference - Class "1A/2A" champions	

=== Baseball/softball ===
Year	Award	Additional awards, and notes
1981	Lackawanna League champions (Girls Softball)	
1984	Lackawanna League Southern Division champions (Boys Baseball)	
1989	Lackawanna League Southern Division champions (Boys Baseball)	
1991	Lackawanna League Southern Division champions (Boys Baseball)	District 2 Class "AA" champions
1991	Lackawanna League champions (Girls Softball)	
1992	Lackawanna League Southern Division champions (Boys Baseball)	
1992	District 2 Class "AA" champions (Boys Baseball)	Pennsylvania State Champions - Class "AA"
2000	District 2 Class "A" Silver Medal (Girls Softball)	
2006	Lackawanna League Division IV champions (Boys Baseball)	
2007	Lackawanna League Division IV champions (Boys Baseball)	
2007	District 2 Class "A" champions (Boys Baseball)	
2008	District 2 Class "A" champions (Boys Baseball)	
2008	District 2 Class "A" champions (Girls Softball)	
2009	District 2 Class "A" champions (Boys Baseball)	State Class "A" Semi-Finalists
2009	District 2 Class "A" champions (Girls Softball)	State Class "A" Finalists
2010	District 2 Class "A" champions (Boys Baseball)	
2010	District 2 Class "A" champions (Girls Softball)	
2011	District 2 Class "A" champions (Boys Baseball)	Fifth straight division title
2011	District 2 Class "A" champions (Girls Softball)	Fourth straight division title
2013	District 2 Class "A" champions (Boys Baseball)	
2013	District 2 Class "A" champions (Girls Softball)	
2014	District 2 Class "A" champions (Girls Softball)	
2017	District 2 Class "AA" champions (Boys Baseball)	
2019	District 2 Class "A" champions (Boys Baseball)	
2019	District 2 Class "A" champions (Girls Softball)	
2021	District 2 Class "A" champions (Girls Softball)	
2022	District 2 Class "A" champions (Girls Softball)	
2023	District 2 Class "A" champions (Girls Softball)	
2024	District 2 Class "A" champions (Girls Softball)	State Class "A" Semi-Finalists
