= Duquesne City School District =

School district in Pennsylvania

- Duquesne City School District is shown in orange the mid right-hand area

Address
- 300 Kennedy Avenue Duquesne, Allegheny County, Pennsylvania, 15110; United States
- Coordinates: 40.37170°N 79.84751°W

District information
- Type: Public
- Superintendent: Dr. Sue Mariani
- School board: Allegheny Intermediate Unit
- NCES District ID: 4208010

Students and staff
- Students: 357 (2020-2021)
- Staff: 33.50 (on an FTE basis)
- Student–teacher ratio: 10.66

Other information
- Website: www.dukecitysd.org

Duquesne City School District is a small suburban public school district in the state of Pennsylvania. It is located in the east hills of Allegheny County, and serves the City of Duquesne, a former mill town on the banks of the Monongahela River. Duquesne City School District encompasses two square miles. As of 2019, the district's population was 5,543.

In 2019, median household income was $29,844. The Pennsylvania Department of Education reports that 88.5% of the student population are economically disadvantaged. Historically, 100% of pupils receive federal free or reduced-price meals due to family poverty. The school is a federally designated Title I school.

The district operates one school, the Duquesne Education Center, which serves students in Pre-Kindergarten through seventh grade. During the 2020–2021 school year, the Duquesne City School District provided basic educational services to 357 pupils through the employment of 33.5 full-time teachers, 31.5 full-time and part-time support personnel and one administrator. Of those enrolled, 83 students received special education services. The student–teacher ratio was reported as 10.66.

== Recovery plan ==
The Pennsylvania Department of Education closed the district's high school prior to the 2007–2008 school year. Since the closing, students in grades nine through twelve have been offered the option to attend a school in West Mifflin Area or East Allegheny School Districts. This recovery plan was initiated as a response to low standardized test scores and a lack of extra-curricular activities and sports programs within Duquesne City School District. The Allegheny Intermediate Unit operated the school during the recovery phase until a receiver (or Chief Recovery Officer) was appointed to oversee district-wide systems, policies and procedures.

=== Progress since 2021 ===
As part of the district’s state-controlled recovery plan, prior to the start of the 2012–2013 school year, the district began offering students in seventh and eighth grades tuition vouchers to matriculate into West Mifflin Area or East Allegheny School Districts. The start of the 2021–2022 school year marked the return of in-person instruction for seventh grade students in Duquesne City School District. The district welcomed back 8th graders in the 2022-2023 year which also marked the return of some of the district's sports programs.
