= South Williamsport Area Junior Senior High School =

Location
- 700 Percy St, South Williamsport, PA 17702; Williamsport, Pennsylvania; South Williamsport, Pennsylvania; United States; 41.2261°N 76.9961°W

Information
- Type: Public
- Grades: 7-12
- Enrollment: 642 pupils (2012 grades 7-12)
- Colors: Blue and White
- Mascot: Mountie
- Website: https://www.swasd.org/highschool/

South Williamsport Area Junior Senior High School is a public junior and senior high school located in South Williamsport, Pennsylvania. It is part of the South Williamsport Area School District.

== Overview ==
South Williamsport Area Junior Senior High School is located at 700 Percy Street, South Williamsport. According to the National Center for Education Statistics, in 2012, the school reported an enrollment of 642 pupils in grades 7th through 12th, with 178 pupils eligible for a federal free or reduced price lunch due to the family meeting the federal poverty level. The school employed 50 teachers yielding a student-teacher ratio of 12:1. According to a report by the Pennsylvania Department of Education, 1 teachers were rated "Non‐Highly Qualified" under No Child Left Behind.

South Williamsport Area Junior Senior High School achieved 82.2 out of 100. Reflects on grade level reading, mathematics and science achievement. In reading/literature, 82% were on grade level. In Algebra 1, 83% showed on grade level skills. In Biology, 72% showed on grade level science understanding.

== Athletics ==
Boys

- Baseball - AA
- Basketball - AAA
- Football - AA
- Golf - AA
- Soccer - A
- Tennis - AA
- Track and Field - AA
- Wrestling - AA

Girls

- Basketball - AA
- Golf - AA
- Soccer - A
- Softball - AA
- Tennis - AA
- Track and Field - AA

Total Girls varsity sports - 6

== See also ==
- List of high schools in Pennsylvania
- South Williamsport Area School District
