= Washington School District (Pennsylvania) =

School district in Washington County, Pennsylvania, U.S.

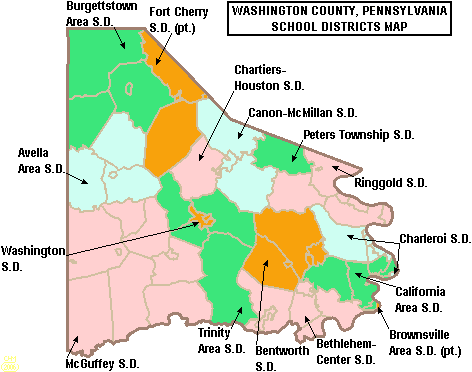

Address
- 331 Allison Avenue Washington, Pennsylvania, 15301; United States

District information
- Type: Public

Students and staff
- District mascot: Prexies

Other information
- Website: www.washington.k12.pa.us

The Washington School District is a small, urban, public school district in Washington County, Pennsylvania. It serves the city of Washington, Pennsylvania and the borough of East Washington, Pennsylvania. The district encompasses approximately nine square miles (23 km^{2}). According to 2000 local census data, it serves a resident population of 15,268. In 2009, the district residents' per capita income was $16,837, while the median family income was $37,613.

The district runs four schools: a primary school (K-3), an intermediary school (4–6), a middle school (7–8), and Washington High School (9–12).
