= Steelton-Highspire School District =

School district in Pennsylvania, U.S.

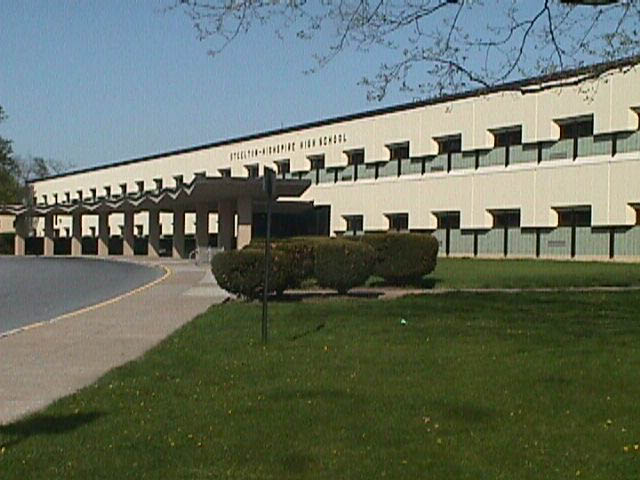
- Steelton-Highspire High School

Address
- 250 Reynders Street Steelton, Dauphin County, Pennsylvania, 17113; United States

District information
- Type: Public

Students and staff
- Colors: Blue, white, and grey

Other information
- Website: www.shsd.k12.pa.us

The Steelton-Highspire School District is a diminutive, suburban public school district located in Dauphin County, Pennsylvania. It encompasses the boroughs of Steelton and Highspire, both industrial suburbs of the City of Harrisburg. The district encompasses approximately 2 square miles (5.2 km^{2}) and is located on the eastern bank of the Susquehanna River. According to the 2020 United States census, it serves a resident population of 9,004. The educational attainment levels for the Steelton-Highspire School District population (25 years old and over) were 89% high school graduates and 11% college graduates.

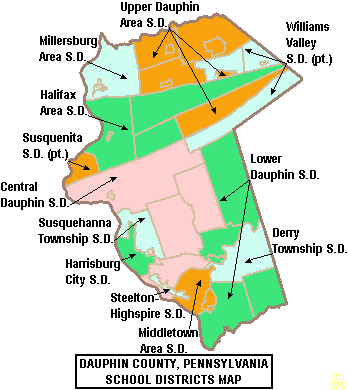
Location in Dauphin County, Pennsylvania

According to the Pennsylvania Budget and Policy Center, 74.8% of the district's pupils lived at 185% or below the Federal Poverty level as shown by their eligibility for the federal free or reduced price school meal programs in 2012. In 2009, Steelton-Highspire School District residents' per capita income was $17,304, while the median family income was $39,956. In the Commonwealth, the median family income was $49,501 and the United States median family income was $49,445, in 2010. In Dauphin County, the median household income was $52,371. By 2013, the median household income in the United States rose to $52,100.

The district operates Steelton-Highspire Elementary School, and one combined middle school, junior high school, and high school. Although the school district serves the boroughs of Steelton and Highspire, the Steelton-Highspire School District campus is geographically located in Swatara Township.

== Extracurriculars ==
The district offers a variety of clubs, activities and sports.

=== Sports ===
The district funds:

Boys

- Baseball - A
- Basketball - AAA
- Football - AA
- Track and field - AA

Girls

- Basketball - A
- Softball - A
- Track and field - AA
- Volleyball - A

Junior high school sports

Boys

- Basketball
- Football
- Track and field

Girls

- Basketball
- Track and field
- Volleyball

According to PIAA directory July 2015
