= Factoryville, Pennsylvania =

Borough in Pennsylvania, US

Factoryville
- Borough
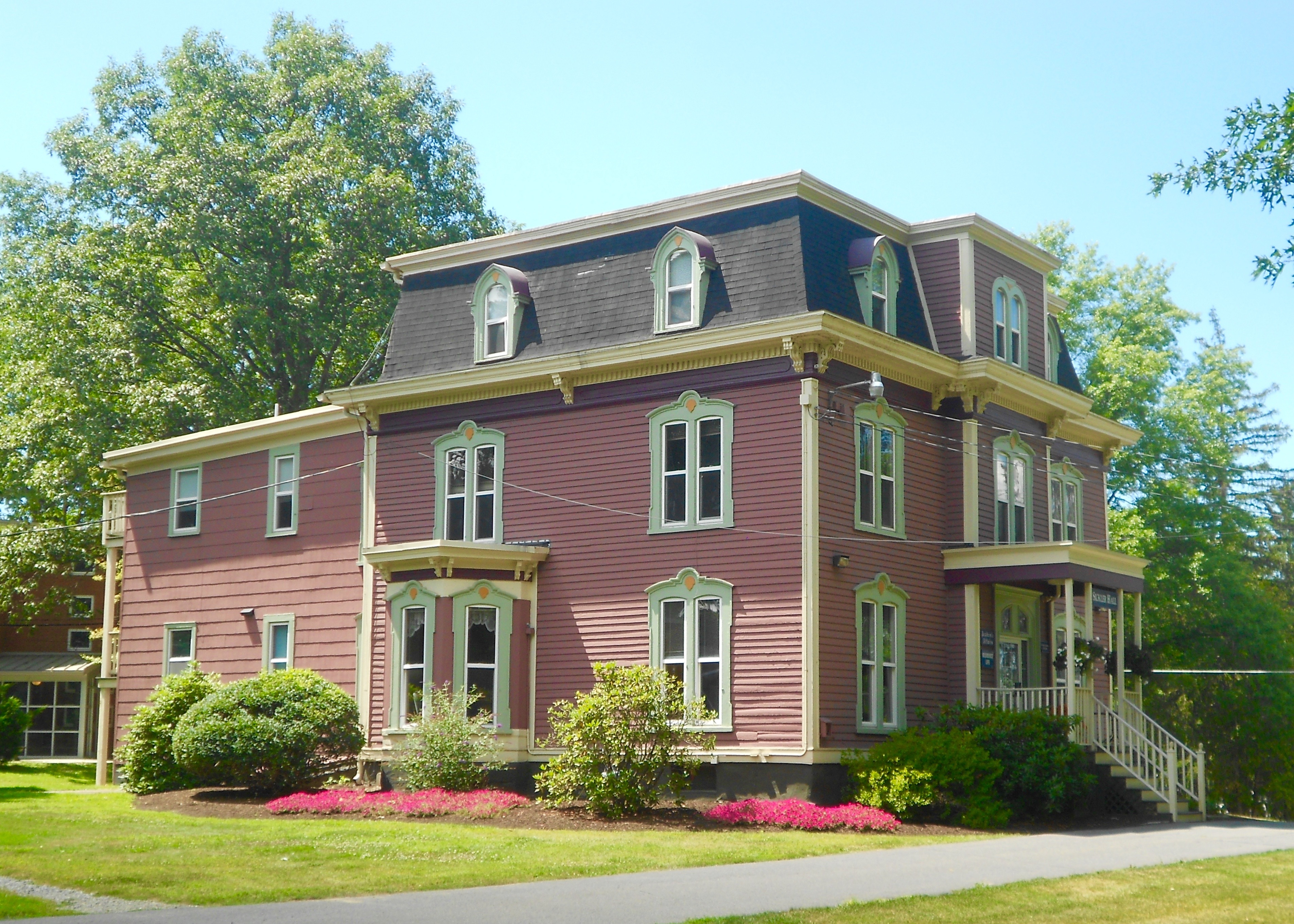
- Sickler Hall at Keystone College

- Location of Factoryville in Wyoming County, Pennsylvania

- Location of Factoryville in Pennsylvania Factoryville (the United States)
- Coordinates: 41°33′51″N 75°46′53″W
- Country: United States
- State: Pennsylvania
- County: Wyoming
- Founded: 1824

Government
  - Mayor: Lou Jasikoff

Area
  - Total: 0.76 sq mi (1.96 km^{2})
  - Land: 0.76 sq mi (1.96 km^{2})
  - Water: 0 sq mi (0.00 km^{2})
- Elevation: 955 ft (291 m)

Population (2020)
  - Total: 1,165
  - Density: 1,540.5/sq mi (594.79/km^{2})
- Time zone: UTC−5 (EST)
  - Summer (DST): UTC−4 (EDT)
- ZIP Code: 18419
- Area code: 570
- FIPS code: 42-24488
- Website: www.factoryville.org

Factoryville is a borough in Wyoming County, Pennsylvania, United States. The population was 1,146 at the 2020 census.

Factoryville was named for a woolen factory near the original town site.

== Geography ==
Factoryville is located at 41°33′51″N 75°46′53″W (41.564042, -75.781516).

According to the United States Census Bureau, the borough has a total area of 0.7 square miles (1.8 km^{2}), all land.

== Demographics ==
Historical population
Census	Pop.	Note	%±
1880	462		—
1890	577		24.9%
1900	659		14.2%
1910	759		15.2%
1920	628		−17.3%
1930	863		37.4%
1940	893		3.5%
1950	1,005		12.5%
1960	991		−1.4%
1970	922		−7.0%
1980	924		0.2%
1990	1,310		41.8%
2000	1,144		−12.7%
2010	1,158		1.2%
2020	1,165		0.6%
2021 (est.)	1,145	▼	−1.7%

As of the census of 2010, there were 1,158 people, 341 households, and 211 families residing in the borough. The population density was 1,654.3 inhabitants per square mile (638.7/km^{2}). There were 365 housing units at an average density of 521.4 per square mile (201.3/km^{2}). The racial makeup of the borough was 92.5% White, 4.6% African American, 0.1% Native American, 0.7% Asian, 0.7% from other races, and 1.5% from two or more races. Hispanic or Latino of any race were 4% of the population.

There were 341 households, out of which 24.3% had children under the age of 18 living with them, 43.1% were married couples living together, 15% had a female householder with no husband present, and 38.1% were non-families. 29.6% of all households were made up of individuals, and 12.3% had someone living alone who was 65 years of age or older. The average household size was 2.43 and the average family size was 3.06.

In the borough the age distribution of the population shows 15.6% under the age of 18, 75.2% from 18 to 64, and 9.2% who were 65 years of age or older. The median age was 23.6 years.

The median income for a household in Factoryville was $43,482, and the median income for a family was $63,929. Males had a median income of $37,344 versus $26,859 for females. The per capita income for the borough was $16,926. About 1.6% of families and 7.6% of the population were below the poverty line, including none of those under age 18 and 16.5% of those age 65 or over.

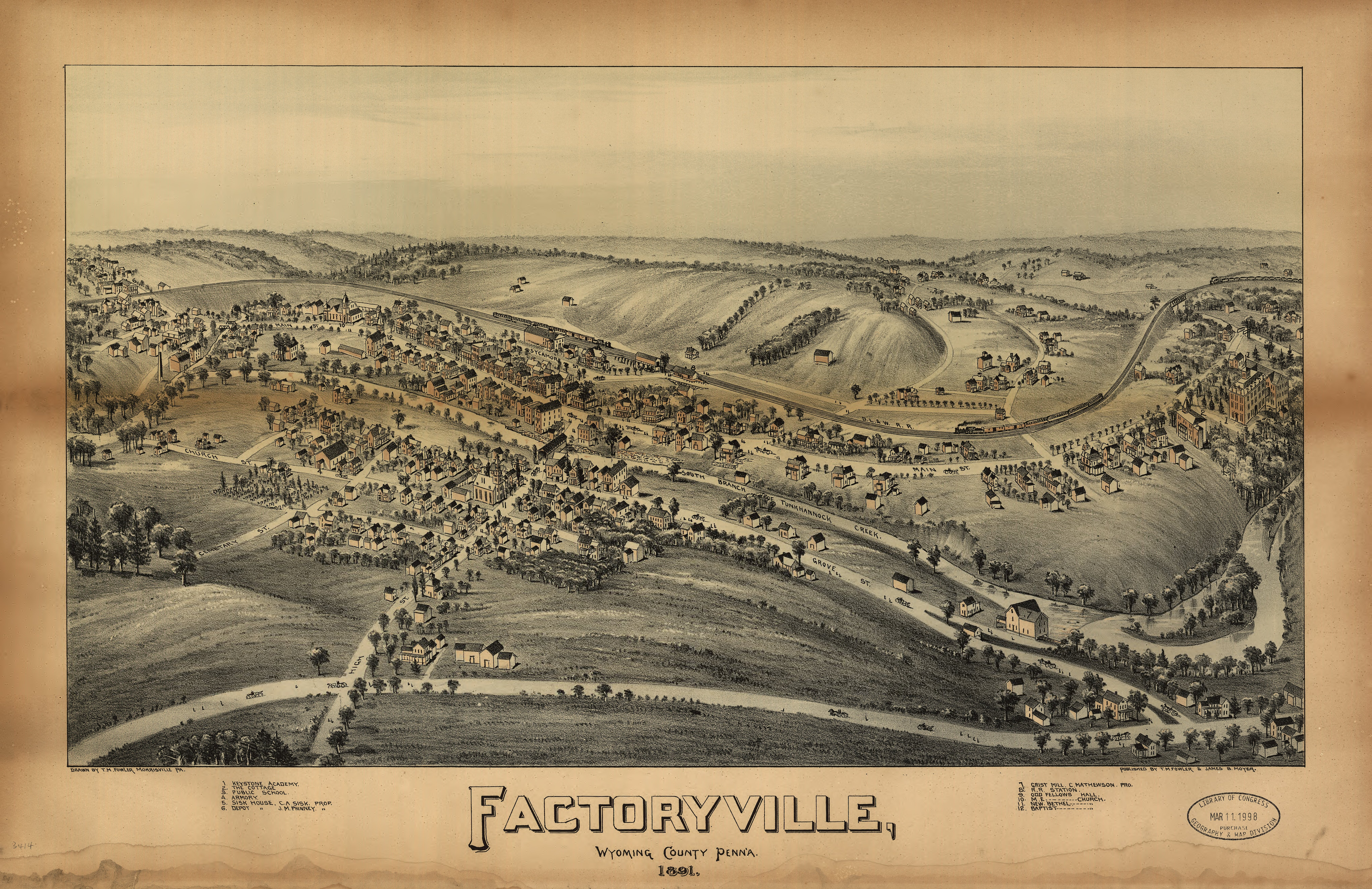
1891 bird's-eye view of Factoryville

== Government ==
Lou Jasikoff is the mayor of Factoryville.

=== Council ===
Council Member	Term Expires	Borough Ward
Colin Fricke		2
Bill Edwards		2
Gregg Yunko		1
Dan Engler		1
Elena O'Conner		2
Charles Truitt		1

== Transportation ==
Factoryville is served by Pennsylvania State Routes 6 and 11, the latter also is referred to as the Lackawanna Trail, and originally was the right-of-way of the Delaware, Lackawanna and Western Railroad, with a station in Factoryville. In 1915, the Clarks Summit-Hallstead Cut-Off was opened and the original line (now a highway) was abandoned, although a 1.2-mile spur line was built parallel to Route 107 to continue to serve businesses that had been served by the old mainline. That spur line was abandoned in 1940. The station on the new line was closed in 1953, and was torn down about 2010. Currently, the Cut-Off is served by Norfolk Southern.

== Christy Mathewson Day ==
The second Saturday in August every year is recognized as a holiday in Factoryville. Christy Mathewson Day celebrates the baseball Hall of Famer who was born in Factoryville on August 12, 1880. The festivities include a parade from Keystone College to Christy Mathewson Park, a 6 km-long (3.7 mi) foot race (in honor of Mathewson's nickname, "The Big 6"), a chicken barbecue, games and many other activities.

Christy Mathewson Day weekend and the town of Factoryville are the subjects of the documentary, "Christy Mathewson Day."
