= Farrell Area School District =

School district in Pennsylvania

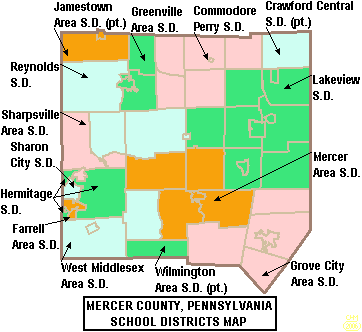

Address
- 1600 Roemer Boulevard Farrell, Mercer County, Pennsylvania, 16121; United States

District information
- Type: Public
- Grades: PreK-12
- Superintendent: Dr. Lora Adams-King
- NCES District ID: 4209690

Students and staff
- Students: 643 (2022-23)
- Teachers: 69.20 (FTE)
- Student–teacher ratio: 9.29

Other information
- Website: http://www.farrellareaschools.com/

Farrell Area High School

Location
- 1700 Roemer Boulevard; Farrell, (Mercer County), Pennsylvania 16121; United States; 41.212601°N 80.483764°W

Information
- Type: Public high school
- Principal: Dr. Emily Clare
- Staff: 22.80 (FTE)
- Enrollment: 275 (2023-24)
- Student to teacher ratio: 12.06
- Colors: Blue and gold
- Nickname: Steelers

The Farrell Area School District is a diminutive, rural, public school district serving parts of Mercer County, Pennsylvania. Farrell Area School District encompasses approximately 3 square miles (7.8 km^{2}) including: the communities of Farrell and Wheatland, both of which are adjacent to the much larger Sharon, Pennsylvania. According to 2000 federal census data, it serves a resident population of 6,798. By 2010, the district's population declined to 5,739 people. In 2009, Farrell Area School District residents' per capita income was $14,623, while the median family income was $29,821.

== Schools ==
- Farrell Area High School (7-12)
- Farrell Area Elementary School (PreK-6)

== Extracurriculars ==
Farrell Area School District offers a variety of clubs, activities and an extensive sports program.

=== Sports ===
The district funds:

Boys

- Basketball- A
- Football - A
- Swimming and Diving - A
- Track and Field - A
- Volleyball - AA

Girls

- Basketball - A
- Softball - A
- Swimming and Diving - AA
- Track and Field - AA
- Volleyball - A

Junior High School Sports

Boys

- Basketball
- Football
- Track and Field
- Volleyball

Girls

- Basketball
- Track and Field
- Volleyball

According to PIAA directory July 2013

The Farrell Steelers have won 21 PIAA State Championships (8 girls volleyball, 7 boys basketball, 3 wrestling, 2 football, 1 girls track). The Steelers have also won a PA record 7 PIAA State Championships in boys basketball (1952,1954,1956,1959,1960,1969 and 1972) as well as a WPIAL record 13 WPIAL boys basketball championships (1951,1952,1954,1956,1959,1960,1969,1971,1972,1974,1976,1984,1992). Former coach Ed McCluskey led the school to all 7 state titles and is widely considered to be one of the best basketball coaches ever. He coached numerous Division 1 and professional players. The girls volleyball program won 8 PIAA state championships in the 1980s, 1990s, and 2000s under Harriett Morrison.
