= List of people from New Castle, Pennsylvania =

The following are some notable people from New Castle, Pennsylvania, United States.

== Academia and education ==
- Joseph Baldwin, educator; "father of the normal school system"
- Ralph J. Cicerone, chancellor of the University of California, Irvine and president of the National Academy of Sciences
- Helen Thornton Geer, prominent librarian and academic
- Donald N. Levine, sociologist, professor and dean at the University of Chicago
- Herbert Robbins, mathematics professor at Columbia University and University of North Carolina at Chapel Hill

== Art ==
- Jack Cole, cartoonist and creator of the superhero Plastic Man
- Vivian Davidson Hewitt, art collector
- Elsie Lower Pomeroy, painter
- Thaddeus Mosley, sculptor

== Business ==
- Ralph F. Burns, executive secretary of Alpha Sigma Phi from 1936 to 1976
- Israel Gaither, National Commander of The Salvation Army in the United States, the first Back person to serve in that capacity
- Daniel Herman, founder of Hermes Press
- Thomas P. Johnson, minority owner of the Pittsburgh Pirates Major League Baseball franchise from 1946 through 1984
- George Zambelli, Sr., fireworks entertainer, and long-time president and manager of Zambelli Fireworks

== Entertainment ==
- Charles Joseph Carter, magician
- Spandan Daftary, sports television producer
- Gabbie Hanna, YouTuber and singer
- Donnie Iris, musician known for his work with the Jaggerz and Wild Cherry
- Scott Lawton, conductor
- David Marks, musician and founding member, Beach Boys
- Mike Marshall, musician
- Trent Reznor, lead singer, industrial rock band Nine Inch Nails
- Ira D. Sankey, gospel singer and composer
- Lew Simmons, minstrel and banjo player who performed in vaudeville, professional baseball manager
- Robert Sterling, film and television actor who starred in many films including the 1951 MGM hit Show Boat
- Phil Willmarth, magician

== Government ==
- John Kiriakou, former CIA operative who in 2007 was the first to admit that the agency used waterboarding as a form of interrogation

== Law ==
- James Wilfred McKinley, city attorney of Los Angeles and a judge of the Superior Courts of California
- Alexander L. Stevas, Clerk of the Supreme Court of the United States

== Literature ==
- Ron Androla, poet
- Edmond Hamilton, science fiction author
- Charles M. Kurtz, art critic, writer, and museum curator
- Gregory Wright, comic book editor, writer, and colorist

== Miltary ==
- William C. Chip, Major general in the United States Marines Corps
- Robert H. Shumaker, United States Navy rear admiral and Vietnam War prisoner of war

== Politics ==
- W. Thomas Andrews, Pennsylvania State Senate
- Marla Brown, Pennsylvania House of Representatives
- Jesse C. Dickey, United States House of Representatives and Pennsylvania House of Representatives
- Thomas Fee, Pennsylvania House of Representatives
- Louis E. Graham, United States House of Representatives
- William J. Hartnett, Ohio House of Representatives
- W. Godfrey Hunter, United States House of Representatives
- Francis Jackson, born free, he was kidnapped and sold into slavery; freed in 1855 with the resolution of Francis Jackson v. John W. Deshazer
- Oscar Lawrence Jackson, United States House of Representatives
- Thomas Wharton Phillips, United States House of Representatives
- Martha S. Pope, Secretary of the United States Senate and Sergeant at Arms of the United States Senate
- Ralph Pratt, Pennsylvania House of Representatives
- John Fletcher Ream, Iowa Senate
- Lucio F. Russo, New York State Assembly
- Christopher Sainato,Pennsylvania House of Representatives
- Raymond P. Shafer, Governor of Pennsylvania
- Frank Shields, Oregon State Senate
- John W. Slayton, Socialist Party of America propagandist and congressional candidate
- William R. Stewart, Ohio House of Representatives

== Religion ==
- Anthony G. Bosco, Catholic Bishop of Greensburg
- Scott M. Gibson, pastor, theologian, and educator
- Donald McKim, Presbyterian theologian, author, and editor

== Science and medicine ==
- John Blangero, human geneticist; highly cited scientist in the field of complex disease genetics
- Ernest A. Lachner, curator of fishes at the National Museum of Natural History
- Andrew R. Morgan, astronaut
- Dennis Slamon, oncologist and chief of the division of Hematology-Oncology at UCLA

== Sports ==
- Pete Allen, professional baseball player
- Herschel Baltimore, professional basketball player
- Charlie Bennett, professional baseball player
- Raymond Bernabei, professional soccer player and referee
- Chet Boak, professional baseball player
- Carl Boenish, father of modern BASE jumping
- Harold Burry, football coach and college athletics administrator
- Tom Brzoza, college football player
- George Chip, middleweight boxing champion of the world from 1913 to 1914
- Ben Ciccone, professional football player for the Pittsburgh Steelers
- Bruce Clark, professional football player with the New Orleans Saints and Kansas City Chiefs and Penn State All-American
- Paul Cuba, professional football player with the Philadelphia Eagles
- Chick Davies, college basketball coach
- Nick DeCarbo, professioanl football player with the Pittsburgh Pirates
- Matt DeSalvo, Major League Baseball starting pitcher with the Florida Marlins and formerly the New York Yankees and Atlanta Braves
- Darrell Dess, former football player for the Pittsburgh Steelers, the New York Giants, and the Washington Redskins
- Cleophus Hatcher, college football coach
- Malik Hooker, professional football player with the Indianapolis Colts
- Mark Mangino, former head coach of the University of Kansas football team
- Len Matarazzo, professional baseball player
- Scott McCurley, assistant football coach with the Green Bay Packers
- Bill McPeak, football player and National Football League coach
- Lawrence McPhee, college football player and coach
- Lance Nimmo, professional football player with Tampa Bay Buccaneers, New York Jets, Cleveland Browns, and New England Patriots
- Mary I. O'Connor, 1980 U.S. Olympic team rower and an orthopedic surgeon and professor with the Mayo Clinic and Yale School of Medicine; member of the 1976 Yale women's rowing team that started the Title IX movement to fight sexual discrimination in college athletics
- Larry Pugh, college football player
- Joe Quest, professional baseball player
- Nick Rapone, professional and college football coach
- Rick Razzano, professional football player
- Mike Roussos, professional football player with the Washington Redskins and the Detroit Lions
- Jack Rowan, professional baseball player
- Leslie Sansone, fitness instructor
- Paul Smith, professional baseball player
- Geno Stone, professional football player
- K.O. Sweeney, boxer
- Chuck Tanner, professional football player and manager of the Pittsburgh Pirates' 1979 World Series champion team
- David Young, professional basketball player
- Jack Zduriencik, Seattle Mariners general manager and former Pittsburgh Pirates
