= New Castle Junior/Senior High School =

Location
- 300 East Lincoln Ave. New Castle, Pennsylvania, 16101; United States
- 41.005°N 80.34°W

Information
- Type: Junior high school and High school
- School district: New Castle Area School District
- Superintendent: Gregg Paladina
- Senior high school principal: Kimberly Kladitis
- Junior high school principal: Kimberly Kladitis
- Faculty: 47.10 (FTE)
- Grades: 6–12
- Enrollment: 732 (grades 9-12) (2023-2024)
  - Grade 9: 232
  - Grade 10: 190
  - Grade 11: 158
  - Grade 12: 152
- Student to teacher ratio: 15.54
- Campus type: suburban
- Colors: Black and red
- Mascot: Hurricanes

New Castle Junior/Senior High School is a public school located in New Castle, Pennsylvania in Lawrence County. It is the only high school in the New Castle Area School District, which serves New Castle and Taylor Township. It was originally founded in 1879.

The school is a combined junior high school and senior high school, educating students in 6th through 12th grades. Its total student population is 1,524 as of the 2021-22 school year. It has a student-to-teacher ratio of 16.9 to 1.

== History ==
As a growing city, demands for a larger New Castle High School grew in the early 20th century. The former building, which was built in 1879, had become too small to house classes. Thus, in 1907 the New Castle School District purchased a plot of land along Lincoln Avenue in the city's lower North Hill neighborhood. The district selected local architecture firm W.G. Eckles (now Eckles Construction Services, Inc.) to design the building. Construction commenced in 1910 and the building opened on September 11, 1911.

Later, two additional buildings in other regions of town would be constructed to support the increasing population. Benjamin Franklin Junior High School on the city's east side opened on September 11, 1922. George Washington Junior High School on the city's North Hill (now George Washington Intermediate) opened on September 5, 1928.

The old New Castle High School was closed in 2003 and replaced with a new school, also designed by W.G. Eckles Architects. The first phase of construction of the $40 million building completed on a site next door to the former high school in 2004. The former building was then razed and replaced with what is now the junior high wing and field house of the new high school building, which opened in 2005. This resulted in the closure of Ben Franklin Junior High School, while George Washington was converted to an intermediate school housing grades 4, 5, and 6 in 1988. Eventually, 3rd grade would also be added at George Washington.

Beginning in 2019, the New Castle School District reallocated its 6th grade students to an unused wing of the Junior High School to reduce congestion at George Washington.

=== Demographics ===
In the 2021-22 school year, 1,524 students attended New Castle High School with an approximate full-time educational faculty of 89.7. This results in a student-to-teacher ratio of 16.9 to 1. The makeup of the school is 57.8% White, 24.6% Black, 12.2% from two or more races, 4.9% Hispanic or Latino of any race, 0.3% Native American, 0.1% Asian, and 0.1% Native Hawaiian or Pacific Islander.

100% of the 1,524 students qualify for free lunch under the National School Lunch Act of 1946. Additionally, it is a Title I School under the Elementary and Secondary Education Act of 1965.

== Faculty and staff ==
The senior high school principal is Kimberly Kladitis. She is also the junior high principal.

== Extracurricular activities ==
Students participate in many activities, including sports and forensics. Football and basketball are the two most popular sports, but other sports are offered including baseball, bowling, cross-country, golf, softball, track and field, volleyball, and wrestling and choir The school also offers a variety of STEM activities including VEX Competitive Robotics and has labs dedicated for STEM curriculum. New Castle High School has won team WPIAL championships in the following sports:

- Baseball (1 win; 2021)
- Boys' Basketball (14 wins; 1927, 1936, 1982, 1993, 1997, 1998, 1999, 2012, 2013, 2014, 2017, 2018, 2019, 2021)
- Girls' Basketball (4 wins; 2004, 2007, 2009, 2010.)
- Boys' Cross-Country (4 wins; 1947, 1948, 1954, 2019)
- Football (11 wins; 1924, 1932, 1933, 1934, 1942, 1948, 1949, 1967, 1973, 1975, 1998)
- Boys' Golf (1 win; 1995)

=== Football ===
Philip Henry Bridenbaugh and Lindy Lauro coached the football team for a combined 67 years, both with excellent winning records; in 1991 the school recorded its 600th football win, the first in Pennsylvania and the fifth in the US to achieve the milestone. The school's football field is officially named Lauro-Bridenbaugh Field at Taggart Stadium to honor both coaches. New Castle has 11 WPIAL championships in football, which is the third most in league history.

=== Basketball ===
Current basketball coach Ralph Blundo has been coaching since 2010 and has led the team to 7 WPIAL championships since then. His team won a PIAA state championship in 2014 after an undefeated season. In total, the New Castle Red Hurricanes boys' basketball team has won 14 championships, the most in WPIAL history.

New Castle's girls' basketball team has won 4 championships.

=== Other activities ===
New Castle's robotics team has sent teams to both state and world championships. Multiple teams have won awards at state championships and gone to the VEX Robotics Worlds Competition. Since inauguration in 2016, 7 individual teams have advanced to the world competition. One team, 16101Z, advanced in 2018 after winning the Western Pennsylvania Excellence Award at the state championship. Three teams, 16101X, 16101Y, and 16101Z, advanced in 2019 after winning the Excellence Award, Design Award, and Skills Champion Award, respectively. In 2020, two teams qualified, 16101E which won the Design Award, and 16101V which won both the Excellence Award and the Tournament Championship, but the world competition was canceled due to COVID-19.

== Notable people ==
- Philip Henry Bridenbaugh, mathematics teacher and coach
- Dick Cangey, stuntman and actor
- Ben Ciccone, football player, Pittsburgh Steelers, Chicago Cardinals
- William C. Chip, U.S. Marine Corps Major general and Quartermaster General
- Bruce Clark, football player
- Paul Cuba, football player, Philadelphia Eagles
- Nick DeCarbo, football player, Pittsburgh Pirates
- Malik Hooker, football player, Dallas Cowboys
- John Kiriakou, former CIA agent
- Mark Mangino, football coach, University of Kansas, Iowa State University
- Rick Razzano, football player, Cincinnati Bengals, Toronto Argonauts
- Geno Stone, football player, Houston Texans
- David Young, basketball player
