= Alpha Phi Delta =

American Italian college fraternity

- ΑΦΔ
- Founded: November 5, 1914; 111 years ago Syracuse University
- Type: Social
- Affiliation: Independent
- Former affiliation: NIC
- Status: Active
- Emphasis: Italian heritage
- Scope: National
- Motto: Faciamus!
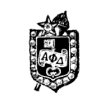
- Member badge
- Colors: Royal Purple and White
- Symbol: Fasces
- Flag
- Flower: Garofano (white carnation)
- Publication: The Kleos
- Chapters: 103 collegiate 60 alumni
- Members: 22,000+ active
- Headquarters: 257 East Camden Wyoming Avenue, Unit A Camden, Delaware 19934; United States
- Website: apd.org

Alpha Phi Delta (ΑΦΔ), commonly referred to as APD, is an American collegiate fraternity. Alpha Phi Delta was established at Syracuse University in 1914 as an Italian-heritage fraternity.

== History ==
In 1913, Syracuse University student Nicholas Frunzi had the idea to start a society for Italian students. He recruited six other students who formed an exclusive Italian society known as Il Circolo Italiano ("The Italian Circle") on November 5, 1913.

The seven members of Il Circolo Italiano met on October 14, 1914, to discuss becoming a Greek letter organization; they selected the name Alpha Phi Delta. On November 5, 1914, the seven founders met and swore an oath to Alpha Phi Delta, an Italian-heritage fraternity. The fraternity's founders were:

- Joseph Cangiamila
- Dominic T. Ciolli
- Ferdinand F. DiBartolo
- Anthony T. Frascati
- Nicholas Frunzi
- Otto Gelormini
- Cesidio A. Guarini

Frunzi was elected the fraternity's first president. During its first few weekly meetings, the fraternity's members adopted a constitution and ritual and also selected its banner, charter, coat of arms, handshake, motto, oath, pin, pledge, and whistle. DiBartolo was charged with approaching the university for official recognition, successfully making the case that Alpha Phi Delta's Italian members were prohibited from joining the existing campus fraternities.

When Frunzi transferred to Columbia University in 1916, he became friends with members of the local Italian heritage fraternity Sigma Gamma Phi. Frunzi convinced the founding members of Sigma Gamma Phi to merge with Alpha Phi Delta. Sigma Gamma Phi became the Beta chapter of Alpha Phi Delta, making the latter a national fraternity.

As time passed, Alpha Phi Delta chartered additional chapters. It began publishing its magazine, The Kleos of Alpha Phi Delta. Alpha Phi Delta became a member of the North-American Interfraternity Conference. On September 2, 1965, the fraternity began accepting members of all ethnic backgrounds.

In 2015, the fraternity reached 20,000 lifelong members. At the February 27, 2016, annual meeting in New Haven, Connecticut, the National Council of Alpha Phi Delta voted to leave the North-American Interfraternity Conference due to concerns over NIC's near-quadrupling of fees, its stripping of smaller fraternities from having voting privileges, and other grievances.

== Symbols ==
The Alpha Phi Delta motto is Faciamus! The fraternity's colors are royal purple and white. Its symbol is the Fasces. Its flower is the white carnation.

The Alpha Phi Delta badge is a shield with a black background bisected by a gold key. Across the shield and key is a white scroll and the letters ΑΦΔ. The shield is rimmed with gold and pearls, with a diamond star above its top and flaming torch at an angle behind the shield.

The fraternity's pledge pin is in the shape of a shield that is divided at an angle between the colors purple and white. Its publication is The Kleos.

== Chapters ==
Alpha Phi Delta has more than 100 chapters at various colleges across the United States.

== Notable members ==
| Name | Chapter and pledge | Notability | Ref. |
|---|---|---|---|
| Anthony Cafaro Sr. | Beta Omicron 1965 | President of Cafaro Company and real estate development | |
| Mario Cardullo | Delta 1953 | Technology engineer | |
| Ernie Casale | Beta Delta 1940 | Head baseball coach and athletic director at Temple University | |
| Ben Ciccone | Psi 1933 | Professional football player | |
| Albert W. Cretella | Gamma 1919 | United States House of Representatives | |
| Nick DeCarbo | Psi 1933 | Professional football player | |
| Al DeMao | Psi 1941 | Professional football player, Washington Redskins | |
| Joe DeNardo | Psi 1950 | Emmy Award-winning meteorologist | |
| Orlando DiGirolamo | Theta Beta 1950 | Jazz musician | |
| Phil DiStefano | Xi 1965 | Chancellor of the University of Colorado Boulder | |
| Aldo Donelli | Psi 1929 | Professional football player with the Pittsburgh Steelers and head football coach at Duquesne University | |
| Gaston L. Gianni Jr. | Beta Theta 1962 | Federal Deposit Insurance Corporation Inspector General | |
| Harvey Golub | Mu 1960 | CEO of American Express and CEO of the American International Group | |
| Ray Mancini | Omicron Epsilon (Honorary) 2009 | Two-time world boxing lightweight champion | |
| Armand Niccolai | Psi 1933 | Professional football player, Pittsburgh Steelers | |
| John A. Notte Jr. | Mu 1931 | Governor of Rhode Island | |
| Ralph Penza | Theta Beta 1951 | NBC news anchor | |
| Nicholas T. Pomaro | Beta Mu 1957 | Judge and advocate for the blind or visually impaired | |
| Joey Powers | | Composer and musician; had Top 10 1964 Hit "Midnight Mary" | |
| George Rado | Psi 1934 | Professional football player, Pittsburgh Steelers | |
| Dominic P. Renda | Xi 1933 | Founding president of Air Micronesia and chairman, chief executive, and operating officer of Western Airlines | |
| Mark Rodak | | Professional football player with the Pittsburgh Steelers and the Cleveland Rams, | |
| Martin Russo | Beta Mu 1962 | United States House of Representatives | |
| Henry Salvatori | Lambda 1921 | Geophysicist and founder of Western Geophysical | |
| Peter Sammartino | Eta 1924 | Founder of Fairleigh Dickinson University | |
| Alfred E. Santangelo | Eta 1928 | United States House of Representatives | |
| Robert V. Santangelo | Beta 1921 | New York State Supreme Court Justice | |
| Joseph Ralph Scalzo | Chi 1938 | Coach of the University of Toledo wrestling team, referee and coach for nine Olympic Games, president of the Amateur Athletic Union, inducted into the National Wrestling Hall of Fame | |
| Frank Sinatra | Beta Omicron (Honorary) 1967 | Singer and actor | |
| Vito J. Titone | Theta Beta 1949 | Associate Judge of the New York Court of Appeals | |
| Pete Van Wieren | Mu 1962 | Announcer for the Atlanta Braves | |
| Sal Vulcano | Gamma Sigma 1994 | Comedian and actor | |
| Silvio Zaninelli | Psi 1933 | Professional football player, Pittsburgh Steelers | |

== See also ==
- Cultural interest fraternities and sororities
- List of social fraternities
