= Pennsylvania House of Representatives, District 9 =

American legislative district

Pennsylvania's 9th State House of Representatives district
Representative
Marla Brown; R–New Castle
- Population (2022): 63,610

The 9th Pennsylvania House of Representatives District is in western Pennsylvania. As of 2023, it is represented by Marla Brown.

== District profile ==
The 9th Pennsylvania House of Representatives District is entirely located within Lawrence County. It includes the following areas:

- Bessemer
- Hickory Township
- Mahoning Township
- Neshannock Township
- New Castle
- New Wilmington
- North Beaver Township
- Pulaski Township
- Shenango Township
- S.N.P.J.
- South New Castle
- Taylor Township
- Union Township
- Wilmington Township

== Representatives ==
Representative	Party	Years	District home	Notes
Prior to 1969, seats were apportioned by county.
Thomas Fee	Democrat	1969 – 1994	New Castle	Retired
Chris Sainato	Democrat	1995 – 2023	New Castle	
Marla Brown	Republican	2023 – present	New Castle	Incumbent

== Recent election results ==
PA House election, 2024: Pennsylvania House, District 9
Party	Candidate	Votes	%
Republican	Marla Brown (incumbent)	Unopposed	
Total votes		26,860	100.00
Republican hold			

PA House election, 2022: Pennsylvania House, District 9
Party	Candidate	Votes	%
Republican	Marla Brown	13,721	52.90
Democratic	Chris Sainato (incumbent)	12,219	47.10
Total votes		25,940	100.00
Republican gain from Democratic			

PA House election, 2020: Pennsylvania House, District 9
Party	Candidate	Votes	%
Democratic	Chris Sainato (incumbent)	15,180	50.35
Republican	Carol Lynne Ryan	12,030	39.90
Independent	Darryl Audia	2,940	9.75
Total votes		30,150	100.00
Democratic hold			

PA House election, 2018: Pennsylvania House, District 9
Party	Candidate	Votes	%
Democratic	Chris Sainato (incumbent)	11,959	56.87
Republican	Gregory Michalek	9,068	43.13
Total votes		21,027	100.00
Democratic hold			

PA House election, 2016: Pennsylvania House, District 9
Party	Candidate	Votes	%
Democratic	Chris Sainato (incumbent)	Unopposed	
Total votes		24,848	100.00
Democratic hold			
