= List of Alpha Phi Delta chapters =

Alpha Phi Delta is an American collegiate fraternity that evolved from an exclusive Italian society established at Syracuse University in 1914. In the following list of chapters, active chapters are indicated in bold and inactive chapters are in italics.

Chapter	Charter date and range	Institution	Location	Status	Ref.
Alpha	November 5, 1914 – 1935; 1992–1997; 1999–2002;	Syracuse University	Syracuse, New York	Inactive	
Beta	June 1, 1916 – 1943	Columbia University	New York City, New York	Inactive	(Note: Chapter formed from Sigma Gamma Phi, established in 1915.)
Gamma	March 15, 1919 – 1943; 1992–1994	Yale University	New Haven, Connecticut	Inactive	
Delta	April 30, 1920 – 1944; 1945–1972; 1973–1980; 1999–2007	Polytechnic Institute of New York University	Brooklyn, New York	Inactive	
Epsilon	March 1, 1921 – 1967; 2025-	University at Buffalo	Buffalo, New York	Active	
Zeta	March 21, 1921 – 1940; 1949–1953; 1988–1991	Rensselaer Polytechnic Institute	Troy, New York	Inactive	
Eta	June 18, 1921 – 1968	City University of New York	New York City, New York	Inactive	
Theta	December 10, 1921 – 1943; 1947–1955	New York University, Washington Heights Campus	Washington Heights (Manhattan), New York	Inactive	(Note: NYU sold its Heights campus in 1973 due to the pressures of a financial crisis. The campus is now home to Bronx Community College, a unit of CUNY.)
Iota	December 11, 1921 – 1942	Union College	Schenectady, New York	Inactive	
Kappa	November 1, 1922 – 1943	Case Western Reserve University	Cleveland, Ohio	Inactive	
Lambda	November 4, 1922 – 1940; 1990–2000	University of Pennsylvania	Philadelphia, Pennsylvania	Inactive	
Mu	December 22, 1922 – 1967; 2012–2017	Cornell University	Ithaca, New York	Inactive	(Note: 1908 Chapter formed from the Arts & Science Club, established in 1908. After going dormant, it reformed as a colony in 2012.)
Nu	February 4, 1923 – 1936; 1942–1958	University of Pittsburgh	Pittsburgh, Pennsylvania	Inactive	(Note: Chapter formed from Lambda Lambda Mu (local), established in 1914. After going dormant, it reformed as a colony in 1940.)
Xi	April 8, 1923 – 1943; 1946–1968; 1981–1987	Ohio State University	Columbus, Ohio	Inactive	
Omicron	June 18, 1923 – 1934; 1948–1954; 1980–1986	University of Michigan	Ann Arbor, Michigan	Inactive	
**Pi**	December 22, 1923 – 1936; 1947–1982; 2021	West Virginia University	Morgantown, West Virginia	Active	
Rho	February 6, 1926 – 1943; 1947–1952	Carnegie Mellon University	Pittsburgh, Pennsylvania	Inactive	(Note: Chapter formed from Delta Gamma Delta (local), established in 1915. After going dormant, it reformed as a colony in 1946.)
Sigma	February 12, 1927 – 1943; 1946 –1955; 1959–1961; 1963–1971; 2000–2001	Boston University	Boston, Massachusetts	Inactive	(Note: Chapter formed from Lambda Sigma Delta, established in 1926. After going dormant, it reformed as a colony in 1959, 1963, and 1999.)
Tau	December 1, 1928 – 1937; 1939–1943; 1948–1953	Massachusetts Institute of Technology	Cambridge, Massachusetts	Inactive	(Note: Chapter formed from the Italian Club, established in 1928. After going dormant, it reformed as a colony in 1939 and 1947.)
Upsilon	December 1, 1928 – 1943; 1948–1953	Harvard University	Cambridge, Massachusetts	Inactive	
Phi	February 23, 1929 – 1939	University of Alabama	Tuscaloosa, Alabama	Inactive	(Note: Chapter formed from Phi Tau Omega (local), established in 1927.)
**Chi**	March 1, 1929 – 1986; 1990	Pennsylvania State University	University Park, Pennsylvania	Active	(Note: Chapter formed from Sigma Delta Chi (local) established in 1926. After going dormant, it reformed as a colony in 1990.)
**Psi**	March 17, 1929	Duquesne University	Pittsburgh, Pennsylvania	Active	(Note: Chapter formed from Delta Lambda Mu (local), established in 1927.)
Omega	March 19, 1929 – 1951	University of Rochester	Rochester, New York	Inactive	(Note: Chapter formed from Alpha Phi (local), established in 1925.)
**Beta Beta**	December 28, 1929 – 1943; 1945–1973; 1977– 2003, 2008t	Manhattan College	The Bronx, New York	Active	(Note: Chapter formed from Lambda Upsilon (local), established in 1928. After going dormant, it reformed as a colony in 1945, 1975, and 2007.)
Beta Gamma	February 21, 1930 – 1937	College of William & Mary	Williamsburg, Virginia	Inactive	(Note: Chapter formed from Alpha Lambda Upsilon (local), established in 1928.)
Beta Delta	March 21, 1930 – 1936; 1940–1980; 1982–1998	Temple University	Philadelphia, Pennsylvania	Inactive	(Note: Chapter formed from Iota Kappa Phi, established in 1927. After going dormant, it reformed as a colony in 1940 and 1982.)
**Theta Beta**	September 3, 1930 – 1943; 1945–1961; 1971–1998, 2012	New York University	New York City, New York	Active	
Beta Epsilon	November 22, 1930 – 1939	Bucknell University	Lewisburg, Pennsylvania	Inactive	(Note: Chapter formed from Delta Eta Chi (local), established in 1929.)
Beta Zeta	May 6, 1933 – 1943; 1946–1948	Ohio University	Athens, Ohio	Inactive	(Note: Chapter formed from Sigma Delta Phi (local), established in 1929. After going dormant, it reformed as a colony in 1946.)
Beta Eta	December 29, 1934 – 2022	Brooklyn College	Brooklyn, New York	Inactive	(Note: Chapter formed from Alpha Sigma Phi (local) established in the 1930s.)
Beta Theta	July 12, 1948 - 2022	Franciscan University of Steubenville	Steubenville, Ohio	Inactive	
**Beta Iota**	April 7, 1949 – 1995; 1996	Utica University	Utica, New York	Active	(Note: Chapter formed from the Alpha Club (local), established in 1948, at Utica College of Syracuse University. After going dormant, it reformed as a colony in 1996.)
Beta Kappa	May 9, 1949 – 1955; 1965–1967; 1998–2002	Long Island University	Brooklyn, New York	Inactive	
**Beta Lambda**	November 1, 1949 – 2004; 2009	Saint Francis University	Loretto, Pennsylvania	Active	
Beta Mu	October 18, 1950 – 1982; 2011–2015	DePaul University	Chicago, Illinois	Inactive	
Beta Nu	December 4, 1950 – 1954	University of Miami	Coral Gables, Florida	Inactive	(Note: Chapter formed from the Alpha Club (local), established in 1950.)
**Beta Xi**	March 29, 1952 – 2005; 2017	New Jersey Institute of Technology	Newark, New Jersey	Active	(Note: Chapter formed from Delta Sigma Zeta (local), established in 1930. After going dormant, it reformed as a colony in 2016.)
**Beta Omicron**	March 1, 1953 – 1996; 2002-	Youngstown State University	Youngstown, Ohio	Active	(Note: Chapter formed from the Alpha Phi Club (local), established in 1952. After going dormant, it reformed as a colony in 2002.)
Beta Pi'	June 5, 1959 – 1976; 1986 – 2019	St. John's University	Queens, New York	Inactive	
Beta Rho	November 8, 1959 – 2019	Gannon University	Erie, Pennsylvania	Inactive	
**Beta Sigma**	November 3, 1962	St. Francis College	Brooklyn, New York	Active	
Beta Tau	March 24, 1973 – 1978	Fairmont State University	Fairmont, West Virginia	Inactive	
Beta Upsilon	August 23, 1977 – 1981	George Washington University	Washington, D.C.	Inactive	
**Beta Phi**	August 22, 1978 – 2000; 2017	Rowan University	Glassboro, New Jersey	Active	
Beta Chi	August 22, 1978 – 1998	SUNY Polytechnic Institute	Utica, New York	Inactive	(Note: Chapter was chartered at the SUNY Institute of Technology which is now SUNY Polytechnic Institute.)
Beta Psi	August 21, 1979 – 1983; 2001–2004	Catholic University of America	Washington, D.C.	Inactive	
Beta Omega	August 21, 1979 – 1995; 2001–2002	Pace University	New York City, New York	Inactive	
Gamma Beta	August 21, 1979 – 1980	University of Illinois Chicago	Chicago, Illinois	Inactive	
Gamma Gamma	August 19, 1980 – 1982	Penn State Erie, The Behrend College	Erie, Pennsylvania	Inactive	
Gamma Delta	August 19, 1980 – 2003	Waynesburg University	Waynesburg, Pennsylvania	Inactive	
Gamma Epsilon	August 17, 1981 – 1986	Cleveland State University	Cleveland, Ohio	Inactive	
Gamma Zeta	August 16, 1982 – 2002	Villanova University	Villanova, Pennsylvania	Inactive	
Gamma Eta	August 24, 1984 – 2000	The College of New Jersey	Ewing Township, New Jersey	Inactive	(Note: Chapter was chartered at Trenton State College which became the College of New Jersey.)
Gamma Theta	August 20, 1985 – 1998	Eastern University	St. Davids, Pennsylvania	Inactive	
**Gamma Iota**	February 27, 1987	Pace University	Pleasantville, New York	Active	
Gamma Kappa	February 27, 1987 – 2022	College of Staten Island	Staten Island, New York	Inactive	
Gamma Lambda	February 27, 1987 – 1996	Fordham University, Lincoln Center Campus	Manhattan, New York	Inactive	
**Gamma Mu**	February 27, 1987	Stockton University	Galloway Township, New Jersey	Active	(Note: Chapter was chartered at the Richard Stockton College of New Jersey, which became Stockton University.)
Gamma Nu	August 22, 1987 – March 2018	William Paterson University	Wayne, New Jersey	Inactive	(Note: Chapter was permanently barred in March 2018.)
**Gamma Xi**	August 22, 1987 – 1996; 2009	Southern Connecticut State University	New Haven, Connecticut	Active	
Gamma Omicron	August 22, 1987 – 1998; 1999–2019	Stony Brook University	Stony Brook, New York	Inactive	
**Gamma Pi**	August 22, 1989	Ramapo College of New Jersey	Mahwah, New Jersey	Active	
Gamma Rho	August 22, 1989 – 2019	Baruch College (CUNY)	Manhattan, New York	Inactive	
Gamma Sigma	August 22, 1989 – 2001; 2002 – 2024	St. John's University, Staten Island Campus	Queens, New York	Inactive	
Gamma Tau	August 22, 1989 – 1993	Neumann College	Aston Township, Pennsylvania	Inactive	
Gamma Upsilon	February 16, 1990 – 1993; 2006–2007	Fordham University, Rose Hill Campus	Rose Hill, New York	Inactive	
Gamma Phi	August 20, 1990 – 1993; 2018–2021	New York Institute of Technology	Old Westbury, New York	Inactive	
Gamma Chi	February 16, 1991 – 1998	Delaware State University	Dover, Delaware	Inactive	
Gamma Psi	February 16, 1991 – 1994	University of Connecticut	Storrs, Connecticut	Inactive	
Gamma Omega	February 16, 1991 –1995	University of Georgia	Athens, Georgia	Inactive	
**Delta Beta**	August 29, 1991 – 1996, 2010	Rutgers University–New Brunswick	New Brunswick, New Jersey	Active	
Delta Gamma	August 29, 1991 – 1993	Philadelphia College of Textiles and Science	Philadelphia, Pennsylvania	Inactive	(Note: Chapter was chartered for Philadelphia College of Textiles and Science, which became Thomas Jefferson University in 2017.)
Delta Delta	August 29, 1991 – 1997; 2002–2021	Wesley College	Dover, Delaware	Inactive	(Note: After going dormant in 1997, the chapter was reestablished by absorbing Delta Chi Omicron (local). It went dormant in July 2021 when Wesley College closed.; Delaware State University acquired Wesley College, turning it into DSU Downtown.)
**Delta Epsilon**	February 14, 1992 – 2001; 2011	John Jay College of Criminal Justice	Manhattan, New York	Active	
Delta Zeta	February 14, 1992 – 2007	Saint Peter's University	Jersey City, New Jersey	Inactive	
Delta Eta	February 14, 1992 – 1999	Adelphi University	Garden City, New York	Inactive	
Delta Theta (First) (see **Delta Theta Second**)	February 14, 1992 – 2017	Marist College	Poughkeepsie, New York	Inactive, Reassigned	(Note: Chapter is no longer affiliated with Marist College and operates regionally as a multi-campus chapter.)
Delta Iota	August 22, 1992 – 2007	King's College	Wilkes-Barre, Pennsylvania	Inactive	
Delta Kappa	August 22, 1992 – 2007	State University of New York at Binghamton	Binghamton, New York	Inactive	
Delta Lambda	February 13, 1993 – 1997	New York Institute of Technology, New York City Campus	Manhattan, New York	Inactive	
Delta Mu	February 13, 1993 – 1995	University of South Florida	Tampa, Florida	Inactive	
Delta Nu	August 13, 1993 – 2004; 2009–2015	Eastern Connecticut State University	Willimantic, Connecticut	Inactive	
Delta Xi	August 18, 1993 – 2022	Seton Hall University	South Orange, New Jersey	Inactive	
Delta Omicron	February 14, 1994 – 1998; 2006–2021	Rutgers University–Newark	Newark, New Jersey	Inactive	
Delta Pi	February 14, 1994 – 2006	Embry–Riddle Aeronautical University	Daytona Beach, Florida	Inactive	
**Delta Rho**	August 20, 1996 – 2001; 2010	State University of New York at Oneonta	Oneonta, New York	Active	
Delta Sigma	August 5, 1997 – 2006	Tufts University	Medford, Massachusetts	Inactive	
Delta Tau	April 10, 1999 – 2000	Roger Williams University	Bristol, Rhode Island	Inactive	
Delta Upsilon	April 10, 1999 – 2000; 2012 - 2022	Robert Morris University	Moon Township, Pennsylvania	Inactive	
Delta Phi	April 6, 2002 – 2007	University of Indianapolis	Indianapolis, Indiana	Inactive	
**Delta Chi**	April 5, 2003	University of Colorado	Boulder, Colorado	Active	
**Delta Psi**	April 5, 2003	Lynn University	Boca Raton, Florida	Active	(Note: Chapter formed from Kappa Lambda Psi (local), established in 2002.)
Delta Omega	March 29, 2004 – 2005	University of Northern Colorado	Greeley, Colorado	Inactive	
**Epsilon Beta**	April 2, 2005	La Salle University	Philadelphia, Pennsylvania	Active	
**Epsilon Gamma**	February 16, 2013	St. Joseph's University, Patchogue Campus	Patchogue, New York	Active	(Note: Chapter formed from Delta Psi Omega (local), established in 1996.)
Epsilon Delta	February 21, 2014 – 2021	Montclair State University	Montclair, New Jersey	Inactive	
**Epsilon Epsilon**	February 28, 2015	Farmingdale State College (SUNY)	East Farmingdale, New York	Active	
**Epsilon Zeta**	August 25, 2016	St. Joseph's University, Brooklyn Campus	Brooklyn, New York	Active	
**Epsilon Eta**	February 27, 2016	State University of New York at Albany	Albany, New York	Active	
**Epsilon Theta**	February 27, 2016	Misericordia University	Dallas, Pennsylvania	Active	
**Epsilon Iota**	February 27, 2016	Centenary University	Hackettstown, New Jersey	Active	
Epsilon Kappa	February 27, 2016 – 2016	Dowling College	Oakdale, New York	Inactive	(Note: Chapter went dormant when Dowling College ceased operations on August 31, 2016.)
Epsilon Lambda	February 18, 2017 – 2024	University of New Haven	West Haven, Connecticut	Inactive	
**Delta Theta (Second)** (See Delta Theta First)	2017	Mid-Hudson Region	Mid-Hudson, New York	Active	(Note: The chapter was originally chartered at Marist College in 1992. However, it disaffiliated with Marist in 2017, becoming a multi-campus regional chapter.)
Epsilon Mu	February 24, 2018 – 2020	Queens College, CUNY	Flushing (Queens), New York	Inactive	
**Epsilon Nu**	February 24, 2018	Penn State Altoona	Logan Township, Pennsylvania	Active	
**Epsilon Xi**	February 24, 2018	Vaughn College of Aeronautics and Technology	East Elmhurst (Queens), New York	Active	
**Epsilon Omicron**	February 29, 2020	Fitchburg State University	Fitchburg, Massachusetts	Active	
**Epsilon Pi**	February 29, 2020	State University of New York at Cortland	Cortland, New York	Active	
**Epsilon Rho**	September 19, 2021	Kipps Bay Region	Kipps Bay, Manhattan, New York	Active	
**Epsilon Sigma**	March 5, 2022	State University of New York at New Paltz	New Paltz, New York	Active	
**Epsilon Tau**	February 22, 2025	University of Delaware	Newark, Delaware	Active	
