= Philip Henry Bridenbaugh =

American football coach (1890–1990)

- Bridenbaugh in 1912

Biographical details
- Born: May 1, 1890; Martinsburg, Pennsylvania, U.S.
- Died: June 14, 1990 (aged 100); New Castle, Pennsylvania, U.S.

Playing career

Football
- 1908–1911: Franklin & Marshall
- Position: Quarterback

Coaching career (HC unless noted)

Football
- 1912: Oberlin (assistant)
- 1913–1914: The Kiski School
- 1915–1916: Beaver Falls HS (PA)
- 1917–1921: Geneva
- 1922–?: New Castle HS (PA)
- ?–1964: Grove City (assistant)

Basketball
- 1917–1922: Geneva

Head coaching record
- Overall: 23–12–5 (college football); 48–42 (basketball)

Philip Henry Bridenbaugh (May 1, 1890 – June 14, 1990) was an American football player and coach. A graduate of Franklin & Marshall College, where he earned a degree in teaching and spent four years on several of its sports teams, Bridenbaugh coached football at several places in his home state of Pennsylvania prior to being selected as the head coach of the Geneva College Golden Tornadoes in 1917. He left Geneva in 1922 with a 23–12–5 record and took a job with New Castle Junior/Senior High School as a mathematics teacher and head football, basketball, and track and field coach. He did not lose a football game in his first two years, marking the first of eleven undefeated seasons, and, over the course of 33 years, won seven league titles in the sport, leaving in 1955 with a 265–65–25 record. He continued to work as an assistant football coach at Grove City College until 1964 and was inducted into several regional halls of fame. He died in June 1990 at the age of 100.

== Early life ==
Bridenbaugh was born on May 1, 1890, in Martinsburg, Pennsylvania, one of 14 children of Professor Phillip Howard Bridenbaugh, an educator and academic administrator, and Catherine Oelling. He attended Altoona Area High School in Altoona, Pennsylvania, for one year, and then enrolled in a university-preparatory school, prior to entering Franklin & Marshall College in Lancaster, Pennsylvania, in 1908. At Franklin & Marshall he competed in track and field, football, basketball, and baseball while earning a teaching degree, despite the fact that "football was considered out of bounds in the Bridenbaugh family". In football, he played in the position of quarterback and was team captain during his senior year. During his first season, the team went 4–6–1, but it improved to a winning record of 9–1 the following year, with its sole loss being against Carnegie Mellon University. In his final two years at the institution, the squad went 4–3–2 and 3–6. He graduated in 1912 and married Belva Rebecca Crissman, a teacher in Martinsburg, on June 8, 1916. They had three children: Betty, J. Ross, and Audrey.

== Coaching career ==
Bridenbaugh's first assistant coaching job was with the Oberlin Yeomen of Oberlin College under head coach T. Nelson Metcalf. He then spent two seasons at The Kiski School in Saltsburg, Pennsylvania, and another two at Beaver Falls High School. In 1917 he became the ninth head coach of Geneva College's Golden Tornadoes in Beaver Falls. His record in this first season was 5–3–1, although the team allowed as many points as they scored (114). He went 4–2 in 1918, outscoring the opposition 67–36, and 4–2–2 in 1919, despite a negative point differential of 51–59 caused by a 2–33 loss to the University of Pittsburgh. In 1920 his record was 5–2–1, outscoring other institutions 125–61 despite a 0–47 loss to Pittsburgh. He was 5–3–1 in his final season, with a positive point differential of 106–49; half of their points scored during this year came in a 54–0 victory over Juniata College. Following his resignation, he was replaced by Robert Park, who was head of the history department, for the 1922 season, and then Tom Davies in 1923.

During this time he also coached the school's basketball team. In his first season, 1917–18, he went 13–2, outscoring his opponents 524–303 and losing against only Allegheny College and Westminster College. He maintained a winning record for the next two seasons, going 10–7 for the 1918–1919 season and 10–9 in 1919–1920. In the latter case, the Golden Tornadoes managed a positive point margin of 599–581. Bridenbaugh went 7–14 for the 1920–1921 season, being outscored 584–631, and 8–10 in his final year, with a 546–589 point record.

In 1922 Bridenbaugh was hired by New Castle Junior/Senior High School as a mathematics teacher and as their head football coach. He was undefeated in his first two seasons with New Castle, posting an 8–0–1 record in 1922, with a point differential of 229–54, and finishing 10–0–1 in 1923. He continued his undefeated streak for another 13 games in 1924, before being bested 0–14 by a team from Ellwood City that went on to have a perfect season. He coached at New Castle for 33 years, earning the nickname "The Fox", and left in 1955 with a record of 265–65–25, which included 11 undefeated seasons, seven one-loss seasons, and seven Western Pennsylvania Interscholastic Athletic League (WPIAL) championships (1924, 1932–34, 1942, 1948–49); at the time of his death, this was believed to be the best record in Pennsylvanian high school football history and the fourth-best in the United States. He also coached basketball at New Castle, leaving with a 319–159 record and two victories at the WPIAL championships in 1927 and 1936, and ran the track and field program. He ended his career by serving as an assistant coach at Grove City College in Grove City, Pennsylvania, until 1964.

== Later life ==
Bridenbaugh's wife died on March 19, 1982. A plaque listing his accomplishments was hung at the school in 1971 and he was inducted into the Western Chapter of the Pennsylvania Sports Hall of Fame in 1972, the Lawrence County Historical Society Sports Hall of Fame in 1984, the Pennsylvania High School Football Coaches Hall of Fame in 1989, and the Franklin & Marshall College Athletics Hall of Fame in 1994. He died on June 14, 1990, of heart disease, at the Indian Creek Nursing Center in New Castle, Pennsylvania, at the age of 100. The field at New Castle is named jointly in honor of Bridenbaugh and Lindy Lauro, a player under Bridenbaugh who later coached New Castle to a 220–104–15 record, making it the only high school in the nation with two coaches who earned 200 or more victories.

== Head coaching record ==
=== College football ===
Year	Team	Overall	Conference	Standing	Bowl/playoffs
Geneva Covenanters (Independent) (1917–1921)
1917	Geneva	5–3–1			
1918	Geneva	4–2			
1919	Geneva	4–2–2			
1920	Geneva	5–2–1			
1921	Geneva	5–3–1			
Geneva:		23–12–5			
Total:		23–12–5			

=== College basketball ===
Record table
Season	Team	Overall	Conference	Standing	Postseason
Geneva Covenanters (Independent) (1917–1921)
1917–18	Geneva	13–2			
1918–19	Geneva	10–7			
1919–20	Geneva	10–9			
1920–21	Geneva	7–14			
1921–22	Geneva	8–10			
Geneva:		48–42			
Total:		48–42			
