= New Castle Area School District =

School district in Pennsylvania

Coordinates: 41.007°N 80.322°W

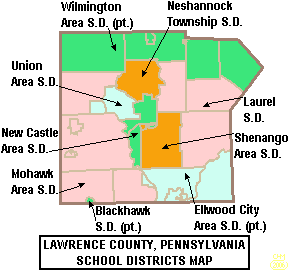

Address
- 420 Fern Street New Castle, Pennsylvania, 16101-2596; United States

District information
- Grades: Pre-K–12
- Superintendent: Gregg Paladina
- School board: Pat Amabile III, Paul Fulena, George Gabriel, Karen Humphrey, Robert Lyles, Terry Masters, Mark Panella, Anna Pascarella, Gary Schooley
- Chair of the board: Mark Panella
- Schools: 4
- Budget: $62,678,323 (2024-25)

Students and staff
- Enrollment: 2,920 (2024-25)
- Teachers: 186.5
- Student–teacher ratio: 1:15.7
- Colors: Black & Red

Other information
- Website: www.ncasd.com

New Castle Area School District is a public school district located in Lawrence County, Pennsylvania. The district serves the city of New Castle and Taylor Township. New Castle Area School District encompasses approximately 14 square miles (36 km^{2}). According to 2024 Census Estimates, the district served 21,332 residents, and had 2,920 students enrolled in the 2024-25 academic year.

New Castle Area School District operates four schools: Croton Pre-Kindergarten, Harry W. Lockley Early Learning Center, George Washington Intermediate School, and New Castle Junior/Senior High School.

== Schools ==
=== New Castle Junior-Senior High School ===
New Castle Junior-Senior High School is located at 300 East Lincoln Avenue. The school first opened in 2004 to Senior High students and opened to Junior High students a year later at a total construction cost of $40,300,000. As of the 2024–25 school year, 740 students were housed in the Senior High wing and 689 students were housed in the Junior High wing for a total of 1,429 pupils. The Junior High consists of grades 6-8, while the Senior High holds grades 9-12. As of 2025, the principal is Mrs. Kimberly Kladitis. Assistant principals for the Senior High are Mr. Ralph Blundo and Mrs. April Siciliano. For the Junior High, Mr. Sam Giordano, Mr. Jonathan Lucas, and Mrs. Nikki Jo Pierce are assistant principals.

=== George Washington Intermediate School ===
George Washington Intermediate is located at 101 East Euclid Avenue. It first opened in 1928, and since has had many major renovations to modernize the building. The school houses grades 3-5 and had 707 students enrolled in the 2024-25 academic year. As of 2025, the building's principal is Mr. David Antuono and it's assistant principal is Mr. Pat Cain.

=== Harry W. Lockley Early Learning Center ===
Harry W. Lockley Early Learning Center is located at 900 East Main Street, New Castle, is the newest building in the New Castle Area School District. Completed in 2013 after an expansion and modernization to a former building, and was constructed at a cost of $19,031,300. The school houses grades Kindergarten through second grade. In the 2024-25 school year, 736 pupils were enrolled at this school. The building's principal is Mr. Joe Anderson and it's assistant principals are Mrs. Kelly Corey and Mrs. Cara Florie.

=== Croton Pre-Kindergarten Center ===
Croton Pre-Kindergarten Center is located at 420 Fern Street, the same address as the District Administration office.

== Former Schools ==
A list of the former schools of the New Castle Area School District. Two schools, Mahoning and West Pittsburg, were annexed from defunct school districts.

School	Location	Opened	Closed	Notes
Arthur McGill School	1701 Albert Street	1922	1988	Now the New Castle Christian Academy.
Ben Franklin Junior High School	601 East Lutton Street	1922	2005	Now Ben Franklin Early Learning Center, operated by LCCAP.
Croton School	420 Fern Street	1901	1963	Demolished in 1964. Replaced by what is now Croton Pre-Kindergarten Center.
Harry W. Lockley Elementary School	900 East Main Street	1955	2011	Partially demolished and replaced by Harry W. Lockley Early Learning Center.
Highland Avenue School	717 Highland Avenue	1896	1963	Demolished in 1965 after the construction of John F. Kennedy School nearby.
Garfield School	300 East Reynolds Street	1891	1954	Demolished to make way for the Lincoln-Garfield Elementary School
John F. Kennedy Elementary School	326 Laurel Boulevard	1963	2014	Building sold and now houses a church.
Lawrence School	1101 North Liberty Street	1901	1932	Demolished in 1971. Replaced by a warehouse.
Lincoln School	301 East Long Avenue	1880	1953	Demolished to make way for the Lincoln-Garfield Elementary School
Lincoln-Garfield Elementary School	301 East Long Avenue	1954	1988	Demolished in 2024. To be replaced by an apartment building.
Mahoning Elementary School	210 North Cedar Street	1916	1988	Demolished in 1994. Replaced by a senior apartment complex.
Mahoning School	210 North Cedar Street	1893	1915	Annexed from the Mahoningtown School District. Destroyed by a fire in 1915.
Mulleintown School	708 West Washington Street	1893	1960	Demolished in 1960 after the completion of the West Side School.
New Castle High School	300 East Lincoln Avenue	1911	2003	Demolished in 2004 to make way for the Junior High wing of the New Castle Junior-Senior High School.
North Street Elementary School	303 East North Street	1953	1974	Building sold and now houses the New Castle Police Department.
North Street School	303 East North Street	1879	1952	Demolished in 1952 after a fire; North Street Elementary School built on site.
Oak Street School	810 Oak Street	1894	1955	Demolished in 1971; lot vacant.
Rose Avenue School	920 Rose Avenue	1924	1988	Demolished in 1973. Replaced by single-family houses.
Terrace Avenue School	1 West Terrace Avenue	1900	1941	Demolished in 2010; lot vacant.
Thaddeus Stevens Elementary School	831 Harrison Street	1963	2014	Building sold and now houses a disability center.
Thaddeus Stevens School	1028 East Washington Street	1898	1963	Demolished in 1963 after the completion of Thaddeus Stevens Elementary.
Pollock Avenue School	813 Pollock Avenue	1905	1968	Demolished in 1970; lot vacant.
Union School / Martin Gantz School	10 West Grant Street	1852	1928	Demolished in 1933. Replaced by an office building.
West Pittsburg School	153 Center Avenue	1959	1988	Annexed from the Taylor Township School District in 1962. Building sold.
West Side School	708 West Washington Street	1960	2014	Building sold and now houses a mental health center.
W. N. Aiken School	203 Pearson Street	1858	1939	Destroyed by a fire in 1994; lot vacant.

== Sports offered ==
New Castle Area School District offers an extensive sports program.

The District funds:

Boys:

- Baseball - AAAA
- Basketball- AAAA
- Cross country - AAA
- Football - AAA
- Golf - AAA
- Track and field - AAA
- Wrestling - AAA

Girls:

- Basketball - AAA
- Cross country - AA
- Softball - AAA
- Track and field - AAA
- Volleyball - AA

Junior High School Sports

Boys:

- Baseball
- Basketball
- Cross country
- Football
- Track and field

Girls:

- Basketball
- Cross country
- Softball
- Track and field
- Volleyball

The district also participates in bocce programs through the Special Olympics and Girls Flag Football through the Pittsburgh Steelers.
