= Sewickley Academy =

Coordinates: 40.54389°N 80.19083°W

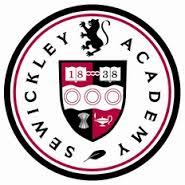
- 315 Academy Avenue; Sewickley, PA 15143

Information
- Type: Independent college-preparatory school
- Motto: Latin: Amici, Honor, et Virtus (Friendship, Honor, and Achievement)
- Religious affiliation: Nonsectarian
- Established: 1838; 188 years ago
- Founders: William Nevin & John Champ
- Status: Open
- CEEB code: 394475
- NCES School ID: 01197901
- Head of school: Ashley Birtwell
- Faculty: 85.8 (on an FTE basis)
- Grades: PK–12
- Gender: Coeducational
- Enrollment: 533 (2021–2022)
  - Pre-kindergarten: 18
  - Kindergarten: 22
  - Grade 1: 28
  - Grade 2: 29
  - Grade 3: 24
  - Grade 4: 34
  - Grade 5: 31
  - Grade 6: 33
  - Grade 7: 46
  - Grade 8: 43
  - Grade 9: 54
  - Grade 10: 44
  - Grade 11: 64
  - Grade 12: 63
- Student to teacher ratio: 1:6.0
- Hours in school day: 7
- Campus size: 17 acres (6.9 ha)
- Campus type: Suburban
- Colors: Red; Black
- Athletics conference: PIAA, WPIAL
- Nickname: Panthers
- Accreditation: NAIS
- Endowment: $35.53 million
- Tuition: $18,995 PK $20,655 K $25,760 1-5 $29,980 6-8 $32,035 9-12
- Revenue: $21.37 million
- Website: sewickley.org
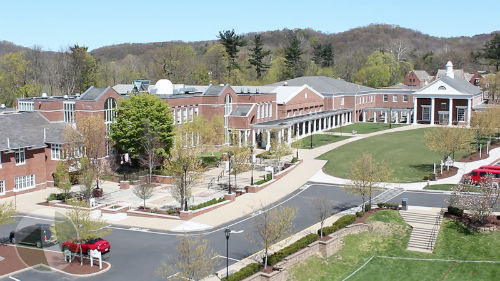

Sewickley Academy is a private, independent, coeducational, college-preparatory academy located in Sewickley, Pennsylvania, United States. The Academy educates 594 students, from pre-kindergarten to twelfth grade. It is a member of the National Association of Independent Schools.

== History ==
Founded in 1838 as a boys' school by William Nevin and John Champ, Sewickley Academy is the oldest independent school in western Pennsylvania. It was first located in a house owned by Squire John Way, a brick building still on Beaver Road in Sewickley. Boarding students came from several southern states, including Virginia and a few from as far south as New Orleans, Louisiana, arriving by steamboat and railway to study with local day students from the Pittsburgh area.

During its early history, the school went through several iterations, moving four times around the Sewickley area and even briefly closing three times (once during the Civil War, when southern students returned home and several of the remaining older boys and teachers joined the war effort). In 1865, the school reopened as a day school. Two local girls' primary schools closed in the early 1900s. After integrating these girls into its academic program, the Academy became a coeducational day school when it settled onto its present campus in 1925.

Under the leadership of Headmaster Cliff Nichols (1951 – 1981), the Academy expanded slowly from a neighborhood school into a more regional institution. For much of its history, the Academy had only educated students through Grade 9. At that point, they left to attend and complete their secondary education at other boarding and day schools in the Pittsburgh area. However, in 1963, Mr. Nichols hired James E. Cavalier. He delegated him to program and build a Senior School (one class year at a time). The first class graduated from this new Senior School in 1966.

Only four years later, on 10 January 1970, a fire destroyed the main building of the Middle School. Soon after this sad event, Nichols and the Board of Trustees initiated a capital campaign to fund significant repairs and expansion of the main building and to add several new buildings. Later, the Academy commissioned a comprehensive Campus Master Plan (1998 - 2000) that further transformed its education facilities, adding an entirely new classroom building for the Middle School and a central library for the Middle and Senior Schools, reconfiguring and reintegrating many other buildings on campus.

In 2013, the school celebrated the 175th anniversary of its 1838 founding and the 50th anniversary of the inception of its Senior School.

In 2021, in response to parent complaints about DEI initiatives, the school fired many black administrators and faculty, along with its head of school, Kolia O'Connor. The school subsequently settled a federal racial discrimination lawsuit.

== Extracurricular activities ==
=== Cum Laude Society ===
Sewickley Academy has been a member of the Cum Laude Society since 1966. Faculty members of the Sewickley Academy Cum Laude Society select students from the senior class as candidates for induction into the Sewickley Academy chapter of the Cum Laude Society. These selections are made based on the student's academic achievement record through the end of their junior year. When evaluating candidates for induction, the Cum Laude Society instructs its member chapters not to consider service, athletics, leadership, or other non-academic factors, arguing that such qualities are recognized in many other contexts. Therefore, the Cum Laude Society recommendation focuses first and foremost on a student's record of academic achievement.

=== Athletics ===
The Sewickley Academy Athletics Program fosters personal and team excellence among student-athletes. Outstanding coaches work with individuals and teams to improve performance and promote character, leadership, and sportsmanship. Over 85 percent of the student body at middle and senior schools participates in at least one athletic team each year, and many students play multiple sports.

The Academy has a no-cut policy, allowing any student to play on any team of their choosing. The campus has four athletic fields, including a turf field for softball, five tennis courts, two gymnasiums, and a fitness center that supports 22 varsity teams.

Fall

- Boys cross country
- Girls cross country
- Field hockey
- Boys soccer
- Girls soccer
- Girls tennis
- Golf

Winter

- Boys basketball
- Girls basketball
- Boys ice hockey
- Girls ice hockey
- Boys swimming
- Boys diving
- Girls swimming
- Girls diving
- Track

Spring

- Baseball
- Boys lacrosse
- Girls lacrosse
- Softball
- Boys tennis
- Track

Since 1986, the Academy has been a member of the Western Pennsylvania Interscholastic Athletic League (WPIAL) and competes in District 7 of the Pennsylvania Interscholastic Athletic Association (PIAA). The Academy's ice hockey team is a member of the PIHL and the Midwest Prep Hockey League. The Academy has been crowned the MSA Sports Cup Champion for nine of the past 11 years.

== Campus ==
Sewickley Academy is located approximately 12 miles northwest of Pittsburgh on a single 16-acre campus that includes 60 classrooms, 9 science labs, 5 computer labs, 2 robotics labs, 2 libraries (with a total of 33,600 volumes), 2 student publishing centers, a digital design lab, and a media center.

The campus also has five tennis courts, four athletic fields (including a turf field), two gymnasiums, and a fully-equipped fitness center that supports 22 varsity sports teams.

The school supports student art programs with visual and performing art studios, a ceramics studio, music practice rooms, a black-box theater with seating for approximately 130, Rea Auditorium with 570 seats, and the Campbell Art Gallery. The Academy utilizes two greenhouses and a school garden to create an outdoor classroom and experiential learning center.

Early Childhood, Lower, Middle, and Senior Schools: 315 Academy Avenue, Sewickley, PA 15143

Frick Field: 200 Hazel Lane, Sewickley, PA 15143

Nichols Field: 624 Beaver Road, Sewickley, PA 15143

== Notable alumni ==
- Caitlin Clarke (1970) - Stage & screen actress
- Rusty Cundieff (1978) - Film and television director, actor, and writer
- Spandan Daftary (1981) - Sports television producer
- Mike Fincke (1985) - Astronaut
- Valerie Gaydos (1984) - Pennsylvania House of Representatives
- Trevor Long (1988) - actor
- Brian Hutchison (1989) - Tony award-winning actor
- Rafe Judkins (2001) - Survivor: Guatemala contestant
- John Latta - 1st Lieutenant Governor of Pennsylvania
- John Michael - Broadcaster for the Cleveland Cavaliers
- Gregory Nicotero (1981)
- James G. Webster (1969) - Professor at Northwestern University

== Gallery ==
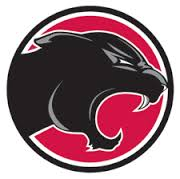

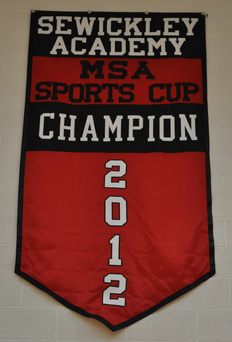

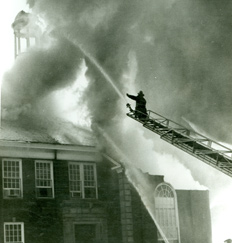

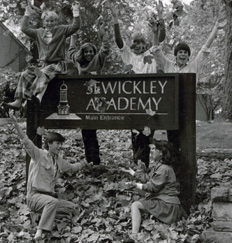

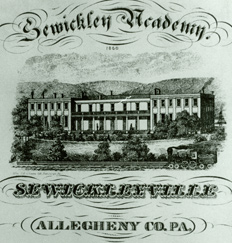
