= Chris Sainato =

American politician

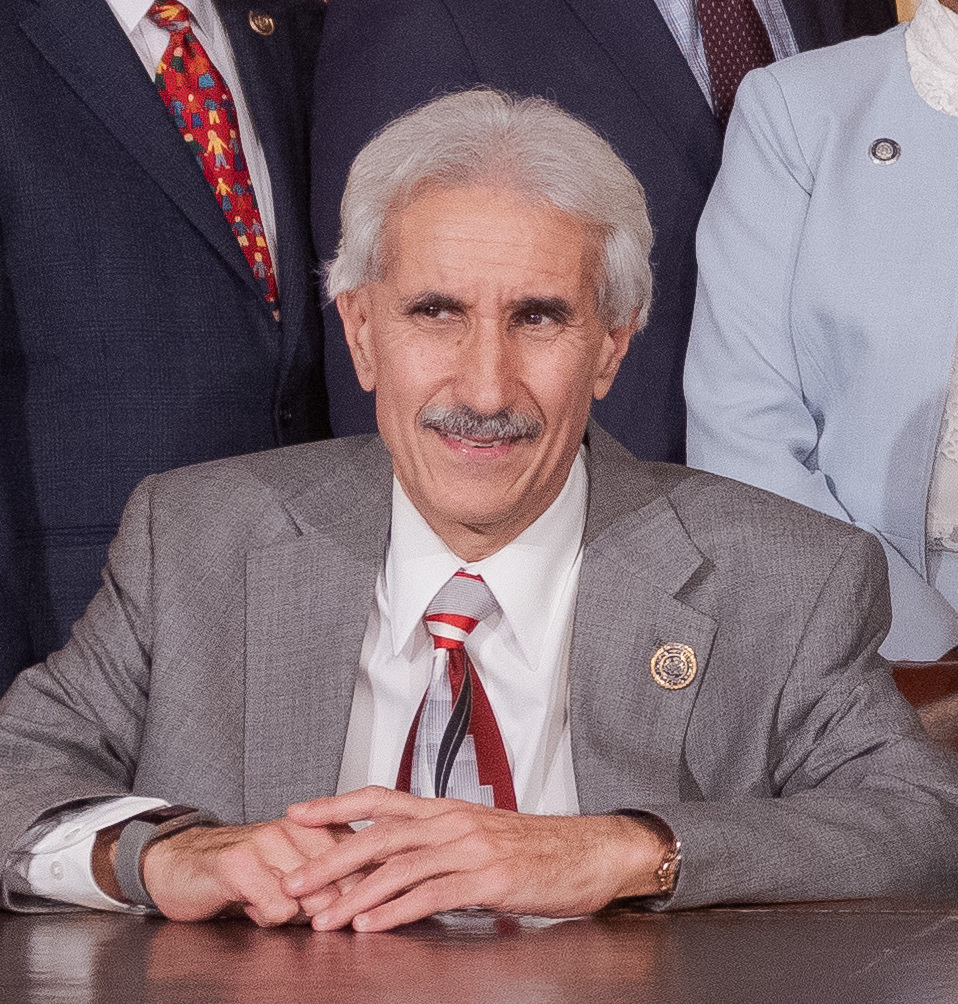

Member of the Pennsylvania House of Representatives from the 9th district
- In office January 3, 1995 – November 30, 2022
- Preceded by: Thomas Fee
- Succeeded by: Marla Brown

Member of the Lawrence County Board of Commissioners
- Incumbent
- Assumed office January 2, 2024

Personal details
- Born: May 8, 1959 (age 66) New Castle, Pennsylvania, U.S.
- Party: Democratic
- Education: Youngstown State University (B.S.)
- Alma mater: Union Area High School

Christopher Sainato (born May 8, 1959) is an American politician who represented the 9th District in the Pennsylvania House of Representatives from 1995 to 2022. He is a member of the Democratic Party.

== Early life and education ==
Sainato was born on May 8, 1959, in New Castle, Pennsylvania. He graduated from Union Area High School in 1977 and earned a Bachelor of Science degree from Youngstown State University in 1982.

== Political career ==
From 1983 to 1993, Sainato served as an aide to Congressman Joe Kolter.

In 1994, Sainato was elected to represent the 9th District in the Pennsylvania House of Representatives. Sainato was re-elected thirteen times; facing a Republican challenger on only a few occasions. In 2022, Sainato was defeated for re-election by Republican Marla Brown.

From the beginning of first term in 1995 to January 2021, Sainato collected $1.8 million dollars in taxpayer-funded reimbursements, perks, and per diems, according to Spotlight PA. When asked, Sainato balked at the alleged sum of his expenses. He also opposed changing the per diem structure to require documented expenses, labelling such an idea as an excess burden "for people like me who are very busy." In 2013, 2016, and 2021, Sainato collected the most in per diems than any other representative; his total yearly reimbursements typically topped $30,000. He defended the large reimbursement amounts by noting the 250-mile journey he took from his district to the capitol and his perfect attendance record.

In 2023, Sainato was elect as a county commissioner in Lawrence County.

== Political positions ==
Sainato is a conservative Democrat who opposes abortion rights. He was the sole Democrat to vote against bringing a bill to ban high-capacity, semi-automatic firearms to the State House floor for a vote. Sainato has been endorsed by the NRA Political Victory Fund. He has also opposed tax increases and favored abolition, voting against a 30 cents per gallon gasoline tax as state representative. As a county commissioner, Sainato voted to repeal a $5 vehicle registration fee that funded Lawrence County's road construction despite large public opposition.
