= Dick Cangey =

American stuntman

Richard Melvin Cangey (July 9, 1933 – October 29, 2003) was an American stunt performer and actor.

== Early life ==
Cangey was born in Mahoningtown, Pennsylvania. After graduating from New Castle High School in 1951, he moved to nearby Cleveland, Ohio, to pursue a career in boxing.

== Career ==
Cangey was a Hollywood stuntman. He was among the stock company of stuntmen employed on the 1960s western television series, The Wild Wild West. He was occasionally credited as an actor on the show, often as a henchman, such as Ben in S3 E14 "The Night of the Iron Fist" which aired 12/6/1967.

He had bit parts in other American TV series such as Gunsmoke, Mannix and Vega$.

== Personal life ==
At age 70, Cangey died in Orange County, California.

== Filmography ==
Year	Title	Role	Notes
1966-1969	The Wild Wild West	Henchman / Heavy / Guard	49 episodes, Uncredited
1975	Capone	Extra	Uncredited
