= Union Area School District =

School district in Pennsylvania

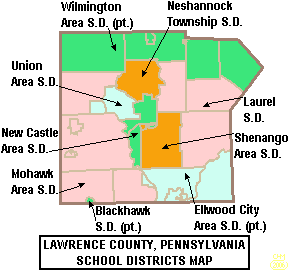

Address
- 500 South Scotland Lane New Castle, Lawrence County, Pennsylvania, 16101-1344; United States

District information
- Type: Public

Other information
- Website: www.unionareasd.org

Union Area School District is a diminutive, suburban public school district located in Lawrence County, Pennsylvania. The Union Area School District encompasses approximately 10 square miles (26 km^{2}). The District serves Union Township, Lawrence County, Pennsylvania as well the southeastern portion of Mahoning Township and the independent district of Edinburg which encompasses portions of several neighbouring townships. According to 2000 federal census data, Union Area School District served a resident population of 5,103. In 2010, the population was 5,563 people. In 2009, the district residents’ per capita income was $16,148, while the median family income was $41,086. In the Commonwealth, the median family income was $49,501 and the United States median family income was $49,445, in 2010.

Union Area School District operates one elementary school and a combined middle/high school ranging from sixth grade to twelfth grade.

== Extracurriculars ==
Union Area School District offers a variety of clubs, activities and an extensive sports program.

=== Sports ===
The District funds:

Boys

- Baseball - A
- Basketball - A
- Cross Country - A
- Football - A
- Golf - AA
- Track and Field - AA

Girls

- Basketball - A
- Cross Country - A
- Softball - A
- Track and Field - AA
- Volleyball - A

Junior High School Sports

Boys

- Baseball
- Basketball
- Cross Country
- Football
- Golf
- Track and Field

Girls

- Basketball
- Cross Country
- Softball
- Track and Field
- Volleyball

According to PIAA directory July 2012
