= Malik Hooker =

American football player (born 1996)

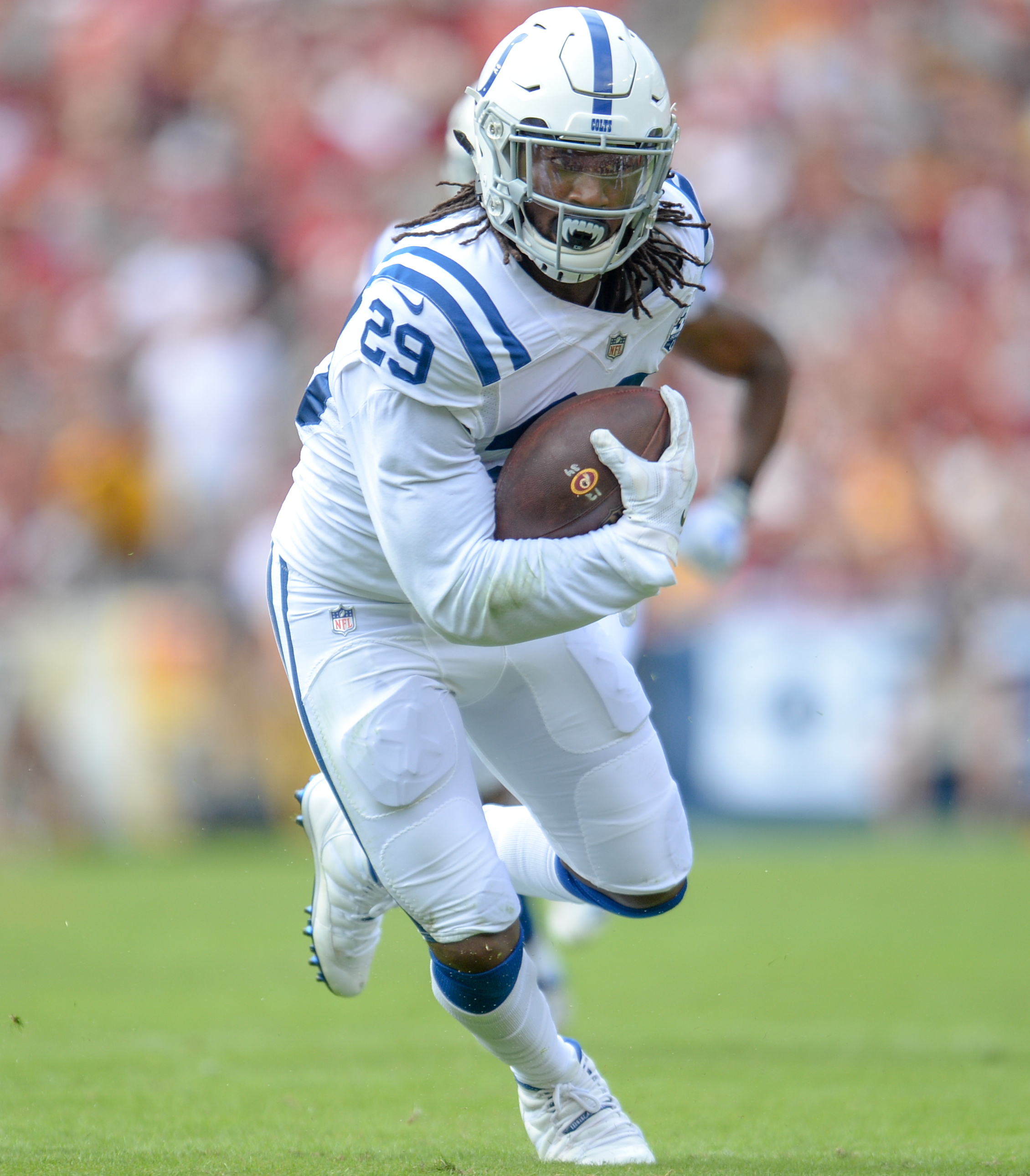
- Hooker with the Indianapolis Colts in 2018

No. 24 – Dallas Cowboys
- Position: Safety
- Roster status: Active

Personal information
- Born: April 2, 1996 (age 30); New Castle, Pennsylvania, U.S.
- Listed height: 6 ft 1 in (1.85 m)
- Listed weight: 215 lb (98 kg)

Career information
- High school: New Castle
- College: Ohio State (2014–2016)
- NFL draft: 2017: 1st round, 15th overall pick

Career history
- Indianapolis Colts (2017–2020); Dallas Cowboys (2021–present)

Awards and highlights
- CFP national champion (2014); Unanimous All-American (2016); First-team All-Big Ten (2016)

Career NFL statistics as of Week 3, 2026
- Total tackles: 414
- Forced fumbles: 1
- Fumble recoveries: 4
- Pass deflections: 25
- Interceptions: 14
- Defensive touchdowns: 1
- Stats at Pro Football Reference

Malik Hooker (born April 2, 1996) is an American professional football safety for the Dallas Cowboys of the National Football League (NFL). He played college football for the Ohio State Buckeyes and was selected by the Indianapolis Colts with the 15th overall pick in the 2017 NFL draft. While at Ohio State, Hooker was named a unanimous All-American in 2016 and won the 2015 CFP national championship.

== Early life ==
Hooker attended New Castle High School in New Castle, Pennsylvania. He played basketball and two years of football in high school as a cornerback and wide receiver. As a senior, he was the Pittsburgh Post-Gazette Male Athlete of the Year. A 3-star safety recruit, Hooker committed to play college football for the Ohio State Buckeyes over offers from Arizona, Boston College, Michigan, Nebraska, Penn State, Virginia Tech, and West Virginia, among others.

== College career ==
After redshirting his first year at Ohio State in 2014, Hooker played in all 13 games in 2015, recording 10 tackles playing mostly special teams. As a redshirt sophomore in 2016, he took over at free safety. During the first game of the season, he recorded his first two career interceptions. On November 29, 2016, Hooker was named first-team All-Big Ten. After the season, Hooker decided to forgo the remaining two years of eligibility and enter the 2017 NFL draft. After his college career, it was revealed that Hooker underwent surgeries for a torn labrum in his hip and a sports hernia. As a result, Hooker could not participate in the combine.

== Professional career ==
=== Pre-draft ===
External videos
- Mayock: Hooker's comparable to Ed Reed
- Hooker shows blazing speed
- Ohio State Pro Day: Malik Hooker

"The ultimate lurker. His instincts are always bringing him to the football and when he gets there he has the ball skills to take it away. His lack of game experience and issues with tackle consistency will likely show themselves early in his career, but his ability to flip the field is worthy of an aggressive projection. He has the talent to be a high-impact starter for years in the NFL."

— Lance Zierlein (NFL.com)

In February 2017, Hooker went through two surgeries to repair a hernia and a torn labrum. He attended the NFL Scouting Combine, but was unable to participate in any of the drills. 122 NFL scouts and representatives attended Ohio State's Pro Day as well as multiple head coaches, including Bill Belichick (New England Patriots), Todd Bowles (New York Jets), Jim Caldwell (Detroit Lions), John Harbaugh (Baltimore Ravens), Hue Jackson (Cleveland Browns), Marvin Lewis (Cincinnati Bengals), Mike Mularkey (Tennessee Titans), Sean Payton (New Orleans Saints), and Mike Tomlin (Pittsburgh Steelers). Hooker was projected to be a top 15 pick by NFL draft experts and analysts. He was ranked the top free safety in the draft by DraftScout.com and was ranked the second best safety in the draft, behind Jamal Adams, by Sports Illustrated, ESPN, Pro Football Focus, NFL analyst Mike Mayock, and NFL analyst Bucky Brooks.

Pre-draft measurables
Height	Weight	Arm length	Hand span	Wingspan	Wonderlic
6 ft 1 in (1.85 m)	206 lb (93 kg)	32 1/4 in (0.82 m)	10 3/4 in (0.27 m)	6 ft 5 3/4 in (1.97 m)	17
All values from NFL Combine

=== Indianapolis Colts ===
The Indianapolis Colts selected Hooker in the first round (15th overall) of the 2017 NFL draft. He was the second safety selected, behind LSU's Jamal Adams.

"At this point, Hooker would be a steal—flip him into Adams's spot at 6 or Peppers's at 10, and no one would bat an eye. The Colts' defense in general has to become faster, more athletic. Hooker checks both boxes as a ball–hawking threat at safety. A scary thought: For as great as he was this season, he played just 19 games at Ohio State. The best is yet to come."

— Chris Burke (Sports Illustrated)

External videos
- Colts select Malik Hooker No. 15 overall
- Mayock: Hooker can go sideline to sideline

"He'll fit in with Indianapolis beautifully. He's the best center fielder in this draft so far. ... The biggest concern is not the injuries, but the inconsistent tackling."

— Mike Mayock (NFL Network)

==== 2017 season ====
External videos
- 1st rounder Malik Hooker arrives in Indy

On May 18, 2017, the Indianapolis Colts signed Hooker to a fully guaranteed four–year, $12.59 million contract that includes an initial signing bonus of $2.29 million.

Hooker missed offseason workouts while recovering from surgery and suffered a groin injury during the first day of training camp. A shoulder injury further stunted his process and he was only able to appear in a single preseason game. Head coach Chuck Pagano named Hooker the backup free safety to begin the regular season behind Darius Butler, who began the season alongside strong safety Matthias Farley.

On September 10, 2017, Hooker made his professional regular season debut in the Indianapolis Colts' season-opener at the Los Angeles Rams and recorded four combined tackles (three solo) in their 46–9 loss. On September 17, 2017, Hooker earned his first career start in place of Darius Butler, who was inactive after sustaining a hamstring injury in Week 1. He recorded two combined tackles (one solo), deflected a pass, and recorded his first career interception off a pass by quarterback Carson Palmer during their 16–13 overtime loss to the Arizona Cardinals in Week 2. Defensive coordinator Ted Monachino named Hooker the starting free safety for the remainder of the season, supplanting Darius Butler. The following week, he made three combined tackles (two solo), broke up a pass, and intercepted a pass thrown by DeShone Kizer during a 31–28 victory against the Cleveland Browns. In Week 4, Hooker made three combined tackles (one solo), a pass deflection, and had his third consecutive game with an interception off a pass thrown by Russell Wilson in their 46–18 loss at the Seattle Seahawks. On October 8, 2017, Hooker collected a season-high five combined tackles (four solo) during a 26–23 victory against the San Francisco 49ers. In Week 7, Hooker made two solo tackles before leaving the Colts' 27–0 loss to the Jacksonville Jaguars in the second quarter after suffering a torn ACL and MCL. On October 24, 2017, the Indianapolis Colts officially placed Hooker on injured reserve after it was discovered he would require surgery and miss the remainder of the season. On December 31, 2017, the Indianapolis Colts announced their decision to fire head coach Chuck Pagano after they finished the 2017 NFL season with a 4–12 record. He finished his rookie season with 22 combined tackles (16 solo), four pass deflections, and three interceptions in seven games and six starts.

==== 2018 season ====
On February 11, 2018, the Indianapolis Colts announced their decision to hire former Philadelphia Eagles' offensive coordinator Frank Reich as their new head coach. He entered training camp projected to win the role as the starting free safety following the departure of Darius Butler. He competed with Matthias Farley, T. J. Green, George Odum, and Ronald Martin. Defensive coordinator Matt Eberflus named Hooker the starting free safety to begin the season, alongside strong safety Clayton Geathers.

On September 9, 2018, he returned from his injury in the Indianapolis Colts' home-opener against the Cincinnati Bengals and made four solo tackles in the 34–23 loss. On October 12, 2018, Hooker collected a season-high 12 combined tackles (four solo) during a 24–38 loss at the New England Patriots. The following week, he recorded one solo tackle and made his first interception of the season off a pass thrown by rookie quarterback Sam Darnold and returned it for 27–yards in the 42–34 loss at the New York Jets. He was inactive for a Week 8 win at the Oakland Raiders after straining his hip. His injury would also sideline him for Week 11 as the Colts defeated the Tennessee Titans 38–10. In Week 16, Hooker made six combined tackles (four solo), one pass deflection, and intercepted a pass by Eli Manning to wide receiver Bennie Fowler to seal a 28–27 win against the New York Giants in the closing seconds in the fourth quarter. He finished the season with 44 combined tackles (30 solo), four pass deflections, two interceptions, and one fumble recovery in 14 games and 14 starts. He earned an overall grade of 79.7 from Pro Football Focus in 2018 and a coverage grade of 81.6.

The Indianapolis Colts finished the 2018 NFL season second in the AFC South with a 10–6 record and clinched a wildcard position. On January 5, 2019, he started in his first career playoff game and made two combined tackles (one solo) during a 21–7 win at the Houston Texans in the AFC Wildcard Game. He injured his foot during the game and was subsequently unable to participate in the Colts' 31–13 loss at the Kansas City Chiefs in the Divisional Round.

==== 2019 season ====
He entered training camp slated as the de facto starting free safety. Head coach Frank Reich retained Hooker and Clayton Geathers as the starting safety tandem to begin the season. On September 8, 2019, Hooker started in the Indianapolis Colts' season-opener at the Los Angeles Chargers and made five combined tackles (four solo), one pass deflection, and intercepted a pass by Philip Rivers to wide receiver Keenan Allen in the endzone and returned it 26–yards in the 30–24 overtime loss. He injured his knee and was inactive for three consecutive games (Weeks 4–7). On December 8, 2019, he collected a season-high ten combined tackles (nine solo), broke up a pass, and intercepted a pass by Jameis Winston in the Colts' 35–38 loss at the Tampa Bay Buccaneers. He finished the 2019 NFL season with 51 combined tackles (30 solo), three pass deflections, two interceptions, and one fumble recovery in 13 games and 13 starts. He received an overall grade of 69.5 from Pro Football Focus in 2019.

==== 2020 season ====
On May 1, 2020, the Indianapolis Colts declined the fifth–year option on Hooker's contract, making him a free agent in 2021. Throughout training camp, he competed against Khari Willis, Tavon Wilson, Ibraheim Campbell, Julian Blackmon, and George Odum. Head coach Frank Reich named Hooker as the starting free safety to start the season, alongside strong safety Khari Willis. On September 13, 2020, he collected a season-high five combined tackles (three solo) during a 20–27 loss at the Jacksonville Jaguars. On September 20, 2020, Hooker made two solo tackles before exiting in the third quarter of a 28–11 win against the Minnesota Vikings after tearing his Achilles. On September 15, 2020, the Indianapolis Colts officially placed him on injured reserve for the rest of the season. He finished the 2020 NFL season with seven combined tackles (five solo) in two games and two starts.

=== Dallas Cowboys ===
==== 2021 season ====
On July 27, 2021, the Dallas Cowboys signed Hooker to a one–year, $920,000 contract that includes $490,000 guaranteed upon signing. Throughout training camp, he competed to be a starting safety against Damontae Kazee, Jayron Kearse, Donovan Wilson, Keanu Neal, and Israel Mukuamu. Head coach Mike McCarthy named Hooker a backup free safety to begin the season, behind starter Damontae Kazee and strong safety Donovan Wilson.

On December 19, 2021, Hooker collected a season-high six combined tackles (five solo), one pass deflection, and intercepted a pass by Mike Glennon to wide receiver Sterling Shepard during a 21–6 win at the New York Giants. The following week, he was inactive as a healthy scratch as the Cowboys defeated the Washington Football Team 56–14. He finished the 2021 NFL season with a total of 44 combined tackles (30 solo) two pass deflections, and one interception in 15 games and two starts.

==== 2022 season ====
On March 15, 2022, the Dallas Cowboys signed Hooker to a two–year, $7.00 million contract extension that included $2.00 million guaranteed and an initial signing bonus of $1.70 million.

During training camp, defensive coordinator Dan Quinn held a competition between Hooker, Jayron Kearse, and Israel Mukuamu to name a new starting free safety to replace Damontae Kazee. Head coach Mike McCarthy named him a backup safety to begin the season, behind starting safeties Donovan Wilson and Jayron Kearse.

On October 16, 2022, Hooker collected a season-high 13 combined tackles (ten solo) in the Cowboys' 17–26 loss at the Philadelphia Eagles. On December 4, 2022, Hooker recorded two solo tackles, made a pass deflection, one interception, and returned a fumble recovery for his first career touchdown during a 54–19 win against the Indianapolis Colts. He scored the touchdown in the fourth quarter after Matt Ryan passed the ball to tight end Mo Alie-Cox and Cowboys' teammate Damone Clark forced a fumble by Alie-Cox that was recovered by Hooker and returned 38–yards for a touchdown. In Week 18, he made four combined tackles (one solo), broke up a pass, and tied his career-high of three interceptions after intercepting a pass by Sam Howell during a 6–26 loss at the Washington Commanders. He finished the season with 62 combined tackles (44 solo), three pass deflections, three interceptions, one fumble recovery, and one touchdown in 16 games and six starts. He received an overall grade of 76.2 from Pro Football Focus and a coverage grade of 74.8.

The Dallas Cowboys finished the 2022 NFL season second in the NFC East with a 12–5 record, clinching a Wildcard berth. On January 16, 2023, he started in the NFC Wildcard Game and made six combined tackles (five solo) during a 31–14 win at the Tampa Bay Buccaneers. The following week, he made eight combined tackles (three solo) as the Cowboys lost 12–19 at the San Francisco 49ers in the Divisional Round.

==== 2023 season ====
On August 4, 2023, the Dallas Cowboys re-signed Hooker to a three–year, $21 million contract extension that includes $11 million guaranteed upon signing and an initial signing bonus of $8 million. He entered training camp slated as the starting free safety. Head coach Mike McCarthy named him the starting free safety to begin the season, alongside strong safety Jayron Kearse.

On September 17, 2023, he made two combined tackles (one solo), a career-high two pass deflections, and intercepted a pass thrown by Zach Wilson to wide receiver Garrett Wilson in the Cowboys' 30–10 win against the New York Jets. In Week 5, he collected a season-high six combined tackles (three solo) as the Cowboys were routed 10–42 at the San Francisco 49ers. He finished the season with 50 combined tackles (27 solo), three pass deflections, one interception, a forced fumble, and a fumble recovery in 16 games and 15 starts. He received an overall grade of 77.2 from Pro Football Focus in 2023.

==== 2024 season ====
The Dallas Cowboys hired Mike Zimmer as their new defensive coordinator after Dan Quinn accepted the head coaching position with the Washington Commanders. Zimmer retained Hooker as the starting free safety and paired him with Donovan Wilson.

On November 18, 2024, Hooker made eight combined tackles (three solo), a pass deflection, and returned an interception thrown by C. J. Stroud to wide receiver Nico Collins for 21–yards during a 10–34 loss against the Houston Texans. In Week 17, he collected a season-high nine combined tackles (six solo) as the Cowboys were routed 7–41 at the Philadelphia Eagles. He started in all 17 games during the 2024 NFL season and had a career-high 81 combined tackles (51 solo), five pass deflections, and two interceptions. He received an overall grade of 65.3 from Pro Football Focus which ranked 72nd out of 170 qualifying safeties in 2024. His coverage grade of 57.8 ranked 104th amongst his position group.

==== 2025 season ====
Hooker started Dallas' first four games of the season, recording 20 combined tackles. After suffering a toe injury in Week 4 against the Green Bay Packers, Hooker was placed on injured reserve on October 4, 2025. He was activated on November 17, ahead of the team's Week 11 matchup against the Las Vegas Raiders.

== NFL career statistics ==
Legend
**Bold**	Career high

=== Regular season ===
Year	Team	Games		Tackles					Interceptions						Fumbles			
Year	Team	GP	GS	Comb	Solo	Ast	Sck	TFL	PD	Int	Yds	Avg	Lng	TD	FF	FR	Yds	TD
2017	IND	7	6	22	16	6	0.0	0	4	**3**	**73**	**24.3**	**32**	0	0	0	0	0
2018	IND	14	14	44	30	14	0.0	0	4	2	34	17.0	27	0	0	**1**	0	0
2019	IND	13	13	51	30	21	0.0	1	3	2	39	19.5	26	0	0	**1**	3	0
2020	IND	2	2	7	5	2	0.0	0	0	0	0	0.0	0	0	0	0	0	0
2021	DAL	15	3	44	30	14	0.0	1	2	1	0	0.0	0	0	0	0	0	0
2022	DAL	16	6	62	44	18	0.0	2	3	**3**	29	9.7	26	0	0	**1**	**38**	**1**
2023	DAL	16	15	50	27	23	0.0	1	3	1	0	0.0	0	0	**1**	**1**	0	0
2024	DAL	17	17	**81**	**51**	**30**	0.0	**3**	**5**	2	20	10.0	21	0	0	0	0	0
2025	DAL	12	12	52	28	24	0.0	2	1	0	0	0.0	0	0	0	0	0	0
Career		112	88	413	261	152	0.0	10	25	14	195	13.9	32	0	1	4	41	1

=== Postseason ===
Year	Team	Games		Tackles					Interceptions						Fumbles			
Year	Team	GP	GS	Comb	Solo	Ast	Sck	TFL	PD	Int	Yds	Avg	Lng	TD	FF	FR	Yds	TD
2018	IND	1	1	2	1	1	0.0	0	0	0	0	0.0	0	0	0	0	0	0
2021	DAL	1	0	3	0	3	0.0	0	0	0	0	0.0	0	0	0	0	0	0
2022	DAL	2	2	**14**	**8**	**6**	0.0	0	0	0	0	0.0	0	0	0	0	0	0
2023	DAL	1	0	1	1	0	0.0	0	0	0	0	0.0	0	0	0	0	0	0
Career		5	3	20	10	10	0.0	0	0	0	0	0.0	0	0	0	0	0	0
