= Paul Cuba =

American football player (1908–1990)

No. 21
- Position: Tackle

Personal information
- Born: June 12, 1908; New Castle, Pennsylvania, U.S.
- Died: August 12, 1990 (aged 82); New Castle, Pennsylvania, U.S.
- Listed height: 6 ft 0 in (1.83 m)
- Listed weight: 212 lb (96 kg)

Career information
- High school: New Castle
- College: Pittsburgh

Career history
- Philadelphia Eagles (1933–1935)
- Stats at Pro Football Reference

Paul J. Cuba (June 12, 1908 – August 12, 1990) was an American professional football tackle who played three seasons with the Philadelphia Eagles of the National Football League (NFL). He played college football at the University of Pittsburgh.

== Early life and college ==
Paul J. Cuba was born on June 12, 1908, in New Castle, Pennsylvania, and attended New Castle High School there. He lettered for the Pittsburgh Panthers football team in 1932. He also played basketball and baseball for the Panthers.

== Professional career ==
Cuba signed with the Philadelphia Eagles on August 28, 1933. He played in nine games, starting eight, during the 1933 season. He appeared in ten games, all starts, in 1934. Cuba played in ten games for the second straight season, starting eight, in 1935. He became a free agent in 1936.

== Later life ==
Cuba died on August 12, 1990, in New Castle, Pennsylvania.
