= Mahoning Township, Lawrence County, Pennsylvania =

Township in Pennsylvania, US

Coordinates: 40°59′30″N 80°30′29″W

Mahoning Township
- Township
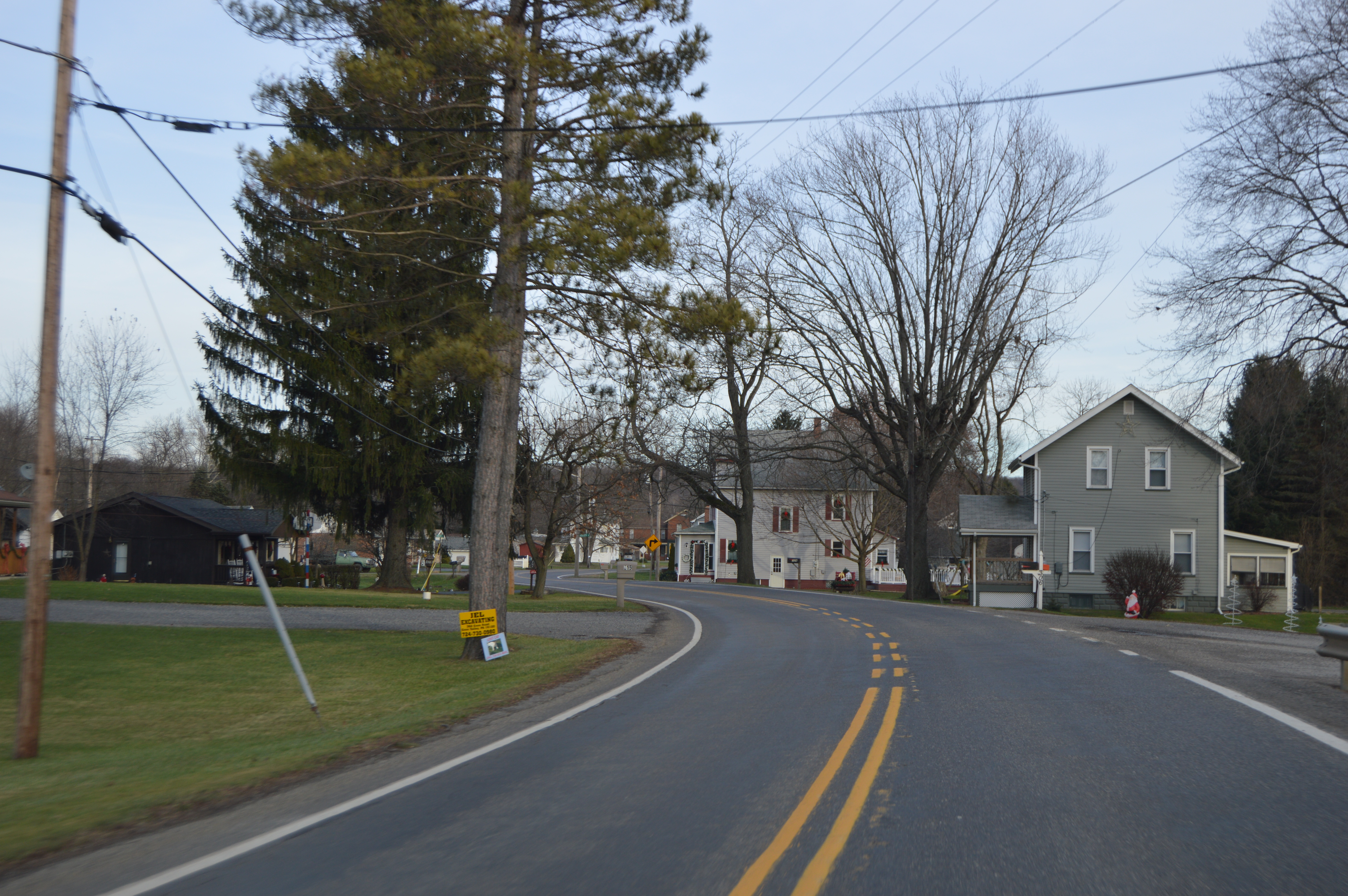
- Houses in Edinburg

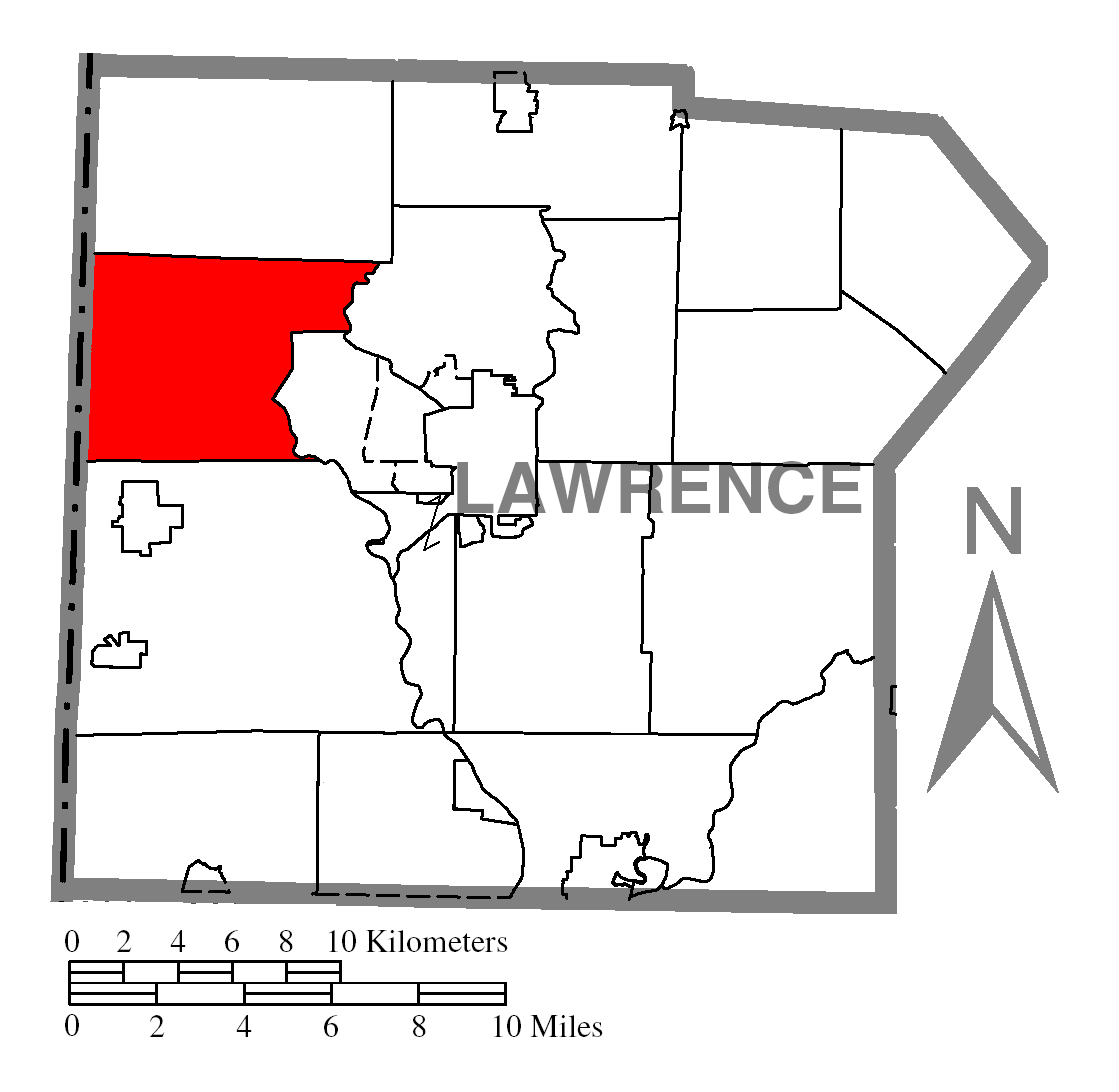
- Location of Mahoning Township in Lawrence County

- Location of Lawrence County in Pennsylvania
- Country: United States
- State: Pennsylvania
- County: Lawrence
- Established: 1806

Area
  - Total: 24.70 sq mi (63.98 km^{2})
  - Land: 23.91 sq mi (61.92 km^{2})
  - Water: 0.79 sq mi (2.05 km^{2})
- Highest elevation (several points in northwestern part of township): 1,200 ft (370 m)
- Lowest elevation (Mahoning River): 760 ft (230 m)

Population (2020)
  - Total: 2,709
  - Estimate (2022): 2,660
  - Density: 122.7/sq mi (47.36/km^{2})
- Time zone: UTC-4 (EST)
  - Summer (DST): UTC-5 (EDT)
- Area code: 724
- FIPS code: 42-073-46648
- Website: mahoningtownship.net

Historical population
Census	Pop.	Note	%±
2000	3,447		—
2010	3,083		−10.6%
2020	2,709		−12.1%
2022 (est.)	2,660		−1.8%

Mahoning Township is a township in Lawrence County, Pennsylvania, United States. The population was 2,709 at the time of the 2020 census, a decline from the figure of 3,083 tabulated in 2010. The township was originally incorporated in 1806 as part of Mercer County, and in 1849, joined the newly created Lawrence County.

== Geography ==
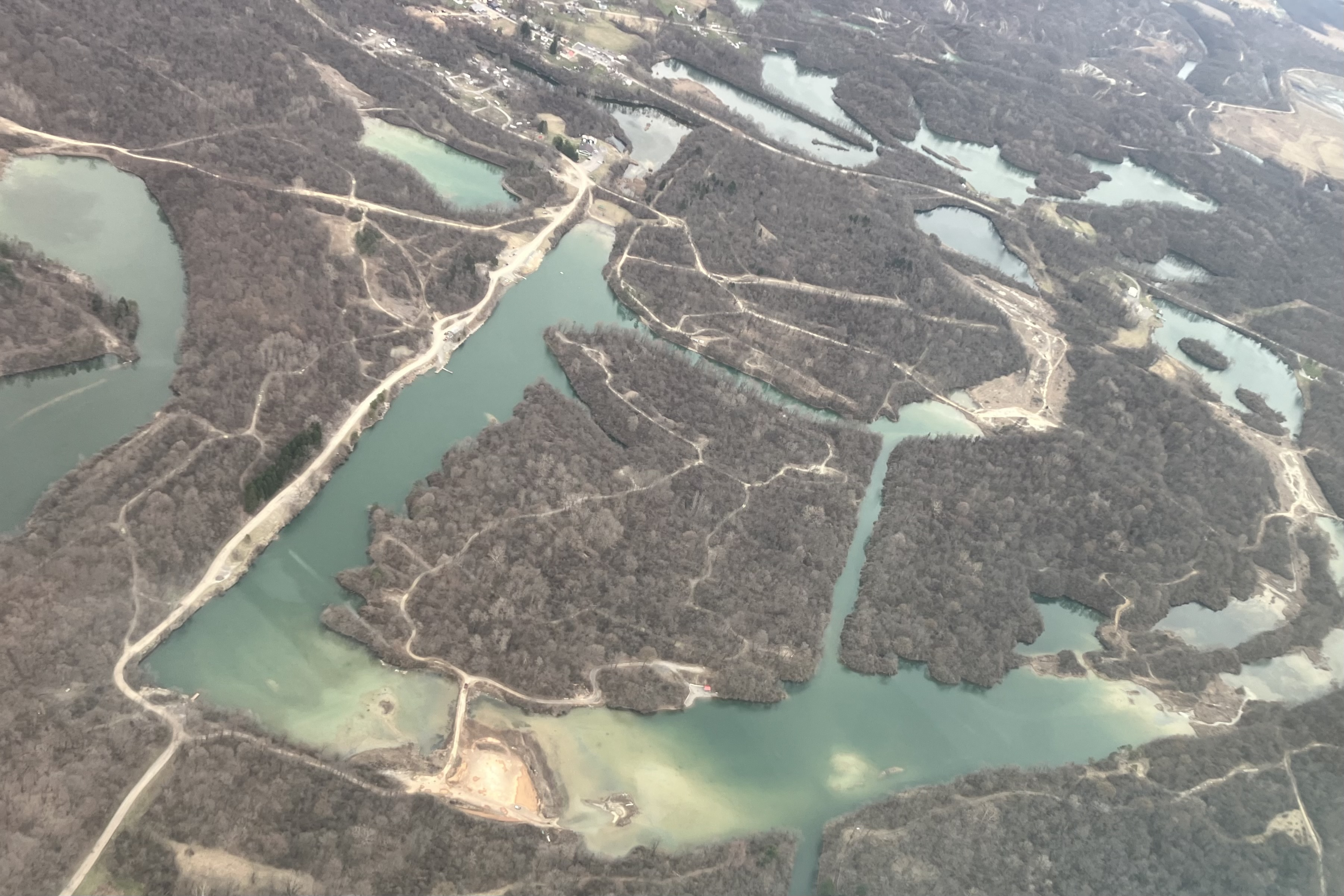
Waterways from 2000ft above the ground

According to the United States Census Bureau, the township has a total area of 25.0 square miles (64.7 km^{2}), of which 24.5 square miles (63.6 km^{2}) is land and 0.4 square miles (1.2 km^{2}), or 1.80%, is water.

The western border of the township is the Ohio state line.

It contains the unincorporated communities of Hillsville, Peanut, Edinburg, North Edinburg, and Robinson.

== Demographics ==
As of the census of 2000, there were 3,447 people, 1,373 households, and 966 families residing in the township.

The population density was 140.4 inhabitants per square mile (54.2/km^{2}). There were 1,436 housing units at an average density of 58.5 per square mile (22.6/km^{2}).

The racial makeup of the township was 98.84% White, 0.29% African American, 0.12% Native American, 0.17% Asian, 0.12% from other races, and 0.46% from two or more races. Hispanic or Latino of any race were 0.35% of the population.

There were 1,373 households, out of which 31.1% had children under the age of 18 living with them; 54.8% were married couples living together, 10.9% had a female householder with no husband present, and 29.6% were non-families. 25.9% of all households were made up of individuals, and 13.4% had someone living alone who was 65 years of age or older.

The average household size was 2.49 and the average family size was 3.00.

In the township the population was spread out, with 23.7% under the age of 18, 6.7% from 18 to 24, 28.8% from 25 to 44, 23.9% from 45 to 64, and 16.9% who were 65 years of age or older. The median age was 40 years.

For every 100 females, there were 96.0 males. For every 100 females aged 18 and over, there were 94.7 males.

The median income for a household in the township was $32,267, and the median income for a family was $39,635. Males had a median income of $32,985 compared with that of $21,810 for females.

The per capita income for the township was $15,878.

Roughly 8.7% of families and 10.8% of the population were living below the poverty line, including 15.0% of those under age eighteen and 9.5% of those who were aged 65 or over.

== Education ==
The majority of the township is served by the Mohawk Area School District while the south-easternmost portion, including Edinburg, is served by the Union Area School District.

== Transportation ==
=== Major roads and highways ===
- US 224
- US 422
- PA 551
