= Marla Brown =

American politician

Member of the Pennsylvania House of Representatives from the 9th district
- Incumbent
- Assumed office January 3, 2023
- Preceded by: Chris Sainato

Personal details
- Born: 1970 (age 55–56) Edinburg, Pennsylvania, U.S.
- Party: Republican
- Spouse: Greg Brown
- Children: 3
- Education: Gannon University (BA); Geneva College (MS)
- Alma mater: Mohawk High School
- Website: www.repmarlabrown.com

Marla A. Gallo Brown (born 1970) is an American politician who currently represents the 9th District in the Pennsylvania House of Representatives since 2023. She is a member of the Republican Party.

== Early life and education ==
Brown was born in 1970, the eldest of four siblings, in Edinburg, Pennsylvania. She is of Italian ancestry. She graduated from Mohawk High School in 1988. She earned a Bachelor of Arts degree from Gannon University in 1992 and a Master of Science from Geneva College in 2000.

== Career ==
Brown worked for UPS for 15 years, including working in London as the company's director of sales and marketing for the United Kingdom and Ireland. She later ran a medical spa in Georgia for nine years.

In 2022, Brown won a three-way Republican primary election to challenge incumbent Democratic Pennsylvania State Representative from the 9th District Chris Sainato. She defeated Sainato in the general election.

== Political positions ==
=== Abortion ===
Brown opposes the right to an abortion. From 2015 to 2018, she was CEO of Pregnancy Aid Clinic, an Atlanta-based Catholic anti-abortion organization.

=== Criminal justice ===
Following a spate of local false school shooting reports in 2023, Brown introduced a bill to elevate making a false emergency call to elicit a police response, otherwise known as swatting, from a misdemeanor offense to a felony.

Brown supports decreasing the state parole board vote for clemency from unanimous approval to a simple majority.

=== Election reform ===
In April 2023, Brown introduced a bill that would create open primary elections in Pennsylvania. She has argued against closed primary elections, saying that they are unfair to independent votes who cannot participate in elections funded by their tax dollars. In an op-ed with State Representative Jared Solomon, Brown also argued that primary election should be open because of the large number of veterans, young people, and minorities who are registered as independents.

Brown has called monetary campaign fundraising a "necessary evil of the [election] process," which is nonetheless beneficial because it demonstrates whether a candidate is capable of successfully spreading their message.

=== Legislative perks ===
During her 2022 campaign, Brown signed a pledge to refuse state per diems, state pension, or taxpayer-funded car. Brown also pledge to only serve eight years in the state legislature.

=== Minimum wage ===
Brown voted against a bill to incrementally raise Pennsylvania's minimum to fifteen dollars an hour by 2026.

== Personal life ==
Brown lives in New Castle, Pennsylvania with her husband Greg Brown. She has three children.

== Electoral history ==
2022 Pennsylvania House of Representatives Republican primary election, District 9
Party	Candidate	Votes	%
Republican	Marla Brown	3,192	42.62
Republican	Nick Kerin	2,896	38.66
Republican	Darryl Audia	1,352	18.05
Write-in	Chris Sainato	40	0.53
Write-in	Scattered	10	0.13
Total votes		7,490	100.00

2022 Pennsylvania House of Representatives election, District 9
Party	Candidate	Votes	%
Republican	Marla Brown	13,721	52.81
Democratic	Chris Sainato (incumbent)	12,219	47.03
Write-in		44	0.17
Total votes		25,984	100.00

2024 Pennsylvania House of Representatives election, District 9
Party	Candidate	Votes	%
Republican	Marla Brown	27,029	94.66
Write-in		1,524	5.34
Total votes		28,553	100.00
