= Mario Cardullo =

American inventor

Mario Cardullo is an American inventor who received the first patent for a passive, read-write Radio-frequency identification. He is a 1957 graduate of the Polytechnic Institute of Brooklyn, now known as the New York University Tandon School of Engineering. He earned his doctorate degree from the George Mason University.
