= David Young (basketball) =

American basketball player (born 1981)

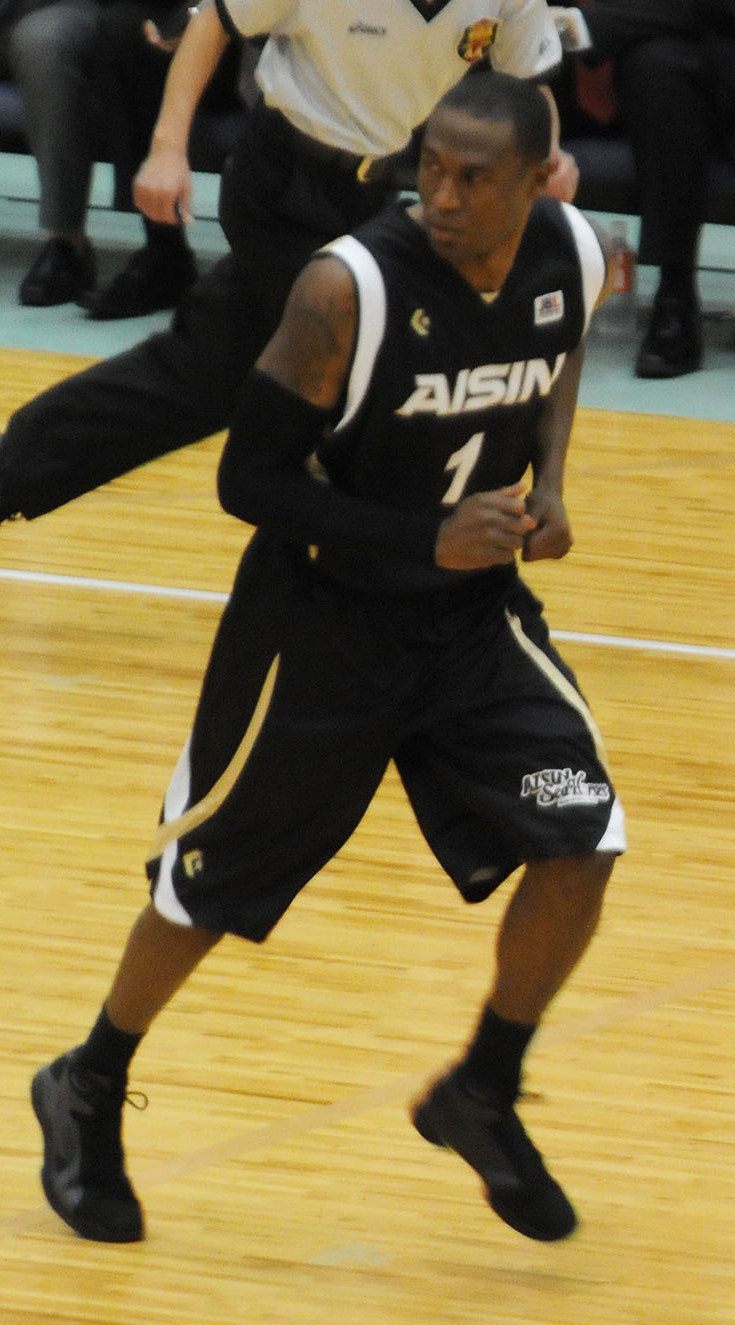
- Young with the Aisin Seahorses in 2008

Personal information
- Born: August 18, 1981 (age 45) New Castle, Pennsylvania, U.S.
- Listed height: 6 ft 5 in (1.96 m)
- Listed weight: 205 lb (93 kg)

Career information
- High school: New Castle (New Castle, Pennsylvania)
- College: Xavier (2000–2003); North Carolina Central (2003–2004)
- NBA draft: 2004: 2nd round, 41st overall pick
- Drafted by: Seattle SuperSonics
- Playing career: 2004–2016
- Position: Small forward / shooting guard

Career history
- 2004–2005: Fayetteville Patriots
- 2005–2006: Scandone Avellino
- 2006: Budućnost Podgorica
- 2006–2007: Dinamo Sassari
- 2007: Criollos de Caguas
- 2007: Pau-Orthez
- 2008: Rethymno Aegean
- 2008–2009: Aisin Seahorses
- 2009: Scafati Basket
- 2010: Trikala 2000
- 2010–2011: Jilin Northeast Tigers
- 2011: San Miguel Beermen
- 2012: Cañeros de la Romana
- 2016: Samen-Mashhad

Career highlights
- All-NBDL Second Team (2005); First-team All-CIAA (2004)
- Stats at Basketball Reference

David Martin Young (born August 18, 1981) is an American former basketball player who graduated from Xavier University and North Carolina Central University and was drafted by the Seattle SuperSonics in the 2004 NBA draft. He was signed to a contract but waived a month later, before he played in any NBA games.

== Career ==
He played the 2009–2010 season in Trikala 2000 in the Greek League. He has played professionally in Italy for Air Avellino (2005–2006) and Banco di Sardegna Sassari (Serie A2, 2006–2007) and also in the Greek League with Rethymno. In 2007/08 season, he joined France's Élan Béarnais Pau-Orthez. Subsequent to his stint with the Seattle SuperSonics, David played for the NBA's Developmental League (D-League) where he finished the season second in scoring with 18.5ppg. In March 2011, Young signed with a Philippine Basketball Association team, the San Miguel Beermen.

Young is a graduate of New Castle High School in New Castle, Pennsylvania. He has a degree in Criminal Justice from Xavier University. He has one daughter. He is the brother-in-law of Leon Washington, a former player for the NFL's Seattle Seahawks.
