= Leslie Sansone =

Fitness and aerobics instructor

- Born: February 14, 1961 (age 65); New Castle, Pennsylvania, US
- Other name: Leslie Sansone Tommelleo
- Occupation: Fitness instructor
- Spouse: Joseph Bullano (m. 1994)
- Website: lesliesansone.com

Leslie Ann Sansone (born February 14, 1961) is an American fitness instructor from New Castle, Pennsylvania. Since her first video was published in 1980, she has released over a hundred DVDs and four books. Sansone promotes walking exercises, resulting in a business self-reported to be worth $200 million.

== Early life and family ==
Sansone was born on February 14, 1961, in New Castle, Pennsylvania. She briefly studied engineering at the University of Pittsburgh and Youngstown State University before dropping out to work full-time as a fitness instructor. Sansone has three children, the younger two of whom she had with Joseph Bullano, whom she married in 1994.
