= Thomas Fee =

American politician

Member of the Pennsylvania House of Representatives from the 9th district
- In office 1969–1994
- Preceded by: District created
- Succeeded by: Chris Sainato

Personal details
- Born: January 6, 1931 New Castle, Pennsylvania
- Died: August 7, 2013 (aged 82) New Castle, Pennsylvania
- Party: Democratic
- Spouse: Lucretia Fuleno Fee
- Children: 6
- Education: New Castle Senior High School
- Occupation: Former Plasterer

Thomas J. Fee (January 6, 1931 – August 7, 2013) was an American Democratic politician who served as a member of the Pennsylvania House of Representatives.

== Biography ==
Fee was born in New Castle, Pennsylvania on January 6, 1931.

In 1973, he co-sponsored legislation with Rep. Anita Palermo Kelly to improve the quality of medical care available to Pennsylvanians and address the growing shortage of doctors across the Commonwealth of Pennsylvania by improving training requirements for physicians' assistants in order to enable those healthcare professionals to perform a wider range of medical procedures under the supervision of qualified physicians.

He died at a nursing home in New Castle on August 7, 2013.
