= Spandan Daftary =

Spandan "Spoon" Daftary (born April 13, 1981 in New Castle, Pennsylvania) is a three-time Emmy Award–winning producer of television sports shows.

== Professional career ==
Spandan worked on ESPN's Sportscenter in 2003 and 2004 when the show won consecutive Sports Emmy awards for "Outstanding Daily Studio Show". He worked on ESPN2's Quite Frankly with Stephen A. Smith, which was cancelled by the network in January 2007. He moved to Foxsports, where he worked on the NFL Kickoff show.

== High-school athletics ==
Spandan started at forward for Sewickley Academy's 1999 Section Championship squad. The head coach of the team, Victor Gianatta, gave Spandan the nickname, "Spoon".
