= Ben Ciccone =

American football player (1909–1990)

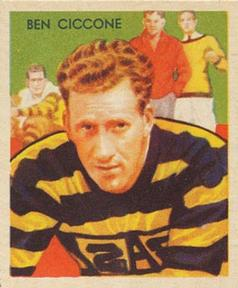

No. 16, 28
- Position: Center / Linebacker

Personal information
- Born: October 10, 1909; New Castle, Pennsylvania, U.S.
- Died: July 7, 1990 (aged 80); New Castle, Pennsylvania, U.S.
- Listed height: 5 ft 10 in (1.78 m)
- Listed weight: 197 lb (89 kg)

Career information
- High school: New Castle (New Castle, Pennsylvania)
- College: Duquesne

Career history
- Pittsburgh Pirates (1934–1935); Chicago Cardinals (1942)
- Stats at Pro Football Reference

Benjamain M. "Scaggie" Ciccone (October 10, 1909 – July 7, 1990) was an American football player who played for the Pittsburgh Steelers and the Chicago Cardinals. Ciccone played College football at Duquesne University.
