= Taylor Township, Lawrence County, Pennsylvania =

Township in Pennsylvania, US

Coordinates: 40.955°N 80.362°W

Taylor Township
- Township
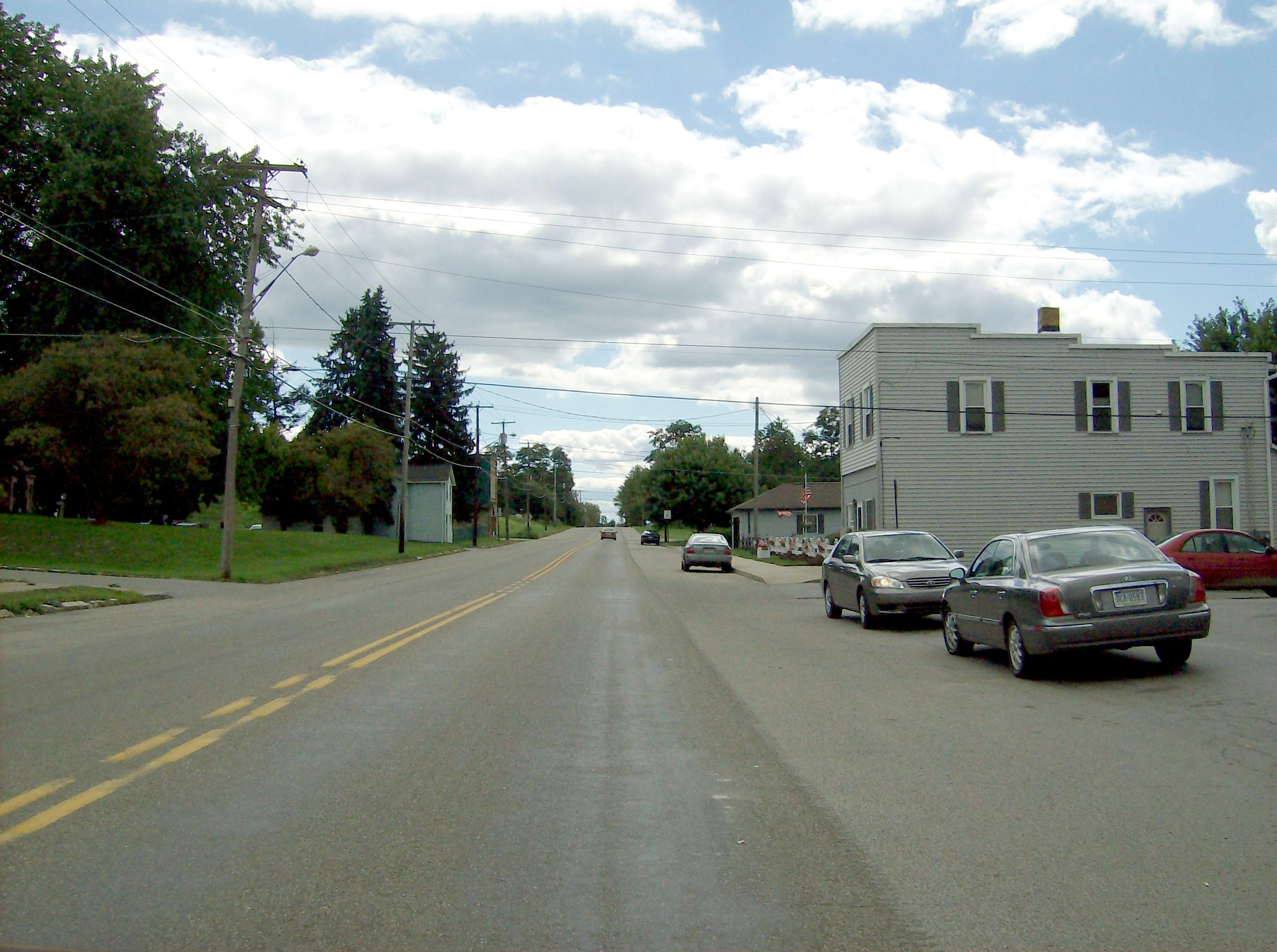
- Main Street in West Pittsburg

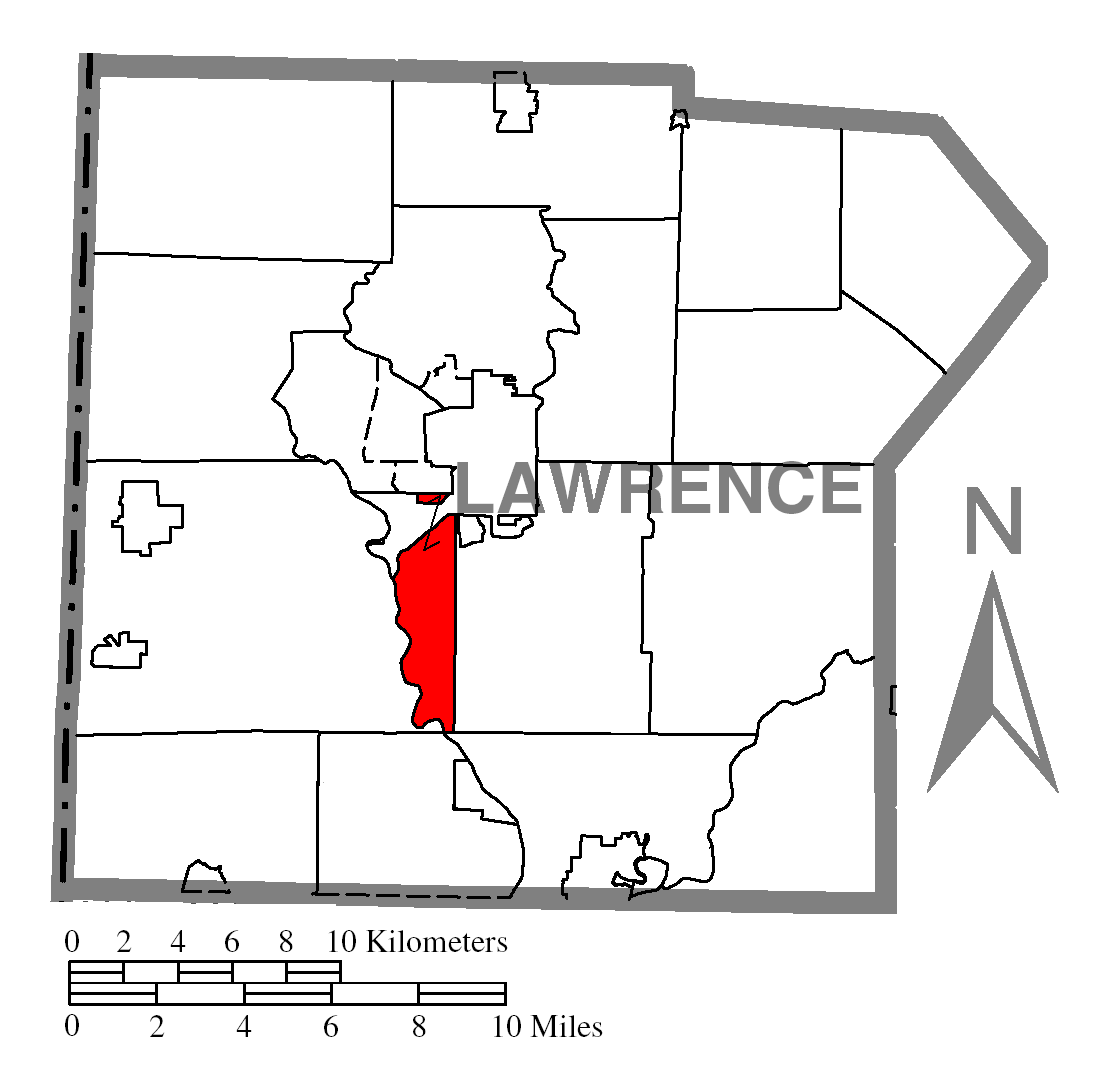
- Location of Taylor Township in Lawrence County

- Location of Lawrence County in Pennsylvania
- Country: United States
- State: Pennsylvania
- County: Lawrence
- Established: 1853

Area
  - Total: 5.48 sq mi (14.20 km^{2})
  - Land: 5.21 sq mi (13.50 km^{2})
  - Water: 0.27 sq mi (0.70 km^{2})
- Highest elevation (east of West Pittsburg): 1,200 ft (370 m)
- Lowest elevation (Beaver River): 758 ft (231 m)

Population (2020)
  - Total: 995
  - Estimate (2022): 977
  - Density: 193.0/sq mi (74.51/km^{2})
- Time zone: UTC-4 (EST)
  - Summer (DST): UTC-5 (EDT)
- Area code: 724
- FIPS code: 42-073-76192

Historical population
Census	Pop.	Note	%±
2000	1,198		—
2010	1,052		−12.2%
2020	991		−5.8%
2022 (est.)	977		−1.4%
U.S. Decennial Census

Taylor Township is a township in Lawrence County, Pennsylvania, United States. The population was 991 at the time of the 2020 census, a decline from the figure of 1,052 that was tabulated in 2010.

== Geography ==
According to the United States Census Bureau, the township has a total area of 5.3 square miles (13.9 km^{2}), of which 5.1 square miles (13.2 km^{2}) is land and 0.2 square miles (0.6 km^{2}), or 4.67%, is water.

The township is split in two by the city of New Castle and its exclave borders Union Township.

Unincorporated communities in the township include West Pittsburg, East Moravia, and New Castle Junction.

== Demographics ==
As of the census of 2000, there were 1,198 people, 474 households and 335 families residing in the township.

The population density was 234.9 inhabitants per square mile (90.7/km^{2}). There were 506 housing units at an average density of 99.2 per square mile (38.3/km^{2}).

The racial makeup of the township was 97.58% White, 1.59% African American, 0.33% Native American, 0.33% from other races, and 0.17% from two or more races. Hispanic or Latino of any race were 0.33% of the population.

There were 474 households, out of which 23.4% had children under the age of 18 living with them; 55.1% were married couples living together, 11.4% had a female householder with no husband present, and 29.3% were non-families. 24.7% of all households were made up of individuals, and 12.0% had someone living alone who was 65 years of age or older.

The average household size was 2.38 and the average family size was 2.83.

In the township the population was spread out, with 17.9% under the age of 18, 6.6% from 18 to 24, 24.2% from 25 to 24, 28.0% from 45 to 64, and 23.4% who were 65 years of age or older. The median age was 46 years.

For every 100 females, there were 91.1 males. For every 100 females aged 18 and over, there were 90.0 males.

The median income for a household in the township was $34,511, and the median income for a family was $39,375. Males had a median income of $31,688 compared with that of $19,167 for females.

The per capita income for the township was $15,368.

Roughly 9.7% of families and 12.1% of the population were below the poverty line, including 21.7% of those under age 18 and 7.7% of those age 65 or over.

== Education ==
The New Castle Area School District serves the township.

== Transportation ==
=== Major roads and highways ===
- US 422
- PA 18 (In exclave)
- PA 168
