= Nick DeCarbo =

American football player (1910–1991)

- DeCarbo with the Pittsburgh Pirates

No. 28
- Position: Guard

Personal information
- Born: March 21, 1910; New Castle, Pennsylvania, U.S.
- Died: August 21, 1991 (aged 81); Mayfield Heights, Ohio, U.S.
- Listed height: 5 ft 9 in (1.75 m)
- Listed weight: 185 lb (84 kg)

Career information
- High school: New Castle (Pennsylvania)
- College: Duquesne

Career history
- Pittsburgh Pirates (1933)
- Stats at Pro Football Reference

Nicholas Fred DeCarbo (March 21, 1910 – August 21, 1991) was an American professional football guard who played for the Pittsburgh Pirates of the National Football League (NFL). He played college football at Duquesne University.

== Early life and college ==
Nicholas Fred DeCarbo was born on March 21, 1910, in New Castle, Pennsylvania. He attended New Castle High School in New Castle.

DeCarbo played college football for the Duquesne Dukes of Duquesne University, with his final year being in 1932.

== Professional career ==
DeCarbo signed with the Pittsburgh Pirates of the National Football League in 1933. He played in all 11 games for the Pirates as a guard during the team's inaugural 1933 season. The Pirates finished the year with a 3–6–2 record. DeCarbo wore jersey number 28 while with the Pirates. He stood 5'9" and weighed 185 pounds.

== Personal life ==
DeCarbo died on August 21, 1991, in Mayfield Heights, Ohio.
