= Western Pennsylvania Interscholastic Athletic League =

American athletic association

- Conference: Pennsylvania Interscholastic Athletic Association
- Founded: 1907
- Commissioner: Scott Seltzer, Executive Director
- Region: Western Pennsylvania
- Website: wpial.org

The Western Pennsylvania Interscholastic Athletic League (WPIAL, pronounced /ˈwɪpiəl/) is an interscholastic athletic association in Western Pennsylvania. It is District 7 of the Pennsylvania Interscholastic Athletic Association.

== History ==
The Western Pennsylvania Interscholastic Athletic League (WPIAL) was founded in 1907 by a group of educators from four public and private Pittsburgh schools who sought increased regulation and governance of student athletic eligibility and interscholastic athletic competition. The founding schools in the league included Shady Side Academy, Allegheny Prep, Pittsburgh Fifth Avenue High School, and Pittsburgh Central High School. William R. Crabbe of Shady Side Academy acted as a central force in the formation of the League and served as its first president.

At its inception the league was poorly received by the public and the press, and found it difficult to enforce its rules. However, the league slowly spread throughout the Pittsburgh area. The league controlled the growth to small numbers that they could handle. As such, the only organization absorbed as a whole was the old Allegheny Valley League. Following the local success of WPIAL, the idea was brought to the whole state in 1914 when the Pennsylvania Interscholastic Athletic Association (PIAA) was founded. Within PIAA, WPIAL has been designated as District 7, and since 1982, WPIAL/District 7. Although officially known as District 7, the WPIAL is grandfathered to keep the older name due to it predating the PIAA.

Originally numbering three high schools, WPIAL had a high of 156 participating school as late as the 1981–82 school year. As of October 2012, there are 137 high schools and 148 junior high school members in the WPIAL.

== Member schools ==
The league is responsible for administering the interscholastic athletic participation/competition of public school districts and private schools located in Allegheny (except Pittsburgh Public Schools), Armstrong, Beaver, Butler, Fayette, Greene, Lawrence, Washington, Westmoreland counties in Western Pennsylvania.

Exceptions as of the 2022-23 school year include:

- Slippery Rock Area School District and Moniteau School District in Butler County participate in District 10 and District 9 respectively.
- Wilmington Area School District in Lawrence and Mercer counties participates in District 10.
- Since 2012, four high schools from Pittsburgh Public Schools in Allegheny County, which makes up PIAA District 8, compete in the WPIAL for baseball, softball, soccer, swimming, tennis, golf, and cross country.
- Indiana Area School District, despite being located in Indiana County, which is part of District 6, competes in the WPIAL.

== Sports ==
Note: While some sports are dominated by one sex, there is no rule that mandates sex segregation in PIAA sports, even if a school has teams for each sex.

Fall: Football, Golf, Tennis (girls), Cross Country, Volleyball (girls), Field Hockey, Soccer

Winter: Rifle, Gymnastics, Swimming & Diving, Wrestling, Basketball

Spring: Lacrosse (girls), Tennis (boys), Softball, Baseball, Volleyball (boys), Track & Field

=== Football champions, 2016–present ===
- 2025
  - Class AAAAAA (6A): Central Catholic
  - Class AAAAA (5A): Peters Township
  - Class AAAA (4A): Aliquippa
  - Class AAA (3A): Avonworth
  - Class AA (2A): Seton LaSalle
  - Class A (1A): Clairton
- 2024
  - Class AAAAAA (6A): Central Catholic
  - Class AAAAA (5A): Pine-Richland
  - Class AAAA (4A): Thomas Jefferson
  - Class AAA (3A): Avonworth
  - Class AA (2A): South Park
  - Class A (1A): Fort Cherry
- 2023
  - Class AAAAAA (6A): North Allegheny
  - Class AAAAA (5A): Peters Township
  - Class AAAA (4A): Aliquippa
  - Class AAA (3A): Belle Vernon
  - Class AA (2A): Beaver Falls
  - Class A (1A): Fort Cherry
- 2022
  - Class AAAAAA (6A): North Allegheny
  - Class AAAAA (5A): Pine-Richland
  - Class AAAA (4A): Aliquippa
  - Class AAA (3A): Belle Vernon
  - Class AA (2A): Steel Valley
  - Class A (1A): Union
- 2021
  - Class AAAAAA (6A): Mount Lebanon
  - Class AAAAA (5A): Penn-Trafford
  - Class AAAA (4A): Aliquippa
  - Class AAA (3A): Central Valley
  - Class AA (2A): Serra Catholic
  - Class A (1A): Bishop Canevin
- 2020
  - Class AAAAAA (6A): Central Catholic
  - Class AAAAA (5A): Pine-Richland
  - Class AAAA (4A): Thomas Jefferson
  - Class AAA (3A): Central Valley
  - Class AA (2A): Beaver Falls
  - Class A (1A): Jeannette
- 2019
  - Class AAAAAA (6A): Central Catholic
  - Class AAAAA (5A): Gateway
  - Class AAAA (4A): Thomas Jefferson
  - Class AAA (3A): Central Valley
  - Class AA (2A): Avonworth
  - Class A (1A): Clairton
- 2018
  - Class AAAAAA (6A): Pine-Richland
  - Class AAAAA (5A): Penn Hills
  - Class AAAA (4A): South Fayette
  - Class AAA (3A): Aliquippa
  - Class AA (2A): Steel Valley
  - Class A (1A): Our Lady of the Sacred Heart (OLSH)
- 2017
  - Class AAAAAA (6A): Pine-Richland
  - Class AAAAA (5A): Gateway
  - Class AAAA (4A): Thomas Jefferson
  - Class AAA (3A): Quaker Valley
  - Class AA (2A): Trinity
  - Class A (1A): Jeannette
- 2016
  - Class AAAAAA (6A): Central Catholic
  - Class AAAAA (5A): West Allegheny
  - Class AAAA (4A): Thomas Jefferson
  - Class AAA (3A): Beaver Falls
  - Class AA (2A): Steel Valley
  - Class A (1A): Clairton

=== Boys' basketball champions, 2000–present ===
Class AAAAAA (6A):

- 2026: Upper St. Clair
- 2025: Upper St. Clair
- 2024: Upper St. Clair
- 2023: Central Catholic
- 2022: Fox Chapel
- 2021: Upper St Clair
- 2020: Butler
- 2019: Mt. Lebanon
- 2018: Penn Hills
- 2017: Pine Richland

Class AAAAA (5A):

- 2026: Chartiers Valley
- 2025: Chartiers Valley
- 2024: Moon
- 2023: Penn Hills
- 2022: Laurel Highlands
- 2021: New Castle
- 2020: Laurel Highlands
- 2019: Mars
- 2018: Mars
- 2017: Moon

Class AAAA (4A):

- 2026: Knoch
- 2025: Belle Vernon
- 2024: Lincoln Park
- 2023: Lincoln Park
- 2022: Quaker Valley
- 2021: Lincoln Park
- 2020: Highlands
- 2019: New Castle
- 2018: New Castle
- 2017: New Castle
- 2016: Pine-Richland
- 2015: Mt. Lebanon
- 2014: Mt. Lebanon
- 2013: New Castle
- 2012: Gateway
- 2011: Gateway
- 2010: Mt. Lebanon
- 2009: Peters Township
- 2008: Pittsburgh Central Catholic
- 2007: Bethel Park
- 2006: Mt. Lebanon
- 2005: Upper St. Clair
- 2004: Mt. Lebanon
- 2003: Penn Hills
- 2002: Uniontown
- 2001: Chartiers Valley
- 2000: Penn Hills

Class AAA (3A):

- 2026: Aliquippa
- 2025: South Allegheny
- 2024: Deer Lakes
- 2023: Deer Lakes
- 2022: Shady Side Academy
- 2021: Ellwood City
- 2020: North Catholic
- 2019: Lincoln Park
- 2018: Lincoln Park
- 2017: North Catholic
- 2016: Beaver Falls
- 2015: Indiana
- 2014: Central Valley
- 2013: Montour
- 2012: New Castle
- 2011: Montour
- 2010: Chartiers Valley
- 2009: Hampton Township
- 2008: Blackhawk
- 2007: West Allegheny
- 2006: Moon
- 2005: Moon
- 2004: Moon
- 2003: Blackhawk
- 2002: Steel Valley
- 2001: Brownsville
- 2000: Blackhawk

Class AA (2A):

- 2026: Sewickley Academy
- 2025: Jeannette
- 2024: Aliquippa
- 2023: Aliquippa
- 2022: OLSH
- 2021: OLSH
- 2020: OLSH
- 2019: OLSH
- 2018: Sewickley Academy
- 2017: Sewickley Academy
- 2016: Aliquippa
- 2015: Aliquippa
- 2014: Seton-LaSalle
- 2013: Beaver Falls
- 2012: Beaver Falls
- 2011: Monessen
- 2010: North Catholic
- 2009: North Catholic
- 2008: Jeannette
- 2007: Aliquippa
- 2006: Aliquippa
- 2005: Beaver Falls
- 2004: Aliquippa
- 2003: Aliquippa
- 2002: Sto-Rox
- 2001: Sto-Rox
- 2000: Aliquippa

Class A (1A):

- 2026: The Neighborhood Academy
- 2025: The Neighborhood Academy
- 2024: Imani Christian Academy
- 2023: Imani Christian Academy
- 2022: Bishop Canevin
- 2021: Bishop Canevin
- 2020: Vincentian Academy
- 2019: Nazareth Prep
- 2018: Vincentian Academy
- 2017: Monessen
- 2016: North Catholic
- 2015: Monessen
- 2014: Lincoln Park
- 2013: Vincentian Academy
- 2012: Lincoln Park
- 2011: Vincentian Academy
- 2010: Sewickley Academy
- 2009: Sewickley Academy
- 2008: Serra Catholic
- 2007: Leechburg
- 2006: Clairton
- 2005: Duquesne
- 2004: Sewickley Academy
- 2003: Union Township
- 2002: Monessen
- 2001: Monessen
- 2000: Cornell

=== Girls' basketball championship games, 2001 - present ===
Year	Class	Winner	Defeated	Score	Location
2024	6A	Norwin	North Allegheny	56 - 41	Petersen Events Center
2024	5A	South Fayette	Armstrong	70 - 63	Petersen Events Center
2024	4A	North Catholic	Blackhawk	40 - 37	Petersen Events Center
2024	3A	Shady Side Academy	Avonworth	52 - 45	Petersen Events Center
2024	2A	Greensburg Central Catholic	Serra Catholic	62 - 41	Petersen Events Center
2024	1A	Union Area	St. Joseph	50 - 43	Petersen Events Center
2023	6A	North Allegheny	Upper St. Clair	71 - 45	Petersen Events Center
2023	5A	South Fayette	Oakland Catholic	64 - 49	Petersen Events Center
2023	4A	North Catholic	Blackhawk	51 - 35	Petersen Events Center
2023	3A	Avonworth	Laurel	48 - 40	Petersen Events Center
2023	2A	Shenango	Freedom Area	44 - 34	Petersen Events Center
2023	1A	Union Area	Aquinas Academy	52 - 35	Petersen Events Center
2022	6A	Mt. Lebanon	Upper St. Clair	55 - 44	Petersen Events Center
2022	5A	South Fayette	Chartiers Valley	57 - 48	Petersen Events Center
2022	4A	Blackhawk	Knoch	55 - 35	Petersen Events Center
2022	3A	North Catholic	Freedom Area	48 - 43	Petersen Events Center
2022	2A	Neshannock	OLSH	55 - 31	Petersen Events Center
2022	1A	Bishop Canevin	Aquinas Academy	59 - 40	Petersen Events Center
2021	6A	North Allegheny	Upper St. Clair	70 - 36	Peters Twp. High School
2021	5A	Chartiers Valley	Trinity	62 - 40	Peters Twp. High School
2021	4A	Beaver Area	Quaker Valley	45 - 29	Peters Twp. High School
2021	3A	Mohawk	North Catholic	54 - 48	North Allegheny High School
2021	2A	Neshannock	Serra Catholic	54 - 44	North Allegheny High School
2021	1A	Rochester	West Greene	71 - 41	Peters Twp. High School
2020	6A	North Allegheny	Bethel Park	54 - 40	Petersen Events Center
2020	5A	Chartiers Valley	Trinity	58 - 40	Petersen Events Center
2020	4A	North Catholic	Southmoreland	61 - 44	Petersen Events Center
2020	3A	Mohawk	Beaver Area	44 - 26	Petersen Events Center
2020	2A	Bishop Canevin	Laurel	50 - 41	Petersen Events Center
2020	1A	Rochester	West Greene	59 - 43	Petersen Events Center
2019	6A	Peters Township	North Allegheny	43 - 40	Petersen Events Center
2019	5A	Chartiers Valley	Thomas Jefferson	50 - 44	Petersen Events Center
2019	4A	North Catholic	Central Valley	75 - 57	Petersen Events Center
2019	3A	Neshannock	Shady Side Academy	47 - 42	Petersen Events Center
2019	2A	OLSH	Brentwood	50 - 48	Petersen Events Center
2019	1A	Rochester	West Greene	62 - 56	Petersen Events Center
2018	6A	North Allegheny	Peters Township	79 - 48	Petersen Events Center
2018	5A	Gateway	Oakland Catholic	29 - 27	Petersen Events Center
2018	4A	North Catholic	Beaver Area	50 - 49	Petersen Events Center
2018	3A	Bishop Canevin	East Allegheny	56 - 52	Petersen Events Center
2018	2A	Vincentian Academy	Chartiers-Houston	62 - 47	Petersen Events Center
2018	1A	Winchester Thurston	West Greene	76 - 57	Petersen Events Center
2017	6A	North Allegheny	Bethel Park	50 - 39	Petersen Events Center
2017	5A	Chartiers Valley	Oakland Catholic	52 - 36	Petersen Events Center
2017	4A	North Catholic	Blackhawk	65 - 36	Petersen Events Center
2017	3A	Bishop Canevin	Neshannock	65 - 36	Petersen Events Center
2017	2A	Charties-Houston	Vincentian Academy	47 - 35	Petersen Events Center
2017	1A	Winchester Thurston	Cornell	52 - 41	Petersen Events Center
2016	4A	Norwin	North Allegheny	63 - 57	Petersen Events Center
2016	3A	South Fayette	Trinity	59 - 52	Petersen Events Center
2016	2A	Bishop Canevin	Greensburg C.C.	53 - 33	Petersen Events Center
2016	1A	Vincentian Academy	North Catholic	68 - 54	Petersen Events Center
2015	4A	Norwin	Penn Hills	54 - 34	Petersen Events Center
2015	3A	Blackhawk	South Fayette	65 - 54	Petersen Events Center
2015	2A	Seton LaSalle	Bishop Canevin	51 - 35	Petersen Events Center
2015	1A	Vincentian Academy	North Catholic	74 - 35	Petersen Events Center
2014	4A	Penn-Trafford	Hempfield	56 - 45	A. J. Palumbo Center
2014	3A	Blackhawk	South Park	62 - 55	A. J. Palumbo Center
2014	2A	Seton LaSalle	Burrell	55 - 34	A. J. Palumbo Center
2014	1A	Vincentian Academy	Serra Catholic	66 - 46	A. J. Palumbo Center
2013	4A	Bethel Park	Chartiers Valley	48 - 34	A. J. Palumbo Center
2013	3A	South Park	Elizabeth Forward	50 - 32	A. J. Palumbo Center
2013	2A	Bishop Canevin	Seton LaSalle	56 - 47	A. J. Palumbo Center
2013	1A	Vincentian Academy	Serra Catholic	53 - 46	A. J. Palumbo Center
2012	4A	Mt. Lebanon	Oakland Catholic	58 - 49	A. J. Palumbo Center
2012	3A	Hopewell	South Park	50 - 34	A. J. Palumbo Center
2012	2A	Seton LaSalle	Bishop Canevin	73 - 60	A. J. Palumbo Center
2012	1A	Vincentian Academy	North Catholic	54 - 50	A. J. Palumbo Center
2011	4A	Shaler	Mt. Lebanon	41 - 35	A. J. Palumbo Center
2011	3A	Blackhawk	Ambridge	63 - 49	A. J. Palumbo Center
2011	2A	Seton LaSalle	Jeanette	74 - 29	A. J. Palumbo Center
2011	1A	North Catholic	Fort Cherry	49 - 43	A. J. Palumbo Center
2010	4A	Mt. Lebanon	Baldwin	59 - 43	A. J. Palumbo Center
2010	3A	New Castle	Hopewell	66 - 61	A. J. Palumbo Center
2010	2A	Jeannette	Seton LaSalle	39 - 36	A. J. Palumbo Center
2010	1A	Vincentian Academy	North Catholic	57 - 31	A. J. Palumbo Center
2009	4A	Mt. Lebanon	Fox Chapel	50 - 24	A. J. Palumbo Center
2009	3A	New Castle	West Mifflin	54 - 47	A. J. Palumbo Center
2009	2A	Sto-Rox	Seton LaSalle	51 - 34	A. J. Palumbo Center
2009	1A	North Catholic	Mt. Alvernia	48 - 44	A. J. Palumbo Center
2008	4A	Upper St. Clair	Peters Township	69 - 40	A. J. Palumbo Center
2008	3A	Hampton	West Mifflin	45 - 41	A. J. Palumbo Center
2008	2A	South Park	OLSH	47 - 37	A. J. Palumbo Center
2008	1A	Mt. Alvernia	Monessen	74 - 68	A. J. Palumbo Center
2007	4A	New Castle	Oakland Catholic	46 - 44	A. J. Palumbo Center
2007	3A	Hopewell	Montour	44 - 26	A. J. Palumbo Center
2007	2A	Greensburg C.C.	Ford City	47 - 37	A. J. Palumbo Center
2007	1A	North Catholic	Vincentian Academy	61 - 35	A. J. Palumbo Center
2006	4A	Oakland Catholic	Mt Lebanon	49 - 36	Petersen Events Center
2006	3A	Hopewell	Moon Area	43 - 26	Petersen Events Center
2006	2A	Greensburg C.C.	OLSH	46 - 26	Petersen Events Center
2006	1A	Monessen	Serra Catholic	40 - 34	Petersen Events Center
2005	4A	Oakland Catholic	Bethel Park	58 - 49	A. J. Palumbo Center
2005	3A	Moon	Mountour	33 - 29	A. J. Palumbo Center
2005	2A	Avonworth	Greensburg C.C.	58 - 52	A. J. Palumbo Center
2005	1A	Serra Catholic	Clairton	56 - 31	A. J. Palumbo Center
2004	4A	New Castle	Oakland Catholic	36 - 32	A. J. Palumbo Center
2004	3A	North Catholic	Mars	68 - 40	A. J. Palumbo Center
2004	2A	Carlynton	Freeport	42 - 20	A. J. Palumbo Center
2004	1A	Monessen	Serra Catholic	63 - 47	A. J. Palumbo Center
2003	4A	Upper St. Clair	Oakland Catholic	55 - 45	A. J. Palumbo Center
2003	3A	North Catholic	Moon Area	51 - 42	A. J. Palumbo Center
2003	2A	Greensburg C.C.	Carlynton	49 - 40	A. J. Palumbo Center
2003	1A	Serra Catholic	Monessen	68 - 54	A. J. Palumbo Center
2002	4A	Oakland Catholic	Upper St. Clair	63 - 50	Charles L. Sewall Center
2002	3A	Moon	North Catholic	54 - 44	Charles L. Sewall Center
2002	2A	Vincentian Academy	Greensburg C.C.	55 - 48	Charles L. Sewall Center
2002	1A	Clairton	Mt. Alvernia	52 - 49	Charles L. Sewall Center
2001	4A	Oakland Catholic	Ambridge	66 - 48	A. J. Palumbo Center
2001	3A	West Mifflin	Blackhawk	63 - 53	A. J. Palumbo Center
2001	2A	Vincentian Academy	Washington	62 - 55	A. J. Palumbo Center
2001	1A	Clairton	Monessen	64 - 50	A. J. Palumbo Center

== See also ==
- Chuck Heberling, long-time executive director of WPIAL
