= Henrietta, Pennsylvania =

Unincorporated community in Pennsylvania, US

- Census-designated place
- Location within Pennsylvania Location within the United States
- Coordinates: 40°15′45″N 78°17′52″W
- Country: United States
- State: Pennsylvania
- County: Blair
- Township: North Woodbury

Area
  - Total: 0.65 km^{2} (0.25 sq mi)
  - Land: 0.65 km^{2} (0.25 sq mi)
  - Water: 0.00 km^{2} (0 sq mi)
- Elevation: 427 m (1,401 ft)

Population (2020)
  - Total: 138
  - Density: 212.57/km^{2} (550.6/sq mi)
- Time zone: UTC-5 (Eastern (EST))
  - Summer (DST): UTC-4 (EDT)
- ZIP Code: 16662 (Martinsburg)
- Area codes: 814/582
- FIPS code: 42-33888
- GNIS feature ID: 2805510

Henrietta is an unincorporated community and census-designated place (CDP) in Blair County, Pennsylvania, United States. It was first listed as a CDP prior to the 2020 census.

The CDP is in the southeastern corner of Blair County, in the southeastern corner of North Woodbury Township. It is in the valley of Clover Creek, a northward-flowing tributary of the Frankstown Branch Juniata River, and sits at the western foot of Tussey Mountain. It is 5 miles (8 km) southeast of Martinsburg and 9 miles (14 km) southeast of Roaring Spring.

== Demographics ==
Historical population
Census	Pop.	Note	%±
2020	138		—
U.S. Decennial Census

== Education ==
It is in the Spring Cove School District.
