= Mr. Pennsylvania Football =

- Date: 2010; 16 years ago
- Location: Harrisburg, Pennsylvania, U.S.
- Country: United States
- Presented by: Mr. PA Football Foundation and Sports Recruiters
- Currently held by: Kemon Spell (4A-6A winner); Luca Neal (1A-3A winner)
- Most awards: Tyler Boyd (2); Rushel Shell (2); Julian Fleming (2)

Television/radio coverage
- Network: Pennsylvania Cable Network & WNEP-TV
- Produced by: Awards Banquet produced by Make It Happen Events

Mr. Pennsylvania Football also referred to as Mr. PA Football is an American athletic award given to the most skilled high school football players in Pennsylvania. The award has been given out since 2010 with a two tier format, two players are awarded the award from schools competing in 1A to 3A and another from 4A to 6A.

== Voting process ==
All current high school football players in Pennsylvania are eligible. Nominations are made by the general public, with Nominees progressing through four rounds of online voting. At each stage, fans, the media, and the coaches each represent 1/3 of the vote.

== Mr. PA Football Annual Awards Banquet ==
Held in February or March, the five finalists from each category are invited to attend the annual Awards Banquet in Harrisburg, PA, where the winner is announced for the Mr. PA Football Award, the Lineman's Award, The Michael Payton Quarterback Award, and the Mickey Minnich Legendary Coach Award.

A Division 1 Football Head Coach typically serves as the Keynote Speaker.

=== 2020 and 2021 awards program ===
Because of the ongoing Covid-19 restrictions in Pennsylvania, the 2020 and 2021 awards programs were held online. With segments recorded over several days, the winners were announced in a Live broadcast, and the entire program was posted online. It was also shown several times on Pennsylvania Cable Network.

In 2023, the program returned to its in person format.

== Mr. PA Football Award winners ==
Year	Level	Player	Position	High School	College
2010	A/AA	Desimon Green	DE	Clairton High School	Texas Tech
2010	AAA/AAAA	Rushel Shell	RB	Hopewell High School	West Virginia
2011	A/AA	Tyler Boyd	WR	Clairton High School	Pittsburgh
2011	AAA/AAAA	Rushel Shell (2)	RB	Hopewell High School	West Virginia
2012	A/AA	Tyler Boyd (2)	WR	Clairton High School	Pittsburgh
2012	AAA/AAAA	Robert Foster	WR	Central Valley High School	Alabama
2013	A/AA	DeAndre Scott	RB	Imhotep Institute Charter High School	Arizona State
2013	AAA/AAAA	Andrew Ford	QB	Cedar Cliff High School	Virginia Tech
2014	A/AA	Dominick Bragalone	RB	South Williamsport Area High School	Lehigh
2014	AAA/AAAA	Saquon Barkley	RB	Whitehall High School	Penn State
2015	A/AA	Michael Shuster	QB	Camp Hill High School	Penn State
2015	AAA/AAAA	Miles Sanders	RB	Woodland Hills High School	Penn State
2016	1A-3A	Lamont Wade	DB	Clairton High School	Penn State
2016	4A-6A	D'Andre Swift	RB	St. Joseph's Preparatory School	Georgia
2017	4A-6A	Philip Jurkovec	QB	Pine-Richland High School	Notre Dame
2017	1A-3A	Robert Kennedy	DB	Jeannette City School District	East_Carolina_University
2018	4A-6A	Daequan Hardy	DB	Penn Hills High School	Penn State
2018	1A-3A	Julian Fleming	WR	Southern Columbia Area High School	Ohio State University
2019	4A-6A	Evan Simon	QB	Manheim Central High School	Rutgers University
2019	1A-3A	Julian Fleming (2)	WR	Southern Columbia Area High School	Ohio State
2020	1A-3A	Josh Hough	RB / OLB	Beaver Falls High School	Syracuse University
2020	4A-6A	Kyle McCord	QB	St. Joseph's Preparatory School	Ohio State
2021	4A-6A	Nicholas Singleton	RB	Governor Mifflin Senior High School	Penn State
2021	1A-3A	Gavin Garcia	RB	Southern Columbia Area High School	Kent State University
2022	4A-6A	Stone Saunders	QB	Bishop McDevitt High School (Harrisburg, Pennsylvania)	Kentucky
2022	1A-3A	Jeff Hoenstine	QB	Central High School (Martinsburg, Pennsylvania)	St. Francis University
2023	4A-6A	Rico Scott	WR / S	Bishop McDevitt High School	University of Alabama
2023	4A-6A	Tiqwai Hayes	RB	Aliquippa Junior/Senior High School	Penn State
2023	1A-3A	Alex Erby	QB	Steelton-Highspire School District	United States Naval Academy
2024	4A-6A	Ty Salazer	WR/CB	State College Area High School	Delaware
2024	1A-3A	Eli Zimmerman	RB/WR	Northwestern Lehigh School District	Bloomsburg
2025	4A-6A	Kemon Spell	RB / DB	McKeesport Area High School	Georgia
2025	1A-3A	Luca Neal	ATH / S	Avonworth High School	West Liberty

== Mr. PA Football Lineman Award winners ==
Year	Level	Player	High School	College
2016	4A-6A	Joshua Lugg	North Allegheny	Notre Dame
2016	1A-3A	Donovan Jeter	Beaver Falls High School	Michigan
2017	4A-6A	Micah Parsons	Harrisburg High School	Penn State
2017	1A-3A	Justin Johnson	Neumann-Goretti High School	Oregon
2018	4A-6A	Andrew Kristofic	Pine-Richland High School	Notre Dame
2018	1A-3A	Ja Quay Hubbard	Sharpsville High School	West Virginia
2019	4A-6A	Nicholas Dawkins	Parkland High School	Penn State
2019	1A-3A	Dayon Hayes	Westinghouse High School	Notre Dame
2020	4A-6A	Nolan Rucci	Warwick High School	University of Wisconsin
2020	1A-3A	CJ Dippre	Lakeland High School	University of Maryland
2021	4A-6A	Enai White	Imhotep High School	Texas A&M University
2022	1A-3A	J'Ven Williams	Wyomissing Area High School	Penn State University
2022	4A-6A	Riley Robell	Bishop McDevitt High School	James Madison University
2023	1A-3A	Caleb Brewer	Wyomissing Area High School	Penn State University
2023	4A-6A	Jah'Sear Whittington	Imhotep Charter High School	University of Pittsburgh
2024	1A-3A	Noah Shimko	Mount Carmel Area High School	Maine
2024	4A-6A	Kahlil Stewart	St. Joseph's Preparatory School	Syracuse
2025	1A-3A	Logan Anthony	Palmerton High School	Rutgers
2025	1A-3A	Tavian Branch	Riverside High School	Auburn
2025	4A-6A	Kevin Brown	Harrisburg High School	West Virginia

== Michael Payton Memorial Quarterback Award winners ==
This award, given to a Quarterback, is named in honor of College Football Hall of Fame member Michael Payton, a member of the Board of Advisors, who died in 2018. Recipients have displayed academic, athletic, and moral leadership.

Year	Player	High School	College
2018	Kane Everson	Harrisburg High School	William & Mary
2019	Ricky Ortega	Coatesville High School	Villanova University
2020	Ameer Dudley	Central Valley High School	Harvard University
2021	Beau Pribula	Central York High School	Penn State
2022	Samaj Jones	St. Joseph's Prep High School	Cincinnati
2023	Hayden Johnson	Manheim Township High School	Lehigh University
2024	Stone Saunders	Bishop McDevitt High School	Kentucky
2025	Matt Sieg	Fort Cherry High School	West Virginia

== Mickey Minnich Legendary Coach award winners ==
This award recognizes PA high school football head coaches that have outstanding records and achievements on and off the field. It is named in honor of Coach Mickey Minnich, a long time coach, executive director of the Big 33 Football Game, and founder of Vickie's Angels Foundation.

Year	Legendary Coach	High school(s)	Career win–loss–tie
2011	George Chaump	Central Dauphin, CD East, Harrisburg HS	190–66*
2012	Tim Rimpfel	Cumberland Valley, Bishop McDevitt, Trinity HS	307-100-3
2013	George Curry	Berwick, Wyoming Valley West HS	455-102-5
2014	Mike Williams	Manheim Central High School	348-75-3
2015	Jim Render	Upper St. Clair High School	406-142-6
2016	Mike Pettine	Central Bucks West High School	326-42-4
2017	Joe Hamilton	Blackhawk High School	342-170-11
2018	Jim Roth	Southern Columbia High School	456-63-2
2019	George Novak	Woodlands Hills High School	306-139-3
2020	Jack Henzes	Dunmore & Wyoming Area High School	444-168-8
2021	Terry Verrelli	Wilmington High School	314-129-3
2022	Bob Wolfrum	Wyomissing Area High School	350-87-1
2023	Bob Palko	West Allegheny & Mt. Lebanon High School	248–87
2024	Jim Morgans	Allentown Central, Salisbury, Bethlehem Freedom and Parkland	283-137-1

*Coach Chaump had an additional collegiate coaching record of 71–73–2

== Keynote Speakers and Master of Ceremonies for the Awards Banquet ==
Year	Keynote Speaker	College (at time of speech)	Master of Ceremonies	Organization
2013	Coach Bill O'Brien	Penn State	Josh Wilson	Commonwealth of PA
2014	Coach Randy Edsall	Maryland	Josh Wilson	Commonwealth of PA
2015	Coach James Franklin	Penn State	Jason Bristol	CBS21
2016	Coach Pat Narduzzi	Pittsburgh	Jason Bristol	CBS21
2017	Coach Geoff Collins	Temple	Ross Lippman	ABC27
2018	Coach Chris Ash	Rutgers	Ross Lippman	ABC27
2019	Coach James Franklin	Penn State	Tom Russell	CBS21
2020	Coach Pat Narduzzi	Pittsburgh	Tom Russell	CBS21
2021 Online	Coach Jordan Hill	Trinity High School	Tom Russell	CBS21
2022 Online	Evan Simon (2019), Julian Fleming (2018 & 2019, Michael Shuster (2015), Kyle McCord (2020), Miles Sanders (2015)	Replacing a keynote address, five of the prior winners gave remarks to the finalists.	Tom Russell	CBS21
2023	Coach Pat Flaherty	Rutgers	Tom Russell	CBS21
2024	Coach Mark Ferrante	Villanova	Tom Russell	CBS21
2025	Coach Terry Smith	Penn State	Dennis Owens	ABC27
