= Millerstown =

Millerstown may refer to:

== Places ==
Ireland

- Millerstown, County Westmeath, a townland in the civil parish of Killucan

United States

- Millerstown, Kentucky
- Millerstown, Champaign County, Ohio
- Millerstown, Sandusky County, Ohio
- Millerstown, Pennsylvania, in Perry County
- Millerstown, Blair County, Pennsylvania
- Macungie, Pennsylvania, which was known as Millerstown until officially renamed in 1875
