= Martinsburg Junction, Pennsylvania =

Unincorporated community in Pennsylvania, US

- Census-designated place
- Location within Pennsylvania Location within the United States
- Coordinates: 40°18′36″N 78°20′12″W
- Country: United States
- State: Pennsylvania
- County: Blair
- Township: North Woodbury

Area
  - Total: 0.10 sq mi (0.26 km^{2})
  - Land: 0.10 sq mi (0.26 km^{2})
  - Water: 0 sq mi (0.00 km^{2})
- Elevation: 1,340 ft (410 m)

Population (2020)
  - Total: 35
  - Density: 342.6/sq mi (132.28/km^{2})
- Time zone: UTC-5 (Eastern (EST))
  - Summer (DST): UTC-4 (EDT)
- ZIP Code: 16662 (Martinsburg)
- Area codes: 814/582
- FIPS code: 42-47880
- GNIS feature ID: 2805521

Martinsburg Junction is an unincorporated community and census-designated place (CDP) in Blair County, Pennsylvania, United States. It was first listed as a CDP prior to the 2020 census.

The CDP is in southeastern Blair County, in the northwestern part of North Woodbury Township. It is in the Morrisons Cove region of the county, one-half mile west of the borough of Martinsburg.

== Demographics ==
Historical population
Census	Pop.	Note	%±
2020	35		—
U.S. Decennial Census

== Education ==
It is in the Spring Cove School District.
