= Homewood at Martinsburg, Pennsylvania =

Retirement community in Pennsylvania, US

Homewood at Martinsburg
- Census-designated place
- Location within Pennsylvania Location within the United States
- Coordinates: 40°18′16″N 78°19′57″W
- Country: United States
- State: Pennsylvania
- County: Blair
- Township: North Woodbury

Area
  - Total: 0.073 sq mi (0.19 km^{2})
  - Land: 0.073 sq mi (0.19 km^{2})
  - Water: 0 sq mi (0.00 km^{2})
- Elevation: 1,388 ft (423 m)

Population (2020)
  - Total: 345
  - Density: 4,670.7/sq mi (1,803.37/km^{2})
- Time zone: UTC-5 (Eastern (EST))
  - Summer (DST): UTC-4 (EDT)
- ZIP Code: 16662 (Martinsburg)
- Area codes: 814/582
- FIPS code: 42-35500
- GNIS feature ID: 2807048

Homewood at Martinsburg is a retirement community and census-designated place (CDP) in Blair County, Pennsylvania, United States. It was first listed as a CDP prior to the 2020 census.

The CDP is in southeastern Blair County, in the northwestern part of North Woodbury Township. It is bordered to the east by the borough of Martinsburg and to the north by the Spring Drive Mobile Home Park CDP.

== Demographics ==
Historical population
Census	Pop.	Note	%±
2020	345		—
U.S. Decennial Census

As of the 2020 Census, there were 345 people, 186 households, and 186 housing units. The median age of the population was 84.3. The detailed ancestries reported in 2020 were German (16.5%) and English (15.4%).

Homewood at Martinsburg CDP, Pennsylvania – Racial composition
Race (NH = Non-Hispanic)	% 2020	Pop 2020
White alone (NH)	99.1%	342
Black alone (NH)	0.3%	1
American Indian alone (NH)	0%	0
Asian alone (NH)	0.3%	1
Pacific Islander alone (NH)	0%	0
Other race alone (NH)	0%	0
Multiracial (NH)	0%	0
Hispanic/Latino (any race)	0.3%	1

== Education ==
It is in the Spring Cove School District.
