= Spring Drive Mobile Home Park, Pennsylvania =

Unincorporated community in Pennsylvania, US

Spring Drive Mobile Home Park
- Census-designated place
- Location within Pennsylvania Location within the United States
- Coordinates: 40°18′25″N 78°19′48″W
- Country: United States
- State: Pennsylvania
- County: Blair
- Township: North Woodbury

Area
  - Total: 0.035 sq mi (0.09 km^{2})
  - Land: 0.035 sq mi (0.09 km^{2})
  - Water: 0 sq mi (0.0 km^{2})
- Elevation: 1,368 ft (417 m)
- Time zone: UTC-5 (Eastern (EST))
  - Summer (DST): UTC-4 (EDT)
- ZIP Code: 16662 (Martinsburg)
- Area codes: 814/582
- FIPS code: 42-72988
- GNIS feature ID: 2807057

Spring Drive Mobile Home Park is a mobile home park and census-designated place (CDP) in Blair County, Pennsylvania, United States. It was first listed as a CDP prior to the 2020 census.

The CDP is in southeastern Blair County, in the northwestern part of North Woodbury Township. It is bordered to the east by the borough of Martinsburg and to the south by the Homewood at Martinsburg CDP.

== Education ==
It is in the Spring Cove School District.
