= Curryville, Pennsylvania =

Unincorporated community in Pennsylvania, US

- Unincorporated community
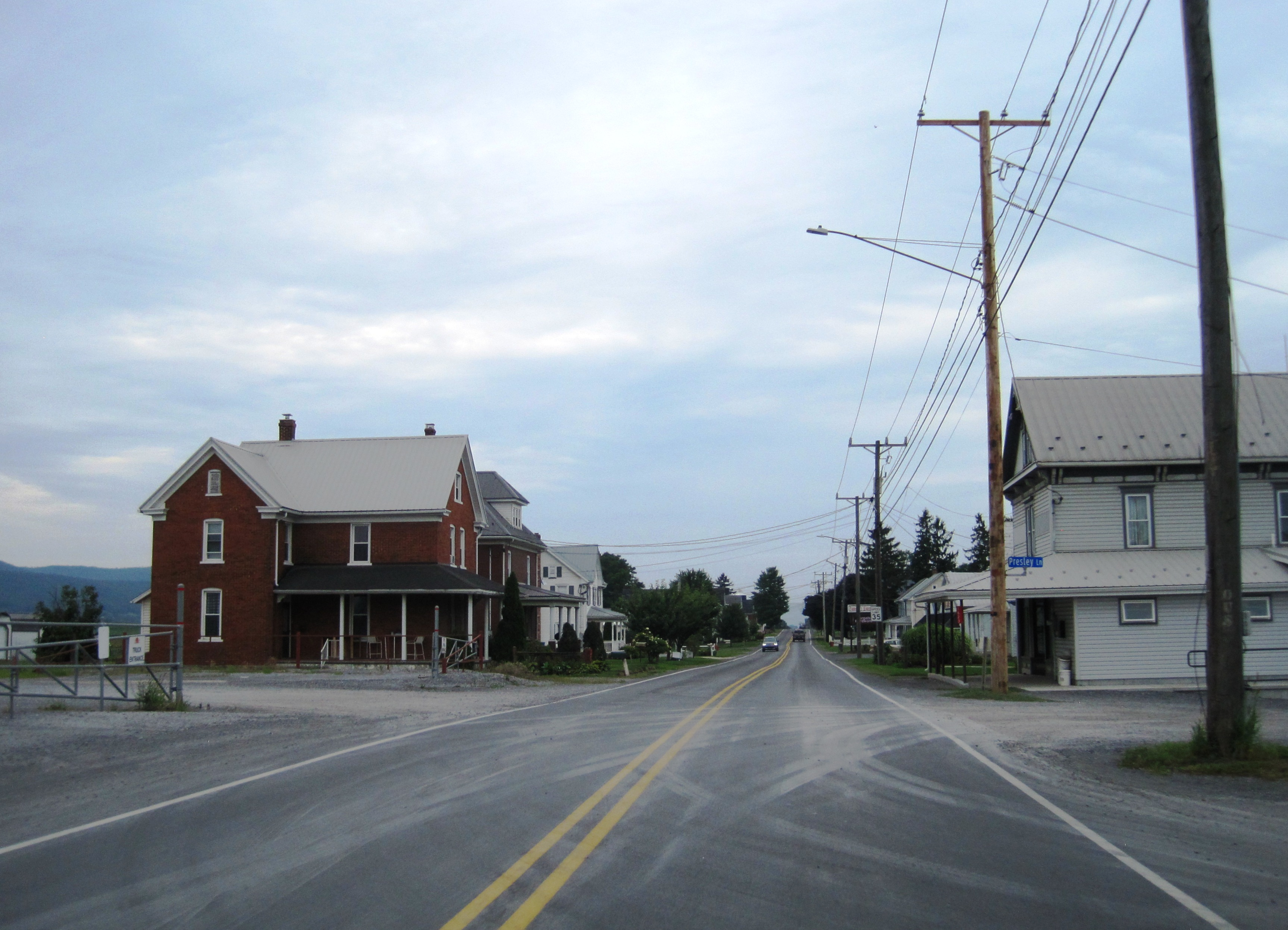
- PA 866 southbound in Curryville

- Location within Pennsylvania
- Coordinates: 40°16′33″N 78°20′17″W
- Country: United States
- State: Pennsylvania
- County: Blair

Area
  - Total: 0.15 sq mi (0.40 km^{2})
  - Land: 0.15 sq mi (0.40 km^{2})
  - Water: 0 sq mi (0.00 km^{2})
- Elevation: 1,427 ft (435 m)

Population (2020)
  - Total: 111
  - Density: 726/sq mi (280.3/km^{2})
- Time zone: UTC-5 (Eastern (EST))
  - Summer (DST): UTC-4 (EDT)
- ZIP code: 16631
- Area code: 814
- GNIS feature ID: 2805483

Curryville is an unincorporated community in North Woodbury Township, Pennsylvania, United States. The community is located along Pennsylvania Route 866, 2.6 miles (4.2 km) south-southwest of Martinsburg. Curryville has a post office with ZIP code 16631.

== Demographics ==
Historical population
Census	Pop.	Note	%±
2020	111		—
U.S. Decennial Census

== Education ==
It is in the Spring Cove School District.
