= Roaring Spring (disambiguation) =

Roaring Spring may refer to:

- Roaring Spring, Kentucky, an unincorporated community in Trigg County
- Roaring Spring, Pennsylvania, a borough in Blair County
  - Roaring Spring Historic District, within the Pennsylvania borough
- Roaring Spring (Gloucester, Virginia), a historic home located near Gloucester, Gloucester County
