= Millerstown, Blair County, Pennsylvania =

Unincorporated community in Pennsylvania, US

Millerstown, Pennsylvania
- Census-designated place
- Location within Pennsylvania Location within the United States
- Coordinates: 40°16′38″N 78°18′10″W
- Country: United States
- State: Pennsylvania
- County: Blair
- Township: North Woodbury

Area
  - Total: 0.15 sq mi (0.39 km^{2})
  - Land: 0.15 sq mi (0.39 km^{2})
  - Water: 0 sq mi (0.00 km^{2})
- Elevation: 1,536 ft (468 m)

Population (2020)
  - Total: 22
  - Density: 147.1/sq mi (56.78/km^{2})
- Time zone: UTC-5 (Eastern (EST))
  - Summer (DST): UTC-4 (EDT)
- ZIP Code: 16662 (Martinsburg)
- Area codes: 814/582
- FIPS code: 42-49704
- GNIS feature ID: 2805525

Millerstown is an unincorporated community and census-designated place (CDP) in Blair County, Pennsylvania, United States. It was first listed as a CDP prior to the 2020 census.

The CDP is in southeastern Blair County, southeast of the center of North Woodbury Township, in the Morrisons Cove region of the county. It is 3 miles (5 km) southeast of the borough of Martinsburg.

Middle Run flows eastward through the northern part of Millerstown. It is a tributary of Clover Creek, a northward-flowing tributary of the Frankstown Branch Juniata River.

== Demographics ==
Historical population
Census	Pop.	Note	%±
2020	22		—
U.S. Decennial Census

== Education ==
It is in the Spring Cove School District.
