= Rolland E. Brumbaugh =

American football player and coach (1885–1922)

Biographical details
- Born: November 9, 1885; Roaring Spring, Pennsylvania, U.S.
- Died: October 20, 1922 (aged 36); Escambia County, Florida, U.S.

Playing career

Football
- 1903–1906: Gettysburg

Baseball
- 1904–1907: Gettysburg

Coaching career (HC unless noted)

Football
- 1907: Lake Forest
- 1908: Gettysburg

Head coaching record
- Overall: 10–3–1

Rolland Edward Brumbaugh (November 9, 1885 – October 20, 1922) was an American football player and coach. He served as the head football coach at Lake Forest College in Lake Forest, Illinois in 1907, and at his alma mater, Gettysburg College, in 1908, compiling a career college football coaching record of 10–3–1.

== Head coaching record ==
Year	Team	Overall	Conference	Standing	Bowl/playoffs
Lake Forest Foresters (Independent) (1907)
1907	Lake Forest	4–1–1			
Lake Forest:		4–1–1			
Gettysburg (Independent) (1908)
1908	Gettysburg	6–2			
Gettysburg:		6–2			
Total:		10–3–1			
