= Robert Kennedy (Canadian football) =

American gridiron football player (born 1999)

- Kennedy with the Montreal Alouettes in 2026

No. 1 – Montreal Alouettes
- Position: Defensive back
- Roster status: Active
- CFL status: American

Personal information
- Born: September 30, 1999 (age 27)
- Listed height: 5 ft 10 in (1.78 m)
- Listed weight: 191 lb (87 kg)

Career information
- High school: Jeannette (Jeannette, Pennsylvania)
- College: Lackawanna (2018–2019); East Carolina (2020); Old Dominion (2021–2022); NC State (2023)
- NFL draft: 2024: undrafted

Career history
- Los Angeles Chargers (2024)*; Hamilton Tiger-Cats (2024)*; Montreal Alouettes (2025–present)
- * Offseason or practice squad member only

Awards and highlights
- CFL East All-Star (2026)
- Stats at CFL.ca

Robert Lee Kennedy III (born September 30, 1999) is an American professional football defensive back for the Montreal Alouettes of the Canadian Football League (CFL). He played college football at Lackawanna, East Carolina, Old Dominion, and NC State.

== Early life ==
Robert Lee Kennedy III was born on September 30, 1999. He played high school football at Jeannette High School in Jeannette, Pennsylvania, where he was a four-year letterman from 2014 to 2017. He was a two-way player in high school, starting at slotback on offense and cornerback on defense. Kennedy also spent some time at quarterback. He was named Mr. Pennsylvania Football his senior year in 2017 after making 12 interceptions while leading Jeannette to a 16–1 overall record, the WPIAL title, and the PIAA 1A state championship. Jeannette had a 50–7 record during Kennedy's four years there. He was also a letterman in basketball.

== College career ==
=== Lackawanna ===
Kennedy was lightly recruited out of high school due to poor grades. He first played college football at Lackawanna College from 2018 to 2019. He played in ten games as a true freshman in 2018, recording 19 solo tackles, seven assisted tackles, three interceptions, six pass breakups, one sack, one forced fumble, and one fumble recovery. He helped Lackawanna go undefeated with an 11–0 record during the 2018 season.

Kennedy was a starting safety in 2019, appearing in 11 games while totaling 23 solo tackles, 11 assisted tackles, four interceptions, nine pass breakups, 3.5 sacks, two forced fumbles, and one fumble recovery. Lackawanna advanced to the 2019 NJCAA National Football Championship, but lost 24–13 to Mississippi Gulf Coast.

=== East Carolina ===
In 2020, Kennedy transferred to play for the East Carolina Pirates of East Carolina University. He played in five games during the COVID-19 shortened 2020 season, posting eight solo tackles, five assisted tackles, and three pass breakups.

=== Old Dominion ===
In 2021, Kennedy transferred again, this time to play for the Old Dominion Monarchs of Old Dominion University. He appeared in two games during the 2021 season, making two assisted tackles, before being redshirted due to injury.

Kennedy played in 11 games, all starts at safety, for the Monarchs in 2022, totaling 33 solo tackles, 19 assisted tackles, one interception, six pass breakups, two forced fumbles, and one fumble recovery that was returned for a 25-yard touchdown. He graduated from Old Dominion.

=== NC State ===
In 2023, Kennedy transferred once again, this time to North Carolina State University to play for the NC State Wolfpack. He started all 13 games at nickelback, recording 13 solo tackles, 20 assisted tackles, two interceptions for 57 yards and one touchdown, four pass breakups, 1.5 sacks, two forced fumbles, and one fumble recovery.

== Professional career ==
Pre-draft measurables
Height	Weight	Arm length	Hand span	Wingspan	40-yard dash	10-yard split	20-yard split	20-yard shuttle	Three-cone drill	Vertical jump	Broad jump	Bench press
5 ft 9 1/8 in (1.76 m)	192 lb (87 kg)	30 5/8 in (0.78 m)	9 1/4 in (0.23 m)	6 ft 1 5/8 in (1.87 m)	4.59 s	1.55 s	2.57 s	4.28 s	7.00 s	37.0 in (0.94 m)	10 ft 5 in (3.18 m)	20 reps
All values from Pro Day

After going undrafted in the 2024 NFL draft, Kennedy signed with the Los Angeles Chargers on May 10, 2024. He made a game-sealing interception in the end zone during the Chargers final preseason game, a 26–19 victory over the Dallas Cowboys. He also posted four solo tackles and three assisted tackles during the game. Kennedy was waived on August 27, and signed to the practice squad the next day. He was released on August 29, 2024.

Kennedy was signed to the practice roster of the Hamilton Tiger-Cats of the Canadian Football League (CFL) on September 20, 2024. He was released on October 5, 2024.

Kennedy signed a two-year contract with the CFL's Montreal Alouettes on January 8, 2025. He was moved to the practice roster on June 1, promoted to the active roster on July 16, moved back to the practice roster on July 22, promoted to the active roster again on July 25, and moved to the one-game injured list on August 20, 2025.
