= North Woodbury Township, Pennsylvania =

Township in Pennsylvania, US

Coordinates: 40°14′56″N 78°17′29″W

- Township
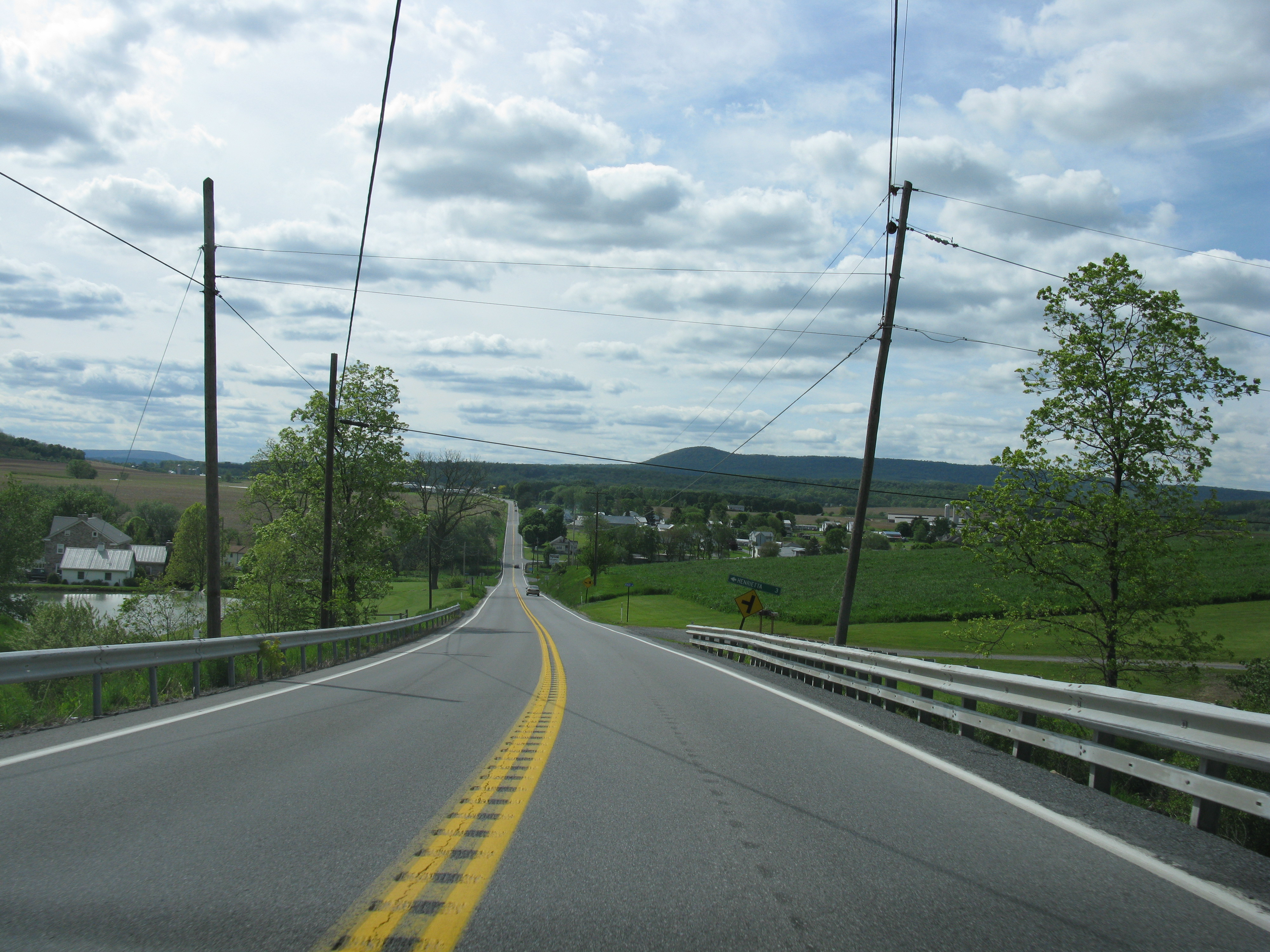
- North Woodbury Township along PA 164 westbound

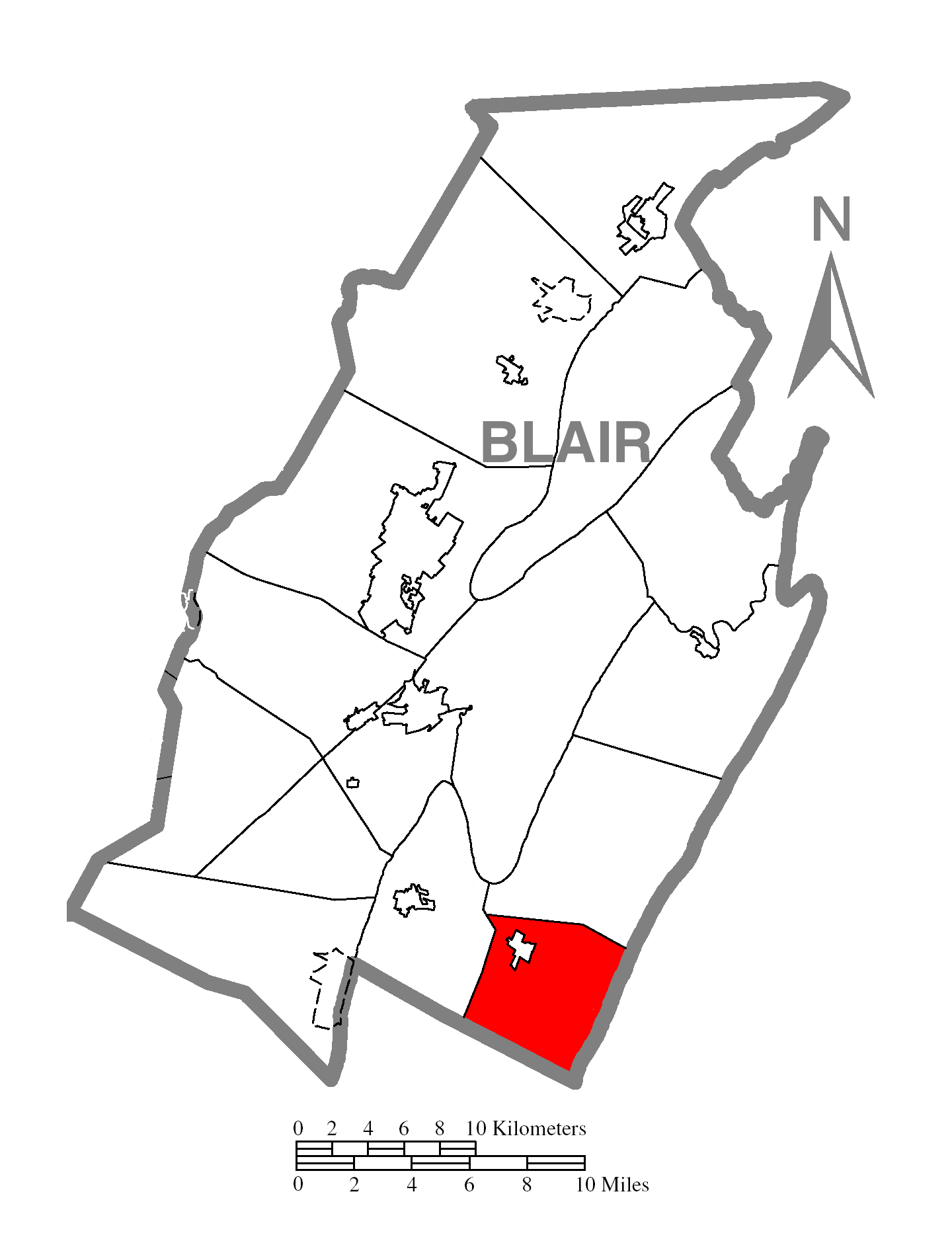
- Map of Blair County, Pennsylvania highlighting North Woodbury Township

- Map of Blair County, Pennsylvania
- Country: United States
- State: Pennsylvania
- County: Blair
- Settled: 1754
- Incorporated: 1771

Government
  - Type: Board of Supervisors

Area
  - Total: 21.07 sq mi (54.58 km^{2})
  - Land: 21.07 sq mi (54.58 km^{2})
  - Water: 0 sq mi (0.00 km^{2})

Population (2020)
  - Total: 2,434 ▼
  - Estimate (2022): 2,409
  - Density: 125.9/sq mi (48.61/km^{2})
- Time zone: UTC-5 (Eastern (EST))
  - Summer (DST): UTC-4 (EDT)
- Area code: 814
- FIPS code: 42-013-55592

North Woodbury Township is a township in Blair County, Pennsylvania, United States. It is part of the Altoona, PA Metropolitan Statistical Area. The population was 2,434 at the 2020 census.

== Geography ==
North Woodbury Township is located in the southeastern corner of Blair County, with Bedford County to the south and east, and a small portion of Huntingdon County to the northeast. The township completely surrounds the borough of Martinsburg. Census-designated places in the township include Fredericksburg (also known as "Clover Creek"), Millerstown, Henrietta, Curryville, Martinsburg Junction, Spring Drive Mobile Home Park, and Homewood at Martinsburg.

According to the United States Census Bureau, the township has a total area of 20.8 square miles (53.9 km^{2}), all land.

North Woodbury Township is to the south of Woodbury Township, Blair County. This geographical quirk is because the township was formerly part of Bedford County, and is indeed north of Woodbury Township, Bedford County. The eastern border of the township follows the ridgecrest of Tussey Mountain.

== Recreation ==
A portion of Pennsylvania State Game Lands Number 73 is located on the eastern border of the township.

== Demographics ==
Historical population
Census	Pop.	Note	%±
2010	2,644		—
2020	2,434		−7.9%
2022 (est.)	2,409		−1.0%
U.S. Decennial Census

As of the census of 2000, there were 2,276 people, 886 households, and 649 families residing in the township. The population density was 109.4 inhabitants per square mile (42.2/km^{2}). There were 919 housing units at an average density of 44.2 per square mile (17.1/km^{2}). The racial makeup of the township was 99.38% White, 0.18% African American, 0.04% Asian, and 0.40% from two or more races. Hispanic or Latino of any race were 0.26% of the population.

There were 886 households, out of which 31.7% had children under the age of 18 living with them, 64.8% were married couples living together, 5.3% had a female householder with no husband present, and 26.7% were non-families. 24.2% of all households were made up of individuals, and 14.2% had someone living alone who was 65 years of age or older. The average household size was 2.57 and the average family size was 3.07.

In the township the population was spread out, with 25.2% under the age of 18, 8.1% from 18 to 24, 25.7% from 25 to 44, 24.7% from 45 to 64, and 16.3% who were 65 years of age or older. The median age was 39 years. For every 100 females, there were 96.5 males. For every 100 females age 18 and over, there were 95.7 males.

The median income for a household in the township was $37,229, and the median income for a family was $44,153. Males had a median income of $30,142 versus $24,028 for females. The per capita income for the township was $17,386. About 5.3% of families and 8.1% of the population were below the poverty line, including 8.5% of those under age 18 and 10.4% of those age 65 or over.
