= Dayon Hayes =

American football player (born 2001)

No. 50 – Texas A&M Aggies
- Position: Defensive end
- Class: Graduate student

Personal information
- Born: August 26, 2001 (age 25)
- Listed height: 6 ft 3 in (1.91 m)
- Listed weight: 260 lb (118 kg)

Career information
- High school: Westinghouse (Pittsburgh, Pennsylvania)
- College: Pittsburgh (2020–2023); Colorado (2024); Texas A&M (2025)

Awards and highlights
- Mr. PA Football Lineman (2019)
- Stats at ESPN

Dayon Hayes (born August 26, 2001) is an American college football defensive end for the Texas A&M Aggies. He previously played for the Pittsburgh Panthers and the Colorado Buffaloes.

== Early life ==
Hayes attended Westinghouse High School in Pittsburgh, Pennsylvania. He was rated as a four-star recruit and committed to play college football for the Pittsburgh Panthers.

== College career ==
=== Pittsburgh ===
In his first collegiate game in the 2020 season opener, Hayes notched two sacks and forced fumble in a 55-0 win over Austin Peay. In his first three collegiate seasons from 2020 to 2022, he totaled 36 tackles with 16 being for a loss, eight sacks, a pass deflection, and a forced fumble in 27 games. In 2023, Hayes played in all 12 games with 11 starts for the Panthers, where he notched 45 tackles with 11 being for a loss, four sacks, four pass deflections, and a forced fumble. After the season, he entered his name into the NCAA transfer portal.

=== Colorado ===
Hayes transferred to play for the Colorado Buffaloes. In week 3 of the 2024 season, he notched two and a half tackles for a loss, and two sacks in a win over rival Colorado State. On December 10, 2024, Hayes announced that he would enter the transfer portal for the second time.

=== Texas A&M ===
On December 20, 2024, Hayes announced that he would transfer to Texas A&M.
