= Saquon Barkley =

American football player (born 1997)

- Barkley in 2024

No. 26 – Philadelphia Eagles
- Position: Running back
- Roster status: Active

Personal information
- Born: February 9, 1997 (age 29); The Bronx, New York, U.S.
- Listed height: 6 ft 0 in (1.83 m)
- Listed weight: 233 lb (106 kg)

Career information
- High school: Whitehall (Whitehall Township, Pennsylvania)
- College: Penn State (2015–2017)
- NFL draft: 2018: 1st round, 2nd overall pick

Career history
- New York Giants (2018–2023); Philadelphia Eagles (2024–present)

Awards and highlights
- Super Bowl champion (LIX); NFL Offensive Player of the Year (2024); NFL Offensive Rookie of the Year (2018); First-team All-Pro (2024); 3× Pro Bowl (2018, 2022, 2024); NFL rushing yards leader (2024); Bert Bell Award (2024); PFWA All-Rookie Team (2018); 95th greatest New York Giant of all-time; Paul Hornung Award (2017); Consensus All-American (2017); Third-team All-American (2016); 2× Big Ten Most Valuable Player (2016, 2017); 2× Big Ten Offensive Player of the Year (2016, 2017); 2× Big Ten Running Back of the Year (2016, 2017); Big Ten Return Specialist of the Year (2017); 2× First-team All-Big Ten (2016, 2017); Second-team All-Big Ten (2015); NFL records: Receptions by a running back in a rookie season: 91; Scrimmage yards in a single season (regular season & post-season combined): 2,857; Rushing yards in a single season (regular season & post-season combined): 2,504; Most successful two-point conversion attempts: 7 (tied with Marshall Faulk, Alvin Kamara and Zach Ertz)

Career NFL statistics as of Week 9, 2026
- Rushing yards: 8,652
- Rushing average: 4.6
- Rushing touchdowns: 58
- Receptions: 365
- Receiving yards: 2,692
- Receiving touchdowns: 16
- Stats at Pro Football Reference

Saquon Rasul Quevis Barkley (/ˈseɪkwɒn/ SAY-kwon; born February 9, 1997) is an American professional football running back for the Philadelphia Eagles of the National Football League (NFL). He played college football for the Penn State Nittany Lions, where he set several school records for his offensive production over three seasons before forgoing his senior year to enter the NFL.

In 2017, Barkley finished fourth in Heisman Trophy voting with 304 votes, third in Maxwell Award voting, and received multiple national and Big Ten Conference awards and recognition. During his three-year collegiate career, Barkley set Penn State records for most all-purpose career yards (5,538), most career rushing touchdowns (43), most career receiving yards by a running back (1,157), most rushing yards by a freshman and sophomore, and most total yards in a single game.

Barkley was selected second overall by the New York Giants in the 2018 NFL draft, setting several NFL and team records en route to making the 2018 Pro Bowl and being named the NFL Offensive Rookie of the Year. He confronted injuries in the 2020 season, but was again named to the Pro Bowl in 2022. A free agent following the 2023 season, Barkley signed a three-year deal with the Eagles, setting numerous franchise records and rushing for over 2,000 yards in his first season with the team, along with helping Philadelphia win Super Bowl LIX and being named AP NFL Offensive Player of the Year. During the team's Super Bowl LIX win, Barkley broke the record for most rushing yards in one season, previously held by Terrell Davis.

== Early life ==
Barkley was born in the Bronx, New York, the son of Alibay Barkley, a boxer, and Tonya Johnson. He has three brothers and two sisters. His brother Alibay Jr. was a baseball player drafted by the Los Angeles Angels, and his great uncle is former WBC middleweight champion Iran Barkley.

In 2001, Barkley and his family moved to Bethlehem, Pennsylvania, in the Lehigh Valley, in search of a safer and more suburban environment. The family later moved to neighboring Allentown and, in 2005, to Coplay, Pennsylvania.

Barkley attended Whitehall High School in Whitehall Township, Pennsylvania, which competes in the Eastern Pennsylvania Conference, an elite division of large high schools in the Lehigh Valley and Poconos known nationally for producing a large number of NFL and other professional athletes.

At Whitehall High School, Barkley rushed for 3,646 yards with 63 touchdowns from his sophomore to senior year, including 1,856 yards and 31 touchdowns as a senior. Barkley was rated as a four-star recruit and committed to Penn State to play college football. He originally committed to Rutgers before changing to Penn State.

In 2014, Barkley was co-winner of the annual Mr. Pennsylvania Football award for the state's top player in divisions AAA/AAAA. His co-winner at the A/AA level was Dominick Bragalone.

In addition to football, Barkley also lettered in basketball and track and field at Whitehall. As a senior in 2015, he won Eastern Pennsylvania Conference gold medals in both the 100-meter dash (11.15 seconds) and in the long jump (22 ft 2.5 in (6.769 m) at the PIAA District 11 meet, where he also earned a second-place finish in the 100-meter dash with a time of 10.90 seconds, which set a Whitehall High School record. Later in the track and field season, Barkley set personal best marks of 46 ft 2.5 in (14.084 m) in the shot put and 6 ft 0 in (1.83 m) in the high jump.

Barkley was considered a top NCAA Division I football prospect and received multiple football scholarship offers, including from Missouri, North Carolina, Notre Dame, Ohio State, Pitt, Rutgers, Syracuse, and Temple. He chose to accept an offer from Penn State.

College recruiting
Name	Hometown	School	Height	Weight	40^{‡}	Commit date
Saquon Barkley; RB	Coplay, Pennsylvania	Whitehall HS	5 ft 11 in (1.80 m)	233 lb (106 kg)	4.66	Feb 19, 2014
Saquon Barkley; RB	Recruit ratings: Scout: Rivals: 247Sports: (80)					
Overall recruit ranking:
‡ Refers to 40-yard dash; Note: In many cases, Scout, Rivals, 247Sports, On3, and ESPN may conflict in their listings of height, weight and 40 time.; In these cases, the average was taken. ESPN grades are on a 100-point scale.; Sources: "2013 Team Ranking". Rivals.com.

On September 10, 2021, Whitehall High School retired Barkley's jersey number (#21). Earlier, the school had retired the jersey numbers of two other alumni who went on to have successful NFL careers: Matt Millen, who played from 1980 until 1991 with the Oakland and Los Angeles Raiders, the San Francisco 49ers, and the Washington Redskins; and Dan Koppen, who played from 2003 until 2013 with the New England Patriots and Denver Broncos.

== College career ==
=== Freshman year ===
At Penn State, Barkley earned immediate playing time as a true freshman in 2015. After rushing for one yard on one carry during his first game, he rushed for 115 yards with a touchdown in his second game against Buffalo. He followed up that performance by rushing for 195 yards and two touchdowns on 21 carries in his third game against Rutgers. In October, he missed two games due to injury.

In his first game back against top-ranked Ohio State on October 17, 2015, he rushed for 194 yards on 26 carries. During his freshman year at Penn State in 2015, Barkley rushed for 1,076 yards on 182 carries.

During the offseason, Barkley received praise for his freshman year performance and was awarded second-team All-Big Ten with some votes for first team status and being named BTN.com Freshman of the Year.

=== Sophomore year ===
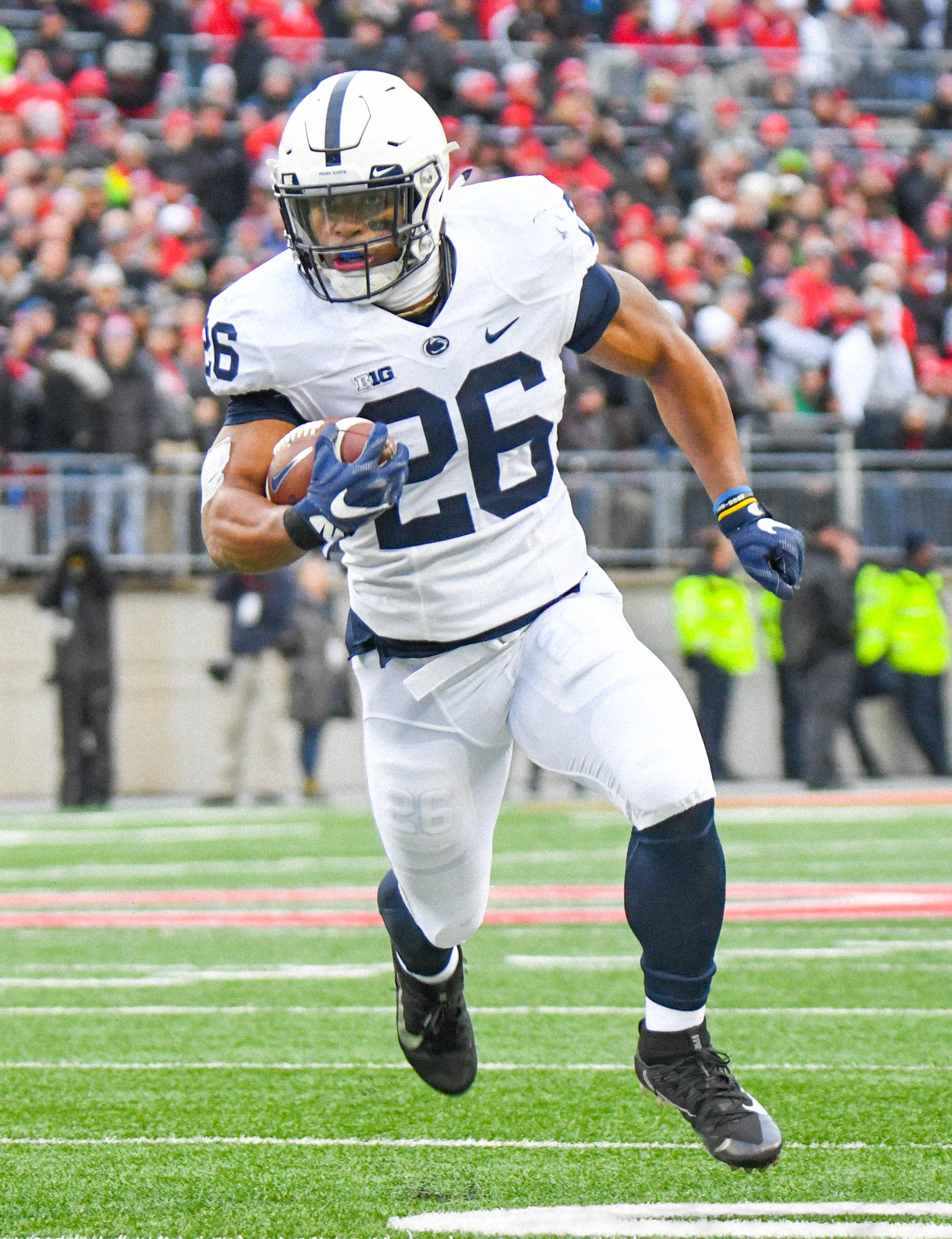
Barkley with Penn State against Ohio State at Ohio Stadium in October 2017

In the first game of his sophomore year at Penn State in 2016, Barkley rushed for 105 yards and a touchdown in a 33–13 win over Kent State. In week two, in a renewed rivalry game against Pitt, Penn State trailed in the second quarter 28–7 before Barkley led Penn State back, scoring five touchdowns with his fifth coming with 5:00 left in the fourth quarter, to bring the Nittany Lions within three points. However, quarterback Trace McSorley threw an interception in the Pitt end zone with 1:41 left that denied the Nittany Lions' hopes of completing the comeback. In week five against Minnesota, in what would become a recurring theme for the 2016 Penn State football team, Penn State again was forced to come back from a halftime deficit. In overtime, after being held to only 38 yards on 19 carries during regular playing time, Barkley's first play in overtime, a 25-yard touchdown run, gave Penn State the victory.

In week six against Maryland, Barkley had his first ever 200-yard rushing game at Penn State, finishing with 31 carries for 202 yards and one touchdown. In week seven, in a matchup versus Ohio State, Barkley rushed for 99 yards on 12 carries with one 37-yard run in a 24–21 win over the second ranked Buckeyes. In week eight, Barkley and no. 24 Penn State scored a season high 62 points versus Purdue as Barkley rushed for a career-high 207 yards and a career-high long 81-yard run, along with 70 yards in receiving yards and two touchdowns, giving him a total of 277 yards in the game. Penn State defeated Purdue 62–24 and improved to 6–2 and 4–1 in Big Ten play.

On November 1, 2016, Barkley was named a semi-finalist for the Maxwell Award, granted to the all-around best collegiate football player of the year. On November 5, Barkley rushed for 167 yards and a touchdown against Iowa. He added 44 yards and another touchdown in receiving for a total of 211 all-purpose yards in Penn State's 41–14 victory.

After the regular season, Barkley was named the Big Ten Offensive Player of the Year, Ameche–Dayne Running Back of the Year and First Team All-Big Ten.

On December 3, 2016, Barkley had 19 carries for 83 yards, rushed for a touchdown, and caught another touchdown on a wheel route. His efforts helped Penn State recover from a 28–7 deficit to stun Wisconsin, 38–31, in the 2016 Big Ten Championship Game.

In the 2017 Rose Bowl on January 2, Barkley had 25 carries for 194 yards, averaging 7.8 yards per carry, including a 79-yard rushing touchdown that gave Penn State a 28–27 lead. After trailing 13–0, Penn State scored seven touchdowns on seven consecutive possessions, including four touchdowns on four consecutive offensive plays, including Barkley's 79-yard touchdown. Barkley scored the first, fourth, and seventh touchdowns for Penn State, giving the Nittany Lions a 49–35 lead in the fourth quarter, though USC ultimately went on to win the game, 52–49.

At the close of his sophomore year at Penn State, Barkley had set Penn State records for most rushing yards in a season by a freshman (1,076) and by a sophomore (1,496).

=== Junior year ===
In the first game of the 2017 season against Akron, Barkley ran 14 times for 172 yards, two rushing touchdowns, and a long run of 80 yards. He also caught two passes for 54 receiving yards. For his efforts, Barkley was named co-Big Ten Offensive Player of the Week.

In Penn State's 2017 Big Ten opener, at Iowa, Barkley led Penn State to a 21–19 win, recording 358 all-purpose yards. He also set a school record for most all-purpose yards in a single game, recording 211 rushing yards, a rushing touchdown, 94 receiving yards, and 53 kick return yards. For his efforts, Barkley was again named Big Ten Offensive Player of the Week.

In the first Big Ten home game of his junior year against the Indiana, Barkley rushed 20 times for just 56 yards, an unusually underwhelming rushing day for him. Despite this, he still had a major impact on the game, returning the opening kickoff 97 yards for a touchdown, catching four passes for 52 yards, and throwing a 16-yard pass to receiver DaeSean Hamilton late in the fourth quarter to cap a 45–14 Penn State win. This made Barkley the first player in Big Ten history to record a return and passing touchdown in the same game. Barkley was named Big Ten Special Teams Player of the Week. One month later against Ohio State, Barkley again returned the opening kickoff back 97 yards for a touchdown, but was limited for the rest of the game recording 44 rushing yards on 21 carries, 36 of which came on a touchdown run in the second quarter. In his final collegiate game at Penn State, Barkley rushed for 137 yards and scored two touchdowns, one of them a 92-yard effort to put Penn State up 28–7 over the Washington Huskies in the 2017 Fiesta Bowl, which Penn State went on to win 35–28. On December 31, 2017, following Penn State's Fiesta Bowl victory, Barkley declared his intention to forgo his senior year at Penn State and enter the 2018 NFL draft.

== Professional career ==
=== Pre-draft ===
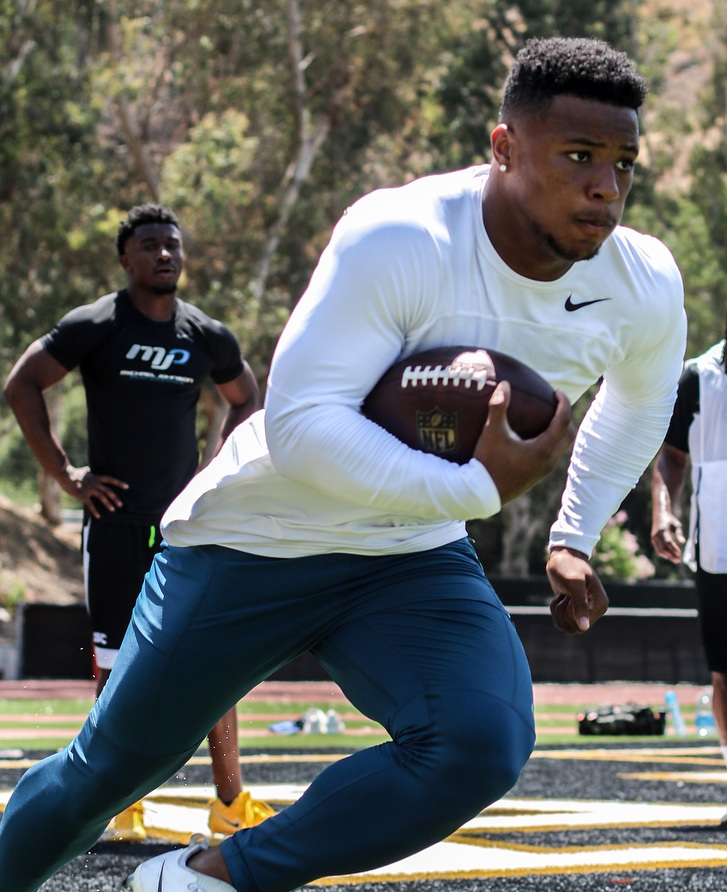
Barkley during New York Giants training camp in July 2018

Entering the 2018 NFL draft, Barkley was widely projected to be a top 10 NFL pick. In the weeks leading up to the NFL Combine, Barkley's stock rose even higher. By late February 2018, some mock drafts projected him as high as the second selection overall, the highest for a running back since Reggie Bush in 2006. ESPN analyst Mel Kiper Jr., who has history of not supporting the selection of running backs in the NFL draft's first round, said "Barkley is a once in a lifetime talent; teams that pass on this young man will be sorry."

At the combine, Barkley had a performance that was widely praised, running a 4.4 second 40-yard dash and doing 29 bench presses of 225 pound weight, tying for the most reps by any running back at this combine. According to NFL analyst Ian Rapoport, the Cleveland Browns were "strongly considering" drafting Barkley first overall, which would have made him the first running back since Ki-Jana Carter in 1995–also of Penn State—to be selected first overall.

Pre-draft measurables
Height	Weight	Arm length	Hand span	Wingspan	40-yard dash	10-yard split	20-yard split	20-yard shuttle	Vertical jump	Bench press
6 ft 0 in (1.83 m)	233 lb (106 kg)	31 3/8 in (0.80 m)	9 1/2 in (0.24 m)	6 ft 2 1/4 in (1.89 m)	4.40 s	1.54 s	2.57 s	4.24 s	41 in (1.04 m)	29 reps
All values from NFL Combine Highlights of Barkley's performance on YouTube

=== New York Giants ===
==== 2018 season ====
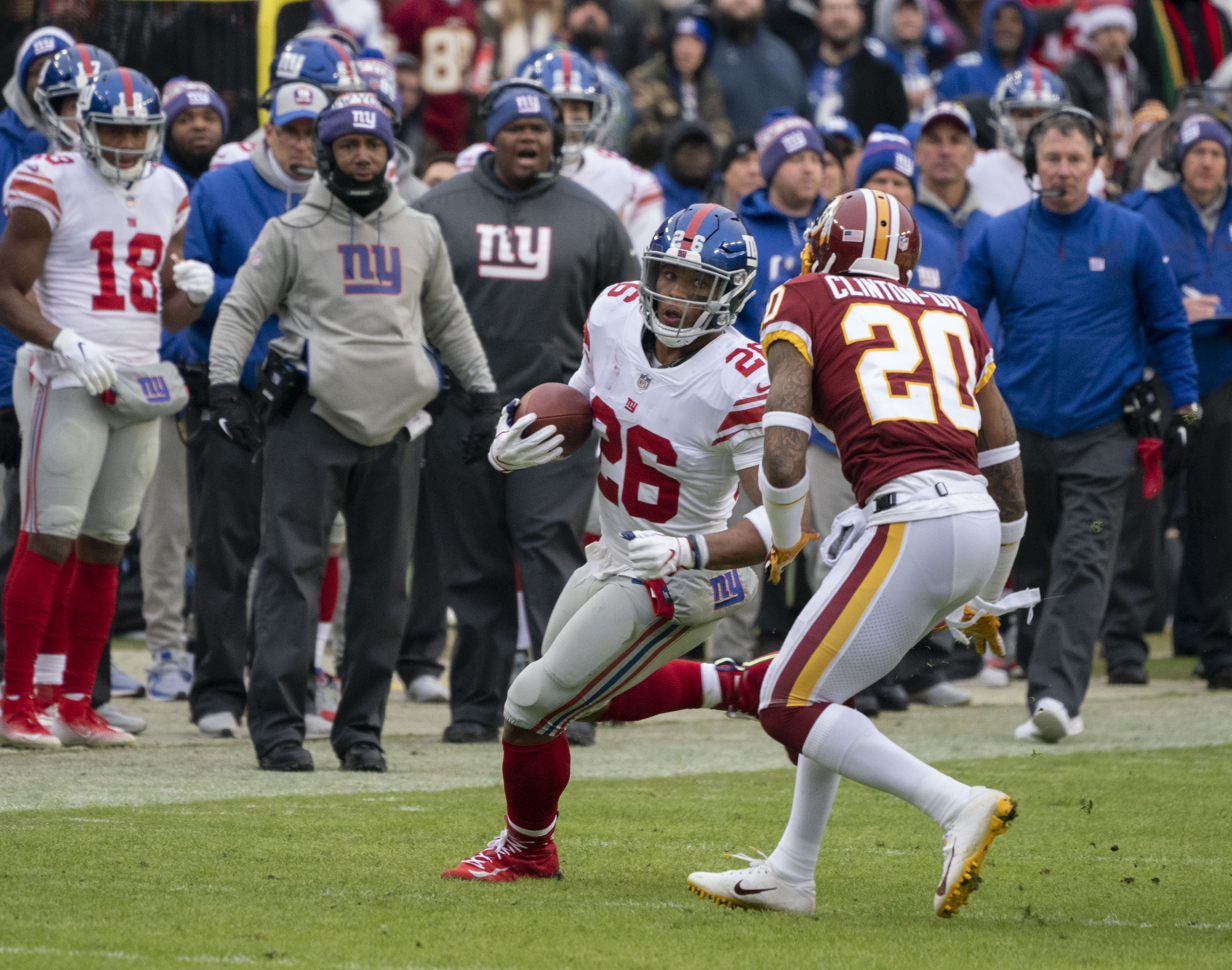
Barkley with the New York Giants against the Washington Redskins at FedEx Field in December 2018

Barkley was selected by the New York Giants with the second overall selection in the 2018 draft. On July 22, 2018, Barkley signed a four-year rookie contract, worth $31.2 million fully guaranteed.

Barkley scored his first NFL touchdown, a 68-yard rush, in the season opener against the Jacksonville Jaguars. Overall in his first NFL game, he rushed for 106 yards and scored a touchdown in the Giants' 20–15 loss. The following week, in a 20–13 loss to the Dallas Cowboys, Barkley recorded 14 receptions, setting a Giants' all-time franchise record for most catches in a game. He also tied the NFL single game record for most catches in a game by an NFL rookie. In Week 3, in the Giants' 27–22 victory over the Houston Texans, Barkley recorded 82 rushing yards, rushed for a touchdown, and caught five passes for 35 receiving yards. The following week, in the Giants' loss to the New Orleans Saints, Barkley recorded 100 scrimmage yards with 44 rushing yards and 56 receiving yards and a rushing touchdown. In Week 5, against the Carolina Panthers, he recorded four receptions for 81 receiving yards and two receiving touchdowns and rushed for 48 yards in the Giants' 33–31 loss. In the Giants' Week 6 Thursday Night Football game against the Philadelphia Eagles, Barkley finished with 130 rushing yards, including a 50-yard touchdown and 99 receiving yards, totaling 229 all-purpose yards in the Giants 34–13 loss to Philadelphia. In Week 11 against the Tampa Bay Buccaneers, Barkley rushed for his NFL career-high to date with 142 yards and three touchdowns as the Giants won 38–35, and for his efforts he was named the NFC Offensive Player of the Week. In Week 12's 25–22 loss to the Philadelphia Eagles, Barkley rushed for 101 yards and scored a 51-yard touchdown, becoming the first player since John Fuqua in 1970 to rush for two 50-plus yard touchdowns against the Eagles in a single season. In Week 13 against the Chicago Bears, Barkley had 125 rushing yards and three receptions for 21 yards in the 30–27 overtime win.

During Week 14, in the Giants' 40–16 win over the Redskins, Barkley rushed for 170 yards, including a 78-yard touchdown, becoming the first Giants rookie to surpass 1,000 rushing yards in a season, and setting the franchise's single-season record for rookies with 15 touchdowns scored. In the regular season finale against the Dallas Cowboys, Barkley had 17 carries for 109 yards, his seventh game with over 100 rushing yards on the season, and he scored a touchdown in the Giants' 36–35 loss. In recognition of his rookie season accomplishments, Barkley was elected to the 2019 Pro Bowl, where he helped the NFC win the Skills Showdown.

Barkley received numerous awards during and after his rookie season, including Pepsi Rookie of the Year, FedEx Ground NFL Player of the Year, AP NFL Offensive Rookie of the Year and was named to the PFWA All-Rookie Team and AP All-Rookie teams.

==== 2019 season ====
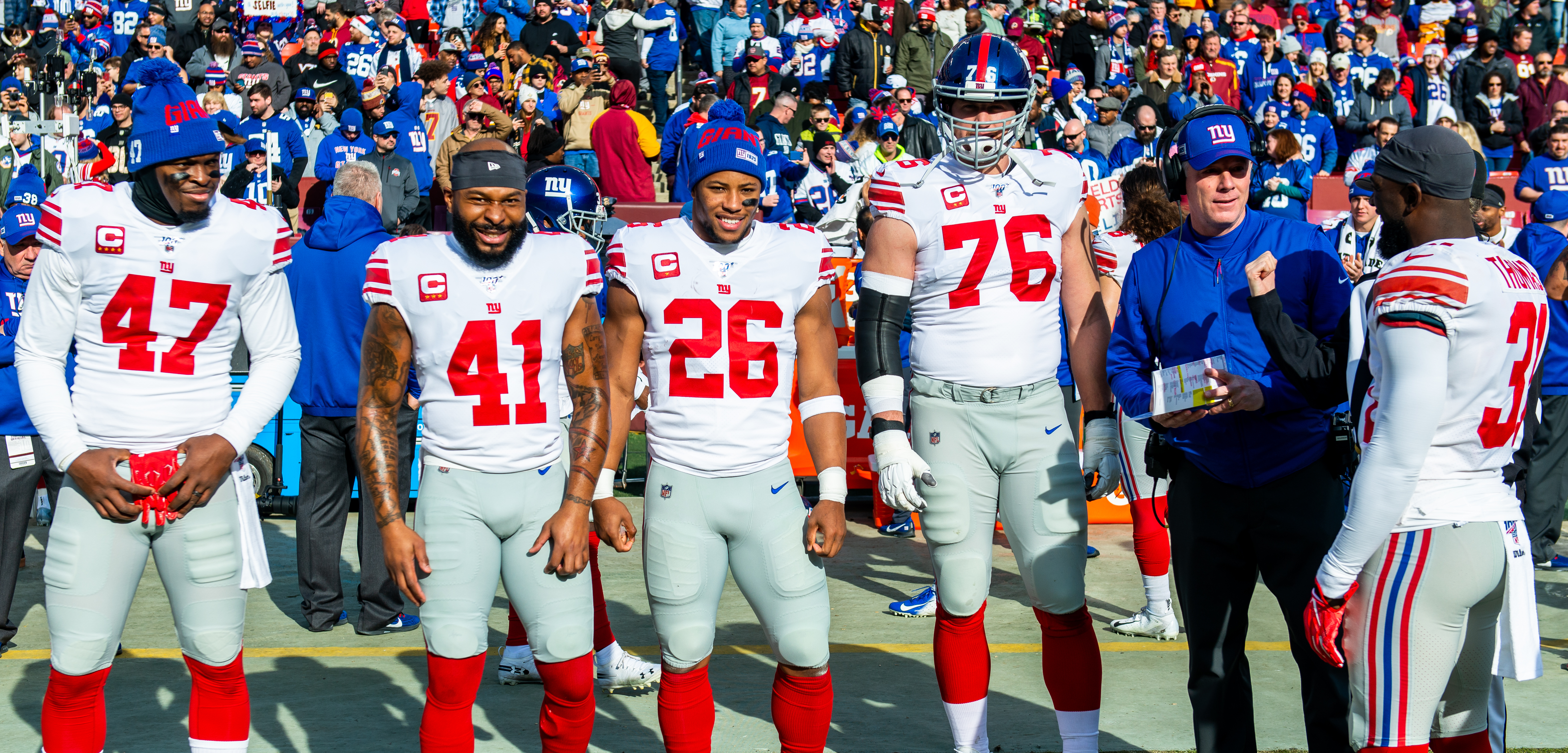
Barkley (#26 in center) with other Giants' team captains in December 2019

Entering his second NFL season, Barkley was ranked No. 16 on the NFL's Top 100 players for 2019. Barkley was chosen by his teammates as one of seven team captains for the 2019 season, an honor rarely bestowed on players after only one year on the team.

In Week 1 against the Cowboys, Barkley rushed 11 times for 120 yards, including a 59-yard run, in the Giants' 35–17 loss. In this game, he fumbled the ball for the first time in his NFL career. In Week 2 against the Buffalo Bills, Barkley rushed 18 times for 107 yards and a touchdown and caught three passes for 28 yards in the Giants' 28–14 loss to Buffalo. In Week 3 against the Buccaneers, Barkley suffered a high ankle sprain and was expected to miss four to eight weeks. Barkley made his return from the injury in Week 7 against the Arizona Cardinals. In the game, Barkley rushed 18 times for 72 yards and a touchdown in the Giants' 27–21 loss. In Week 8 against the Detroit Lions, Barkley rushed for a season-high 19 times and 64 yards and caught a season-high eight passes for 79 yards and a touchdown in the team's 31–26 loss. In Week 15 against the Miami Dolphins, Barkley rushed 24 times for 112 yards and two touchdowns and caught four passes for 31 yards in the Giants' 36–20 win. In Week 16, Barkley rushed for a career high 189 yards on 22 carries and caught four passes for 90 yards and two total touchdowns in a 41–35 win over the Redskins. He won the NFC Offensive Player of the Week award for his performance in Week 16. In Week 17 against the Eagles, Barkley rushed 17 times for 92 yards, including a season-long 68-yard run that resulted in a touchdown, during the Giants' 34–17 loss to Philadelphia. Barkley finished his sophomore season as the only running back in Giants' history to have 1,000 rushing yards in their first two seasons. He was ranked 31st by his fellow players on the NFL Top 100 Players of 2020.

==== 2020 season ====
In Week 1 against the Pittsburgh Steelers on Monday Night Football, Barkley rushed 15 times for six rushing yards and caught six passes for 60 receiving yards in the Giants' 26–16 loss to the Steelers. Barkley's 0.4 yards per attempt was a career low. During the following week's 17–13 loss to the Bears, Barkley was carted off the field after suffering a knee injury, which was later diagnosed as a torn anterior cruciate ligament, which ended his 2020 season. During the game, Barkley rushed to the right and engaged with Bears safety Eddie Jackson, who wrestled him down to the ground near the sideline at the end of a six-yard run. Barkley immediately grabbed the back of his right knee and removed his helmet. Jackson later voiced his concern on Twitter, sending prayers and support. Barkley was placed on injured reserve on September 22, 2020.

==== 2021 season ====
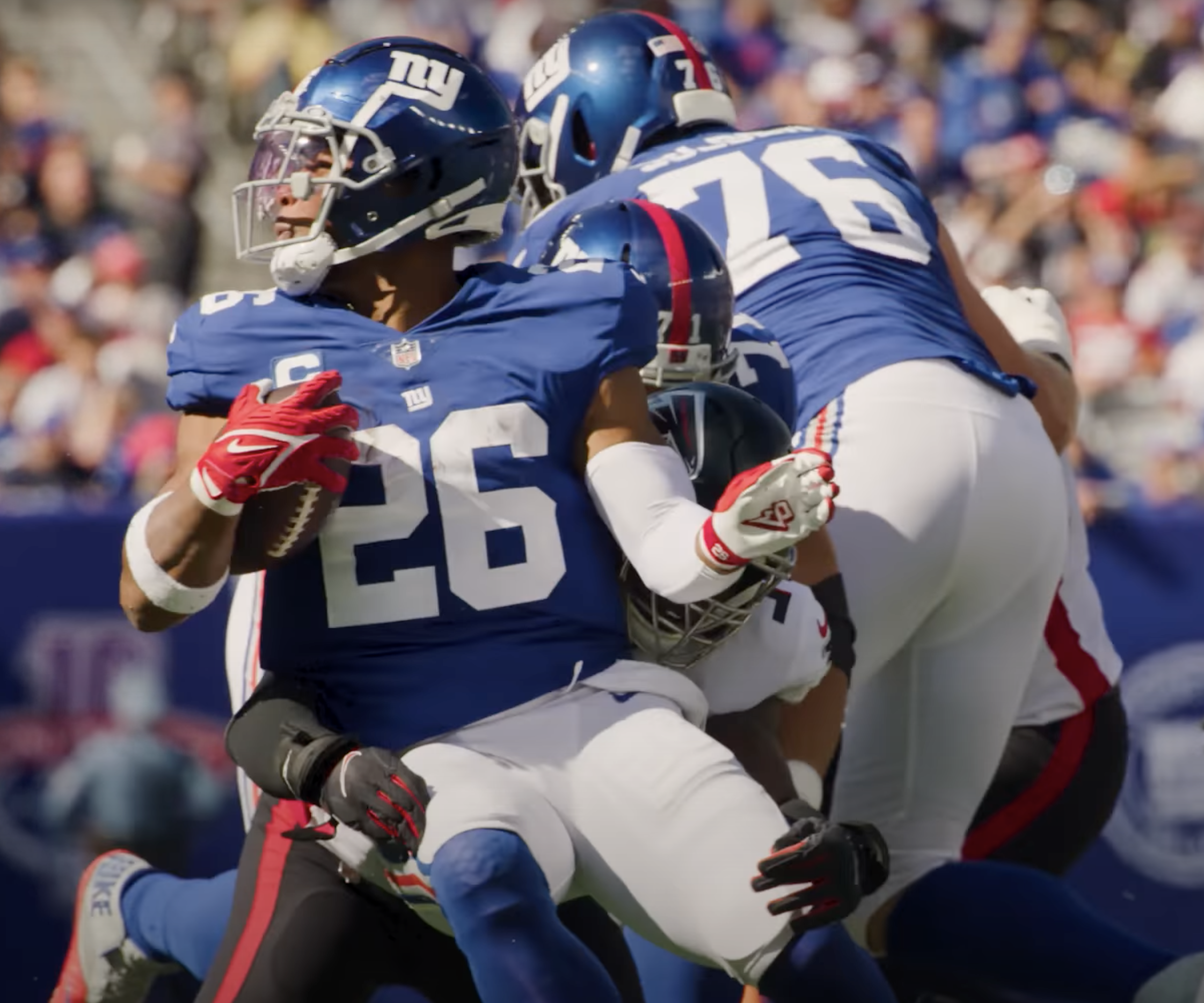
Barkley with the Giants against the Atlanta Falcons at MetLife Stadium in September 2021

On April 28, 2021, the Giants picked up the fifth-year option on Barkley's contract, worth a guaranteed $7.217 million for the 2022 season. In Week 5 against the Dallas Cowboys, Barkley's foot landed on Jourdan Lewis and his ankle rolled. On November 3, 2021, the Giants announced that Barkley was being placed in the NFL's COVID-19 protocol. In the 2021 season, Barkley had 593 rushing yards, two rushing touchdowns, 41 receptions, 263 receiving yards and two receiving touchdowns in 13 games.

==== 2022 season ====
Against the Tennessee Titans in Week 1, Barkley rushed for 164 yards, a touchdown, and caught six passes for 30 yards in the 21–20 comeback win. He converted the go-ahead two point conversion late in the fourth quarter. Barkley's performance on Sunday resulted in him receiving the NFC Offensive Player of the Week. In Week 3, Barkley had 126 scrimmage yards and a rushing touchdown in the 23–16 loss to the Cowboys. In Week 4, Barkley had 146 rushing yards in the 20–12 victory over the Bears. He was named to the Pro Bowl. In Week 10 against the Texans, he had 35 carries for 152 rushing yards and a rushing touchdown in the 24–16 victory. Overall, he finished the 2022 season with 295 carries for 1,312 rushing yards and ten rushing touchdowns to go along with 57 receptions for 338 receiving yards. He finished fourth in the NFL and first in the NFC in rushing yards. In the Wild Card Round of the playoffs, he had 109 scrimmage yards and two rushing touchdowns in the 31–24 victory over the Minnesota Vikings. He was ranked 31st by his fellow players on the NFL Top 100 Players of 2023.

==== 2023 season ====
On March 7, 2023, the Giants placed the non-exclusive franchise tag on Barkley. He signed the franchise tag after it was adjusted to add a $2 million signing bonus and incentives on July 26.

During Week 8 against the New York Jets, Barkley finished with 128 rushing yards on 36 carries as the Giants lost 10–13 in overtime. In Week 11 against the Commanders, he had 140 scrimmage yards and two receiving touchdowns in the victory. In Week 18 against Philadelphia, he had two rushing touchdowns in the victory. He finished the 2023 season with 247 carries for 962 rushing yards and six rushing touchdowns to go with 41 receptions for 280 receiving yards and four receiving touchdowns in 14 games and starts.

=== Philadelphia Eagles ===
On March 13, 2024, Barkley signed a three-year $37.75 million deal with the Philadelphia Eagles, of which $26 million was guaranteed over the first two years. The third year was not guaranteed, but the contract's value could increase to $46.75 million with bonuses. Prior to signing with the Eagles, Barkley admitted he was "fed up" with negotiations with the Giants, calling their approach "a little disrespectful". He felt slighted by the team's insistence that he had to prove his value on the open market, which he described as a "slap in the face".

==== 2024 season ====
On September 6, 2024, Barkley made his Eagles debut, rushing for 109 yards with two rushing touchdowns and a receiving touchdown in a 34–29 victory over the Green Bay Packers, becoming the first Eagles player to score three touchdowns in their debut with the team since Terrell Owens in 2004. His performance earned him NFC Offensive Player of the Week. The following week against the Atlanta Falcons, Barkley rushed for 95 yards and caught four of five passes for 21 yards. However, a late fourth-quarter drop that could have sealed the win for the Eagles proved costly as they would suffer their first loss, 22–21, after the Falcons scored the go-ahead touchdown with 34 seconds remaining. Barkley had 17 carries for 147 yards and scored two touchdowns in the fourth quarter to lead the Eagles to a 15–12 win over the New Orleans Saints in Week 3. Barkley made his return to MetLife Stadium against the Giants in Week 7, rushing for 176 yards and a touchdown on 17 carries in a 28–3 victory over his former team. For his performance, he was declared NFC Offensive Player of the Week, for the second time this season.

In Week 9, Barkley recorded 159 rushing yards and 199 scrimmage yards with two touchdowns, highlighted by a backwards hurdle over Jaguars cornerback Jarrian Jones, in a 28–23 win, earning NFC Offensive Player of the Week. In Week 11 against the Washington Commanders, Barkley finished with 198 total yards and rushed for two touchdowns in the fourth quarter as the Eagles won 26–18. Barkley continued his dominance the following week against the Los Angeles Rams, recording 255 rushing yards and 302 total yards, highlighted by multiple 70-yard touchdowns in the second half as the Eagles won 37–20, netting him his fourth NFC Offensive Player of the Week title for the season. His 255 rushing yards were the ninth-most in a single game in NFL history and the most in Eagles history. In Week 13, Barkley rushed for over 100 yards and recorded a fourth-quarter touchdown for the third consecutive game as the Eagles won 24–19 over the Baltimore Ravens, marking their eighth consecutive victory. A week later, Barkley ran for 124 yards and broke the Eagles' single-season rushing yards record previously set by LeSean McCoy in 2013.

In Week 17, Barkley ran for 167 yards and crossed the 2,000 yard mark, becoming only the ninth running back in NFL history to do so. Entering Week 18, Barkley sat at 2,005 rushing yards on the season, 101 yards shy of breaking Eric Dickerson's single-season rushing yards record. However, due to the Eagles having already clinched the NFC East and the #2 seed in the playoffs, head coach Nick Sirianni announced that Barkley and other Eagles starters would rest for the season finale against the New York Giants, which precluded Barkley from possibly passing Dickerson's all-time record. Barkley finished the season leading the league with a franchise-record 2,283 yards from scrimmage, which was a league-high 34.8 percent of the team's output, while adding 15 touchdowns. He was named a First-team All-Pro, won the Offensive Player of the Year award, and finished third in MVP voting.

In the Wild Card Round against the Green Bay Packers, Barkley rushed 25 times for a total of 119 yards to help the Eagles to a 22–10 win. In the Divisional Round against the Los Angeles Rams, Barkley replicated his historic performance against Los Angeles in Week 12, rushing for 205 yards and two touchdowns, both of which coming off of 60+ yard rushes. The Eagles won 28–22 to advance to the NFC Championship Game. Against the Commanders in the NFC Championship, Barkley ran for 118 yards and three touchdowns on 15 carries as the Eagles won 55–23, advancing to Super Bowl LIX. In the Super Bowl, which fell on the day of his 28th birthday, Barkley recorded 57 rushing yards and 40 receiving yards as the Eagles beat the Kansas City Chiefs, 40–22, giving Barkley his first Super Bowl championship. He also set NFL records for most rushing (2,504) and scrimmage yards (2,857) in a full season, surpassing Terrell Davis. Barkley was ranked the best player in the NFL by his fellow players on the NFL Top 100 Players of 2025.

==== 2025 season ====
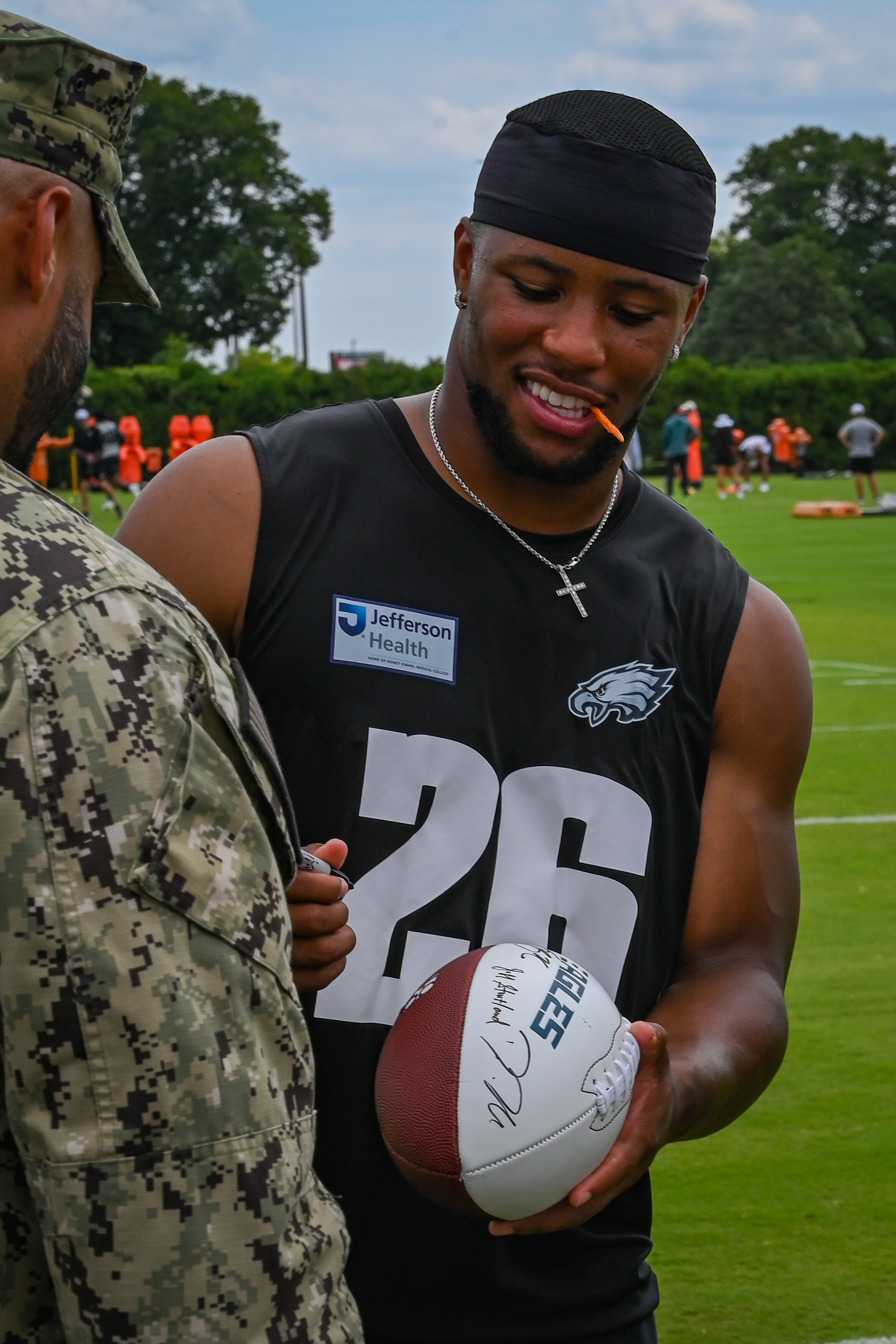
Barkley in 2025

On March 4, 2025, Barkley signed a two-year, $41.2 million contract extension with the Eagles that includes $36 million guaranteed and up to $15 million more in incentives. The extension functions as a new four-year contract starting in the 2025 season. Should Barkley reach one or more of the incentives in a given year, the incentive amount is added to Barkley's salary in each of the future remaining contract years. The guaranteed salary amount and its average dollars per year ($20.6 million), even without incentives taken into account, made Barkley the highest paid running back in NFL history.

In Week 8, Barkley had 14 carries for 150 yards and a touchdown to go with a receiving touchdown in the 38–20 win over the Giants. In Week 14, a 22–19 overtime loss to the Chargers, he had 20 carries for 122 yards and a touchdown. In Week 16, against the Commanders, he had 21 carries for 132 yards and a touchdown in the 29–18 win. In the 2025 season, he recorded 280 carries for 1,140 rushing yards and seven rushing touchdowns to go with 37 receptions for 273 receiving yards and two receiving touchdowns. In the Wild Card Round of the postseason, he had 131 scrimmage yards in the 23–19 loss to the 49ers.

== Career statistics ==
Legend
	AP NFL Offensive Player of the Year
	Won the Super Bowl
	Led the league
**Bold**	Career high

=== NFL ===
==== Regular season ====
Year	Team	Games		Rushing					Receiving					Scrimmage				Fumbles	
Year	Team	GP	GS	Att	Yds	Avg	Lng	TD	Rec	Yds	Avg	Lng	TD	Touch	Y/Tch	YScm	RRTD	Fum	Lost
2018	NYG	16	16	261	1,307	5.0	**78**	11	**91**	**721**	7.9	57	**4**	352	5.8	2,028	**15**	0	0
2019	NYG	13	13	217	1,003	4.6	68	6	52	438	8.4	**65**	2	269	5.4	1,441	8	1	0
2020	NYG	2	2	19	34	1.8	8	0	6	60	**10.0**	20	0	25	3.8	94	0	0	0
2021	NYG	13	13	162	593	3.7	41	2	41	263	6.4	54	2	203	4.2	856	4	**2**	1
2022	NYG	16	16	295	1,312	4.4	68	10	57	338	5.9	41	0	352	4.7	1,650	10	1	0
2023	NYG	14	14	247	962	3.9	36	6	41	280	6.8	46	**4**	288	4.3	1,242	10	**2**	**2**
2024	PHI	16	16	**345**	**2,005**	**5.8**	72	**13**	33	278	8.4	43	2	**378**	**6.0**	**2,283**	**15**	**2**	1
2025	PHI	16	16	280	1,140	4.1	65	7	37	273	7.4	47	2	317	4.5	1,413	9	1	1
2026	PHI	7	7	69	296	4.3	42	3	7	41	5.9	24	0	76	4.4	337	3	1	0
Career		113	113	1,895	8,652	4.6	78	58	365	2,692	7.4	65	16	2,260	5.0	11,344	74	10	5

==== Postseason ====
Year	Team	Games		Rushing					Receiving					Scrimmage				Fumbles	
Year	Team	GP	GS	Att	Yds	Avg	Lng	TD	Rec	Yds	Avg	Lng	TD	Touch	Y/Tch	YScm	RRTD	Fum	Lost
2022	NYG	2	2	18	114	**6.3**	39	2	7	**77**	**11.0**	**24**	0	25	**7.6**	191	2	0	0
2024	PHI	4	4	**91**	**499**	5.5	**78**	**5**	**13**	75	5.8	22	0	**104**	5.5	**574**	**5**	0	0
2025	PHI	1	1	26	106	4.1	29	0	3	25	8.3	20	0	29	4.5	131	0	0	0
Career		7	7	135	719	5.3	78	7	23	177	7.7	24	0	158	5.7	896	7	0	0

=== College ===
Season	Team	Games		Rushing				Receiving				Kick returns			
Season	Team	GP	GS	Att	Yds	Avg	TD	Rec	Yds	Avg	TD	Ret	Yds	Avg	TD
2015	Penn State	11	6	182	1,076	**5.9**	7	20	161	8.1	1	0	0	0.0	0
2016	Penn State	14	14	**272**	**1,496**	5.5	**18**	28	402	**14.4**	**4**	3	74	24.7	0
2017	Penn State	13	12	217	1,271	**5.9**	**18**	**54**	**632**	11.7	3	**15**	**426**	**28.4**	**2**
Career		38	32	672	3,843	5.7	43	102	1,195	11.7	8	18	500	27.8	2

== Career highlights ==
=== Awards and honors ===
NFL

- Super Bowl champion (LIX)
- 3× Pro Bowl – (2018, 2022, 2024)
- NFL Offensive Player of the Year – (2024)
- First-team All-Pro – (2024)
- NFL rushing yards leader – (2024)
- Pepsi NFL Rookie of the Year – (2018)
- FedEx Ground Player of the Year – (2018)
- NFL Offensive Rookie of the Year – (2018)
- PFWA All-Rookie Team – (2018)
- 6× NFL Top 100 - 16th (2019), 31st (2020), 31st (2023), 86th (2024), 1st (2025), 34th (2026)

College

- Fiesta Bowl champion, 2017
- Six-time Big Ten Offensive Player of the Week, 2017, 2016
- ESPN and Sporting News Midseason All American – 2017
- Two-time Big Ten Special Teams Player of the Week (2017)
- Paul Hornung Award, 2017
- Consensus All-American, 2017
- Sporting News All-American First team, 2017
- ESPN First Team All-American, 2017
- FWAA First Team All-American, 2017
- Associated Press First Team All-American, 2017
- Walter Camp First Team All-American, 2017
- Big Ten Offensive Player of the Year 2016 and 2017
- Big Ten Running Back of the Year, 2016 and 2017
- Big Ten Return Specialist of the Year, 2017
- Big Ten champion, 2016
- Associated Press Third Team All-American, 2016
- Sporting News All-American second team, 2016
- All-Big Ten First team, 2016
- All-Big Ten Second team, 2015

=== Records ===
==== NFL records ====
- Most 100+ yards from scrimmage games by a rookie – 12 games
- Most 50+ yard touchdowns by a rookie – 5 (tied with Randy Moss)
- Most receptions by a rookie running back – 91
- Most rushing yards in an NFL season (regular and postseason) – 2,504 yards
- Most scrimmage yards in an NFL season (regular and postseason) – 2,857 yards

==== Giants franchise records ====
- Most rushing touchdowns in a season by a rookie – 11
- Most rushing yards in a season by a rookie – 1,307
- Most total touchdowns in a season by a rookie – 15
- First Giants' running back to rush for 1,000 yards in each of first two seasons

==== Eagles franchise records ====
- Most rushing yards in a season – 2,005 (2024)
- Most 100 yard rushing games in a season – 12 (2024)
- First player to rush for 2,000 yards in a season (2024)
- Most rushing yards in a single game – 255 vs. Los Angeles Rams on November 24, 2024
- Most total yards from scrimmage in a single game – 302 vs. Los Angeles Rams on November 24, 2024
- Most rushing yards in a playoff game – 205 vs. Los Angeles Rams on January 19, 2025

==== Penn State records ====
- Most career rushing touchdowns: 43
- Most rushing yards by a freshman: 1,076 yards
- Most rushing yards by a sophomore: 1,496 yards
- Most total yards in a single game: 358 yards (vs. Iowa)
- First player to score a return and passing touchdown in the same game

== Personal life ==
On February 2, 2025, Barkley announced his engagement to Anna Congdon, his college sweetheart. The couple have two children. They live in Malvern, Pennsylvania. Barkley is a Christian.

In 2018, the Pennsylvania General Assembly voted to make March 14 a state holiday known as "Saquon Barkley Day". Barkley and his family participated in a parade through his hometown of Coplay, Pennsylvania, that included the Whitehall High School marching band and children from the league where Barkley played youth football.

Also in 2018, Barkley was a featured athlete in the 10th Edition of ESPN The Magazine's The Body Issue.

In 2025, Barkley starred in a Super Bowl commercial for the financial technology company Ramp, in which he is an investor. He is also an investor in several other startup companies, among them Anduril Industries.

In June 2025, Barkley was revealed as the cover athlete for Madden 26, becoming the second Eagle after Donovan McNabb for Madden 06 to grace the cover.

In August 2025, Barkley told reporters that he was invited to join President Donald Trump's Council on Sports, Fitness, and Nutrition, but he declined the offer.

== See also ==
- List of National Football League records (individual)
- List of New York Giants first-round draft picks
