= Dominick Bragalone =

American gridiron football player (born 1996)

Profile
- Position: Running back

Personal information
- Born: November 17, 1996 (age 29); Williamsport, Pennsylvania, U.S.
- Listed height: 5 ft 11 in (1.80 m)
- Listed weight: 225 lb (102 kg)

Career information
- High school: South Williamsport (South Williamsport, Pennsylvania)
- College: Lehigh
- NFL draft: 2019: undrafted

Career history
- Montreal Alouettes (2020–2021)

Awards and highlights
- First-team AP FCS All-American (2017); Patriot League Offensive Player of the Year (2017); 4× First-team All-Patriot League; Patriot League Rookie of the Year (2015)

Dominick Bragalone (born November 17, 1996) is an American former football running back. He played college football for the Lehigh Mountain Hawks.

Bragalone attended high school in South Williamsport, Pennsylvania where in his senior season set Pennsylvania's all-time record for single season rushing yards with 4,704 yards. He sits second on the single season rushing total nationally, winning the 2014 Mr. Pennsylvania Football award. Bragalone's collegiate career ended in 2019 as he graduated from Lehigh University with a bachelor's degree in psychology.

== High school ==
Bragalone attended South Williamsport Area High School in South Williamsport, Pennsylvania. He played football and ran track where he excelled in both. He was a 2014 MaxPreps small school All-American, honorable mention Parade Magazine All-American and two-time Pennsylvania Class A Player of the Year. two-time Pennsylvania Class A All-State. He set state single season rushing record for the state of Pennsylvania with 4704 yards and second-highest single-season rushing total in the nation.

=== Awards ===
- 2× Pennsylvania Class A Player of the Year
- 2× PA Class A All-State
- Parade Magazine All American
- Sun Gazette All Area Team
- PA Football All-State
- MaxPreps All-American
- PrepFBall All-American
- Mr. Pennsylvania Football (2014) co-winner with Saquon Barkley

=== Records ===
- Single season Pennsylvania rushing record (As of end of 2017 season)
- Highest rushing total in Pennsylvania history (As of end of 2017 season)
- Second highest rushing total in nation (As of end of 2017 season)

== College career ==
Bragalone chose Lehigh over walk-on spots at Penn State and Rutgers. In his first season Bragalone rushed for over 1,000 yards the first Lehigh freshman to do so in over 10 years. Upon Bragalone's stellar freshman season he was named Patriot League Rookie of the Year. Coming into his sophomore season Bragalone was named on numerous national award watchlists. In 2016 Bragalone rushed for over 1,100 yards and 14 touchdowns.

In his junior year (2017) he rushed for 1,388 yards and 18 TDs. He also gained 224 yards as a receiver with 4 TDs. In his best game, Bragalone rushed for a 218 yards and 2 TDs against Fordham.

=== Statistics ===
| Year | Team | Games | Rushing | | | | Receiving | | | |
| Year | Team | Games | Att | Yds | Avg | TD | Rec | Yds | Avg | TD |
|---|---|---|---|---|---|---|---|---|---|---|
| 2015 | Lehigh | 11 | 179 | 1,008 | 5.6 | 7 | 14 | 254 | 18.1 | 1 |
| 2016 | Lehigh | 12 | 206 | 1,171 | 5.7 | 14 | 10 | 105 | 10.5 | 1 |
| 2017 | Lehigh | 12 | 247 | 1,388 | 5.6 | 18 | 13 | 224 | 20.2 | 4 |
| 2018 | Lehigh | 10 | 217 | 757 | 3.5 | 7 | 4 | 11 | 2.8 | 0 |
| Career | | 44 | 849 | 4,324 | 5.1 | 46 | 41 | 594 | 14.5 | 6 |

==== Awards ====
- Patriot League Offensive Player of the Year (2017)
- First team Associated Press FCS All-American (2017)
- First team AFCA All-American
- First team Walter Camp All-American
- First team STATS All-American
- 4x First team All-Patriot League
- ECAC Offensive Rookie of the Year (2015)
- Patriot League Rookie of the Year (2015)
- FCS Rushing Leader (2017)

== Professional career ==
Bragalone was invited to both the New York Giants' and Houston Texans' rookie mini-camps, but did not sign a contract with either team. He signed with the Montreal Alouettes on February 26, 2020. His number was 35 prior to his release.
