= Roaring Spring Historic District =

Historic district in Pennsylvania, United States

- U.S. National Register of Historic Places
- U.S. Historic district
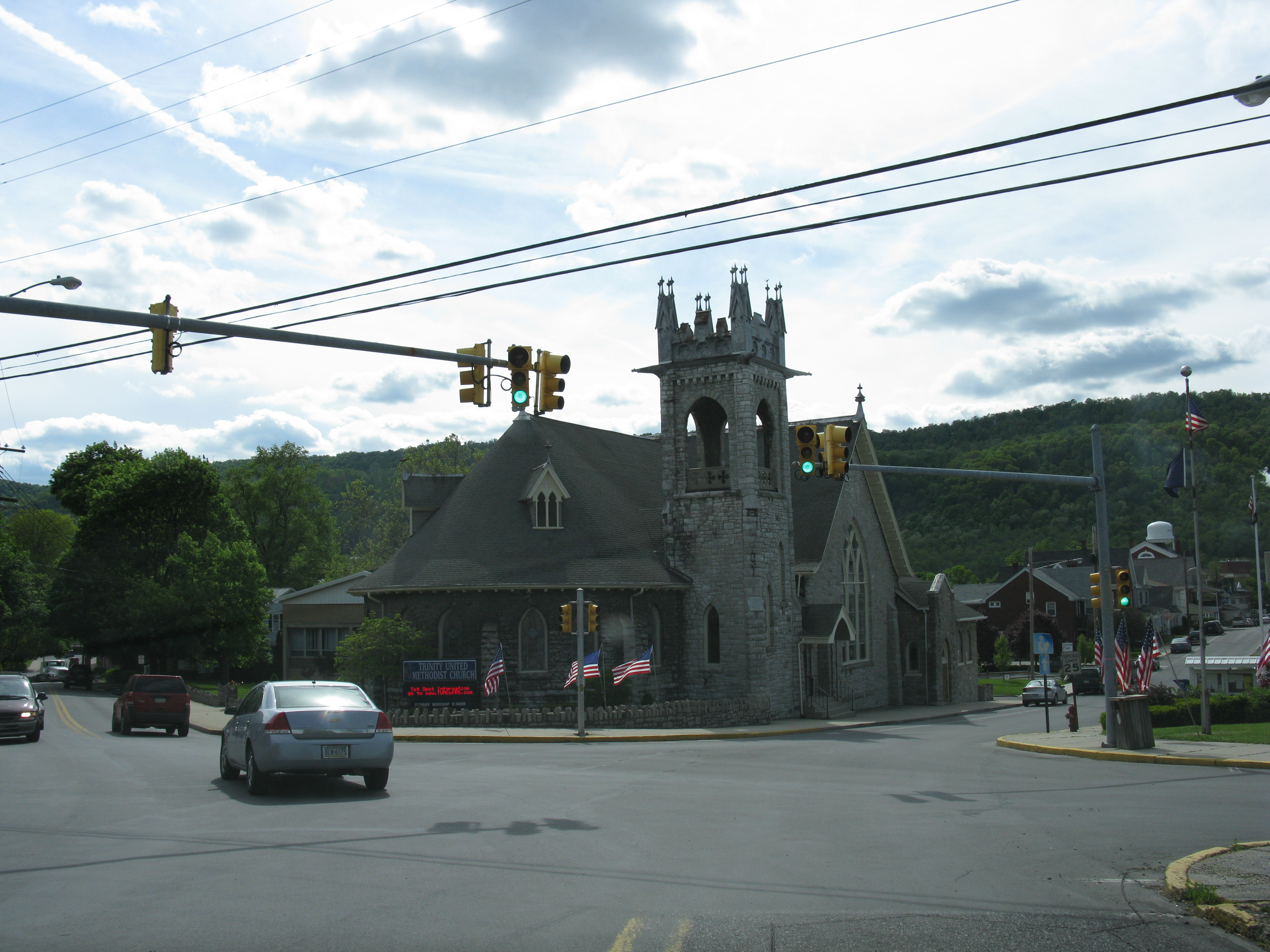
- Roaring Spring Historic District, May 2008

- Location within Pennsylvania Location within the United States
- Location: Roughly bounded by Barley, Lower, Walnut, Roosevelt, California, Hickory, Fairview, Sugar and N. Main Sts., Roaring Spring, Pennsylvania
- Coordinates: 40°20′5″N 78°23′56″W
- Area: 233 acres (94 ha)
- Built: 1867
- Built by: Roaring Spring Planing Mill Co.
- Architectural style: Colonial Revival, Queen Anne
- NRHP reference No.: 95000133
- Added to NRHP: March 3, 1995

The Roaring Spring Historic District is a national historic district that is located in Roaring Spring, Blair County, Pennsylvania.

It was added to the National Register of Historic Places in 1995.

== History and architectural features ==
This district includes 573 contributing buildings, three contributing sites, and two contributing structures that are locarted in the central business district and surrounding residential areas of Roaring Spring. The earliest buildings date to the 1860s, when the community was founded as the region's first paper mill town. The buildings are primarily frame and brick, with notable examples of Colonial Revival and Queen Anne style architecture.

Notable non-residential buildings include the Odd Fellows Hall (1882), Hite's Furniture Store (c. 1888), the Roaring Spring Bank (1902), the old borough building and fire station (1906), the Zook Building (c. 1885), Bare Memorial Church of God (1889-1930), Trinity United Methodist Church (1898), the Blank Book Company buildings, and the Roaring Spring Passenger Station (c. 1905). Also located in the district are the Bare Memorial Fountain (1937) and Greenlawn Cemetery and Memorial Park.
