= Millerstown, Sandusky County, Ohio =

Millerstown
- Unincorporated community
- Location within the state of Wyoming
- Coordinates: 41°18′43″N 83°16′53″W
- Country: United States
- State: Ohio
- Counties: Sandusky
- Elevation: 696 ft (212 m)
- Time zone: UTC-5 (Eastern (EST))
  - Summer (DST): UTC-4 (EDT)
- GNIS feature ID: 1048977

Millerstown or Millersville is an unincorporated community in Sandusky County, in the U.S. state of Ohio.
