= Central High School (Martinsburg, Pennsylvania) =

Coordinates: 40.30549°N 78.34005°W

Location
- 718 Central High Road; Martinsburg, (Blair County), Pennsylvania 16662; United States

Information
- Type: Public high school
- Principal: Stephanie Thompson
- Staff: 35.81 (FTE)
- Enrollment: 530 (2023-24)
- Student to teacher ratio: 14.80
- Colors: Red and gray
- Nickname: Dragons
- Website: Central High School

Central High School in Martinsburg, Pennsylvania is the smallest of the three Central High Schools in the commonwealth of Pennsylvania with 674 students in four grades (9-12). Central High opened in 1960 with the merging of Roaring Spring High School, Morrison Cove High School, and Martinsburg High School; becoming the first and only high school in Spring Cove School District history.

The school building is located on Central High Rd. and lies on ground surrounded by farm fields. The current Central High School building lies at the base of Bean Hill, where Morrison Cove High building still stands as Canary Laboratories and an Auxiliary Gym used by CHS.

== Extracurricular activities ==
Central High Schools has many Extracurricular activities, both athletic and non-athletic, that students are able to participate in.

Central also has a history of having many state champions and national qualifiers in FBLA competitions. The 2009 Business team also advanced to the State competition for the first time by beating Richland in the regional tournament.

Central competes in the Laurel Highlands Athletic Conference (LHAC) in Central-Pennsylvania. It has regularly won district titles in various sports since joining. In 2022, the Dragons won their second state championship in baseball; completing a perfect season.
