= Kemon Spell =

American football player (born 2009)

McKeesport Tigers
- Position: Running back

Personal information
- Born: April 27, 2009 (age 17)
- Listed height: 5 ft 10 in (1.78 m)
- Listed weight: 210 lb (95 kg)

Career information
- High school: McKeesport Area High School (McKeesport, Pennsylvania)

Kemon Spell (born April 27, 2009) is an American football running back at McKeesport Area High School in Pennsylvania. He is a five-star recruit and one of the top prospects in the class of 2027.

== Early life ==
Spell is from McKeesport, Pennsylvania. He has a brother who plays for the California Golden Bears. Spell attended McKeesport Area High School and played football as a running back and safety while also participating in track and field as a sprinter. Spell became a starter as a freshman and ran for over 100 yards and two touchdowns in his first game. As a sophomore, he posted an average of over 10 yards per carry, running 157 times for 1,681 yards and 24 touchdowns. The following year, Spell was named the Pittsburgh Tribune-Review Player of the Year after running for 1,755 yards while scoring 32 touchdowns despite missing several games due to injury. He was also named the All-East Offensive Player of the Year by USA Today. In his first three seasons at McKeesport, the school reached the WPIAL championship each year.

A five-star recruit, Spell is ranked the number one running back in the class of 2027. He is also one of the top 10 overall prospects in the nation. Spell initially committed to play college football for the Penn State Nittany Lions. However, he later changed his commitment to the Georgia Bulldogs in February 2026.
