= Rushel Shell III =

American gridiron football player (born 1993)

Rushel Shell
Profile
- Position: Running back

Personal information
- Born: September 7, 1993 (age 33); Aliquippa, Pennsylvania, U.S.
- Listed height: 5 ft 10 in (1.78 m)
- Listed weight: 221 lb (100 kg)

Career information
- High school: Aliquippa (PA) Hopewell
- College: West Virginia
- NFL draft: 2017: undrafted

Career history
- Pittsburgh Steelers (2017)*; Calgary Stampeders (2018)*
- * Offseason or practice squad member only

Rushel Shell III (born September 7, 1993) is an American former football running back. He played college football at Pittsburgh and West Virginia, and was signed by the Pittsburgh Steelers as an undrafted free agent in 2017.

Shell was also a member of the Calgary Stampeders of the Canadian Football League (CFL).

== Early life ==
Shell finished his career as the leading rusher in Pennsylvania state and WPIAL history. He also set a new national record by running for 100 yards or more in 39 consecutive games and ran for 200 yards or more 25 times in his high school career.

In 2008, Shell was MaxPrep's national freshman of the year after rushing for 1,516 yards. He also became the first freshman to ever make the Pittsburgh Post-Gazette’s "Fabulous 22".

In 2009, as a sophomore, Shell rushed for 2,740 yards—becoming only the third player in WPIAL history to rush for over 2,000 yards in the regular season, raising his career total to 4,256. He was again named to the "Fabulous 22" following the season.

In 2010, prior to his junior season, he was named the Pittsburgh Tribune-Review’s preseason player of the year. He ran for 2,102 yards during the regular season (9 games), the third highest total in WPIAL history, and became the first WPIAL player to twice rush for 2,000 yards in the regular season. He finished the season with 2,510 yards, raising his career total to 6,766. Following the season, he was named the Post-Gazette's player of the year, was again named to the "Fabulous 22," and was selected as the inaugural "Mr. Pennsylvania" for football. MaxPreps also named him to their second team All-American team.

In 2011, prior to his senior season, he was named to the Post-Gazette's pre-season Fabulous 22. On September 23, he set a new WPIAL record for most career rushing yards. He finished the regular season with 1,764 yards rushing, the most in the WPIAL. In his last game, he set a new state record for most rushing yards and broke the national record by rushing for 100+ yards for the 39th consecutive game. He finished the season with 2,302 yards, giving him 9,078 yards for his career. Following the season, he was again named the Post-Gazette's player of the year, becoming only the third two-time winner. He was also named second team All-American by Sports Illustrated.

=== Rushing records ===
On November 11, 2011, Shell broke the record for most rushing yards in Pennsylvania state history, finishing with 9,078 yards. The former state high school rushing record was 9,027 yards and was held by Bucknell's Jeremiah Young, who played at Steelton-Highspire High School. The total would rank him 10th in national history, according to the 2011 NFHS record book.

In the same game, he finished with 100+ yards rushing for the 39th consecutive time, breaking the national record held by former Oklahoma star Billy Sims.

On September 23, 2011, Shell set a new WPIAL record for career rushing yards—finishing the game with 7,718 yards and surpassing Mike Vernillo's record of 7,646.

Shell once held the Beaver County record for most rushing yards in one game (392, set October 8, 2010).

=== Senior season ===
Initial reports were that he ran for the following number of yards in each game:

- September 2 (vs. Belle Vernon): 147 yards
- September 9 (vs. Montour): 233 yards
- September 16 (at Moon): 367 yards
- September 23 (vs. Mt. Lebanon): 205 yards
- September 30 (at Blackhawk): 109 yards
- October 7 (vs. New Castle): injured
- October 14 (at Central Valley): 264 yards
- October 21 (at Ambridge): 226 yards
- October 28 (vs. West Allegheny): 216 yards
- November 4 (playoffs round 1, at Indiana): 256 yards
- November 11 (playoffs round 2, vs. Franklin Regional): 292 yards

Shell led the WPIAL with 1,764 yards during the regular season and ran for 2,312 yards total, giving him 9,078 yards for his career.

=== Junior season ===
Initial reports were that he ran for the following number of yards in each game:

- September 3: 168 yards
- September 10: 318 yards
- September 17: 267 yards
- September 24: 137 yards
- October 1: 132 yards
- October 8: 392 yards
- October 15: 302 yards
- October 22: 204 yards
- October 28: 193 yards
- November 5: 135 yards
- November 12: 238 yards

After adjustments were made, his final totals were: 2,102 yards during the regular season (9 games), placing him second in the WPIAL, and 2,510 yards for the season (an average of 228 per game) — giving him 6,766 for his career.

== College career ==
As a high school senior running back at Hopewell High School, Shell was regarded by many as one of the top high school athletes in the country. He was ranked as the 11th best overall prospect (and 3rd best Running Back) in the class of 2012 by MaxPreps, 20th (#4 RB) by Scout.com, 24th (#3 RB) by ESPNU and 45th (#5 RB) by Rivals.com. After receiving numerous scholarship offers from top football programs throughout the country, Shell announced his commitment to Pitt on October 14, 2011.

In 12 games with Pitt during his freshman season, Shell rushed for 641 yards on 141 carries and scored 4 touchdowns. He also caught 9 passes for 103 yards.

Prior to his sophomore season, Shell quit the Pitt football team with the intention to transfer to another school. Shell initially decided to transfer to UCLA before attempting to return to Pitt, but head coach Paul Chryst refused Shell's request. Shell ultimately narrowed his choices of transfer destinations to the University of Kentucky and West Virginia University before deciding to enroll at West Virginia.

In three seasons with West Virginia, Shell played in 35 games, carrying 450 times for 2,010 yards and 20 touchdowns. He also received 49 passes for 341 yards.

== Professional career ==
Pre-draft measurables
Height	Weight	Arm length	Hand span	40-yard dash	Vertical jump	Bench press
5 ft 10 in (1.78 m)	227 lb (103 kg)	30 in (0.76 m)	9 5/8 in (0.24 m)	4.74 s	32.5 in (0.83 m)	21 reps

=== Pittsburgh Steelers ===
Shell was signed by the Pittsburgh Steelers as an undrafted free agent on April 29, 2017. He was waived by the Steelers on June 14.

=== Calgary Stampeders ===
Shell was signed by the Calgary Stampeders of the Canadian Football League as a running back on May 17, 2018. However, he was later released by the Stampeders on June 10.
