= Roaring Spring, Pennsylvania =

Borough in Pennsylvania, US

- Borough
- Location of Roaring Spring in Blair County, Pennsylvania.

- Location within Pennsylvania
- Coordinates: 40°20′04″N 78°23′55″W
- Country: United States
- State: Pennsylvania
- County: Blair
- Settled: 1865
- Incorporated: 1888

Government
  - Type: Borough Council
  - President: Ronald Glunt
  - Vice-president: Sue Ann Feather

Area
  - Total: 0.81 sq mi (2.09 km^{2})
  - Land: 0.81 sq mi (2.09 km^{2})
  - Water: 0 sq mi (0.00 km^{2})
- Elevation: 1,027 ft (313 m)

Population (2020)
  - Total: 2,384
  - Density: 2,961.0/sq mi (1,143.23/km^{2})
- Time zone: UTC-5 (Eastern (EST))
  - Summer (DST): UTC-4 (EDT)
- Zip code: 16673
- Area code: 814
- FIPS code: 42-65256
- GNIS feature ID: 1202160
- Website: Roaring Spring

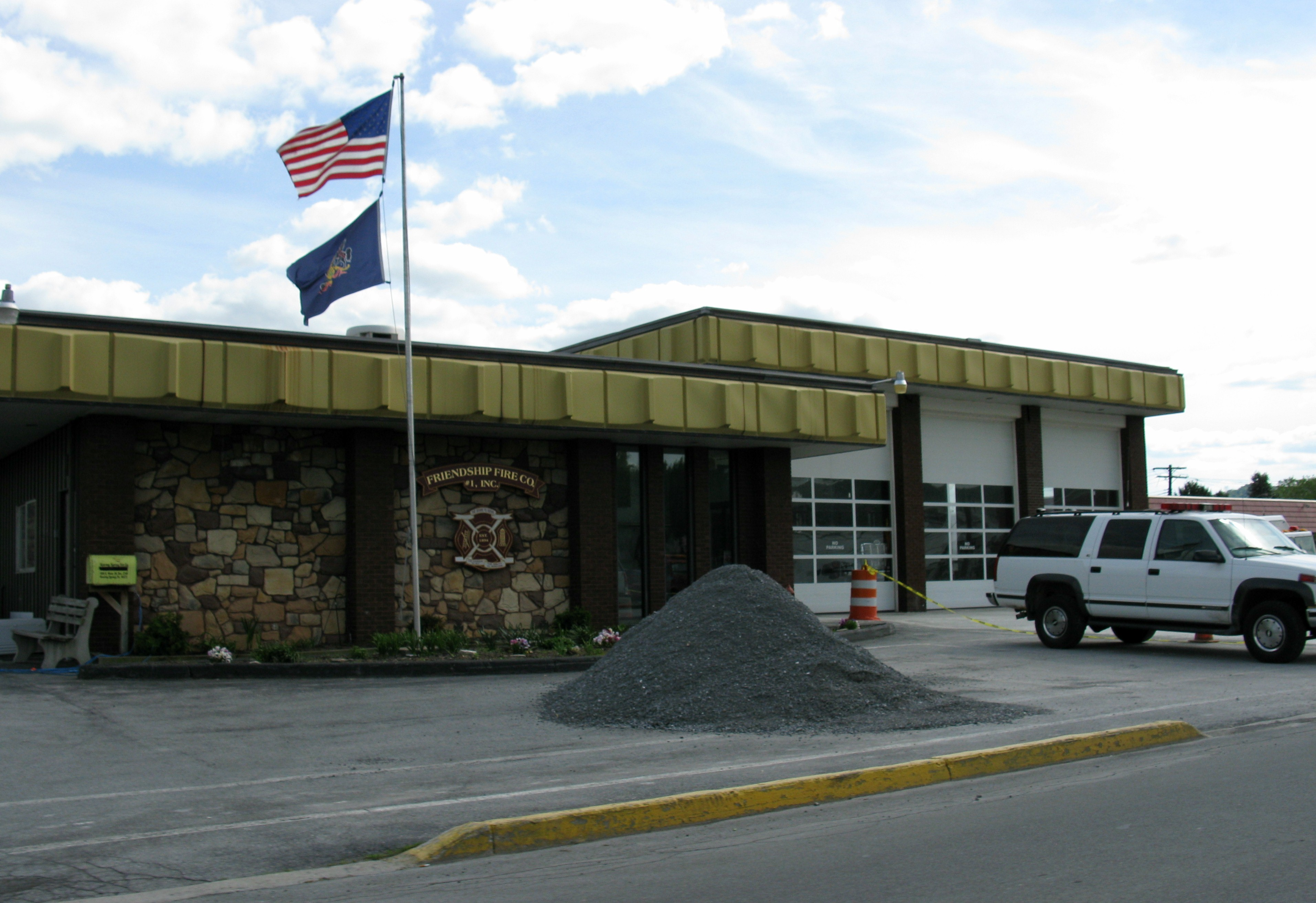
Friendship Fire Company

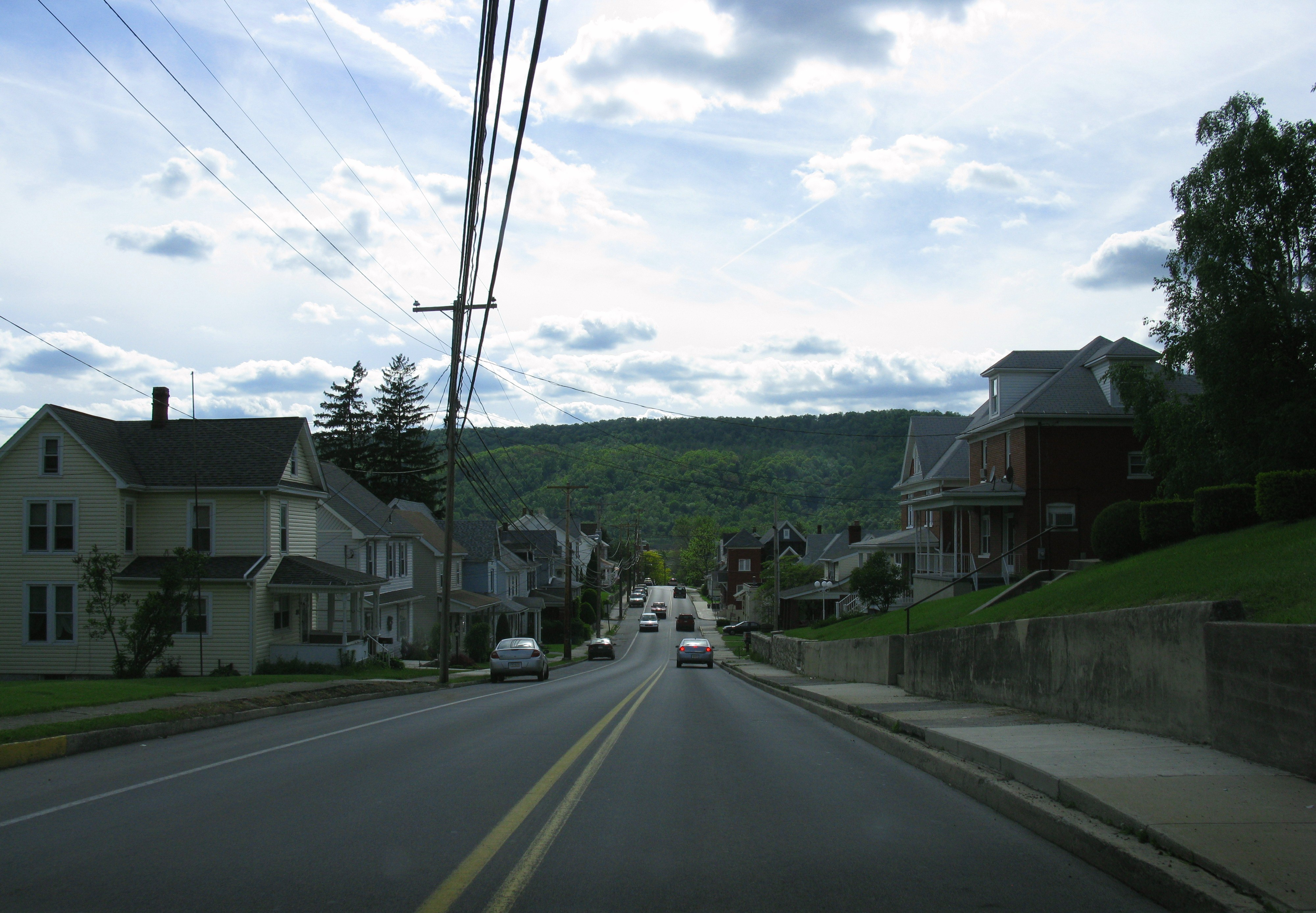
Main Street approaching Cherry Street

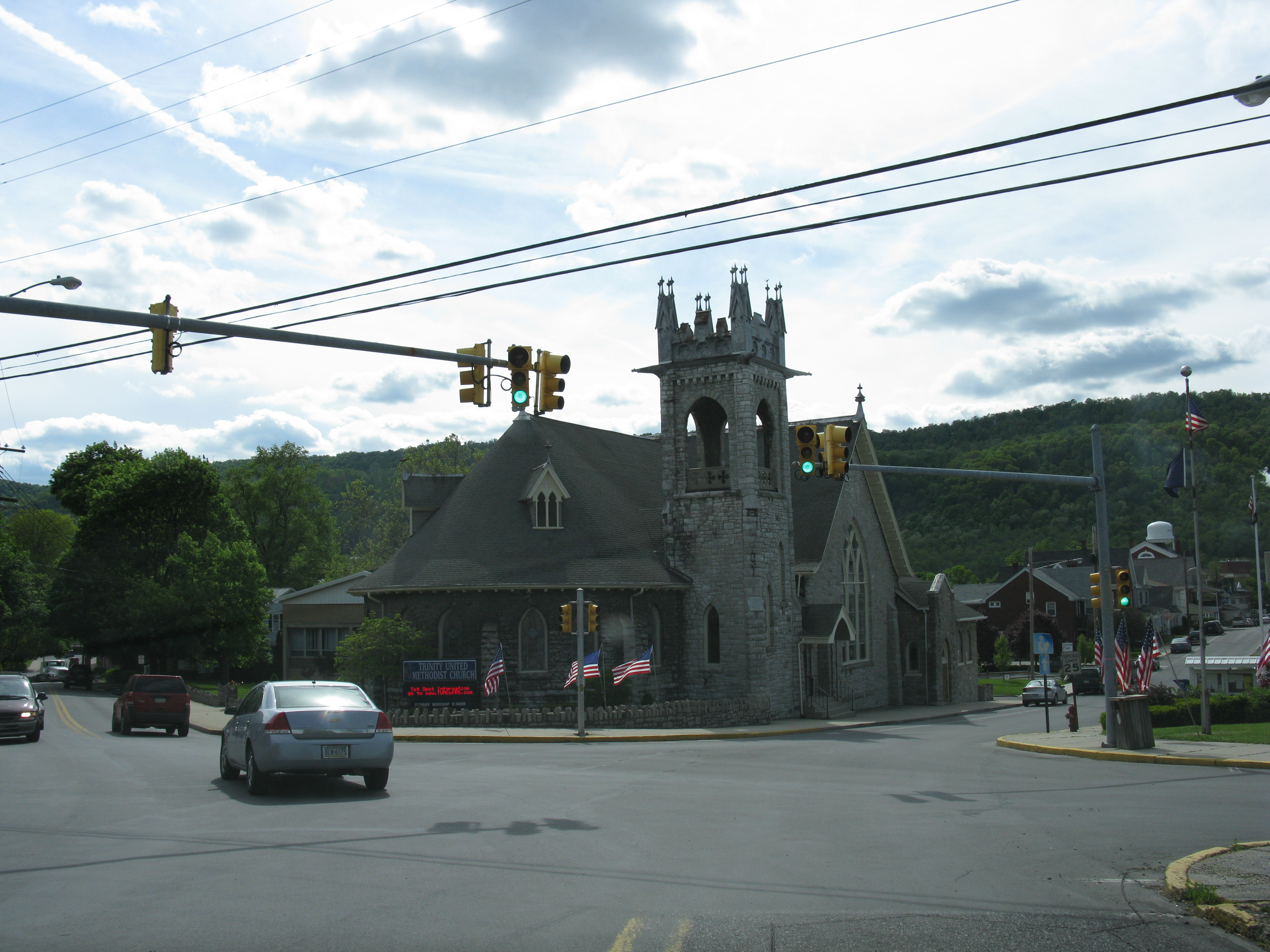
Main Street at Spang Street / Church Street, locally referred to as "The 5-points"

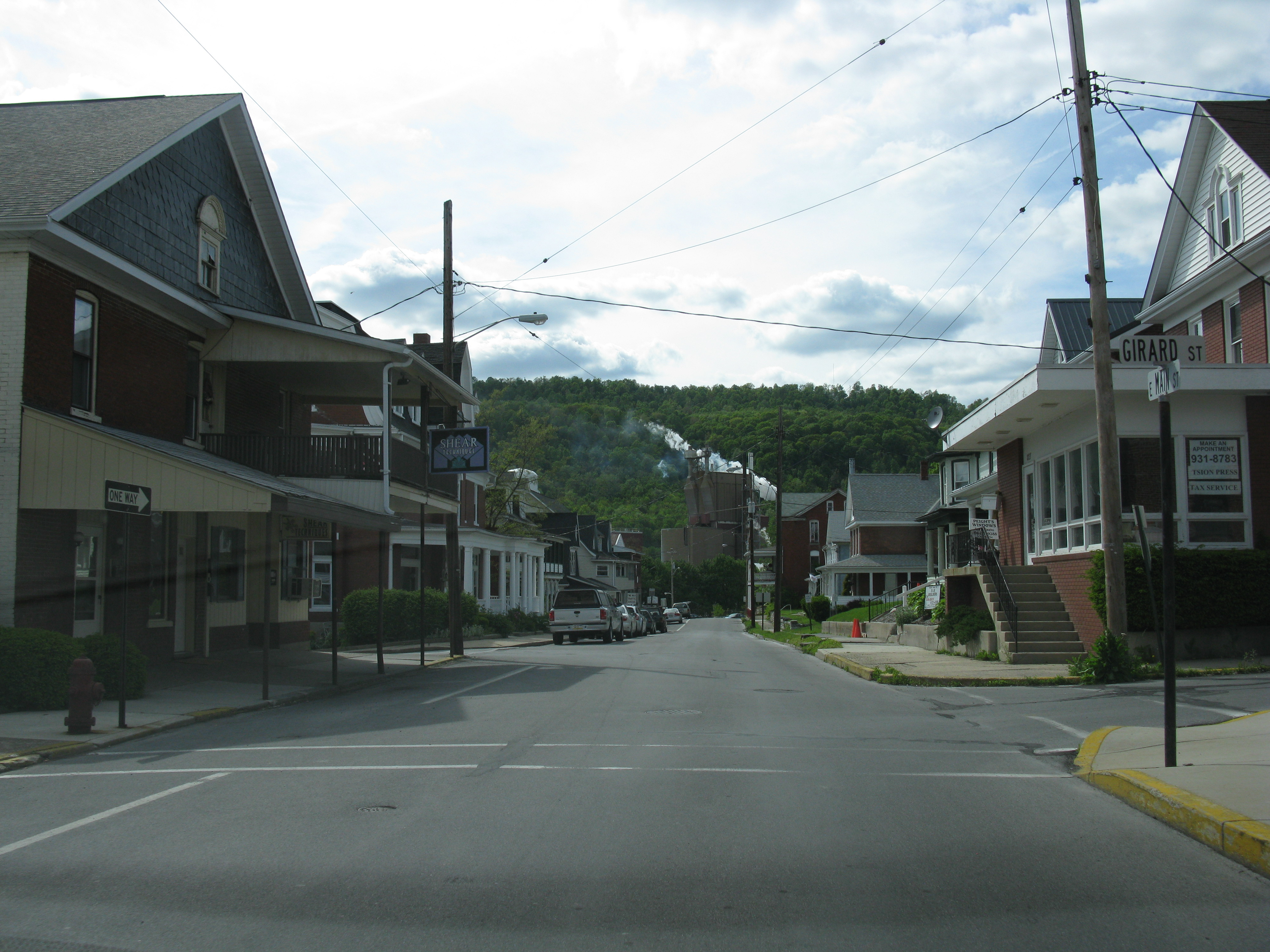
Main Street at Girard Street

Roaring Spring is a borough in Blair County, Pennsylvania, United States. The population was 2,392 at the 2020 census. It is part of the Altoona, PA Metropolitan Statistical Area

== History ==
The Roaring Spring Historic District was listed on the National Register of Historic Places in 1995. Portions of the text below were adapted from a copy of the original nomination document.

Roaring Spring was established around the Big Spring in Morrison's Cove, a clean and dependable water source vital to the operation of a paper mill. Prior to 1866, when the first paper mill was built, Roaring Spring had been a grist mill hamlet with a country store at the intersection of two rural roads that lead to the mill near the spring. A grist mill, powered by the spring water, had operated at that location since at least the 1760s. After 1867, as the paper mill expanded, surrounding tracts of land were acquired to accommodate housing development for new workers. The formalization of a town plan, however, never occurred. As a result, the seemingly random street pattern of the historic district is the product of hilly topography, a small network of pre-existing country roads that converged near the Big Spring, and the property lines of adjacent tracts that were acquired through the years for community expansion. The arterial streets of the district are now East Main, West Main, Spang and Bloomfield, each of which leads out of the borough to surrounding townships. Two of these streets — Spang and East Main — meet with Church Street at the district's main intersection called "Five Points." The boundaries of the district essentially include those portions of Roaring Spring Borough which had been laid out for development by the early 1920s. This area encompasses 233 acres (0.94 km^{2}) or 55 percent of the borough's area of 421 acres (1.70 km^{2}). Since the district's period of significance extends to 1944, most of those buildings erected after the 1920s were built as infill within the areas already subdivided by the 1920s. In the early 1960s, the borough began to annex sections of adjacent Taylor Township, especially to the east around the then new Rt. 36 Bypass.

Daniel Mathias (D. M.) Bare laid out Roaring Spring's first 50 building lots in 1865 after he and two partners decided to locate the region's first paper mill near the spring.[3] These lots were located within and around the so-called village "triangle" defined by West Main, Spang, and East Main Streets. By 1873, the borough contained about 170 lots and 50 buildings, which included the paper and grist mills, three churches, a company store, a schoolhouse, and one hotel. The population stood at about 100. The triangle remained the industrial, commercial and retailing core of the town until 1957 when the bypass of Main Street, PA Rt. 36, was built to the east of town through Taylor Township. As is true of many American small towns, many village merchants along with new businesses have since relocated to the new highway. The village core retains only a few shops and professional offices, but still holds the Roaring Spring Blank Book Company and Roaring Spring Water Bottling Company, all of the historic church buildings, the public library(formerly the Eldon Inn), the borough building, the post office(earlier moved from farther up East Main St.). On the outskirts of the borough, there is a quarry owned and operated by New Enterprise Stone & Lime Co., Inc. The elementary school (former junior-senior high school) was demolished in 2010.

== Geography ==
Roaring Spring is located at 40°20′04″N 78°23′55″W.

According to the United States Census Bureau, the borough has a total area of 0.8 square miles (2.1 km^{2}), all land.

The town features a natural spring, which empties out into a pond, which is known to locals as the Spring Dam. The Spring Dam also contains many large fish. The water is very clear, allowing visitors to see all the way to the bottom of the pond.

== Education ==
It is in the Spring Cove School District.

Roaring Spring is home to the Spring Cove School District administration offices. The school district consists of two elementary schools (Spring Cove Elementary and Martinsburg Elementary), the Spring Cove Middle School and Central High School. The district serves Taylor, Freedom, Huston, and North Woodbury Townships as well as the towns of Roaring Spring and Martinsburg.

== Demographics ==
Historical population
Census	Pop.	Note	%±
1880	489		—
1890	920		88.1%
1900	1,344		46.1%
1910	1,903		41.6%
1920	2,379		25.0%
1930	2,724		14.5%
1940	2,724		0.0%
1950	2,771		1.7%
1960	2,937		6.0%
1970	2,811		−4.3%
1980	2,962		5.4%
1990	2,615		−11.7%
2000	2,418		−7.5%
2010	2,585		6.9%
2020	2,384		−7.8%
2021 (est.)	2,365	▼	−0.8%

As of the census of 2000, there were 2,418 people, 1,019 households, and 706 families residing in the borough. The population density was 3,020.5 inhabitants per square mile (1,166.2/km^{2}). There were 1,087 housing units at an average density of 1,357.8 per square mile (524.2/km^{2}). The racial makeup of the borough was 98.92% White, 0.17% African American, 0.04% Native American, 0.37% Asian, 0.21% Pacific Islander, 0.04% from other races, and 0.25% from two or more races. Hispanic or Latino of any race were 0.04% of the population. In the 2005 population estimate, Roaring Spring had a total population of 2,309, a 4.5% decrease from the 2000 census.

There were 1,019 households, out of which 30.3% had children under the age of 18 living with them, 54.1% were married couples living together, 11.3% had a female householder with no husband present, and 30.7% were non-families. 27.2% of all households were made up of individuals, and 14.5% had someone living alone who was 65 years of age or older. The average household size was 2.37 and the average family size was 2.88.

In the borough the population was spread out, with 22.5% under the age of 18, 9.3% from 18 to 24, 28.0% from 25 to 44, 23.3% from 45 to 64, and 16.8% who were 65 years of age or older. The median age was 38 years. For every 100 females there were 91.9 males. For every 100 females age 18 and over, there were 83.9 males.

The median income for a household in the borough was $35,329, and the median income for a family was $42,370. Males had a median income of $31,643 versus $24,352 for females. The per capita income for the borough was $17,972. About 8.0% of families and 10.2% of the population were below the poverty line, including 17.0% of those under age 18 and 9.5% of those age 65 or over.

== Notable people ==
- Ronald Mallett, physics professor and time-travel theorist
- Erika Sifrit, convicted murderer
