= Spring Cove School District =

School district in Pennsylvania

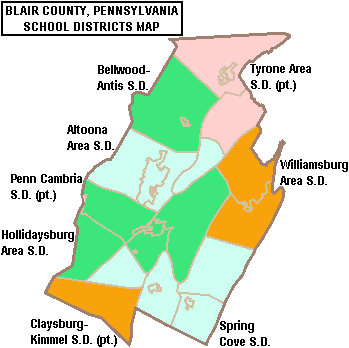

Address
- 1100 East Main Street Roaring Spring, Pennsylvania, 16673; United States

District information
- Type: Public

Students and staff
- District mascot: Dragons
- Colors: Scarlet and Grey

Other information
- Website: https://www.springcovesd.org/

The Spring Cove School District is a small rural, public school district in Blair County, Pennsylvania. It serves the boroughs of Roaring Spring and Martinsburg plus the townships of North Woodbury, Huston, Taylor, and Freedom. Spring Cove School District encompasses approximately 99 square miles (260 km^{2}). According to 2004 local census data, it serves a resident population of 13,333. In 2009, Spring Cove School District residents’ per capita income was $16,356, while the median family income was $41,619. In the Commonwealth, the median family income was $49,501 and the United States median family income was $49,445, in 2010.

== Schools ==
The district operates four schools: Central High School (Gr. 9–12), Spring Cove Middle School (Gr. 6–8) and two Elementary Schools: Martinsburg Elementary School(Gr. 3–5) and Spring Cove Elementary School (Gr. K–2). Additionally, the district operates Spring Cove Cyber School (K–12).

== Extracurriculars ==
The district offers a variety of clubs, activities and many sports.

The list below is the activities according to PIAA directory report in July 2012.

=== Athletics ===
- Baseball - Class AAA
- Basketball - Class AA/AAA
- Cross Country - Class AA
- Football - Class AAA
- Golf - Class AAAA
- Softball - Class AA
- Swimming and Diving - Class AA
- Girls Tennis - Class AA
- Track and Field - Class AA
- Volleyball - Class AA
- Wrestling - Class AA
- Soccer - Class AA

Middle School Sports

Boys

- Baseball
- Basketball
- Football
- Soccer
- Track and Field
- Wrestling

Girls

- Basketball
- Soccer
- Softball
- Track and Field
- Volleyball
