= Martinsburg, Pennsylvania =

Borough in Pennsylvania, US

- Borough
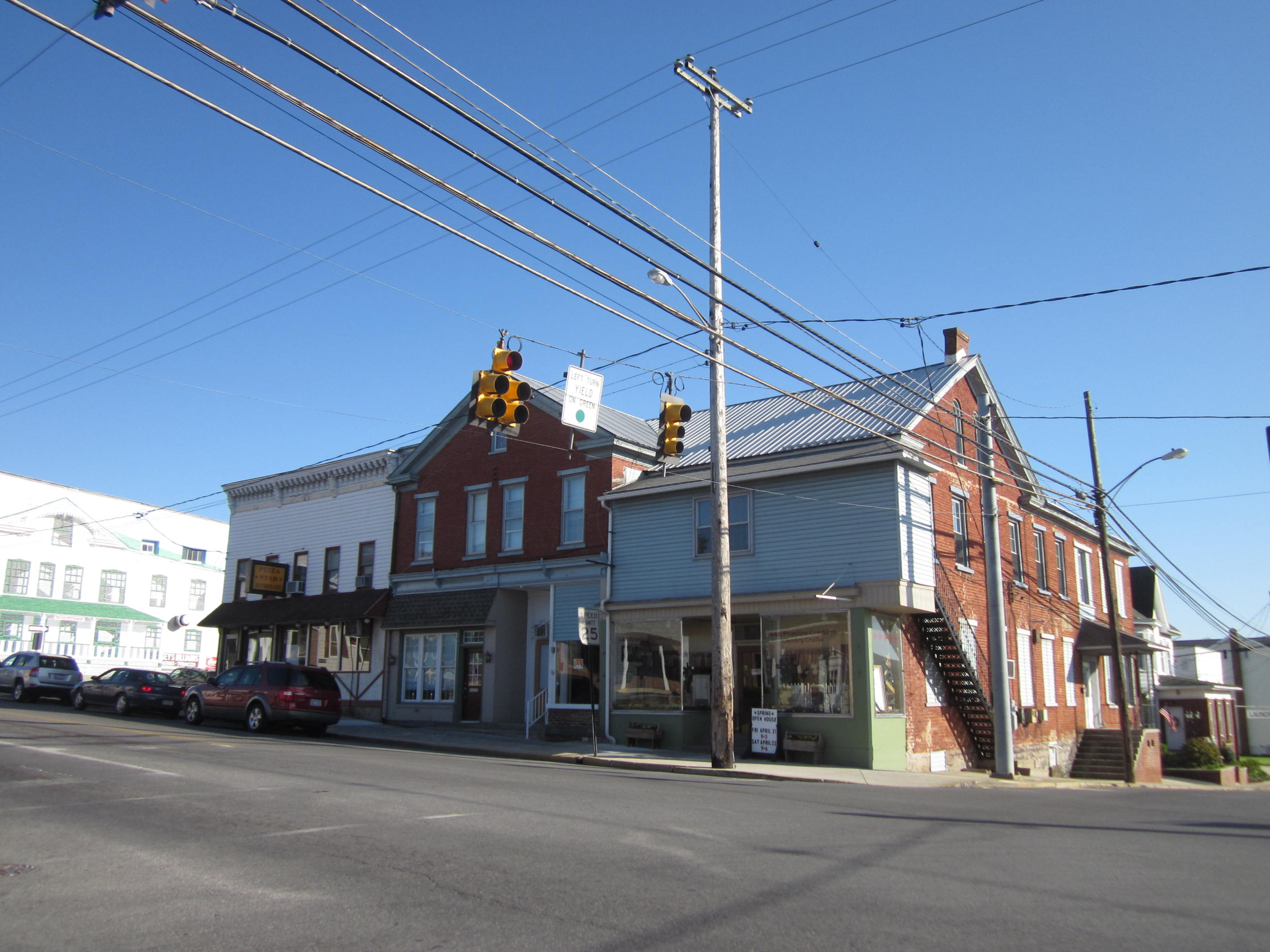
- Downtown Martinsburg
- Motto: "Crossroads to the Cove!"
- Location of Martinsburg in Blair County, Pennsylvania.

- Location within Pennsylvania
- Coordinates: 40°18′38″N 78°19′32″W
- Country: United States
- State: Pennsylvania
- County: Blair
- Settled: 1815
- Incorporated: 1832

Government
  - Type: Borough Council

Area
  - Total: 0.64 sq mi (1.67 km^{2})
  - Land: 0.64 sq mi (1.67 km^{2})
  - Water: 0 sq mi (0.00 km^{2})
- Elevation: 1,404 ft (428 m)

Population (2020)
  - Total: 1,876
  - Density: 2,905.1/sq mi (1,121.68/km^{2})
- Time zone: UTC-5 (Eastern (EST))
  - Summer (DST): UTC-4 (EDT)
- Zip code: 16662
- Area code: 814
- FIPS code: 42-47872
- GNIS feature ID: 1180504
- Website: martinsburgpa.org/home.aspx

Martinsburg is a borough in the Morrisons Cove section of Blair County, Pennsylvania, United States. The population was 1,874 at the 2020 census. It is part of the Altoona, Pennsylvania Metropolitan Statistical Area.

== History ==
The community was named after John Martin, a pioneer citizen.

== Geography ==
According to the United States Census Bureau, the borough has a total area of 0.6 square miles (1.6 km^{2}), all land.

== Demographics ==
Historical population
Census	Pop.	Note	%±
1840	442		—
1850	442		0.0%
1860	464		5.0%
1870	536		15.5%
1880	567		5.8%
1890	588		3.7%
1900	590		0.3%
1910	920		55.9%
1920	955		3.8%
1930	1,295		35.6%
1940	1,396		7.8%
1950	1,562		11.9%
1960	1,772		13.4%
1970	2,088		17.8%
1980	2,231		6.8%
1990	2,119		−5.0%
2000	2,236		5.5%
2010	1,958		−12.4%
2020	1,876		−4.2%
2021 (est.)	1,855	▼	−1.1%

As of the census of 2000, there were 2,236 people, 892 households, and 544 families residing in the borough. The population density was 3,544.3 inhabitants per square mile (1,368.5/km^{2}). There were 924 housing units at an average density of 1,464.6 per square mile (565.5/km^{2}). The racial makeup of the borough was 99.46% White, 0.09% Native American, 0.04% Asian, 0.04% from other races, and 0.36% from two or more races. Hispanic or Latino of any race were 0.36% of the population.

There were 892 households, out of which 26.3% had children under the age of 18 living with them, 49.0% were married couples living together, 9.3% had a female householder with no husband present, and 39.0% were non-families. 35.9% of all households were made up of individuals, and 20.2% had someone living alone who was 65 years of age or older. The average household size was 2.19 and the average family size was 2.85.

In the borough the population was spread out, with 18.8% under the age of 18, 5.5% from 18 to 24, 24.2% from 25 to 44, 19.2% from 45 to 64, and 32.2% who were 65 years of age or older. The median age was 46 years. For every 100 females there were 77.9 males. For every 100 females age 18 and over, there were 69.7 males.

The median income for a household in the borough was $27,125, and the median income for a family was $36,797. Males had a median income of $25,096 versus $19,226 for females. The per capita income for the borough was $14,678. About 10.6% of families and 13.2% of the population were below the poverty line, including 20.7% of those under age 18 and 7.9% of those age 65 or over.

== Education ==
It is in the Spring Cove School District.
