= List of PIAA basketball state champions =

The following is a list of PIAA basketball state champions for boys and girls' basketball for each division sanctioned by the Pennsylvania Interscholastic Athletic Association. Divisions are organized by class enrollment size from the smallest (1A) to the largest (6A). Divisions 5A and 6A began in 2017.

== List of Champions ==
=== Boys basketball ===
Class 6A

- 2026: Central Dauphin High School (District 3) over Imhotep Charter (District 12) 52–49
- 2025: Father Judge High School (District 12) over Roman Catholic (District 12) 71–60
- 2024: Central York High School (District 3) over Parkland High School (District 11) 53–51
- 2023: Reading Senior High School (District 3) over Roman Catholic (District 12) 63–56 (OT)
- 2022: Roman Catholic (District 12) over Archbishop Wood (District 12) 77–65
- 2021: Reading Senior High School (District 3) over Archbishop Wood (District 12) 58–57 (2OT)
- 2019: Kennedy Catholic (District 10) over Pennridge (District 1) 64–62 (2OT)
- 2018: Roman Catholic (District 12) over Lincoln (District 12) 92–80
- 2017: Reading Senior High School (District 3) over Pine-Richland (District 7) 64–60

Class 5A

- 2026: Monsignor Bonner (District 12) over West York (District 3) 62–35
- 2025: Neumann Goretti (District 12) over Hershey (District 3) 85–71
- 2024: Imhotep Charter (District 12) over Franklin Regional (District 7) 59–48
- 2023: Imhotep Charter (District 12) over Exeter Township (District 3) 78–40
- 2022: Imhotep Charter (District 12) over New Castle (District 7) 54–39
- 2021: Cathedral Prep (District 10) over Archbishop Ryan (District 12) 69–49
- 2019: Moon Area (District 7) over Archbishop Wood (District 12) 74–64
- 2018: Abington Heights (District 2) over Mars (District 7) 67–55
- 2017: Archbishop Wood (District 12) over Meadville (District 10) 73–40

Class 4A

- 2026: Devon Prep (District 12) over Obama Academy (District 8) 58–41
- 2025: Devon Prep (District 12) over Berks Catholic (District 3) 55–39
- 2024: Lincoln Park (District 7) over Archbishop Carroll (District 12) 80–50
- 2023: Lincoln Park (District 7) over Neumann Goretti (District 12) 62–58
- 2022: Neumann Goretti (District 12) over Quaker Valley (District 7) 93–68
- 2021: Allentown Central Catholic (District 11) over Hickory (District 10) 41–40
- 2019: Imhotep Charter (District 12) over Bonner-Prendergast (District 12) 67–56
- 2018: Imhotep Charter (District 12) over Sharon (District 10) 71–35
- 2017: Imhotep Charter (District 12) over Strong Vincent (District 10) 80–52
- 2016: Roman Catholic (District 12) over Taylor Allderdice (District 8) 73–62
- 2015: Roman Catholic (District 12) over Martin Luther King (District 12) 62–45
- 2014: New Castle (District 7) over LaSalle College (District 12) 52–39
- 2013: Lower Merion (District 1) over Chester (District 1) 63–47
- 2012: Chester (District 1) over Lower Merion (District 1) 59–33
- 2011: Chester (District 1) over Mount Lebanon (District 7) 72-60 (OT)
- 2010: Plymouth-Whitemarsh (District 1) over Penn Wood (District 1) 58–51
- 2009: Penn Wood (District 1) over William Penn (District 12) 72–53
- 2008: Chester (District 1) over Norristown (District 1) 81–77
- 2007: Schenley (District 8) over Chester (District 1) 78–71
- 2006: Lower Merion (District 1) over Schenley (District 8) 60–58
- 2005: Chester (District 1) over Lower Merion (District 1) 74–61
- 2004: Penn Hills (District 7) over Parkland (District 11) 57–48
- 2003: State College (District 6) over Chester (District 1) 76–71
- 2002: Harrisburg (District 3) over Uniontown (District 7) 69–62
- 2001: Coatesville (District 1) over Schenley (District 8) 70–57
- 2000: Chester (District 1) over Uniontown (District 7) 73–48

Class 3A

- 2019: Lincoln Park Charter (District 7) over Trinity (District 3) 73–72
- 2018: Neumann-Goretti (District 12) over Richland (District 6) 57–42
- 2017: Neumann-Goretti (District 12) over Lincoln Park Charter (District 7) 89–58
- 2016: Neumann-Goretti (District 12) over Mars (District 7) 99–66
- 2015: Neumann-Goretti (District 12) over Archbishop Carroll (District 12) 69–67
- 2014: Neumann-Goretti (District 12) over Susquehanna (District 3) 64-57 (OT)
- 2013: Imhotep Charter (District 12) over Archbishop Carroll (District 12) 54–45
- 2012: Neumann-Goretti (District 12) over Montour (District 7) 48–45
- 2011: Neumann-Goretti (District 12) over Montour (District 7) 55–45
- 2010: Neumann-Goretti (District 12) over Chartiers Valley (District 7) 65–63
- 2009: Archbishop Carroll (District 12) over Greensburg-Salem (District 7) 75–54
- 2008: Steelton-Highspire (District 3) over Susquehanna (District 3) 65–62
- 2007: General McLane (District 10) over Greencastle-Antrim (District 3) 57–55
- 2006: Franklin Area (District 10) Communications Tech (District 12) 74–63
- 2005: Steelton-Highspire (District 3) over Johnstown (District 6) 70–48
- 2004: Moon Area (District 7) over Holy Ghost Prep (District 1) 52–50
- 2003: Lancaster Catholic (District 3) over Perry Traditional Academy (District 8) 75–59
- 2002: Kennett (District 1) over West Mifflin (District 7) 72–51
- 2001: Franklin Area (District 10) over Allentown Central Catholic (District 11) 58-50 (OT)
- 2000: Steelton-Highspire (District 3) over Blackhawk (District 7) 68–56

Class 2A

- 2019: MCS Charter (District 12) over Bishop Guilfoyle (District 6) 54–52
- 2018: Constitution (District 12) over Our Lady of the Sacred Heart (District 7) 81–71
- 2017: Sewickley Academy (District 7) over Constitution (District 12) 68-63 (OT)
- 2016: Aliquippa (District 7) over Mastery Charter North (District 12) 68–49
- 2015: Conwell–Egan (District 12) over Aliquippa (District 7) 62–51
- 2014: Constitution (District 12) over Seton-La Salle (District 7) 61–59
- 2013: Beaver Falls (District 7) over Holy Cross (District 2) 69–63
- 2012: Imhotep Charter (District 12) over Beaver Falls (District 7) 56–54
- 2011: Imhotep Charter (District 12) over Greensburg Central Catholic (District 7) 67–34
- 2010: South Fayette (District 7) over Strawberry Mansion (District 12) 49–47
- 2009: Imhotep Charter (District 12) over North Catholic (District 7) 75-67 (2OT)
- 2008: Jeannette (District 7) over Strawberry Mansion (District 12) 76–72
- 2007: Prep Charter (District 12) over Aliquippa (District 7) 68–66
- 2006: Prep Charter (District 12) over Beaver Falls (District 7) 82–51
- 2005: Beaver Falls (District 7) over York Catholic (District 3) 71–59
- 2004: Sto-Rox (District 7) over Trinity (District 3) 62–53
- 2003: Trinity (District 3) over Sto-Rox (District 7) 66–49
- 2002: Bishop Hannan (District 2) over Sto-Rox (District 7) 70–68
- 2001: Trinity (District 3) over Aliquippa (District 7) 79–65
- 2000: Shady Side Academy (District 7) over Halifax (District 3) 79–65

Class 1A

- 2019: Sankofa Freedom Academy (District 12) over Vincentian Academy (District 7) 83–61
- 2018: Kennedy Catholic (District 10) over Lourdes Regional (District 4) 78–36
- 2017: Kennedy Catholic (District 10) over Girard College (District 1) 73–56
- 2016: Kennedy Catholic (District 10) over MCS Charter (District 12) 71–60
- 2015: Constitution (District 12) over Farrell (District 10) 85–53
- 2014: Lincoln Park Charter (District 7) over MCS Charter (District 12) 70–66
- 2013: Vaux (District 12) over Johnsonburg (District 9) 83–63
- 2012: Constitution (District 12) over Lincoln Park Charter (District 7) 68–46
- 2011: MCS Charter (District 12) over Lincoln Park Charter (District 7) 70–55
- 2010: Sewickley Academy (District 7) over Reading Central Catholic (District 3) 43–35
- 2009: Girard College (District 1) over Kennedy Catholic (District 10) 80–70
- 2008: Serra Catholic (District 7) over Friere Charter (District 12) 67–66
- 2007: Reading Central Catholic (District 3) over DuBois Central Catholic (District 9) 58–33
- 2006: Elk County Catholic (District 9) over Bishop Hannan (District 2) 71–61
- 2005: Bishop O'Reilly (District 2) over Kennedy Catholic (District 10) 65–61
- 2004: Bishop O'Reilly (District 2) over Sewickley Academy (District 7) 70–54
- 2003: Scotland School (District 3) over Union Area (District 7) 80–59
- 2002: Scotland School (District 3) over Kennedy Catholic (District 10) 69–50
- 2001: Kennedy Christian (District 10) over Fairfield (District 3) 87–45
- 2000: Kennedy Christian (District 10) over Bishop Hannan (District 2) 64-57 (OT)

=== Girls' basketball ===
Class 6A

- 2019: Peters Township (District 7) over Garnet Valley (District 1) 62–49
- 2018: Upper Dublin (District 1) over Central Bucks South (District 1) 41–39
- 2017: Boyertown (District 1) over North Allegheny (District 7) 46–35

Class 5A

- 2019: Chartiers Valley (District 7) over Archbishop Carroll (District 12) 53–40
- 2018: Mars (District 7) over Archbishop Wood (District 12) 36–33
- 2017: Archbishop Wood (District 12) over Trinity (District 7) 34–26

Class 4A

- 2019: Bethlehem Catholic (District 11) over North Catholic High School (District 7) 60–49
- 2018: Lancaster Catholic (District 3) over Berks Catholic (District 3) 51–36
- 2017: Bethlehem Catholic (District 11) over Villa Maria (District 10) 46–27
- 2016: Cumberland Valley (District 3) over Cardinal O'Hara (District 12) 57–34
- 2015: Cumberland Valley (District 3) over Central Bucks West (District 1) 40–35
- 2014: Cumberland Valley (District 3) over Spring-Ford (District 1) 49–30
- 2013: Spring-Ford (District 1) over Cumberland Valley (District 3) 60–45
- 2012: Archbishop Carroll (District 12) over Oakland Catholic (District 7) 56–37
- 2011: Mount Lebanon (District 7) over Archbishop Carroll (District 12) 47–46
- 2010: Mount Lebanon (District 7) over Archbishop Ryan (District 12) 70–43
- 2009: Mount Lebanon (District 7) over Cardinal O'Hara (District 12) 67–58
- 2008: Central Dauphin (District 3) over Mount Lebanon (District 7) 56–49

Class 3A

- 2019: Delone Catholic (District 3) over Dunmore (District 2) 49–43
- 2018: Neumann-Goretti (District 12) over Bishop Canevin (District 7) 63–46
- 2017: Neumann-Goretti (District 12) over Bishop Canevin (District 7) 62–56
- 2016: Archbishop Wood (District 12) over Villa Maria (District 10) 46–29
- 2015: Blackhawk (District 7) over Archbishop Wood (District 12) 46–40
- 2014: Blackhawk (District 7) over Archbishop Wood (District 12) 51–43
- 2013: South Park (District 7) over Bethlehem Catholic (District 11) 53–38
- 2012: Archbishop Wood (District 12) over Lancaster Catholic (District 3) 52–33
- 2011: Archbishop Wood (District 12) over Mercyhurst Prep (District 10) 53–41
- 2010: Archbishop Wood (District 12) over Indiana (District 7) 49–39
- 2009: Archbishop Carroll (District 12) over Lampeter-Strasburg (District 3) 68–45
- 2008: Mount Saint Joseph Academy (District 1) over Mercyhurst Prep (District 10) 53–43

Class 2A

- 2019: Bellwood-Antis (District 6) over West Middlesex (District 10) 66–57
- 2018: Bellwood-Antis (District 6) over West Catholic (District 12) 45–42
- 2017: Minersville (District 11) over Bishop McCort (District 6) 63–49
- 2016: Neumann-Goretti (District 12) over North Star (District 5) 65–28
- 2015: Neumann-Goretti (District 12) over Seton-La Salle (District 7) 79–34
- 2014: Seton-La Salle (District 7) over Neumann-Goretti (District 12) 58–50
- 2013: Bishop Canevin (District 7) over York Catholic (District 3) 45–38
- 2012: Seton-La Salle (District 7) over York Catholic (District 3) 71–47
- 2011: Villa Maria (District 10) over Dunmore (District 2) 62–39
- 2010: Villa Maria (District 10) over York Catholic (District 3) 52–44
- 2009: Villa Maria (District 10) over York Catholic (District 3) 56–51
- 2008: York Catholic (District 3) over Northern Cambria (District 6) 52–40

Class 1A

- 2019: Berlin Brothersvalley (District 5) over Lourdes Regional (District 4) 41–32
- 2018: Jenkintown (District 1) over Juniata Valley (District 6) 51-46 (OT)
- 2017: Lebanon Catholic (District 3) over Juniata Valley (District 6) 55–43
- 2016: North Catholic (District 7) over Lourdes Regional (District 4) 56–33
- 2015: Vincentian Academy (District 7) over Old Forge (District 2) 86–38
- 2014: Vincentian Academy (District 7) over Old Forge (District 2) 58–34
- 2013: Tri-Valley (District 11) over Vincentian Academy (District 7) 59–42
- 2012: Steelton-Highspire (District 3) over North Catholic (District 7) 66–59
- 2011: Steelton-Highspire (District 3) over Bishop Guilfoyle (District 6) 73–60
- 2010: Bishop Guilfoyle (District 6) over Northern Cambria (District 6) 49–29
- 2009: Bishop Guilfoyle (District 6) over Nativity BVM (District 11) 49–27
- 2008: Marian Catholic (District 11) over Mount Alvernia (District 7) 40-34

== See also ==
- List of PIAA football state champions
