= Christian Kuntz =

American football player (born 1994)

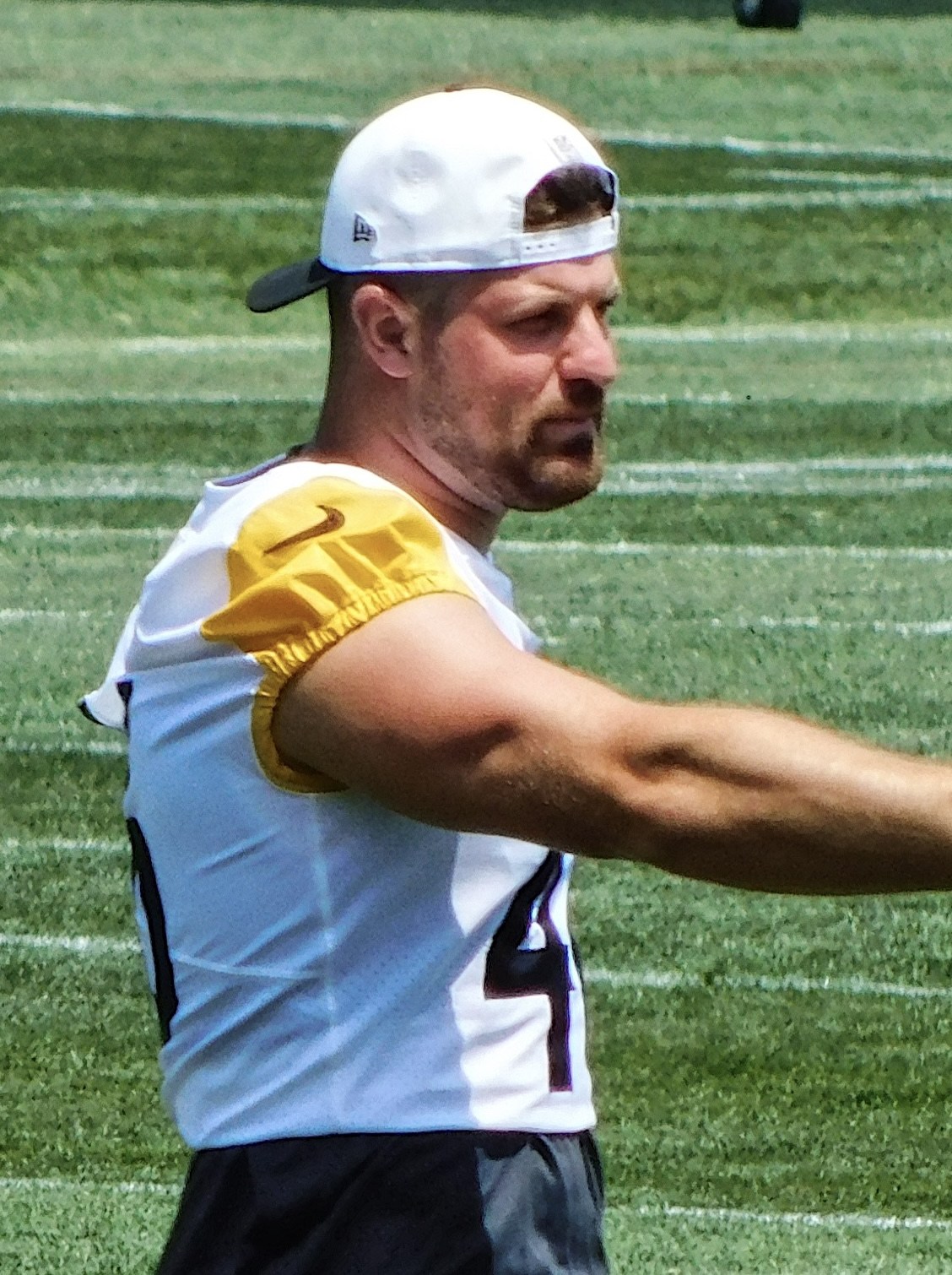
- Kuntz with the Pittsburgh Steelers in 2025

No. 46 – Pittsburgh Steelers
- Position: Long snapper
- Roster status: Active

Personal information
- Born: April 13, 1994 (age 32); Scott Township, Pennsylvania, U.S.
- Listed height: 6 ft 1 in (1.85 m)
- Listed weight: 228 lb (103 kg)

Career information
- High school: Chartiers Valley (Bridgeville, Pennsylvania)
- College: Duquesne (2012–2016)
- NFL draft: 2017: undrafted

Career history
- New England Patriots (2017)*; Denver Broncos (2018)*; Jacksonville Jaguars (2018)*; Pittsburgh Steelers (2019)*; Dallas Renegades (2020); Pittsburgh Steelers (2020–present)
- * Offseason or practice squad member only

Career NFL statistics as of Week 8, 2026
- Games played: 93
- Total tackles: 12
- Stats at Pro Football Reference

Christian Kuntz (born April 13, 1994) is an American professional football long snapper for the Pittsburgh Steelers of the National Football League (NFL). He played college football for the Duquesne Dukes.

== Early life ==
Kuntz is the son of Kathy and Theo Kuntz and he has two brothers, Jimmy and Louis. He attended Chartiers Valley High School in Pennsylvania, where he played basketball and football. Kuntz suffered a ruptured spleen prior to his senior season of football, forcing him to miss the season. On the basketball court, he won a WPIAL title alongside future NBA player and friend T. J. McConnell.

== College career ==
Kuntz played linebacker at Duquesne. During his sophomore season, he tore his ACL. As a junior, he had 26 tackles for loss, 10 sacks, six pass breakups and four interceptions. Kuntz recorded 24 tackles for loss and 11.5 sacks in his senior season. He finished his collegiate career with a school-record 30.5 sacks and his 71.5 career tackles for loss rank sixth all-time on the Football Championship Subdivision list. Kuntz was named a second-team Associated Press All-American in 2015 and 2016, and he was a two-time Northeast Conference Defensive Player of the Year honoree. Kuntz finished 12th in the voting for the 2016 Buck Buchanan Award.

== Professional career ==
Pre-draft measurables
Height	Weight	Arm length	Hand span	Wingspan	40-yard dash	10-yard split	20-yard split	20-yard shuttle	Three-cone drill	Vertical jump	Broad jump	Bench press
6 ft 1 1/4 in (1.86 m)	230 lb (104 kg)	31 1/2 in (0.80 m)	9 5/8 in (0.24 m)	6 ft 2 1/8 in (1.88 m)	4.76 s	1.65 s	2.78 s	4.28 s	6.81 s	32.0 in (0.81 m)	9 ft 8 in (2.95 m)	24 reps
All values from Pro Day

=== New England Patriots ===
After going undrafted in 2017, Kuntz was signed by the New England Patriots on August 28, 2017. He was waived the following day. After his experience with the Patriots, Kuntz decided to focus more on being a long snapper.

=== Denver Broncos ===
Kuntz was signed by the Denver Broncos on March 21, 2018. He was waived by the Broncos on June 14.

=== Jacksonville Jaguars ===
The Jacksonville Jaguars signed him to their practice squad on December 17. Kuntz signed a futures contract with the Jaguars on December 31. He was waived by Jacksonville on June 13, 2019.

=== Pittsburgh Steelers (first stint) ===
Kuntz was signed by the Pittsburgh Steelers on August 15, 2019. He played in the preseason finale against the Carolina Panthers and had five tackles and a sack. Kuntz was waived during final roster cuts on August 31.

=== Dallas Renegades ===
His performance in the preseason drew the attention of former Dallas Cowboys fullback Daryl Johnston, the director of player personnel of the Dallas Renegades of the XFL. Johnston was impressed by Kuntz's abilities as a long snapper and he suggested to assistant coach Kenny Perry that they sign him as a long snapper. Even though the Renegades already had a long snapper, Kuntz got the job due to his superior coverage abilities. Five games into the season, the XFL season was canceled due to the COVID-19 pandemic. He had his contract terminated when the league suspended operations on April 10, 2020.

=== Pittsburgh Steelers (second stint) ===
Kunt (46) with kicker Chris Boswell (9) and punter Cameron Johnston (19) in 2026

Kuntz was signed by the Steelers on March 30, 2020. He was waived on August 2.

Kuntz had a tryout with the Houston Texans on August 20, 2020, and with the Indianapolis Colts on August 23. On November 24, the Steelers signed Kuntz to their practice squad. He was released on December 23, and re-signed to the practice squad on December 29. Kuntz was again released on January 6, 2021. On January 14, Kuntz signed a reserve/futures contract with the Steelers.

On February 22, 2023, Kuntz re-signed with the Steelers on a one-year contract.

On March 14, 2024, Kuntz signed a three-year contract extension with the Steelers.

== Personal life ==
He married his wife, Heather McGlothlin, in 2024. Their son was born in 2025.
