= Wooga Poplar =

American basketball player (born 2003)

Free agent
- Position: Shooting guard

Personal information
- Born: January 5, 2003 (age 23) Philadelphia, Pennsylvania, U.S.
- Listed height: 6 ft 5 in (1.96 m)
- Listed weight: 197 lb (89 kg)

Career information
- High school: MCSCS (Philadelphia, Pennsylvania)
- College: Miami (Florida) (2021–2024); Villanova (2024–2025)
- NBA draft: 2025: undrafted
- Playing career: 2025–present

Career history
- 2025–2026: Windy City Bulls

Career highlights
- Third-team All-Big East (2025)
- Stats at NBA.com
- Stats at Basketball Reference

Nisine Hamir "Wooga" Poplar (born January 5, 2003) is an American professional basketball player who last played for the Windy City Bulls of the NBA G League. He played college basketball for the Miami Hurricanes and the Villanova Wildcats.

== High school career ==
Poplar attended the Mathematics, Civics and Sciences Charter School in Philadelphia, Pennsylvania. He began playing organised basketball as a sophomore, averaging 14.5 points a game and being named to the 2A All-State Second-Team. As a junior, he averaged 22.0 points and 5.0 rebounds, earning PIAA 2A Player of the Year as well as leading MCSCS to their first Philadelphia Public League championship, recording 23 points, 6 rebounds and 3 assists in the title game to win MVP. He also led the team to a PIAA state title. In his senior year, Poplar was named to the 3A All-State First Team and led the team to the state semifinals.

=== Recruiting ===
Poplar was considered a four-star recruit by Rivals and 247Sports, and a three-star recruit by ESPN. On September 15, 2020, Poplar committed to playing college basketball for Miami over offers from Auburn, Georgia, Maryland, Penn State and Seton Hall.

College recruiting
Name	Hometown	School	Height	Weight	Commit date
Wooga Poplar; SG	Philadelphia, PA	Mathematics, Civics and Sciences Charter School (PA)	6 ft 4 in (1.93 m)	185 lb (84 kg)	Sep 15, 2020
Wooga Poplar; SG	Recruit ratings: Rivals: 247Sports: ESPN: (79)				
Overall recruit ranking: Rivals: 78 247Sports: 123
Note: In many cases, Scout, Rivals, 247Sports, On3, and ESPN may conflict in their listings of height and weight.; In these cases, the average was taken. ESPN grades are on a 100-point scale.; Sources: "2021 Miami Basketball Commitments". Rivals.; "2021 Miami Hurricanes recruiting class". ESPN.; "2021 Team Ranking". Rivals.

== College career ==
During his freshman season at Miami, Poplar played with future NBA players Jordan Miller and Isaiah Wong, as the Hurricanes advanced to their first Elite Eight in program history. Poplar saw a larger role in his sophomore season, starting 36 of the 37 games he played in and averaged 8.4 points in 23.5 minutes per game. On March 26, 2023, he scored 16 points in a 88–81 Elite Eight win against Texas, helping the Hurricanes reach their first Final Four in program history. In his junior season, Poplar started all 29 games he played, averaging 13.1 points per game and recording three double-doubles. On December 16, 2023, he scored a then career-high 25 points in a 84–77 win over La Salle. Poplar entered the 2024 NBA draft and the transfer portal before ultimately withdrawing from the draft.

On June 5, 2024, Poplar committed to Villanova for his senior season. He averaged a career-high 15.3 points per game, second on the team behind Eric Dixon, as well as leading the Wildcats in rebounding with 7.0 rebounds per game. He was named to the All-Big East Third Team. On March 13, 2025, Poplar led the Wildcats in scoring with 25 points in a 73–56 loss against UConn in the Big East tournament quarterfinals. On April 3, he scored a career-high 32 points along with 11 rebounds in a 104–98 overtime loss against UCF in the Crown tournament semifinals.

== Professional career ==
=== Windy City Bulls (2025–2026) ===
After going undrafted in the 2025 NBA draft, Poplar joined the Chicago Bulls for the 2025 NBA Summer League. Poplar signed an Exhibit 10 deal with the Bulls on July 6, 2025. He was waived on September 25. On November 7, 2025, Poplar was announced as part of the opening night roster of the Windy City Bulls of the NBA G League.

On October 16, 2026, the Long Island Nets acquired the returning player rights to Poplar.

== Career statistics ==
Legend
GP	Games played	GS	Games started	MPG	Minutes per game
FG%	Field goal percentage	3P%	3-point field goal percentage	FT%	Free throw percentage
RPG	Rebounds per game	APG	Assists per game	SPG	Steals per game
BPG	Blocks per game	PPG	Points per game	**Bold**	Career high

=== College ===
Year	Team	GP	GS	MPG	FG%	3P%	FT%	RPG	APG	SPG	BPG	PPG
2021–22	Miami	34	0	8.6	.412	.214	.654	1.4	.3	.3	.0	2.3
2022–23	Miami	**37**	**36**	23.5	**.470**	.375	**.867**	3.3	1.5	1.1	0.2	8.4
2023–24	Miami	29	29	31.1	.426	.385	.864	4.8	**2.1**	0.8	**0.3**	13.1
2024–25	Villanova	36	34	**31.9**	.460	**.387**	.856	**7.0**	1.5	**1.3**	**0.3**	**15.3**
