= Ventrone =

Ventrone is a surname. Notable people with the surname include:

- Raymond Ventrone (born 1982), American football player
- Ross Ventrone (born 1986), American football player
