= Glendale, Pennsylvania =

- Unincorporated community Census designated place
- Location within Pennsylvania Location within the United States
- Coordinates: 40°16′26.4″N 79°52′30.0″W
- Country: United States
- State: Pennsylvania
- County: Allegheny
- Township: Scott
- Elevation: 856 ft (261 m)

Population
  - Estimate (2023): 1,420
- Time zone: UTC-5 (Eastern (EST))
  - Summer (DST): UTC-4 (EDT)
- GNIS feature ID: 2830797

Glendale, Pennsylvania is an unincorporated community and census designated place (CDP) in Scott Township, Allegheny County, in the U.S. state of Pennsylvania.

== Demographics ==
Historical population
Census	Pop.	Note	%±
2023 (est.)	1,420

The United States Census Bureau defined Glendale as a census designated place in 2023.
