= MAHS =

MAHS may refer to:

- Meath Archaeological and Historical Society in County Meath, Ireland

== Schools ==
- Brimm Medical Arts High School, Camden, New Jersey, United States
- Manual Arts High School, Los Angeles, California, United States
- Maywood Academy High School, Maywood, California, United States
- Menlo-Atherton High School, Atherton, California, United States
- Moon Area High School, Moon Township, Pennsylvania, United States
- Mount Alvernia High School, Newton, Massachusetts, United States
- Mount Alvernia High School (Pittsburgh), Pittsburgh, Pennsylvania, United States
- Munich American High School, a closed United States Department of Defense Dependents Schools system school in Munich, Germany
