= Chartiers Valley High School =

Public school in Pennsylvania, United States (established in 1959)

Location
- 50 Thoms Run Road; Bridgeville, Pennsylvania 15017; United States; 40.3800°N 80.1028°W

Information
- Type: Public
- Established: 1959; 67 years ago
- School district: Chartiers Valley School District
- Principal: Lesley Krasman
- Staff: 63.27 (FTE)
- Grades: 9–12
- Enrollment: 981 (2023–2024)
- Student to teacher ratio: 15.50
- Colors: Red and blue
- Athletics: Baseball; Boys basketball Girls basketball Boys cross country Girls cross country Football; Coed golf Boys ice hockey Boys indoor track Girls indoor track Boys lacrosse Girls lacrosse Boys soccer Girls soccer Girls softball Boys swimming Girls swimming Boys tennis Girls tennis Boys track & field Girls track & field Wrestling; Girls volleyball
- Athletics conference: WPIAL (PIAA District 7)
- Mascot: Colt
- Website: hs.cvsd.net

Chartiers Valley High School is a public school that was established in 1959 and is physically located in Collier Township, Allegheny County, Pennsylvania, United States. However, the school's post office address is Bridgeville, Pennsylvania. The school district serves Collier Township, Bridgeville Borough, Scott Township and Heidelberg Borough.

A new high school and middle school complex is being constructed at the site. The new complex will retain its gymnasium, pool and auditorium. The school has an olympic-size indoor swimming pool which is open to the public three evenings a week. A small fee is charged to district residents and non-residents. The school's on-site stadium was home to the professional soccer team Pittsburgh Riverhounds (2008–2012).

The school district is named for Chartiers Creek, which flows through and/or forms part of the border for all four regions (Bridgeville, Collier, Heidelberg, and Scott) the district serves. The creek itself is named after Pierre Chartier.

== AP courses ==
Chartiers Valley High School offers the following Advanced Placement courses:

- AP English Language and Composition
- AP English Literature and Composition
- AP Seminar (Capstone)
- AP Research (Capstone)
- AP Computer Science Principles
- AP Computer Science A (Java)
- AP Microeconomics
- AP Psychology
- AP United States History
- AP Macroeconomics
- AP Government & Politics
- AP Chemistry
- AP Calculus AB
- AP Calculus BC
- AP Statistics
- AP Physics 1
- AP Physics 2
- AP Physics C: Mechanics
- AP Physics C: Electricity and Magnetism
- AP Biology
- AP Spanish
- AP Studio Art
- AP Digital Art (2D & 3D)

== Awards and recognition ==
In 2007, Chartiers Valley High School's Art Program was awarded the Pennsylvania State Modern Language Association's Silver Globe Award. The School had previously been awarded a Bronze Globe Award in 2005.

Also in 2005, Chartiers Valley's musical Beauty and the Beast won five awards at the 15th annual Gene Kelly Awards for Excellence in High School Musical Theater.

== Student body demographics ==
As of 2005:

Subset	Number of students	Percent
All	1,142	100%
White	1,067	93.4%
African American	39	3.5%
Asian	30	2.6%
Hispanic	6	0.5%
Multiracial	0	0%
American Indian	0	0%
Male	606	53.1%
Female	536	46.9%

== Athletics ==
State championships

2019 Girls Basketball: Victory over Radnor Archbishop Carroll 53-40 (AAAAA).

1986 Ice Hockey: Victory over Warminster Archbishop Wood 7-2 (AA).

State runners-up

2022 Girls Basketball: In a rematch of last year's finals, again defeated by Springfield Cardinal O'Hara 42-19 (AAAAA).

2021 Girls Basketball: Defeated by Springfield Cardinal O'Hara 51-27 (AAAAA). This team set a STATE RECORD for 63 consecutive wins from 2019 to 2021 (no state championship game in 2020 due to Covid cancellations).

2010 Boys Basketball: Defeated by Philadelphia Neuman-Goretti 65-63 (AAAAA).

2009 Baseball: Defeated by Clarks Summit Abington Heights 3-2 (AAA).

2002 Boys Soccer: Defeated by West Chester Henderson 2-1 (AAA)

1998 Boys Basketball: Defeated by Harrisburg Steelton-Highspire 69-45 (AAA).

== Notable alumni ==
- (1965) Donna Feigley Barbisch, U.S. Army major general
- (1968) Joseph Markosek, representative for Pennsylvania's 25th Representative District in the Pennsylvania House of Representatives
- (1976) Kenneth Merchant, U.S. Air Force Major General
- (1983) Dave Kasper, general manager of D.C. United
- (1983) Bill Peduto, mayor of Pittsburgh
- (2000) Gregg Gillis, (stage name, Girl Talk) musician
- (2001) Ray Ventrone, former football player for the NFL
- (2004) Travis MacKenzie, soccer player for Pittsburgh Riverhounds
- (2005) Adam Gazda, soccer player for Pittsburgh Riverhounds
- (2005) Tom Wallisch, professional skier
- (2005) Ross Ventrone, former football player for the NFL
- (2006) Tino Coury, pop singer
- (2009) Eric Kush, football player
- (2010) T. J. McConnell, basketball player, Indiana Pacers
- (2013) Christian Kuntz, football player
- (2020) Megan McConnell, WNBA player
