= Vincentian Sisters of Charity =

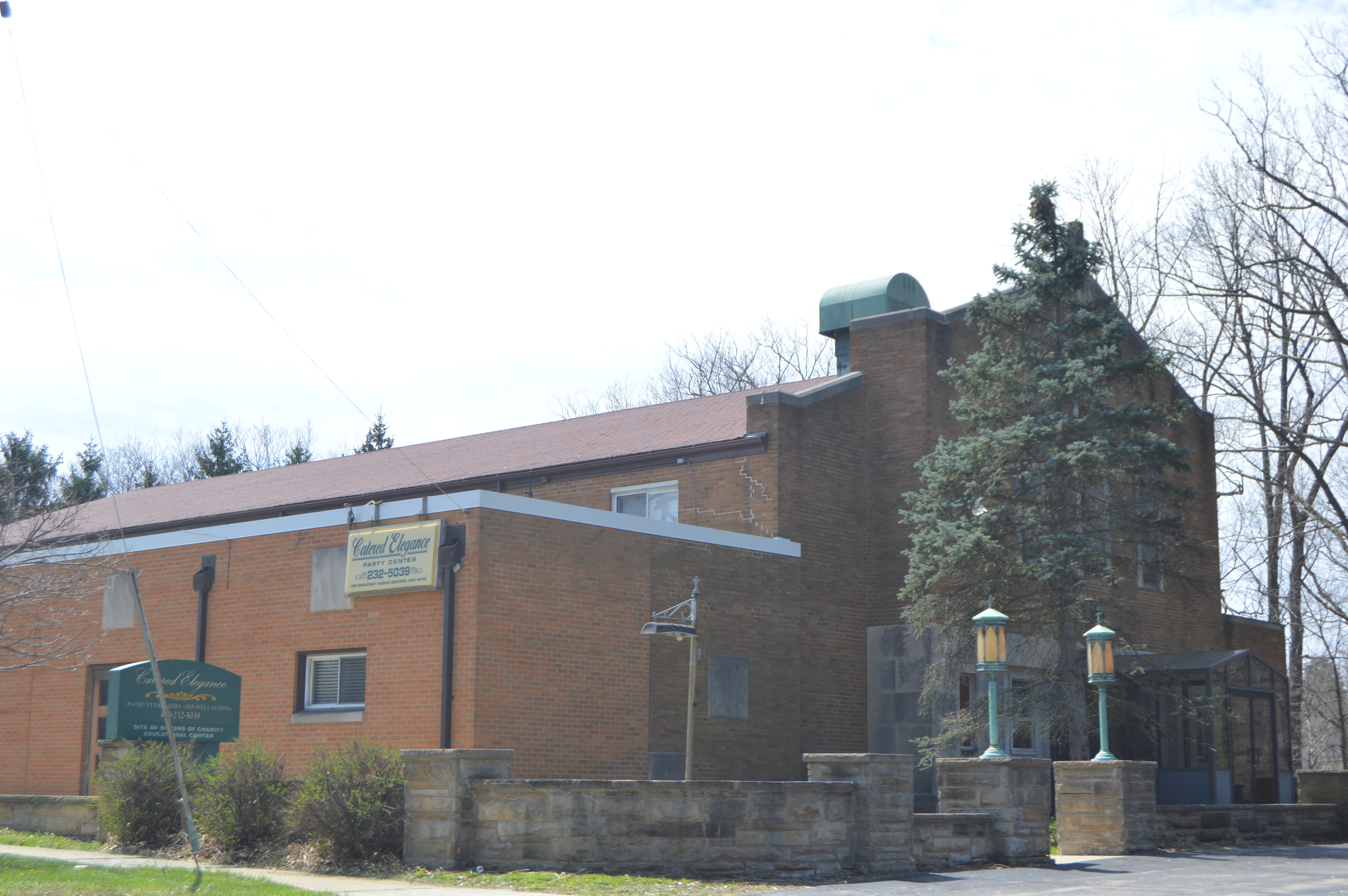
Part of the Villa San Bernardo complex at Bedford, Ohio

The Vincentian Sisters of Charity were an American religious congregation of Religious Sisters founded in Pittsburgh, Pennsylvania, in 1902 to serve the Slovak American immigrant population in Pennsylvania.

== History ==
Their foundation started with the request of the Rev. Adalbert Kazincy, pastor of St. Michael Parish in Braddock, Pennsylvania, made to the Sisters of Charity of St. Vincent de Paul in Slovakia for help with caring for the children of the large Slovak immigrant population then arriving to seek work in the steel mills of Western Pennsylvania.

In response to this request, a small band of pioneer Sisters emigrated to the United States from Szatmar, in the Kingdom of Hungary, under the leadership of Mother Emerentiana Handlovits, their appointed Superior. These five Sisters of Charity of St. Vincent de Paul, subsequently known as the Vincentian Sisters of Charity, were dedicated to serving God through teaching and ministering to the sick. Their primary mission was to work among the vast number of Slovak immigrants in the area.

They arrived in the United States in 1902 and the Sisters immediately began teaching in the parish school, living in a rented house provided by the parish. Within two years, the parishioners of St. Michael's built them a small convent. Young local girls interested in a religious life began to inquire about entering the new congregation. In response to this interest, a novitiate was established and the first American candidate was admitted on 2 January 1905.

In addition to teaching children in parochial schools, the Sisters began Vincentian High School (now Vincentian Academy) and began to serve the elderly, opening several nursing homes: the Vincentian Home, Villa de Marillac, Regency Hall Nursing Home and Adult Day Care and Marian Manor. These facilities were organized into the Vincentian Collaborative System, which began to offer a range of levels of care.

The membership and work of the congregation quickly grew from teaching children in the parochial schools of southwestern Pennsylvania and the founding of Vincentian Academy to establishing hospitals, long-term healthcare facilities, and a child development center. Eventually their ministries expanded throughout the United States, including work among the impoverished African Americans in Alabama, then in Canada and later Peru.

== Dissolution ==
In 2001 discussions were begun by the Vincentian Sisters with the Sisters of Charity of Nazareth, founded in Kentucky in 1812, regarding the possibility of their merger into the Nazareth congregation. When asked why did the two communities merge, Sister Teresa Novak, President of Vincentian Collaborative Services, said "As Vincentian Sisters, our numbers were decreasing and the Sisters wanted to insure that the charism and mission of St. Vincent and St. Louise begun here in Western Pennsylvania in 1902 would continue."

Western Province Vice-Provincial Brenda Gonzales, SCN, observed that this is one of the trends in religious life today. “It is out of necessity and a calling to be better stewards of our resources. We have finite resources and personnel. By joining together we focus on what is important – ministries and mission. By coming together we can do more.”

The members of both congregations approved the merger, and on 15 November 2008, 109 Vincentian Sisters of Charity transferred their religious vows, becoming Sisters of Charity of Nazareth. The Pittsburgh Sisters serve in the dioceses of Cleveland and Steubenville, Ohio; Madison, Wis.; Montgomery, Ala.; Venice, Fla.; St. Catharines, Ontario, Canada; and Greensburg and Pittsburgh, Pa.
