= Ray Ventrone =

American football player and coach (born 1982)

Raymond Ventrone
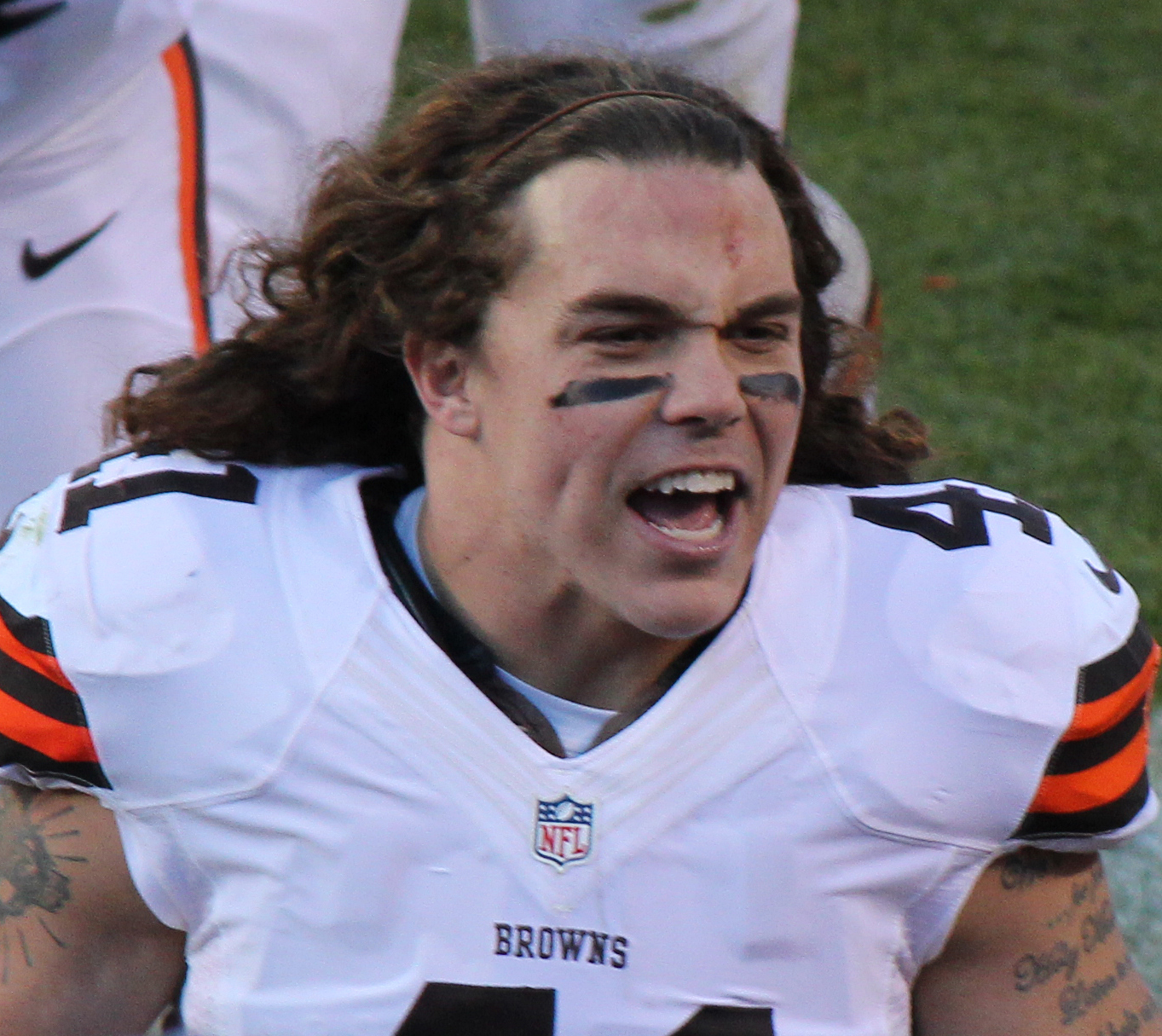
- Ventrone with the Cleveland Browns in 2012

Los Angeles Rams
- Title: Special teams coordinator

Personal information
- Born: October 21, 1982 (age 44); Pittsburgh, Pennsylvania, U.S.
- Listed height: 5 ft 10 in (1.78 m)
- Listed weight: 200 lb (91 kg)

Career information
- Position: Safety (No. 41, 23)
- High school: Chartiers Valley (Collier Township, Pennsylvania)
- College: Villanova
- NFL draft: 2005: undrafted

Career history

Playing
- New England Patriots (2005−2006)*; → Cologne Centurions (2006); New York Jets (2007)*; New England Patriots (2007−2008); Cleveland Browns (2009−2012); San Francisco 49ers (2013−2014)
- * Offseason or practice squad member only

Coaching
- New England Patriots (2015–2017) Assistant special teams coach; Indianapolis Colts (2018–2022) Special teams coordinator; Cleveland Browns (2023–2025) Assistant head coach & special teams coordinator; Los Angeles Rams (2026–present) Special teams coordinator

Awards and highlights
- As an assistant coach: Super Bowl champion (LI); As a player: First-team All-A-10 (2003)

Career NFL statistics
- Total tackles: 64
- Forced fumbles: 1
- Fumble recoveries: 2
- Stats at Pro Football Reference

Raymond "Bubba" Ventrone (/vɛnˈtroʊn/; born October 21, 1982) is an American professional football coach and former player who is the special teams coordinator for the Los Angeles Rams of the National Football League (NFL). He played in the NFL as a safety.

Ventrone played college football for the Villanova Wildcats and was signed by the New England Patriots as an undrafted free agent in 2005. He was also a member of the New York Jets, Cleveland Browns, and San Francisco 49ers. After his playing career, Ventrone joined the Patriots coaching staff as assistant coach for special teams in March 2015 and was announced as the special teams coach of the Colts on February 15, 2018.

== Early life ==
Ventrone received the nickname "Bubba" from his father as a child. As a seventh grader, Ventrone and two of his friends founded the Nathan S. Arenson Fund for Pancreatic Cancer Research, which supports research into pancreatic cancer at the University of Pittsburgh.

Ventrone attended Chartiers Valley High School in Bridgeville, Pennsylvania, where he played football and holds records in track and field. He was a three-time All-Conference player and a Second-team All-State as a senior.

Ventrone has a younger brother, Ross Ventrone, who in 2010 signed as an undrafted free agent with the Patriots. He last played for the Pittsburgh Steelers in 2016.

== College career ==
Ventrone began his college career at Villanova University in 2001. As a junior in 2003, Ventrone was selected to the All-Atlantic 10 Conference first-team. He finished his college career with 251 tackles, two sacks, and five forced fumbles. At Villanova, he was the hard-hitting safety who was often barred from making contact during practices to avoid injuring his teammates; with a few exceptions, including Leighton Zema.

== Professional career ==
Pre-draft measurables
Height	Weight
5 ft 9 5/8 in (1.77 m)	200 lb (91 kg)
Values from Pro Day

=== New England Patriots (first stint) ===
Although the Patriots considered picking Ventrone with the final pick of the 2005 NFL draft, they chose tight end Andy Stokes as Mr. Irrelevant; Ventrone then signed as an undrafted free agent. Ventrone was released at the end of training camp and re-signed to the practice squad. After spending the rest of the 2005 season on the practice squad, he was allocated to NFL Europa in the spring of 2006. There, Ventrone suffered an injury and was placed on the team's NFL Europe/Non-Football Injury list, sidelining him for the 2006 season.

=== New York Jets ===
After the Patriots released Ventrone on February 13, 2007, he signed with the New York Jets on February 21; then-Jets head coach Eric Mangini had been Ventrone's defensive coordinator with the Patriots in 2005. After the Jets released Ventrone in their final cutdown before the 2007 season, they signed him to their practice squad, but released him on September 12.

=== New England Patriots (second stint) ===
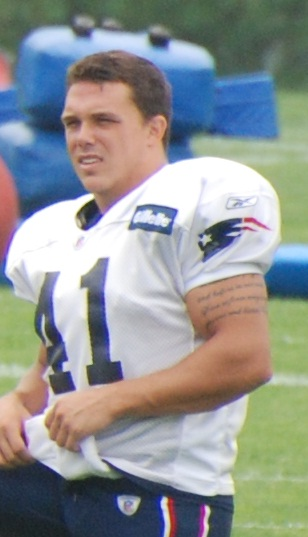
Ventrone in 2009 training camp with the New England Patriots.

The Patriots signed Ventrone to their practice squad on September 18, 2007, and then promoted to the team's 53-man roster on November 3. Upon the activation of Eddie Jackson and Chad Jackson from the PUP list, the Patriots released Ventrone on November 7, 2007, and re-signed him to their practice squad two days later. He was again promoted to the active roster in December, and remained on the active roster for the balance of the season, including Super Bowl XLII, in which he recorded his first NFL tackle.

During the 2008 offseason, Ventrone began practicing as a wide receiver, a position he had not played in games since he was a sophomore at Chartiers Valley High School; he had, however, previously lined up at wide receiver on scout teams in Patriots practices. In the Patriots' third 2008 preseason game, Ventrone led all receivers with four receptions, while still playing on special teams and defense. Ventrone would go on to play in 15 games during the 2008 season, almost exclusively on special teams, recording six special teams tackles.

During a July 31, 2009, press conference, Patriots head coach Bill Belichick spoke of Ventrone:

Ray is fast and he's tough. No one works harder than Ray. He's a smart football player. He puts his heart and soul into it every time he steps onto the field. It doesn't matter if it's regular season or postseason game or a walkthrough practice. He has that same intensity and same level of competitiveness on every single play. You've got to love that about Ray. He's a tough kid. He's got good speed. He's got good quickness. He's strong for his size. He's not a real tall guy, but he's well put together. He's got good power and he plays very aggressively. That stuff will carry a long way.

Despite those comments, however, the Patriots released Ventrone during their final cutdowns on September 5, 2009.

=== Cleveland Browns ===
Ventrone signed with the Cleveland Browns on September 16, 2009. He was re-signed to a three-year, $2.2 million deal on March 6, 2010. Ventrone was selected as a Pro Bowl Alternate as a Special Teamer in 2010 where he led the #1 ranked special teams unit in the NFL. He was Special Teams Captain in 2011 and 2012.

=== San Francisco 49ers ===
Ventrone signed with the San Francisco 49ers on June 3, 2013, and served as a special teams captain for the 2013 and 2014 seasons; he was voted "Special Teams Player of the Year" by his teammates and coaches.

== Coaching career ==
=== New England Patriots ===
On March 3, 2015, the New England Patriots announced that they had hired Ray Ventrone as a special teams assistant coach. He fills the vacancy left after Scott O'Brien retired as Patriots' special teams coach, and assistant Joe Judge was named as O'Brien's replacement. His hire ended the Patriots' status as the only NFL team without a former player on its coaching staff. On February 5, 2017, Ventrone was part of the Patriots coaching staff that won Super Bowl LI. In the game, the Patriots defeated the Atlanta Falcons by a score of 34–28 in overtime.

=== Indianapolis Colts ===
On February 15, 2018, Ventrone was hired as the special teams coach of the Indianapolis Colts.

=== Cleveland Browns ===
On February 24, 2023, the Cleveland Browns officially announced Ventrone as their new assistant head coach and special teams coordinator.

=== Los Angeles Rams ===
On February 2, 2026, it was announced that Ventrone had joined the Los Angeles Rams as the team's special teams coordinator.
