= Donna Feigley Barbisch =

U.S. Army major general

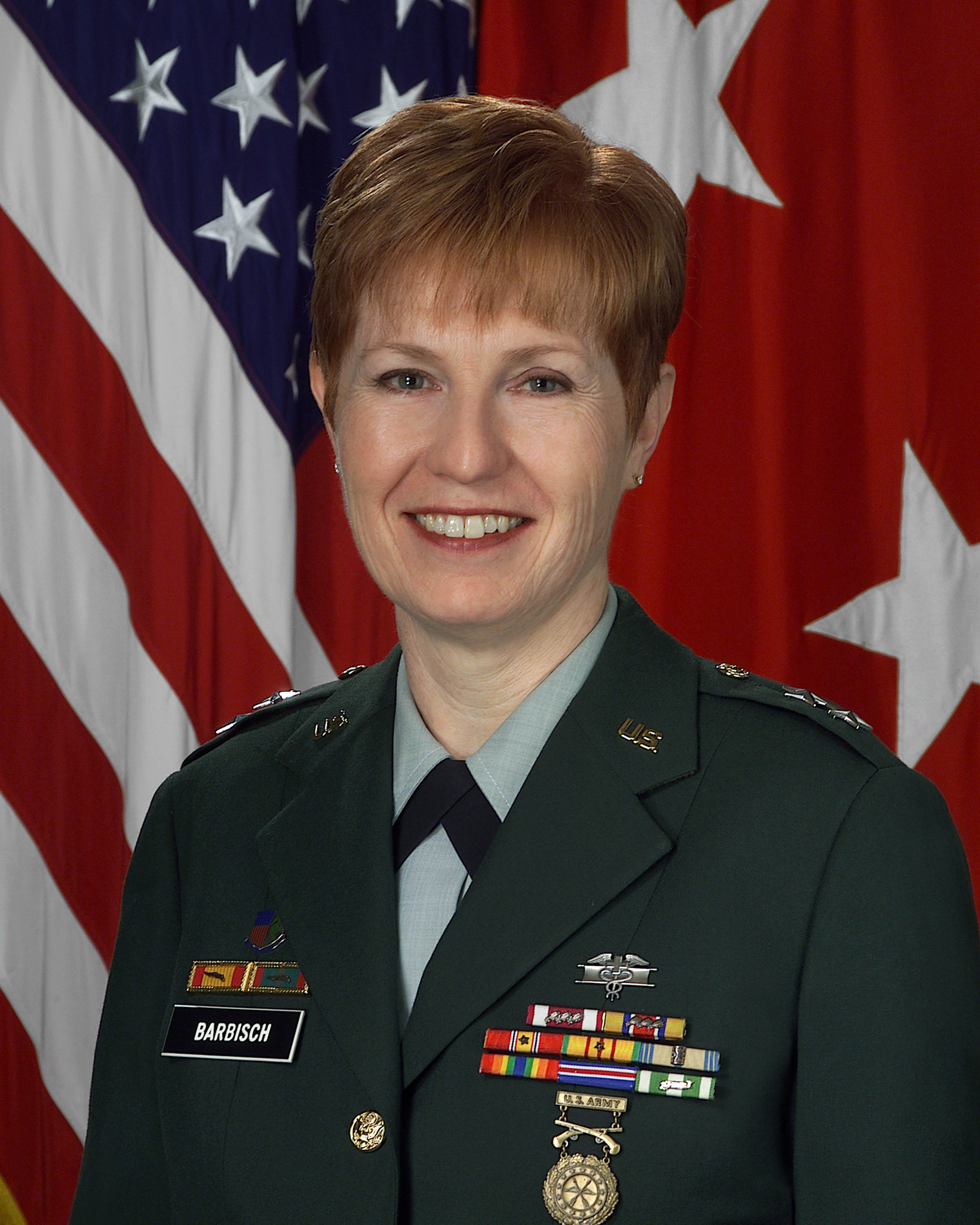
- Barbisch as a major general, circa 2002
- Born: July 14, 1947 (age 79); Dormont, Pennsylvania
- Education: California University of Pennsylvania; University of North Carolina School of Medicine; Medical University of South Carolina
- Military career
- Allegiance: United States
- Branch: United States Army
- Service years: 1967–2005
- Rank: Major General
- Unit: United States Army Nurse Corps
- Commands: 350th Mobile Army Surgical Hospital
- Conflicts: Vietnam War
- Awards: Defense Superior Service Medal; Meritorious Service Medal (4)
- Other work: Disaster preparedness consultant

Donna Feigley Barbisch (born July 14, 1947) is a retired United States Army officer and local elected official in the District of Columbia. A veteran of the Vietnam War, she attained the rank of major general. Barbisch specialized in anti-terrorism preparedness in both her military and civilian careers. As a consultant, she trained both military and civilian governments in countering terrorism.

== Early life and start of career ==
Barbisch was born in Pittsburgh, Pennsylvania on July 14, 1947, a daughter of David A. Feigley and Jean (Bower) Feigley. She graduated from Chartiers Valley High School in 1965 and attended the Columbia Hospital School of Nursing in Wilkinsburg.

In 1967, Barbisch enlisted in the United States Army and enrolled in the Army Student Nurse program. Two years later, she was assigned to the 91st Evacuation Hospital at Chu Lai Base Area in South Vietnam, where she served for a year.

== Education ==
Barbisch completed a bachelor's degree in anesthesia and education from California University of Pennsylvania. She later obtained a master's degree in public health from the UNC Chapel Hill. In addition, she holds a doctorate in health administration and leadership from the Medical University of South Carolina. Her military education includes the Army Medical Department's Command and General Staff Officer Course and the United States Army War College.

== Continued service ==
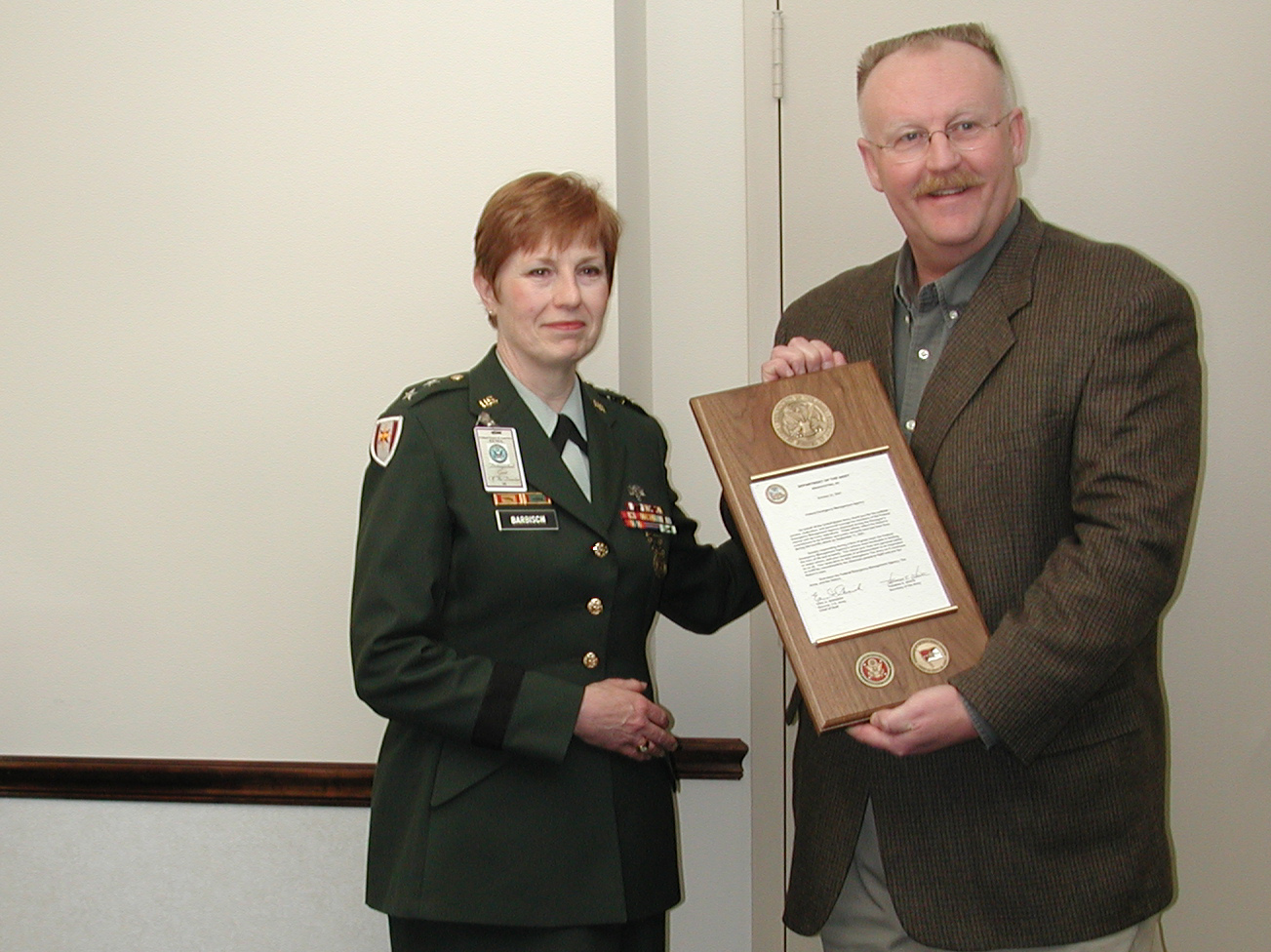
Barbish presents plaque to FEMA Director Joe Allbaugh to commemorate FEMA's assistance with the Pentagon's post-September 11, 2001 terrorist attack recovery.

After her Vietnam service, Barbisch continued her military career on active duty and as a member of the United States Army Reserve. She commanded 350th Mobile Army Surgical Hospital in Greenville, North Carolina and was Director of Reserve Component Integration Studies at the Army War College's Department of Command, Leadership, and Management. Barbisch later served as the 3rd Medical Command's deputy commander for clinical support, and she was promoted to brigadier general in 1998.

Barbisch wrote her 1999 doctoral dissertation on chemical, biological and nuclear attacks which centered on four domestic terrorism events. When the terrorist attacks of September 11, 2001 took place she was in Ankara, Turkey for her civilian employment, briefing State Department personnel on government response in following a terrorist attack.

In 2002, Barbisch was promoted to major general. Among her assignments at this rank were military assistant to the Assistant Secretary of the Army (Manpower and Reserve Affairs). She retired in 2005, and her awards include the Defense Superior Service Medal, Meritorious Service Medal, Army Reserve Components Achievement Medal, National Defense Service Medal, Vietnam Service Medal, Armed Forces Reserve Medal, Army Service Ribbon, Army Reserve Components Overseas Training Ribbon, Republic of Vietnam Gallantry Cross with Palm, Republic of Vietnam Civil Actions Unit Citation, Vietnam Campaign Medal, and Expert Field Medical Badge.

== Later career ==
After retiring, Barbisch served as a member of the board of directors for the Army Women's Foundation. She was also president of Global Deterrence Alternatives, a consulting business that provided advice and guidance on deterring terrorism and building capacity in order to respond to disasters. Barbisch was a distinguished fellow and affiliate faculty member at George Mason University's Center for Critical Infrastructure. She also served on the editorial advisory board of the American Medical Association's journal Disaster Medicine and Public Health Preparedness.

In 2020, Barbisch was elected to the District of Columbia's Advisory Neighborhood Commission from Ward 2. Her District, Number 2A04 (Foggy Bottom and the West End), includes the Watergate complex, Lincoln Memorial, and Potomac River. She began her term of office on January 2, 2021.

== Personal ==
Barbisch is the mother of two daughters, Rebecca and Patricia, both of whom pursued careers as engineers.
