= Madison Campbell (businesswoman) =

American businesswoman (born 1995)

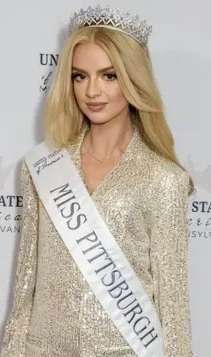
- Campbell in 2023
- Born: Madison Pulford Campbell; October 26, 1995 (age 30); Bridgeville, Pennsylvania, U.S.
- Education: Lincoln Park Performing Arts Charter School; Hampshire College
- Occupation: Businesswoman
- Years active: 2018–present

Madison Pulford Campbell (born October 26, 1995) is an American model and businesswoman who has served as the founder and chief executive officer (CEO) of Leda Health since 2019.

== Early life and education ==
Madison Campbell was born in Bridgeville, Pennsylvania, in 1995. She grew up in a conservative Catholic family in a suburb of Pittsburgh.

Campbell's initial foray into the performing arts was in musical theater, which she pursued at Lincoln Park Performing Arts Charter School. However, a lisp, considered a hindrance for auditions, prompted her to switch to dance. This pursuit was cut short due to a diagnosis of thoracic outlet syndrome, a nerve disorder that impeded her ability to perform. Following her diagnosis, Campbell decided to major in public health and epidemiology at Hampshire College, aspiring to earn a Ph.D. in epidemiology and work at NASA. During her last semester, she was in an abusive relationship, felt her career plans derailed by NASA budget cuts, and ended up dropping out.

While at Hampshire College, Campbell established a Young Americans for Liberty chapter. She interned at the Charles Koch Institute and Senator Rand Paul's PAC.

== Career ==
Prior to co-founding Leda, Campbell founded Iyanu in 2018, a company designed to address the equity gap in Nigeria by connecting individuals to jobs in the United States.

In 2019, Campbell founded MeToo Kits, later rebranded as Leda Health after the mythic Greek queen, Leda. Her decision to start Leda Health was driven by her own experience as a survivor of sexual assault, stating she sought to help others face challenges in collecting evidence and seeking justice. The company developed an "early evidence kit" in close collaboration with medical and law-enforcement personnel, using blockchain to encrypt data. This data, attached to a specific user account, allows sexual assault survivors to collect evidence without the need to visit a hospital or police station. The kits are available in Florida. Three years afterward, Leda Health expanded its services to include Plan B, STI testing, and raised $7 million in funding. In 2022, Leda Health was included in Fortune's Change the World list.

In 2023, Campbell was crowned Miss Pittsburgh. A year later, in 2024, she served as an alternate delegate for Pennsylvania at the Republican National Convention.

== Personal life ==
Campbell dated Martin Shkreli between February and August 2023. Campbell says the two bonded over being "healthcare pariahs" but chose to keep her relationship with him private due to his reputation.

== Awards and recognition ==
- Forbes' 30 Under 30
- CES Award
- Maverick's 40u40
