= Harold Stephens (author) =

American author (1926–2021)

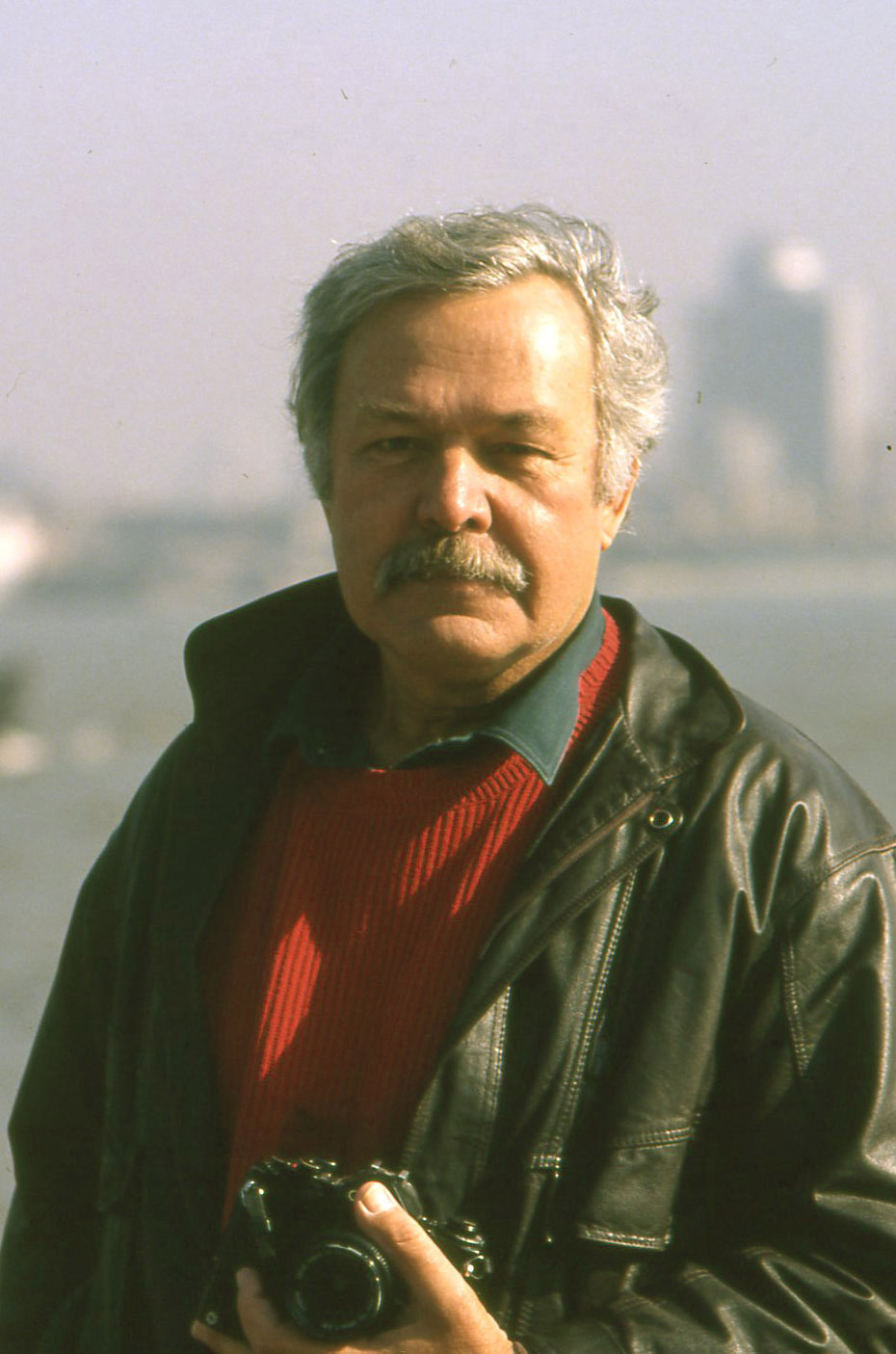
- Stephens in Shanghai, 2008
- Born: December 3, 1926; Bridgeville, Pennsylvania, U.S.
- Died: January 2021 (aged 94)
- Occupation: Author
- Writing career
- Period: 1957-2021
- Genres: Travel Writer, Novelist

Harold "Steve" Stephens (December 3, 1926 – January 2021) was an American author known for his explorations of World War II China and his world travels and adventures. Beginning his career as a writer while enlisted as an American Marine in China, he wrote as a travel correspondent for various publications, including The Washington Post and Bangkok Post, and has written many books about travel and history.

== Biography ==
Harold Stephens was born in Bridgeville, Pennsylvania, and raised on a nearby farm. When the farmhouse burned down, he went to work in the coal mines and later in the steel mills. A month before his seventeenth birthday, he lied about his age to enlist in the United States Marine Corps. Four months later, he fought in the Battle of Okinawa. When the war ended in 1945, he went to China as a China Marine. He landed in Qingdao, attended the Chinese language school, and became an interpreter. He remained in China until the communist revolution in 1949.

Back home again and not wanting to return to the steel mills, Stephens re-enlisted in the Marine Corps. He was sent to Paris as a Marine Security Guard and became an aide to the American ambassador Jefferson Caffery. Stephens met and married an American who was working in Paris. Realizing the need for an education, they returned to America. He took his discharge, and with an appointment from Ambassador Caffery, entered the Foreign Service School, Georgetown University. One of his classmates was Jackie Kennedy.

Graduating from Georgetown in 1955, Stephens studied law but ultimately dropped out to work with the National Security Agency. He soon decided that working for the government was far worse than the steel mills of Pennsylvania. At the same time, he and his wife divorced.

Stephens' career as a writer began as a marine in China, when he started writing short stories and skits. While working for the government in Washington, he wrote travel articles for the Washington Post. After his divorce, he decided to write full-time. He resigned from the National Security Agency and embarked on a life of travel and adventure. He moved to Tahiti to live but left when the French turned the islands into a nuclear testing ground, and moved to Asia. He joined a camel caravan in Kabul, Afghanistan, crossing the country on a camel.

Stephens eventually returned to Southeast Asia, where he joined the staff of the Bangkok Post and also became a travel correspondent for Royal Orchid Holidays at Thai Airways.

Stephens married again to Michelle, an Asian woman at the Bangkok Post. They had three sons.

== Bibliography ==
- Discover the Orient With Harold Stephens (1966 Asia Pacific Press)
- Who Needs a Road? (1967, 1999) (ISBN 0964252155)
- Malaysia (1971 ISBN 962-421-102-7)
- Wander With the Wind (1972)
- Turn South at the Equator (1973)
- Destination Singapore (1974)
- Go Motoring in Southeast Asia (1975)
- Singapore (1981 ISBN 962-7031-05-4)
- Singapore After Dark (1981 ISBN 962-7031-09-7 )
- New Worlds to Conquer (1982)
- Asian Portraits (1988)
- Asian Adventure (1989 ISBN 9971-73-168-1)
- Asia's First: Scandinavian Airlines (1994)
- At Home in Asia (1995) (ISBN 978-0-9642521-1-0)
- Three Decades of Asian Travel and Adventure (1996) (ISBN 974-202-041-8)
- The Last Voyage – The Story of Schooner Third Sea (1997) (ISBN 0-9642521-3-9)
- The Tower and the River (1998, novel) (ISBN 0-9642521-4-7)
- Return to Adventure Southeast Asia (2000) (ISBN 978-0-9642521-6-5)
- "The Chao Phraya – River of Kings" (2000) (ISBN 974-410-150-4)
- Take China – The Last of the China Marines (2002) (ISBN 0-9642521-8-X)
- The Strange Disappearance of Jim Thompson (2003) (ISBN 0-9642521-7-1)
- Tales From the Pacific Rim (2007, short stories) (ISBN 0-9786951-0-0)
- For the Love of Siam (2008, biographical novel) (ISBN 0-9786951-1-9)
- The Education of a Travel Writer (2009, autobiography) (ISBN 0-9786951-2-7)
