= Constitution High School =

Coordinates: 39.95041°N 75.15228°W

Location
- 18 S. 7th and Market streets Philadelphia, Pennsylvania 19106; United States

Information
- Type: Public high school
- Motto: "United We Stand, Divided We Fall"
- Established: 2006
- School district: The School District of Philadelphia
- Principal: Brianna Dunn-Robb
- Staff: 14 (FTE)
- Grades: 9–12
- Enrollment: 391 (2017–18)
- Student to teacher ratio: 27.93
- Color: Red White Blue
- Mascot: Constitution General
- Newspaper: 1787 News
- Website: https://constitutionhs.philasd.org

Constitution High School (nickname Con High) is a college preparatory high school located in Center City Philadelphia, Pennsylvania. It is the first history based high school in Pennsylvania. It was founded September 2006 by Dr. Thomas Davidson. About 290 attend grades 9 through 12. It is located in close proximity to Independence Mall in Philadelphia. Constitution High School has a strong relationship with the National Constitution Center, as well as partnerships with the Gilder Lehrman Institute of American History and Philadelphia law firm, Ballard Spahr LLP.

== History ==
Constitution High School was founded in 2006 by Dr. Thomas Davidson, as a partnership between the Philadelphia School District, the National Constitution Center, Ballard Spahr LLP, and the Gilder Lehrman Institute of American History. Constitution High School is a college preparatory, citywide admission school located in the heart of Philadelphia's Historic District, and is the only law, democracy, and history themed high school in the Philadelphia School District and the state of Pennsylvania. Constitution has a classroom that is designed as a courtroom.

In 2023, former Constitution basketball star Jacob Beccles became the first player from the Public League to receive admission to an Ivy League University in 40 years, after committing to play basketball at Cornell University.
