= Bridgeville, Pennsylvania =

Borough in Pennsylvania, US

- Borough
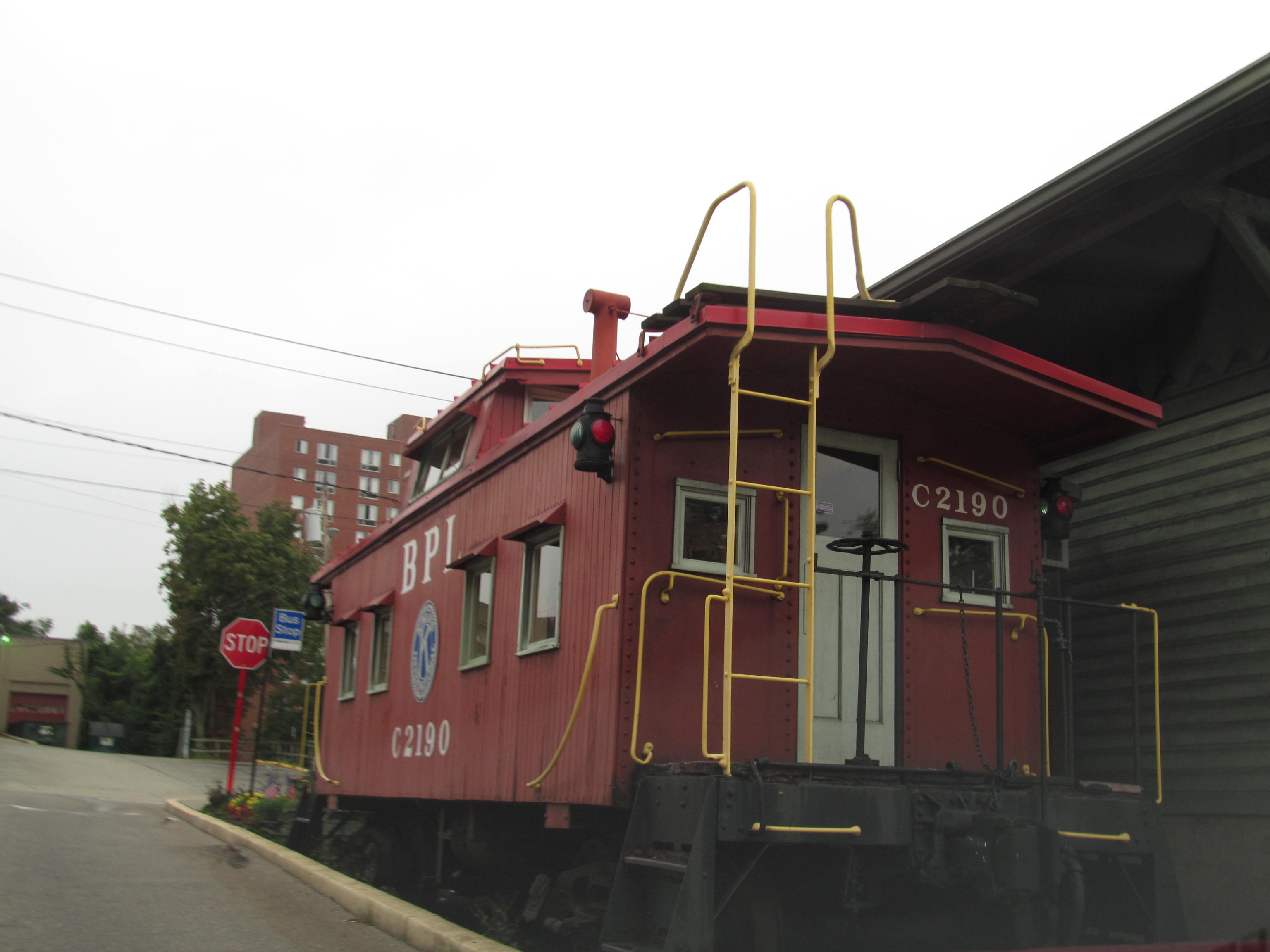
- Etymology: Bridge over Chartiers Creek
- Location in Allegheny County and the U.S. state of Pennsylvania.
- Coordinates: 40°21′25″N 80°06′31″W
- Country: United States
- State: Pennsylvania
- County: Allegheny
- Settled: c. 1830
- Incorporated: July 27, 1901

Government
  - Mayor: Betty Copeland (D)

Area
  - Total: 1.10 sq mi (2.84 km^{2})
  - Land: 1.10 sq mi (2.84 km^{2})
  - Water: 0 sq mi (0.00 km^{2})
- Elevation: 820 ft (250 m)

Population (2020)
  - Total: 4,804
  - Density: 4,386.6/sq mi (1,693.68/km^{2})
- Time zone: UTC-5 (EST)
  - Summer (DST): UTC-4 (EDT)
- ZIP code: 15017
- Area code: 412
- FIPS code: 42-08624
- School district: Chartiers Valley
- Website: www.bridgevilleboro.com

Bridgeville is a borough in Allegheny County, Pennsylvania, United States. The population was 4,804 at the 2020 census. It is a residential suburb of the Pittsburgh metropolitan area.

== History ==
The village that eventually became Bridgeville acquired its name because of the first bridge built at the crossing of Chartiers Creek at the south end of what is now Washington Avenue.

The area was originally named St. Clair Township in 1763, and the southern part was split off as Upper St. Clair Township in 1806. For nearly 100 years, Bridgeville was a village within Upper St. Clair Township, known for its one bridge over Chartiers Creek where people frequently met to trade goods. An old saying, "Meet me at the bridge," provided an obvious name for the village that began to develop north of the bridge around 1830.

Mining operations began in the 1880s, prompting growth. One impressive institution for the time was the Norwood Hotel. Of Victorian architecture, it included about forty eight rooms for occupants, a dining room, a bar, and a ball room. Each room had a fireplace, and the entire hotel was provided with running water. A two inch pipeline led from Brandy Spring, high on the hill above Chartiers Creek at the end of Elizabeth Street, to the hotel. The spring was touted as a mineral spring, with the associated therapeutic properties claimed for its water. The Norwood’s grounds were extensive. There was a covered outdoor bowling alley, well groomed lawns, an outdoor pavilion, benches and lawn swings, and a large stable where visitors could rent horses and buggies to tour the surrounding countryside.

Even more significant to the development of Bridgeville was the advent of commercial coal mining. The Pittsburgh Coal Seam was perhaps the most valuable mineral resource in North America in the late 1800s. Ranging from forty inches to six feet thick it was located at an elevation that produced outcroppings on all the hillsides in this area.

Bridgeville was officially incorporated as a borough on July 27, 1901, from Upper St. Clair Township.

A mass shooting took place on August 4, 2009, in an LA Fitness health club near Bridgeville in Collier Township. The attack resulted in four deaths, including that of the perpetrator, who took his own life. Nine other people were injured.

== Geography ==
Bridgeville is located along Chartiers Creek, about 8 miles (13 km) southwest of downtown Pittsburgh at 40°21′25″N 80°6′31″W.

According to the United States Census Bureau, the borough has a total area of 1.1 square miles (2.8 km^{2}), all land. Its average elevation is 1,250 ft (381 m) above sea level.

McLaughlin Run, a tributary to Chartiers Creek, flows through Bridgeville.

=== Surrounding communities ===
Bridgeville has three borders with the townships of Collier to the north and northwest, South Fayette to the west and southwest, and Upper St. Clair to the south, southeast and east.

== Demographics ==
Historical population
Census	Pop.	Note	%±
1880	147		—
1910	1,983		—
1920	3,092		55.9%
1930	3,939		27.4%
1940	4,459		13.2%
1950	5,650		26.7%
1960	7,112		25.9%
1970	6,717		−5.6%
1980	6,154		−8.4%
1990	5,445		−11.5%
2000	5,341		−1.9%
2010	5,148		−3.6%
2020	4,804		−6.7%

=== 2020 census ===
As of the 2020 census, Bridgeville had a population of 4,804. The median age was 44.3 years. 16.1% of residents were under the age of 18 and 21.6% of residents were 65 years of age or older. For every 100 females there were 93.9 males, and for every 100 females age 18 and over there were 91.7 males age 18 and over.

100.0% of residents lived in urban areas, while 0.0% lived in rural areas.

There were 2,386 households in Bridgeville, of which 19.4% had children under the age of 18 living in them. Of all households, 34.3% were married-couple households, 23.3% were households with a male householder and no spouse or partner present, and 34.5% were households with a female householder and no spouse or partner present. About 43.1% of all households were made up of individuals and 19.4% had someone living alone who was 65 years of age or older.

There were 2,587 housing units, of which 7.8% were vacant. The homeowner vacancy rate was 2.4% and the rental vacancy rate was 6.7%.

Racial composition as of the 2020 census
Race	Number	Percent
White	4,254	88.6%
Black or African American	201	4.2%
American Indian and Alaska Native	2	0.0%
Asian	60	1.2%
Native Hawaiian and Other Pacific Islander	0	0.0%
Some other race	47	1.0%
Two or more races	240	5.0%
Hispanic or Latino (of any race)	110	2.3%

=== 2000 census ===
As of the 2000 census, there were 5,341 people, 2,539 households, and 1,444 families residing in the borough. The population density was 4,938.5 people per square mile (1,906.8 people/km^{2}). There were 2,656 housing units at an average density of 2,455.9 per square mile (948.2/km^{2}). The racial makeup of the borough was 94.05% White, 4.42% African American, 0.09% Native American, 0.37% Asian, 0.34% from other races, and 0.73% from two or more races. Hispanic or Latino of any race were 0.77% of the population.

There were 2,539 households, out of which 20.8% had children under the age of 18 living with them, 43.6% were married couples living together, 10.1% had a female householder with no husband present, and 43.1% were non-families. 39.5% of all households were made up of individuals, and 21.4% had someone living alone who was 65 years of age or older. The average household size was 2.09 and the average family size was 2.81.

In the borough the population was spread out, with 18.0% under the age of 18, 5.6% from 18 to 24, 28.4% from 25 to 44, 22.2% from 45 to 64, and 25.8% who were 65 years of age or older. The median age was 44 years. For every 100 females, there were 86.9 males. For every 100 females age 18 and over, there were 82.3 males.

The median income for a household in the borough was $34,873, and the median income for a family was $46,500. Males had a median income of $35,461 versus $25,527 for females. The per capita income for the borough was $19,500. About 5.6% of families and 7.8% of the population were below the poverty line, including 6.6% of those under age 18 and 12.0% of those age 65 or over.

== Government and politics ==
The Bridgeville borough government leadership consists of the mayor, council members, and other officials who are either elected or appointed to their posts.

Presidential Elections Results
Year	Republican	Democratic	Third Parties
2024	Lost	WON	Lost
2020	48% 1,374	50% 1,447	1% 37
2016	48% 1,181	47% 1,155	5% 127
2012	50% 1,149	49% 1,137	1% 24

== Education ==
Bridgeville is served by the Chartiers Valley School District. The public school serves students from Bridgeville, Collier, Scott Township, and Heidelberg.

== Notable people ==
- Madison Campbell, CEO and founder of Leda Health
- Paul Danilo, member of the Soccer Hall of Fame
- Nicholas DiOrio, member of the Soccer Hall of Fame
- C.J. Henderson, author
- Eric Kush, NFL player
- T. J. McConnell, NBA player
- Ron Sams, NFL player
- Harold Stephens, writer and novelist
- Justin Watson, NFL player

== See also ==
- Universal Stainless
