= Chartiers Valley School District =

School district in Pennsylvania, US

Chartiers Valley School
- Map of Allegheny County, Pennsylvania School Districts with Chartiers Valley School District in orange in southwest Allegheny County.

Address
- 2030 Swallow Hill Road Pittsburgh, Pennsylvania, 15220; United States

District information
- Type: Public school district
- Motto: Inspiring Excellence
- Established: 1956
- Schools: 4

Students and staff
- District mascot: Colts
- Colors: Red and Blue

Other information
- Website: www.cvsd.net

Chartiers Valley School District is a suburban borough school district that serves an area southwest of Pittsburgh, including the Boroughs of Bridgeville, Heidelberg, Collier Township and Scott Township in Allegheny County, Pennsylvania, United States. The district was formed in 1956. Chartiers Valley School District encompasses approximately 18 square miles. According to 2000 federal census data, it serves a resident population of 29,119. In 2009, the district residents' per capita income was $23,365, while the median family income was $51,647.

The district operates one high school, one middle school, one intermediate school and one primary school.

The school district is named after Pierre Chartiers (1690—1759) who established a trading post in the area in 1743.

== Schools ==
Chartiers Valley School District operates four schools. They are:

- Chartiers Valley Primary School – serving students in kindergarten through 2nd grade.
- Chartiers Valley Intermediate School – serving students in grades 3 through 5.
- Chartiers Valley Middle School – serving students in grades 6 through 8.
- Chartiers Valley High School – Serving students in grades 9 through 12.
