= Ross Ventrone =

American football player (born 1986)

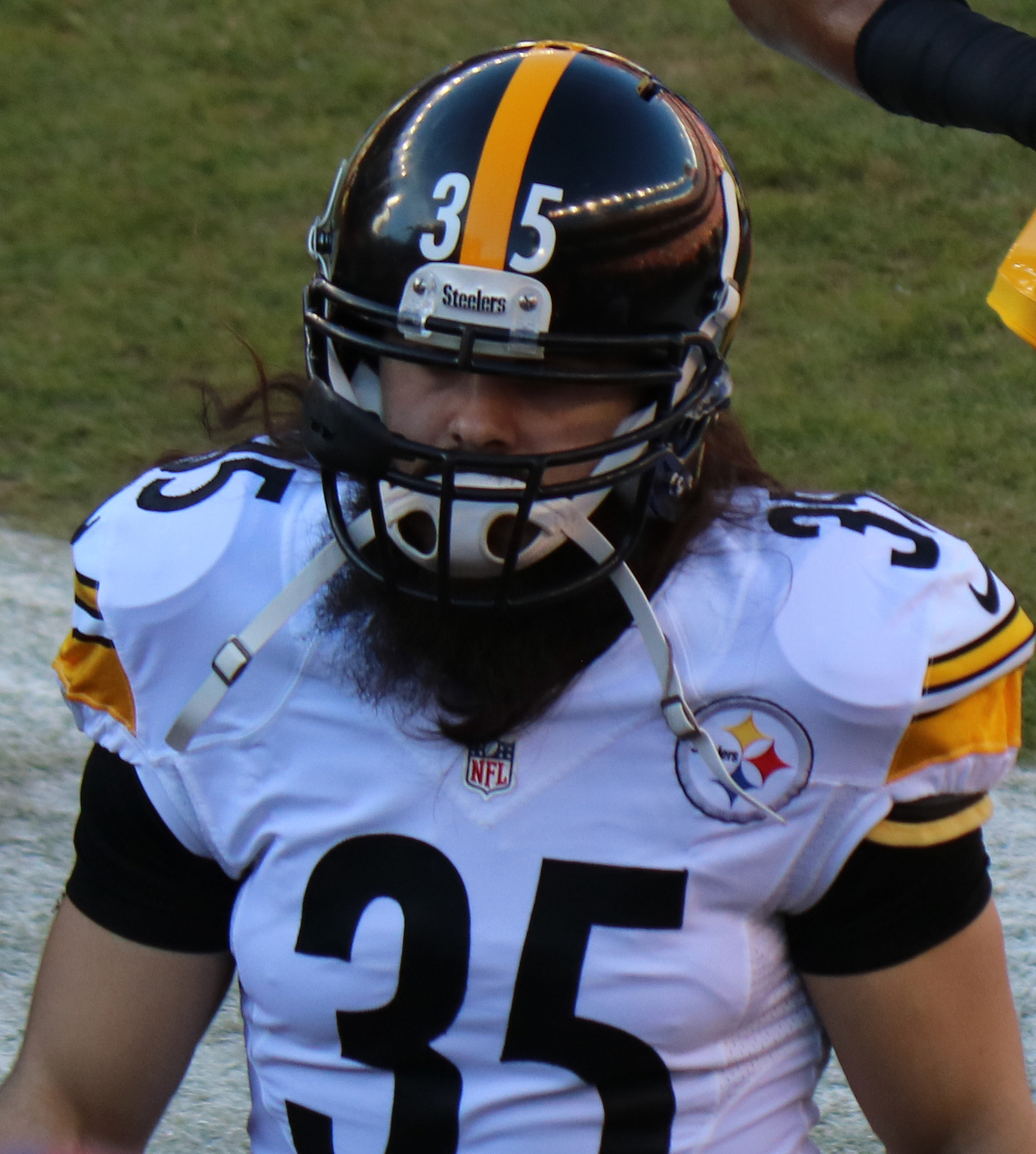
- Ventrone with the Pittsburgh Steelers in 2015

No. 35
- Position: Safety

Personal information
- Born: September 27, 1986 (age 40); Pittsburgh, Pennsylvania, U.S.
- Listed height: 5 ft 8 in (1.73 m)
- Listed weight: 198 lb (90 kg)

Career information
- High school: Chartiers Valley (Collier Township, Pennsylvania)
- College: Villanova
- NFL draft: 2010: undrafted

Career history
- New England Patriots (2010–2011); Pittsburgh Steelers (2013–2015); New England Patriots (2015)*; Pittsburgh Steelers (2015)
- * Offseason or practice squad member only

Career NFL statistics
- Total tackles: 12
- Stats at Pro Football Reference

Ross Ventrone (born September 27, 1986) is an American former professional football player who was a safety in the National Football League (NFL). He was signed by the New England Patriots as an undrafted free agent in 2010. He also played for the Pittsburgh Steelers.

Ventrone played college football for the Villanova Wildcats. He is the younger brother of current Los Angeles Rams special teams coordinator Ray Ventrone.

== Early life ==
Ventrone attended Sts. Simon and Jude Catholic School, and Chartiers Valley High School in Pittsburgh, Pennsylvania, where he did not play football until his senior year.

== College career ==
After graduating from high school, Ventrone began his college career as a walk-on at the University of Pittsburgh. He was redshirted in 2005 before working on Pittsburgh's scout team in 2006.

In 2007, Ventrone transferred to Villanova University, his brother Ray's alma mater, where he earned a football scholarship. He played in all 11 games in 2007, finishing third on the team with 64 tackles while also recording five pass break-ups and one interception. As a junior in 2008, Ventrone led the team with four interceptions, along with 61 tackles and a fumble recovery in 13 games played.

Ventrone was part of the Wildcats' NCAA Division I FCS Championship in 2009. He recorded 73 tackles including 53 solo stops, as well as 6.5 tackles for loss and three sacks.

== Professional career ==
Pre-draft measurables
Height	Weight	40-yard dash	10-yard split	20-yard split	20-yard shuttle	Three-cone drill	Vertical jump	Broad jump	Bench press
5 ft 8 1/8 in (1.73 m)	198 lb (90 kg)	4.48 s	1.55 s	2.59 s	4.27 s	6.78 s	35.5 in (0.90 m)	9 ft 9 in (2.97 m)	23 reps
All values from Pro Day

=== New England Patriots ===
After going undrafted in the 2010 NFL draft, Ventrone was signed by the New England Patriots on April 29, 2010. He played in the team's preseason opener against the New Orleans Saints before being waived on August 15. He was re-signed on August 23, and played in the team's final two preseason games before being waived during final cuts on September 4. He was signed to the Patriots' practice squad on October 19, 2010. He was re-signed to a future contract for the 2011 season on January 18, 2011.

Ventrone was signed, promoted, or released 21 times by the Patriots during the 2011 season, including eight transactions in November 2011. He played in eight games, in Week 3 against the Buffalo Bills, in Weeks 6 and 8 against the Dallas Cowboys and Pittsburgh Steelers, Week 11 against Kansas City Chiefs and in both games against the New York Jets. He has primarily played special teams, but did play on defense in the Patriots' Week 10 game against the Jets and also week 11 against the Chiefs.

Ventrone was released by the Patriots on August 26, 2012. The Patriots signed, promoted, or released him 29 times; an ESPN article compared Ventrone to a "human yo-yo."

=== Pittsburgh Steelers ===
On January 2, 2013, Ventrone signed with the Pittsburgh Steelers. He was released on August 31, 2013. The Steelers signed Ventrone to their practice squad on December 13, 2013.

After starting the 2014 season on the Steelers' practice squad, Ventrone was promoted to the 53-man roster on October 11, 2014. He played in nine games and was credited with seven tackles.

Ventrone was waived by the Steelers on October 13, 2015, after the Steelers activated wide receiver Martavis Bryant, following his 4-game suspension.

=== New England Patriots (second stint) ===
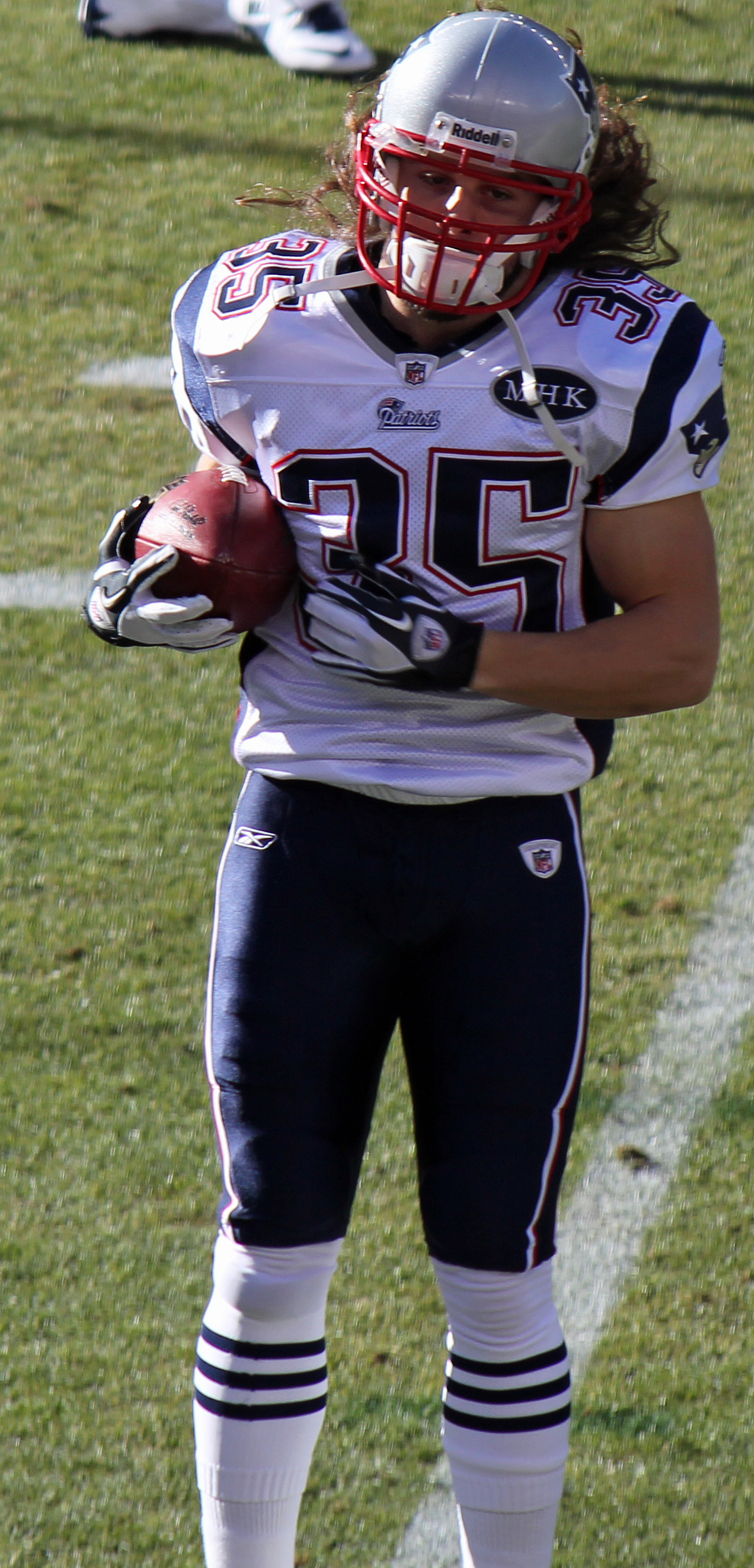
With the Patriots in 2011

Ventrone was signed to the Patriots practice squad on October 28, 2015, and released from the practice squad on November 18, 2015. These mark the 30th and 31st transactions Ross has had with the team.

=== Pittsburgh Steelers (second stint) ===
Ventrone was signed to the Steelers' practice squad on December 29, 2015 and then to the active roster on January 1, 2016, just in time for the team's regular season finale against the Cleveland Browns on January 3.

On August 14, 2016, the Steelers placed Ventrone on injured reserve after suffering a hamstring injury against the Detroit Lions. Two days later, he was released with an injury settlement.
