= Lincoln Park Performing Arts Charter School =

Coordinates: 40.6358°N 80.4500°W

Location
- One Lincoln Park; Midland, Beaver County, Pennsylvania 15059; United States

Information
- Type: Public Charter
- Motto: Our Students Create Art. We Create Artists.
- Opened: 2005
- School district: Midland Borough School District
- Board of Directors: Lincoln Park Performing Arts Charter School Board of Directors, Phil Orend, President
- CEO: Patrick K. Poling
- Principal: Tonya Milsom
- Teaching staff: 44.12 (FTE)
- Grades: 7–12
- Enrollment: 674 (2024-2025)
- Student to teacher ratio: 15.28
- Colors: Blue and Gold
- Team name: Leopards
- Newspaper: The Siren
- Athletic Director: Mike Bariski
- Website: lppacs.org

The Lincoln Park Performing Arts Charter School is a tuition-free, American public charter school that is located in Midland, Pennsylvania, roughly thirty-five miles (56 km) northwest of Pittsburgh. It enrolls students in grades seven through twelve from home districts in Beaver, Allegheny, Washington, Butler, and Lawrence counties.

== Administration and operations ==
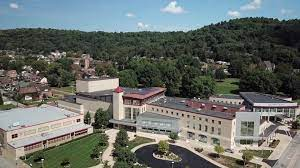
Campus aerial view

This school is run by a seven-member board of directors that appoints the school's administration, which consists of a CEO, Principal, Vice Principal, Director of Curriculum, and Business Manager.

It offers seven majors to its enrolled students: five artistic majors (Theatre, Music, Dance, Media Arts, Writing & Publishing), as well as Pre-Law and Health Science.

The school and its associated performing arts center house a 750-seat mainstage theater with rehearsal and support space, a blackbox theater, three dance studios, music ensemble rehearsal spaces, practice rooms, and fully-equipped TV and recording studios, all in addition to standard academic facilities.

== History ==
Lincoln Park Performing Arts Center is built on the site of Midland Borough's former Lincoln High School. Lincoln High closed in 1987 after the collapse of the local steel industry led to a steep population drop in Midland. As a result, the town became increasingly depressed, and Midland Borough School District, along with town leaders, initiated the construction of the Lincoln Park Performing Arts Center and Lincoln Park Performing Arts Charter School.

== Extracurriculars ==
Lincoln Park offers a variety of clubs and activities typical to a traditional public school, such as student council, National Honor Society, musical ensembles, and a school newspaper.

It also features various extra-curricular extensions of in-class arts instruction, such as improv nights, student-directed one-acts and experimental theatre, student films, fine art showcases, BatCat Press (a student-run independent publisher), various dance and choreography showcases, and a house band, among others.

LPPACS also offers boys' and girls' basketball and golf, and girls' volleyball and tennis, all of which are part of the Western Pennsylvania Interscholastic Athletic League and the Pennsylvania Interscholastic Athletic Association. Lincoln Park's boys' basketball team has won multiple WPIAL championships over the past 10+ years.

== Notable alumni ==
- Madison Campbell, American businesswoman
- Meleek Thomas, Professional Basketball player
