= Vincentian Academy =

Former Catholic school in Pennsylvania, US

The logo of Vincentian Academy, as used in the early 2010s.

Vincentian Academy was a Catholic college preparatory school in McCandless, Pennsylvania, near Pittsburgh. It was located within the Diocese of Pittsburgh and operated from 1932 until its closure in 2020. In February 2020, the Sisters of Charity of Nazareth announced that the school would cease operations at the end of the 2019–2020 academic year.

== Campus ==
The academy occupied three buildings on a 67-acre (27 ha) campus in McCandless Township, a northern suburb of Pittsburgh. At the time of its closure, it had an approximate 13:1 student-to-teacher ratio, and the final enrollment in 2019–2020 was 163 students.

== Academics ==
In its final years, Vincentian Academy maintained a 100 percent university placement rate for graduates. It was one of twelve schools in Pennsylvania authorized to offer the International Baccalaureate (IB) Diploma Programme. By 2019, about 80 percent of Vincentian’s juniors and seniors were enrolled in IB courses, and 84 percent of students taking IB exams earned passing scores.

== History ==
The school was founded by the Vincentian Sisters of Charity in 1932 as Vincentian High School. (The Vincentian Sisters of Charity later merged into the Sisters of Charity of Nazareth.)

=== Affiliation with Duquesne University ===
Early in the 1990s, Duquesne University president John E. Murray Jr. pursued the idea of a university-affiliated secondary school as a model for rigorous education. After discussions with the Vincentian Sisters, an agreement was finalized in 1994, and the first students were admitted in 1995.

The IB curriculum was chosen for its international reputation and rigor. Through this partnership, Vincentian Academy–Duquesne University became the only Catholic IB school in the world formally affiliated with a major university.

In January 2010, Duquesne University announced that it would end its 15-year partnership with the academy, effective June 30 of that year. Although the university withdrew from administrative responsibilities, some benefits, such as limited use of campus facilities, continued.

=== Administrative changes and closure ===
In March 2016, principal Edward Bernot resigned, and Rita Canton succeeded him. Later that year, the Sisters of Charity of Nazareth announced that the school would no longer operate under the “president–principal model.”

On February 25, 2020, citing financial and enrollment challenges, the Sisters of Charity of Nazareth declared that Vincentian Academy would close permanently at the end of the academic year.

== Alma Mater ==
In 2007, the following was adopted as the school’s official Alma Mater:

Oh, Vincentian! We hail our alma mater
Blue and gold, the colors we hold dear
Mind, heart, spirit, guided by our Father
Friendships formed will last throughout the years
Honesty, respect, and human kindness
Tempered with a pride in quality
Integrity, and faith in God define us
Oh, Vincentian! We hail thee
