= Our Lady of Lourdes Regional School =

Private, coeducational school in Coal Township, Pennsylvania, United States

Location
- 2001 Clinton Avenue; Coal Township, (Northumberland County), Pennsylvania 17866; United States; 40°47′10″N 76°35′5″W

Information
- Type: Private, Coeducational
- Religious affiliation: Roman Catholic
- Patron saint: Our Lady of Lourdes
- Established: 1959
- School code: 394-483
- Principal: Mary Chapman
- Grades: Pre-K- 12
- Song: Alma Mater
- Mascot: Raider
- Nickname: "Lourdes Regional"
- Team name: Red Raiders
- Accreditation: Middle States Association of Colleges and Schools
- Yearbook: Grotto
- School Colors: Cerise and White
- Academic Colors: Blue and White
- Website: https://www.lourdesregional.com/

Our Lady of Lourdes Regional School, formerly Our Lady of Lourdes Regional High School, is a private, Roman Catholic Pre-K through 12 school in Edgewood Gardens, Coal Township, Pennsylvania.

It is located in the Roman Catholic Diocese of Harrisburg.

== Background and history ==
Our Lady of Lourdes Regional School was established as St. Edward High School in 1892, located in Shamokin, Pennsylvania, making it the oldest high school in the Diocese of Harrisburg.

The school was renamed Shamokin Central Catholic High School in 1955 when it became an inter-parochial high school, serving 9 parishes in the area. The school moved to its present location in 1959 and was renamed Our Lady of Lourdes (OLOL). In 1964, Mount Carmel Catholic merged with Lourdes. The name was then changed to Our Lady of Lourdes Regional High School. More classrooms were added to the Lourdes building and a cafeteria was built.

During the 2006–2007 school year, Our Lady of Lourdes Regional High School incorporated the Shamokin diocesan elementary school Our Lady Queen of Peace. The following year, the neighboring city of Mount Carmel, Pennsylvania's diocesan elementary school Holy Spirit became a part of the Lourdes' building. These consolidations changed OLOL from a four-year high school into a K-12 school. The school was subsequently renamed as Our Lady of Lourdes Regional School.

When football returned, the mascot was changed to Red Raiders from Speedboys. This was changed by a vote of the student body of Shamokin Central Catholic High School.

== Clubs and extracurricular activities ==
Our Lady of Lourdes offers many activities and clubs for students, including: Student Council, National Honor Society, National Junior Honor Society, French Honor Society, Spanish Honor Society, SADD, Student Ambassadors, Forensics, and Yearbook.

== Athletics ==
=== Boys ===
- Basketball (Winter)
- Soccer (Fall)
- Football (Fall; CO-OP with Mount Carmel)
- Track and Field (Spring; CO-OP with Mount Carmel)
- Golf (Fall)
- Baseball (Spring; CO-OP with Mount Carmel)
- Swimming (Winter; CO-OP with Mount Carmel)

=== Girls ===
- Basketball (Winter)
- Soccer (Fall)
- Softball (Spring)
- Track and Field (Spring; CO-OP with Mount Carmel)
- Swimming (Winter; CO-OP with Mount Carmel)
- Golf (Fall)
- Volleyball (Fall)

== Notable alumni ==
- Bob Chesney, college football coach
