= Leda Health =

American company

- Formerly: Me Too Kits
- Type: Private
- Industry: Healthcare
- Founded: 2019; 7 years ago
- Founders: Madison Campbell, Liesel Vaidya
- Headquarters: Brooklyn, NY and Pittsburgh, PA, US
- Services: Early evidence kit
- Number of employees: 1–5 (2024)
- Website: leda.co

Leda Health, formerly known as MeToo Kits, is an American company founded in 2019 with offices in New York City and in Pittsburgh, Pennsylvania. Leda Health aimed at providing early-evidence kits for DNA and other services for sexual assault victims.

== History ==
Leda Health was founded in 2019 by Madison Campbell and Liesel Vaidya in Brooklyn, New York as MeToo Kits and later rebranded as Leda Health after the Greek myth of Leda. Campbell's decision to start Leda Health was driven by her own experience as a survivor of sexual assault, as she sought to help survivors face challenges in collecting evidence. Leda Health developed an "early evidence kit" that would allow sexual assault survivors to collect evidence without the need to visit a hospital or police station. The company introduced an at-home alternative to standard hospital rape kits, allowing assault survivors to collect DNA evidence themselves. In 2021, Leda Health expanded its services to include Plan B, STI testing provided in partnership with an external distributor.

In 2022, Leda Health was included in the Fortune's Change the World list. As of November 2022, Leda Health raised $9.2 million in venture capital from investors including New York Ventures, Asymmetry Ventures and the Nashville Entrepreneur Center.

In 2023, a bill was passed in Maryland, acknowledging the existence and potential benefits of self-administered evidence collection kits. However, Leda Health was later accused of misleading consumers and harmful marketing practices for misrepresenting the bill and marketing direct to consumers. In February 2024, the state of Maryland introduced a house bill BH1047 which states that selling, offering for sale, or distributing a certain self-administered sexual assault evidence collection kit is an unfair, abusive or deceptive trade practice.

In October 2023, Campbell announced that Leda Health had opened a second headquarters location in Lawrenceville, one of the largest neighborhoods in Pittsburgh, Pennsylvania. Construction of the new headquarters was expected for completion by November 2023. The company also remained headquartered in the Brooklyn borough of New York City.

== Legal and regulatory issues ==
Leda Health's kit faced criticism over potential evidence contamination and possible inadmissibility in court. Over these concerns, the kits were banned in Washington and cease and desist letters in several other states were sent to the company asking to stop selling their kits.

In October 2025, a settlement with the Pennsylvania Attorney General said Leda Health must provide a written warning to consumers that its products do not meet the same standards as hospital-based evidence collection services.
