= Heidelberg, Pennsylvania =

Borough in Pennsylvania, US

- Borough
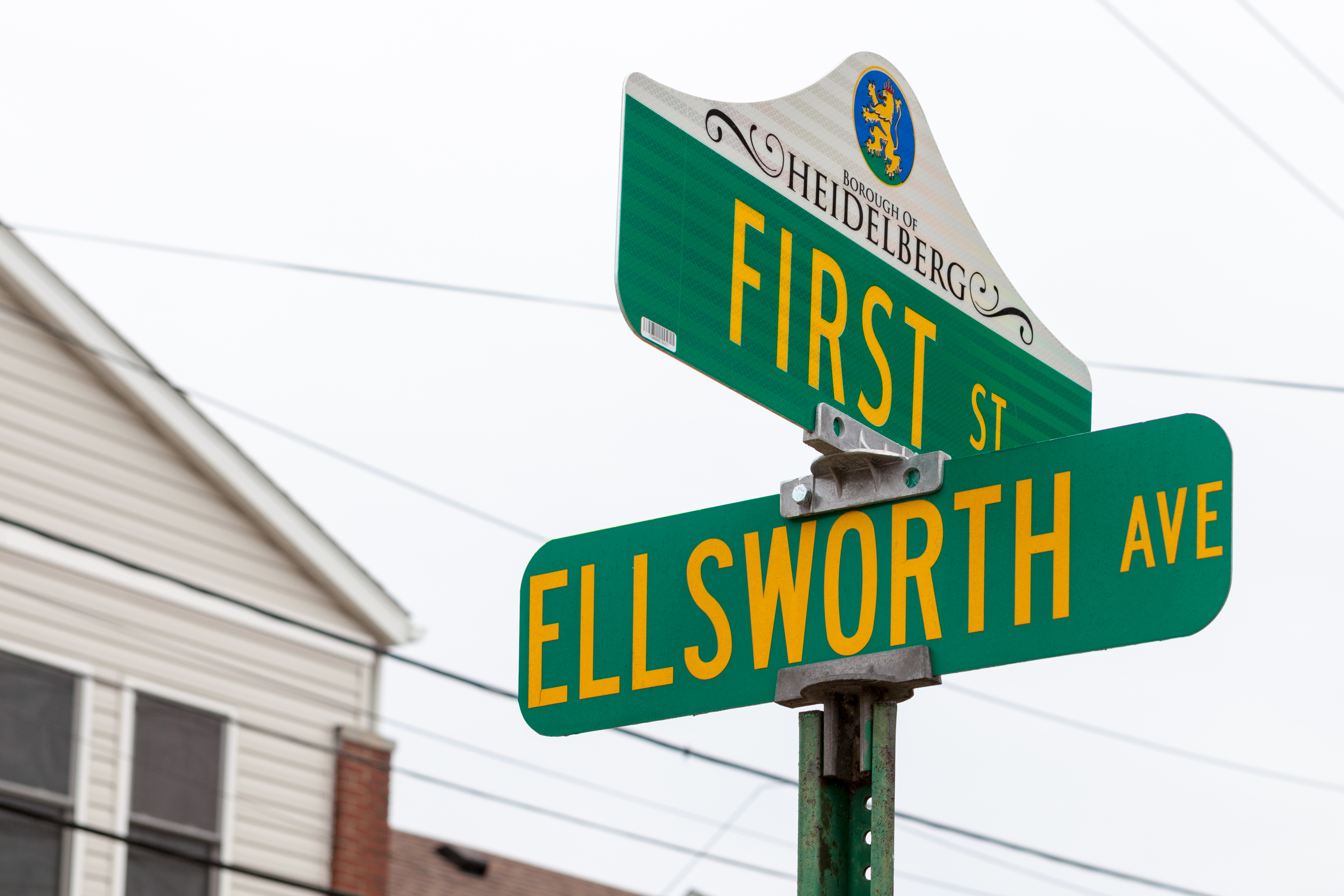
- Heidelberg street signs

- Location in Allegheny County and the state of Pennsylvania.
- Coordinates: 40°23′27″N 80°5′26″W
- Country: United States
- State: Pennsylvania
- County: Allegheny
- Named after: Heidelberg, Germany

Area
  - Total: 0.29 sq mi (0.74 km^{2})
  - Land: 0.29 sq mi (0.74 km^{2})
  - Water: 0 sq mi (0.00 km^{2})

Population (2020)
  - Total: 1,288
  - Density: 4,485.4/sq mi (1,731.84/km^{2})
- Time zone: UTC-5 (Eastern (EST))
  - Summer (DST): UTC-4 (EDT)
- ZIP code: 15106
- Area code: 412
- FIPS code: 42-33592
- Website: Borough of Heidelberg

Heidelberg is a borough located southwest of Pittsburgh in Allegheny County, Pennsylvania, United States. The population was 1,288 at the 2020 census. The borough was named after Heidelberg in Germany, the native home of a large share of the early settlers.

== Geography ==
Heidelberg is located at 40°23′27″N 80°5′26″W (40.390919, −80.090693).

According to the United States Census Bureau, the borough has a total area of 0.3 square miles (0.78 km^{2}), all land.

== Sports ==
Heidelberg Raceway was located in the town until 1973.

Heidelberg has a rich amateur soccer history. Amateur soccer teams from Heidelberg Borough were nationally competitive from the 1920s through the 1950s, winning the amateur national title in 1927, 1929 and 1955.

== Surrounding communities ==
Heidelberg is bordered primarily by Scott Township; its only other border is with Collier Township to the west.

== Demographics ==
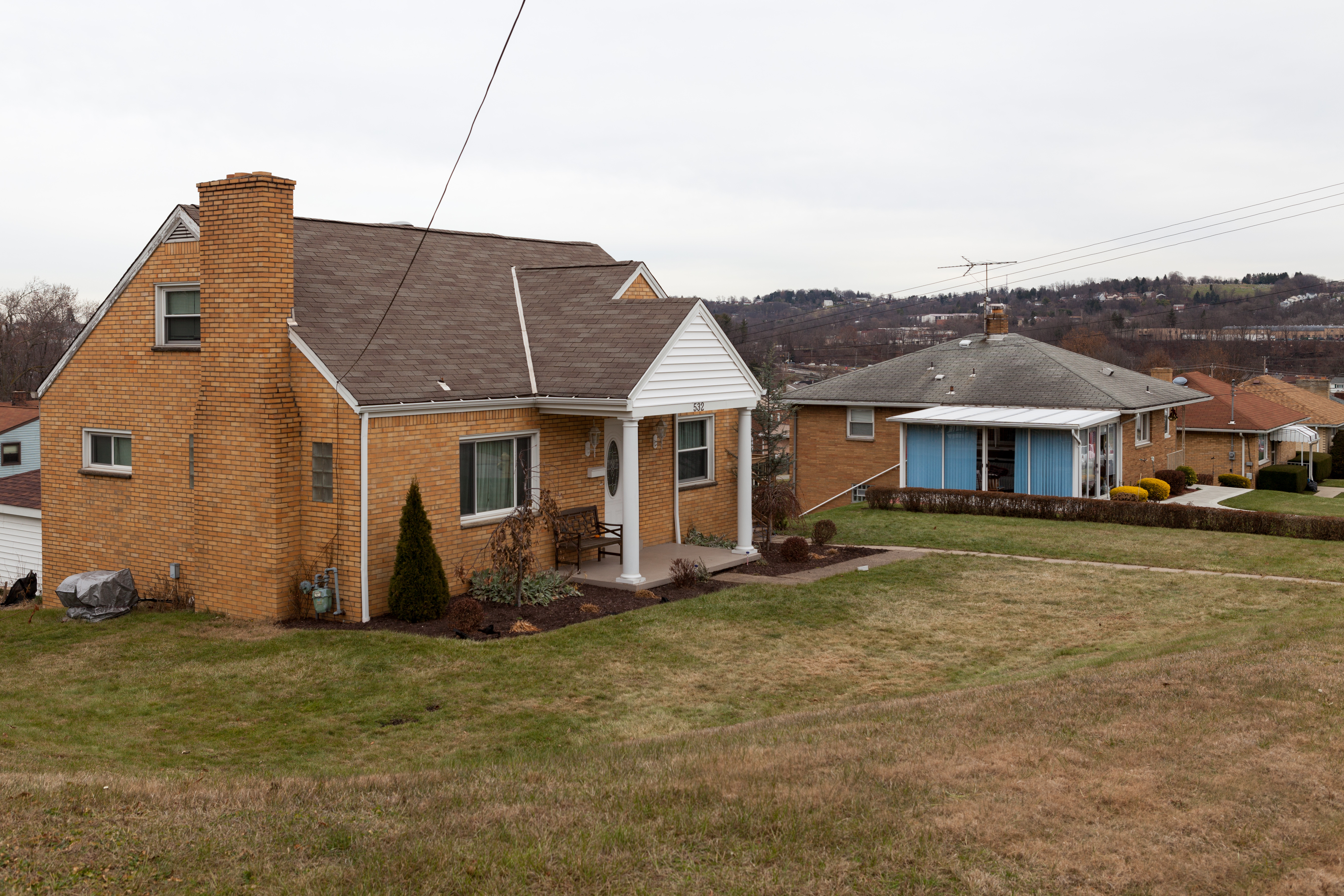
A row of houses on Madison Ave

Historical population
Census	Pop.	Note	%±
1910	1,848		—
1920	2,094		13.3%
1930	2,130		1.7%
1940	2,239		5.1%
1950	2,250		0.5%
1960	2,118		−5.9%
1970	2,034		−4.0%
1980	1,606		−21.0%
1990	1,238		−22.9%
2000	1,225		−1.1%
2010	1,244		1.6%
2020	1,288		3.5%

As of the 2000 census, there were 1,225 people, 571 households, and 331 families residing in the borough. The population density was 4,654.3 people per square mile (1,797.0 people/km^{2}). There were 606 housing units at an average density of 2,302.5 per square mile (889.0/km^{2}). The racial makeup of the borough was 97.6% White, 1.0% African American, 0.2% Asian, 0.2% from other races, and 0.9% from two or more races. Hispanic or Latino of any race were 0.6% of the population.

There were 571 households, out of which 21.0% had children under the age of 18 living with them, 42.6% were married couples living together, 12.1% had a female householder with no husband present, and 42.0% were non-families. 35.6% of all households were made up of individuals, and 16.8% had someone living alone who was 65 years of age or older. The average household size was 2.15 and the average family size was 2.79.

In the borough the population was spread out, with 18.9% under the age of 18, 7.2% from 18 to 24, 30.5% from 25 to 44, 22.9% from 45 to 64, and 20.6% who were 65 years of age or older. The median age was 41 years. For every 100 females there were 87.3 males. For every 100 females age 18 and over, there were 87.2 males.

The median income for a household in the borough was $35,000, and the median income for a family was $41,023. Males had a median income of $32,857 versus $26,298 for females. The per capita income for the borough was $18,713. About 8.9% of families and 9.8% of the population were below the poverty line, including 15.0% of those under age 18 and 8.8% of those age 65 or over.

== Government and politics ==
Presidential election results
Year	Republican	Democratic	Third parties
2020	44% 337	54% 411	0.4% 3
2016	45% 273	49% 296	6% 33
2012	42% 232	57% 312	1% 5

== Education ==
Heidelberg is served by the Chartiers Valley School District.
