= Mathematics, Civics and Sciences Charter School =

Location
- 447 N Broad Street; Philadelphia, Pennsylvania 19123; United States; 39.961077°N 75.161633°W

Information
- School type: Charter
- Established: 1999
- CEEB code: 393327
- Principal: Andre Glenn, Lonnie Diggs
- CAO: Veronica Joyner
- Staff: 63
- Teaching staff: 66
- Grades: 1–12
- Enrollment: 1020 (as of 2016)
- Colours: Blue and white
- Mascot: Elephant
- Website: www.mcscs.org

The Mathematics, Civics and Sciences Charter School (MCSCS) was a charter school serving students in grades 1–12 in Philadelphia, Pennsylvania, United States. Founded in 1999, the school was located in the Center City neighborhood and had a 100% graduation rate in 2015–2016.

== History ==
The Mathematics, Civics and Sciences Charter School (MCSCS) was established in 1999 in Philadelphia, Pennsylvania. Initially, the school opened its doors to over 720 students, serving grades 1 through 12. MCSCS began with an emphasis on mathematics, civics, and sciences. Over the course of four years, the school gradually expanded, adding one grade level each year until it fully encompassed all grades from 1st through 12th.

=== Governance ===
The school was led by a chief administrative officer and a principal. A six-member board of trustees met with the CAO and principal regularly.

== Curriculum ==
The school used a back-to-basics curriculum. Students in grades 5 through 12 were required to select a school-to-college course of study, including law, medical, education, computer science, and accounting.

As of 2015, the school offered AP courses.

== Closing ==
The school closed at the end of the 2023–2024 school year and reopened in October 2024 as a tutoring site called the Mathematics, Civics and Sciences Educational Center.

== Notable alumni ==
- Mike Watkins (born 1995), Israeli basketball player
