= Mount Alvernia High School (Pittsburgh) =

Private, all-female school in Pittsburgh, Pennsylvania, United States

Location
- 146 Hawthorne Road; Pittsburgh, (Allegheny County), Pennsylvania 15209; United States; 40°29′34″N 79°58′13″W

Information
- Type: Private, All-female
- Motto: Deus meus et omnia (My God and my all)
- Religious affiliations: Roman Catholic; Franciscan
- Established: 1936
- Closed: 2011
- CEEB code: 393720
- Principal: Kimberly Minick
- Grades: 9–12
- Colors: Forest Green, Athletic Gold and White
- Team name: Lions
- Accreditation: Middle States Association of Colleges and Schools
- Tuition: $6,925 (2010–11)
- Website: www.mtalvernia.com

Mount Alvernia High School was a private, all-girls, Roman Catholic high school in Pittsburgh, Pennsylvania; it is within the Diocese of Pittsburgh.

== History ==
Mount Alvernia High School was established in 1936 and is located on the grounds of the Franciscan Sisters of Millvale.

The school was closed in June 2011 due to declining enrollment.

In 2022, the Mount Alvernia campus, including the school and a chapel, was sold to a real estate development group.
