= Scott Township, Allegheny County, Pennsylvania =

Township in Pennsylvania, US

Scott Township
- CDP and Township
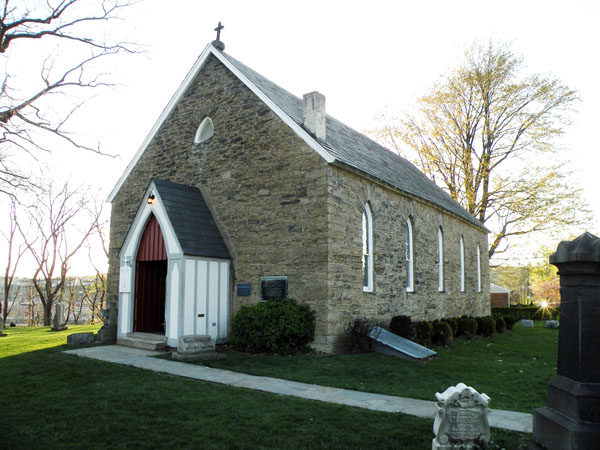
- St. Luke's Episcopal Church

- Flag Coat of arms Logo

- Location in Allegheny County and state of Pennsylvania
- Coordinates: 40°23′29″N 80°4′47″W
- Country: United States
- State: Pennsylvania
- County: Allegheny

Government
  - Type: Commissioners
  - President of Commissioners: Stacey Altman (R)

Area
  - Total: 3.91 sq mi (10.12 km^{2})
  - Land: 3.91 sq mi (10.12 km^{2})
  - Water: 0 sq mi (0.00 km^{2})

Population (2010)
  - Total: 17,024
  - Estimate (2018): 16,519
  - Density: 4,280.9/sq mi (1,652.88/km^{2})
- Time zone: UTC-5 (Eastern (EST))
  - Summer (DST): UTC-4 (EDT)
- ZIP Codes: 15106, 15220, 15243, 15216, 15017
- Area code: 412
- FIPS code: 42-003-68388
- Website: Township website

Scott Township is a township in Allegheny County, Pennsylvania, United States. The population was 17,024 at the 2010 census.

== Geography ==
Scott Township is located at 40°23′29″N 80°4′46″W (40.391469, -80.079657).

According to the United States Census Bureau, the township has a total area of 4.0 square miles (10 km^{2}), all land.

== Surrounding and adjacent communities ==
Scott Township has nine land borders, including the Pittsburgh neighborhood of East Carnegie and Green Tree to the north, the Pittsburgh neighborhood of Banksville to the northeast, Mt. Lebanon to the east, Upper St. Clair Township to the south, Bridgeville to the southwest, Collier Township and Heidelberg to the west, and Carnegie to the northwest. A short segment of Chartiers Creek separates Scott from Rosslyn Farms to the northwest.

== Demographics ==
Historical population
Census	Pop.	Note	%±
1870	1,807		—
1880	1,532		−15.2%
1890	2,651		73.0%
1900	3,975		49.9%
1910	5,737		44.3%
1920	4,927		−14.1%
1930	6,203		25.9%
1940	6,297		1.5%
1950	8,686		37.9%
1960	19,094		119.8%
1970	21,856		14.5%
1980	20,413		−6.6%
1990	17,118		−16.1%
2000	17,288		1.0%
2010	17,024		−1.5%
2020	17,649		3.7%
2024 (est.)	17,011		−3.6%

At the 2000 census there were 17,288 people, 7,835 households, and 4,583 families living in the township. The population density was 4,350.8 inhabitants per square mile (1,679.9/km^{2}). There were 8,163 housing units at an average density of 2,054.3 per square mile (793.2/km^{2}). The racial makeup of the township was 91.35% White, 1.15% Black or African American, 0.08% Native American, 6.17% Asian, 0.01% Pacific Islander, 0.23% from other races, and 1.01% from two or more races. Hispanic or Latino of any race were 0.68%.

There were 7,835 households, 22.5% had children under the age of 18 living with them, 48.3% were married couples living together, 7.6% had a female householder with no husband present, and 41.5% were non-families. 36.8% of households were made up of individuals, and 14.7% were one person aged 65 or older. The average household size was 2.14 and the average family size was 2.83.

The age distribution was 18.6% under the age of 18, 5.2% from 18 to 24, 31.6% from 25 to 44, 22.5% from 45 to 64, and 22.1% 65 or older. The median age was 42 years. For every 100 females there were 88.9 males. For every 100 females age 18 and over, there were 84.7 males.

The median household income was $44,434 and the median family income was $54,716. Males had a median income of $42,095 versus $31,499 for females. The per capita income for the township was $24,439. About 4.5% of families and 7.2% of the population were below the poverty line, including 8.1% of those under age 18 and 8.6% of those age 65 or over.

== Government and politics ==
Presidential Elections Results
Year	Republican	Democratic	Third Parties
2020	42% 4,138	55% 5,387	1% 113
2016	45% 3,813	53% 4,482	2% 89
2012	49% 4,007	51% 4,176	0% 77

== Education ==
Scott Township is served by the Chartiers Valley School District.

== Events ==
Until 2015, the world's largest pinball tournament, Pinburgh, was held in Scott Township at the PAPA facility. In 2015, the tournament was moved to the David L. Lawrence Convention Center in downtown Pittsburgh. The Professional and Amateur Pinball Association (PAPA), still headquartered in Scott Township (Carnegie, PA mailing address), manages Pinburgh, along with the World Pinball Championships.
