= Carlynton Junior/Senior High School =

Coordinates: 40.42483°N 80.09722°W

- 435 Kings Highway; Carnegie, PA 15106; United States

Information
- Type: Public
- School district: Carlynton School District
- Principal: Michael Loughren
- Grades: 7–12
- Enrollment: 637 (2023-2024)
- Colors: Green and Gold
- Mascot: Mighty Golden Cougars
- Website: http://www.carlynton.k12.pa.us/cms/One.aspx

Carlynton Junior/Senior High School is a public school located in Robinson Township in Allegheny County, Pennsylvania.

== History ==
Although located outside of the communities it serves, the high school serves students from the nearby boroughs of Carnegie, Crafton and Rosslyn Farms. The school's mascot is the Golden Cougar. The school is part of the Carlynton School District.

== Notable alumni ==
Bill Cowher - NFL football coach, player and Hall-of-Famer
