= Montour High School =

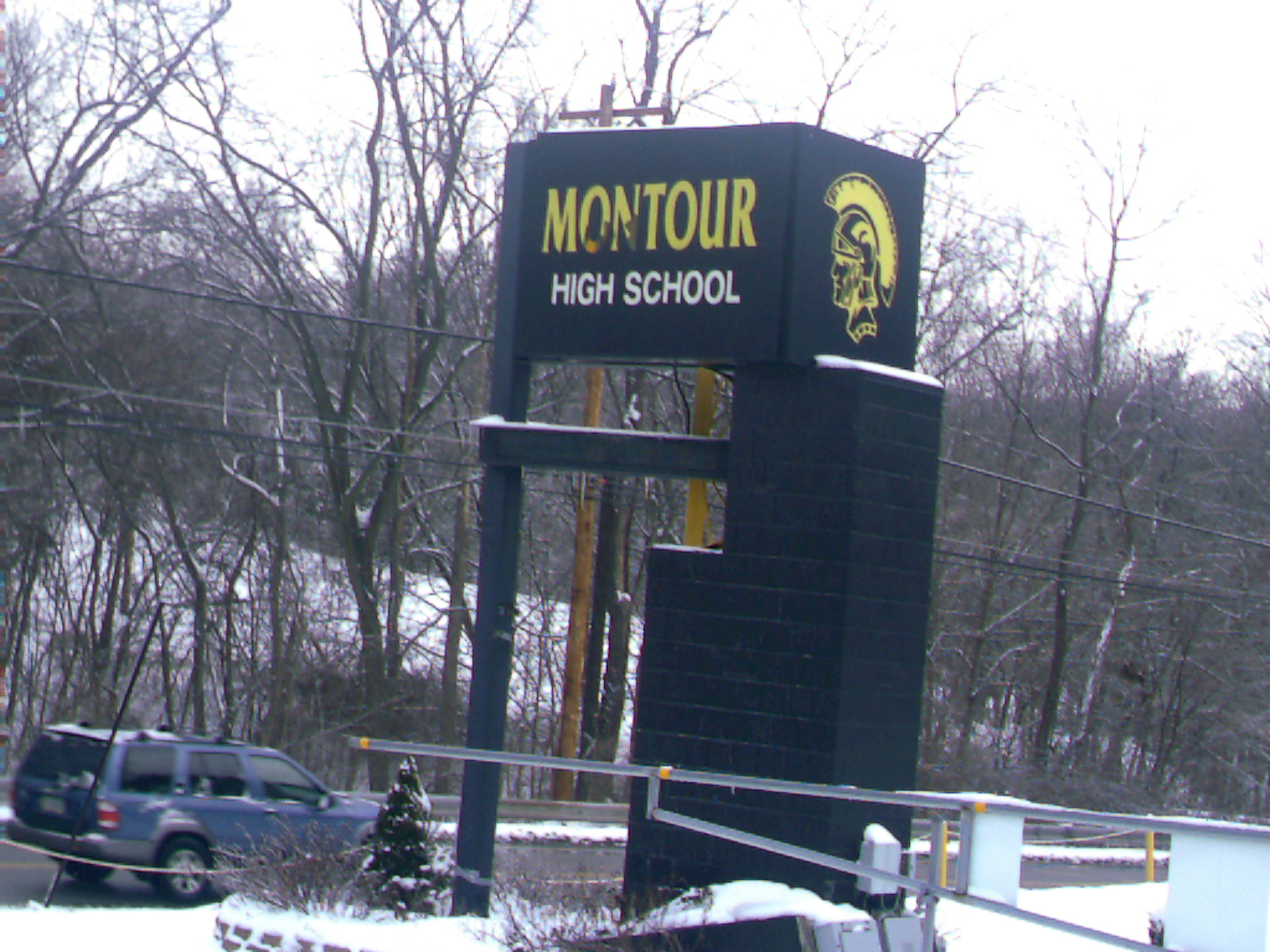
- Montour High School's Sign

Location
- 223 Clever Road; Robinson, Pennsylvania; United States; 40.46722°N 80.11861°W

Information
- Type: Public
- Established: 1956; 70 years ago
- School district: Montour School District
- Principal: Todd Price
- Faculty: 75
- Teaching staff: 60.35 (FTE)
- Enrollment: 936 (2022–2023)
- Student to teacher ratio: 15.51
- Colors: Black and Gold
- Mascot: Spartan
- Website: highschool.montourschools.com
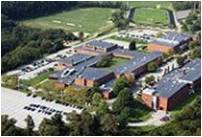
- Montour High School's Campus

Map of Allegheny County, Pennsylvania Public School Districts: The Montour School District (pink) is at the right center, just west of Ty Gal (green). In addition, the district borders Sto-Rox (Orange) and Carlynton (Blue) to the east, Chartiers Valley (Orange) to the south, West Allegheny (Blue) and Moon Area (Green) to the west and Cornell (Blue) to the north.

Montour High School is a public high school in Robinson, Pennsylvania, United States. It is the only high school in the Montour School District and serves the suburban towns of Kennedy and Robinson Townships, and the boroughs of Ingram, Pennsbury Village, and Thornburg. Established in 1956, the campus that serves students in grades 9 through 12 opened in 1957.

According to the National Center for Education Statistics, in the 2022–2023 school year, the school reported an enrollment of 936 pupils in grades 9th through 12th.

The campus is divided into two buildings: the main building (4 stories of classrooms, cafeteria, intermediate gymnasium, and weight room), and the athletic center, a multifunctional sports complex with a pool, indoor running track, basketball/volleyball court, cardio room, dance room, cheer/wrestling room, and a golf simulator. The high school building underwent renovation, high school students and (isolated) 6th graders attended David E. Williams Middle school, and the middle and elementary students were split among the three primary schools for the 2010–2011 school year. The new high school is asbestos free and includes newly renovated classrooms and a cafeteria. The two buildings are connected through an underground tunnel, running under the main driveway. The high school opened by the beginning of the 2011–2012 school year.

== Interscholastic sports ==
Montour High School is a member of the Western Pennsylvania Interscholastic Athletic League, a division of the Pennsylvania Interscholastic Athletic League. The only school-sponsored sports that compete in another league are Ice Hockey (Pennsylvania Interscholastic Hockey League), Boys & Girls Bowling (Western Pennsylvania Interscholastic Bowling League) and Ultimate Frisbee (Pittsburgh High School Ultimate League).

Fall	Winter	Spring
Cross Country (boys and girls)	Basketball (boys and girls)	Baseball
Soccer (boys and girls)	Golf (boys)	
Football	Wrestling	Tennis (boys)
Tennis (girls)	Ice hockey	Softball
Volleyball (girls)	Indoor Track and Field (boys and girls)	Volleyball (boys)
	Gymnastics (girls)	Outdoor Track and Field (boys and girls)
	Bowling (boys and girls)	Ultimate Frisbee (boys and girls)

== Notable alumni ==
- Dean Caliguire – NFL player
- Tony Fratto – Former Deputy White House Press Secretary under President George W. Bush,
- Nick Haden – Professional football player
- John Hufnagel – Professional football player and professional football coach
- Michael Keaton – Actor
- Cassidy Krug – Olympian at 2012 Olympic games competing in the Women's 3-meter Springboard.
- Ted Kwalick – Professional football player
- Luca Crusifino; Roman Macek – WWE Superstar

Notable bands that have formed while attending Montour High School and toured nationally are:

- Once Nothing
