= Ingram, Pennsylvania =

Borough in Pennsylvania, US

- Borough
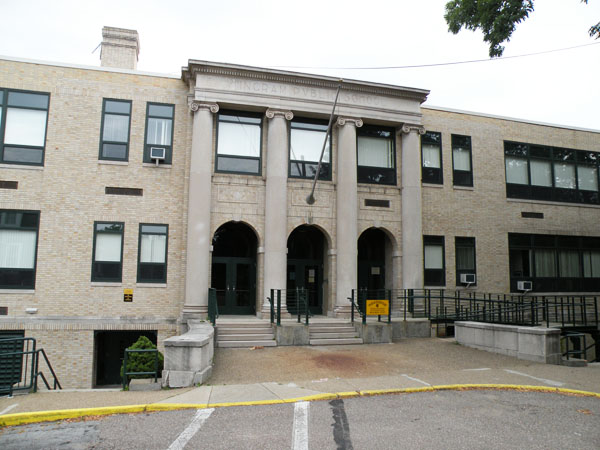
- Former Ingram Public School

- Location in Allegheny County and the state of Pennsylvania.
- Coordinates: 40°26′43″N 80°4′1″W
- Country: United States
- State: Pennsylvania
- County: Allegheny
- Established: 1902

Government
  - Type: Borough
  - Mayor: Sharon Stetz

Area
  - Total: 0.43 sq mi (1.12 km^{2})
  - Land: 0.43 sq mi (1.12 km^{2})
  - Water: 0 sq mi (0.00 km^{2})

Population (2020)
  - Total: 3,391
  - Density: 7,822.0/sq mi (3,020.09/km^{2})
- Time zone: UTC-5 (Eastern (EST))
  - Summer (DST): UTC-4 (EDT)
- FIPS code: 42-37000
- Website: www.ingramborough.org

Ingram is a borough in Allegheny County, Pennsylvania, United States. The population was 3,391 at the 2020 census.

== Education ==
The borough is located in the Montour School District, which educates the children of Kennedy Township, Robinson Township, Pennsbury Village, Thornburg, and the borough of Ingram.

== Geography ==
Ingram is located at 40°26′43″N 80°4′1″W (40.445254, -80.067043).

According to the United States Census Bureau, the borough has a total area of 0.4 square miles (1.0 km^{2}), all land.

== Surrounding neighborhoods ==
Ingram has four borders, including Crafton to the south and the Pittsburgh neighborhoods of Windgap to the north, Crafton Heights to the east, and Fairywood to the west.

== Government and politics ==
Presidential election results
| Year | Republican | Democratic | Third parties |
|---|---|---|---|
| 2020 | 38% 754 | 59% 1,151 | 1% 32 |
| 2016 | 39% 659 | 57% 951 | 4% 63 |
| 2012 | 41% 635 | 58% 908 | 1% 24 |

== Demographics ==
Historical population
| Census | Pop. | Note | %± |
|---|---|---|---|
| 1910 | 2,037 | | — |
| 1920 | 2,900 | | 42.4% |
| 1930 | 3,866 | | 33.3% |
| 1940 | 3,904 | | 1.0% |
| 1950 | 4,236 | | 8.5% |
| 1960 | 4,730 | | 11.7% |
| 1970 | 4,902 | | 3.6% |
| 1980 | 4,346 | | −11.3% |
| 1990 | 3,901 | | −10.2% |
| 2000 | 3,712 | | −4.8% |
| 2010 | 3,330 | | −10.3% |
| 2020 | 3,391 | | 1.8% |

=== 2020 census ===
As of the 2020 census, Ingram had a population of 3,391. The median age was 40.5 years. 19.0% of residents were under the age of 18 and 18.0% of residents were 65 years of age or older. For every 100 females there were 97.4 males, and for every 100 females age 18 and over there were 95.1 males age 18 and over.

100.0% of residents lived in urban areas, while 0.0% lived in rural areas.

There were 1,549 households in Ingram, of which 24.9% had children under the age of 18 living in them. Of all households, 36.7% were married-couple households, 22.9% were households with a male householder and no spouse or partner present, and 32.9% were households with a female householder and no spouse or partner present. About 37.5% of all households were made up of individuals and 13.5% had someone living alone who was 65 years of age or older.

There were 1,649 housing units, of which 6.1% were vacant. The homeowner vacancy rate was 1.2% and the rental vacancy rate was 4.7%.

Racial composition as of the 2020 census
| Race | Number | Percent |
|---|---|---|
| White | 2,783 | 82.1% |
| Black or African American | 307 | 9.1% |
| American Indian and Alaska Native | 10 | 0.3% |
| Asian | 43 | 1.3% |
| Native Hawaiian and Other Pacific Islander | 0 | 0.0% |
| Some other race | 24 | 0.7% |
| Two or more races | 224 | 6.6% |
| Hispanic or Latino (of any race) | 59 | 1.7% |

=== 2000 census ===
At the 2000 census, there were 3,712 people, 1,565 households, and 971 families living in the borough. The population density was 8,525.1 inhabitants per square mile (3,291.6/km^{2}). There were 1,650 housing units at an average density of 3,789.4 per square mile (1,463.1/km^{2}). The racial makeup of the borough was 95.42% White, 3.07% African American, 0.22% Native American, 0.54% Asian, 0.22% from other races, and 0.54% from two or more races. Hispanic or Latino of any race were 0.57%.

There were 1,565 households, 28.8% had children under the age of 18 living with them, 45.8% were married couples living together, 12.5% had a female householder with no husband present, and 37.9% were non-families. 33.1% of households were made up of individuals, and 12.3% were one person aged 65 or older. The average household size was 2.33 and the average family size was 3.01.

The age distribution was 22.7% under the age of 18, 8.4% from 18 to 24, 30.9% from 25 to 44, 21.8% from 45 to 64, and 16.2% 65 or older. The median age was 38 years. For every 100 females there were 88.2 males. For every 100 females age 18 and over, there were 84.8 males.

The median household income was $35,308 and the median family income was $45,824. Males had a median income of $32,500 versus $27,417 for females. The per capita income for the borough was $18,668. About 7.4% of families and 8.2% of the population were below the poverty line, including 9.9% of those under age 18 and 6.5% of those age 65 or over.

== Emergency services coverage ==
Ingram borough has their own police department, the Ingram Borough Police Department.

Prior to April 2016, fire protection was provided by the Ingram Volunteer Fire Company, which had 3 stations spread out through the small community. "The borough now contracts with the City of Pittsburgh to provide fire protection services. This landmark agreement, which took effect in April of 2016, significantly increased the number of highly trained firemen responding to fires in Ingram Borough. This agreement resulted in increased public safety and operational cost savings for the taxpayer."

The Ingram Community Emergency Service Inc. is staffed by volunteer E.M.T.s and paramedics. Ingram Ambulance is the only remaining all Volunteer ALS service in Allegheny county. They provide mutual aide for surrounding services as well.

| Preceded by Thornburg | Bordering communities of Pittsburgh | Succeeded by Crafton |
