= Pennsbury =

Pennsbury may refer to:

- Pennsbury Manor, the home of Pennsylvania founder William Penn
  - Pennsbury High School, a school near Pennsbury Manor that is a namesake of it
  - Pennsbury School District, the school district near Pennsbury Manor that is a namesake of it
- Pennsbury Village, Pennsylvania
- Pennsbury Township, Pennsylvania
