= Kinley McMillan =

Presbyterian clergymen and American football coach

Biographical details
- Born: c. 1866
- Died: September 30, 1950 (aged 84); Pittsburgh, Pennsylvania, U.S.
- Education: Wooster (1886); Princeton Seminary (1889)

Playing career

Baseball
- 1886: Wooster

Coaching career (HC unless noted)

Football
- 1889–1890: Wooster

Head coaching record
- Overall: 7–0

Kinley McMillan (c. 1866 – September 30, 1950) was an American Presbyterian clergyman and college football coach. He was an 1886 graduate of the College of Wooster and an 1889 graduate of Princeton Seminary.

After graduating from seminary, McMillan returned to his alma mater to serve as a minister. During that time, he also organized the school's first varsity football team. He served as the head coach of the 1889 and 1890 squads, accumulating a record of 7 wins and no losses. During the 1889 season opener against Denison University, Wooster scored the first points in Ohio college football history.

McMillan also served as a pastor in McKeesport, Pennsylvania and Baltimore. On August 14, 1950, McMillan was struck by a freight train of the Pennsylvania Railroad in the Sheraden neighborhood of Pittsburgh. He died from his injuries several weeks later, on September 30, at Allegheny General Hospital in Pittsburgh.

In 1967, McMillan was honored as a charter member of the College of Wooster Hall of Fame. He was noted for his oratory abilities and his strong devotion to preaching the Gospel.
