= Carlynton School District =

School district in Pennsylvania

Coordinates: 40.41362°N 80.08398°W

- Carlynton School District, light blue, is shown at the left of center, just west of Pittsburgh, green.

Address
- 435 Kings Hwy Carnegie, Allegheny County, Pennsylvania, 15106; United States

District information
- Type: Public
- Grades: K-12

Students and staff
- Athletic conference: WPIAL Class = 2A
- District mascot: The Mighty Golden Cougars
- Colors: Green and Gold

Other information
- Website: https://www.carlynton.net/

The Carlynton School District is a small, suburban, public school district located approximately six miles west of downtown Pittsburgh, Pennsylvania. The district covers five square miles, including the Boroughs of Carnegie, Crafton and Rosslyn Farms. The district's name comes from these communities (Carnegie, Rosslyn Farms and Crafton). According to 2000 federal census data, it serves a resident population of 15,559. In while the median family income was $46,345.
