= The Mall at Robinson =

Coordinates: 40.4546°N 80.1572°W

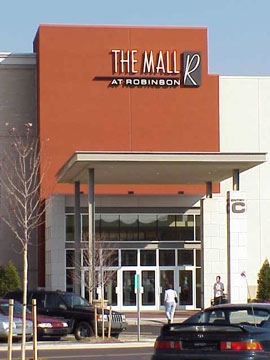
- One of the main entrances to The Mall at Robinson
- Location: Robinson Township, Pennsylvania
- Opened: October 2001
- Developer: Forest City Enterprises
- Manager: Kohan Retail Investment Group
- Owner: Kohan Retail Investment Group
- Num. of stores: 90
- Num. of anchor tenants: 4 (3 open, 1 vacant)
- Floor area: 872,000 sq ft (81,000 m^{2})
- Floors: 2
- Website: www.shoprobinsonmall.com

The Mall at Robinson is a super-regional shopping mall located just off the Parkway West (I-376) and PA Route 60 in Robinson Township, Allegheny County, Pennsylvania, five minutes east of the Pittsburgh International Airport and 15 minutes from downtown Pittsburgh. Opened in October 2001, it consists of 872,000 square feet (81,000 m^{2}) of retail space and sits on over 200 acres (0.81 km^{2}). The mall is owned and managed by Kohan Retail Investment Group of Great Neck, New York.

The mall sits adjacent to Robinson Town Centre, located in the center of a growing retail area that includes Settlers Ridge and The Pointe at North Fayette in North Fayette Township, Pennsylvania.

== Anchors ==
Anchor stores are Dick's Sporting Goods, JCPenney, and Macy's.

Macy's is the northernmost anchor with the former Sears serving as the southernmost anchor. The Dick's Sporting Goods store sits in the south east corner with JCPenney situated on the west side of the two-floor complex.

A free-standing Kaufmann's department store was built in 1998 and sat as the only operating store until the remainder of the mall property was opened in 2001. The Kaufmann's store became Macy's in 2006.

On May 31, 2018, it was announced that Sears would be closing as part of a plan to close 72 stores nationwide. The store closed in September 2018.

== Stores ==
The mall is home to approximately 90 stores including American Eagle Outfitters, Carter's, FYE, Hot Topic, LOFT, Rue 21, Victoria's Secret, White House Black Market and Zumiez. The mall's food court, which has 10 eateries (7 of which are open as of September 2026), sits on the second floor near the former Sears.

== See also ==
- Robinson Town Centre
