= Fairywood =

- Neighborhood of Pittsburgh
- Coordinates: 40.449°N 80.082°W
- Country: United States
- State: Pennsylvania
- County: Allegheny County
- City: Pittsburgh

Area
  - Total: 0.969 sq mi (2.51 km^{2})

Population (2010)
  - Total: 1,002
  - Density: 1,030/sq mi (399/km^{2})

Fairywood is a neighborhood on Pittsburgh, Pennsylvania's West End. It has a zip code of 15205, and has representation on Pittsburgh City Council by the council member for District 2 (West Neighborhoods). It is the westernmost neighborhood in the City of Pittsburgh.

It was once home to several public housing developments, notably Broadhead Manor, which was torn down after the neighborhood largely depopulated and crime increased. Another Section 8 development was Westgate Village, which was converted into a gated apartment community called Emerald Gardens.

During the 1960s and 1970s, construction began on a four-lane highway called the Industrial Highway, but it was never completed and has become an abandoned ghost highway. It was meant to connect PA 60 to PA 51 in the Esplen neighborhood of Pittsburgh.

Most commercial establishments have moved out of Fairywood; however, UPS does have a terminal there, along with the Pittsburgh division of ModCloth. There is also a Giant Eagle warehouse and Amazon sortation center PIT5 (scheduled to close 2/26/2026).

== Surrounding and adjacent neighborhoods ==
Fairywood has four land borders, including the Pittsburgh neighborhood of Windgap to the northeast and east, Ingram and Crafton to the southeast, and Robinson Township to the south, southwest and west. Adjacent to Fairywood across Chartiers Creek to the north and east is Kennedy Township.

== See also ==
- List of Pittsburgh neighborhoods
