= Sheraden Homestead =

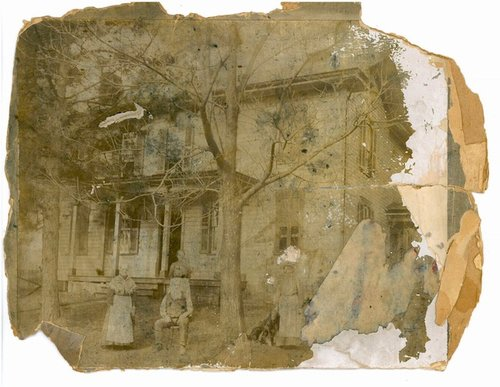

- Location within Pittsburgh
- 40°27′15.55″N 80°3′10.86″W
- Location: 2803 Bergman Street (Sheraden (Pittsburgh)), Pittsburgh, Pennsylvania, USA

History
- Built: Between 1875 and 1885

Site notes
- Area: Sheraden
- Governing body: John G. Blakeley

Sheraden Homestead is located at 2803 Bergman Street in the Sheraden neighborhood of Pittsburgh, Pennsylvania. Built between 1875 and 1885 in the Italianate architectural style, the building is most notable for two of its former residents, William Sheraden and William Sheraden Brockstoce.

== History ==
The Sheraden Homestead was built on a tract of 122 acres that served as a farmland in what was at the time Chartiers Township. The land was owned by William Sheraden and his family, and they constructed the homestead during a period of prosperity. William Sheraden purchased the land in 1857 and by 1880 it was the third most valuable farm in the region. In the late 19th century William Sheraden began to subdivide parts of his farm property, selling lots for residential development. This created a new neighborhood which became known as Sheraden or Sheradenville, which was formally incorporated as a borough in 1894. Sheraden was later annexed into the city of Pittsburgh in 1907. William Sheraden died in August 1900 and left the homestead to two of his daughters. William S. Brockstoce, William Sheraden’s grandson, moved into the homestead in 1905. William S. Brockstoce was a secretary of the Sheraden Savings and Loan Association, a building contractor, and an amateur horticulturist. He was responsible for constructing many more homes in the area. He became nationally known for his horticulture work because of his creation of new breeds of peonies. His work still lives on with several tulip/rose hybrids surviving on the property, and the famed twin sycamores which still exist in front of the homestead. Brockstoce died in 1963, and the estate was sold in 1967, ending the period of Sheraden/Brockstoce residency. The building was nominated in 2017 to become a City Historic Landmark by Preservation Pittsburgh.

== Architecture ==
The Sheraden Homestead was built with Italianate style influences. These influences can be seen with the centered front entrance, the full-width front porch with support posts, the projecting window hoods, and the paired brackets underneath the box gutter. The homestead’s exterior is made of wood clap board which has been painted white. Although other examples of Italianate style architecture are fairly common in Pittsburgh, it is unique because this architectural style is more commonly associated with agrarian settings. One of the most recognizable features which is well known throughout Pittsburgh is the twin sycamore trees that grow together to form an arch over the entrance walkway.

== Gallery ==
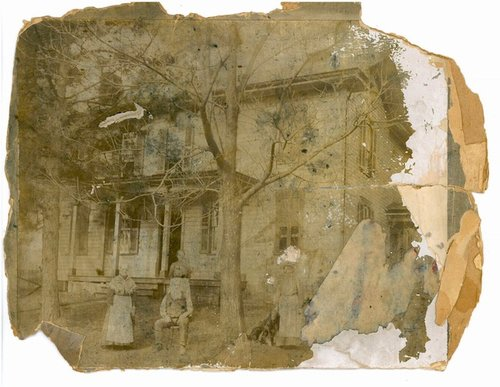
William Sheraden & Family in Front of the Original Farmhouse
