= 1989 All-East football team =

American college football all-star team

The 1989 All-East football team consists of American football players chosen by the Associated Press as the best players at each position among the Eastern colleges and universities during the 1989 NCAA Division I-A football season.

== Offense ==
=== Quarterback ===
- Major Harris, West Virginia (AP-1)
- Alex Van Pelt, Pitt (AP-2)

=== Running backs ===
- Mike Mayweather, Army (AP-1)
- Blair Thomas, Penn State (AP-1)
- Curvin Richards, Pitt (AP-2)
- Michael Owens, Syracuse (AP-2)

=== Wide receivers ===
- Rob Moore, Syracuse (AP-1)
- Reggie Rembert, West Virginia (AP-1)
- Henry Tuten, Pitt (AP-1)
- Mark Chmura, Boston College (AP-2)
- Marcus Cherry, Boston College (AP-2)
- Maurice Johnson, Temple (AP-2)

=== Linemen ===
- Roger Duffy, Penn State (AP-1)
- Dave Szott, Penn State (AP-1)
- Dean Caliguire, Pitt (AP-1)
- Blake Bednarz, Syracuse (AP-1)
- Jack Linn, West Virginia (AP-1)
- John Flannery, Syracuse (AP-2)
- Chris Goetz, Pitt (AP-2)
- Dale Wolfley, West Virginia (AP-2)
- Jack Frey, Army (AP-2)
- Mike Kircher, Navy (AP-2)

=== Placekickers ===
- Doug Giesler, Rutgers (AP-1)
- Ray Tarasi, Penn State (AP-2)

=== Return specialists ===
- Tim Frager, Boston College (AP-1)
- Qadry Ismail, Syracuse (AP-2)

== Defense ==
=== Linemen ===
- Marc Spindler, Pitt (AP-1)
- Keith Hamilton, Pitt (AP-1)
- Rob Burnett, Syracuse (AP-1)
- Mike Fox, West Virginia (AP-1)
- Rich Schonewolf, Penn State (AP-2)
- Will Huff, Army (AP-2)
- Tony Siragusa, Pitt (AP-2)
- Carnel Smith, Pitt (AP-2)

=== Linebackers ===
- Andre Collins, Penn State (AP-1)
- Terry Wooden, Syracuse (AP-1)
- Chris Haering, West Virginia (AP-1)
- David Bavaro, Syracuse (AP-2)
- Renaldo Turnbull, West Virginia (AP-2)
- Brian Chizmar, Penn State (AP-2)

=== Defensive backs ===
- Louis Riddick, Pitt (AP-1)
- Sean Whiteman, Syracuse (AP-1)
- Sherrod Rainge, Penn State (AP-1)
- Preston Waters, West Virginia (AP-1)
- Rico Labbe, Boston College (AP-2)
- Danny Crossman, Pitt (AP-2)
- Darrell Whitmore, West Virginia (AP-2)
- Bob Weissenfels, Navy (AP-2)

=== Punters ===
- Greg Hertzog, West Virginia (AP-1)
- Brian Greenfield, Pitt (AP-2)

== Key ==
- AP = Associated Press

== See also ==
- 1989 College Football All-America Team
