= Campbell Building =

- U.S. National Register of Historic Places
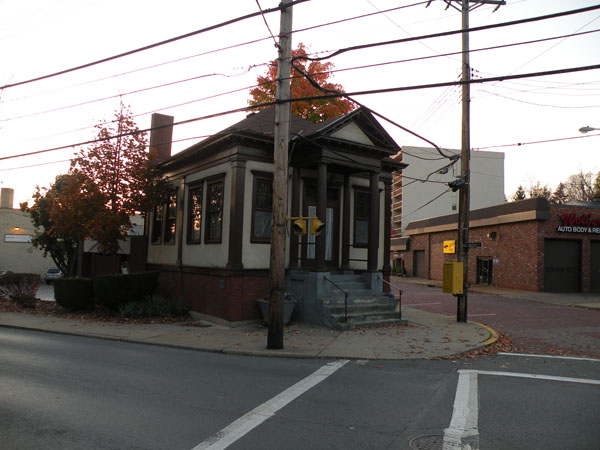

- Location within Pennsylvania Location within the United States
- Location: 3 Crafton Sq., Crafton, Pennsylvania
- Coordinates: 40°26′8″N 80°3′55″W
- Area: 0.3 acres (0.12 ha)
- Built: 1911
- Architectural style: Colonial Revival
- NRHP reference No.: 88001157
- Added to NRHP: September 19, 1988

The Campbell Building is small historic commercial building in Crafton, Pennsylvania. It was built about 1911 and was added to the National Register of Historic Places on September 19, 1988.

Thomas Campbell was an unsuccessful real estate developer who used the building as a sales office from about 1911 to 1915. He may have built it at the current location, which was owned by his major financial backer, Mrs. Adelia Silk, or he had it moved from another location. It is built in the Colonial Revival style, with a hipped roof and a neoclassical entrance porch, which reflect the contemporary styles in both local residential and commercial buildings. Nevertheless, it was designed to be noticeable, and its size, red tile roof and original white stucco walls set the building off from the rest of the buildings in the town's commercial district.

Mrs. Silk died in 1913, and Campbell died in 1915 after selling fewer than 12 building lots. About 1925 the building was raised up on a new brick foundation. It has been used as millinery shop, a furnace display room, a magistrate's office, a craft shop, a lunch counter and a weight-loss clinic. When it was threatened with destruction in the 1980s, local residents fought to preserve the building and list it on the National Register.

== See also ==
- National Register of Historic Places listings in Allegheny County, Pennsylvania
