= Joe Wolf (American football) =

American football player (born 1966)

No. 68
- Positions: Guard, tackle

Personal information
- Born: December 28, 1966 (age 59); Allentown, Pennsylvania, U.S.
- Listed height: 6 ft 6 in (1.98 m)
- Listed weight: 297 lb (135 kg)

Career information
- High school: William Allen (PA) (Allentown, Pennsylvania)
- College: Boston College
- NFL draft: 1989: 1st round, 17th overall pick

Career history
- Phoenix/Arizona Cardinals (1989–1997)

Awards and highlights
- PFWA All-Rookie Team (1989); Second-team All-American (1988); First-team All-East (1988); Second-team All-East (1986)

Career NFL statistics
- Games played: 94
- Games started: 60
- Fumble recoveries: 3
- Stats at Pro Football Reference

Joseph Francis Wolf Jr. (born December 28, 1966) is an American former professional football player who was an offensive lineman for nine seasons with the Phoenix/Arizona Cardinals of the National Football League (NFL).

== Early life and education ==
Wolf was born in Allentown, Pennsylvania, on December 28, 1966. He played high school football for William Allen High School. In 2016, he was inducted into William Allen High School's Hall of Fame. He played college football for the Boston College Eagles.

== Professional career ==
In 1989, Wolf was selected in the first round of the 1989 NFL draft by the Cardinals with the 17th overall pick. He played for the Cardinals from 1989 to 1997.
