= Dean Caliguire =

American football player (born 1967)

No. 64, 61
- Position: Offensive lineman

Personal information
- Born: March 2, 1967 (age 59); Pittsburgh, Pennsylvania, U.S.
- Listed height: 6 ft 2 in (1.88 m)
- Listed weight: 280 lb (127 kg)

Career information
- High school: McKees Rocks (PA) Montour
- College: Pittsburgh
- NFL draft: 1990: 4th round, 92nd overall pick

Career history
- San Francisco 49ers (1990–1991); Pittsburgh Steelers (1991–1992); New England Patriots (1993)*
- * Offseason or practice squad member only

Awards and highlights
- 2× First-team All-East (1987, 1989); Second-team All-East (1988)

Career NFL statistics
- Games played: 9
- Stats at Pro Football Reference

Dean Patrick Caliguire (born March 2, 1967) is an American former professional football player who was an offensive lineman for three seasons in the National Football League (NFL) with the Pittsburgh Steelers and San Francisco 49ers. He was selected by the 49ers in the fourth round of the 1990 NFL draft after playing college football for the Pittsburgh Panthers.

== Early life and college ==
Caliguire attended Montour High School in McKees Rocks, Pennsylvania.

Caliguire attended the University of Pittsburgh and played for the Panthers from 1985 to 1989, earning Associated Press All-East team honors.

== Professional career ==
=== San Francisco 49ers ===
Caliguire was selected by the San Francisco 49ers of the NFL with the 92nd pick in the 1990 NFL Draft and signed with the team on July 29, 1990. He spent the 1990 season on injured reserve. He played in two games for the 49ers in 1991. Caliguire was released by the 49ers on September 28, 1991.

=== Pittsburgh Steelers ===
On October 5, 1991, Caliguire was signed to the practice squad of the Pittsburgh Steelers of the NFL. He was promoted to the active roster on October 18, 1991. He played in seven games for the Steelers during the 1991 season. Caliguire was released by the Steelers on August 31, 1992. He signed with the Steelers on September 15, 1992. He was released by the Steelers on November 3, 1992.

=== New England Patriots ===
Caliguire signed with the NFL's New England Patriots on February 17, 1993. He was released by the Patriots on June 3, 1993.
