= Renaldo Turnbull =

US Virgin Islands gridiron football player (born 1966)

No. 97
- Positions: Defensive end, linebacker

Personal information
- Born: January 5, 1966 (age 60); St. Thomas, U.S. Virgin Islands
- Listed height: 6 ft 5 in (1.96 m)
- Listed weight: 252 lb (114 kg)

Career information
- High school: Charlotte Amalie (VI)
- College: West Virginia
- NFL draft: 1990: 1st round, 14th overall pick

Career history
- New Orleans Saints (1990–1996); Carolina Panthers (1997)

Awards and highlights
- First-team All-Pro (1993); Pro Bowl (1993); PFWA All-Rookie Team (1990); 2× Second-team All-East (1988, 1989)

Career NFL statistics
- Tackles: 245
- Sacks: 45.5
- Forced fumbles: 9
- Fumble recoveries: 7
- Stats at Pro Football Reference

Renaldo Antonio Turnbull (born January 5, 1966) is a former professional American football defensive end and linebacker who played for the New Orleans Saints of the National Football League (NFL). He was the Saints 1st round (14th overall) in the 1990 NFL draft. Turnbull, a 6'5", 252 lb (114 kg) linebacker-defensive end from West Virginia University, played eight seasons in the NFL from 1990 to 1997 for the Saints and Carolina Panthers. In his NFL career, Turnbull played in 120 games with 45.5 sacks and one interception.

== College career ==
In his sophomore season of 1987, Turnbull recorded 13 tackles and a pass break-up.

In 1988, Turnbull teamed up with Chris Haering, Steve Grant, Theron Ellis, and Lonnie Brockman to make up one of the greatest linebacking corps in school history. The team went undefeated, but lost in the Fiesta Bowl to Notre Dame for the national championship. Turnbull, recorded 73 tackles and a career and team-high 12 sacks as switching from linebacker to defensive end positions at times.

In his senior season of 1989, Turnbull recorded 67 tackles, two forced fumbles, eight sacks, and a career-high 11 tackles for a loss.

== Professional career ==
Turnbull was selected in the 1990 NFL draft in the first round, 14th overall by the New Orleans Saints. He is one of only nine West Virginia Mountaineers selected in the first round of the NFL draft. As a rookie in 1990, Turnbull had nine sacks.

In 1993, Turnbull recorded 13.0 sacks and an interception. He was a Pro Bowl selection that season, which was the best in his career.

In his final three seasons as a Saint, Turnbull recorded 6.5, 7, and 6.5 sacks, respectively. In his final NFL season, 1997, Turnbull only recorded one sack while playing for the Carolina Panthers.

== Post-NFL career ==
Since retiring from the NFL Renaldo Turnbull has held jobs as and is currently a coach and professional trainer.
