= Jack Linn =

American football player (1967–2015)

No. 67, 72, 75
- Position: Offensive lineman

Personal information
- Born: June 10, 1967; Sewickley, Pennsylvania, U.S.
- Died: September 6, 2015 (aged 48); Lehigh Acres, Florida, U.S.
- Listed height: 6 ft 5 in (1.96 m)
- Listed weight: 295 lb (134 kg)

Career information
- High school: Freedom PA
- College: West Virginia
- NFL draft: 1990: 9th round, 229th overall pick

Career history

Playing
- Detroit Lions (1990); Miami Dolphins (1991)*; Indianapolis Colts (1991); Detroit Lions (1992–1993); Cincinnati Bengals (1993)
- * Offseason or practice squad member only

Coaching
- Shepherd (1994–1995) Assistant coach; IUP (1996–2001) Offensive line coach

Awards and highlights
- First-team All-East (1989)

Career NFL statistics
- Games played: 11
- Games started: 7
- Stats at Pro Football Reference

Jack Linn (June 10, 1967 – September 6, 2015) was an American professional football player who played offensive lineman for three seasons for the Indianapolis Colts, Detroit Lions, and Cincinnati Bengals. He played in 11 games. He was selected by the Lions in the ninth round of the 1990 NFL draft.

Linn was killed in a motorcycle crash on September 6, 2015. Investigators say Linn missed a stop sign and hit an oncoming vehicle. His passenger was also killed.
