= Butts Wagner =

American baseball player (1871–1928)

- Third baseman
- Born: September 17, 1871; Chartiers, Carnegie, Pennsylvania, U.S.
- Died: November 26, 1928 (aged 57); Pittsburgh, Pennsylvania, U.S.
- Batted: Right Threw: Right

MLB debut
- April 27, 1898, for the Washington Senators

Last MLB appearance
- October 10, 1898, for the Brooklyn Bridegrooms

MLB statistics
- Batting average: .226
- Home runs: 1
- Runs batted in: 34
- Stats at Baseball Reference

Teams
- Washington Senators (1898); Brooklyn Bridegrooms (1898)

Albert Wagner (September 17, 1871 – November 26, 1928), was an American professional baseball player. He played one year of Major League Baseball for two different teams during the 1898 season. He was Honus Wagner's older brother.

== Career ==
Born in Chartiers, Carnegie, Pennsylvania, he began the 1898 season with the Washington Senators and later on was loaned to the Brooklyn Bridegrooms. On July 4, Wagner replaced an injured Duke Farrell in center field and hit a home run, the only home run of his career, along with a double and scored three runs in a 9–5 Bridegroom victory.

Wagner died in Pittsburgh, Pennsylvania, at the age of 57, and is interred at the Chartiers Cemetery in Carnegie, Pennsylvania.

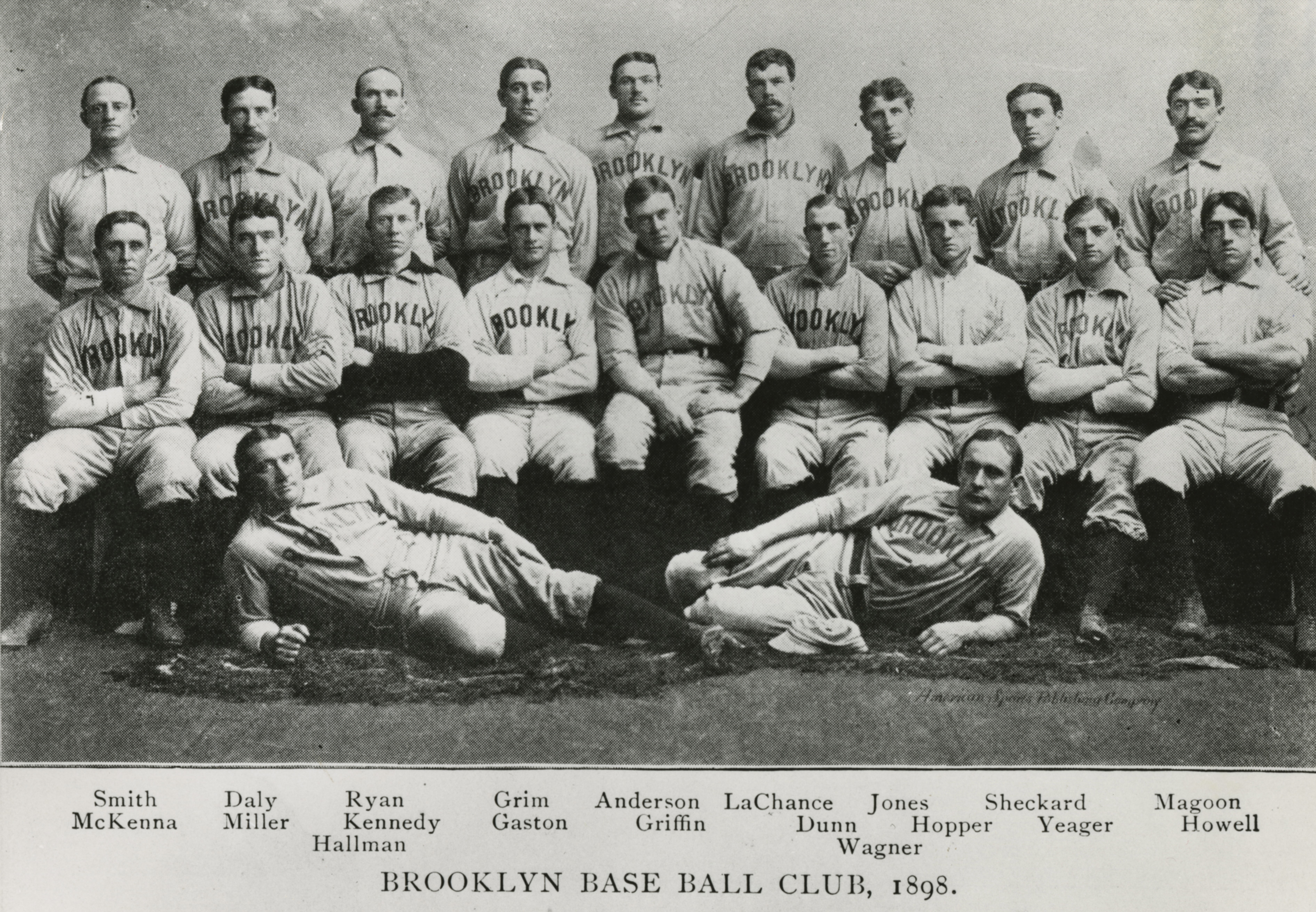
1898 Brooklyn Bridegrooms, Albert “Butts” Wagner included

== Popular culture ==
Butts Wagner is depicted as an eccentric inventor during a boy's long dream sequence in Joseph Romain's book The Mystery of the Wagner Whacker. Wagner invents an automatic bat machine, and the boy helps defend him from organized crime figures who want to steal the invention. In Dan Gutman's book Honus & Me, the main character Joe Stoshack pretends to be Butts to avoid being kicked out of a stadium.
