= Montour School District =

School district in Pennsylvania

Address
- 225 Clever Road McKees Rocks, Allegheny County, Pennsylvania, 15136; United States

District information
- Type: Public
- Grades: K-12
- Superintendent: Dr. Chris Stone

Students and staff
- District mascot: Spartan
- Colors: Black and Gold

Other information
- Website: Montour School District

The Montour School District is a mid-sized, suburban public school district. The district serves Kennedy Township, Robinson Township, Ingram, Thornburg and Pennsbury Village, which are western suburbs of Pittsburgh, Pennsylvania, in the United States. Montour School District encompasses an area of 21.1 square miles (55 km^{2}). The school district had a population of 24,711, according to the 2000 federal census. Special education was provided by the district and the Allegheny Intermediate Unit No. 3. Occupational training and adult education in various vocational and technical fields were provided by the district and the Parkway West Area Vocational-Technical School.

Montour Elementary School and Montour High School share a campus in Robinson Township while David E. Williams Middle School is located in Kennedy Township. The district previous had 3 elementary schools: Forest Grove Elementary (located in Coraopolis), Burkett Elementary (located in Robinson), and Ingram Elementary (located in Ingram). Ingram Elementary closed at the beginning of its 2012-2013 school year due to low test scores and declining enrollment. By 2017, Forest Grove and Burkett closed as well to allow for the elementary consolidation.

== Extracurricular activities ==
The district offers a variety of clubs, activities and sports.

=== Athletics ===
Montour's athletic teams are called the Spartans and the school colors are black and athletic gold. The school has teams for American football, cross country, boys and girls tennis, golf, boys and girls volleyball, and boys and girls soccer, indoor track, swimming, wrestling, boys and girls basketball, bowling, ice hockey, baseball, softball, and track and field.
