= 1988 All-East football team =

American college football all-star team

The 1988 All-East football team consists of American football players chosen by the Associated Press as the best players at each position among the Eastern colleges and universities during the 1988 NCAA Division I-A football season.

== Offense ==
=== Quarterback ===
- Major Harris, West Virginia (AP-1)
- Scott Erney, Rutgers (AP-2)

=== Running backs ===
- Daryl Johnston, Syracuse (AP-1)
- Curvin Richards, Pitt (AP-1)
- A. B. Brown, West Virginia (AP-2)
- Mike Mayweather, Army (AP-2)

=== Tight end ===
- Kevin Voss, Navy (AP-1)
- Pat Davis, Syracuse (AP-2)

=== Wide receivers ===
- Reggie Rembert, West Virginia (AP-1)
- Tom Waddle, Boston College (AP-1)
- Rob Moore, Syracuse (AP-2)
- Eric Young Sr., Rutgers (AP-2)

=== Tackles ===
- Rick Phillips, West Virginia (AP-1)
- Doug Widell, Boston College (AP-1)
- Brian Smider, West Virginia (AP-2)
- Steve Tardy, Rutgers (AP-2)

=== Guards ===
- Mark Stepnoski, Pitt (AP-1)
- Joe Wolf, Boston College (AP-1)
- John Stroia, West Virginia (AP-2)
- Steve Wisniewski, Penn State (AP-2)

=== Center ===
- Kevin Koken, West Virginia (AP-1)
- Dean Caliguire, Pitt (AP-2)

=== Placekicker ===
- Kevin J. Greene, Syracuse (AP-1)
- Brian Lowe, Boston College (AP-2)

== Defense ==
=== Linemen ===
- Rob Burnett, Syracuse (AP-1)
- Burt Grossman, Pitt (AP-1)
- Troy Holland, Navy (AP-1)
- Chris Parker, West Virginia (AP-1)
- George Bankos, Rutgers (AP-2)
- Josh Haines, Army (AP-2)
- Eric Lindstrom, Boston College (AP-2)
- Rich Schonewolf, Penn State (AP-2)

=== Linebackers ===
- Chris Haering, West Virginia (AP-1)
- Jerry Olsavsky, Pitt (AP-1)
- Terry Wooden, Syracuse (AP-1)
- Troy Lingley, Army (AP-2)
- Robert Pickett, West Virginia (AP-2)
- Loranzo Square, Temple (AP-2)
- Renaldo Turnbull, West Virginia (AP-2)

=== Defensive backs ===
- Chris Ingram, Syracuse (AP-1)
- Eddie Johnson, Penn State (AP-1)
- Bo Orlando, West Virginia (AP-1)
- Markus Paul, Syracuse (AP-1)
- Brian Chizmar, Penn State (AP-2)
- Alvoid Mays, West Virginia (AP-2)
- Darrell Whitmore, West Virginia (AP-2)

=== Punter ===
- Matt O'Connell, Rutgers (AP-1)
- Bill Rambusch, Army (AP-2)

== Key ==
- AP = Associated Press

== See also ==
- 1988 College Football All-America Team
