= Chartiers (Pittsburgh) =

Chartiers Chartiers City
- Neighborhood of Pittsburgh
- Coordinates: 40.464°N 80.056°W
- Country: United States
- State: Pennsylvania
- County: Allegheny County
- City: Pittsburgh

Area
  - Total: 0.132 sq mi (0.34 km^{2})

Population (2010)
  - Total: 477
  - Density: 3,610/sq mi (1,400/km^{2})

Chartiers (sometimes called Chartiers City) is a neighborhood in Pittsburgh, Pennsylvania's West End. It has a zip code of 15204, and has representation on Pittsburgh City Council by the council member for District 2 (West Neighborhoods). The neighborhood was named after Peter Chartier, a trapper of French and Native American parentage who established a trading post at the mouth of Chartiers Creek in 1743.

== Surrounding Pittsburgh Neighborhoods ==
Chartiers City borders Esplen to the north, Sheraden to the east and southeast, and Windgap from the south, west and northwest.

== See also ==
- List of Pittsburgh neighborhoods
