= George Leber House =

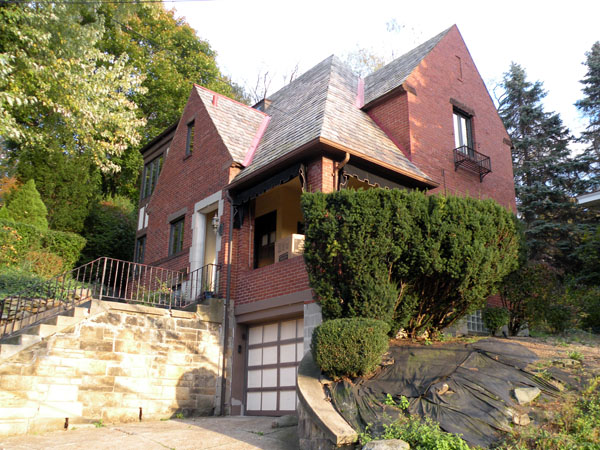

- Location of George Leber House in Allegheny County, Pennsylvania
- 40°26′11.45″N 80°3′41.25″W
- Location: 132 East Crafton Avenue, Crafton, Pennsylvania, U.S.

History
- Built: 1938

Site notes
- Architect: George M. Rowland

Pittsburgh Landmark – PHLF
- Designated: 2003

George Leber House, located at 132 East Crafton Avenue in Crafton, Pennsylvania, was built in 1938. This Tudor Revival style house was added to the List of Pittsburgh History and Landmarks Foundation Historic Landmarks in 2003.
