= Roger Duffy (American football) =

American football player (born 1967)

No. 62
- Positions: Center, guard

Personal information
- Born: July 16, 1967 (age 59); Pittsburgh, Pennsylvania, U.S.
- Listed height: 6 ft 2 in (1.88 m)
- Listed weight: 298 lb (135 kg)

Career information
- High school: Canton (OH) Central Catholic
- College: Penn State
- NFL draft: 1990: 8th round, 197th overall pick

Career history
- New York Jets (1990–1997); Pittsburgh Steelers (1998–2001)

Awards and highlights
- National champion (1986); First-team All-East (1989)

Career NFL statistics
- Games played: 176
- Games started: 92
- Fumble recoveries: 6
- Stats at Pro Football Reference

Roger Thomas Duffy (born July 16, 1967) is an American former professional football player who was a center and guard in the National Football League (NFL). He played college football for the Penn State Nittany Lions and was selected by the Jets in the eighth round of the 1990 NFL draft. He played for the New York Jets from 1990 to 1997 and for the Pittsburgh Steelers from 1998 to 2001.
