= Thornburg Historic District =

Historic district in Pennsylvania, United States

- U.S. National Register of Historic Places
- U.S. Historic district
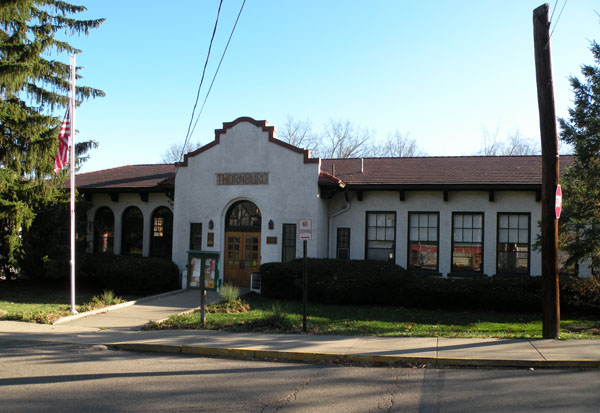
- Thornburg School

- Location within Pennsylvania Location within the United States
- Location: Off Pennsylvania Route 60, Thornburg, Pennsylvania
- Coordinates: 40°25′56.97″N 80°4′59.76″W
- Built: circa 1820 to 1840
- Architectural style: Bungalow/Craftsman, Queen Anne
- NRHP reference No.: 82001529
- Added to NRHP: December 8, 1982

The Thornburg Historic District is a historic district that is located in Thornburg, Pennsylvania. The district was listed on the National Register of Historic Places on December 8, 1982.

== History and architectural features ==
Planned as a suburban development during the early twentieth century, this district encompasses seventy-five contributing buildings; all but one are residential. Situated within four miles from downtown Pittsburgh, the district remains intact as an example of early suburban development.

The majority of houses were built in the Bungalow or Shingle styles, with others in the Queen Anne, Craftsman, Colonial, Mission or Tudor styles. Cousins Frank and David Thornburg developed the approximately 250 acres, starting circa 1900.

The Thornburg School was built in 1910 to the design of Press C. Dowler in the Mission Revival architecture style. It was used as a school until 1971 and is now a community center.

The district was listed on the National Register of Historic Places on December 8, 1982.
