= Windgap (Pittsburgh) =

Coordinates: 40.45455°N 80.07444°W

- Neighborhood of Pittsburgh
- Country: United States
- State: Pennsylvania
- County: Allegheny County
- City: Pittsburgh

Area
  - Total: 0.415 sq mi (1.07 km^{2})

Population (2010)
  - Total: 1,369
  - Density: 3,300/sq mi (1,270/km^{2})

Windgap is a neighborhood in the West End of Pittsburgh, Pennsylvania, United States. It has a zip code of 15204, and has representation on Pittsburgh City Council by the council member for District 2 (West Neighborhoods).

== Surrounding and adjacent neighborhoods ==
Windgap has six land borders with the Pittsburgh neighborhoods of Esplen to the northeast, Chartiers City to the east, Sheraden and Crafton Heights to the southeast, the borough of Ingram to the south and the Pittsburgh neighborhood of Fairywood from the south to the west. Across Chartiers Creek, Windgap runs adjacent with McKees Rocks to the north (with a direct connector via Windgap Bridge) and Kennedy Township to the northwest.

== See also ==
List of Pittsburgh neighborhoods
