= Robinson Town Centre =

- Location: Robinson Township, Allegheny County, Pennsylvania, United States
- Coordinates: 40.4541°N 80.1651°W
- Opened: 1988
- Developer: Zamagias Properties, Edward J. DeBartolo Corporation, Forest City Enterprises
- Manager: Forest City Enterprises
- Owner: Forest City Enterprises
- Num. of stores: over 60
- Floors: 1
- Public transit: Port Authority bus: 24, 28X, 29
- Website: www.robinsontowncentre.com

Robinson Town Centre is an expansive, open-air power center located near The Mall at Robinson in Robinson Township, Pennsylvania. Announced on June 28, 1987, and completed in 1988, it is situated nearly 15 minutes from downtown Pittsburgh along Interstate 376 (Parkway West) and Route 60. Robinson Town Centre spurred development of the shopping districts in the western hills of Allegheny County. The mall and town center serve as the main shopping district for residents of Pittsburgh's Airport Area.

Both The Mall at Robinson and Robinson Town Centre are owned by Forest City Enterprises of Cleveland, Ohio. Other developments include The Pointe at North Fayette, Robinson Crossroads, Robinson Court, and Settlers Ridge.

The first tenants at Robinson Town Centre included a Hills Department Store, Children's Palace toy store, a Dahlkemper's catalog showroom, Sears appliances, Phar-Mor drug and discount store, Pappan's Family Restaurant, Sun TV, Joann Fabrics and OfficeMax, among other small retail stores. Marshalls and TJ Maxx are among the original tenants that still exist at the centre.

This development also made way for the first IKEA store within a six-hour distance.

Other tenants today include Ichiban Hibachi, HomeGoods, Kirkland's, and Famous Footwear.

== History ==
In the fall of 1960, Acme stores purchased 100 acres from the Scott family farm for the site's original development.

On April 28, 2000, racially motivated spree killer Richard Baumhammers killed two Asian-American restaurant workers at the Ya Fei Chinese Cuisine in Robinson Towne Centre during a shooting spree that left five individuals dead and one paralyzed.

== See also ==
- The Mall at Robinson
