= Creighton Avenue =

U.S historic landmark

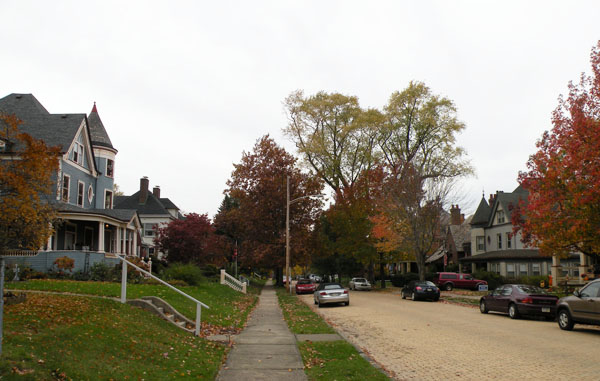

- Location of Creighton Avenue in Allegheny County, Pennsylvania
- 40°25′53.56″N 80°3′57.8″W
- Location: Creighton Avenue in Crafton, Pennsylvania, USA

History
- Built: 1895

Pittsburgh Landmark – PHLF
- Designated: 1990

Creighton Avenue in Crafton, Pennsylvania, was platted in 1895. The avenue contains many houses that were built in the late 1800s and early 1900s. It was added to the List of Pittsburgh History and Landmarks Foundation Historic Landmarks in 1990.
