= Carnegie, Pennsylvania =

Borough in Pennsylvania, US

- Borough
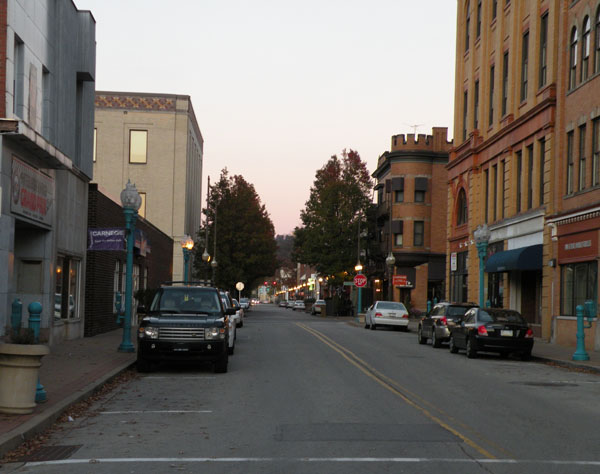
- East Main Street in 2009
- Etymology: Andrew Carnegie
- Location in Allegheny County and the U.S. state of Pennsylvania.
- Coordinates: 40°24′25″N 80°05′12″W
- Country: United States
- State: Pennsylvania
- County: Allegheny
- Incorporated: March 1, 1894

Area
  - Total: 1.62 sq mi (4.20 km^{2})
  - Land: 1.62 sq mi (4.20 km^{2})
  - Water: 0 sq mi (0.00 km^{2})
- Elevation: 833 ft (254 m)

Population (2020)
  - Total: 8,134
  - Density: 5,019.4/sq mi (1,937.99/km^{2})
- Time zone: UTC-5 (EST)
  - Summer (DST): UTC-4 (EDT)
- ZIP code: 15106
- Area code: 412
- FIPS code: 42-11336
- School District: Carlynton
- Website: www.carnegieborough.com

Carnegie (/kɑːrˈneɪɡi/ kar-NAY-ghee) is a borough in Allegheny County, Pennsylvania, United States. The population was 8,134 in the 2020 census. It is part of the Pittsburgh metropolitan area.

== History ==
Carnegie is named after Andrew Carnegie, who donated one of his libraries for the gesture. It was incorporated on March 1, 1894, from the boroughs of Chartiers and Mansfield (separated by Chartiers Creek). Later, the borough annexed part of Robinson Township (now Rosslyn Heights).

On August 25, 1923, an estimated 10,000–30,000 members of the Ku Klux Klan (from surrounding areas) marched there to celebrate a so-called "Karnegie Day" and target the heavily-Catholic town's residents. The march was resisted by local residents, resulting in a riot which left injuries on both sides and the death of a Klansman.

In 2004, Carnegie was significantly damaged by flooding as a result of Hurricane Ivan. Much of the commercial section of the borough, as well as the borough's Roman Catholic churches, was closed or damaged. But since 2014, Carnegie's Main Street has rebounded with many new restaurants and small businesses.

== Geography ==
Carnegie is located at 40°24′25″N 80°5′12″W. It is approximately 5 miles (8 km) southwest of Pittsburgh. Chartiers Creek runs through the center of the borough and one tributary, Campbells Run, joins Chartiers Creek here.

According to the United States Census Bureau, the borough has a total area of 1.6 square miles (4.1 km^{2}), all land. Its average elevation is 833 ft (254 m) above sea level.

=== Surrounding communities ===
Carnegie is bordered by Rosslyn Farms to the north, Scott Township to the east, south and southwest, Collier Township to the west, and Robinson Township to the northwest.

== Demographics ==
Historical population
Census	Pop.	Note	%±
1900	7,330		—
1910	10,009		36.5%
1920	11,516		15.1%
1930	12,497		8.5%
1940	12,663		1.3%
1950	12,105		−4.4%
1960	11,887		−1.8%
1970	10,864		−8.6%
1980	10,099		−7.0%
1990	9,278		−8.1%
2000	8,389		−9.6%
2010	7,972		−5.0%
2020	8,134		2.0%

As of the census of 2000, there were 8,389 people, 3,967 households, and 2,134 families residing in the borough. The population density was 5,076.7 inhabitants per square mile (1,960.1/km^{2}). There were 4,249 housing units at an average density of 2,571.3 per square mile (992.8/km^{2}). The racial makeup of the borough was 91.32% White, 5.57% African American, 0.08% Native American, 1.23% Asian, 0.05% Pacific Islander, 0.39% from other races, and 1.36% from two or more races. Hispanic or Latino of any race were 0.99% of the population.

Out of the 3,967 households, 22.7% had children under the age of 18 living with them, 37.4% were married couples living together, 13.2% had a female householder with no husband present, and 46.2% were non-families. 40.4% of all households were made up of individuals, and 18.3% had someone living alone who was 65 years of age or older. The average household size was 2.10 and the average family size was 2.86.

In the borough, 19.4% of the population was under the age of 18, 8.1% between 18 to 24, 30.4% from 25 to 44, 22.0% from 45 to 64, and 20.1% who were 65 years of age or older. The median age was 40 years. For every 100 females, there were 85.0 males. For every 100 females age 18 and over, there were 81.0 males.

The median income for a household in the borough was $32,589, and the median income for a family was $41,371. Males had a median income of $30,792 versus $26,239 for females. The per capita income for the borough was $21,119. About 9.7% of families and 11.5% of the population were below the poverty line, including 19.4% of those under age 18 and 7.2% of those age 65 or over.

== Culture ==
Carnegie is a walkable community with many stores and restaurants on its Main Street. Its park is home to a dog off-leash area, playground, tennis courts, a hockey rink, basketball courts, baseball fields, walking trails, and Pitcher Skate Park. The Andrew Carnegie Free Library & Music Hall is home to the Grand Army of the Republic Cpt. Thomas Espy Post and Stage 62 theater productions. The Off the Wall Productions theater also has its home in Carnegie, and hosts the annual Pittsburgh New Works Festival.

Carnegie is religiously diverse. There are two Orthodox Churches (Ukrainian and Russian), two Lutheran churches, a Ukrainian Catholic church, a Methodist church, an Episcopal church, a Polish Catholic church, a Roman Catholic Church (formerly 4), and a synagogue. In addition, the Attawheed Islamic Center opened in 2011, and the Indian Community Center in 2012.

Carnegie also has many local fraternal organizations including the VFW, FOE, American Legion, Elks, Polish Eagles, Polish Sportsmen, AOH, Ukrainian-American Citizens' Club, plus a number of smaller clubs.

== Government and politics ==
Presidential Elections Results
Year	Republican	Democratic	Third Parties
2020	39% 1,688	58% 2,512	1% 65
2016	43% 1,574	53% 1,944	4% 136
2012	42% 1,465	56% 1,945	2% 54

== Education ==
Carnegie's students are served by the Carlynton School District. There is an elementary school within the borough.

Clark High School, which became Scott Township High School, was in Carnegie. It became John Dewey Junior High School in the early 1960s.

== Notable people ==
=== Athletes ===
- Mike Ditka, Pro Football Hall of Fame member
- Bernie Faloney, Canadian Football Hall of Fame member
- Patsy Flaherty, Major League Baseball player, friend and teammate of Honus Wagner
- Skip Prosser, Former NCAA Division I basketball head coach for Wake Forest University
- Butts Wagner, Major League Baseball player, older brother of Honus Wagner
- Honus Wagner, Baseball Hall of Fame member

=== Politicians ===
- Ruggero J. Aldisert, judge on the United States Court of Appeals
- James H. Duff, governor of Pennsylvania, 1947–1951; member of the U.S. Senate, 1951–1957
- James A. Wright, member of the U.S. House of Representatives, 1941–1945

=== Artists ===
- James Michael Newell, W.P.A. muralist
- Brian Alfred, Painter, Animator and Podcast Host

== See also ==
- Polish Cathedral style
- Polish American

== Gallery ==
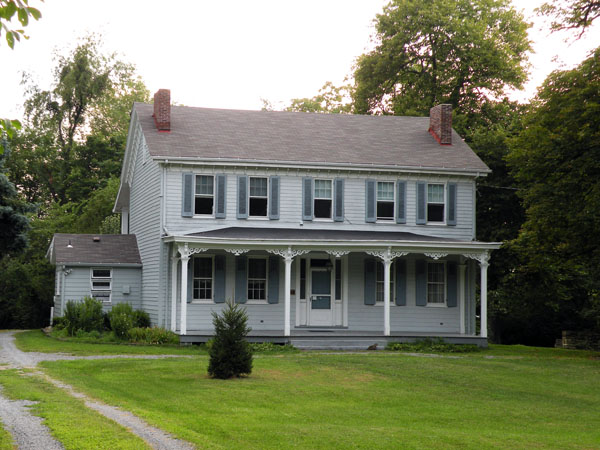
Forsythe Home, built around 1850, located at 920 Forsythe Road.

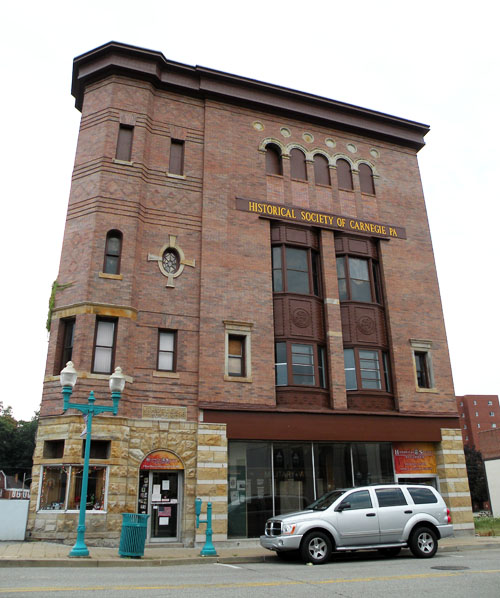
Husler Building, built in 1896, located at 1 West Main Street.

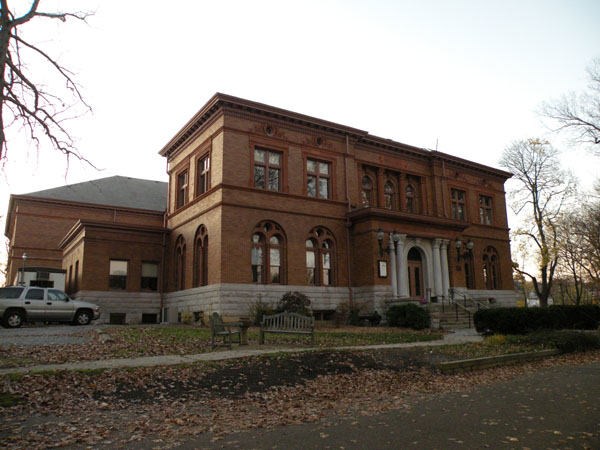
The Andrew Carnegie Free Library, built in 1899, located at 300 Beechwood Avenue.

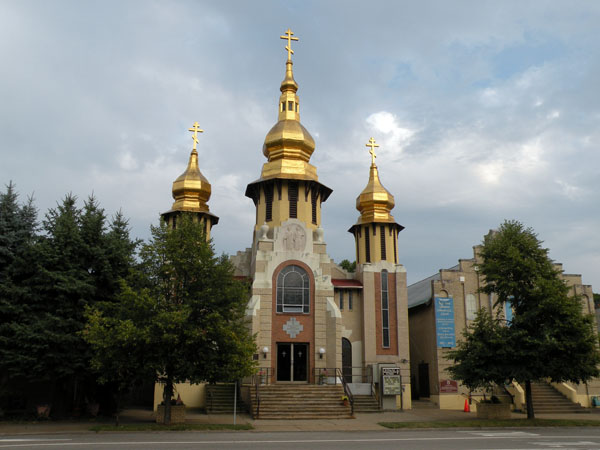
St. Peter & St. Paul Ukrainian Orthodox Church, built in 1906, located at 220 Mansfield Boulevard.

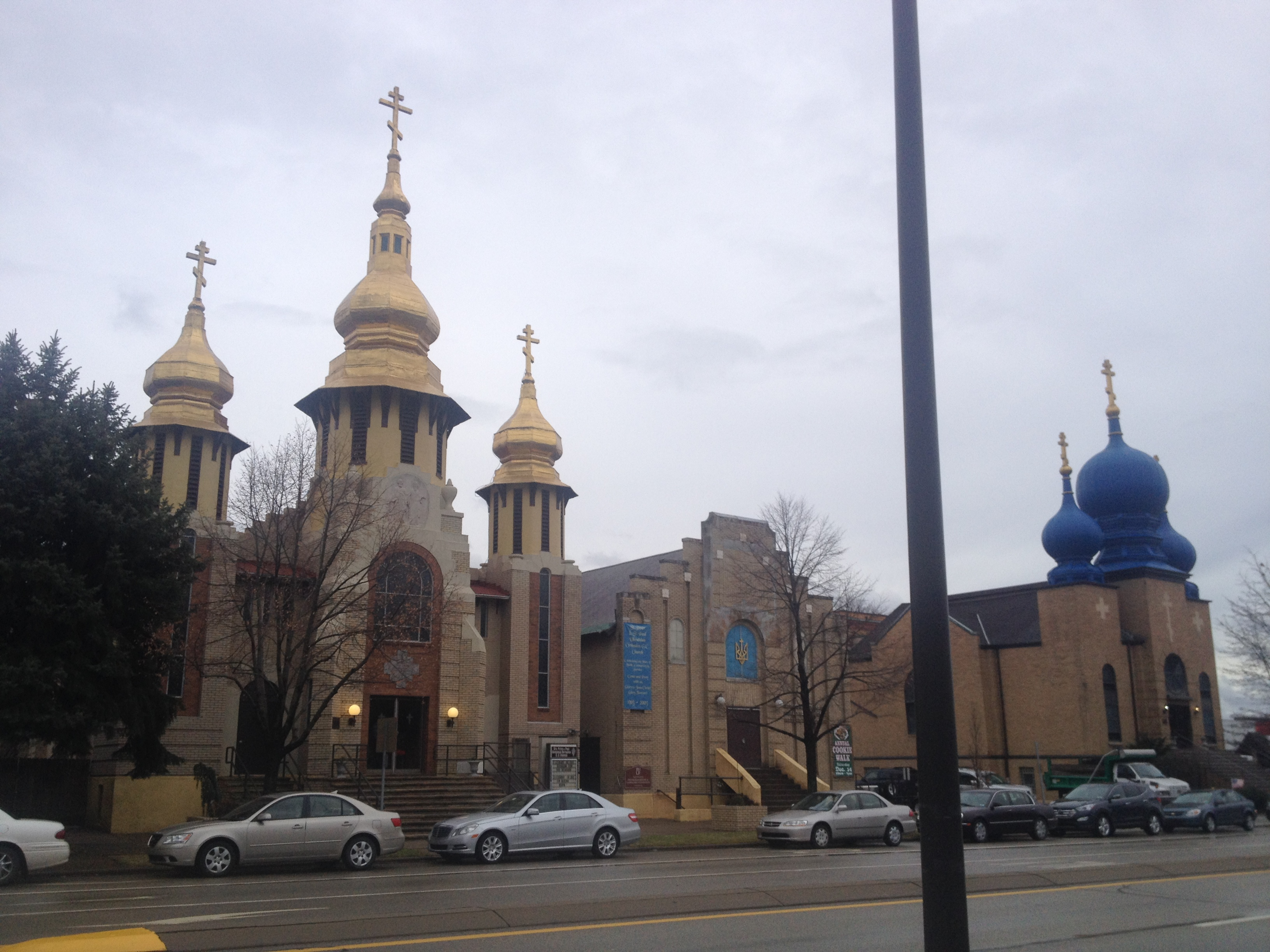
St. Peter & St. Paul Ukrainian Orthodox Church and The Holy Virgin Russian Orthodox Church in Carnegie, PA.

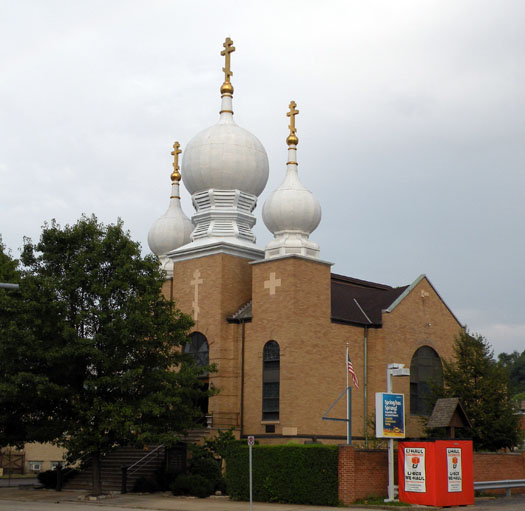
The Holy Virgin Russian Orthodox Church, built in 1920, located at 214 Mansfield Boulevard.

Preceded by Rosslyn Farms	Bordering communities of Pittsburgh	Succeeded by Green Tree
