= Settlers Ridge =

- Location: Robinson Township, Allegheny County, Pennsylvania, United States
- Coordinates: 40.43876°N 80.14543°W
- Opened: 2009
- Developer: CBL & Associates Properties, Inc. and Faison Enterprises, Inc.
- Manager: Wilder Companies
- Owner: Inland Real Estate Income Trust Inc.
- Num. of stores: 50+
- Num. of anchor tenants: 5
- Floor area: 600,000 square feet (56,000 m^{2})
- Floors: 1 (some anchors feature 2 levels)
- Parking: 2,940 spaces
- Website: settlersridgepa.com

Settlers Ridge is an open-air lifestyle center in Robinson Township, Allegheny County, Pennsylvania about halfway between Penn Center West and the Robinson Town Centre. The $100 million shopping complex opened for business on October 30, 2009, with phase two of the development currently under construction as of Spring 2011. It is owned by O'Connor/Real Vest Retail Holding Co. LLC of New York, with Boston-based Wilder Companies handling management and leasing at the shopping center.

== Planning and development ==
In 2006, following the completion of the Ridge Road interchange off of the Parkway West (U.S. Route 22/30), developers CBL & Associates Properties, Inc. and Faison Enterprises, Inc., purchased about 79 acres (320,000 m^{2}) nearby from Robinson Park Associates to develop a new lifestyle center, which was to be called Settlers Ridge.

The plans were put before the local planning commission in the fall of 2006, and approved by the Robinson commissioners in November 2006. An amended plan for the development was approved by the town commissioners in October 2007, and work began on the site soon after with construction on buildings beginning in the summer of 2008. In late 2010, CBL sold the first phase of the Settlers Ridge shopping complex to O'Connor/Real Vest Retail Holding Co. LLC of New York for $132.9 million, with an option to purchase the phase two addition from CBL at a later date. Boston-based Wilder Companies currently manages and leases the complex.

== Anchors ==
- Barnes & Noble – 30,000 square feet (2,800 m^{2})
- Cinemark Theatres – 53,400 square feet (4,960 m^{2})
- Giant Eagle Market District – 150,000 square feet (14,000 m^{2})
- LA Fitness – 38,000 square feet (3,500 m^{2})
