= Esplen (Pittsburgh) =

- Neighborhood of Pittsburgh
- Coordinates: 40.463°N 80.054°W
- Country: United States
- State: Pennsylvania
- County: Allegheny County
- City: Pittsburgh

Area
  - Total: 0.23 sq mi (0.60 km^{2})

Population (2020)
  - Total: 322
  - Density: 1,400/sq mi (540/km^{2})

Esplen is a neighborhood in the West End of Pittsburgh, Pennsylvania, United States. It has a zip code of 15204, and has representation on Pittsburgh City Council by the council member for District 2 (West Neighborhoods).

The area bears the name of John Esplen, an early settler. Esplen started out as a railroad camp, which housed workers building the various railroads which border Esplen.

Esplen is bordered by the Ohio River to the northeast and southeast, Chartiers Creek, which feeds into the Ohio at Esplen, and McKees Rocks via bridge over the creek to the north, Windgap to the northwest, Chartiers City to the south and southwest, Sheraden to the south, and Elliott to the southeast.

Major intersecting streets in Esplen are Tabor, which cuts Esplen in half as well as providing access to Sheraden via the Radcliffe St. Bridge, and West Carson Street which borders all of the northern portion of Esplen, between Esplen and the old P&LE Railroad right of way (now CSX) and the Ohio River.

Esplen is part of Pittsburgh and is in the Pittsburgh City School district.

Esplen is approximately 7 minutes from Downtown Pittsburgh via Pittsburgh Regional Transit bus service.

== Education ==
Pittsburgh Public Schools operates public schools. Stevens Elementary School previously served Esplen.

== See also ==
- List of Pittsburgh neighborhoods
