= Thornburg, Pennsylvania =

Borough in Pennsylvania, US

- Borough
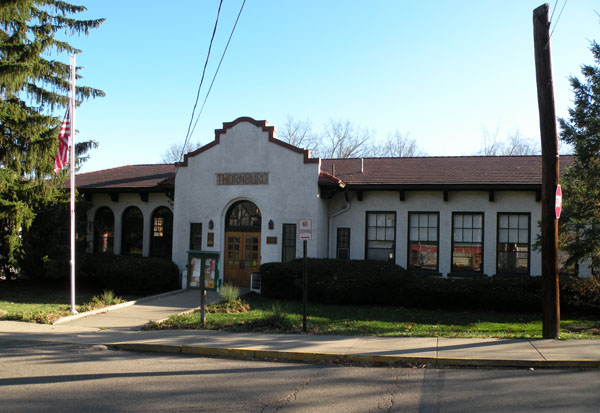
- Community center

- Location in Allegheny County and the U.S. state of Pennsylvania.
- Coordinates: 40.433568°N 80.083165°W
- Country: United States
- State: Pennsylvania
- County: Allegheny

Government
  - Mayor: Thomas Mackin (D)

Area
  - Total: 0.44 sq mi (1.13 km^{2})
  - Land: 0.44 sq mi (1.13 km^{2})
  - Water: 0 sq mi (0.00 km^{2})

Population (2020)
  - Total: 466
  - Density: 1,064.9/sq mi (411.17/km^{2})
- Time zone: UTC-5 (Eastern (EST))
  - Summer (DST): UTC-4 (EDT)
- ZIP code: 15205
- FIPS code: 42-76560
- Website: thornburgborough.org

Thornburg is a borough in Allegheny County in the U.S. state of Pennsylvania. The population was 466 at the 2020 census.

== Geography ==
Thornburg is located at 40°26′01″N 80°04′59″W (40.433568, −80.083165). According to the United States Census Bureau, the borough has a total area of 0.4 square miles (1.0 km^{2}), all land.

== Education ==
Thornburg is served by the Montour School District.

== Government and politics ==
Presidential election results
Year	Republican	Democratic	Third parties
2020	37% 135	62% 224	0.5% 2
2016	49% 156	51% 162	1% 1
2012	59% 193	40% 130	1% 3

== Demographics ==
Historical population
Census	Pop.	Note	%±
1910	230		—
1920	300		30.4%
1930	327		9.0%
1940	284		−13.1%
1950	335		18.0%
1960	391		16.7%
1970	617		57.8%
1980	526		−14.7%
1990	461		−12.4%
2000	468		1.5%
2010	455		−2.8%
2020	466		2.4%
U.S. Decennial Census

At the 2000 census, there were 468 people, 177 households, and 138 families living in the borough. The population density was 1,060.8 inhabitants per square mile (409.6/km^{2}). There were 182 housing units at an average density of 412.5 per square mile (159.3/km^{2}). The racial makeup of the borough was 96.79% White, 0.85% Asian, 0.21% from other races, and 2.14% from two or more races. Hispanic or Latino of any race were 1.50%.

There were 177 households, 33.9% had children under the age of 18 living with them, 69.5% were married couples living together, 6.8% had a female householder with no husband present, and 22.0% were non-families. 16.9% of households were made up of individuals, and 7.9% were one person aged 65 or older. The average household size was 2.64 and the average family size was 3.01.

The age distribution was 27.1% under the age of 18, 3.2% from 18 to 24, 21.6% from 25 to 44, 33.5% from 45 to 64, and 14.5% 65 or older. The median age was 44 years. For every 100 females there were 95.0 males. For every 100 females age 18 and over, there were 94.9 males.

The median household income was $83,264 and the median family income was $84,114. Males had a median income of $80,000 versus $39,063 for females. The per capita income for the borough was $57,674. None of the families and 1.3% of the population were living below the poverty line, including no under eighteens and none of those over 64.

== Surrounding and adjacent neighborhoods ==
Thornburg has borders with Robinson Township to the north and west and Rosslyn Farms to the southwest. Across Chartiers Creek to the south and east, Thornburg runs adjacent with Crafton.

== See also ==
- Thornburg Historic District

Preceded by Moon Run	Bordering communities of Pittsburgh	Succeeded by Ingram
