= Sheraden =

- Neighborhood of Pittsburgh
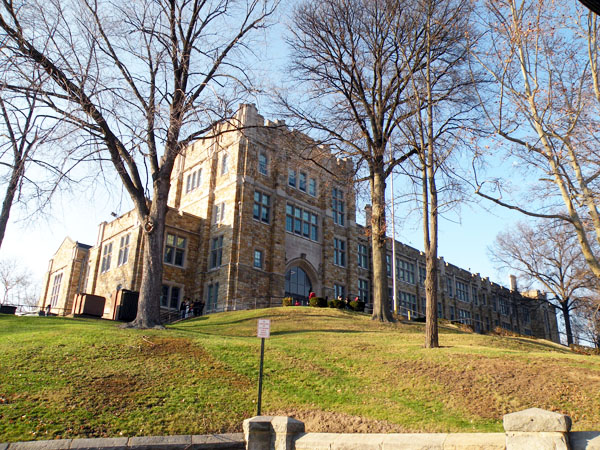
- Langley High School

- Coordinates: 40.456°N 80.058°W
- Country: United States
- State: Pennsylvania
- County: Allegheny County
- City: Pittsburgh

Area
  - Total: 0.69 sq mi (1.8 km^{2})

Population (2010)
  - Total: 5,299
  - Density: 7,700/sq mi (3,000/km^{2})

Sheraden is a neighborhood that is located in the West End of Pittsburgh, Pennsylvania, United States. Nearby neighborhoods include Windgap, Chartiers City, Crafton Heights, Esplen, and Elliott.

== History ==
This neighborhood was named for William Sheraden, a settler who gave land for the construction of a railroad depot in exchange for the naming rights. Sheraden's original homestead still stands at 2803 Bergman Street, easily distinguished by the two sycamore trees which grew together to form an arch, a legacy of Sheraden's horticulturalist grandson.

The area was selling lots in 1889. For instance in May 1889, there were trains transporting potential buyers to Sheraden. On May 14, 1889, for instance, 200 people came to look at potential lots, and 24 lots were sold.

Originally incorporated as Sheraden Borough in 1894, this town grew quickly and was annexed by the city of Pittsburgh in 1907. Shortly thereafter, the Pittsburgh school board opened multiple educational facilities around Sheraden, including Langley High School, which was completed in 1923 and replaced the former borough's Riverview High School.

Sheraden grew to become a hub for Irish and German immigrants to Pittsburgh; however, in the 1970s when suburbia increased in popularity, the Irish and Germans moved from Sheraden into Robinson and Crafton. Most of the Irish schoolchildren went to Holy Innocents grade school, which is currently closed along with its parish. Holy Innocents also had a high school.

== Town Events and Festivals ==
In May1902, the Womens Industrial Society in connection with the Episcopal Church held a loan art exhibit at the residence of Ms. Jennie Morgan in Zephyr Avenue.

== Education ==
Pittsburgh Public Schools operates public schools. Stevens Elementary School previously served Sheraden.

== Recreation ==
McGonigle Park
This park, located at the end of Allendale Street, features a baseball diamond, batting cage, basketball court, playground, and swing set. Behind the baseball field is a hill that connects to the Chartiers City neighborhood (with beautiful views of the Chartiers Creek).

Mutual Parklet
This small parklet, located on Mutual Street, hosts a basketball hoop, playground, and swing set.

Sheraden Park
Sheraden Park includes a swimming pool, tennis courts, ballfields, outdoor basketball courts and picnic and playground areas.

Sheraden Skate Park
This park, located off of Tuxedo Street, features structures for individuals to use skateboards on.

== See also ==
- List of Pittsburgh neighborhoods
