= Rosslyn Farms, Pennsylvania =

Borough in Pennsylvania, US

- Borough
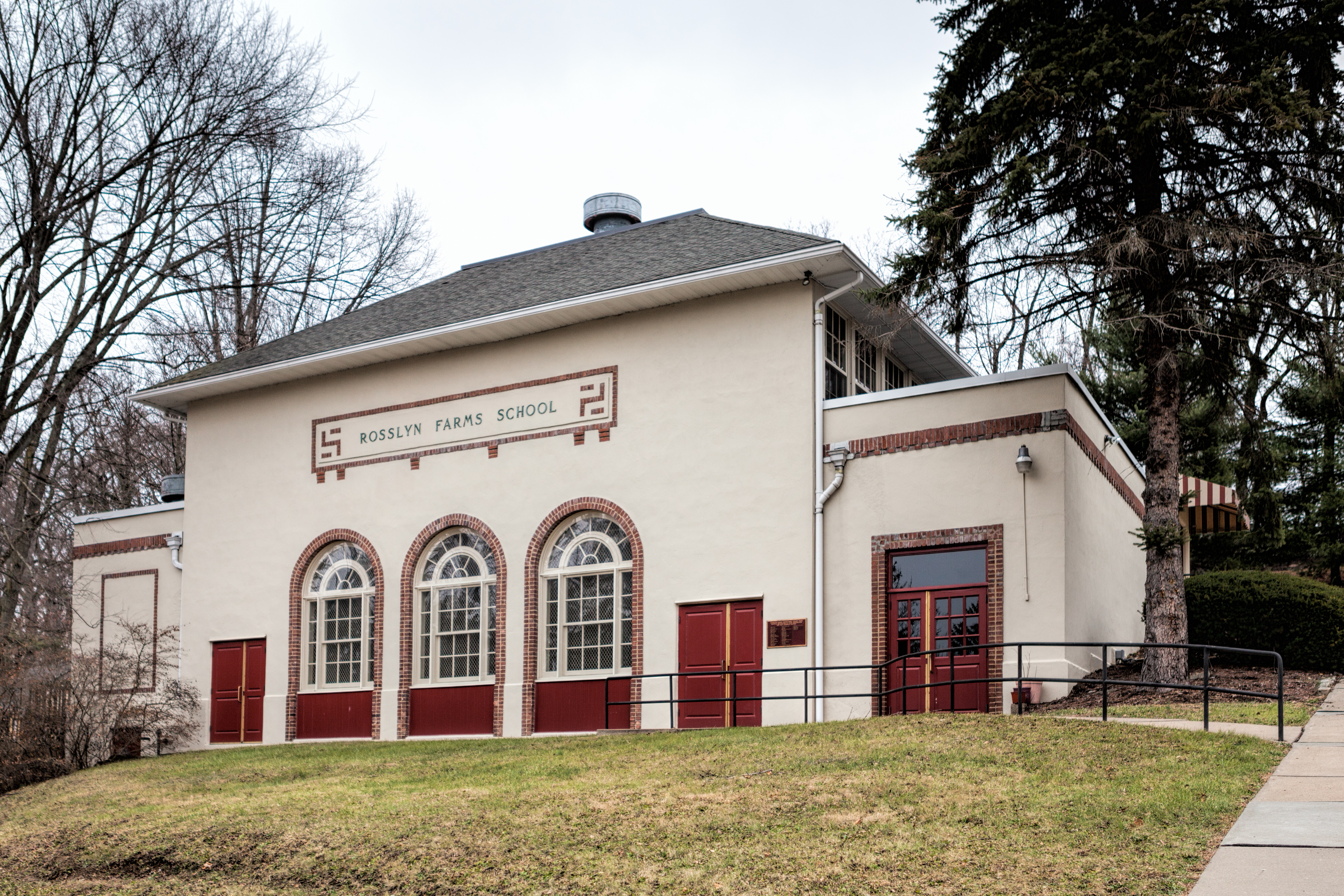
- The former Rosslyn Farms School, now the Rosslyn Farms Community Center, located in the borough at the intersection of Kings Hwy and Priscilla Ln

- Location in Allegheny County and the U.S. state of Pennsylvania.
- Coordinates: 40°25′15″N 80°5′20″W
- Country: United States
- State: Pennsylvania
- County: Allegheny

Area
  - Total: 0.56 sq mi (1.44 km^{2})
  - Land: 0.56 sq mi (1.44 km^{2})
  - Water: 0 sq mi (0.00 km^{2})

Population (2020)
  - Total: 441
  - Density: 793.9/sq mi (306.53/km^{2})
- Time zone: UTC-5 (Eastern (EST))
  - Summer (DST): UTC-4 (EDT)
- FIPS code: 42-66320
- Website: rosslynfarmspa.gov

Rosslyn Farms is a suburban borough located 5 miles (8 km) west of Pittsburgh in Allegheny County, Pennsylvania, United States. It is a small community, with an area of only 0.6 square miles (1.6 km^{2}). The population was 441 at the 2020 census.

== Surrounding and adjacent communities ==
Rosslyn Farms is bordered by Carnegie to the south, Robinson Township to the west, and Thornburg to the north. Chartiers Creek separates Rosslyn Farms from Crafton to the east, the Pittsburgh neighborhood of East Carnegie to the southeast, and Scott Township also to the southeast.

== Geography ==
Rosslyn Farms is located at 40°25'15" North, 80°5'20" West (40.420969, −80.088768).

According to the United States Census Bureau, the borough has a total area of 0.6 square miles (1.6 km^{2}), all land.

== Demographics ==
Historical population
Census	Pop.	Note	%±
1920	315		—
1930	334		6.0%
1940	432		29.3%
1950	448		3.7%
1960	555		23.9%
1970	608		9.5%
1980	521		−14.3%
1990	483		−7.3%
2000	464		−3.9%
2010	427		−8.0%
2020	441		3.3%
U.S. Decennial Census

As of the 2000 census, there were 464 people, 185 households, and 145 families residing in the borough. The population density was 767.6 inhabitants per square mile (296.4/km^{2}). There were 193 housing units at an average density of 319.3 per square mile (123.3/km^{2}). The racial makeup of the borough was 99.14% White, 0.65% African American, 0.00% Native American, 0.00% Asian, 0.00% Pacific Islander, 0.00% from other races, and 0.22% from two or more races. 0.43% of the population were Hispanic or Latino of any race.

There were 185 households, out of which 30.3% had children under the age of 18 living with them, 71.4% were married couples living together, 3.8% had a female householder with no husband present, and 21.6% were non-families. 16.8% of all households were made up of individuals, and 5.9% had someone living alone who was 65 years of age or older. The average household size was 2.51 and the average family size was 2.84.

In the borough the population was spread out, with 23.9% under the age of 18, 3.0% from 18 to 24, 26.9% from 25 to 44, 31.9% from 45 to 64, and 14.2% who were 65 years of age or older. The median age was 44 years. For every 100 females, there were 99.1 males. For every 100 females age 18 and over, there were 91.8 males.

The median income for a household in the borough was $100,125, and the median income for a family was $145,799. Males had a median income of $105,327 versus $73,083 for females. The per capita income for the borough was $71,612. 5.8% of the population and 2.6% of families were below the poverty line. Out of the total population, 16.3% of those under the age of 18 and 0.0% of those 65 and older were living below the poverty line.

== History ==
Founded in 1902 by the Chartiers Land Company, Rosslyn Farms was developed by William Parrish.

The borough derives its name from Roslin, Scotland.

== Government and politics ==
Presidential election results
Year	Republican	Democratic	Third parties
2020	47% 169	50% 180	1% 5
2016	46% 138	53% 159	1% 2
2012	55% 180	44% 144	1% 3

Preceded by Crafton	Bordering communities of Pittsburgh	Succeeded by Carnegie
