= Robinson Township, Allegheny County, Pennsylvania =

Township in Pennsylvania, US

Robinson Township, Pennsylvania
- Township
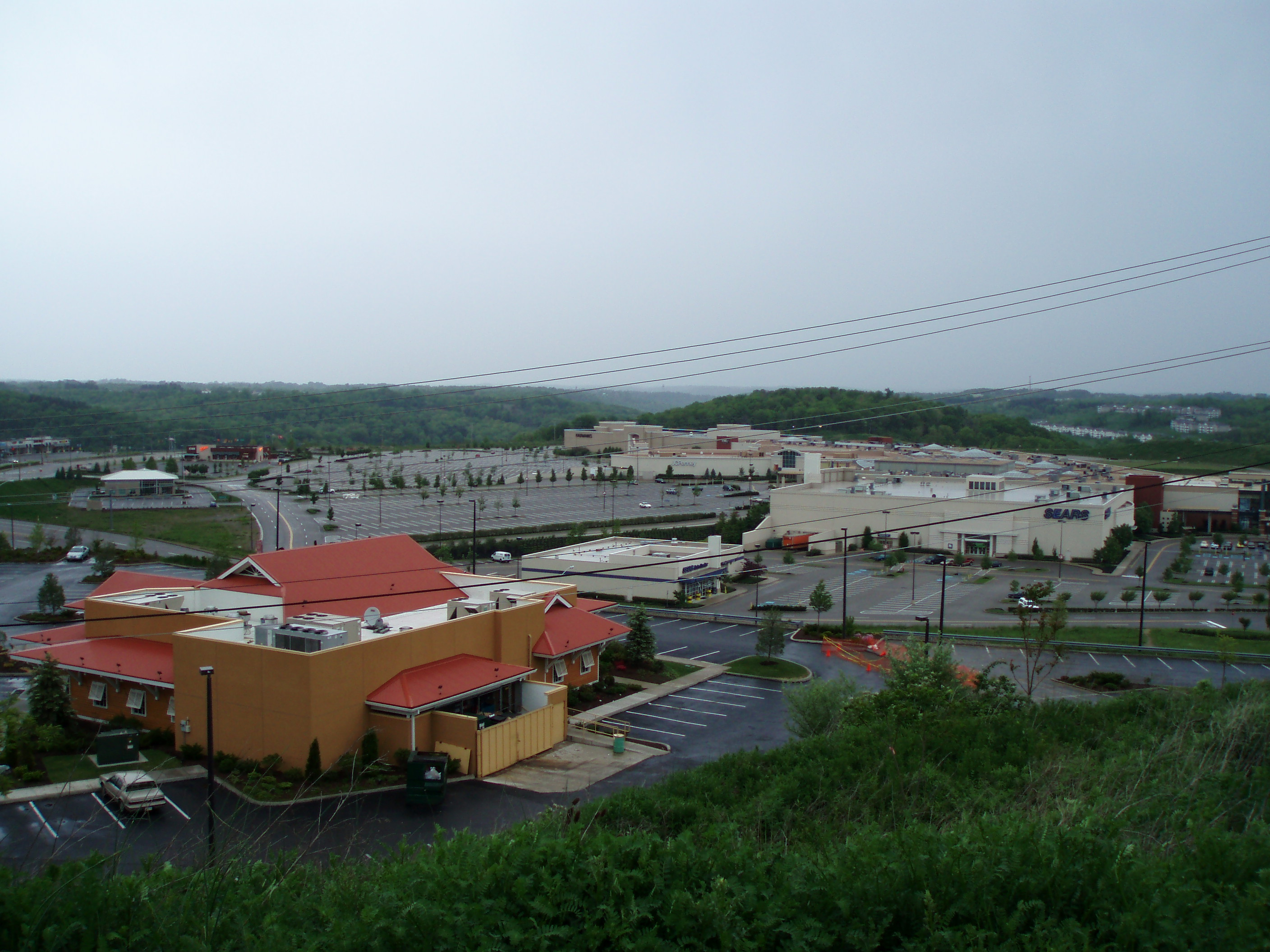
- View of The Mall at Robinson

- Flag Logo

- Location in Allegheny County and state of Pennsylvania
- Coordinates: 40°27′29″N 80°7′42″W
- Country: United States
- State: Pennsylvania
- County: Allegheny

Area
  - Total: 15.34 sq mi (39.72 km^{2})
  - Land: 15.22 sq mi (39.42 km^{2})
  - Water: 0.12 sq mi (0.31 km^{2})

Population (2020)
  - Total: 15,503
  - Density: 1,019/sq mi (393.3/km^{2})
- Time zone: UTC-5 (Eastern (EST))
  - Summer (DST): UTC-4 (EDT)
- FIPS code: 42-003-65352
- Website: https://townshipofrobinson.com/

Robinson Township is a township in Allegheny County, Pennsylvania, United States, approximately 12 miles (19 km) west of Pittsburgh. The population was 15,503 at the 2020 census. Home to Robinson Town Centre, Settlers Ridge and the Mall at Robinson, the township serves as a retail hub for the Pittsburgh metropolitan area.

== Geography ==
Robinson Township is located at 40°27′28″N 80°7′41″W (40.458008, -80.128259).

According to the United States Census Bureau, the township has a total area of 14.9 square miles (39 km^{2}), of which 14.8 square miles (38 km^{2}) is land and 0.2 square miles (0.52 km^{2}), or 1.21%, is water.

Robinson is composed of at least four distinct regions that represent former communities that once existed within the township: Groveton (industrial area near the Ohio River), Forest Grove (the area around Montour High and Elementary School and former now demolished school Forest Grove Elementary, Gayly (The area around Settlers Ridge Shopping Center and The Mall at Robinson), and Moon Run (also a part of Kennedy Township, and includes the areas near Burkett Park and Chartiers Country Club). Each of these areas can be roughly defined by the borders of the Township's voting precincts; each region comprising two to three separate precincts.

=== Surrounding and adjacent neighborhoods ===
Robinson Township has nine land borders, including Kennedy Township and the Pittsburgh neighborhood of Fairywood to the east, Thornburg, Rosslyn Farms, and Carnegie to the southeast, Collier Township to the south, and North Fayette Township, Moon Township, and Coraopolis to the west. Across the back channel of the Ohio River, Robinson Township runs adjacent with Neville Township. Robinson Township also completely surrounds Pennsbury Village in the southeast.

== Demographics ==
Historical population
| Census | Pop. | Note | %± |
|---|---|---|---|
| 1850 | 1,917 | | — |
| 1860 | 2,100 | | 9.5% |
| 1870 | 2,275 | | 8.3% |
| 1880 | 1,170 | | −48.6% |
| 1890 | 1,242 | | 6.2% |
| 1900 | 2,341 | | 88.5% |
| 1910 | 3,129 | | 33.7% |
| 1920 | 3,453 | | 10.4% |
| 1930 | 3,970 | | 15.0% |
| 1940 | 3,775 | | −4.9% |
| 1950 | 4,769 | | 26.3% |
| 1960 | 7,935 | | 66.4% |
| 1970 | 10,158 | | 28.0% |
| 1980 | 9,416 | | −7.3% |
| 1990 | 10,830 | | 15.0% |
| 2000 | 12,289 | | 13.5% |
| 2010 | 13,354 | | 8.7% |
| 2020 | 15,503 | | 16.1% |
U.S. Decennial Census

As of the census of 2000, there were 12,289 people, 4,828 households, and 3,312 families residing in the township. The population density was 833.2 inhabitants per square mile (321.7/km^{2}). There were 5,158 housing units at an average density of 349.7 units per square mile (135.0 units/km^{2}). The racial makeup of the township was 95.25% White, 1.90% African American, 0.06% Native American, 2.04% Asian, 0.02% Pacific Islander, 0.14% from other races, and 0.59% from two or more races. Hispanic or Latino of any race were 0.73% of the population.

There were 4,828 households, out of which 30.1% had children under the age of 18 living with them, 58.2% were married couples living together, 7.7% had a female householder with no husband present, and 31.4% were non-families. 27.0% of all households were made up of individuals, and 7.9% had someone living alone who was 65 years of age or older. The average household size was 2.45 and the average family size was 3.01.

In the township the population was spread out, with 22.8% under the age of 18, 5.9% from 18 to 24, 31.4% from 25 to 44, 26.0% from 45 to 64, and 13.8% who were 65 years of age or older. The median age was 40 years. For every 100 females, there were 96.8 males. For every 100 females age 18 and over, there were 93.2 males.

The median income for a household in the township was $55,263, and the median income for a family was $66,807. Males had a median income of $46,750 versus $30,605 for females. The per capita income for the township was $26,802. About 4.8% of families and 6.6% of the population were below the poverty line, including 8.2% of those under age 18 and 6.0% of those age 65 or over.

== Economy ==
Robinson Township is known in the area as a retail hub. The Mall at Robinson is located in the township, as well as the open-air Settlers Ridge and several smaller plazas. Bayer USA is based in Robinson Township as well.

=== Twin Hi-Way Drive-In ===
The Twin Hi-Way Drive-In was a drive-in theater located in Robinson Township on Pennsylvania Route 60. Situated on the original Lincoln Highway, the Twin Hi-Way was named after the road's original dual-route designation of U.S. 22/U.S. 30 and retained the name after both routes were reassigned in 1953. It closed at the end of the 1996 season. In 2007, the Twin Hi-Way was reborn with a complete overhaul and a second screen added two years later. Despite its popularity, it was announced in early 2016 that the Twin Hi-Way would not be reopening. As of March 2021, the projection room/concessions building, second screen in the back of the lot, and the radio transmission tower are the only remnants of the Twin Hi-Way still standing.

== Government and politics ==
In recent elections, Robinson has leaned Republican in Presidential elections and has leaned Democratic in local races. Robinson was carried by Republicans Mitt Romney in the 2012 U.S. Presidential Election and by Donald Trump in the 2016 U.S. Presidential Election, albeit by a diminished margin. Democrat Conor Lamb carried Robinson Township in 2018 Pennsylvania's 18th congressional district special election.

Presidential Elections Results
| Year | Republican | Democratic | Third Parties |
|---|---|---|---|
| 2020 | 51% 4,770 | 47% 4,443 | 1% 96 |
| 2016 | 55% 4,129 | 44% 3,336 | 1% 56 |
| 2012 | 57% 3,929 | 43% 2,955 | 0% 59 |

== Education ==
Robinson Township is served by the Montour School District. Montour High School and the new Montour Elementary school share a campus located in Robinson ("The Hilltop"). Two former elementary school campuses - Burkett and Forest Grove - are located in Robinson. Private and charter schools located in Robinson Township include The Robinson Christian School, Propel Montour Middle/High School (formerly Burkett Elementary School), and Archangel Gabriel Catholic School (formerly known as Holy Trinity Catholic School).
