= Crafton, Pennsylvania =

Borough in Pennsylvania, US

- Borough
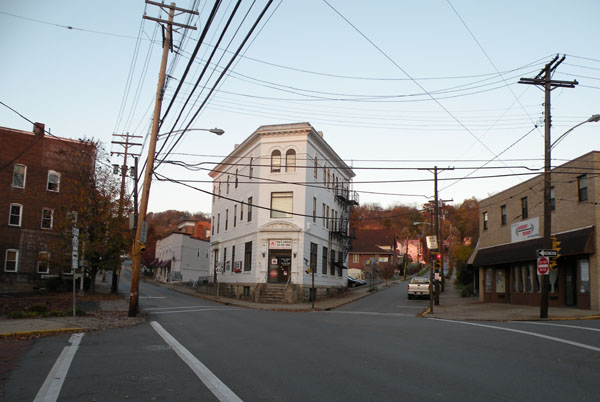
- Intersection of East Crafton, Noble and Dinsmore Avenues in Crafton

- Location in Allegheny County and the state of Pennsylvania
- Coordinates: 40°26′1.93″N 80°4′5.33″W
- Country: United States
- State: Pennsylvania
- County: Allegheny

Government
  - Type: Borough
  - Body: Borough Council
  - Mayor: Coletta Perry
  - Council President: John Oliverio

Area
  - Total: 1.14 sq mi (2.96 km^{2})
  - Land: 1.14 sq mi (2.96 km^{2})
  - Water: 0 sq mi (0.00 km^{2})

Population (2020)
  - Total: 6,099
  - Density: 5,339.0/sq mi (2,061.41/km^{2})
- Time zone: UTC−5 (EST)
  - Summer (DST): UTC−4 (EDT)
- ZIP Code: 15205
- Area codes: 412, 878
- FIPS code: 42-16848
- Website: www.craftonborough.gov

Crafton is a borough in Allegheny County, Pennsylvania, United States, west of downtown Pittsburgh. The population was 6,099 at the 2020 census. It is a residential suburb in the Pittsburgh metropolitan area.

== History ==
Prior to European colonial usurpation, the area was inhabited and controlled by the Seneca Indians. It is believed the legendary chief of the Seneca, Cornplanter, called the area Killemun. But even before the Seneca came, the Crafton/Ingram area was inhabited. In her 1993 historical account, local historian and Crafton-native, Betsy Martin, writes that, “Burial mounds from a much earlier pre-Columbian Adena Culture were found farther down the [Chartiers] creek toward the ‘Rocks’ in the vicinity of the Fall Hole.” It is likely Martin is referring to a mound site near the junction of the Creek with the Ohio River, a site which underwent excavations in 1896 by the Carnegie Museum. The excavation unearthed at least 33 burials, all “Early Woodland Adena in affiliation.” The Indians who built the mounds are believed to be Algonquin. While there is no way of knowing exactly which mounds Martin talked about, the reality is that such ancient interment mounds and early-indigenous habitation sites were strewn across the entire Chartiers Valley region, including Crafton/Ingram. Throughout the 20th Century, however, most of the sites were destroyed as a result of industrial development and building construction.

For obvious reasons, the Chartiers Creek was the dominant geographical feature during the premodern era, winding a northwesterly path to its terminus in the Ohio River at McKees Rocks. By 1749/1750, The French, under the aegis of King Louis XV, were staking land claims throughout the creek valley and surrounding forested hills and open meadows. George Washington passed through the area for the first time in 1752, along with his guide, Christopher Gist.

Crafton is named after James S. Craft, a frontier attorney who was granted land near the "forks of the Ohio" in present-day Oakland. The sale of this land part financed purchases of land in the Chartiers valley. Charles Craft, son of James, divided the land into lots on the death of his father and submitted it to the Allegheny County Courthouse as Crafton. After a period of building, the borough was incorporated on January 8, 1892, with Charles as the first burgess. Crafton was linked to downtown Pittsburgh by trolley in 1896. The service ended when the Fort Pitt Bridge was built without trolley tracks.

== Geography ==
Crafton is located at 40°26′2″N 80°4′5″W (40.433869, -80.068146). According to the United States Census Bureau, the borough has an area of 1.1 square miles (2.8 km^{2}), all land.

=== Surrounding and adjacent neighborhoods ===
Crafton has six land borders, including Ingram to the north and the Pittsburgh neighborhoods of Crafton Heights to the northeast, Westwood to the east, Oakwood and East Carnegie to the south, and Fairywood to the northwest. Across Chartiers Creek, Crafton runs adjacent with Thornburg to the west and Rosslyn Farms to the southwest.

== Demographics ==
Historical population
Census	Pop.	Note	%±
1900	1,927		—
1910	4,583		137.8%
1920	5,954		29.9%
1930	7,004		17.6%
1940	7,163		2.3%
1950	8,066		12.6%
1960	8,418		4.4%
1970	8,233		−2.2%
1980	7,623		−7.4%
1990	7,188		−5.7%
2000	6,706		−6.7%
2010	5,951		−11.3%
2020	6,099		2.5%

As of the 2000 census, there were 6,706 people, 3,079 households, and 1,613 families residing in the borough. The population density was 5,916.0 people per square mile (2,284.2 people/km^{2}). There were 3,344 housing units at an average density of 2,950.1 per square mile (1,139.0/km^{2}). The racial makeup of the borough was 95.50% White, 2.74% African American, 0.10% Native American, 0.60% Asian, 0.07% Pacific Islander, 0.15% from other races, and 0.84% from two or more races. Hispanic or Latino of any race were 0.57% of the population.

There were 3,080 households, out of which 24.9% had children under the age of 18 living with them, 38.2% were married couples living together, 10.6% had a female householder with no husband present, and 47.6% were non-families. 40.2% of all households were made up of individuals, and 14.3% had someone living alone who was 65 years of age or older. The average household size was 2.17 and the average family size was 3.01. In the borough the population was spread out, with 21.6% under the age of 18, 8.6% from 18 to 24, 32.5% from 25 to 44, 22.6% from 45 to 64, and 14.8% who were 65 years of age or older. The median age was 38 years. For every 100 females, there were 90.1 males. For every 100 females age 18 and over, there were 86.9 males.

The median income for a household in the borough was $38,323, and the median income for a family was $52,386. Males had a median income of $38,292 versus $24,497 for females. The per capita income for the borough was $21,441. About 3.4% of families and 6.9% of the population were below the poverty line, including 6.5% of those under age 18 and 6.2% of those age 65 or over.

== Government and politics ==
Presidential elections results
Year	Republican	Democratic	Third parties
2020	36% 1,353	60% 2,232	2% 78
2016	37% 1,175	57% 1,810	5% 170
2012	41% 1,191	57% 1,677	2% 53

== Notable people ==
- Bill Cowher (born 1957), NFL analyst and former coach for the NFL's Pittsburgh Steelers, he is a native of Crafton and attended Carlynton High School
- Alpha L. Bowser (1910–2003), United States Marine Corps lieutenant general, he was a combat veteran of World War II and the Korean War—decorated for his actions during the Battle of Iwo Jima and the Battle of Chosin Reservoir, respectively.
- Chevalier Jackson (1865-1958), physician and pioneer in laryngology
- Paul Shannon (1909–1990), legendary Pittsburgh radio and television host

== Gallery ==
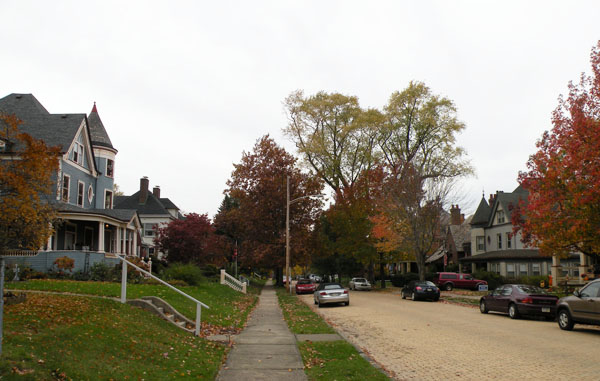
Creighton Avenue, platted in 1895

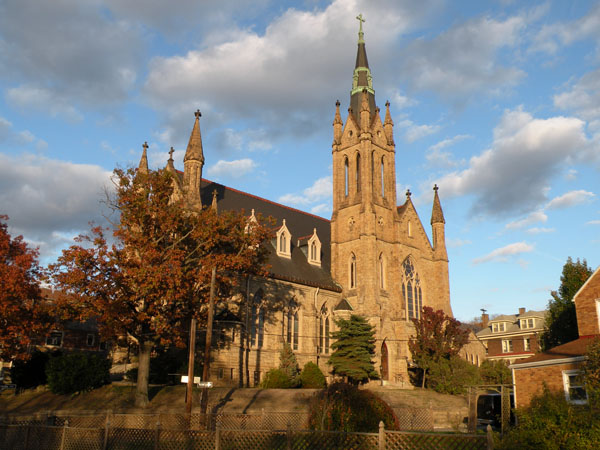
St. Philip Roman Catholic Church, built in 1906, located at 50 West Crafton Avenue

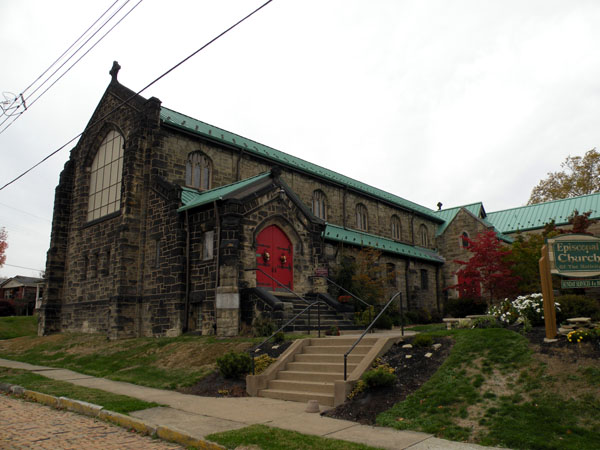
Episcopal Church of the Nativity, built in 1908, located at 33 Alice Street

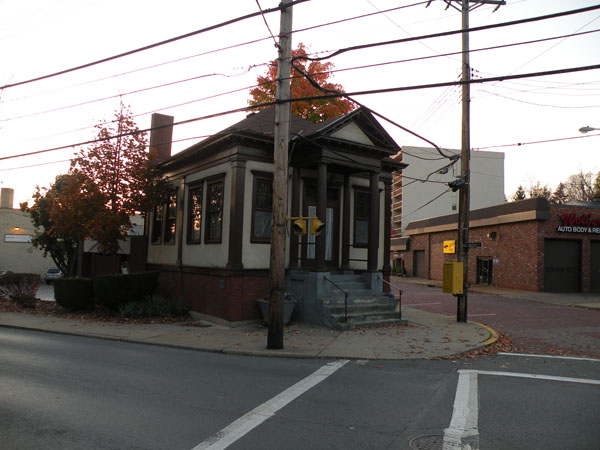
The Campbell Building, circa 1910, located at 3 Crafton Square

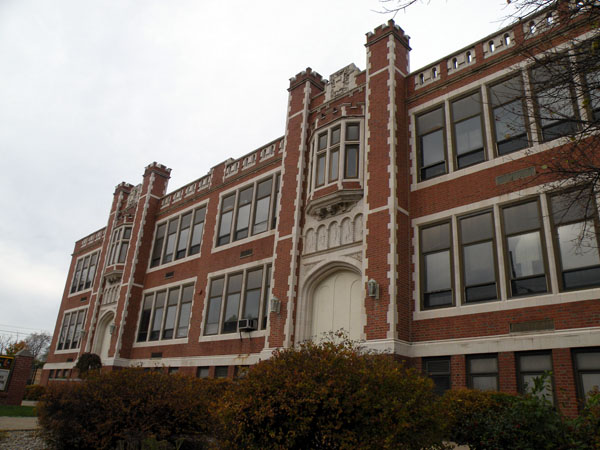
Crafton Elementary School, built in 1913, located at 1874 Crafton Boulevard

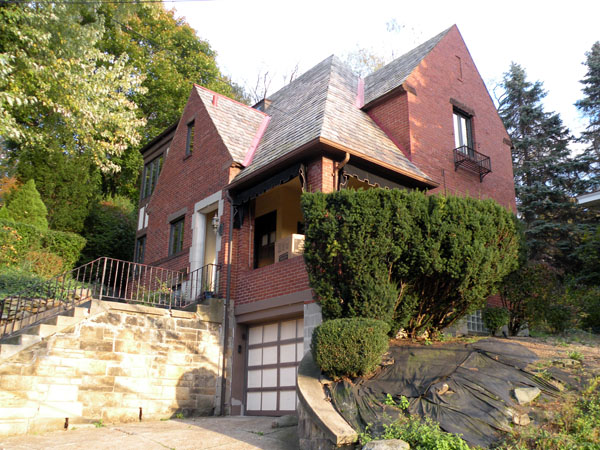
The George Leber House, built in 1938, located at 132 East Crafton Avenue

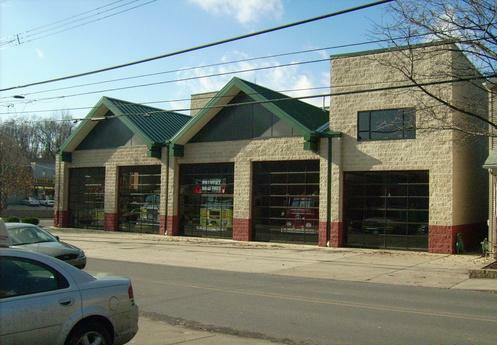
Crafton Volunteer Fire Hall, located at Noble and Bradford avenues

Preceded by Ingram	Bordering communities of Pittsburgh	Succeeded by Rosslyn Farms
