= Kennedy Township, Allegheny County, Pennsylvania =

Township in Pennsylvania, US

Kennedy Township
- Township
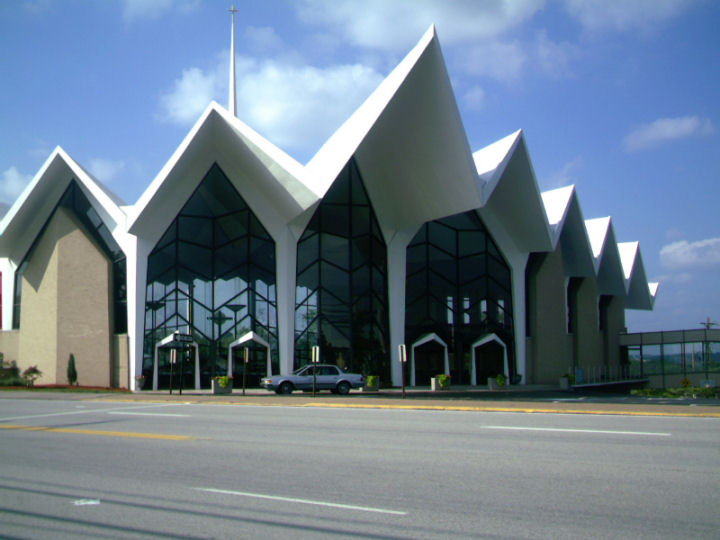
- Archangel Gabriel Parish on Forest Grove Road (previously St. Malachy Church).
- Motto(s): A Great Place To Live, Work, and Worship
- Location in Allegheny County and state of Pennsylvania
- Coordinates: 40°28′45″N 80°6′23″W
- Country: United States
- State: Pennsylvania
- County: Allegheny

Government
  - President of Board: Anthony Mollica (R)

Area
  - Total: 5.53 sq mi (14.32 km^{2})
  - Land: 5.48 sq mi (14.20 km^{2})
  - Water: 0.046 sq mi (0.12 km^{2})

Population (2020)
  - Total: 8,701 ▲
  - Estimate (2022): 8,528
  - Density: 1,483.6/sq mi (572.81/km^{2})
- Time zone: UTC-5 (Eastern (EST))
  - Summer (DST): UTC-4 (EDT)
- ZIP code: 15136, 15108
- Area codes: 412, 878
- FIPS code: 42-003-39312
- Website: https://www.kennedytwp.com/

Kennedy Township is a township in Allegheny County, Pennsylvania, United States, located 10 miles west of Pittsburgh and 12 miles east of Pittsburgh International Airport. The population was 8,701 at the 2020 United States Census.

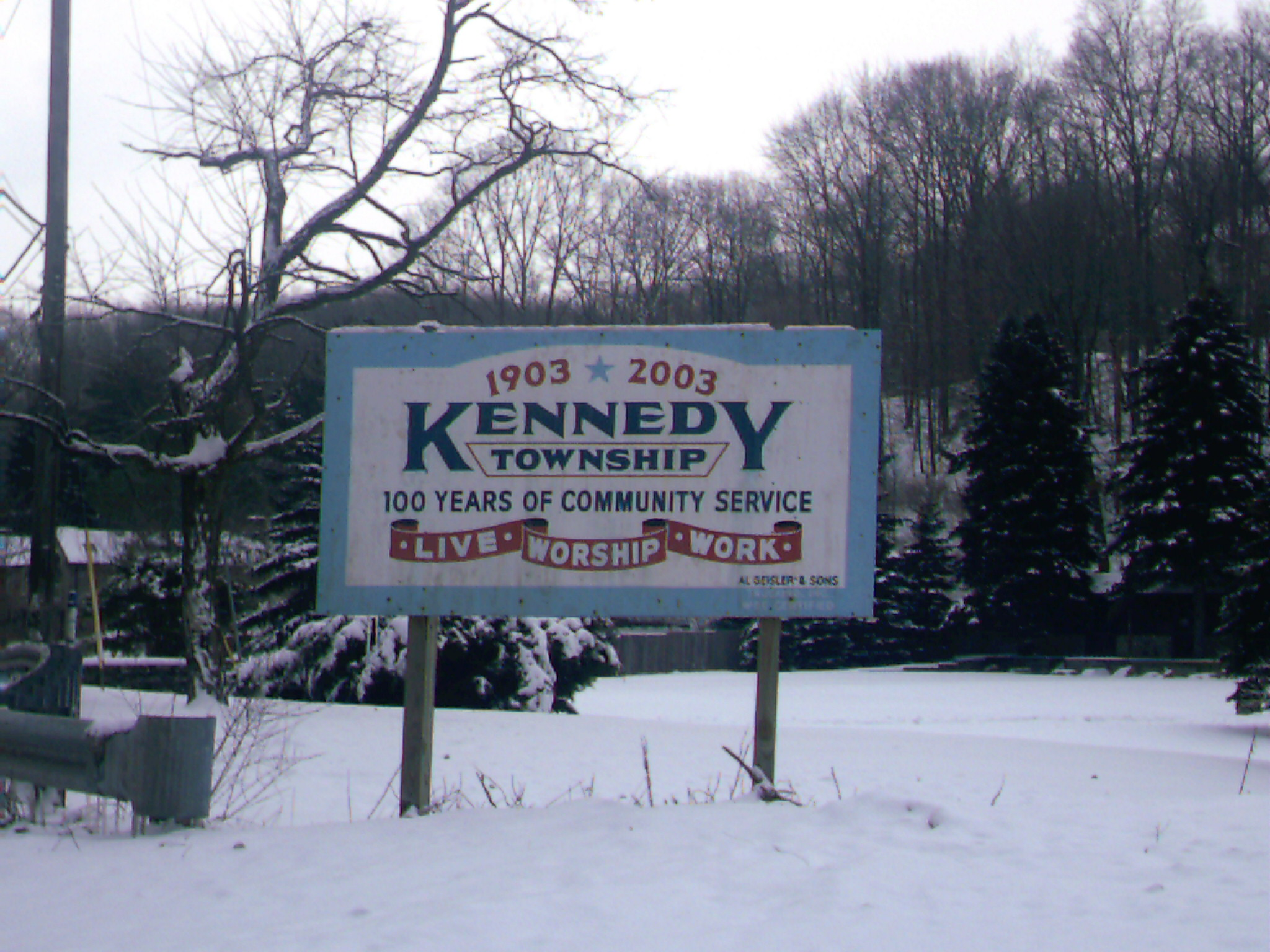
Kennedy Township's Welcome Sign

== Education ==
Kennedy Township is situated in the Montour School District. David E. Williams Middle School is located within the township. Before 2017, elementary students from Kennedy typically attended either Forest Grove Elementary or Burkett Elementary in Robinson Township. As of 2017, all Montour elementary students attend Montour Elementary School, located next to Montour High School in Robinson.

St. Malachy Catholic School, Heritage Valley School of Nursing, Rosedale Technical College, Sto-Rox Elementary schools and the public charter Propel Montour Elementary School are also located in Kennedy Township.

== Institutions ==
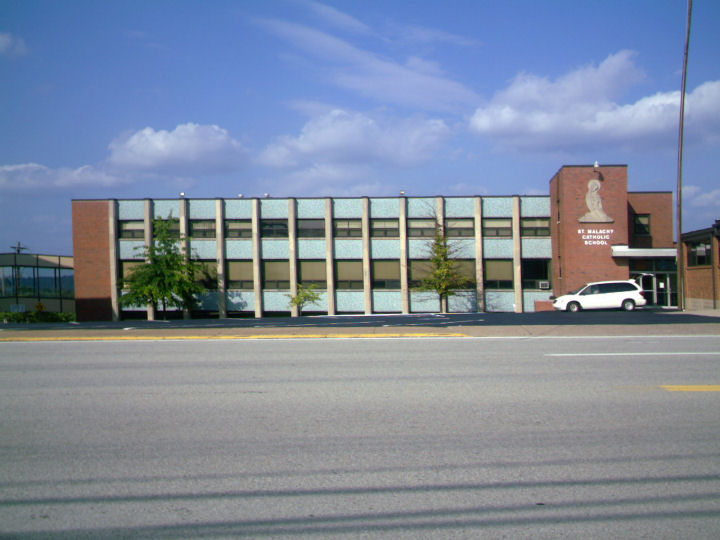
Archangel Gabriel Catholic School

Kennedy is home to several churches: Archangel Gabriel Parish (previously known as St. Malachy Catholic Church until it merged with Holy Trinity in Robinson Township and Saint John of God from McKees Rocks in 2020), Kenmawr United Presbyterian, and Kennedy First Alliance.

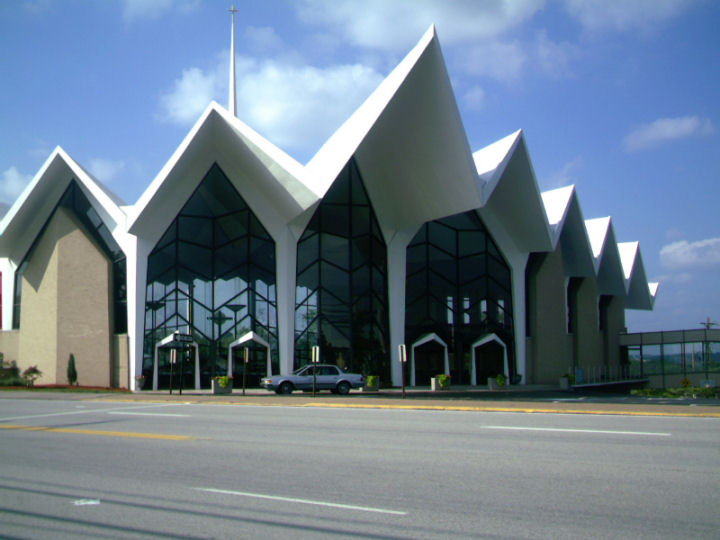
Archangel Gabriel Parish

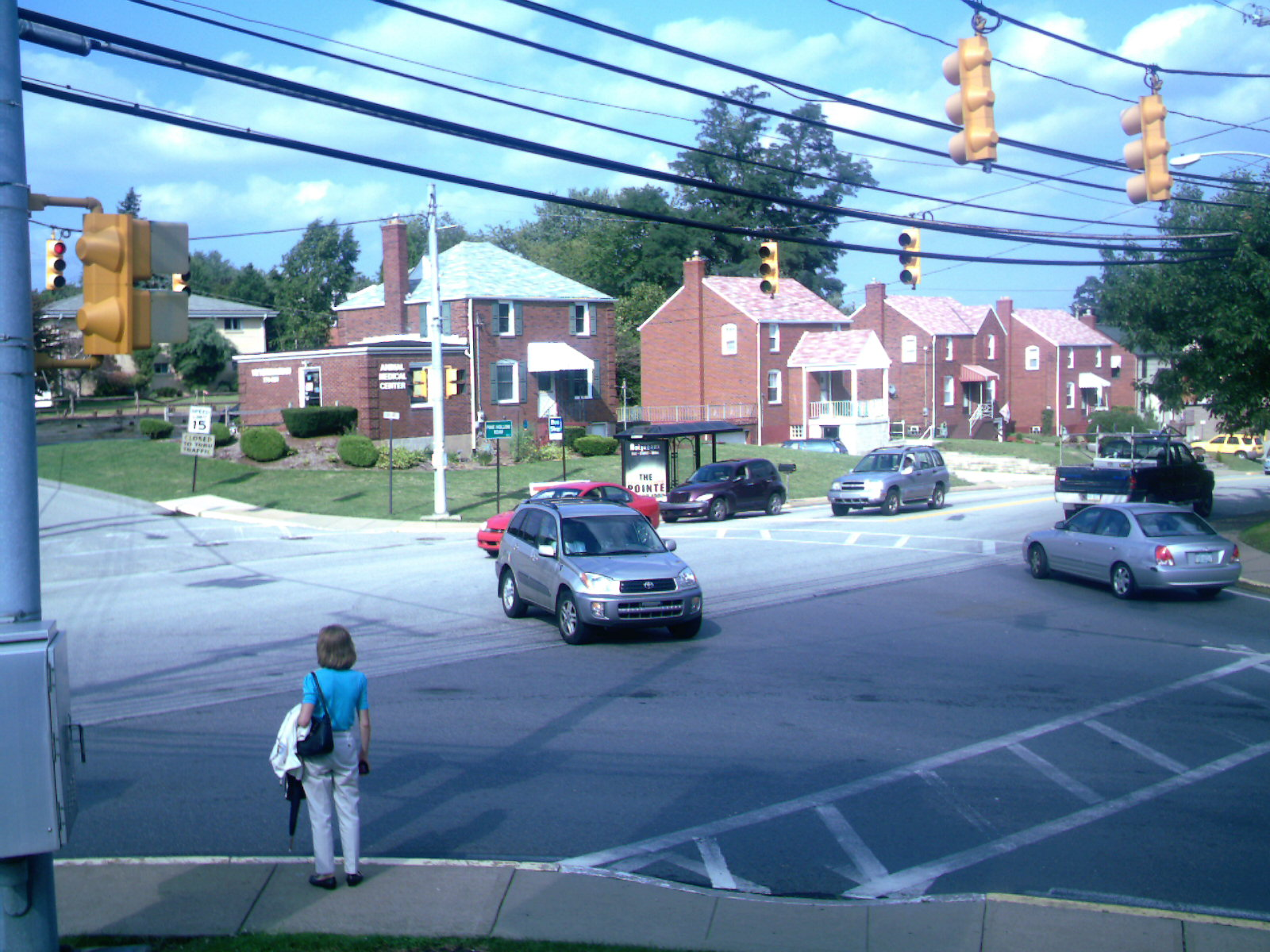
Intersection of Pine Hollow Road and Fairhaven Road, two of the main thoroughfares in Kennedy.

== Amenities ==
The Kenmawr Conservation Area is a 60-acre wooded nature park owned and maintained by the Hollow Oak Land Trust. The perennial stream that runs the length of the park is an unnamed tributary of Moon Run. Informal trails meander through the scenic valley.

Fairhaven Park, located on Fairhaven Road, is a large park containing several baseball fields, 2 basketball courts, tennis courts, a deck hockey court, horseshoe pits, bocce courts, playgrounds, a handful of picnic pavilions, and a fitness trail.

== Geography ==
Kennedy Township is located at 40°28′45″N 80°6′23″W (40.479292, -80.106395).

According to the United States Census Bureau, the township has a total area of 5.5 square miles (14 km^{2}), of which 5.4 square miles (14 km^{2}) is land and 0.1 square miles (0.26 km^{2}), or 0.91%, is water.

=== Neighborhoods ===
- Apple Hill
- Forest Grove Estates
- Kenmawr Crest
- Oak Pointe
- Ryland Manor
- Pickford – Located off Clever Road near the I-79 underpass
- Stanford Court – located on a "horseshoe curve" at Coraopolis and Old Fleming Park Rds. (PA Route 51). This site was previously occupied by a drive-in movie theater, the Kenmawr Drive-In (1949–1986)
- Island Heights (western half)
- Julianna Pointe
- Middletown Village
- Kennedy Ridge
- Castleview Estates
- Kennedy Woodlands
- Sir Henry's Haven
- Kennedy Highlands
- Long Ridge Estates
- Kennedy Pines
- Kennedy Overlook

=== Surrounding communities ===
Kennedy Township is bordered by McKees Rocks to the east, the Pittsburgh neighborhoods of Windgap and Fairywood to the southeast, Robinson Township to the south and west, and Stowe Township to the northeast. Also, a portion of the Ohio River's back channel runs through the border of Kennedy Township and Neville Township, a/k/a Neville Island.

== Demographics ==
Historical population
Census	Pop.	Note	%±
1970	6,589		—
1980	7,159		8.7%
1990	7,265		1.5%
2000	7,504		3.3%
2010	7,672		2.2%
2020	8,701		13.4%
2022 (est.)	8,528		−2.0%
U.S. Decennial Census

As of the census of 2000, there were 7,504 people, 2,917 households, and 2,190 families residing in the township. The population density was 1,378.3 inhabitants per square mile (532.2/km^{2}). There were 2,980 housing units at an average density of 547.3 units per square mile (211.3 units/km^{2}). The racial makeup of the township was 98.64% White, 0.51% African American, 0.01% Native American, 0.48% Asian, 0.03% Pacific Islander, 0.04% from other races, and 0.29% from two or more races. 0.29% of the population were Hispanic or Latino of any race.

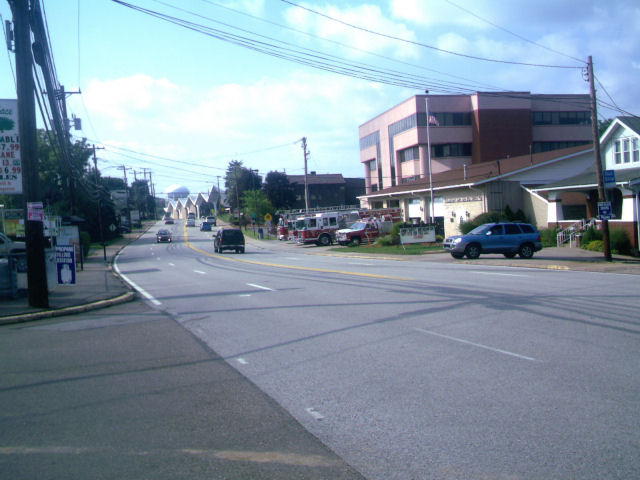
Looking west on Pine Hollow Road, Kennedy's main street

There were 2,917 households, out of which 27.6% had children under the age of 18 living with them, 62.6% were married couples living together, 9.1% had a female householder with no husband present, and 24.9% were non-families. 22.9% of all households were made up of individuals, and 13.0% had someone living alone who was 65 years of age or older. The average household size was 2.49 and the average family size was 2.93.

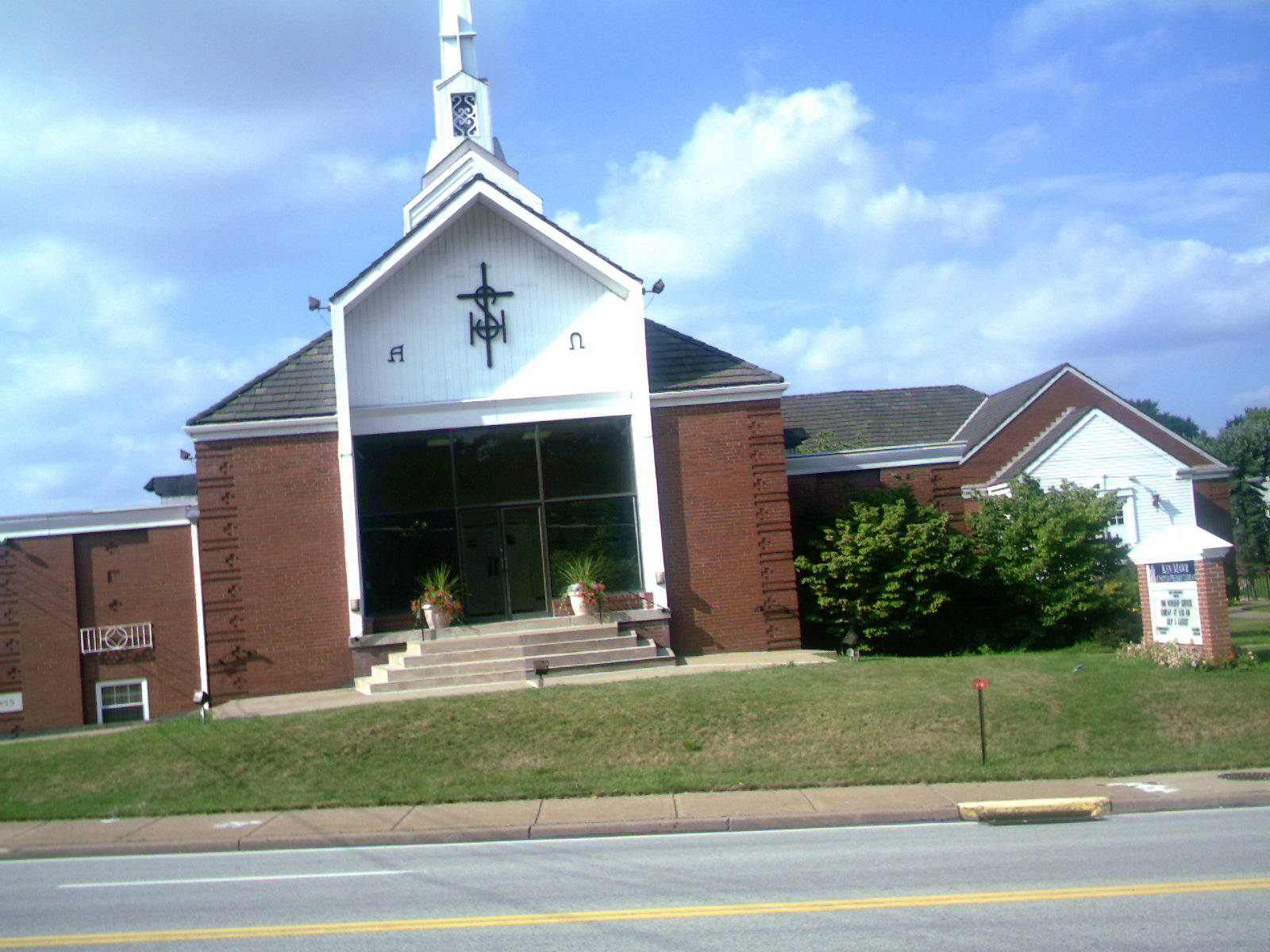
Kenmawr United Presbyterian Church

In the township the population was spread out, with 20.5% under the age of 18, 5.5% from 18 to 24, 24.9% from 25 to 44, 26.0% from 45 to 64, and 23.1% who were 65 years of age or older. The median age was 44 years. For every 100 females, there were 91.4 males. For every 100 females age 18 and over, there were 86.7 males.

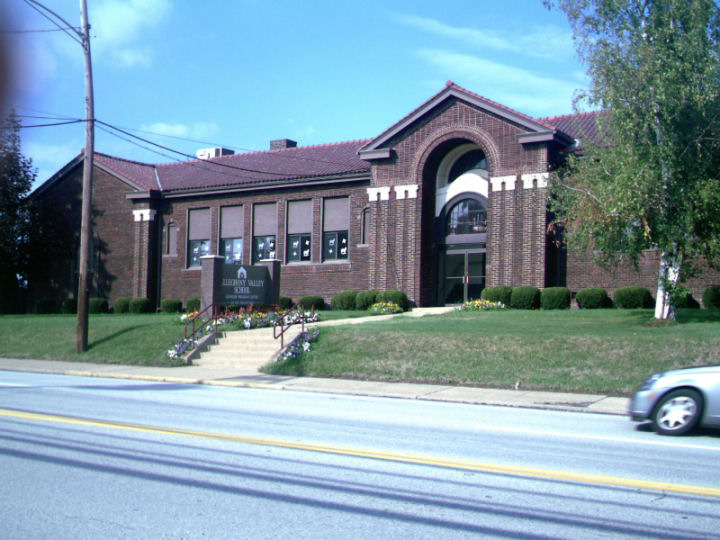
Allegheny Valley School, formerly Kenmawr Elementary and then Miller School of Dance, is a special needs school in Kennedy.

The median income for a household in the township was $48,057, and the median income for a family was $56,339. Males had a median income of $41,062 versus $28,125 for females. The per capita income for the township was $22,148. About 2.0% of families and 3.8% of the population were below the poverty line, including 1.3% of those under age 18 and 4.8% of those age 65 or over.

== Notable people ==
Gary Vituccio, who served as township manager from 2005 to 2009, was drafted by the Cincinnati Bengals during their inaugural season of 1968–69.

Nick Haden was selected by the Los Angeles Raiders in the seventh round (192nd overall) of the 1985 NFL Draft and played for the Philadelphia Eagles in 1986.

Michael Keaton, actor, was born in Kennedy. He is best known for many 1980s comedy movies such as "Beetlejuice" and "Johnny Dangerously". He is best known for playing the title character in "Batman".
