= Pennsbury Village, Pennsylvania =

Borough in Pennsylvania, US

- Borough
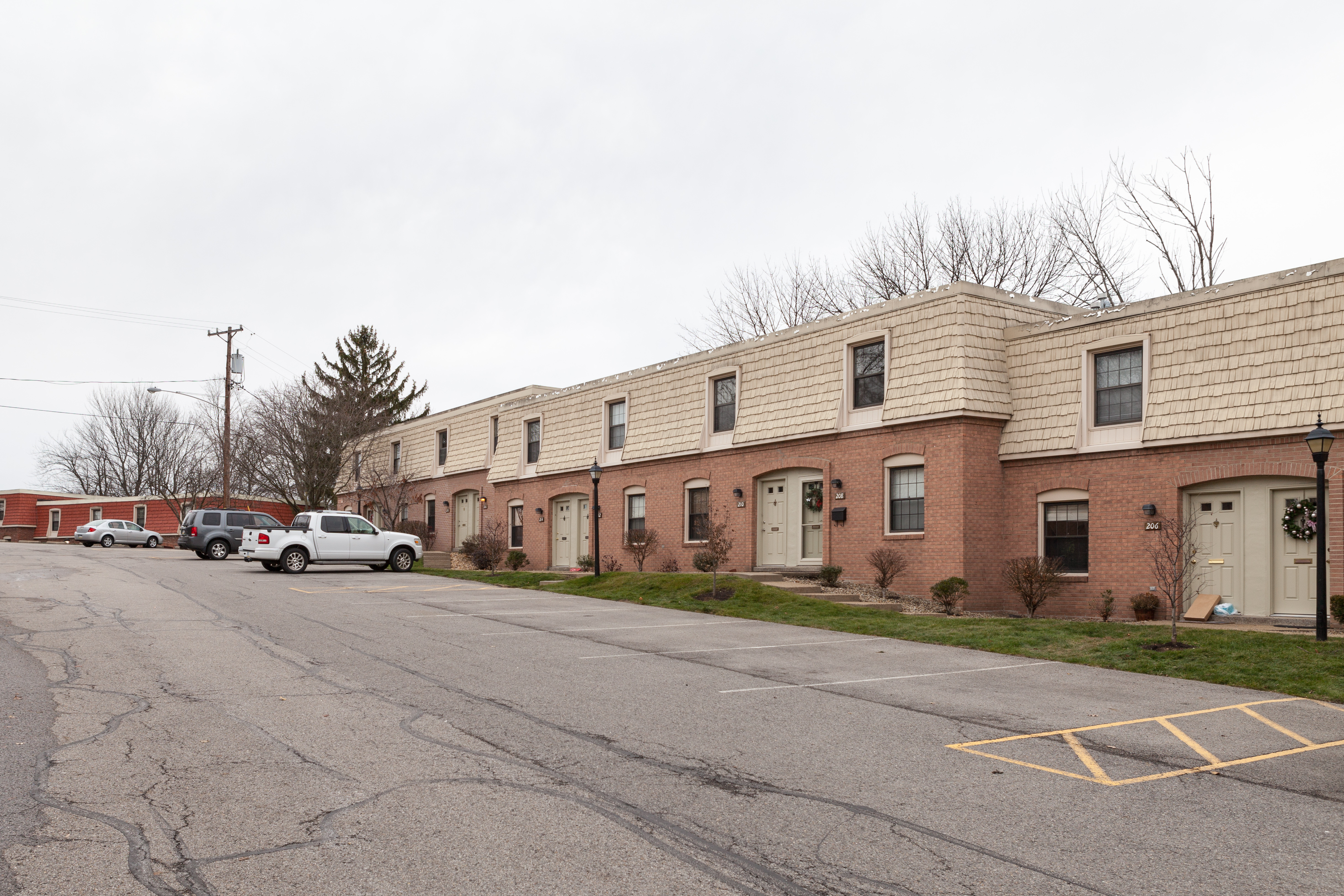
- A row of condos on Colony Court

- Location in Allegheny County and the state of Pennsylvania.
- Coordinates: 40°25′40″N 80°6′3″W
- Country: United States
- State: Pennsylvania
- County: Allegheny

Government
  - Mayor: Lucy Harper (D)

Area
  - Total: 0.077 sq mi (0.20 km^{2})
  - Land: 0.077 sq mi (0.20 km^{2})
  - Water: 0 sq mi (0.00 km^{2})

Population (2020)
  - Total: 677
  - Density: 8,978.6/sq mi (3,466.66/km^{2})
- Time zone: UTC-5 (Eastern (EST))
  - Summer (DST): UTC-4 (EDT)
- ZIP code: 15205
- Area code: 412
- FIPS code: 42-59152
- Website: pennsburyvillageboro.com

Pennsbury Village is a borough in Allegheny County, Pennsylvania, United States. The population was 677 at the 2020 census.

== History ==
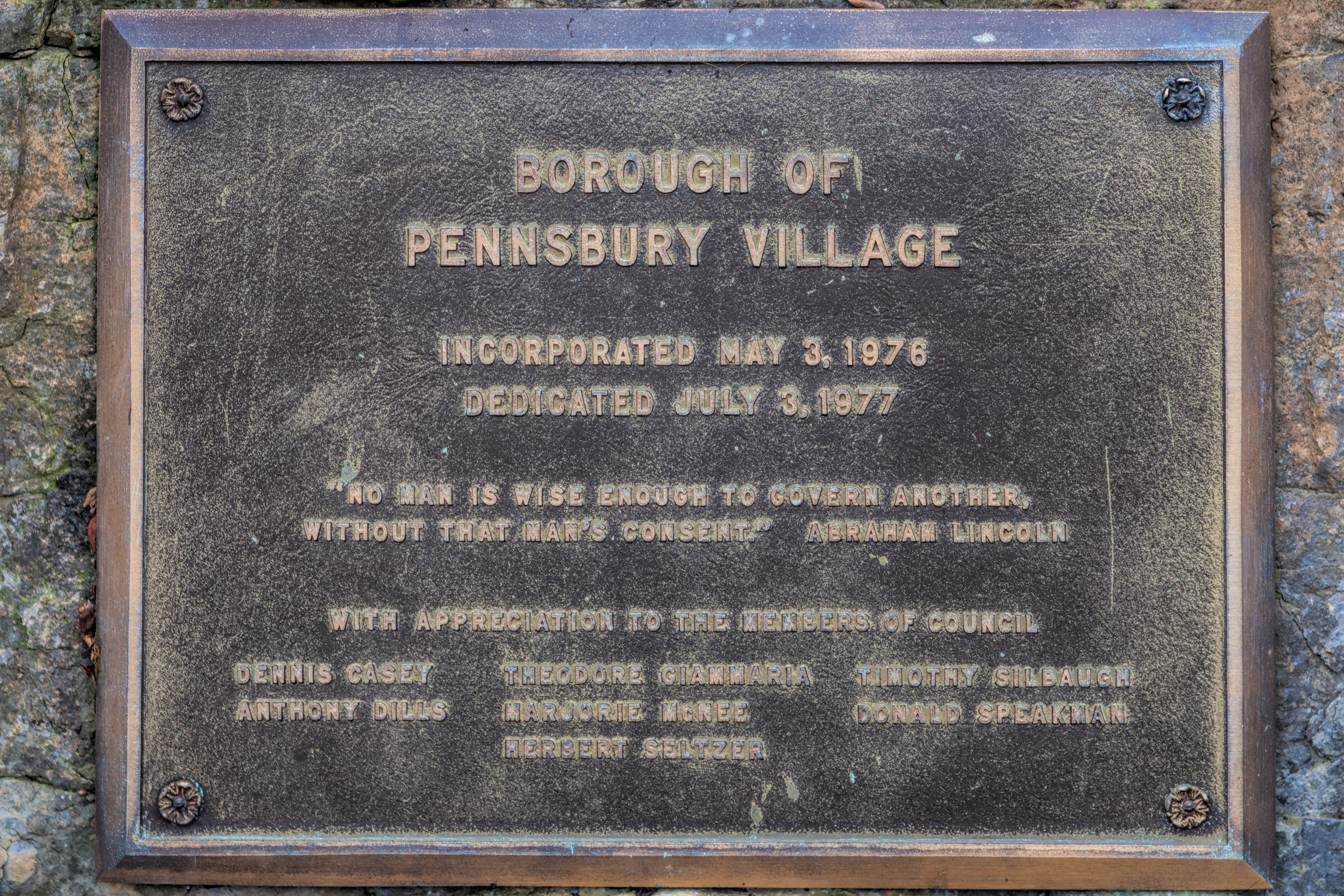
Dedication plaque: "No man is wise enough to govern another, without that man’s consent.” Abraham Lincoln

Pennsbury is a unique borough in that it is entirely a municipality of condo-style houses, having been built in 1973. In 1976, there was a disagreement with Robinson Township over proposed sewage treatment fees, which triggered the self-government attempt. In 1977, it separated from the surrounding township and became an Allegheny County borough. The words of the Declaration of Secession included "that we can govern our affairs more effectively and equitable than a distant and disinterested authority". The first council of officials and a mayor were elected and took office in January, 1977.

== Geography ==
Pennsbury Village is located at 40°25′40″N 80°6′3″W.

According to the United States Census Bureau, the borough has a total area of 0.1 square miles (0.26 km^{2}), all land.

== Education ==
Pennsbury Village is served by the Montour School District.

== Surrounding communities ==
Pennsbury Village is entirely surrounded by Robinson Township.

== Demographics ==
Historical population
Census	Pop.	Note	%±
1980	798		—
1990	774		−3.0%
2000	738		−4.7%
2010	661		−10.4%
2020	677		2.4%

As of the 2000 census, there were 738 people, 491 households, and 152 families living in the borough. The population density was 12,710.3 inhabitants per square mile (4,907.5/km^{2}). There were 500 housing units at an average density of 8,611.3 per square mile (3,324.8/km^{2}). The racial makeup of the borough was 95.93% White, 1.63% African American, 0.81% Native American, 0.81% Asian, 0.14% from other races, and 0.68% from two or more races. Hispanic or Latino of any race were 0.81% of the population.

There were 491 households, out of which 11.0% had children under the age of 18 living with them, 21.2% were married couples living together, 8.4% had a female householder with no husband present, and 69.0% were non-families. 61.9% of all households were made up of individuals, and 5.1% had someone living alone who was 65 years of age or older. The average household size was 1.50 and the average family size was 2.32.

In the borough the population was spread out, with 9.5% under the age of 18, 5.0% from 18 to 24, 50.4% from 25 to 44, 28.7% from 45 to 64, and 6.4% who were 65 years of age or older. The median age was 37 years. For every 100 females there were 68.1 males. For every 100 females age 18 and over, there were 64.1 males.

The median income for a household in the borough was $46,579, and the median income for a family was $55,125. Males had a median income of $42,222 versus $36,528 for females. The per capita income for the borough was $33,339. About 3.8% of families and 3.4% of the population were below the poverty line, including 6.6% of those under age 18 and 11.3% of those age 65 or over.

== Government and politics ==
Presidential election results
Year	Republican	Democratic	Third parties
2020	44% 216	53% 262	1% 7
2016	42% 188	53% 234	5% 22
2012	43% 181	55% 232	2% 12
