= Homestead Historic District (disambiguation) =

Homestead Historic District is a historic district in Homestead, Munhall, and West Homestead, Pennsylvania that is listed on the National Register of Historic Places (NRHP). It may also refer to:

(by state then city or town)

- Verdugo Homestead Historic District, Randolph, Arizona, listed on the NRHP in Pinal County, Arizona
- Pendley Homestead Historic District, Sedona, Arizona, NRHP-listed
- Walker Homestead Historic District, Garner, Arkansas, listed on the NRHP in White County, Arkansas
- Homestead Meadows Discontiguous District, Estes Park, Colorado, a historic district listed on the NRHP in Larimer County, Colorado
- MacFarlane Homestead Historic District, Coral Gables, Florida, NRHP-listed
- Homestead Historic Downtown District, Homestead, Florida, NRHP-listed
- Union Mills Homestead Historic District, Westminster, Maryland, NRHP-listed
- Buckner Homestead Historic District, Stehekin, Washington, NRHP-listed
