= Carrie Furnace =

- Carrie Blast Furnace Number 6 and 7
- U.S. National Register of Historic Places
- U.S. National Historic Landmark District
- Pittsburgh Landmark – PHLF
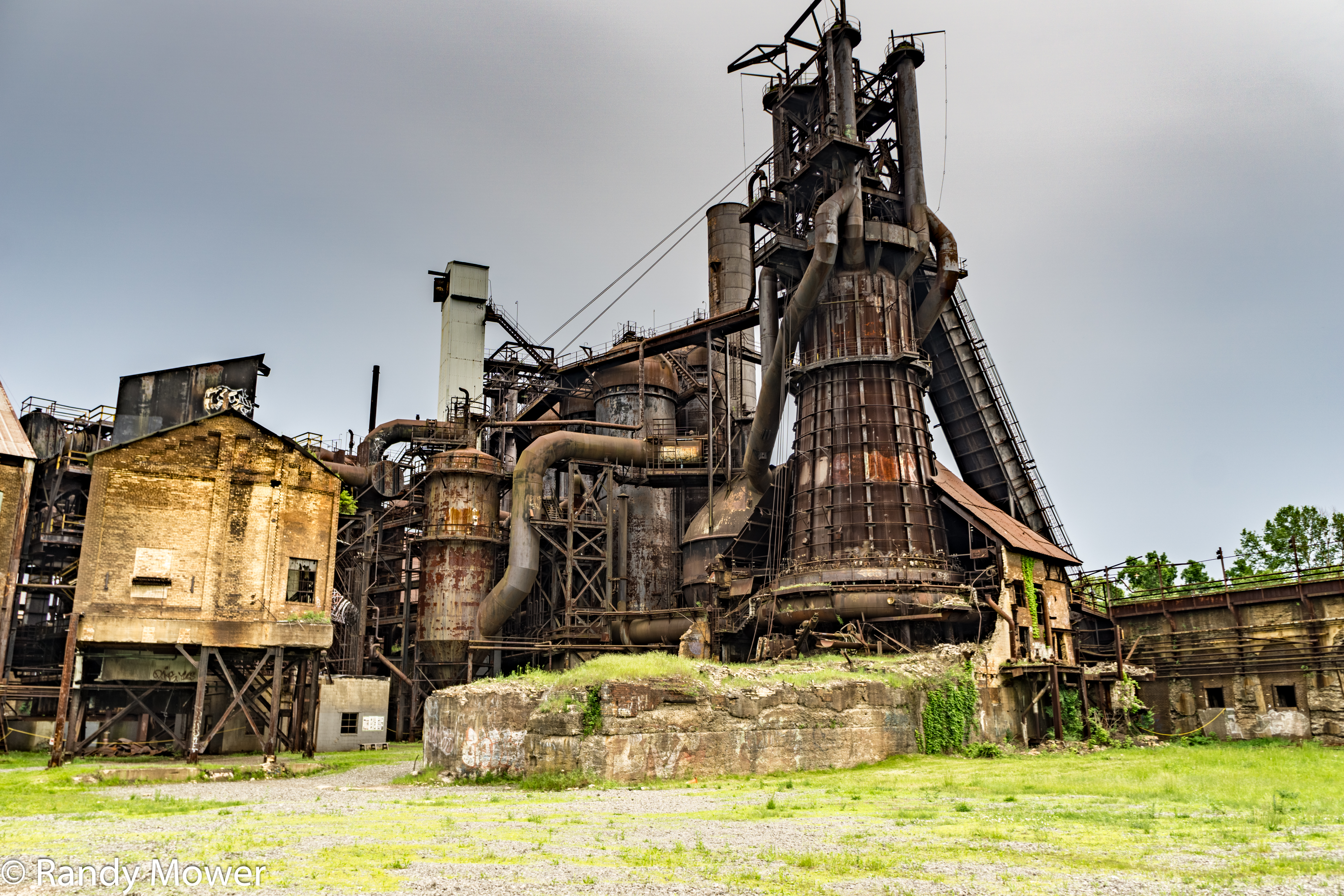
- Carrie Furnace

- Location within Pennsylvania Location within the United States
- Location: Northern side of the Monongahela River 0.5 miles west of the Rankin Bridge in Munhall, Rankin, and Swissvale
- Coordinates: 40°24′47.09″N 79°53′24.28″W
- Area: 168 acres (68 ha)
- Built: 1884
- NRHP reference No.: 06001070

Significant dates
- Added to NRHP: September 20, 2006
- Designated NHLD: September 20, 2006
- Designated PHLF: 1989

Carrie Furnace is a retired blast furnace located along the Monongahela River in the Pittsburgh area industrial town of Swissvale, Pennsylvania. It was one of the structures comprising the Homestead Steel Works. The Carrie Furnaces were built in 1884 and they operated until 1982. During its peak, the site produced 1,000 to 1,250 tons of iron per day. All that is left of the site are furnaces #6 and #7, which operated from 1907 to 1978, and its hot metal bridge (not to be confused with the Hot Metal Bridge farther downstream). The furnaces, designated a National Historic Landmark in 2006, are among the only pre-World War II 20th century blast furnaces to survive.

The site is currently managed by the nonprofit Rivers of Steel Heritage Corporation, which conducts tours and other programs from May through October.

Location:	Size:	Features:	Owner:	Current Use	Past Use:	Contaminants:	Total Actual Cost
Allegheny County, PA	168 Acres	Large Parcel, Flat Land, and Riverfront Location	Allegheny County	Vacant Land	Blast furnace	PCBs, Sulfates	$70–$100 million to convert Carrie Furnace #6 & #7 into a Steel Heritage Museum and Allegheny County has projected that the environmental clean-up would cost between $3–$5 million

== History, topography, and environmental concerns ==
The timeline below portrays the history of Carrie Furnace. Carrie Furnace is located along the Monongahela River, with 135 acres located on the north bank of the river and 33 acres on the south bank. The site, however, is not readily accessible as it is enclosed by railroad tracks. The surrounding areas include Braddock, Rankin, Swissvale, Whitaker, and Munhall. After the Park Corporation purchased the site from U.S. Steel in 1988, both parties agreed to address the environmental concerns. In 2005, Allegheny County purchased the land from Park Corps. for $5.75 million. Underground fuel storage tanks were removed in 1994 along with two above ground fuel storage units. In addition, asbestos from the buildings was removed. The soil was contaminated with PCBs and sulfates. Environmental assessment of the site has been conducted in two phases. The first phase was completed in 2007 and the second is currently underway.

- 1881 – Carrie Furnace is built
- 1892 – Homestead Strike
- 1898 – Site purchased by Andrew Carnegie
- 1901 – Incorporated into U.S. Steel
- 1978 – Shutdown
- 1988 – Sold to Park Corporation
- 2005 – Sold to Allegheny County for $5.75 million
- 2006 – Furnaces 6 and 7 were designated a National Historic Landmark
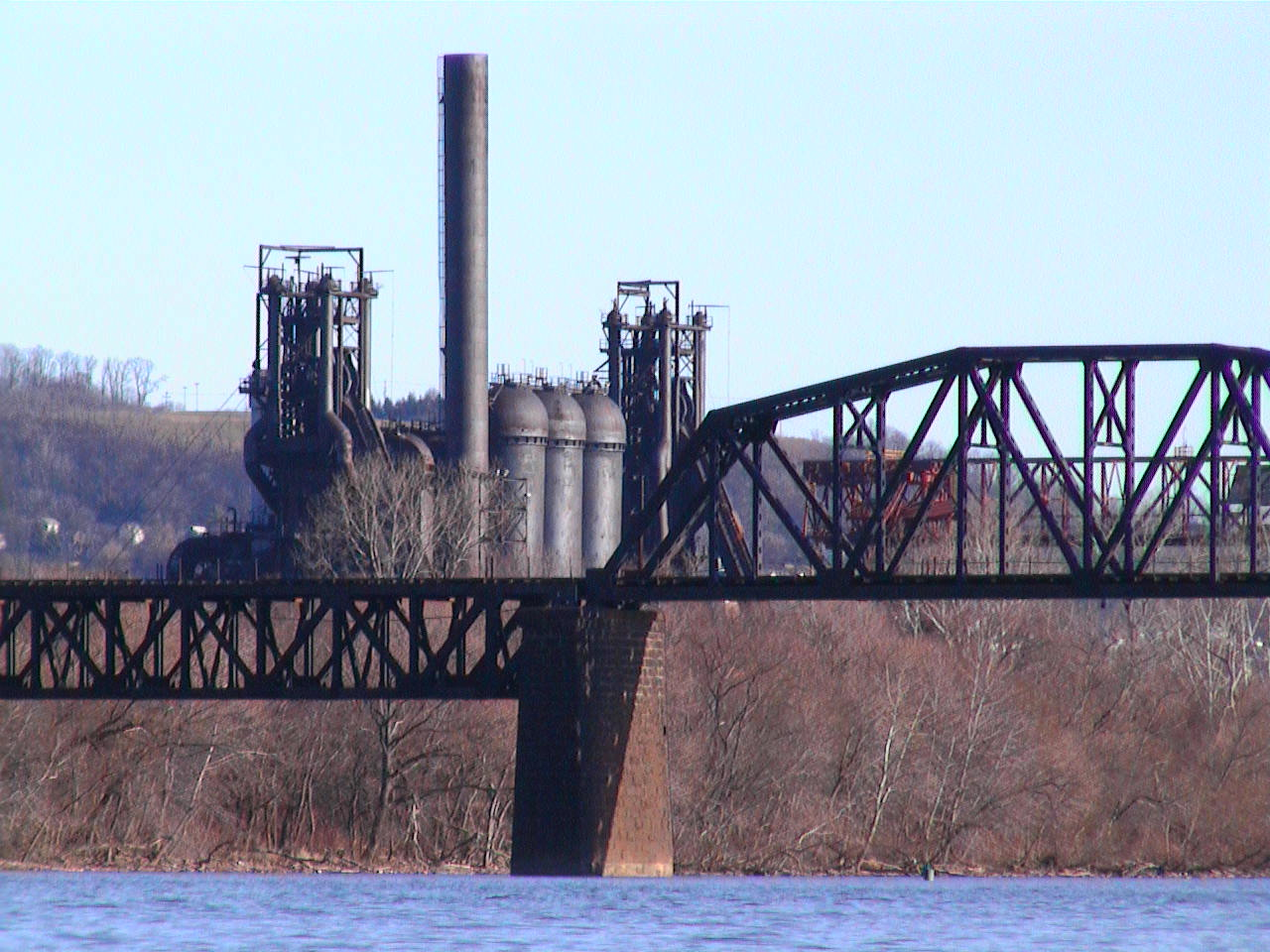
Monongahela River and Pinkerton's Landing Bridge in foreground

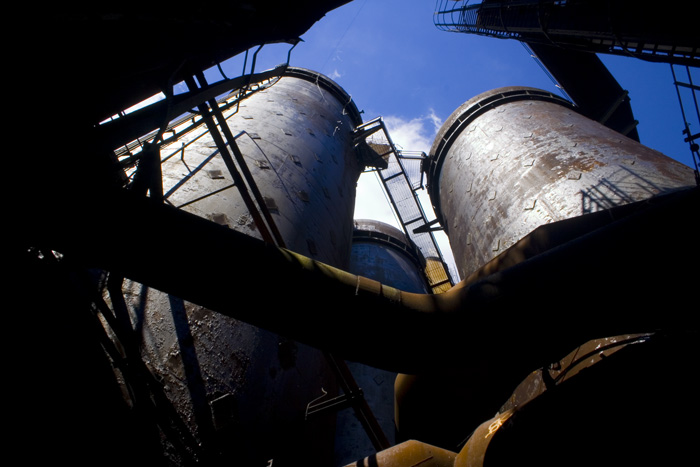
A View on the Hot Blast Stoves

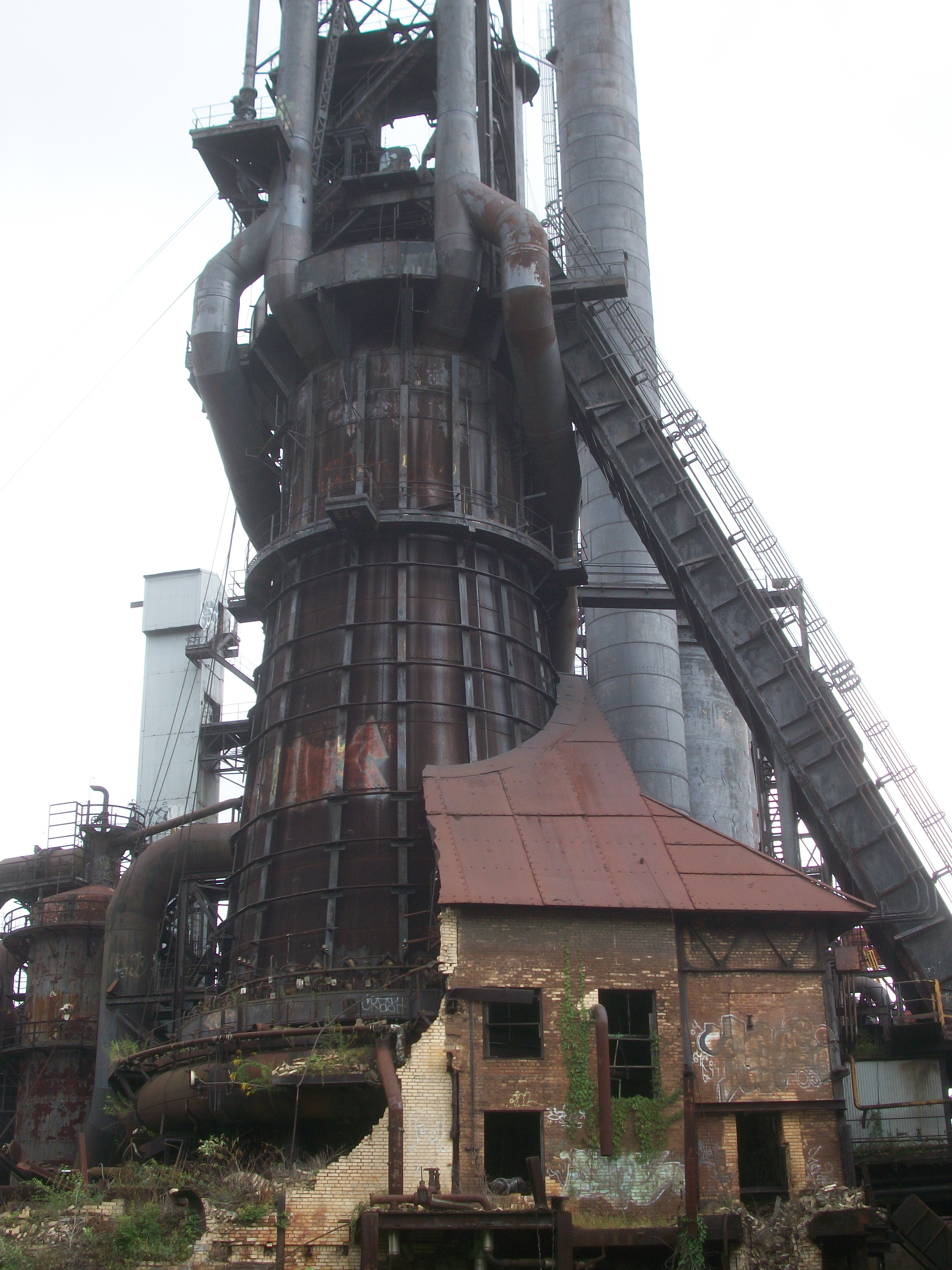
Blast Furnace #7, surrounded by ancillary structures left in a state of arrested decay

== Future development ==
Partners in the redevelopment of Carrie Furnace include Allegheny County, several nearby municipalities, and the Steel Industry Heritage Corporation. These organizations seek to preserve the remaining industrial structures while utilizing the site for economic development. The redevelopment plan is mixed-use as it contains plans for commercial and residential development, as well as light industrial manufacturing. Housing, office buildings, a hotel, a conference center, transportation center, and a museum are included in the plan. For example, the hot metal rail bridge that connected Carrie Furnace to Homestead Works is to be converted into an automobile bridge, which will allow access to the site. The bridge also connects the site to The Waterfront – a retail development across the Monongahela River. Additionally, the Rivers of Steel Heritage Corp. is working with Allegheny County on establishing a museum about the history of steel centered on the two blast furnaces still standing on the site.

== See also ==
- Carrie Furnace Hot Metal Bridge
