= Homestead Historic District =

Historic district in Pennsylvania, United States

- U.S. National Register of Historic Places
- U.S. Historic district
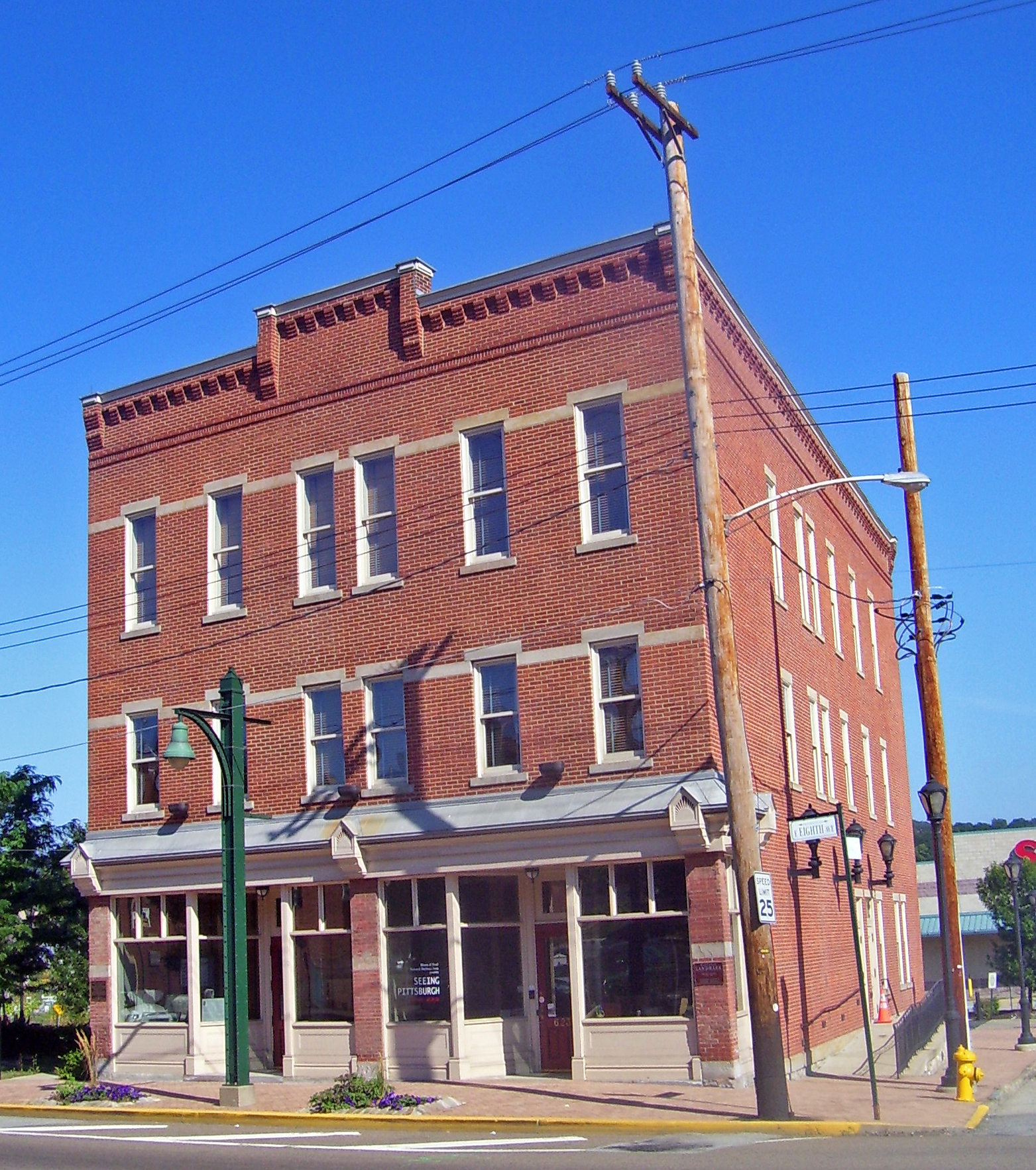
- The Bost Building, built in 1892, on East Eighth Avenue, was AA union headquarters during the Homestead Strike that year.

- Location within Pennsylvania Location within the United States
- Location: Eighth Ave. area roughly bounded by Mesta, Sixth, Andrew, 11th and Walnuts Sts. and Doyle and Seventh Aves., Homestead, Munhall, and West Homestead, Pennsylvania.
- Coordinates: 40°24′17″N 79°54′27″W
- Area: 202 acres (82 ha)
- Built: 1892
- Architect: Multiple
- Architectural style: Late Victorian, American Foursquare
- NRHP reference No.: 90000696
- Added to NRHP: May 10, 1990

The Homestead Historic District is a historic district which is located in Homestead, Munhall, and West Homestead, Pennsylvania.

It was listed on the National Register of Historic Places (NRHP) in 1990.

== History ==
This historic district encompasses the site of the Homestead Strike of 1892, when the Carnegie Steel Company, under the leadership of Henry Clay Frick, broke the Amalgamated Association of Iron and Steel Workers union.

This district also includes the Homestead Pennsylvania Railroad Station, which is separately listed on the NRHP, and the Bost Building, a U.S. National Historic Landmark.

It is situated close to Pittsburgh.

== Gallery ==
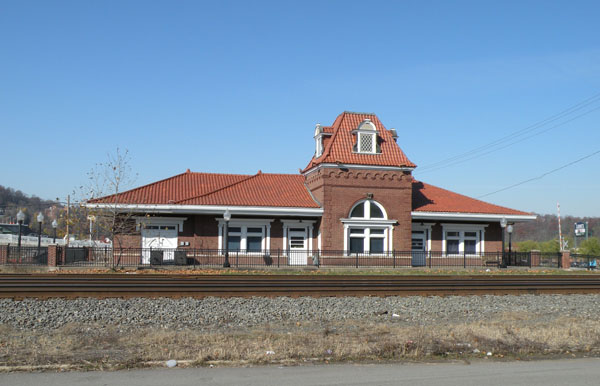
Homestead Pennsylvania Railroad Station, built circa 1890, on Amity Street in Homestead

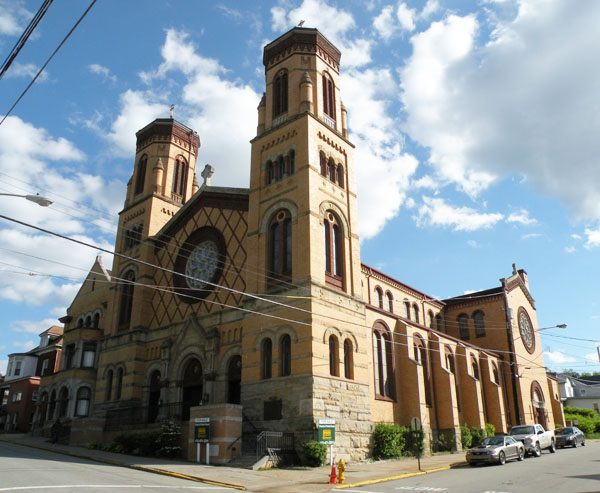
St. Mary Magdalene Church, built 1895, at 1008 Amity Street in Homestead

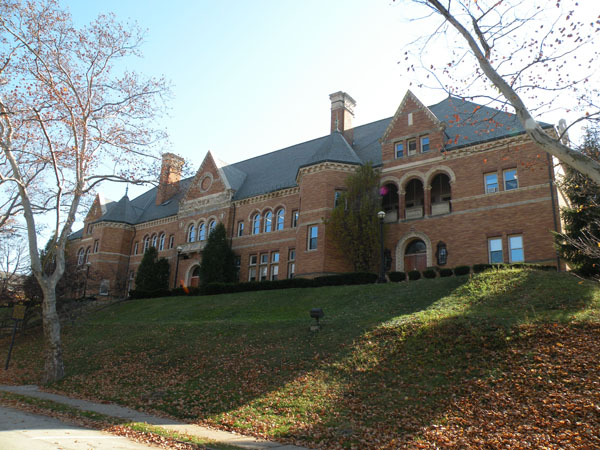
Carnegie Library of Homestead, built in 1896, at 510 East 10th Avenue in Munhall
