= Carrie Furnace Hot Metal Bridge =

Bridge over the Monongahela River in Pennsylvania, US

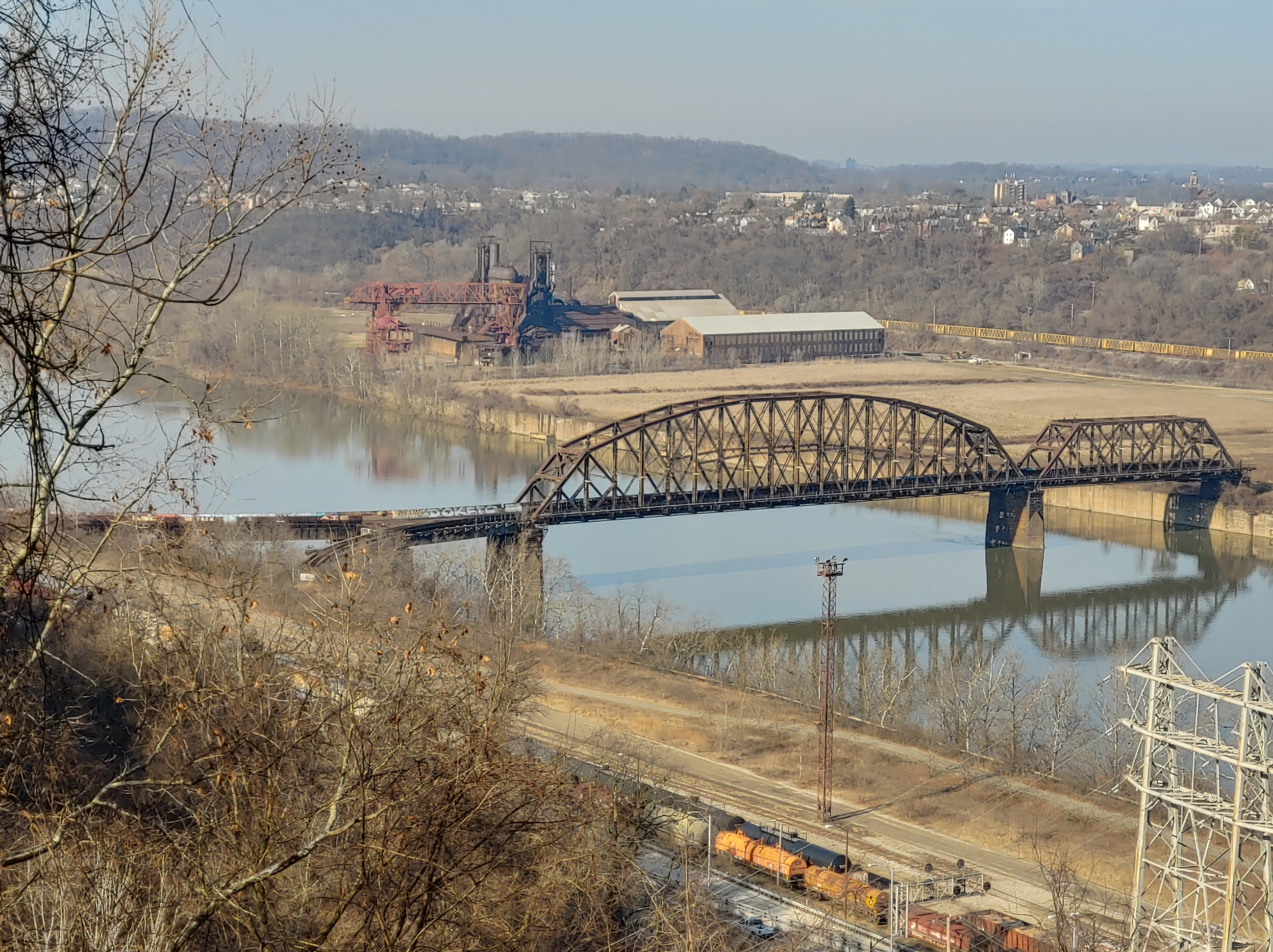
- Bridge with Carrie Furnace visible
- Coordinates: 40.407570°N 79.886704°W
- Carries: Union Railroad (Pittsburgh)
- Crosses: Monongahela River
- Locale: Whitaker, Pennsylvania and Rankin, Pennsylvania
- Official name: Rankin Hot Metal Bridge No. 35
- Other name(s): Union Railroad Rankin Hot Metal Bridge No. 35

Characteristics
- Design: Truss bridge
- Material: Steel
- Longest span: 483 feet (147 m)
- Piers in water: 3
- Clearance below: 50.8 feet (15.5 m)

History
- Opened: 1900

The Carrie Furnace Hot Metal Bridge (also known as the Union Railroad Rankin Hot Metal Bridge No. 35) is a railroad truss bridge across the Monongahela River between Whitaker, Pennsylvania, and Rankin, Pennsylvania. The bridge has been out of service since about 1982, when the Carrie Furnace closed.

== History ==
The bridge was built to carry freight between Whitaker and the US Steel Carrie Furnace, with the downstream line shielded for the use of hot metal trains. It opened on 31 December 1900 for hot metal traffic and on 14 June 1901 to general traffic. It is currently owned by the Rivers of Steel National Heritage Area.

In 2016, Allegheny County announced that it would begin assessing the bridge for future use by motor vehicles, cyclists and pedestrians. Making a direct connection with Pennsylvania Route 837 is one of the goals of the project, which officials hope will relieve backups for automobile traffic entering The Waterfront. The bridge would also provide cyclists and pedestrians a direct connection from the Carrie Furnace site to the Great Allegheny Passage.

== See also ==
- Carrie Furnace
- Homestead Steel Works
- List of bridges documented by the Historic American Engineering Record in Pennsylvania
- List of crossings of the Monongahela River
