= Bost Building =

- U.S. National Register of Historic Places
- U.S. National Historic Landmark
- U.S. Historic district – Contributing property
- Pennsylvania state historical marker
- Pittsburgh Landmark – PHLF
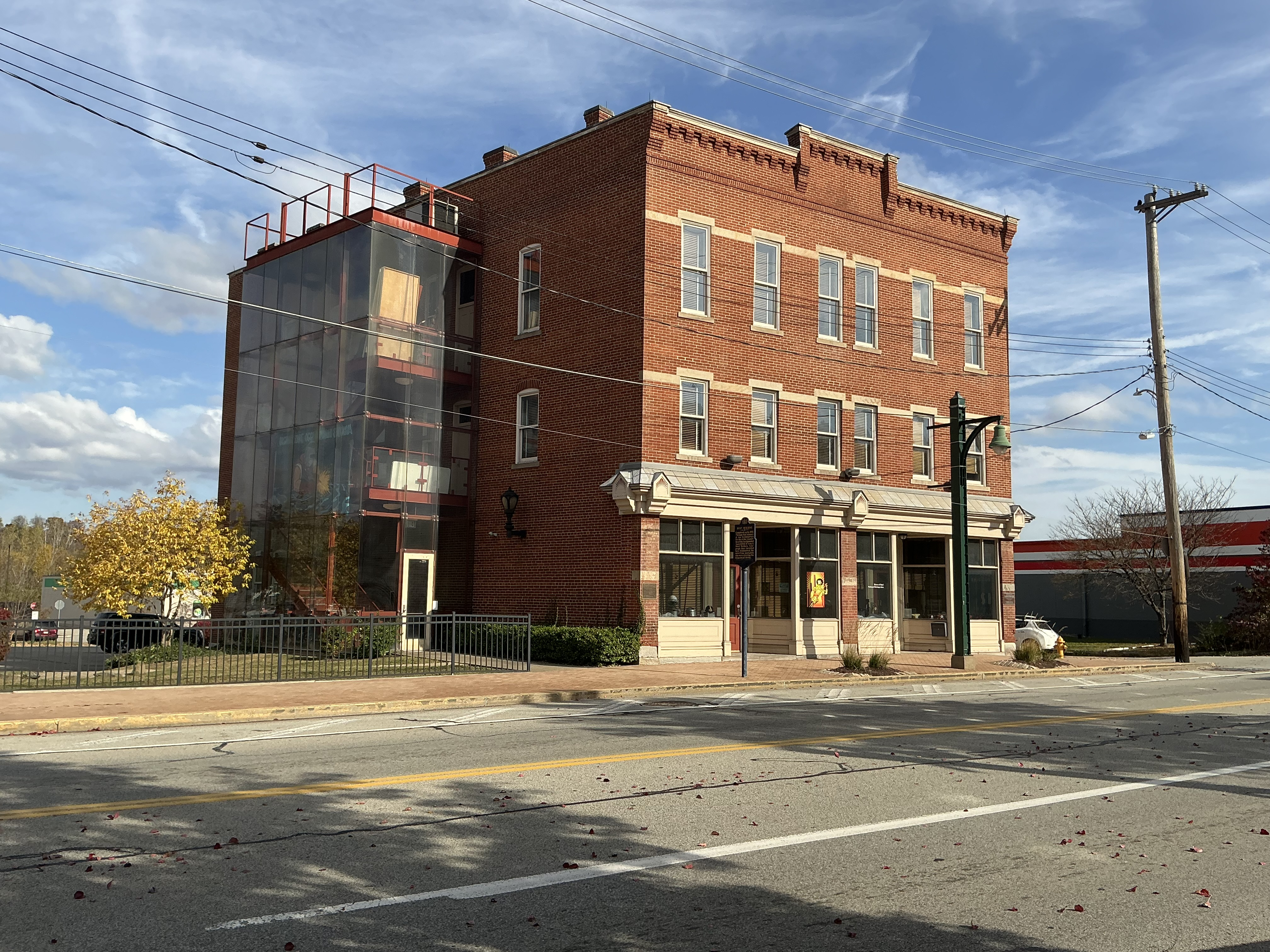
- Front Side, taken October 2024.

- Location within Pennsylvania Location within the United States
- Location: 621-623 East Eighth Avenue, Homestead, Pennsylvania
- Coordinates: 40°24′32.47″N 79°54′16.06″W
- Area: less than one acre
- Built: 1892
- Part of: Homestead Historic District (ID90000696)
- NRHP reference No.: 99000627

Significant dates
- Added to NRHP: January 20, 1999
- Designated NHL: January 20, 1999
- Designated CP: May 10, 1990
- Designated PHMC: July 07, 1992
- Designated PHLF: 2000

The Bost Building, also known as Columbia Hotel, is located on East Eighth Avenue (PA 837) in Homestead, Pennsylvania, United States. Built just before the 1892 Homestead Strike, it was used as headquarters by the Amalgamated Association of Iron and Steel Workers and for reporters covering the confrontation. It is the only significant building associated with the strike that remains intact. It is a contributing property to the Homestead Historic District. It was declared a National Historic Landmark in 1999.

After some use as a rooming house and hotel, today it serves as the headquarters and visitor center for the Rivers of Steel National Heritage Area.

== Museum ==
The museum features displays the area's industrial, social and cultural history. Exhibits include two restored rooms reflecting the 1892 Homestead Strike by the Amalgamated Association of Iron and Steel Workers during the Homestead Lockout and Strike, and a room dedicated to the Homestead Steel Works.

Visitors can pick up information about other sites of the area as well as driving tours of the area's communities that reflect the industries of steel, coal, aluminum and glass.

== Building ==
The building is 40 by 90 feet (12 by 27 m), located at the corner of East Eighth and Heisel Avenue. It is three stories high, faced in brick laid in common bond, resting on a stone foundation and topped with a flat asphalt roof.

Bands of stone run along the slightly skewed south (front) facade at the tops of all six windows on the upper stories, forming lintels to complement the similar sills. The roofline is marked with stepped brick corbels on the south and east. At the ground level on the east is a glass and aluminum storefront.

Inside, the first floor serves as a museum, with original floorboards and period wallpaper. One room has exhibits devoted to the history of the strike, the other to the building's restoration. The second and third stories consist of guest rooms that have been left largely intact since the strike. At the second floor stair landing, and the top of the stair, there is a section where the paint has peeled off and exposed graffiti on the underlying plaster. Pencilled in are the words "Homestead 1892" and some names. It is possible that it was left during the strike.

== History ==
Intended as a hotel for new hires or prospective hires at the growing Homestead Steel Works, which at the time were just next door, it had not entirely been finished inside when the company locked out its workers, precipitating the eventual strike. The union found it an ideal headquarters, since its upper floors had a commanding view of the factory next door. Reporters from American and British newspapers who covered the strike wired home their dispatches from a telegraph office on the first story. Deputy sheriffs and Pinkerton men taken captive during some of the violent confrontations were held at the Bost Building to protect them from retribution.

After the strike, the building did become a hotel and rooming house, although it was never successful in the long term. The only significant change to it was the alteration of the storefront during the 20th century, and some changes to the upper floors during its late 20th-century renovation to comply with contemporary fire codes.

== See also ==
- List of National Historic Landmarks in Pennsylvania
- National Register of Historic Places listings in Allegheny County, Pennsylvania
