= Rivers of Steel National Heritage Area =

United States National Heritage Area in Pennsylvania

Rivers of Steel National Heritage Area is a federally designated National Heritage Area in southwestern Pennsylvania, centered on Pittsburgh and oriented around the interpretation and promotion of the region's steel-making heritage. The area roughly covers the valleys of the Ohio, Monongahela and lower Allegheny rivers. Major interpretive locations include the Carrie Furnace, Pinkerton's Landing Bridge and other features of the Homestead Steel Works.

The national heritage area comprises Allegheny, Armstrong, Beaver, Butler, Greene, Fayette, Washington and Westmoreland counties.

Rivers of Steel National Heritage Area was designated in 1996 and is managed by the Rivers of Steel Heritage Corporation. The managing organization supports the designation of Homestead Works National Park, centered around the Carrie Blast Furnaces.

The visitor center, museum, and offices for the national heritage area are located in the Bost Building in Homestead.
