= Pinkerton's Landing Bridge =

Train bridge over Monongahela River

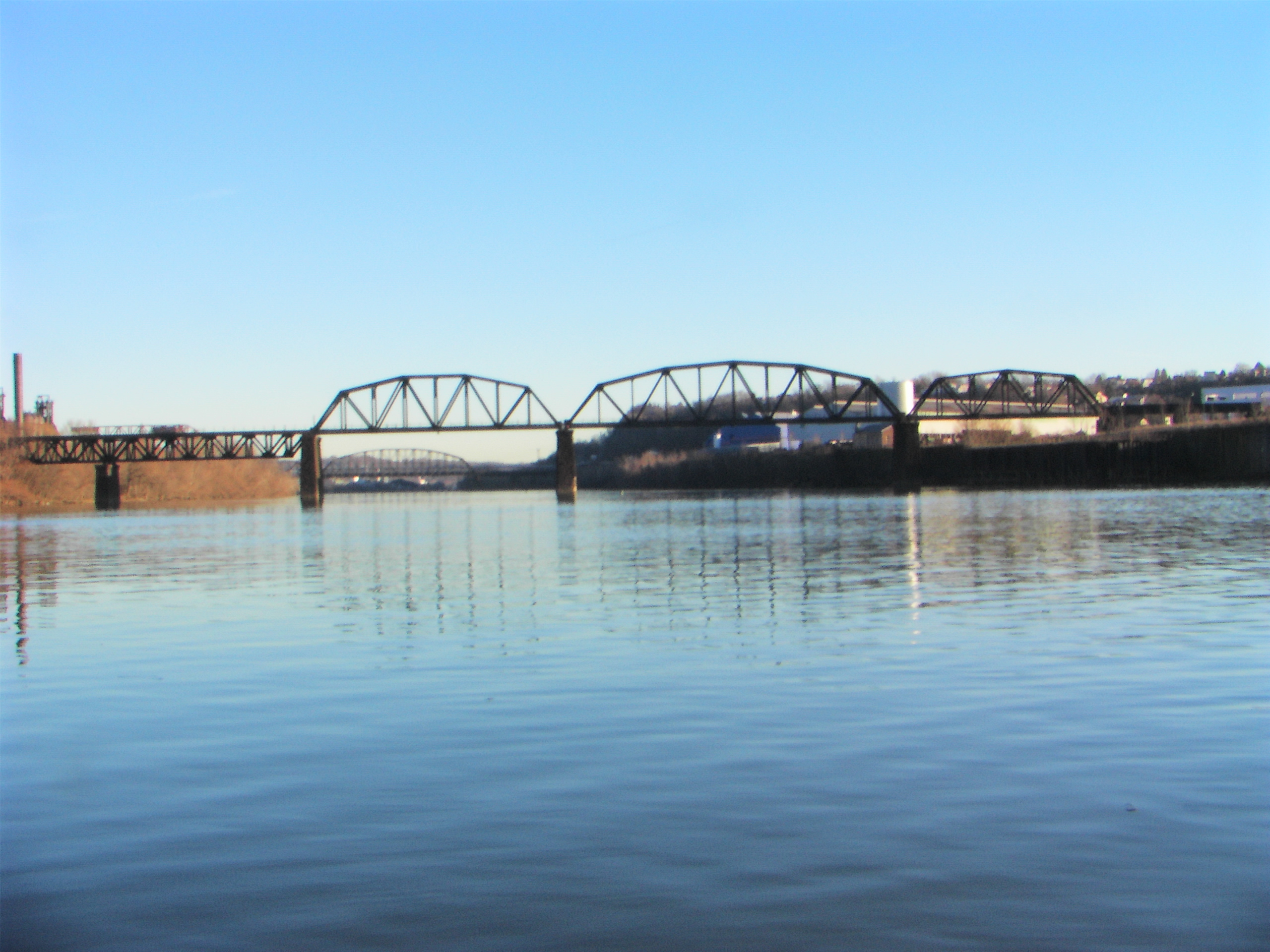
- Looking upriver with Munhall at right. Carrie Furnace visible at left and Carrie Furnace Hot Metal Bridge further upriver
- Coordinates: 40.4147°N 79.8968°W
- Carries: CSX Pittsburgh Subdivision
- Crosses: Monongahela River
- Locale: Munhall, Pennsylvania and Rankin, Pennsylvania
- Other name(s): Pittsburgh, McKeesport and Youghiogheny (Pemickey) Railroad Bridge; P&LE Railroad Bridge at Munhall

Characteristics
- Design: Truss bridge
- Longest span: 250 feet (76 m)
- Clearance below: 51.6 feet (15.7 m)

History
- Opened: 1883

The Pinkerton's Landing Bridge (officially known as the Pittsburgh & Lake Erie Railroad Bridge at Munhall) is a truss bridge that carries CSX Transportation's Pittsburgh Subdivision across the Monongahela River between Munhall, Pennsylvania and Rankin, Pennsylvania, United States. The structure's nickname references the 1892 Homestead strike.

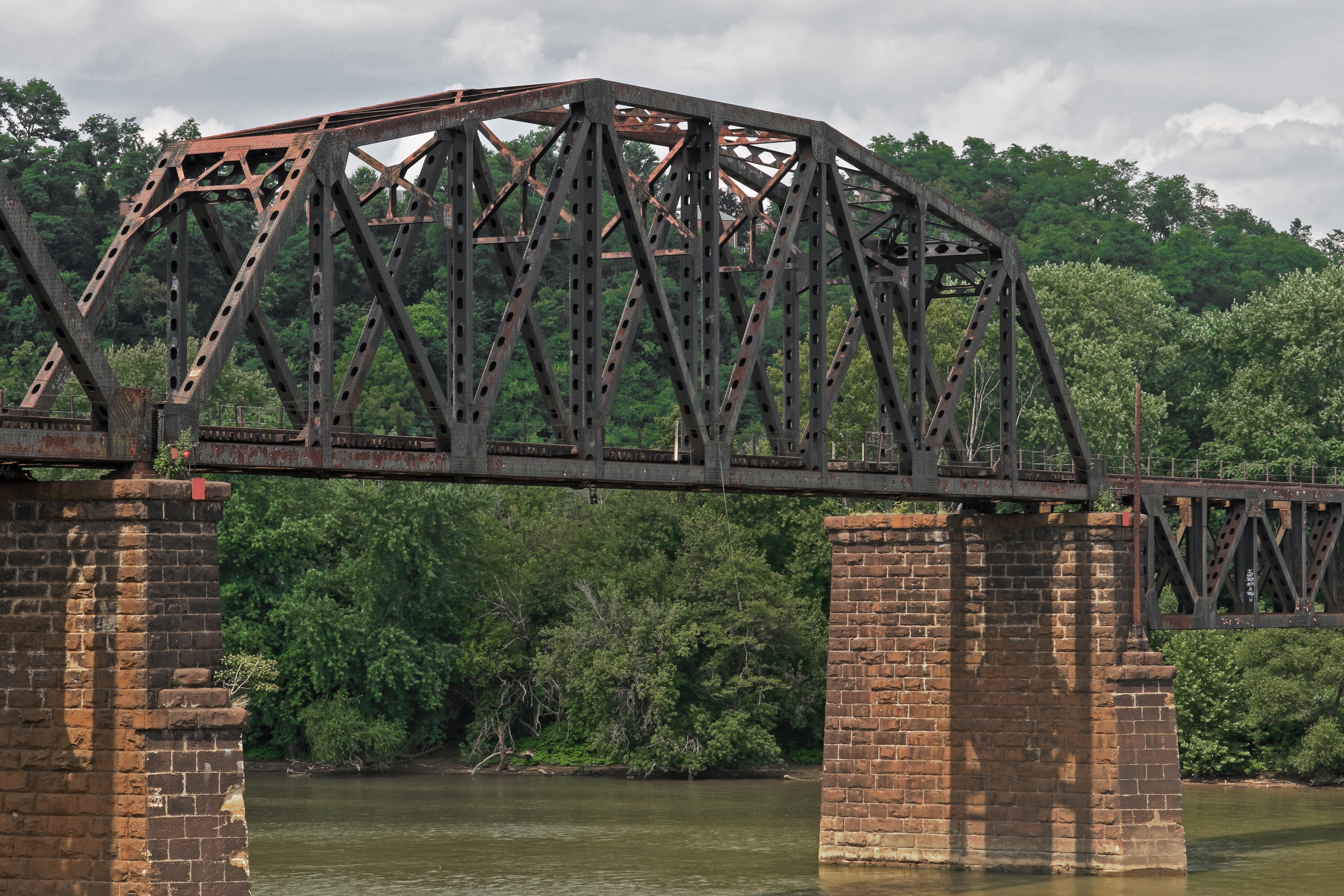
Detail of the Truss bridge architecture.

It is also known as the Pemickey Bridge, for the Pittsburgh, McKeesport and Youghiogheny Railroad (P. McK. & Y., pronounced "Pemickey") which used to run over the bridge.

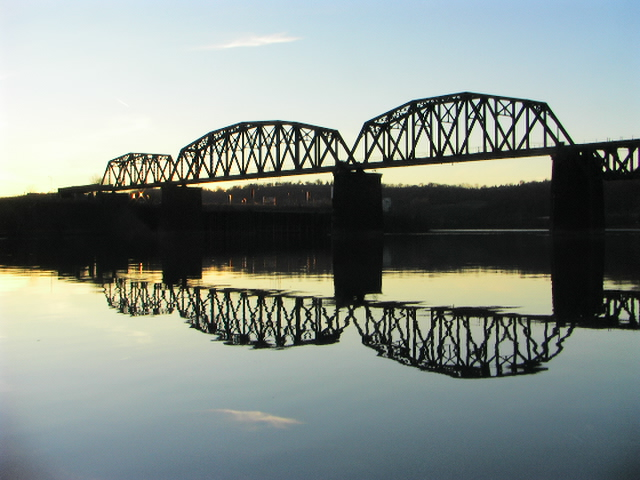
Looking downriver: Munhall at left

== See also ==
- Homestead Strike
- List of crossings of the Monongahela River
