= Homestead station =

Homestead
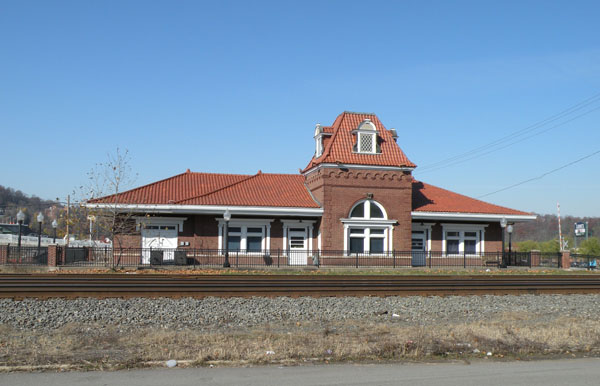

General information
- Line: Mon Line

Former services
Preceding station	Pennsylvania Railroad	Following station
Munhall toward Brownsville	Monongahela Division	Mesta toward Pittsburgh
- Homestead Pennsylvania Railroad Station
- U.S. National Register of Historic Places
- Location within Pennsylvania Location within the United States
- Location: Amity St., Homestead, Pennsylvania
- Coordinates: 40°24′29″N 79°54′47″W
- Area: 0.3 acres (0.12 ha)
- Built: 1906
- Architect: Pennsylvania Railroad Co.
- NRHP reference No.: 85003157
- Added to NRHP: December 26, 1985
Location

Homestead is a former railway station which is located in Homestead, Pennsylvania. It is now used by the Allegheny County District Attorney's office as a support and training facility.

== History and architectural features ==
Built in 1906 by the Pennsylvania Railroad, this station was added to the National Register of Historic Places on December 26, 1985, as the Homestead Pennsylvania Railroad Station.

Currently, the station is used by Allegheny County District Attorney's Office as its Regional Support and Training Center at the Waterfront.

== See also ==
- National Register of Historic Places listings in Allegheny County, Pennsylvania
