= Homestead, Pennsylvania =

Borough in Pennsylvania, United States

- Borough
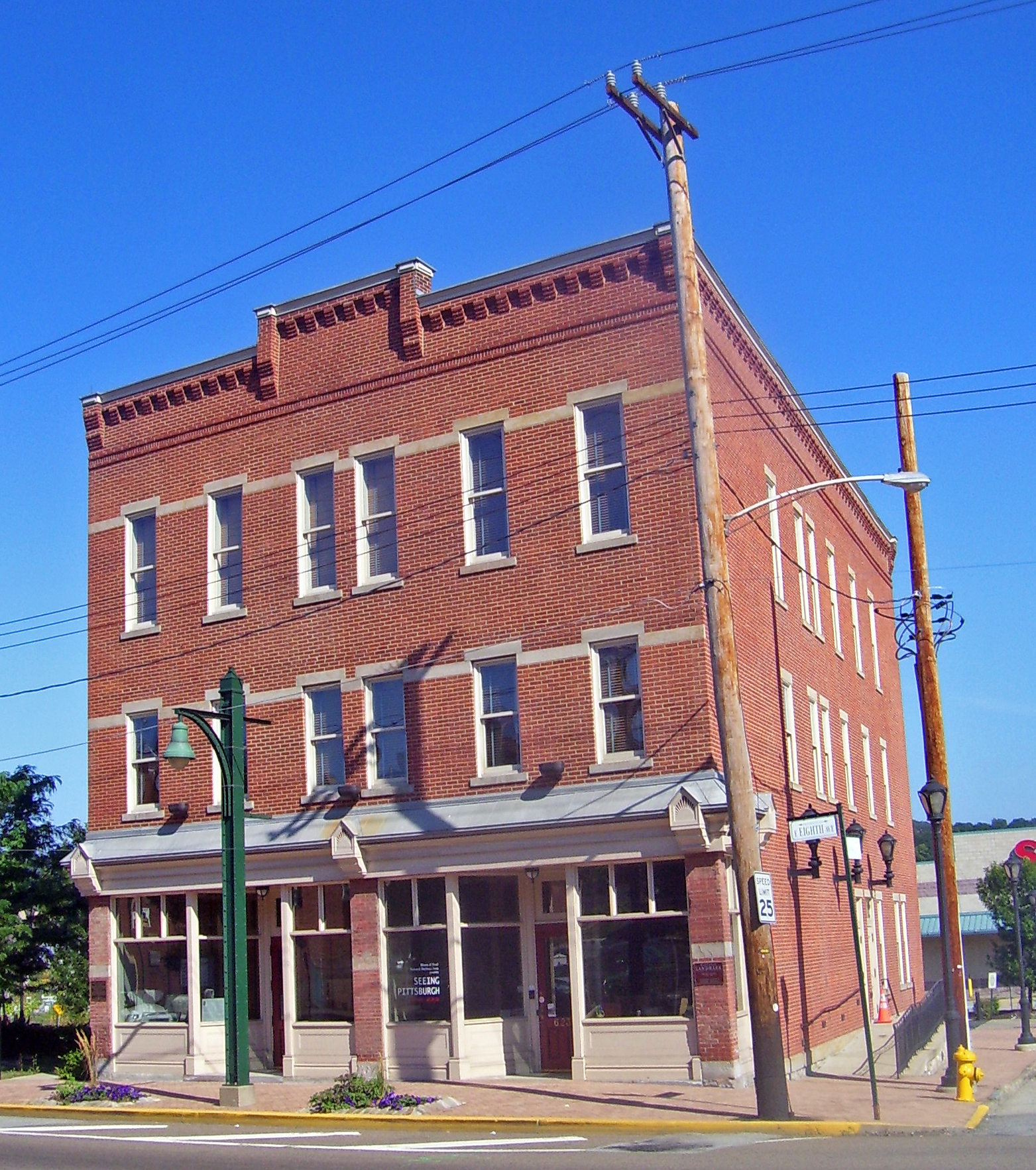
- The Bost Building, built in 1892, was AA union headquarters during the Homestead Strike that year, and today is a National Historic Landmark and museum of the Rivers of Steel National Heritage Area

- Seal
- Interactive map of Homestead, Pennsylvania
- Location within Pennsylvania Location within the United States
- Coordinates: 40°24′22″N 79°54′44″W
- Country: United States
- State: Pennsylvania
- County: Allegheny

Government
  - Mayor: Mary Nesby

Area
  - Total: 0.64 sq mi (1.66 km^{2})
  - Land: 0.58 sq mi (1.49 km^{2})
  - Water: 0.066 sq mi (0.17 km^{2})

Population (2020)
  - Total: 2,884
  - Density: 5,006.1/sq mi (1,932.88/km^{2})
- Time zone: UTC-5 (EST)
  - Summer (DST): UTC-4 (EDT)
- ZIP Code: 15120
- Area code: 412
- FIPS code: 42-35424
- Website: homesteadborough.com

Homestead is a borough in Allegheny County, Pennsylvania, United States, along the Monongahela River 7 miles (11 km) southeast of downtown Pittsburgh. The borough is known for the Homestead strike of 1892, an important event in the history of labor relations in the United States. Its population was 2,884 at the 2020 census. It is part of the Pittsburgh metropolitan area.

== History ==
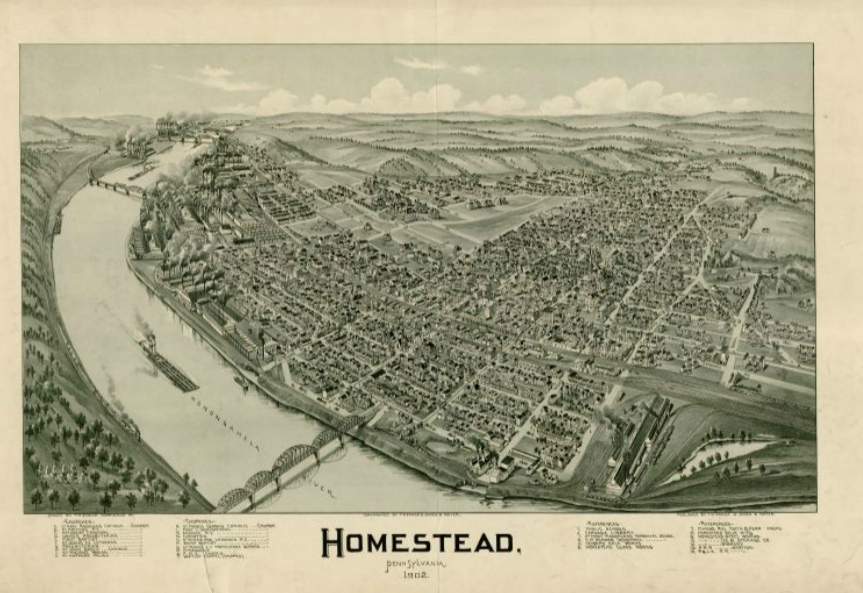
A 1902 map of Homestead

The area on the south bank of the Monongahela River now comprising the boroughs of Homestead, Munhall, and West Homestead saw the first white settlers arrive in the 1770s. About 100 years later, much of the existing farmland on the flats and hillsides by the river was purchased, laid out in lots and sold by local banks and landowners to create the town of Homestead. The town was chartered in 1880. The building of a railroad, glass factory, and in 1881 the first iron mill began a period of rapid growth and prosperity. In 1883, Andrew Carnegie bought out Homestead Steel Works, adding it to his empire of steel and coke enterprises. Carnegie had recently acquired a controlling interest in Henry Clay Frick's coke works on the Monongahela, setting the stage for the dramatic labor clash in Homestead.

Homestead gained international notoriety in July 1892 as the site of a violent clash between locked-out steelworkers and hired Pinkerton guards, known as the Homestead strike. When Henry Clay Frick, manager for Andrew Carnegie, owner of the local Homestead Steel Works, announced in the spring of 1892 that skilled workers would receive a reduction in wages, the advisory committee of the Amalgamated Association of Iron and Steel Workers refused to sign a new contract. Carnegie's management locked the workforce out, declaring that the union would no longer be recognized at the steel works.

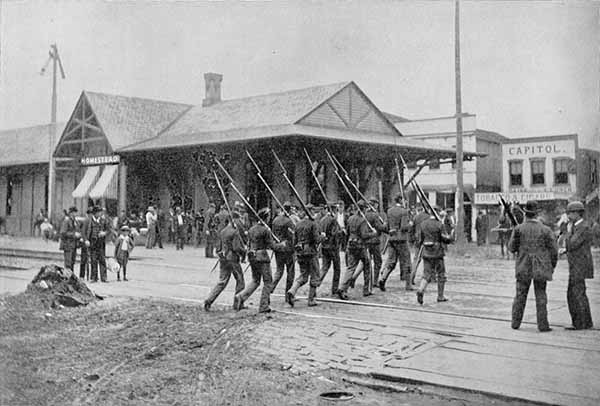
State militia passing the railroad station to disperse groups of strikers

To break the strike and secure the mill from the disgruntled workers, industrialist Frick hired hundreds of armed toughs from the Pinkerton National Detective Agency. When barges carrying the Pinkertons arrived at the mill on the morning of July 6, workers and townspeople met them at the riverbanks. Though eyewitness accounts differed on which side first fired a shot, a day-long armed battle ensued which resulted in 11 deaths and dozens of injuries. The governor of Pennsylvania eventually called out the National Guard to restore order to the town and take control of the mill. Frick successfully destroyed the union in Homestead, and by extension, in most of his other steel mills through the nation. The Battle of Homestead, as the event came to be known, represented a stunning setback for unionization in the highly mechanized steel industry. It also set the stage for the future steel strike of 1919, in which Homestead played an important role.

At the turn of the 20th century, in 1900, the population of Homestead was 12,554 people, of whom some 7,000 were employed in the plants. Due mostly to immigration from Eastern and Southern Europe, by 1910, the population jumped to 18,713, then to 20,452 in 1920. In the first decade of the 20th century, Homestead was studied as part of the sociological Pittsburgh Survey, the results of which were eventually published as Homestead: The Households of a Mill Town.

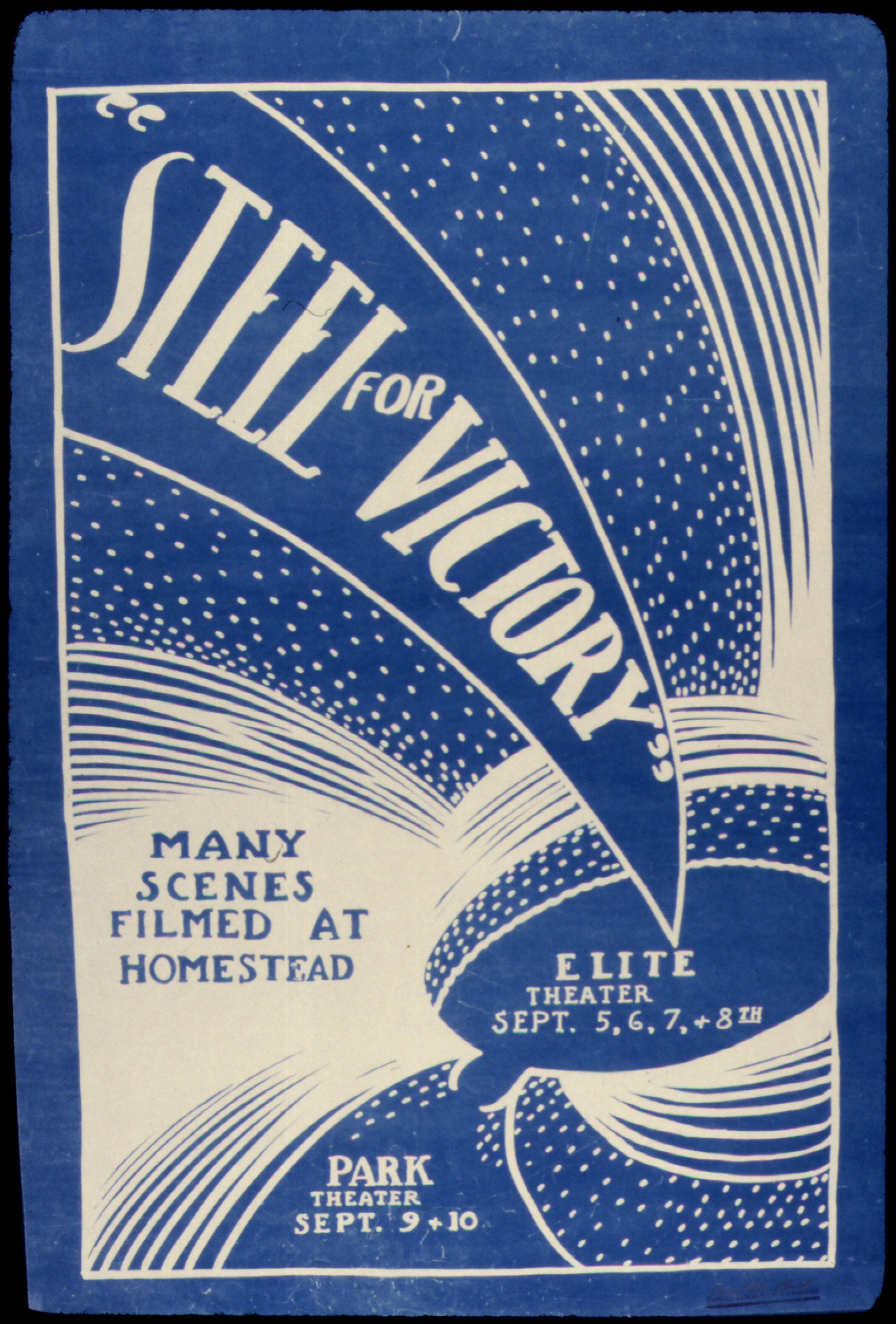
"Steel for Victory. Many scenes filmed at Homestead."

In 1940, 19,041 people lived in Homestead. During the early 1940s, half the population was displaced as the United States government added to the steel mills to have the capacity for armor plating for ships and tanks (preparing for World War II). After the end of the war, a decline in the steel-making industry of the United States took place.

By 1980, obtaining employment had become difficult at the Homestead Works, which was not producing much steel at that time. In 1986, the mill closed. The Homestead Works was demolished in the early 1990s, replaced in 1999 by The Waterfront shopping mall. As a direct result of the loss of mill employment, the number of people living in Homestead dwindled. By the time of the 2010 census, the borough population was 3,165. The borough began financially recovering in 2002, with an enlarging retail tax base.

== Geography ==
Homestead is located at 40°24′18″N 79°54′28″W (40.405069, −79.907785). According to the U.S. Census Bureau, the borough has a total area of 0.6 square miles (1.6 km^{2}), of which 0.6 square miles (1.6 km^{2}) is land and 0.1 square miles (0.26 km^{2}), or 11.11%, is covered by water.

=== Surrounding neighborhoods ===
Homestead has two land borders, including Munhall to the east and south, and West Homestead to the west. Across the Monongahela River to the north, Homestead runs adjacent with the Pittsburgh neighborhoods of Squirrel Hill South (direct connection via Homestead Grays Bridge) and Swisshelm Park.

== Demographics ==
Historical population
Census	Pop.	Note	%±
1880	592		—
1890	7,911		1,236.3%
1900	12,554		58.7%
1910	18,713		49.1%
1920	20,452		9.3%
1930	20,141		−1.5%
1940	19,041		−5.5%
1950	10,046		−47.2%
1960	7,502		−25.3%
1970	6,309		−15.9%
1980	5,092		−19.3%
1990	4,179		−17.9%
2000	3,569		−14.6%
2010	3,165		−11.3%
2020	2,884		−8.9%

=== Racial and ethnic composition ===
Homestead borough, Pennsylvania – Racial and ethnic composition Note: the US Census treats Hispanic/Latino as an ethnic category. This table excludes Latinos from the racial categories and assigns them to a separate category. Hispanics/Latinos may be of any race.
Race / Ethnicity (NH = Non-Hispanic)	Pop 2000	Pop 2010	Pop 2020	% 2000	% 2010	% 2020
White alone (NH)	1,512	1,015	804	42.36%	32.07%	27.88%
Black or African American alone (NH)	1,827	1,849	1,742	51.19%	58.42%	60.40%
Native American or Alaska Native alone (NH)	8	6	2	0.22%	0.19%	0.07%
Asian alone (NH)	99	96	54	2.77%	3.03%	1.87%
Native Hawaiian or Pacific Islander alone (NH)	1	0	0	0.03%	0.00%	0.00%
Other race alone (NH)	4	17	26	0.11%	0.54%	0.90%
Multiracial (NH)	96	124	162	2.69%	3.92%	5.62%
Hispanics or Latinos (any race)	22	58	94	0.62%	1.83%	3.26%
Total	3,569	3,165	2,884	100.00%	100.00%	100.00%

=== 2000 census ===
As of the 2000 census, 3,569 people, 1,607 households, and 843 families resided in the borough. The population density was 6,281.6 inhabitants per square mile (2,425.3/km^{2}). The 2,071 housing units had an average density of 3,645.0 per square mile (1,407.3/km^{2}). The racial makeup of the borough was 42.64% White, 51.30% African American, 0.25% Native American, 2.83% Asian, 0.03% Pacific Islander, 0.22% from other races, and 2.72% from two or more races. Hispanics or Latinos of any race were 0.62% of the population.

Of the 1,607 households, 24.4% had children under 18 living with them, 23.3% were married couples living together, 24.4% had a female householder with no husband present, and 47.5% were not families. About 42.5% of all households were made up of individuals, and 19.4% had someone living alone who was 65 or older. The average household size was 2.16, and the average family size was 2.99.

In the borough, the age distribution was 24.2% under of 18, 8.0% from 18 to 24, 25.1% from 25 to 44, 23.8% from 45 to 64, and 18.9% who were 65 or older. The median age was 40 years. For every 100 females, there were 80.1 males. For every 100 females 18 and over, there were 75.1 males.

The median income in the borough for a household was $16,603 and for a family was $28,314. Males had a median income of $25,500 versus $21,559 for females. The per capita income for the borough was $12,690. About 23.0% of families and 26.6% of the population were below the poverty line, including 31.0% of those under 18 and 16.8% of those 65 or over.

== Arts and culture ==
Much of Homestead and some of the surrounding communities are listed on the National Register of Historic Places as the Homestead Historic District, which encompasses the site of the Homestead Strike of 1892, when the Carnegie Steel Company, under the leadership of Henry Clay Frick, broke the Amalgamated Association of Iron and Steel Workers union. Of note is the Bost Building, a restored brick structure that served as headquarters for the strikers during the 1892 strike by workers at Carnegie Steel. The Bost Building was declared a national landmark in 1999 and now houses a museum related to the Rivers of Steel National Heritage Area.

The Carnegie Library of Homestead was opened to the public in 1898. It was the sixth library commissioned by Andrew Carnegie in the U.S. and the seventh to open. It is the third-oldest Carnegie library in continuous operation in its original structure in the U.S. after the Main Branch and Lawrenceville Branch of Pittsburgh.

The historic St Nicholas Carpatho-Rusyn Church, built in 1937, serves the local Rusyn community. Its domes were built using steel from local mills.

In 2000, Continental Real Estate Companies opened The Waterfront, a super-regional open-air shopping mall built on the former site of the Homestead Steel Works. Most of the structures associated with the steel mills on this site were demolished during construction, although some of the brick stacks from the mill still stand. In addition near the river, a former mill structure known as the Pump House was restored by the developer.

The Great Allegheny Passage, part of a shared-use path connecting Pittsburgh to Washington, DC, runs through the borough along the river.

== Government and politics ==
Presidential election results
Year	Republican	Democratic	Third parties
2020	13% 205	85% 1,276	0.7% 11
2016	11% 166	87% 1,270	4% 23
2012	8% 129	91% 1,396	1% 5

== Transportation ==
An important state route, Pennsylvania Route 837, runs through Homestead. Interstate 376 is only a few miles away from Homestead. For public transit, the Port Authority of Allegheny County has several bus routes running through Homestead that go to downtown Pittsburgh and to McKeesport.

Homestead is served by three railroads: Norfolk Southern, CSX Transportation, and Union Railroad. All three used to have large operations when the Homestead steel mill was open. Now that the mill has closed, only one company, WHEMCO, is served by the railroad. The Union Railroad had a large yard to serve the Homestead Works, which is now Waterfront Drive.

== Notable people ==
- Charlie Batch, NFL player
- William Campbell, business executive
- John S. Crawford, member of the Wisconsin State Assembly
- Betty Davis, singer, songwriter, and model
- Mary Dee, radio personality and disc jockey
- Nora Barry Fischer, U.S. district judge
- Jeff Goldblum, actor
- Jester Hairston, composer, choral conductor and actor
- Orrin Hatch, President pro tempore of the United States Senate
- Mark R. Hornak, U.S. district judge
- Butch Leitzinger, race car driver
- Curt Leskanic, MLB player
- Frank McHugh, actor
- Joe Mihal, NFL player
- Ed Piskor, alternative comics artist
- Cumberland Posey, member of Baseball and Basketball Halls of Fame
- John Rice, MLB umpire
- Maxine Sullivan, jazz singer
- Jim Tomsula, NFL head coach
- Tamara Tunie, actress
- Joe Zuger, NFL and CFL player

== Gallery ==
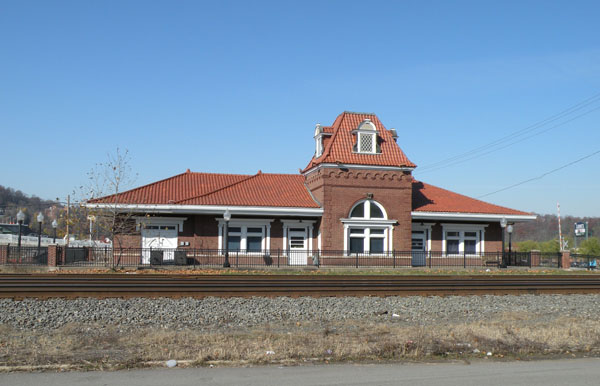
Homestead Pennsylvania Railroad Station, built circa 1890, on Amity Street in Homestead

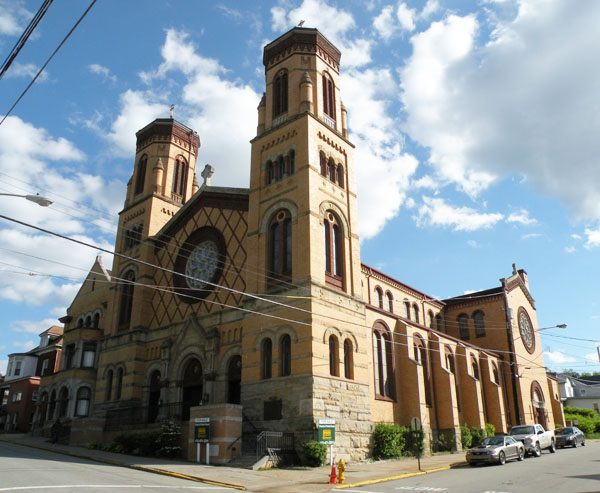
St. Mary Magdalene Church, built 1895, at 1008 Amity Street in Homestead

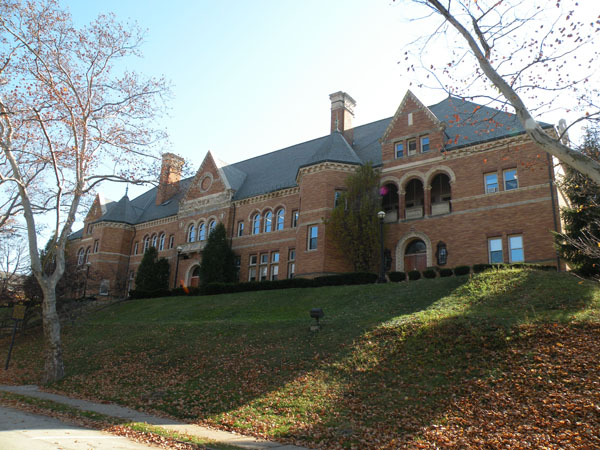
Carnegie Library of Homestead, built from 1896 to 1898, located in the Homestead Historic District in Munhall

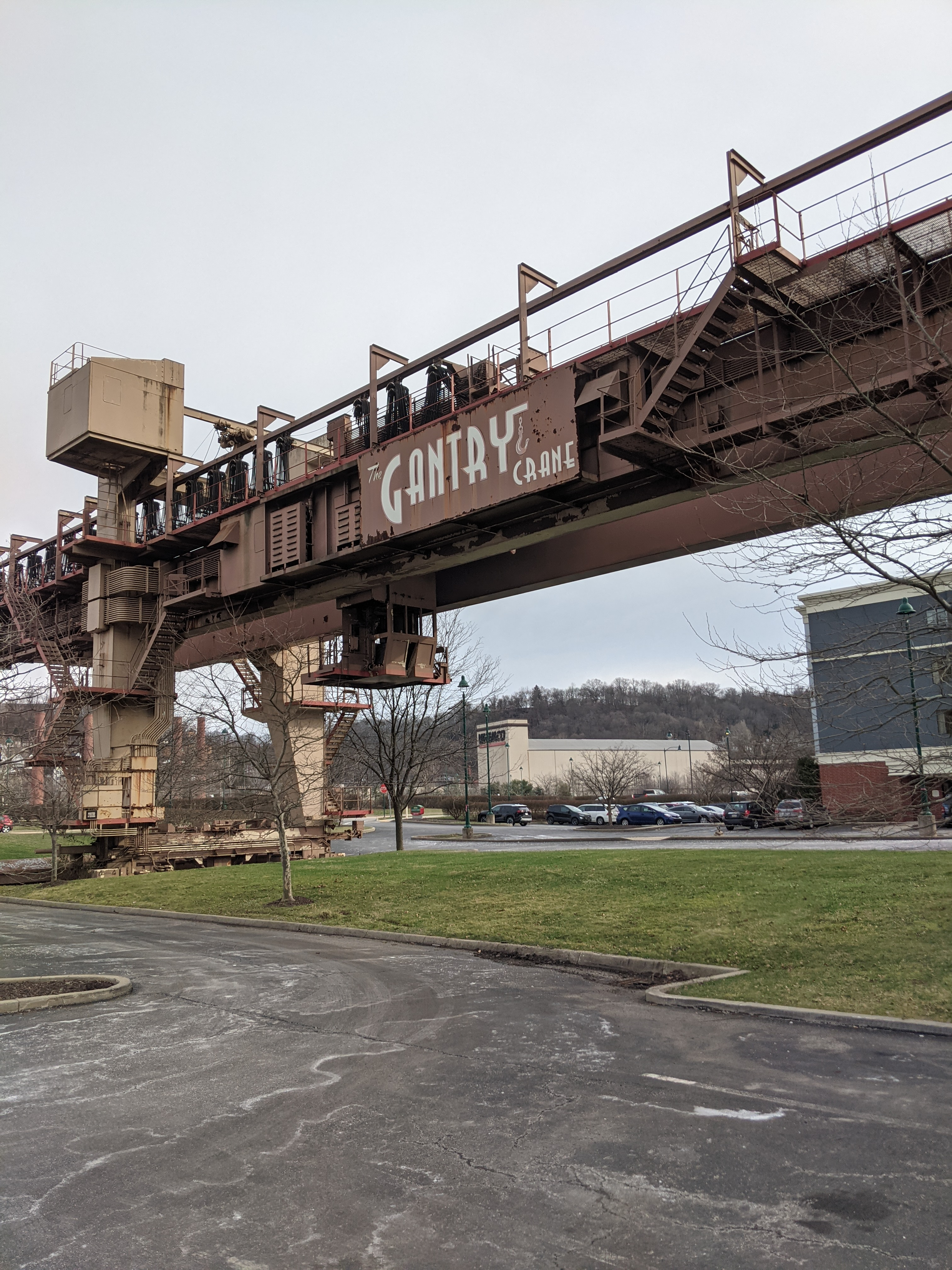
Gantry crane at the site of Homestead Steel Works
