= New Homestead =

Neighborhood in Pittsburgh, United States

- Neighborhood of Pittsburgh
- Coordinates: 40.387°N 79.924°W
- Country: United States
- State: Pennsylvania
- County: Allegheny County
- City: Pittsburgh

Area
  - Total: 0.794 sq mi (2.06 km^{2})

Population (2010)
  - Total: 990
  - Density: 1,200/sq mi (480/km^{2})

New Homestead is a neighborhood in the 31st Ward of Pittsburgh, Pennsylvania, USA's southeast city area. It is near to the Monongahela river. It has a ZIP Code of 15207 and 15120. It is represented on the Pittsburgh City Council by Barb Warwick.

== Surrounding communities ==
New Homestead has four borders, including the Pittsburgh neighborhoods of Hays to the west and southwest and Lincoln Place to the south, and the boroughs of Munhall to the east and West Homestead to the north, northeast and east.

== See also ==
- List of Pittsburgh neighborhoods
