= Walker Homestead Historic District =

Historic district in Arkansas, United States

- U.S. National Register of Historic Places
- U.S. Historic district
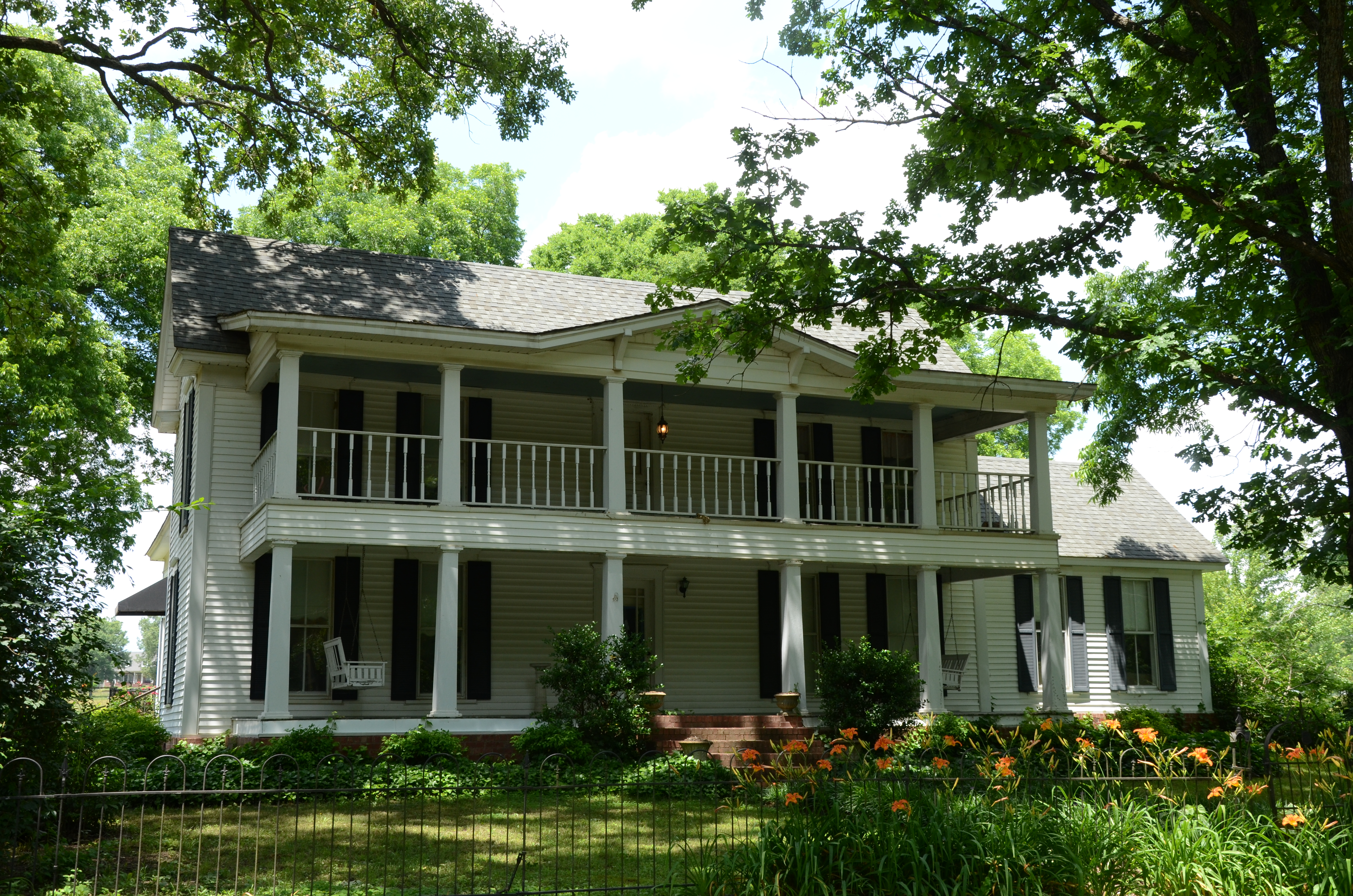

- Location within Arkansas Location within the United States
- Nearest city: Garner, Arkansas
- Coordinates: 35°11′16″N 91°46′35″W
- Area: 8 acres (3.2 ha)
- Architectural style: Dogtrot;I-house
- MPS: White County MPS
- NRHP reference No.: 91001351
- Added to NRHP: July 20, 1992

The Walker Homestead Historic District encompasses a collection of related agricultural and homesteading properties in rural White County, Arkansas. Located on Gum Spring Road about 1 mile (1.6 km) east of Arkansas Highway 267 southwest of Searcy, the district includes two farmstead houses, a barn, tenant housing, cotton gin, and other features. The oldest portion of the oldest house is a single pen log structure built about 1850 by William Walker, one of the area's early settlers, while the other house is a c. 1900 vernacular Greek Revival structure built by Billy Walker, Sr. The district encapsulates a typical evolutionary history of rural properties in the region, and was listed on the National Register of Historic Places in 1992.

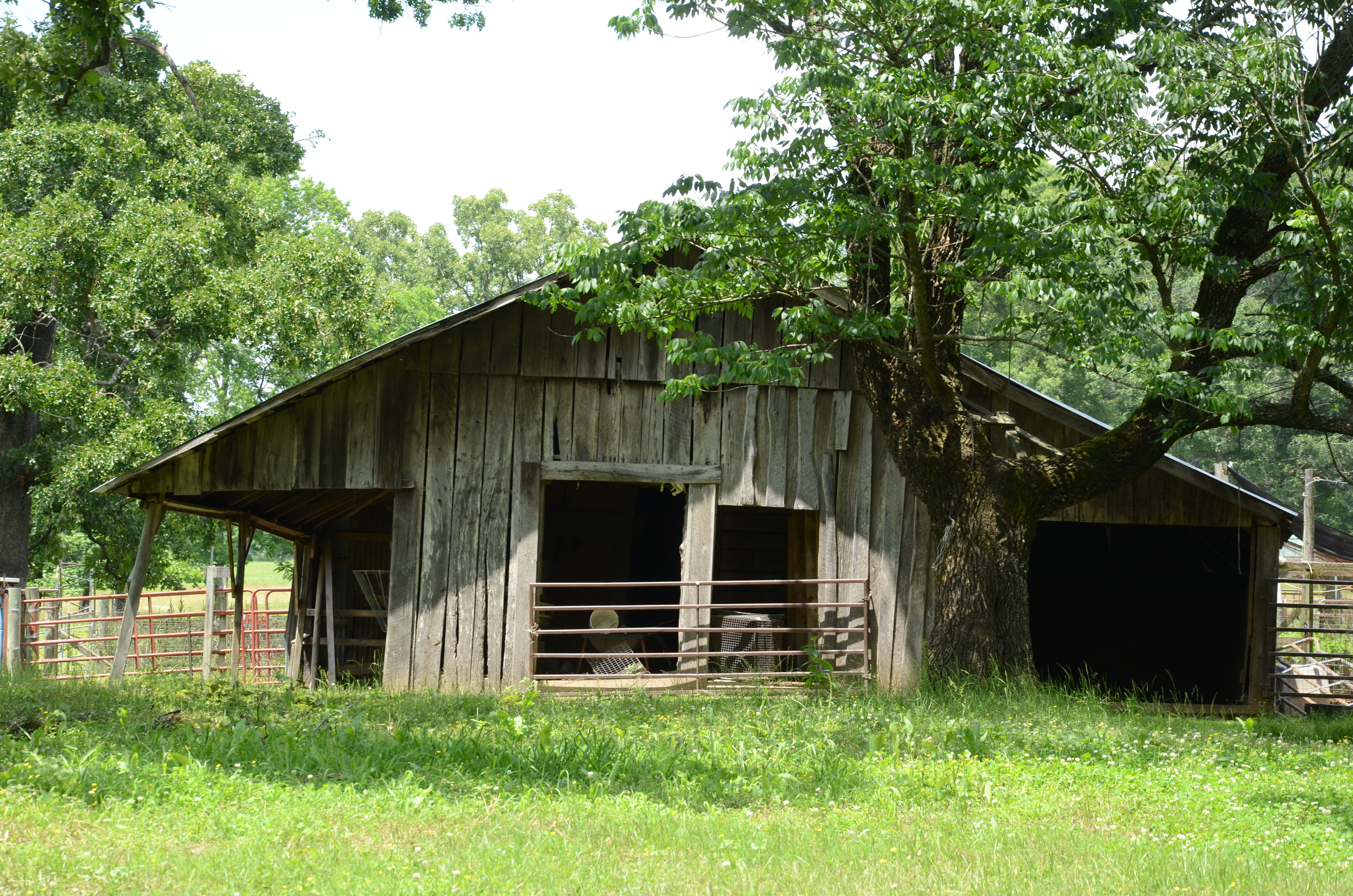
Walker Homestead Historic District, Cotton Seed Barn

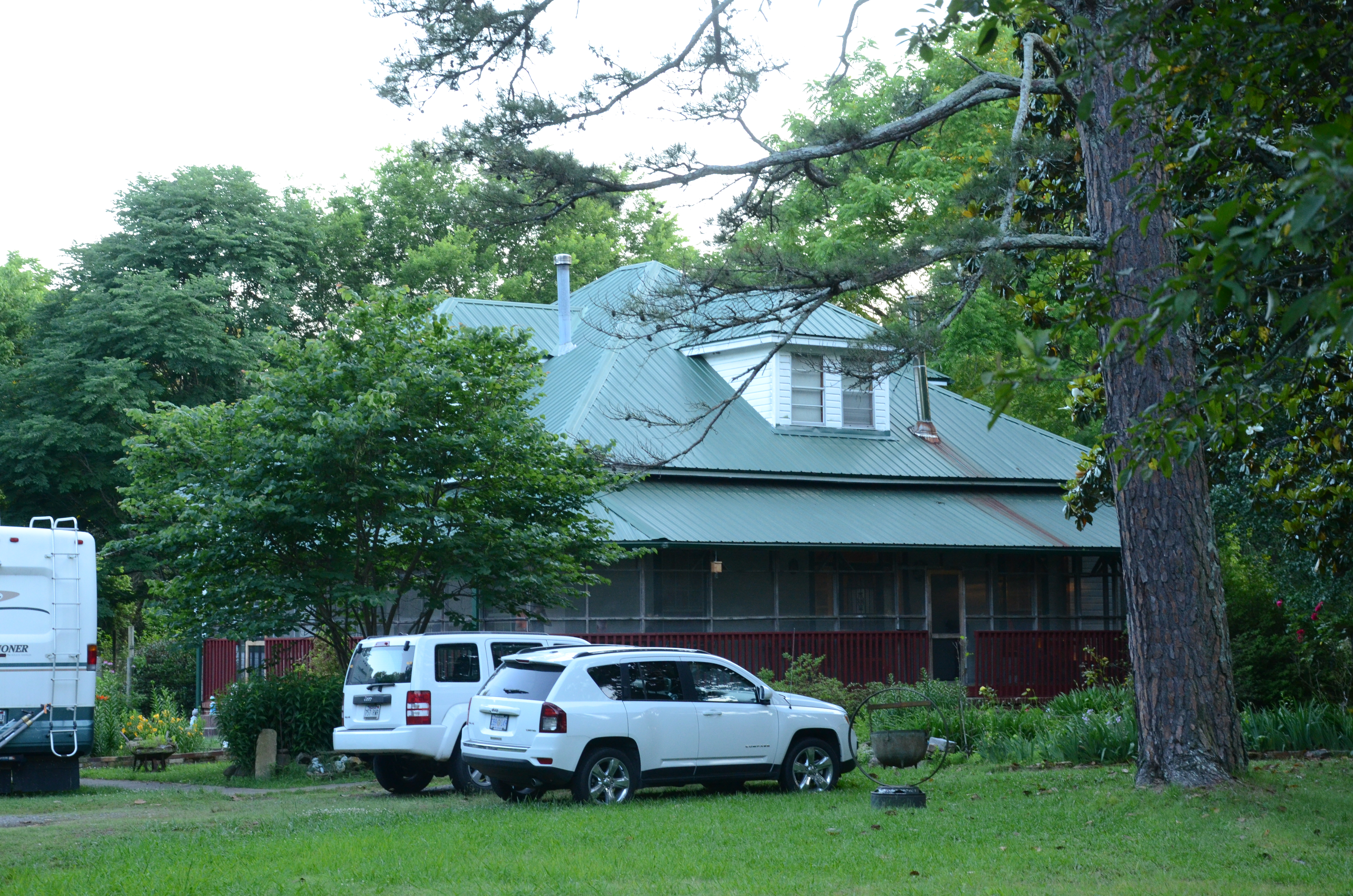
Otha Walker Homestead

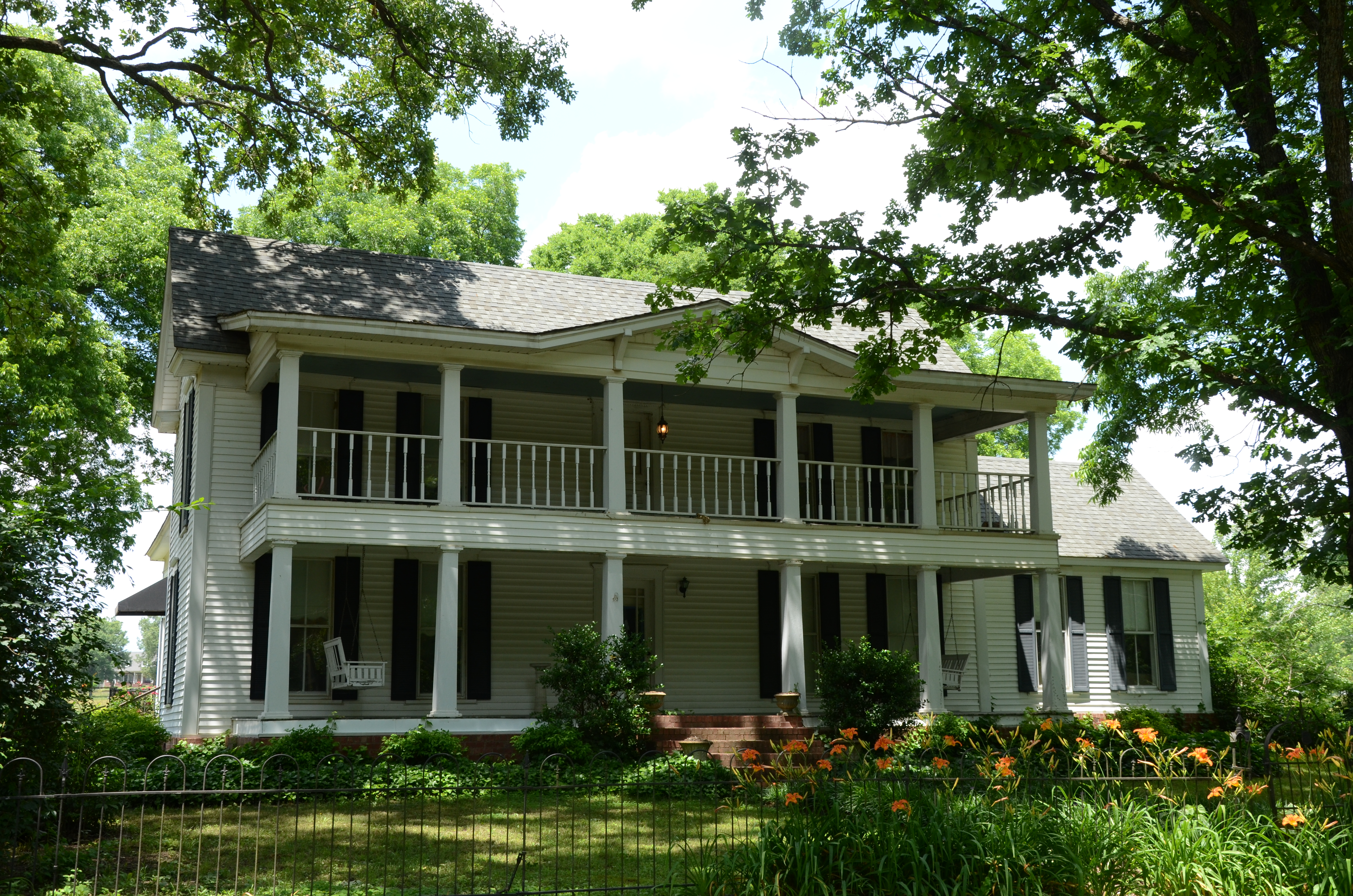
Walker Homestead Historic District, Billy Walker House

== See also ==
- National Register of Historic Places listings in White County, Arkansas
