= West Homestead, Pennsylvania =

Borough in Pennsylvania, US

- Borough
- Borough of West Homestead
- Location in Allegheny County and the U.S. state of Pennsylvania.
- Coordinates: 40°23′40″N 79°54′55″W
- Country: United States
- State: Pennsylvania
- County: Allegheny

Government
  - Mayor: Joe Baran
  - Council President: Ashley Cain
  - Council VP: Ray Fonos
  - Council Members: Ashley Cain; Chris Deasy; Ray Fonos; Benjie Hadburg; Dave Harhai; John Karafa; Lynn Nikolas
  - Manager: Cindy L Bahn, Interim

Area
  - Total: 1.01 sq mi (2.62 km^{2})
  - Land: 0.92 sq mi (2.39 km^{2})
  - Water: 0.093 sq mi (0.24 km^{2})

Population (2020)
  - Total: 1,872
  - Density: 2,021.8/sq mi (780.64/km^{2})
- Time zone: UTC-5 (Eastern (EST))
  - Summer (DST): UTC-4 (EDT)
- ZIP codes: 15120
- Area code: 412
- FIPS code: 42-83200
- Website: westhomesteadpa.com

West Homestead is a borough in Allegheny County, Pennsylvania, United States, 8 miles (13 km) southeast of Pittsburgh, on the Monongahela River. Heavy industries associated with nearby steel mills existed here, such as axle works, brickworks, and manufactories of machinery, car wheels, etc. The largest concern was Mesta Machinery, which was one of the world's leading industrial manufacturers from 1898 until 1983. The population was 1,872 at the 2020 census.

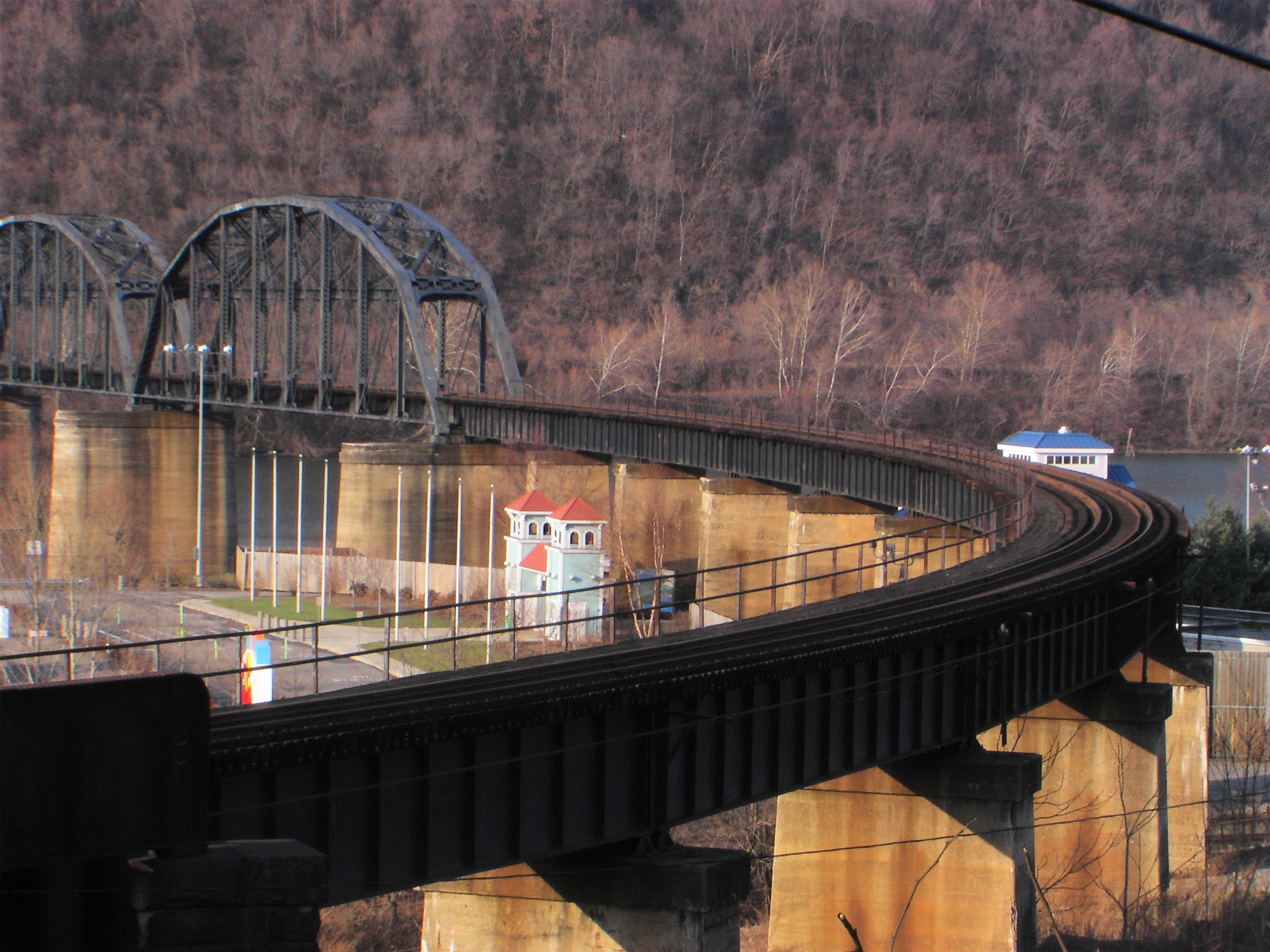
AVRR bridge across the Monongahela River

== History ==
There are two primary residential communities in West Homestead: the historic district and the Village, a post-World War II hilltop community. The historic district consists of a series of hillside residential streets adorned by intact working-class houses reflecting the architecture of the late nineteenth and early twentieth century period when Homestead first flourished.

West Homestead's historic district includes Doyle Ave, originally home to several notable glass manufacturing company owners. The homes of William Beck and Joseph Doyle, who co-founded Doyle & Co Glass, are both excellent examples of late Italianate architecture. The ruins of the Bryce house are still visible, home of the founder of Bryce Brothers, Doyle & Co's main competitor. By the 1890s, their separate companies joined United States Glass Company, and the street became home to steel and machinery workers and their management.

Among this second wave of entrepreneurial owners, one noteworthy structure is the Mesta Mansion, which is on the National Register of Historic Places and considered the cornerstone of the district. Built in 1900 by machining engineer and magnate George Mesta, founder of Mesta Machinery, he expanded and renovated the home extensively in 1916 to welcome his bride, the celebrated socialite and political hostess Perle Mesta. After Mesta's death in 1925, by 1932 new owners split the mansion into apartments, a fate shared by several of its neighbors during the Great Depression and after.

Fortunately, today the Mesta Mansion continues to stand alongside its neighbors on the historic street, including the Beck-Kelly Estate (1867), the Doyle-Smith House (1872), the Wahr-Siebert House (1887), and the Mesta-Martin House (1898).

Another feature of the historic district is the Bulgarian Macedonian National Educational and Cultural Center on West Eighth Avenue. Since 1935, this facility has continued to be the center of Bulgarian and Macedonian cultural activity in Western Pennsylvania. West Homestead's Eighth Avenue itself is a tree-lined boulevard adorned by Victorian shops, also on the National Register of Historic Places, and the neighborhood is surrounded by the largest group of ethnic churches on the National Register.

== Geography ==
West Homestead is located at 40°23′40″N 79°54′55″W (40.394369, −79.915224).

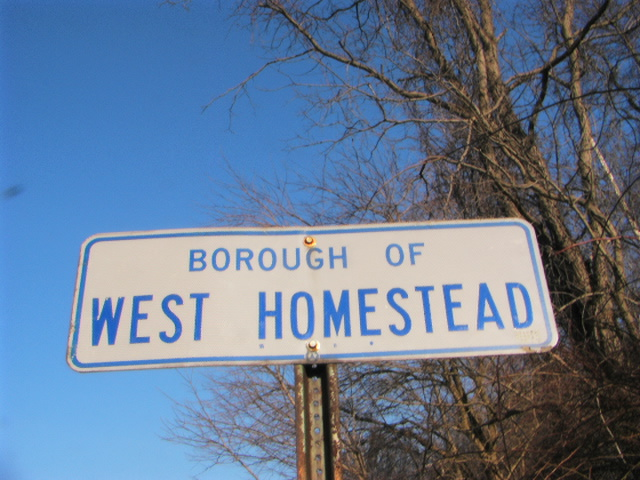

According to the United States Census Bureau, the borough has a total area of 1.0 square mile (2.6 km^{2}), of which 0.9 square miles (2.3 km^{2}) is land and 0.1 square miles (0.26 km^{2}), or 9.90%, is water.

== Surrounding and adjacent neighborhoods ==
- North – Hazelwood (a Pittsburgh neighborhood) via Glenwood Bridge across the Monongahela River
- North east – Homestead (an Allegheny county borough)
- South east – Munhall (an Allegheny county borough)
- South west – New Homestead (a Pittsburgh neighborhood)
- West – Hays (a Pittsburgh neighborhood)

== Attractions ==
In 2000, Continental Realestate Companies opened The Waterfront. This large "LifeStyle" shopping center was built on the former site of the US Steel Works. Most of the structures associated with the steel mills on this site were demolished during construction. Still standing in the Waterfront development are some of the brick stacks from the Homestead Steel Works. In addition, near the river is a former mill structure known as the Pump House which was restored by the developer.

Sandcastle Waterpark is a waterpark that has 14 water slides and 3 speed slides and the newest addition the Blue Tooba Looba.

There are two parks located in West Homestead: Calhoun Community Park (Located off of Fieldstone Drive) and Eighth Avenue Playground (Located next to West Homestead Volunteer Fire Department, entrance on Eighth Avenue). For park rules and hours visit westhomesteadpa.com/assets/files/forms/rules_and_regulations.pdf.

The Great Allegheny Passage, part of a shared-use path connecting Pittsburgh to Washington, D.C., runs through the borough parallel to the river.

== Government and politics ==
Presidential election results
Year	Republican	Democratic	Third parties
2020	47% 520	51% 567	0.9% 10
2016	47% 473	52% 531	1% 8
2012	42% 424	57% 573	1% 8

== Demographics ==
Historical population
Census	Pop.	Note	%±
1910	3,009		—
1920	3,435		14.2%
1930	3,552		3.4%
1940	3,526		−0.7%
1950	3,257		−7.6%
1960	4,155		27.6%
1970	3,789		−8.8%
1980	3,128		−17.4%
1990	2,495		−20.2%
2000	2,197		−11.9%
2010	1,929		−12.2%
2020	1,872		−3.0%

=== Racial and ethnic composition ===
West Homestead borough, Pennsylvania – Racial and ethnic composition Note: the US Census treats Hispanic/Latino as an ethnic category. This table excludes Latinos from the racial categories and assigns them to a separate category. Hispanics/Latinos may be of any race.
Race / Ethnicity (NH = Non-Hispanic)	Pop 2000	Pop 2010	Pop 2020	% 2000	% 2010	% 2020
White alone (NH)	1,961	1,612	1,474	89.26%	83.57%	78.74%
Black or African American alone (NH)	189	248	249	8.60%	12.86%	13.30%
Native American or Alaska Native alone (NH)	4	1	0	0.18%	0.05%	0.00%
Asian alone (NH)	12	8	9	0.55%	0.41%	0.48%
Native Hawaiian or Pacific Islander alone (NH)	0	0	1	0.00%	0.00%	0.05%
Other race alone (NH)	0	1	10	0.00%	0.05%	0.53%
Mixed race or Multiracial (NH)	19	42	84	0.86%	2.18%	4.49%
Hispanic or Latino (any race)	12	17	45	0.55%	0.88%	2.40%
Total	2,197	1,929	1,872	100.00%	100.00%	100.00%

=== 2000 census ===
As of the 2000 census, there were 2,197 people, 956 households, and 623 families residing in the borough. The population density was 2,408.9 inhabitants per square mile (930.1/km^{2}). There were 1,106 housing units at an average density of 1,212.7 per square mile (468.2/km^{2}). The racial makeup of the borough was 89.53% White, 8.83% African American, 0.18% Native American, 0.55% Asian, 0.05% from other races, and 0.86% from two or more races. Hispanic or Latino of any race were 0.55% of the population.

There were 956 households, out of which 22.9% had children under the age of 18 living with them, 47.3% were married couples living together, 12.9% had a female householder with no husband present, and 34.8% were non-families. 30.4% of all households were made up of individuals, and 13.2% had someone living alone who was 65 years of age or older. The average household size was 2.30 and the average family size was 2.87.

In the borough the population was spread out, with 21.0% under the age of 18, 5.1% from 18 to 24, 25.4% from 25 to 44, 24.9% from 45 to 64, and 23.6% who were 65 years of age or older. The median age was 44 years. For every 100 females, there were 88.6 males. For every 100 females age 18 and over, there were 89.2 males.

The median income for a household in the borough was $33,309, and the median income for a family was $44,338. Males had a median income of $35,033 versus $27,700 for females. The per capita income for the borough was $17,327. About 9.2% of families and 13.7% of the population were below the poverty line, including 20.6% of those under age 18 and 5.5% of those age 65 or over.

== Notable people ==
- Jeff Goldblum, actor

== See also ==
- Homestead, Pennsylvania

Preceded by Munhall	Bordering communities of Pittsburgh	Succeeded by Swissvale
