= MacFarlane Homestead Historic District =

Historic district in Florida, United States

- U.S. National Register of Historic Places
- U.S. Historic district
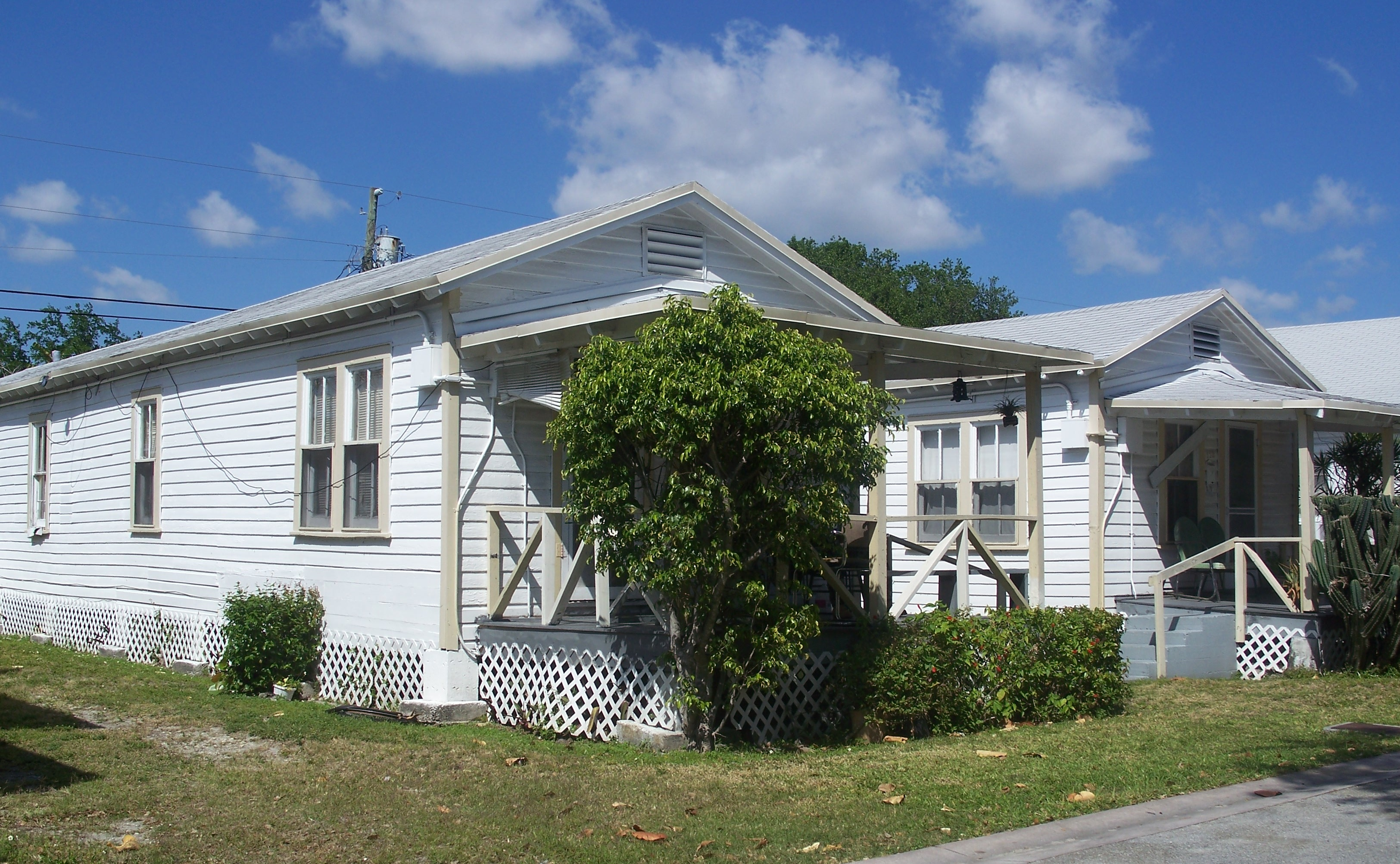
- A house in the MacFarlane Homestead Historic District in Coral Gables, Florida, March 2011

- Location within Miami Location within Florida Location within the United States
- Location: Coral Gables, Florida
- Coordinates: 25°43′40″N 80°15′32″W
- Area: 40 acres (160,000 m^{2})
- NRHP reference No.: 94000533
- Added to NRHP: May 26, 1994

The MacFarlane Homestead Historic District is a U.S. historic district (designated as such on May 26, 1994) located in Coral Gables, Florida. The district is bounded by Jefferson Street, Frow Avenue, Brooker Street and Grand Avenue. It contains 32 historic buildings.

The district is named after Flora McFarlane (the "Mac" in the official district name is apparently an error), the area's first solo female homesteader and its first schoolteacher. McFarlane, born in New Jersey to British parents, settled 160 acres in the area beginning on March 16, 1891. Her home site, located where present-day Douglas Road and Day Avenue meet, no longer exists.

In 1925, Flora McFarlane sold the 20 acres that today constitute the historic district to Coral Gables founder George Merrick's company, which turned it into a city subdivision. Many Bahamian immigrant laborers, particularly Afro-Bahamians, subsequently built homes there.
