= Homestead Steel Works =

Steel works in Pennsylvania, United States

Coordinates: 40°24′40″N 79°53′50″W

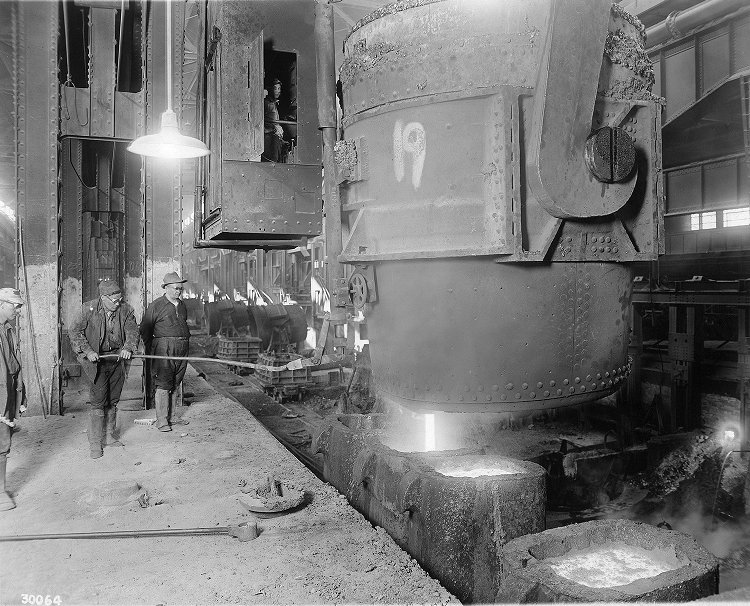
Steel workers gaze on as molten steel is poured from ladle to casts at Homestead Steel Works.

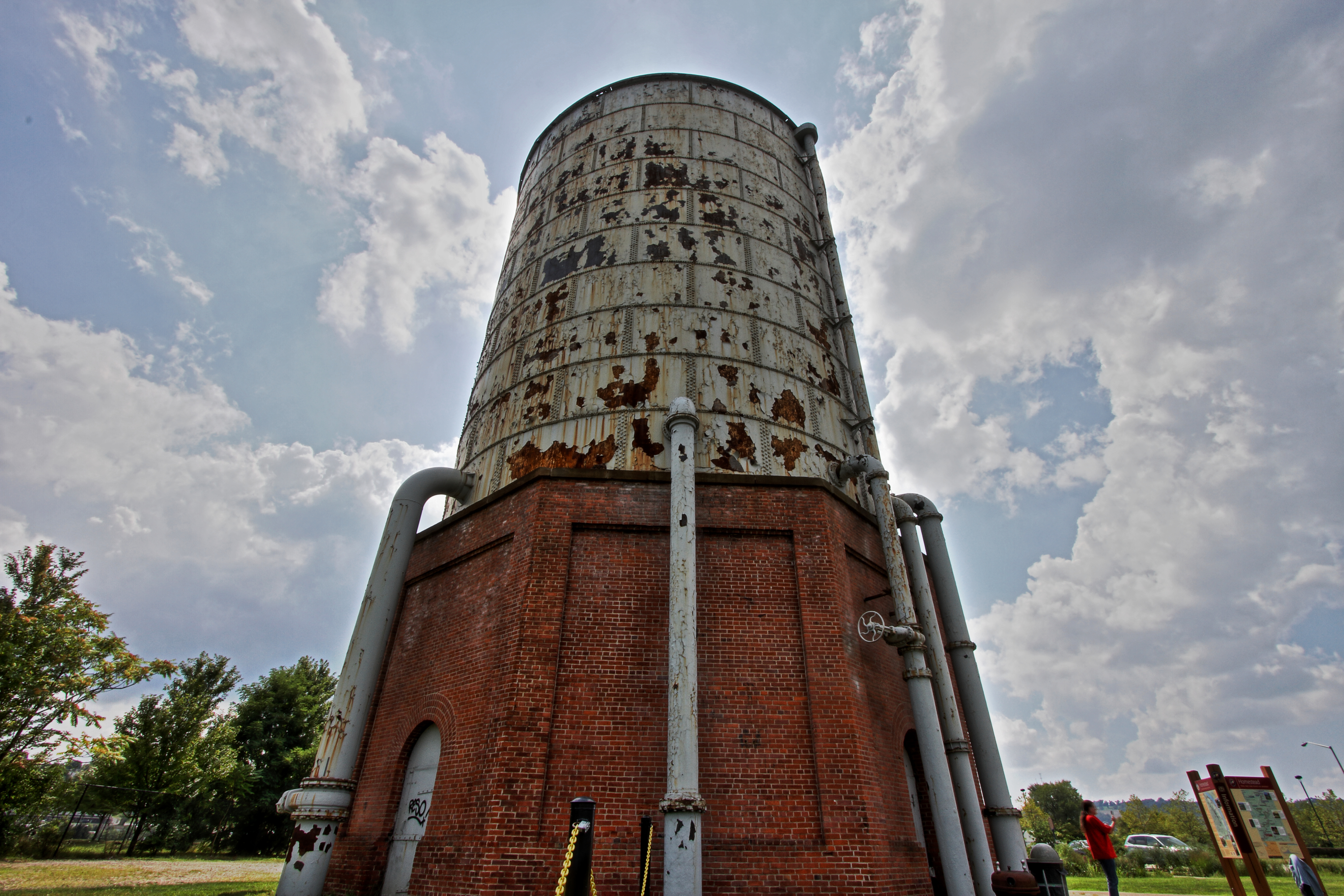
The water tower of the pumphouse is one of the few structures remaining from the 1800s. Now, it provides restrooms within for visitors and cyclists traveling on the Great Allegheny Passage trail.

Homestead Steel Works was a large steel mill located on the Monongahela River at Homestead, Pennsylvania, in the United States. Originally built for the Pittsburgh Bessemer Steel Company, the plant expanded rapidly following its purchase by Andrew Carnegie in 1883. Like the neighboring Edgar Thomson Works, it was supplied by tributary coal and iron fields, the Union Railroad 425 miles (684 km) long, and a line of lake steamships. The works also saw one of the most notable labor disputes in U.S. history, the Homestead strike of 1892. "Homestead 1889-1895".

== History ==
The steel works were first constructed in 1881. Steel tycoon Andrew Carnegie bought the 2 year old Homestead Steel Works in 1883, and integrated it into his Carnegie Steel Company. For many years, the Homestead Works was the largest steel mill in the world and the most productive of the Mon Valley's many mills.

A series of industrial disputes over wages, working hours and contracts occurred in the early years of the works, leading to the Homestead strike, an industrial lockout and strike which began on June 30, 1892, culminating in a battle between strikers and private security agents on July 6, 1892. The battle was one of the most violent disputes in U.S. labor history, ending in a major defeat for the union, setting back their efforts to unionize steelworkers.

In 1896, Carnegie built the Carnegie Library of Homestead in nearby Munhall as part of concessions to the striking workers. (This however has never been validated. Carnegie had the plans drawn up in the late 1880s, and run-ins with the Union bosses kept him from actually building it.)

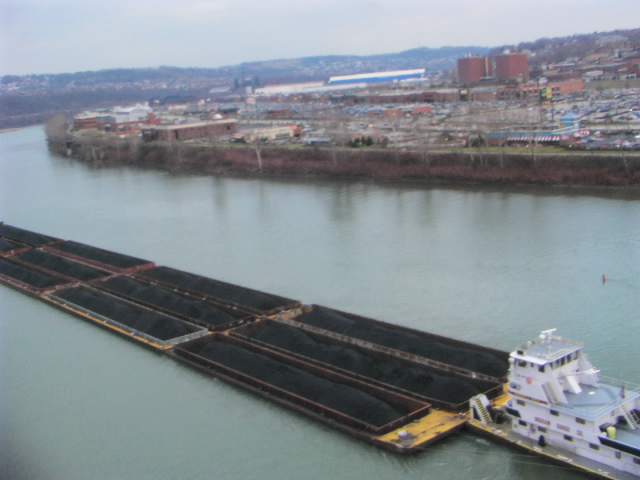
Barge and The Waterfront shopping center

In 1901, Carnegie sold his operations to U.S. Steel. On January 6, 1906 it was announced that the company would undergo upgrades and expansions worth seven million dollars ($262 million as of 2026) The workforce peaked at 15,000 during World War II. William J. Gaughan was a Senior Designer of Operations Planning and Control at the company who developed computer systems to aid in automation of various operations. Throughout his management career, Gaughan had developed an interest in the history of Homestead Steel Works and began to collect photos and pamphlets regarding the company. The plant closed in 1986 because of a severe downturn in the domestic steel industry, from which the industry still has not recovered.

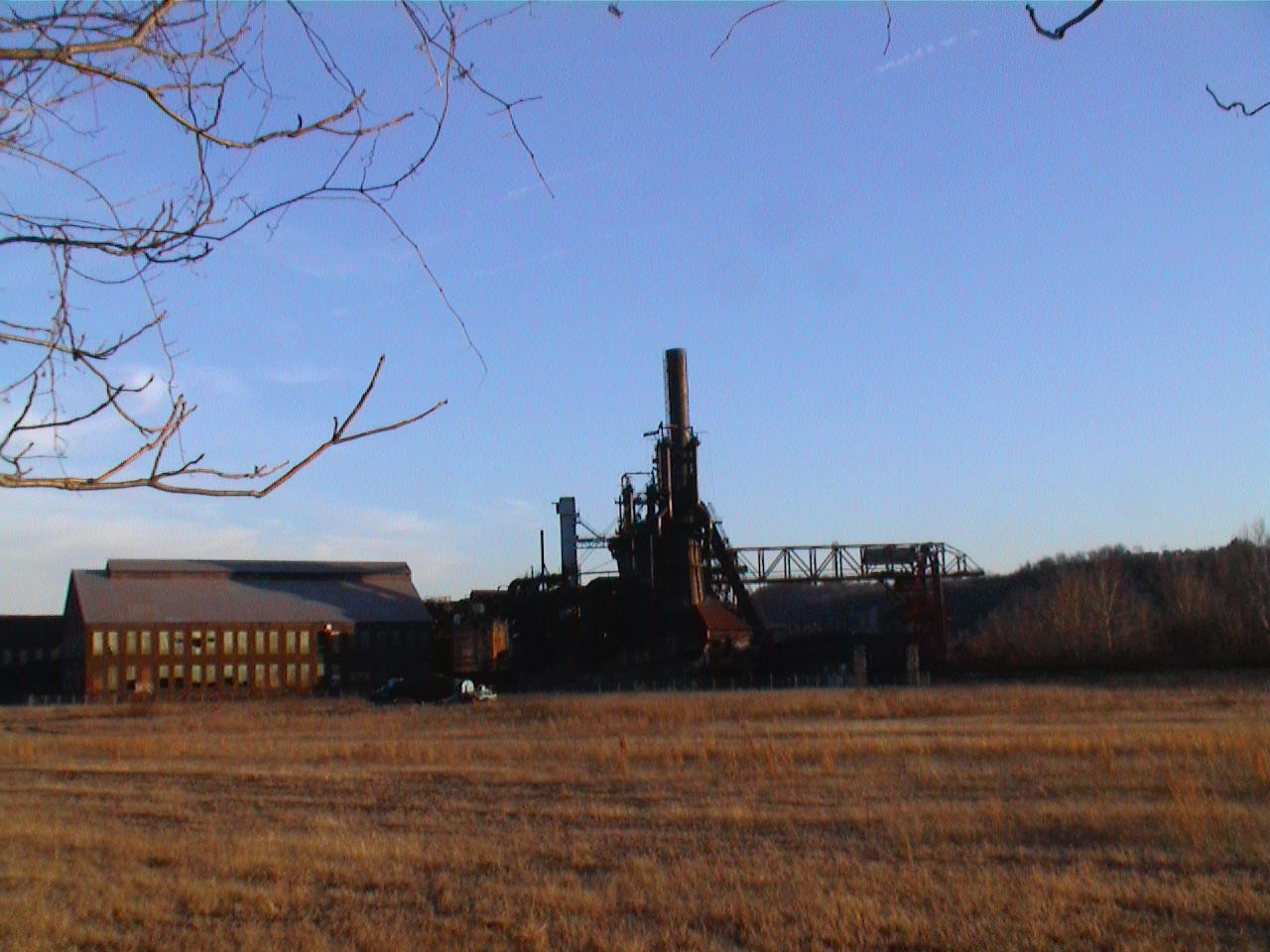
Carrie Furnace, a blast furnace across the Monongahela River from the main site

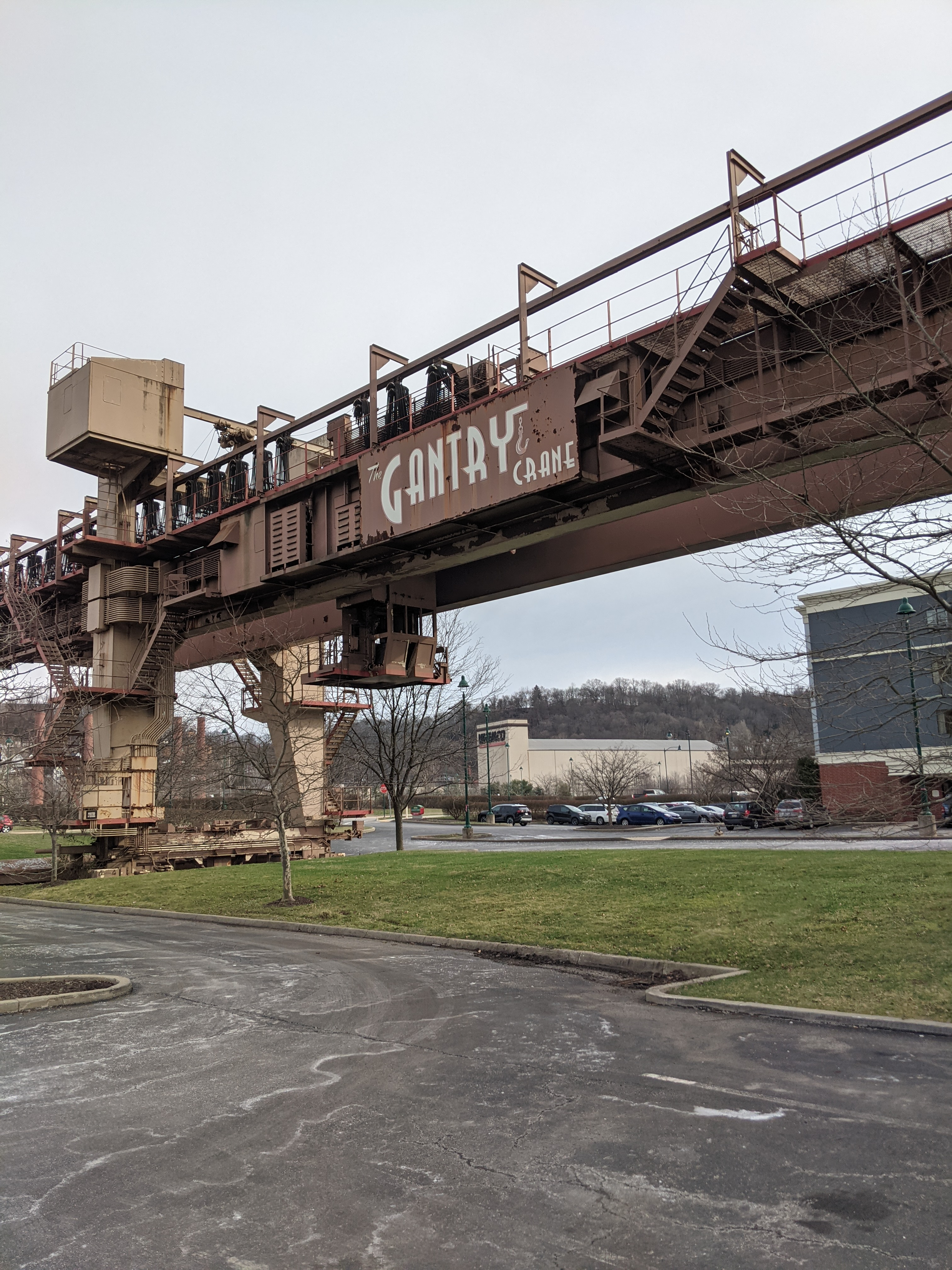
Gantry crane on the Monongahela riverbank, used for loading barges with steel

Today only a few remnants of the steel works remain, including twelve smokestacks in the middle of the Waterfront development. As of its opening in 1999, the land is partially occupied by The Waterfront, an outdoor shopping center. The gantry crane in the picture is actually part of a water pollution control project. Scale and waste from the Slab and Plate Mill was dumped into the Monongahela River, and the company built a catch basin where the crane was used to remove accumulated scale and other debris. The smokestacks belonged to the 45" mill soaking pits. A Dinky Locomotive now sits in a traffic circle (shown on YouTube) that was used to shuttle slabs between the 45" mill and the 160" mill.

== See also ==
- Carrie Furnace
