= The Waterfront =

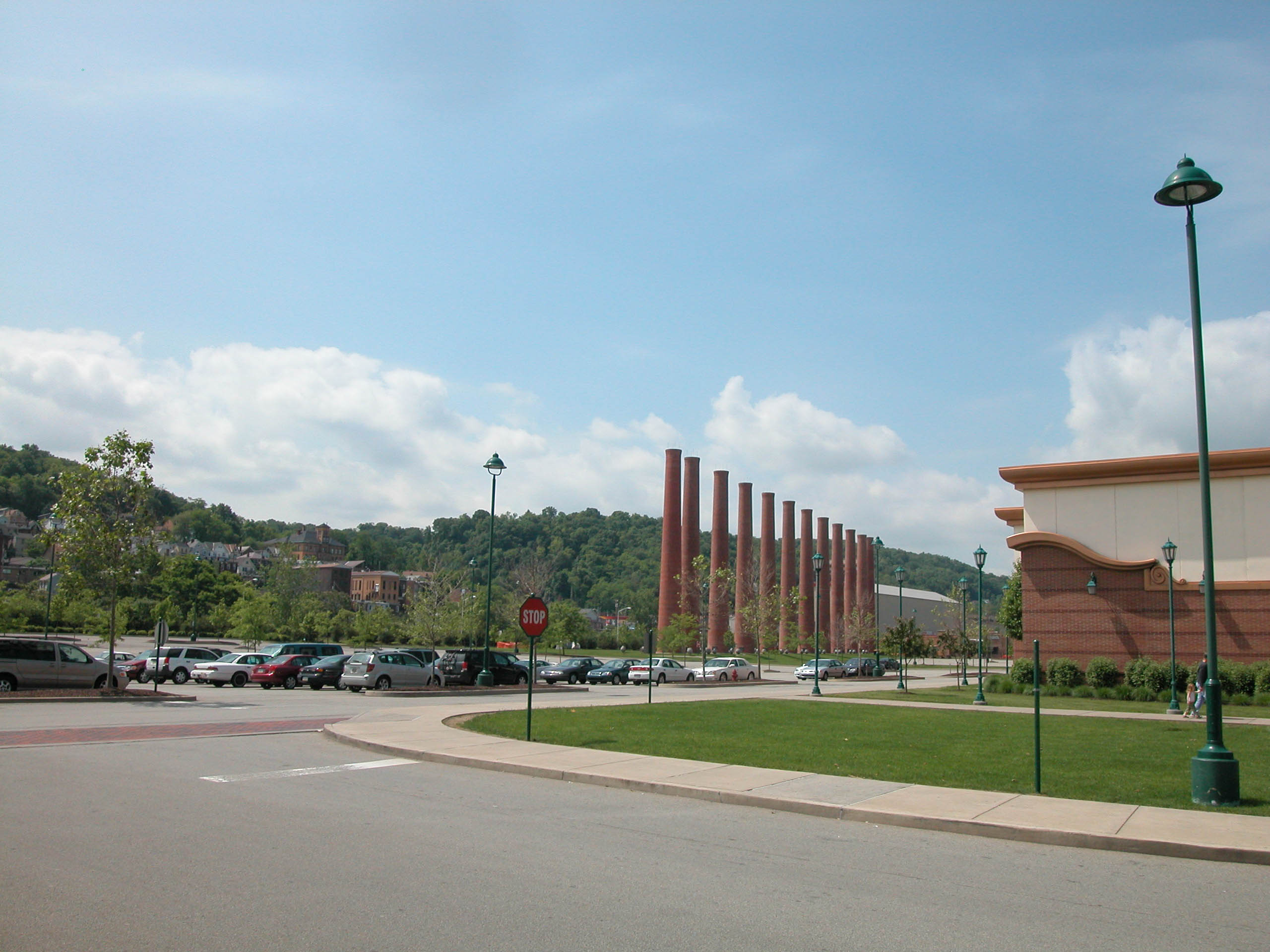
- Location: Homestead, West Homestead and Munhall
- Coordinates: 40°24′40″N 79°54′40″W
- Opened: 1999
- Developer: Continental Real Estate Companies and Nationwide Realty Investors Ltd.
- Owner: M&J Wilkow, Ltd.
- Num. of stores: 100+
- Num. of anchor tenants: 8
- Floor area: 1,100,000 square feet (100,000 m^{2})
- Floors: 1 (open-air, 2 in AMC and former Macy's)
- Public transit: Port Authority bus: 53, 53L, 57, 59, 61D, 64
- Website: waterfrontpgh.com

The Waterfront is a super-regional open air shopping mall spanning the three boroughs of Homestead, West Homestead, and Munhall near Pittsburgh. The shopping mall sits on land once occupied by U.S. Steel's Homestead Steel Works plant, which closed in 1986. It has a gross leasable area of 700,000 square feet (65,000 m^{2}) in "The Waterfront" and 400,000 square feet (37,000 m^{2}) in "The Town Center." The development officially opened in 1999. More development continued into the early 21st century.

The Waterfront is accessible from the Parkway East via the Homestead High-Level Bridge, now known as the Homestead Grays Bridge. Pennsylvania Route 837, which runs through the town of Homestead also connects drivers to The Waterfront via Amity Street and Waterfront Drive.

== History ==
The site still has the smokestacks of the 19th-century steel works that helped make Pittsburgh the greatest Steel City in America.

In 2005, Industrial Workers of the World celebrated their 100th Anniversary, having formed in there in 1905. The local celebration included events held at the Pump House on the site of The Waterfront.

=== Homestead strike ===
The Pump House is the location of the landing of the Pinkertons who navigated the river in 1892 with the intention to provide security at the plant that was subject to a labor strike of the Amalgamated Association of Iron and Steel Workers at the instruction of Henry Clay Frick.

The battle that followed, known as the Homestead Strike/Battle of Homestead, left sixteen people dead (twenty-three wounded) and set back the cause of organizing the iron and steel industry in Pittsburgh for decades. The Battle of Homestead is one of the most noted strikes in American Labor History.

== Layout and features ==
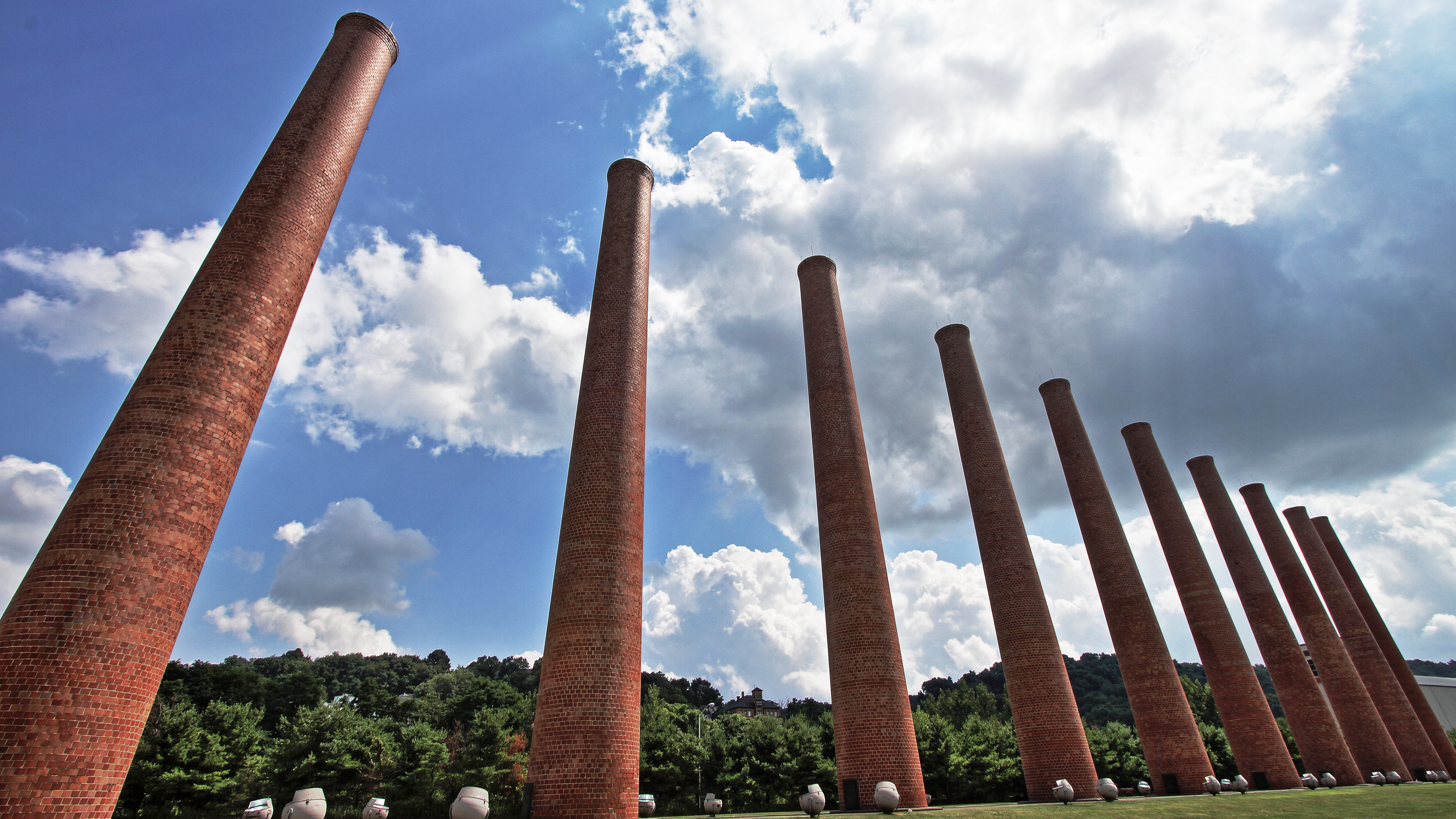
The stacks from the soaking pits of the 45-inch rolling mill of US Steel's Homestead Works, left to pay homage to the complex's former use as a steel mill

The Waterfront, unlike the SouthSide Works located a few miles up the river, was developed in a more suburban fashion, with retail, residential, and office spaces all being separated from each other by vast parking lots; however, unlike the Southside Works, the Waterfront did not benefit from proximity to, and unrestricted access to, a thriving urban commercial area. While comparisons of relative tax yield are often made, these comparisons do not take into account the sizeable public investment required to facilitate the Southside Works. The Waterfront was predominantly a private investment, although there was a tax increment financing of approximately $25 million approved by three separate municipalities, one county, and one school district, a notable accomplishment.

Traffic congestion within the development is common due to the large distances between outlets and the lack of sidewalks and pathways; the limited entrances into and out of The Waterfront also add to the congestion. The complex is separated from the original sections of Homestead, West Homestead, and Munhall, via railroad tracks and does not physically or visually connect with the older sections of the municipalities, which was impossible due to the active rail lines.

To facilitate access, Allegheny County constructed a new access ramp to the site from the Homestead High Level (Grays) Bridge, and also partnered with the Commonwealth of Pennsylvania in 1993 on the construction of the East Flyover Ramp in Munhall Borough. The construction of this ramp was undertaken in advance of development plans that were announced in 1997. This resulted in a ramp which proved to be less than optimal.

The Town Center area of the development is home to stores including Macy's (formerly Kaufmann's, both now defunct), Barnes & Noble, and a Loews Cineplex. The eastern end of the development resembles more of a traditional suburban strip mall, with many big-box retail stores fronting a large parking lot. Stores here include Bed Bath & Beyond, Dick's Sporting Goods, Giant Eagle grocery, Lowe's, and Target.

== Kaufmann's prototype ==
In 2002, Kaufmann's parent company, May Co., announced it would construct a scaled-down version of its department store at The Waterfront. It was the first of its kind in the now-defunct department store company. On September 9, 2006, Kaufmann's became part of the Macy's company.

The store was replaced with the Macy's nameplate and at the time was one of the smaller Macy's department stores in the chain. In 2018, Macy's announced the closing of this location. It now is a Siemens.

In August 2019, it was confirmed that the location would house 2 new tenants, Siemens and Commonwealth Charter Academy.

== Community involvement ==
Every May, The Waterfront welcomes The Mentoring Partnership of Southwestern Pennsylvania and many local youth mentoring agencies to the Town Center to talk to shoppers about the importance of mentoring and the number of local children waiting for mentors. In the month of October, The Waterfront recognizes Domestic Violence Awareness month in conjunction with Womansplace. Additionally, they host walks to support research for cancer and polycystic kidney disease.
