= Munhall, Pennsylvania =

Borough in Pennsylvania, US

- Borough
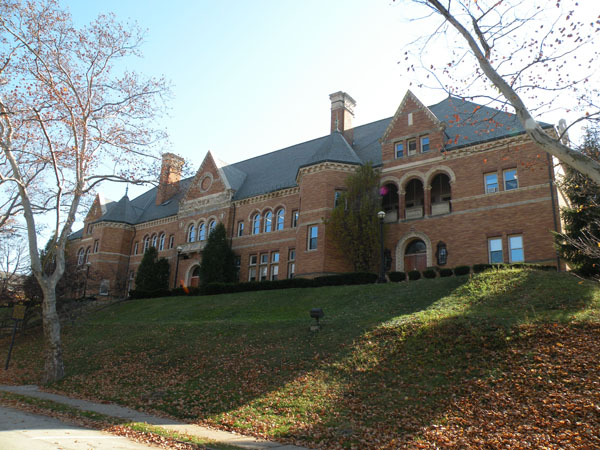
- The Carnegie Library of Homestead, built from 1896 to 1898, located in Munhall
- Motto: "Honoring the past, celebrating the present, and welcoming the future."
- Location in Allegheny County and the U.S. state of Pennsylvania.
- Coordinates: 40°23′28.33″N 79°54′4.4″W
- Country: United States
- State: Pennsylvania
- County: Allegheny

Government
  - Mayor: Richard Brennan
  - Council President: Harvey Inglis

Area
  - Total: 2.36 sq mi (6.12 km^{2})
  - Land: 2.29 sq mi (5.94 km^{2})
  - Water: 0.069 sq mi (0.18 km^{2})

Population (2020)
  - Total: 10,774
  - Density: 4,698.4/sq mi (1,814.05/km^{2})
- Time zone: UTC-5 (EST)
  - Summer (DST): UTC-4 (EDT)
- ZIP Code: 15120
- Area code: 412
- FIPS code: 42-52320
- Website: www.munhallpa.us

Munhall is a borough in Allegheny County, Pennsylvania, United States, on the west bank of the Monongahela River. The population was 10,774 at the 2020 census. It is a residential suburb of the Pittsburgh metropolitan area.

Located 8 miles (13 km) south of the confluence of the Monongahela and the Allegheny rivers where the Ohio River begins, Munhall abuts the borough of Homestead. A large part of the Homestead Works of the Carnegie Steel Company existed in Munhall. Munhall, along with the boroughs of Homestead and West Homestead, is served by the Steel Valley School District.

== History ==
A post office called Munhall was established in 1887. The borough was formed on June 24, 1901, out of a part of Mifflin Township, and named for John Munhall, the original owner of the town site.

== Geography ==
Munhall is located at 40°23′28″N 79°54′4″W (40.391202, −79.901221).

According to the United States Census Bureau, the borough has a total area of 2.4 square miles (6.2 km^{2}), of which 2.3 square miles (6.0 km^{2}) is land and 0.1 square miles (0.26 km^{2}), or 4.55%, is water.

=== Surrounding and adjacent communities ===
Munhall has six land borders, including Whitaker to the east, West Mifflin to the south and east, West Homestead to the west, Homestead to the northwest, and the Pittsburgh neighborhoods of Lincoln Place to the southwest and New Homestead to the south-southwest.

Across the Monongahela River, Munhall runs adjacent with (from north to southeast) the Pittsburgh neighborhood of Swisshelm Park, Swissvale and Rankin.

== Demographics ==
Historical population
Census	Pop.	Note	%±
1910	5,185		—
1920	6,438		24.2%
1930	12,995		101.8%
1940	13,900		7.0%
1950	16,437		18.3%
1960	17,332		5.4%
1970	16,574		−4.4%
1980	14,535		−12.3%
1990	13,158		−9.5%
2000	12,264		−6.8%
2010	11,406		−7.0%
2020	10,774		−5.5%

=== 2020 census ===
As of the 2020 census, Munhall had a population of 10,774. The median age was 43.8 years. 17% of residents were under the age of 18 and 21.8% of residents were 65 years of age or older. For every 100 females there were 90.4 males, and for every 100 females age 18 and over there were 88.2 males age 18 and over.

100% of residents lived in urban areas, while none lived in rural areas.

There were 5,139 households in Munhall, of which 19.6% had children under the age of 18 living in them. Of all households, 35% were married-couple households, 22.2% were households with a male householder and no spouse or partner present, and 36% were households with a female householder and no spouse or partner present. About 40.4% of all households were made up of individuals and 18.8% had someone living alone who was 65 years of age or older.

There were 5,824 housing units, of which 11.8% were vacant. The homeowner vacancy rate was 1.1% and the rental vacancy rate was 9.5%.

Racial composition as of the 2020 census
Race	Number	Percent
White	8,638	80.2%
Black or African American	1,385	12.9%
American Indian and Alaska Native	10	0.1%
Asian	114	1.1%
Native Hawaiian and Other Pacific Islander	0	0%
Some other race	100	0.9%
Two or more races	527	4.9%
Hispanic or Latino (of any race)	254	2.4%

=== 2000 census ===
As of the 2000 census, there were 12,264 people, 5,364 households, and 3,239 families residing in the borough. The population density was 5,311.2 inhabitants per square mile (2,050.7/km^{2}). There were 5,780 housing units at an average density of 2,503.2 per square mile (966.5/km^{2}). The racial makeup of the borough was 94.78% White, 3.38% African American, 02% Native American, 0.61% Asian, 0.29% from other races, and 0.92% from two or more races. Hispanic or Latino of any race were 0.80% of the population.

There were 5,364 households, out of which 24.5% had children under the age of 18 living with them, 43.5% were married couples living together, 13.4% had a female householder with no husband present, and 39.6% were non-families. 35.7% of all households were made up of individuals, and 19.3% had someone living alone who was 65 years of age or older. The average household size was 2.25 and the average family size was 2.95.

In the borough the population was spread out, with 20.7% under the age of 18, 6.9% from 18 to 24, 26.8% from 25 to 44, 23.2% from 45 to 64, and 22.3% who were 65 years of age or older. The median age was 42 years. For every 100 females, there were 85 males. For every 100 females age 18 and over, there were 81.3 males.

The median income for a household in the borough was $32,832, and the median income for a family was $41,847. Males had a median income of $32,202 versus $24,029 for females. The per capita income for the borough was $18,052. About 9.7% of families and 11.9% of the population were below the poverty line, including 18.2% of those under age 18 and 7.8% of those age 65 or over.

== Arts and culture ==
The Homestead Library, located in Munhall, was donated by Andrew Carnegie in 1896. It has been restored and modernized during the last quarter of a century - new electrical lighting has been installed, computers for the use of visitors have been installed, and the gloominess inside has vanished. Additionally, there are indoor pools, basketball courts, and other recreational facilities.

In 2000, Continental Realestate Companies opened The Waterfront. This large "LifeStyle" shopping center was built on the former site of the Carnegie Steel Works. Most of the structures associated with the steel mills on this site were demolished during construction. Still standing in the Waterfront development are some of the brick stacks from the Homestead Steel Works. In addition, near the river is a former mill structure known as the Pump House which was restored by the developer.

The Byzantine Catholic Cathedral of St. John the Baptist, serving the Archeparchy of Pittsburgh, is also located in the borough.

The Great Allegheny Passage, part of a shared-use path connecting Pittsburgh to Washington, D.C., runs through the borough parallel to the river.

== Government and politics ==
Presidential election results
Year	Republican	Democratic	Third parties
2020	41% 2,608	57% 3,570	1% 75
2016	43% 2,309	56% 3,038	1% 83
2012	40% 2,108	59% 3,157	1% 46

== Notable people ==
- Gabby Barrett, American Idol, ABC Revival American Idol season 16 Contestant Third Place Finisher
- Albert Belan, Former Member of the Pennsylvania State Senate
- Luke Getsy, Chicago Bears Offensive Coordinator
- Ed Piskor, alternative comics artist, Eisner Award winner
- Tom Ridge, U.S. Representative from Pennsylvania and the 43rd Governor of Pennsylvania

Preceded by West Mifflin	Bordering communities of Pittsburgh	Succeeded by West Homestead
