= National Register of Historic Places listings in Allegheny County, Pennsylvania =

Location of Allegheny County in Pennsylvania

This is a list of the National Register of Historic Places listings in Allegheny County, Pennsylvania.

This is intended to be a complete list of the properties and districts on National Register of Historic Places in Allegheny County, Pennsylvania, United States. The locations of National Register properties and districts for which the latitude and longitude coordinates are included below, may be seen in an online map.

There are 268 properties and districts listed on the National Register in the county, including 10 National Historic Landmarks. Pittsburgh is the location of 191 of these properties and districts, including 5 National Historic Landmarks; they are listed separately, while the properties and districts elsewhere in the county, including 5 National Historic Landmarks, are listed here. Four properties are split between Pittsburgh and other parts of the county.

This National Park Service list is complete through NPS recent listings posted July 10, 2026.

== Current listings ==
	Name on the Register	Image	Date listed	Location	City or town	Description
1	Allegheny River Lock and Dam No. 2	Allegheny River Lock and Dam No. 2	April 21, 2000 (#00000396)	7451 Lockway West; 40°29′24″N 79°54′51″W	O'Hara Township	Extends into Pittsburgh
2	Allegheny River Lock and Dam No. 3	Allegheny River Lock and Dam No. 3	April 21, 2000 (#00000397)	Approximately 1 mile (1.6 km) north of Barrington; 40°32′18″N 79°48′13″W	Harmar Township and Plum	
3	Allegheny River Lock and Dam No. 4	Allegheny River Lock and Dam No. 4	April 21, 2000 (#00000398)	1 River Avenue; 40°36′52″N 79°42′59″W	Harrison Township	Extends into Lower Burrell in Westmoreland County
4	Beulah Presbyterian Church	Beulah Presbyterian Church	November 3, 1975 (#75001606)	Beulah and McCrady Roads; 40°26′49″N 79°50′54″W	Churchill	
5	Bost Building	Bost Building	January 20, 1999 (#99000627)	621-623 East 8th Avenue; 40°24′33″N 79°54′16″W	Homestead	Headquarters of the Amalgamated Association of Iron and Steel Workers during the 1892 Homestead Strike
6	Bowman Homestead	Bowman Homestead	September 7, 1979 (#79003140)	North of McKeesport at 3500 The Lane; 40°22′14″N 79°49′31″W	North Versailles Township	
7	Boyce Station	Boyce Station	November 14, 1982 (#82001528)	1050 Boyce Road; 40°19′05″N 80°06′50″W	Upper St. Clair Township	Intact example of turn-of-century train station that served as local commercial center
8	Bridge in Jefferson Borough	Bridge in Jefferson Borough	June 22, 1988 (#88000938)	Cochran Mill Road over Lick Run; 40°17′34″N 79°58′13″W	Jefferson Hills and South Park Township	
9	Bridge in Shaler Township	Bridge in Shaler Township	June 22, 1988 (#88000797)	Birchfield Road over Pine Creek; 40°32′42″N 79°57′45″W	Shaler Township	
10	Burtner Stone House	Burtner Stone House	January 13, 1972 (#72001088)	Northwest of Natrona Heights on Burtner Road; 40°37′53″N 79°43′51″W	Harrison Township	
11	Campbell Building	Campbell Building	September 19, 1988 (#88001157)	3 Crafton Square; 40°26′08″N 80°03′54″W	Crafton	
12	Carnegie Free Library	Carnegie Free Library	October 15, 1980 (#80003402)	1507 Liberty Avenue; 40°20′43″N 79°51′19″W	McKeesport	
13	Carnegie Free Library of Braddock	Carnegie Free Library of Braddock	June 19, 1973 (#73001585)	419 Library Street; 40°24′07″N 79°51′56″W	Braddock	First Carnegie library built in the United States; designated a National Historic Landmark March 2, 2012 (as "Braddock Carnegie Library")
14	Andrew Carnegie Free Library	Andrew Carnegie Free Library	October 8, 1981 (#81000523)	300 Beechwood Avenue; 40°24′25″N 80°05′09″W	Carnegie	
15	Carrie Blast Furnace Number 6 and 7	Carrie Blast Furnace Number 6 and 7	September 20, 2006 (#06001070)	Northern side of the Monongahela River, 0.5 miles (0.80 km) west of the Rankin Bridge; 40°24′47″N 79°53′24″W	Munhall, Rankin, and Swissvale	Only remainder of once-vast Homestead Steel Works
16	Rachel Carson House	Rachel Carson House	October 22, 1976 (#76001601)	613 Marion Avenue; 40°32′47″N 79°47′00″W	Springdale	Childhood home of author Rachel Carson
17	Coraopolis Armory	Coraopolis Armory	November 14, 1991 (#91001695)	835 5th Avenue; 40°31′10″N 80°10′08″W	Coraopolis	
18	Coraopolis Bridge	Coraopolis Bridge	January 7, 1986 (#86000021)	Ohio River Back Channel at Ferree Street and Grand Avenue; 40°30′58″N 80°09′07″W	Coraopolis and Neville Township	
19	Coraopolis Railroad Station	Coraopolis Railroad Station	April 20, 1979 (#79002156)	Neville Avenue and Mill Street; 40°31′08″N 80°09′49″W	Coraopolis	
20	Davis Island Lock and Dam Site	Davis Island Lock and Dam Site	August 29, 1980 (#80003400)	Off Pennsylvania Route 65; 40°29′35″N 80°03′56″W	Avalon	
21	Elmridge	Elmridge	May 10, 2005 (#05000412)	Beaver Road at Camp Meeting Road; 40°33′49″N 80°12′15″W	Leetsdale	
22	Evergreen Hamlet	Evergreen Hamlet	September 17, 1974 (#74001738)	Evergreen Hamlet Road; 40°30′29″N 79°59′39″W	Ross Township	
23	Experimental and Safety Research Coal Mines	Experimental and Safety Research Coal Mines	June 26, 2017 (#100001250)	Western side of Cochran Mill Rd., 2 miles south of Bruceton; 40°17′43″N 79°58′21″W	South Park Township	
24	Experimental Mine, U.S. Bureau of Mines	Experimental Mine, U.S. Bureau of Mines	October 18, 1974 (#74001732)	South of Bruceton off Cochran Mill Road; 40°18′18″N 79°58′51″W	South Park Township	
25	First Methodist Episcopal Church of McKeesport	First Methodist Episcopal Church of McKeesport	September 30, 2014 (#14000814)	1406 Cornell St. 40°20′47″N 79°51′30″W	McKeesport	
26	First United Presbyterian Church of Braddock	First United Presbyterian Church of Braddock	December 30, 2019 (#100004810)	724 Parker Ave. 40°24′08″N 79°51′57″W	Braddock	
27	Fortieth Street Bridge	Fortieth Street Bridge	June 22, 1988 (#88000820)	40th Street over the Allegheny River; 40°28′25″N 79°58′12″W	Millvale	Extends into Pittsburgh
28	Fulton Log House	Fulton Log House	December 6, 1975 (#75001610)	Southwest of Pittsburgh on Clifton-Bridgeville Road off U.S. Route 19; 40°19′59″N 80°04′14″W	Upper St. Clair Township	
29	Gardner-Bailey House	Gardner-Bailey House	October 1, 1974 (#74001739)	124 West Swissvale Avenue; 40°25′55″N 79°53′12″W	Edgewood	
30	Gilfillan Farm	Gilfillan Farm	November 20, 1979 (#79002155)	1950 Washington Road; 40°20′32″N 80°03′52″W	Upper St. Clair Township	Mid-19th century farm still working amid modern suburban development (now partially a county park); main house shows transition between Greek Revival and Victorian architectural styles
31	Hamnett Historic District	Hamnett Historic District	June 28, 2010 (#10000408)	Roughly bounded by Rebecca Ave., rear property lines on the east side of Center St., Sewer Way, Lytle Way, and the Norfolk Southern RR right-of-way 40°26′19″N 79°53′05″W	Wilkinsburg	
32	Homestead High-Level Bridge	Homestead High-Level Bridge	January 7, 1986 (#86000016)	Monongahela River at West Street; 40°24′40″N 79°55′09″W	Homestead	Extends into Pittsburgh
33	Homestead Historic District	Homestead Historic District	May 10, 1990 (#90000696)	8th Avenue area roughly bounded by Mesta, 6th, Andrew, 11th, and Walnut Streets and Doyle and 7th Avenues; 40°24′17″N 79°54′27″W	Homestead, Munhall, and West Homestead	
34	Homestead Pennsylvania Railroad Station	Homestead Pennsylvania Railroad Station	December 26, 1985 (#85003157)	Amity Street; 40°24′29″N 79°54′45″W	Homestead	
35	Hutchinson Farm	Hutchinson Farm	February 19, 1986 (#86000321)	Round Hill Road at Pennsylvania Route 51; 40°14′23″N 79°51′54″W	Elizabeth Township	
36	Jerome Street Bridge	Jerome Street Bridge	June 22, 1988 (#88000818)	5th Avenue over the Youghiogheny River; 40°21′02″N 79°52′12″W	McKeesport	
37	Kennywood Park	Kennywood Park	February 27, 1987 (#87000824)	4800 Kennywood Boulevard; 40°23′15″N 79°51′48″W	West Mifflin	Only large remaining U.S. "trolley" amusement park
38	Dr. Thomas R. Kerr House and Office	Dr. Thomas R. Kerr House and Office	September 2, 2003 (#03000885)	438 4th Street; 40°31′02″N 79°50′26″W	Oakmont	
39	Lehner Grain-and-Cider Mill and House	Lehner Grain-and-Cider Mill and House	October 24, 1996 (#96001202)	548 and 560 Penn Street; 40°30′13″N 79°50′45″W	Verona	
40	Isaac Lightner House	Isaac Lightner House	April 20, 1978 (#78002333)	2407 Mt. Royal Boulevard; 40°32′15″N 79°58′22″W	Shaler Township	
41	Lobb's Cemetery and Yohogania County Courthouse Site	Lobb's Cemetery and Yohogania County Courthouse Site	November 12, 1992 (#92001501)	Calamity Hollow Road at Lobb's Run; 40°15′46″N 79°54′58″W	Jefferson Hills	
42	Logans Ferry Powder Works Historic District	Logans Ferry Powder Works Historic District	May 7, 1998 (#98000399)	Barking Road; 40°32′18″N 79°45′56″W	Plum	
43	Longfellow School	Longfellow School	June 28, 1984 (#84003088)	Monroe Street and McClure Avenue; 40°25′20″N 79°53′30″W	Swissvale	
44	Longue Vue Club and Golf Course	Longue Vue Club and Golf Course	May 10, 2005 (#05000414)	400 Longue Vue Drive, Verona; 40°28′52″N 79°51′31″W	Penn Hills Township	
45	McKees Rocks Bridge	McKees Rocks Bridge	November 14, 1988 (#88002168)	Legislative Route 76, Spur 2, over the Ohio River at McKees Rocks; 40°28′37″N 80°02′56″W	McKees Rocks and Stowe Township	Extends into Pittsburgh
46	McKeesport National Bank	McKeesport National Bank	August 29, 1980 (#80003403)	5th Avenue and Sinclair Street; 40°21′04″N 79°51′43″W	McKeesport	
47	Andrew S. and Elizabeth Miller House	Andrew S. and Elizabeth Miller House	June 10, 2019 (#100004021)	366 Lincoln Ave. 40°29′40″N 80°03′08″W	Bellevue	
48	James Miller House	James Miller House	January 17, 1975 (#75001605)	East of Bethel on Manse Drive; 40°19′12″N 80°00′23″W	South Park Township	On the site of the Oliver Miller Homestead, first settled in 1772. In 1794, the first fired gunshots of the Whiskey Rebellion occurred on the property. In 1830, the log house was replaced with a large stone section, making it the "Stone Manse" house as it stands today.
49	Mine Roof Simulator	Mine Roof Simulator	June 26, 2017 (#100001251)	NIOSH, Bruceton Research Center, W. side of Cochran Hill Rd. 40°18′10″N 79°58′46″W	South Park Township	
50	MISSISSIPPI III	MISSISSIPPI III	September 21, 1983 (#83002066)	Neville Island; 40°30′44″N 80°07′12″W	Neville Township	The last of the Texas-deck sternwheelers, Showboat Becky Thatcher relocated from Marietta, Ohio, in October 2009. On the night of February 19, 2010, the Becky Thatcher sank at its mooring on Neville Island in the Ohio River. Demolition of the boat began on Monday, March 8, 2010.
51	Mooncrest Historic District	Mooncrest Historic District	September 18, 2013 (#13000741)	Roughly bounded by University Boulevard, Lee Drive, Thorn Run, Fern Hollow & Old Thorn Run Roads; 40°31′26″N 80°11′25″W	Moon Township	This community was built during World War II as housing for defense workers. Mooncrest residents produced armor plate, munitions, and ships at the nearby Dravo Corporation on Neville Island.
52	Mt. Alvernia Historic District		April 4, 2024 (#100010142)	146 Hawthorne Road; 40°29′34″N 79°58′13″W	Shaler Township	
53	Mt. Lebanon Historic District	Mt. Lebanon Historic District	September 30, 2014 (#14000813)	Roughly bounded by Gilkeson, Washington, Scott, and Pine Tree Rds., Mt. Lebanon, and Castle Shannon and Cedar Boulevards; 40°22′25″N 80°02′56″W	Mt. Lebanon Township	
54	Mount Saint Mary Convent and Saint Benedict Academy Historic District		April 21, 2025 (#100011704)	4530 Perrysville Avenue; 40°30′00″N 80°01′18″W	Ross Township	
55	Oakdale Public School	Oakdale Public School	March 28, 1997 (#97000289)	33 Hastings Street; 40°23′54″N 80°11′00″W	Oakdale	
56	Oakmont Country Club Historic District	Oakmont Country Club Historic District	August 17, 1984 (#84003090)	Hulton Road; 40°31′33″N 79°49′36″W	Plum	Oldest top-ranked golf course in the United States, designed by Henry Fownes and Edward Stotz in 1903
57	Ohringer Building	Ohringer Building	August 6, 2020 (#100005421)	640 Braddock Ave. 40°24′09″N 79°52′03″W	Braddock	
58	Pennsalt Historic District	Pennsalt Historic District	July 18, 1985 (#85001571)	Roughly bounded by Federal, Penn, and Pond Streets, and Philadelphia and Blue Ridge Avenues, in Natrona; 40°36′53″N 79°43′17″W	Harrison Township	Former company town of the Pennsylvania Salt Manufacturing Company
59	Pennsylvania Railroad Station-Wilkinsburg	Pennsylvania Railroad Station-Wilkinsburg	July 18, 1985 (#85001568)	Hay Street at Ross Avenue; 40°26′35″N 79°53′17″W	Wilkinsburg	
60	The Peoples Bank Building		July 5, 2022 (#100007865)	301 5th Ave. 40°21′04″N 79°51′53″W	McKeesport	
61	Pitcairn School #1		September 24, 2025 (#100012293)	580-582 Sixth Street (intersection of Sixth Street and Highland Ave.); 40°24′19″N 79°46′33″W	Pitcairn Borough	
62	Reed Hall	Reed Hall	November 28, 1980 (#80003401)	West of Emsworth on Huntington Road; 40°30′57″N 80°06′44″W	Kilbuck Township	Reed Hall was part of the former Dixmont State Hospital, which opened in 1862. Architect: Joseph W. Kerr (1815–1888). The entire hospital, including Reed Hall, was demolished in 2006.
63	St. Colman School		May 8, 2025 (#100011773)	547 Hunter Street; 40°24′21″N 79°49′41″W	Turtle Creek	
64	St. Nicholas Croatian Church	St. Nicholas Croatian Church	May 6, 1980 (#80003404)	24 Maryland Avenue; 40°28′37″N 79°58′11″W	Millvale	
65	St. Thomas Memorial Church	St. Thomas Memorial Church	October 4, 2016 (#16000696)	378 Delaware Ave. 40°31′03″N 79°50′27″W	Oakmont	
66	Sauer Buildings Historic District	Sauer Buildings Historic District	September 11, 1985 (#85002296)	607-717 Center Avenue; 40°29′41″N 79°54′13″W	Aspinwall	The buildings in this district were designed by Frederick C. Sauer (1860–1942), from around 1900 until his death in 1942.
67	Charles M. Schwab House		July 25, 2025 (#100012042)	541 Jones Ave; 40°24′13″N 79°51′46″W	North Braddock	
68	David Shields House	David Shields House	October 29, 1975 (#75001607)	Shields Lane; 40°33′25″N 80°11′59″W	Edgeworth	
69	John F. Singer House	John F. Singer House	November 13, 1974 (#74001744)	1318 Singer Place; 40°26′48″N 79°52′56″W	Wilkinsburg	
70	Sperling Building	Sperling Building	May 10, 2005 (#05000410)	1007-1013 Penn Avenue; 40°26′38″N 79°52′45″W	Wilkinsburg	
71	Thornburg Historic District	Thornburg Historic District	December 8, 1982 (#82001529)	Off Pennsylvania Route 60; 40°25′57″N 80°05′00″W	Thornburg	
72	Turtle Creek High School	Turtle Creek High School	August 30, 2007 (#07000880)	126 Monroeville Avenue; 40°24′18″N 79°49′26″W	Turtle Creek	
73	United States Post Office-Sewickley Branch	United States Post Office-Sewickley Branch	December 26, 2012 (#12001094)	200 Broad St. 40°32′13″N 80°11′03″W	Sewickley	
74	Van Kirk Farm	Van Kirk Farm	February 19, 1986 (#86000320)	Round Hill Road at Scenery Drive; 40°14′28″N 79°51′43″W	Elizabeth Township	
75	Walker-Ewing Log House	Walker-Ewing Log House	January 30, 1976 (#76001593)	Northeast of Oakdale on Noblestown Road; 40°24′40″N 80°09′36″W	Collier Township	Log house built circa 1790
76	Nicholas Way House	Nicholas Way House	September 13, 1978 (#78002339)	108 Beaver Road; 40°32′51″N 80°11′19″W	Edgeworth	
77	Westinghouse Air Brake Company General Office Building	Westinghouse Air Brake Company General Office Building	March 6, 1987 (#87000376)	Marguerite and Bluff Streets; 40°23′32″N 79°48′27″W	Wilmerding	Built in 1890, this building contained the offices of the Westinghouse Air Brake Company, founded by George Westinghouse.
78	George Westinghouse Memorial Bridge	George Westinghouse Memorial Bridge	March 28, 1977 (#77001120)	U.S. Route 30 at Turtle Creek; 40°23′38″N 79°50′16″W	East Pittsburgh and North Versailles Township	
79	Wilkinsburg Historic District	Wilkinsburg Historic District	May 14, 2018 (#100002401)	Roughly bounded by North, E. Swissvale, Center, and Rebecca Aves., Stoner Way, and the MLK Jr. East Busway; 40°26′30″N 79°52′43″W	Wilkinsburg	
80	Wilpen Hall	Wilpen Hall	April 20, 2011 (#11000201)	889-895 Blackburn Road and 201 Scaife Road; 40°32′52″N 80°09′05″W	Sewickley Heights	
81	Woodville	Woodville	February 5, 1974 (#74001733)	South of Heidelberg on Pennsylvania Route 50; 40°22′47″N 80°05′47″W	Collier Township	1785 home of John Neville, tax collector targeted by the Whiskey Rebels. Preserved and restored to near-original condition; today one of the oldest houses in the county.

== Former listing ==
	Name on the Register	Image	Date listed	Date removed	Location	City or town	Description
1	Linden Grove	Linden Grove	November 5, 1987 (#87001970)	January 20, 2000	Grove Road at Library Road and Willow Avenue; 40°22′03″N 80°00′51″W	Castle Shannon	Delisted due to extensive alterations.

== See also ==
- National Register of Historic Places listings in Pennsylvania
- List of National Historic Landmarks in Pennsylvania
- List of City of Pittsburgh historic designations
- List of Pittsburgh History and Landmarks Foundation Historic Landmarks
- List of Pennsylvania state historical markers in Allegheny County
