= Powder Magazine =

Powder Magazine, Powder House, or Powderworks may refer to:

- Powder tower or powder house, a building used to store gunpowder or explosives; common until the 20th century
- Gunpowder magazine, a building designed to store gunpowder in wooden barrels; historical successor to the above
- Magazine (artillery), an item or place within which ammunition or other explosive material is stored

== Structures in the United States ==
Alphabetical by state or territory, then by town or city

- Powder Magazine (Montgomery, Alabama), on the National Register of Historic Places (NRHP) listings in Montgomery County, Alabama
- Powder Magazine (Blue Ball, Arkansas), NRHP-listed
- Powder Magazine (Camp Drum), Los Angeles, California
- Sanchez Powder House Site, St. Augustine, Florida, NRHP-listed
- Confederate Powderworks, Augusta, Georgia
- Camp Parapet Powder Magazine, Metairie, Louisiana, NRHP-listed
- Powder House Square, a neighborhood and landmark rotary in Somerville, Massachusetts
  - Powder House Park, Somerville, Massachusetts, NRHP-listed
- Powder House Island, an artificial island in the Detroit River, Michigan
- Hessian Powder Magazine, Carlisle, Pennsylvania, NRHP-listed
- Logans Ferry Powder Works Historic District, Plum Borough, Pennsylvania, NRHP-listed
- Polvorín de Miraflores, San Juan, Puerto Rico, NRHP-listed
- Fort Johnson (South Carolina) Powder Magazine, NRHP-listed
- Powder Magazine (Charleston, South Carolina), a U.S. National Historic Landmark and NRHP-listed
- Jefferson Ordnance Magazine, Jefferson, Texas, NRHP-listed
- Civilian Conservation Corps Powder Magazine, Torrey, Utah, NRHP-listed

== Other uses ==
- "Powderworks" (song), by Midnight Oil, 1978
- Powder Magazine (skiing), a snow-skiing magazine for which John Bresee was a writer and managing editor
