= List of Pennsylvania state historical markers in Allegheny County =

Location of Allegheny County in Pennsylvania

This is a list of the Pennsylvania state historical markers in Allegheny County.

This is intended to be a complete list of the official state historical markers placed in Allegheny County, Pennsylvania by the Pennsylvania Historical and Museum Commission (PHMC). The locations of the historical markers, as well as the latitude and longitude coordinates as provided by the PHMC's database, are included below when available. There are currently 160 historical markers located in Allegheny County.

== Historical markers ==
Marker title	Image	Date dedicated	Location	Marker type	Topics
1909 McKee's Rocks Strike		October 14, 2000	812 Island Avenue at McKees Rocks Bridge, Stowe Township; 40.47372°N 80.06258°W	Roadside	Labor
1st Drive-In Filling Station		July 11, 2000	Near intersection of Baum Boulevard & St. Clair Streets, East Liberty/Friendship (Pittsburgh); 40.45934°N 79.93066°W	City	Business & Industry, Oil & Gas, Transportation
Allegheny Arsenal		June 1, 1967	40th Street near Davidson at Arsenal Park, opposite #257, Lawrenceville; 40.46719°N 79.9605°W	City	Civil War, French & Indian War, Military
Allegheny Cotton Mill Strikes		October 1, 2007	Allegheny Landing, near Allegheny River between Roberto Clemente (6th Street) & Andy Warhol (7th Street) Bridges, North Shore (Pittsburgh); 40.44706°N 80.00258°W	City	Government & Politics 19th Century, Labor, Mills
Allegheny County		December 30, 1982	County Courthouse (courtyard), Grant Street between 5th & Forbes Avenues, Pittsburgh; 40.438673°N 79.996396°W	City	Business & Industry, Government & Politics, Government & Politics 18th Century, Iron, Steel
Allegheny Observatory		November 2, 1979	Riverview Avenue in Riverview Park (off US 19) near Observatory, Observatory Hill, Pittsburgh; 40.48274°N 80.01831°W	City	Education, Medicine & Science, Transportation
Andrew Carnegie (1835-1919)		April 18, 1996	Carnegie Museum of Natural History, 4400 Forbes Avenue (Schenley Drive Extension), Oakland (Pittsburgh); 40.44277°N 79.95168°W	City	Business & Industry, Education, Ethnic & Immigration, Professions & Vocations, Steel
Art Blakey (1919-1990)		August 26, 2007	617 Chauncey Street, Hill District (Pittsburgh); 40.4479°N 79.97358°W	City	African American, Music & Theater, Performers
Arthur J. Rooney (1901-1988)		June 3, 2005	Tourman Street & Coulterville Road, Coulter; 40.295967°N 79.799300°W	Roadside	Ethnic & Immigration, Football, Sports
August Wilson (1945-2005)		May 30, 2007	1727 Bedford Ave., Hill District (Pittsburgh); 40.44521°N 79.98542°W	Roadside	African American, Music & Theater, Writers
Avery College		January 1, 1968	621 East Ohio Street, North Side (Pittsburgh); 40.453833°N 79.998363°W	City	African American, Education, Religion
Barney Dreyfuss (1865-1932)		June 30, 2005	Posvar Hall, Roberto Clemente & Schenley Drives, University of Pittsburgh, Oakland section 40.4416°N 79.95296°W	City	Baseball, Entrepreneurs, Sports
Bethel A.M.E. Church		September 24, 1995	405 1st Avenue, at Smithfield Street, Pittsburgh; 40.43716°N 80.0005°W	City	African American, Civil Rights, Education, Religion
Bethel Presbyterian Church		August 21, 1951	2999 Bethel Church Road between PA 88 & US 19, Bethel Park; 40.336476°N 80.047926°W	Roadside	Buildings, Education, Religion
Billy Eckstine (1914-1993)		July 31, 1994	5917 Bryant Street, Highland Park (Pittsburgh); 40.475567°N 79.919250°W	City	African American, Performers
Bost Building		July 7, 1992	617-623 East 8th Avenue near Heisel Street, Homestead; 40.409039°N 79.904394°W	City	Buildings, Iron, Labor, Publishing, Steel
Bouquet Camp		December 21, 1946	Saltsburg Road (PA 380) & Frankstown Avenue (Petermans Corner), Penn Hills Twp; 40.48414°N 79.81905°W	Roadside	Forts, French & Indian War, Military, Roads
Bower Hill		August 23, 1996	292 Kane Boulevard, Scott Twp., NE of Bridgeville; 40.37434°N 80.08614°W	Roadside	African American, American Revolution, George Washington, Mansions & Manors, Military, Whiskey Rebellion
Braddock's Crossing		August 24, 1964	Hoffman & Kennywood (PA 837) Boulevards at Kennywood Park, West Mifflin; 40.38524°N 79.86292°W	Roadside	French & Indian War, Military, Native American
Braddock's Defeat		February 28, 1948	549 Jones Avenue, Washington Statue Park, Braddock; 40.40296°N 79.86343°W	Roadside	Forts, French & Indian War, Military, Native American
Braddock's Defeat		February 28, 1948	US 30, north side, S of I-376 exit 10, Forest Hills (Missing)	Roadside	French & Indian War, Military, Native American
Braddock's Field		September 12, 1994	549 Jones Avenue, Washington Statue Park, Braddock; 40.403006°N 79.863265°W	Roadside	Government & Politics, Military, Whiskey Rebellion
Carnegie Hero Fund Commission		1995	301 Pittsburgh Street (SR 1001, old PA 28), across from Washington Street, Springdale; 40.54106°N 79.79061°W	Roadside	Business & Industry
Carnegie Library of Homestead Swim Team		August 14, 2004	Homestead Library, 510 East 10th Avenue, Munhall; 40.40733°N 79.90314°W	City	Sports, Women
Charles "Chuck" Cooper		March 14, 2021	Forbes Ave. & Magee St., Pittsburgh at UPMC Cooper Fieldhouse 40.43779°N 79.98835°W	City	African American, Sports & Recreation
Charles Martin Hall (1863-1914)		March 1, 1998	3200 Smallman St., Pittsburgh; 40.461581°N 79.9707°W	City	Business & Industry, Electricity, Entrepreneurs, Invention
Charles Taze Russell (1852-1916)		May 8, 2000	Allegheny Center, East Commons, at New Hazlett Theater (formerly Carnegie Hall), Pittsburgh; 40.45274°N 80.00488°W	City	Buildings, Houses & Homesteads, Religion
Chartier's Town		December 19, 1946	PA 28 at Tarentum (Missing)	City	Business & Industry, Cities & Towns, Early Settlement, Native American
Chartier's Old Town		November 13, 2015	At marina off E 1st Ave. at bridge, Tarentum 40.59844°N 79.75711°W	Roadside	Business & Industry, Cities & Towns, Early Settlement, Native American, Professions & Vocations
Clinton Furnace		September 2, 2004	Bessemer Court at Station Square, Pittsburgh; 40.434284°N 80.004582°W	Roadside	Business & Industry, Furnaces, Iron
Crawford Grill		April 7, 2001	Wylie Avenue at Elmore Street, Pittsburgh; 40.445503°N 79.977943°W	City	African American, Music & Theater
D. T. Watson Home for Crippled Children		October 19, 2018	301 Camp Mtg. Rd., Leet Twp. 40.57281°N 80.20136°W	Roadside	Science & Medicine
Daisy E. Lampkin		August 8, 1993	2519 Webster Avenue at Watt Lane, Hill District (Pittsburgh); 40.44991°N 79.97201°W	City	African American, Government & Politics, Government & Politics 20th Century, Women
David L. Lawrence		February 28, 1985	Point State Park, Pittsburgh (Missing)	City	Government & Politics, Government & Politics 19th Century, Governors
Davis Island Lock & Dam		July 4, 1987	1050 Ohio River Blvd. (PA 65) at E borough line, at Eat 'n' Park, Avalon; 40.494°N 80.06416°W	Roadside	Environment
Dorothy Mae Richardson (1922-1991)		October 16, 2019	1419 Arch St., Pittsburgh 40.45782°N 80.00961°W	City	African American, Civil Rights, Government & Politics 20th Century, Women
Dravo Corporation Shipyard		August 18, 1995	5500 Grand Avenue, at Memorial Park, beside fire station, Neville Island; 40.51182°N 80.12971°W	Roadside	Business & Industry, Entrepreneurs
Duquesne Steel Works		October 12, 1997	East Grant Avenue & Linden Street (PA 837), Duquesne; 40.37407°N 79.84241°W	City	Business & Industry, Entrepreneurs
Duquesne University		October 5, 1978	Bluff Street at University Administration Building, Pittsburgh; 40.4355°N 79.99285°W	City	Education, Ethnic & Immigration, Religion
Elizabeth		December 20, 1946	Between exit ramp of PA 51 and Elizabeth Bridge, Elizabeth; 40.2724°N 79.88489°W	Roadside	Business & Industry, Transportation
Ethelbert Nevin		May 7, 1948	Ohio River Boulevard (PA 65) at Edgeworth Lane, east side, Edgeworth; 40.54917°N 80.19664°W	Roadside	Music & Theater, Writers
Ethelbert Nevin		May 7, 1948	Ohio River Boulevard (PA 65), west side, at Edgeworth Lane (MISSING)	Roadside	Music & Theater
Ferris Wheel Inventor		1967	West Commons, Arch Street near South Diamond (MARKER NOT YET REINSTALLED)	City	George Washington, Invention, Professions & Vocations, Sports
First Aluminum Observatory Dome		June 27, 1998	Between West View Avenue & McKnight Road (Truck US 19), Ross Township; 40.499846°N 80.012819°W	Roadside	Education, Environment, Invention, Medicine & Science
First Mining of Pittsburgh Coal		April 18, 1985	Grandview Avenue between Ulysses & Bertha Streets, Mt. Washington (Pittsburgh); 40.43438°N 80.01127°W	City	Business & Industry, Coal
First Professional Football Game		November 3, 1992	North Shore Drive & Art Rooney Drive, near Heinz Field, North Shore (Pittsburgh); 40.44546°N 80.0137°W	Roadside	Football, Sports
First World Series		September 18, 1998	Riverwalk near PNC Park and the water steps, North Shore (Pittsburgh); 40.445401°N 80.009171°W	Roadside	Baseball, Sports
Forbes Field		July 7, 2006	3950 Roberto Clemente Drive near South Bouquet Street, by remaining Forbes Field wall, Pitt campus, Oakland (Pittsburgh); 40.44146°N 79.95282°W	Roadside	Baseball, Football, Sports
Forbes Road (Bouquet's Breastworks)		July 9, 1952	Old Frankstown Road, at Boyce Park Administration Building, Monroeville; 40.45997°N 79.7528°W	Roadside	French & Indian War, Military
Forbes Road, 1758, Fort Bedford to Fort Duquesne - Fort Duquesne End (PLAQUE)		1930	Point State Park, between Fort Pitt Museum & Blockhouse, Pittsburgh; 40.44109°N 80.00967°W	Plaque	Forts, French & Indian War, Military, Roads
Forbes Road, 1758, Fort Bedford to Fort Duquesne - The Bouquet Encampment (PLAQUE)		1930	PA 380 (Saltsburg & Frankstown Roads), Petermans Corner, Penn Hills Township; 40.4842°N 79.81918°W	Plaque	French & Indian War, Military, Roads
Fort Duquesne		May 8, 1959	Point State Park, main entrance at Commonwealth Place, Pittsburgh (MISSING)	City	Forts, French & Indian War, Military
Fort Lafayette		December 1, 1958	9th Street just north of Penn Avenue, Pittsburgh; 40.4437°N 79.99834°W	City	Forts, Military, Native American, War of 1812
Fort Pitt		May 8, 1959	Point State Park, main entrance Commonwealth Place, Pittsburgh (MISSING)	City	Forts, French & Indian War, Military
Fort Pitt Blockhouse		May 8, 1959	Point State Park, main entrance Commonwealth Place, Pittsburgh (MISSING)	City	Forts, French & Indian War, Military
Fort Prince George		May 8, 1959	Point State Park, main entrance Commonwealth Place, Pittsburgh (MISSING)	City	Forts, French & Indian War, George Washington, Military
Founding Convention of the AFL		September 24, 1997	Northwest corner of Mellon Park, between 5th & 6th Streets, opposite William Penn Hotel, Pittsburgh; 40.4409°N 79.9975°W	City	Labor
Founding Convention of the CIO		September 23, 1997	North Commons Drive, at MLK Elementary, near Allegheny Center, Pittsburgh; 40.45433°N 80.00448°W	City	Labor
Founding of Ironworkers Union		May 22, 1999	At Firstside Park, Grant Street, between Boulevard of the Allies and 1st Avenue, Pittsburgh; 40.43665°N 79.99854°W	City	Iron, Labor
Frances Perkins		October 4, 2003	Southwest corner of 9th Avenue & Amity Street, at police station, Homestead; 40.40628°N 79.91019°W	City	Government & Politics 20th Century, Labor, Steel, Women
Frank Conrad (1874-1941)		December 1, 1990	PA 8 (Penn Avenue) & South Trenton Avenue, Wilkinsburg; 40.445818°N 79.891436°W	City	Business & Industry, Entrepreneurs
Frank E. Bolden (1912-2003)		September 30, 2004	2621 Centre Avenue, across from YMCA, Hill District (Pittsburgh); 40.4468°N 79.96774°W	City	African American, Military Post-Civil War, Publishing, Writers
Frank Vittor (1888-1968)		October 12, 2008	At Columbus statue in Schenley Park, Schenley Drive & Frew Street Extension, Oakland (Pittsburgh); 40.440433°N 79.948300°W	Roadside	Artists, Ethnic & Immigration
Frederick Ingersoll (1874-1927)		April 27, 2019	At Kennywood Park, 4800 Kennywood Blvd., West Mifflin 40.38517°N 79.86372°W	Roadside	Invention, Professions & Vocations, Sports & Recreation
Gen. Matthew B. Ridgway (1895-1993)		November 6, 1999	Fox Chapel High School, 611 Field Club Road, Fox Chapel; 40.51775°N 79.86756°W	Roadside	Military, Military Post-Civil War
George Westinghouse		May 7, 1948	US 30 at west end of George Westinghouse Bridge over Turtle Creek, Turtle Creek; 40.39487°N 79.83875°W	Roadside	Business & Industry, Electricity, Entrepreneurs, Invention
George Westinghouse		December 23, 1946	US 30 at east end of George Westinghouse Bridge over Turtle Creek, Turtle Creek (MISSING)	Roadside	Business & Industry, Electricity, Entrepreneurs, Invention
Great Steel Strike of 1919, The		September 23, 1994	Braddock Avenue at 14th Street, across from Edgar Thompson Works, Braddock; 40.39852°N 79.8622°W	City	Government & Politics, Labor, Steel
Greenlee Field		July 17, 2009	Bedford Avenue & Junilla Street, Hill District (Pittsburgh); 40.4506°N 79.973°W	City	African American, Football, Sports
Hand's Hospital		December 24, 1946	PA 60 (West Steuben Street) at Linden Street, across from Crafton Park, Crafton; 40.43913°N 80.07339°W	Roadside	French & Indian War, Military
Heidelberg Raceway and Sports Arena		July 15, 2012	Washington Pike (PA 50), in front of King's Restaurant, Heidelberg; 40.387450°N 80.091450°W	City	Performers, Railroads, Sports & Recreation
Helen Richey (1909-1947)		October 1, 2002	Renzie Park, Eden Park Boulevard & Tulip Drive, McKeesport; 40.34063°N 79.82724°W	Roadside	Education, Military, Military Post-Civil War, Professions & Vocations, Transportation, Women
Henry Clay Frick (1848-1919)		December 10, 1946	Grant Street near 5th Avenue, in median at Frick Bldg., Pittsburgh; 40.43928°N 79.996884°W	City	Business & Industry, Coal
Henry J. Heinz (1844-1919)		September 14, 1994	Chestnut & Progress Streets, North Side (Pittsburgh); 40.453317°N 79.992673°W	City	Business & Industry, Entrepreneurs
Homestead Grays, The		September 27, 2000	Amity Street at The Waterfront, at parking lot and railroad tracks, Homestead; 40.409218°N 79.912121°W	Roadside	African American, Baseball, Sports
Homestead Strike		July 1, 1992	880 East Waterfront Drive, Munhall; 40.41285°N 79.89711°W	City	Government & Politics, Labor
Homestead Strike Victims		July 11, 1993	At Cemetery, 102 East 22nd & Dewey Streets, Munhall; 40.39762°N 79.9019°W	Roadside	Labor
Honus Wagner (1874-1955)		August 29, 1998	Mansfield Boulevard & Chartiers Street, Carnegie; 40.407281°N 80.088843°W	Roadside	Baseball, Ethnic & Immigration, Sports
James Hay Reed		December 1, 1958	Carnegie Science Center (south of North Commons), North Side (Pittsburgh); 40.45321°N 80.00587°W	City	Business & Industry, Professions & Vocations
Jane Grey Swisshelm		September 14, 1959	South Braddock Avenue & New Street, Edgewood, just north of I-376 exit 77; 40.42867°N 79.89134°W	Roadside	Civil Rights, Civil War, Medicine & Science, Women, Writers
Jane Holmes (1805-1885)		May 29, 2007	Western PA School for Blind Children, Bayard Street at North Bellefield Avenue, Schenley Farms (Pittsburgh); 40.44823°N 79.95295°W	City	Women
John A. Roebling (1806-1869)		1996	Smithfield Street Bridge, Station Square (Pittsburgh); 40.43335°N 80.00328°W	City	Bridges, Transportation
John M. Phillips (1861-1953)		October 31, 2009	St. Pius X Byzantine Catholic Church, 2336 Brownsville Road, Pittsburgh; 40.3884°N 79.9852°W	City	Government & Politics 19th Century, Government & Politics 20th Century, Professions & Vocations
John Scull (1765-1828)		December 1, 1958	Boulevard of the Allies, just west of Market Street, Pittsburgh; 40.43902°N 80.00376°W	City	Business & Industry, Professions & Vocations, Publishing
John T. Comès (1873-1922)		January 27, 2013	St. Agnes Center at Carlow University, 3219 5th Avenue, Oakland (Pittsburgh); 40.350572°N 79.86764°W	City	Buildings & Architecture, Professions & Vocations, Religion, Writers
Johnny Unitas (1933-2002)		September 4, 2004	Arsenal Middle School Field, Butler & 40th Streets, Lawrenceville; 40.46827°N 79.96268°W	City	Football, Sports
Joshua (Josh) Gibson (1911-1947)		September 23, 1996	2217 Bedford Avenue, Hill District (Pittsburgh); 40.44861°N 79.97754°W	City	African American, Baseball, Sports
Joshua Meeks (1731-1818)		May 7, 2008	Beaver Grade Road at entrance to Forest Glen Condos, Moon Township; 40.509622°N 80.212178°W	Roadside	American Revolution, Early Settlement, Education, Government & Politics 18th Century, Military
K. Leroy Irvis (1916-2006)		April 3, 2008	2170 Centre Avenue, Hill District (Pittsburgh)(MISSING)	Roadside	African American, Civil Rights, Education, Government & Politics 20th Century, Labor
Kennedy-Nixon Taft-Hartley Debate		June 23, 2012	5th Avenue at Market Street (PA 148), McKeesport; 40.350572°N 79.86764°W	City	Politics, Labor Unions
Kennywood Park		August 5, 1992	Just outside North Gate Entrance from parking lot, West Mifflin; 40.3857°N 79.86564°W	Roadside	Sports
Kier Refinery		March 16, 1959	Small park near Chatham/Bigelow Square, between Bigelow Boulevard & 7th Avenue, Pittsburgh; 40.44145°N 79.99405°W	City	Business & Industry, Entrepreneurs
Kuskusky Path		August 24, 2008	2500 Brandt School Road, at Trinity Lutheran Church, Wexford (Franklin Park); 40.601906°N 80.080242°W	Roadside	Early Settlement, Military, Native American, Paths & Trails, Transportation
Lewis and Clark Expedition		August 28, 2008	1 block north of 10th Street Bypass & Waterfront Drive intersection, Pittsburgh; 40.447°N 79.9952°W	City	Exploration
Lois Weber (1879-1939)		June 13, 2019	1230 Federal St., Pittsburgh 40.4563°N 80.0068°W	City	Invention, Motion Pictures & Television, Performers, Professions & Vocations, Women, Writers
Martha Graham (1894-1991)		June 7, 2008	California Avenue & Brighton Road North Side (Pittsburgh) (Pittsburgh); 40.459427°N 80.016865°W	City	Education, Music & Theater, Performers, Women
Martin R. Delany (1812-1885)		May 11, 1995	5 PPG Place, 3rd Avenue & Market Street, Pittsburgh; 40.43948°N 80.00325°W	City	African American, Civil War, Military, Professions & Vocations, Publishing
Mary Cassatt (1844-1926)		May 22, 2004	Allegheny and Ridge Avenues, in park, Allegheny Avenue & I-376 on-ramp, North Side (Pittsburgh); 40.44937°N 80.01809°W	City	Artists, Women
Mary Harris "Mother" Jones		October 4, 2003	Northeast corner of 9th and Amity Streets, (at former municipal building), Homestead; 40.40654°N 79.91016°W	City	Government & Politics 20th Century, Labor, Steel, Women
Mary Lou Williams (1910-1981)		November 30, 1996	Lincoln Elementary School, Frankstown Road, Larimer (Pittsburgh); 40.46°N 79.91209°W	City	African American, Music & Theater, Performers, Women
McClurg Iron Foundry		May 16, 2016	Fifth Avenue, just west of Smithfield Street (Pittsburgh); 40.440252°N 79.998955°W	City	Buildings, Business & Industry, Military, War of 1812
McKees Rocks Mound		May 18, 2002	Rangers Field, Shingiss & Sproul Streets. The Bottoms, McKees Rocks; 40.47301°N 80.05156°W	City	Native American
Mercy Hospital		May 27, 1994	1400 Locust Street, Pittsburgh; 40.43665°N 79.98489°W	City	Education, Professions & Vocations, Religion, Women
Michael A. Musmanno (1897-1968)		October 11, 1993	1321 Island Avenue (PA 51), Stowe Township; 40.48241°N 80.06998°W	Roadside	Government & Politics, Government & Politics 20th Century, Writers
Monongahela River Navigation System		June 18, 2012	Elizabeth Lock & Dam, Bunola River Road, Elizabeth; 40.262597°N 79.900161°W	Roadside	Business & Industry, Coal, Government & Politics 19th Century, Iron & Steel, Navigation, Transportation
Mooncrest Historic District		April 15, 2004	Mooncrest Drive at Old Thorn Run Road, Moon Twp. 40.521625°N 80.191103°W	City	Business & Industry, Government & Politics 20th Century, Labor, Military, Military Post-Civil War
National Negro Opera Company		September 25, 1994	7101 Apple Street, Homewood (Pittsburgh); 40.4642°N 79.89571°W	City	African American, Music & Theater
National Tube Works		January 15, 1991	575 Lysle Boulevard (PA 148), at subway entrance to plant, McKeesport; 40.35215°N 79.8604°W	City	Business & Industry, Oil & Gas
Neville House		August 12, 1947	PA 50 just south of Woodville, Heidelberg; 40.37939°N 80.09621°W	Roadside	American Revolution, Houses & Homesteads, Military, Whiskey Rebellion
Old St. Luke's Church		July 14, 2001	330 Old Washington Pike & Church Street, Scott Township; 40.38449°N 80.09067°W	Roadside	Buildings, Early Settlement, French & Indian War, Military, Religion, Whiskey Rebellion
Out of This Furnace		September 28, 2023	Corner of Braddock Ave and 13th Street, Braddock 40.397187°N 79.859715°W	City	Ethnic & Immigration, Writers, Iron & Steel, Labor
Pauline Hanauer Rosenberg (1863-1940)		May 24, 2022	Rosenberg's former residence, 417 Lockhart St., Pittsburgh 40.452245°N 80.000537°W	City	Civil Rights, Ethnic & Immigration, Women
Pennsylvania Canal		December 1, 1958	Liberty Avenue at 11th Street (at the Pennsylvanian), Pittsburgh; 40.44398°N 79.99289°W	City	Canals, Navigation, Transportation
Pioneer Short-Wave Station		November 2, 1997	Barclay Avenue, off Greensburg Pike, Forest Hills; 40.41831°N 79.84138°W	City	Business & Industry
Pittsburgh		December 21, 1946	PA 51 at south city line, near Stewart Avenue (MISSING)	Roadside	Cities & Towns, Early Settlement, Forts, Government & Politics, Steel
Pittsburgh		December 18, 1946	4675 Steubenville Pike (PA 60) at West Steuben Street, at bridge and Sharp Edge Creekhouse restaurant, Thornburg; 40.44041°N 80.08066°W	Roadside	Cities & Towns, Early Settlement, Forts, Government & Politics, Steel
Pittsburgh		December 23, 1946	PA 65 (Ohio River Boulevard), north city line (MISSING)	Roadside	Cities & Towns, Early Settlement, Forts, Government & Politics, Steel
Pittsburgh		December 18, 1946	US 30 (Ardmore Boulevard) westbound at park, Forest Hills; 40.423907°N 79.857575°W -->	Roadside	Cities & Towns, Early Settlement, Forts, Government & Politics, Steel
Pittsburgh		December 18, 1946	PA 8 & PA 28, Millvale (MISSING)	Roadside	Cities & Towns, Early Settlement, Forts, Government & Politics, Steel
Pittsburgh		December 21, 1946	Perrysville Road (US 19), near St. Benedict's Academy, north of city line (MISSING)	Roadside	Cities & Towns
Pittsburgh		December 18, 1946	PA 65 at north city line (MISSING)	Roadside	Cities & Towns
Pittsburgh		December 18, 1946	US 19 north of city line (MISSING)	Roadside	Cities & Towns
Pittsburgh Agreement (The)		May 31, 2001	Penn Avenue & 7th Street, Pittsburgh; 40.44312°N 80.000314°W	City	Ethnic & Immigration, Government & Politics 20th Century
Pittsburgh Chinatown		April 16, 2022	520 3rd Ave., Pittsburgh	City	Asian Pacific American, Ethnic & Immigration
Pittsburgh Glass Works		October 2, 1997	Foot of Duquesne Incline, West Carson Street, Pittsburgh; 40.43986°N 80.0174°W	City	Business & Industry, Glass
Pittsburgh Grease Plant		September 18, 2000	33rd Street & Smallman Street, Strip District (Pittsburgh); 40.46258°N 79.96909°W	City	Business & Industry, Military, Military Post-Civil War, Oil & Gas, Transportation
Pittsburgh Plate Glass Company		October 19, 1983	Plaza of PPG Place, between 4th Avenue & Market Square, Pittsburgh; 40.44017°N 80.00288°W	City	Business & Industry, Glass
Pittsburgh Platform		October 10, 2007	Stockton Avenue at Concordia Club, East Park (North Side), Pittsburgh; 40.4509°N 80.0019°W	City	Religion
Polish Army		April 3, 1960	Polish Falcons, 97 South 18th Street, South Side Flats (Pittsburgh); 40.428158°N 79.980289°W	City	Ethnic & Immigration, Military, Military Post-Civil War
Presston		August 22, 2009	Ohio & Center Streets, Presston, Stowe Township; 40.482711°N 80.062904°W	Roadside	Ethnic & Immigration, Government & Politics 20th Century, Labor, Steel
Queen Aliquippa		October 26, 2003	2928 Highland Avenue, Highland Grove Park, near 2918 Bowman Avenue, McKeesport; 40.35983°N 79.83326°W	Roadside	French & Indian War, George Washington, Government & Politics 18th Century, Military, Native American, Women
Rachel Carson		May 20, 1988	Pittsburgh Street at Colfax Street, Springdale; 40.54105°N 79.78399°W	City	Environment, Medicine & Science, Women, Writers
Radio Station KDKA		November 30, 1990	KDKA Headquarters, 1 Gateway Center, Pittsburgh; 40.44255°N 80.00543°W	City	Business & Industry
Railroad Strike of 1877		September 23, 1997	Liberty Avenue at 28th Street (on traffic island), Strip District (Pittsburgh); 40.45618°N 79.97491°W	City	Labor, Railroads, Transportation
Richard L. "Dick" Thornburgh (1932-2020)		September 2, 2023	Corner of Kings Highway and Rosslyn Road, Rosslyn Farms Borough 40.425924°N 80.094183°W	Roadside	Governors, Government & Politics 20th Century
Robert Lee Vann (1879-1940)		July 13, 1997	Center Avenue, at Francis Street, Hill District (Pittsburgh); 40.447057°N 79.967413°W	City	African American, Government & Politics, Government & Politics 20th Century, Professions & Vocations, Publishing
Salk Polio Vaccine		April 12, 2005	Salk Hall, University of Pittsburgh, Terrace Street at Sutherland Drive (across from Peterson Events Ctr.), Oakland (Pittsburgh); 40.442763°N 79.96209°W	Roadside	Invention, Medicine & Science
Shadyside Iron Furnace		December 1, 1958	Southeast corner of Bayard Street & Amberson Avenue, at Winchester-Thurston High School field, Shadyside (Pittsburgh); 40.4521°N 79.94173°W	City	Business & Industry, Furnaces, Iron
Shannopin's Town		December 1, 1958	40th Street Bridge (west side), Lawrenceville (Pittsburgh); 40.46953°N 79.96358°W	City	Early Settlement, Native American
Shousetown Boatyard		June 14, 1987	McGovern Boulevard (PA 51) near Spring Run Road, Honor Roll Park, across from fire department, Glenwillard/Crescent Township; 40.55716°N 80.22081°W	City	Business & Industry, Transportation
Simon Girty (1741-1818)		September 30, 2017	At Turner cemetery, next to Methodist church, 3424 Beechwood Blvd., Pittsburgh 40.42086°N 79.92732°W	Roadside	American Revolution, French & Indian War, Military, Native American
Sisters of Mercy		December 21, 1993	800 Penn Avenue, Cultural District, (Pittsburgh); 40.443448°N 79.999158°W	City	Ethnic & Immigration, Religion, Women
Site of the Western Penitentiary - PLAQUE		1931	Eagle enclosure at the National Aviary, North Side (Pittsburgh); 40.4532°N 80.01015°W	Plaque	Civil War, Military, Police and Safety
St. Nicholas Roman Catholic Croatian Church, North Side		June 20, 2015	E Ohio St. (PA 28), just S of 31st St. bridge, Pittsburgh 40.45861°N 79.98667°W	Roadside	Buildings & Architecture, Ethnic & Immigration, Religion
Standard Chemical Company		January 1, 2018	Allen Hall, 3941 O'Hara St., at entrance across from Thackeray Ave., University of Pittsburgh 40.44449°N 79.95828°W	City	Business & Industry, Professions & Vocations, Science & Medicine
Station WQED		August 20, 1964	4802 5th Avenue, Oakland (Pittsburgh); 40.44717°N 79.94453°W	City	Business & Industry, Education, Motion Pictures & Television
Steamboat "New Orleans"		October 15, 2011	First Avenue at Try Street, Pittsburgh; 40.435567°N 79.996250°W	City	Business & Industry, Exploration, Navigation, Transportation
Stephen C. Foster		July 4, 1976	3600 Penn Avenue, at homestead (behind fence), Lawrenceville (Pittsburgh); 40.46415°N 79.96374°W	Roadside	Music & Theater
Stephen C. Foster Memorial		December 1, 1958	Forbes Avenue just east of Bigelow Boulevard, Oakland (Pittsburgh); 40.44354°N 79.95256°W	City	Music & Theater, Writers
Three Rivers Stadium		November 26, 2007	Art Rooney Avenue, near North Shore Drive, Heinz Field, North Shore (Pittsburgh); 40.44602°N 80.01387°W	Roadside	Baseball, Football, Sports
Union Local 471 American Federation of Musicians		June 23, 2012	Crawford Avenue at Webster Avenue, Hill District (Pittsburgh); 40.443100°N 79.987400°W	Roadside	African American, Labor, Music & Theater, Performers
United Steelworkers of America		June 17, 1986	4th Avenue & Grant Street, Pittsburgh; 40.437941°N 79.997501°W	City	Government & Politics 20th Century, Labor, Steel
University of Pittsburgh		November 2, 1979	Southeast corner, 5th Avenue & Bigelow Boulevard, Oakland (Pittsburgh); 40.44444°N 79.95452°W	City	Education
V.F.W.		September 16, 1967	5th Avenue & Bigelow Boulevard, at Wm. Pitt Union by bus stop, Oakland, Pittsburgh; 40.44416°N 79.95458°W	City	Military, Military Post-Civil War
Victor Herbert (1859-1924)		August 28, 2010	4400 Forbes Avenue, at Carnegie Mus. near Shakespeare statue, Oakland (Pittsburgh); 40.443587°N 79.951356°W	City	Ethnic & Immigration, Performers
Westinghouse Atom Smasher		June 3, 2005	North Avenue at F Avenue, Forest Hills; 40.410474°N 79.842308°W	City	Environment, Invention, Science & Medicine
Westinghouse Electric Corporation		October 1, 1986	Westinghouse Plaza by First Niagara Building, Pittsburgh; 40.439350°N 80.006217°W	City	Business & Industry, Electricity
Westinghouse Gas Wells		November 30, 2016	Westinghouse Park, Thomas Blvd & N Murtland St., Pittsburgh 40.45249°N 79.90436°W	Roadside	Business & Industry, Environment, Invention, Oil & Gas
Westinghouse Railroad Air Brake		July 23, 2011	Liberty Avenue at 25th Street at Opera House, Strip District (Pittsburgh); 40.45334°N 79.979277°W	City	Invention, Railroads, Transportation
William "Billy" Strayhorn (1915-1967)		May 27, 1995	1101 North Murtland Street, at Westinghouse High School, Homewood (Pittsburgh); 40.4606°N 79.9003°W	City	African American, Music & Theater
William D. Boyce (1858-1929)		June 11, 1960	595 Beatty Road, Boyce Campus of Community College of Allegheny County, Monroeville; 40.45407°N 79.75371°W	Roadside	Education
William T. Kerr (1868-1953)		June 12, 1992	4 Columbia Avenue at Noblestown Road, at bus stop, Rennersdale; 40.39809°N 80.14012°W	Roadside	Government & Politics, Government & Politics 20th Century
Work Accidents and the Law (1910)		April 28, 2008	Market Square, Pittsburgh; 40.440488°N 80.002669°W	City	Business & Industry, Government & Politics 20th Century, Labor, Women, Writers
Yohogania Courthouse		June 10, 1948	PA 837 southwest of West Elizabeth; 40.261517°N 79.911650°W	Roadside	Government & Politics, Government & Politics 18th Century

== See also ==
- List of Pennsylvania state historical markers
- National Register of Historic Places listings in Allegheny County, Pennsylvania
- National Register of Historic Places listings in Pittsburgh, Pennsylvania
- List of City of Pittsburgh historic designations
- List of Pittsburgh History and Landmarks Foundation Historic Landmarks
