= Van Kirk =

Van Kirk may refer to:

- Theodore Van Kirk (1921–2014), United States Air Force officer and navigator
- Van Kirk Farm, historic farm in Elizabeth Township, Allegheny County, Pennsylvania
