= Mooncrest =

Mooncrest may refer to:

- Mooncrest Records, a UK-based record label
- Mooncrest Historic District, a historic district in Pennsylvania
- Mooncrest, Alberta, township within Edmonton, Canada
