= Boyce station =

- Boyce Station
- U.S. National Register of Historic Places
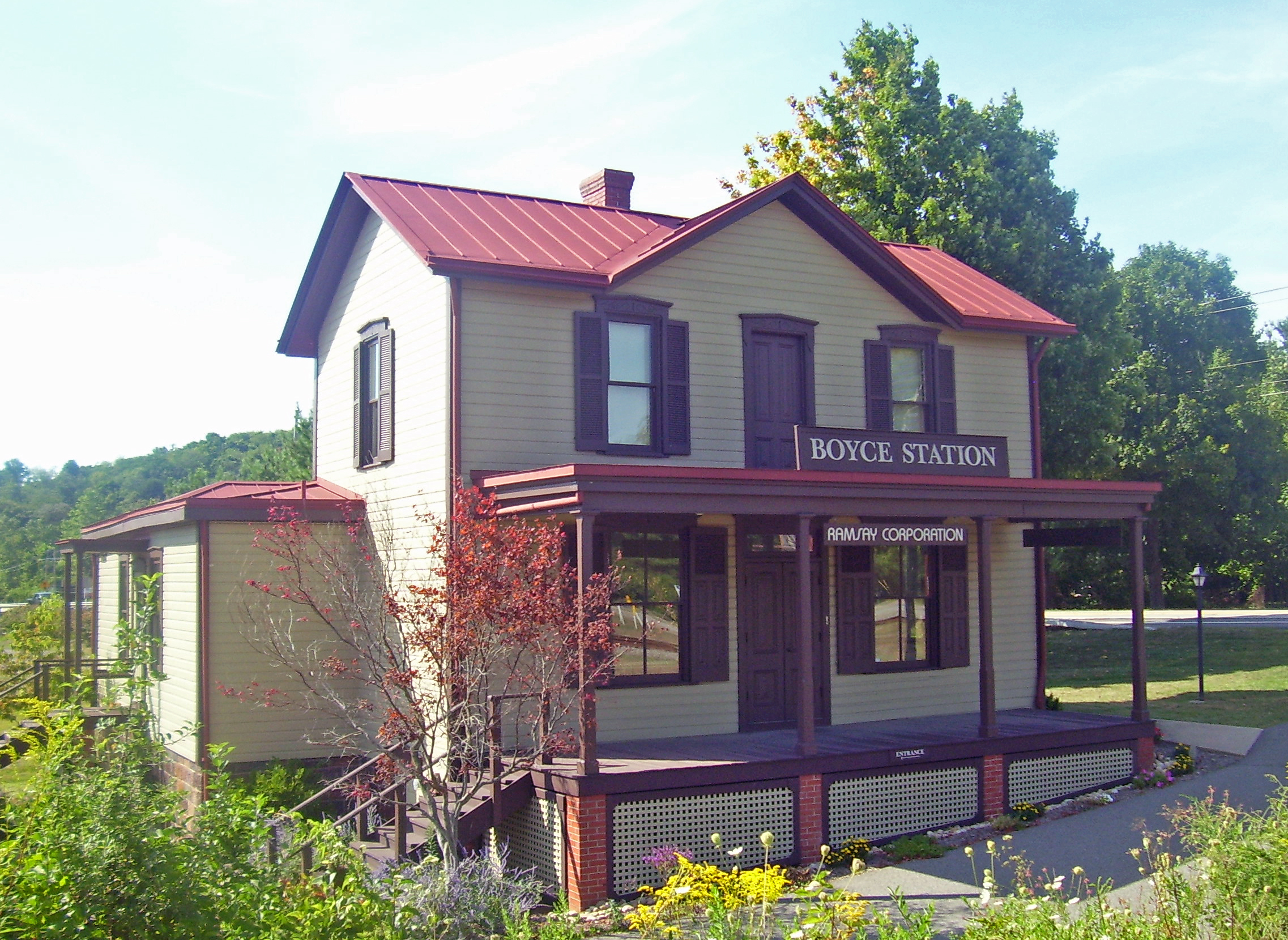
- East elevation and south profile, 2008
- Location: Upper St. Clair, PA
- Nearest city: Pittsburgh
- Coordinates: 40°19′5″N 80°6′49″W
- Built: ca. 1900
- NRHP reference No.: 82001528
- Added to NRHP: 1982

Boyce station is a disused train station located at the junction of Boyce Road and the tracks of the Chartiers Branch in Upper St. Clair, Pennsylvania, United States. It was built in 1900, and housed not only the rail operations but a post office and general store for the small community it served.

After falling vacant when traffic on the line declined and the rise of the automobile made the surrounding less dependent on the commercial operations and passenger rail service, it was restored in 1980. It is the only intact example of a rail station in the Pittsburgh area that served as a local commercial center. It was listed on the National Register of Historic Places in 1982.

== Building ==
The T-shaped frame building on a concrete block foundation is two stories high and three bays wide, with a one-story addition on the southwest. It has a cross-gabled roof of seamed tin with a plain cornice.

A 32-foot (9.8 m) porch runs the length of the front (east) facade. Its flat tin roof is supported by four square chamfered wood posts. Its deck is on brick piers. There is another, smaller porch of similar material in the northwest corner of the building. The windows and doors (in the middle of both stories) are all trimmed with flat boards and incised board with shallow pedimented top. The windows all have shutters.

Inside, both stories have three rooms apiece, all of which retain many of their original features. The southwest addition contains an entrance foyer, bathroom and office.

== History ==
It took several decades to build a rail line down the Chartiers Creek valley and connect Pittsburgh and Washington. Service between the two cities began in 1871 with mixed freight and passenger trains. During the next decade, coal, oil and gas extraction began in earnest in Washington County, driving up traffic on the line and forcing the railroad to start running separate freight and passenger service. The Pittsburgh, St. Louis and Cincinnati Railway, then the owners of the line, began to improve its facilities.

By 1900, it was necessary to add a second track. The Boyce Station was built around this time. The rail business remained profitable until the mid-20th century, when trucking began to draw away freight traffic and automobiles travel became the preferred choice for travelers in Western Pennsylvania. The last passenger train stopped at Boyce in 1952.

The line ultimately became property of the Penn Central, which neglected it as it fell into bankruptcy. The second track was eventually removed. Conrail took it over, and when that concern was dismantled by the federal government it eventually passed to its current owner, the Pittsburgh and Ohio Central Railroad, a short line operator.

The station declined along with the railroad until 1980, when it was purchased by Roland Ramsay, a corporate psychologist who found it an ideal location for a new consulting business he had started. He began to learn about the building's historic status, and eventually had it renovated to reflect its historical appearance and successfully nominated it to the National Register. His company is still located there.

== See also ==
- National Register of Historic Places listings in Allegheny County, Pennsylvania

Preceding station	Pennsylvania Railroad	Following station
Hills toward Washington	Chartiers Branch	Mayview toward Pittsburgh
