= Gilfillan Farm =

- U.S. National Register of Historic Places
- Pittsburgh Landmark – PHLF
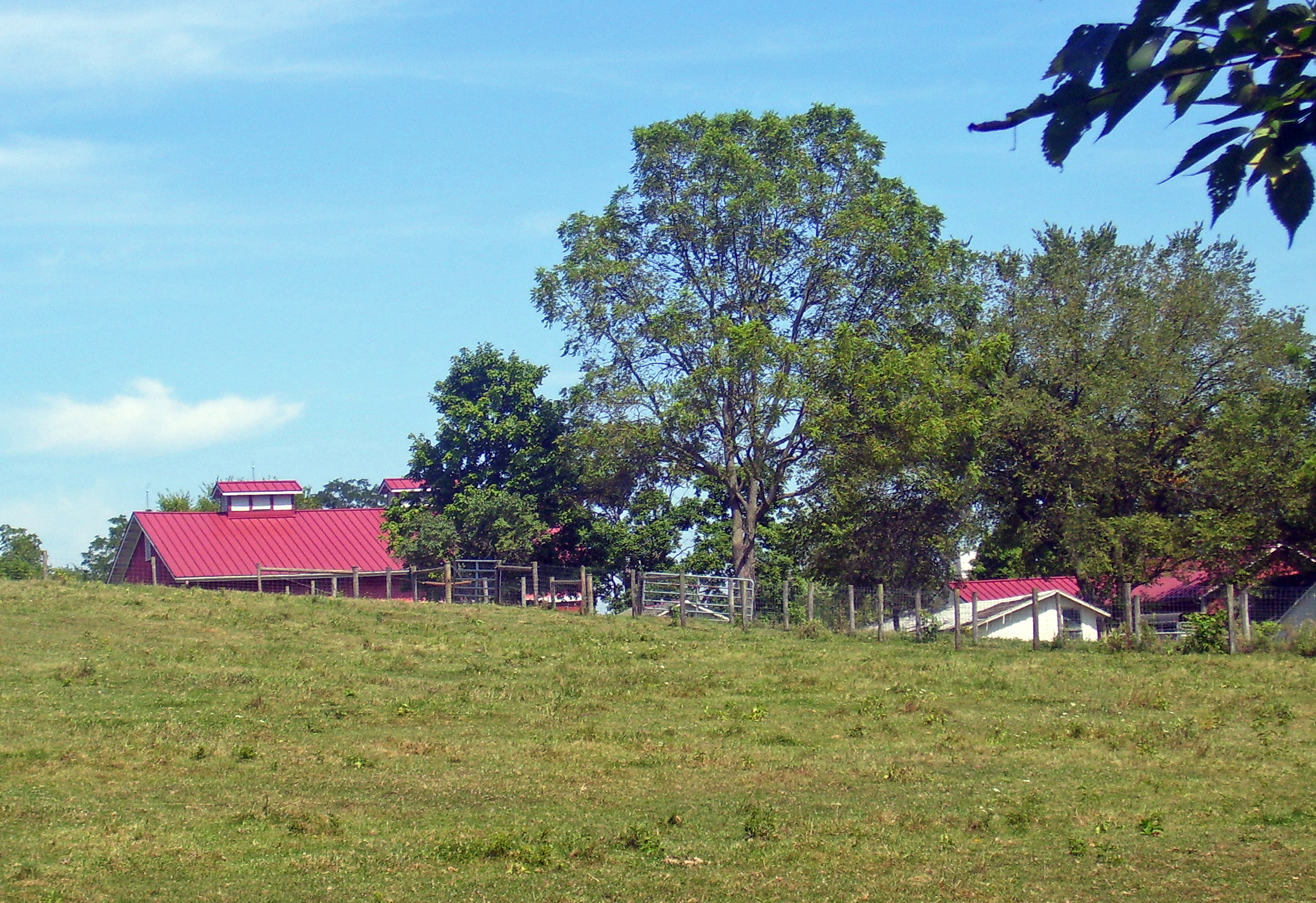
- Farm in 2008 from Boyce Road to south

- Location within Pennsylvania Location within the United States
- Location: Upper St. Clair Township, Allegheny County, Pennsylvania
- Nearest city: Pittsburgh
- Coordinates: 40.342°N 80.064°W
- Area: 15 acres (6.1 ha)
- Built: ca. 1850
- Architectural style: Greek Revival, Victorian
- NRHP reference No.: 79002155

Significant dates
- Added to NRHP: November 20, 1979
- Designated PHLF: 2001

Gilfillan Farm is located at the junction of Washington (U.S. Route 19) and Orr roads in Upper St. Clair Township, Allegheny County, Pennsylvania, United States. It is a working farm whose current form dates to the mid-19th century.

The farm's main house shows the transition from the Greek Revival style to the Victorian modes that became dominant later in the century. It remained a farm in the hands of the same family until 2001, even as the area around it has become a suburb of nearby Pittsburgh. In 1979 it was listed on the National Register of Historic Places, and is currently owned by the township's historical society.

== Property ==
The farmstead consists of 12 buildings on a 15-acre (6.1 ha) parcel of land sloping gently to the west. Washington Road is to the east, Orr Road to the south, and a 60-acre (24 ha) township park is on the north. The South Hills Village shopping mall is a short distance north on the opposite side of Washington. There are sidewalks on the streets and the property itself is fenced off.

The main house is a two-story, three-bay structure of brick painted red. It is topped with a slate-shingled gabled roof. There is a large wing on the rear that has had an addition put on. A nearby stone springhouse is the oldest building on the farm.

Windows have decorative wooden lintels and white pine moldings. A porch supported by wooden columns stretches across the west (front) of the first story. The main entrance has a red glass transom and similar sidelights with a frosted grape pattern.

Inside many original finishings remain. The doors have white pine molded surrounds like their exterior counterparts, and one of the parlors has a fireplace mantel also of pine. Slate and marble are used for the other two fireplaces on the first story.

A breezeway connects the main house to a brick wash house to its rear. It is also three bays but only one story high. To its rear is a smokehouse.

Also nearby is a 40-by-60-foot (12 by 18 m) frame barn on a stone foundation. Its roof is pierced by two ventilators. Next to it is the stable, with stalls for seven horses. A wagon shed, shop, pig pen, chicken coop and granary round out the outbuildings.

== History ==
The farm was established by Alexander Gilfillan in the 1760s. His family was one of the first to settle in the future township, growing corn, hay, sheep and cattle. His grandson, John II, built the current farm complex from 1857 to 1868. The last building, the barn, was built in a community barn raising.

In 1976 the family sold the surrounding acreage to the township, which have since been developed as a park with a 1.25-mile (2.01 km) walking trail. The Gilfillan descendants continued to live on and work the farm until the last one died in 2001. Margaret Gilfillan left the property to the Historical Society of Upper St. Clair http://www.hsusc.org/ along with a $1.8 million trust fund to maintain it. Currently it is open to the public by appointment or on Upper St. Clair Community Day, in May of every year and the grounds are selectively available for private parties.

== See also ==
- National Register of Historic Places listings in Allegheny County, Pennsylvania
