= Yohogania County, Virginia =

Former county in Virginia

Coordinates: 40.262°N 79.387°W

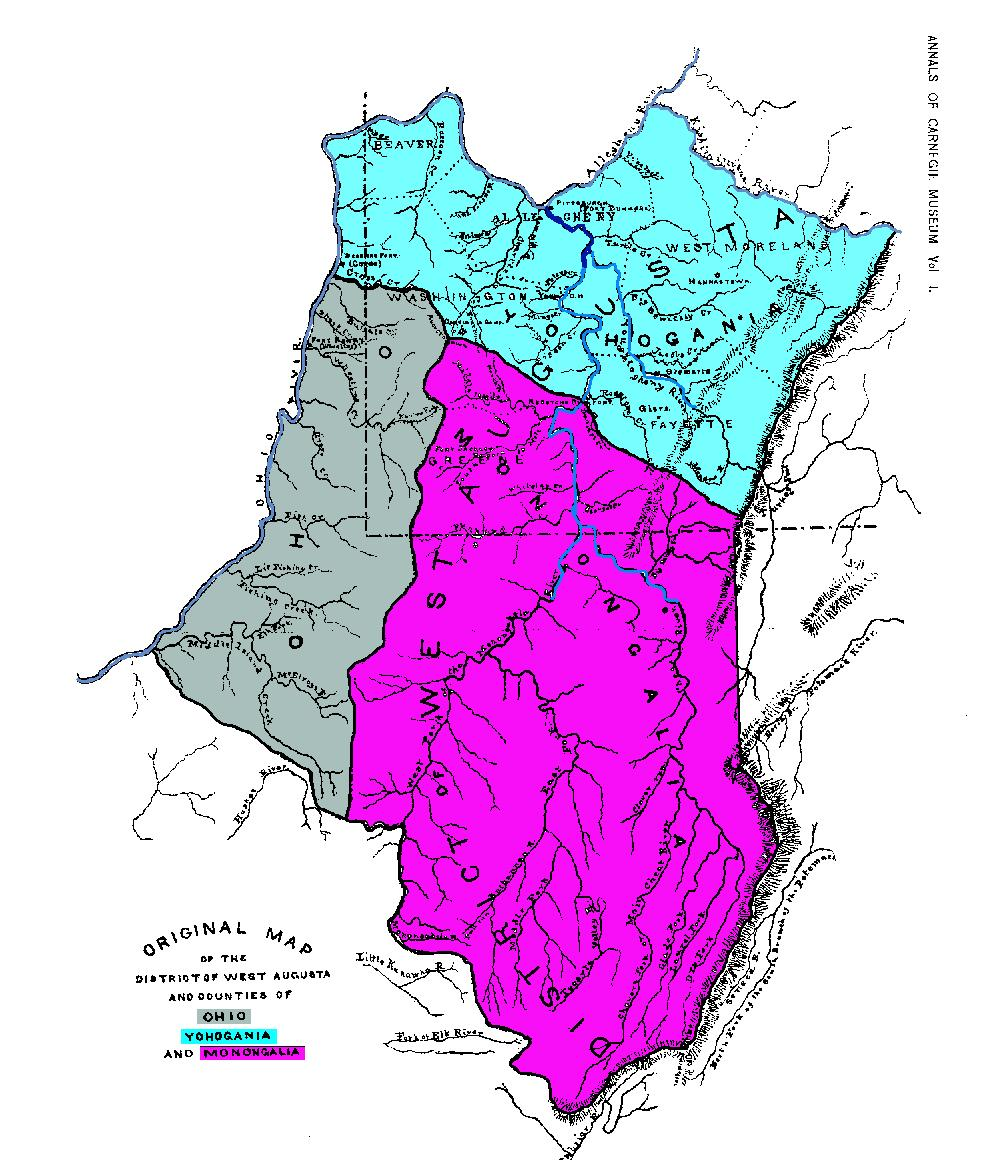
Map of Monongalia County in present-day West Virginia and Yohogania County in present-day Virginia; Yohogania County is in light blue.

Yohogania County was created by the new state of Virginia in 1776, in an area long disputed between Virginia and Pennsylvania. The county ceased to exist after the border dispute between the two states was resolved in the 1780s. Thus, it is sometimes referred to as a "lost county," although 1.5 million people live within the territory it once claimed, which encompasses two entire counties and parts of four others in two states.

The problem arose through the complex and conflicting manner of granting territory and defining boundaries during the Colonial period. The North American continent was not surveyed until long after various land grants were made to individual colonies, and such land grants and even governmental entities frequently overlapped.

== Conflicting claims ==
Virginia's claim was for a wedge from their coastal area all the way to the Pacific Ocean. Pennsylvania's was for five degrees of longitude west of the Delaware River. By the 1770s it was obvious that the two claims overlapped, in the area that in 1773 had been designated by Pennsylvania as Westmoreland County, because settlers were moving into the area from both directions. Both claims included the entire southwestern corner of what is now Pennsylvania, west of the Laurel Ridge in the Allegheny Mountains and south of the Kiskiminetas, Allegheny, and Ohio rivers. The major prize location was the confluence of the Allegheny and Monongahela rivers, forming the Ohio River, at the location of Fort Pitt, now the city of Pittsburgh. The disputes over which colony had authority over the area led to overlapping land grants to settlers and battles between Virginians and Pennsylvanians in the period 1774–1775. In 1774, a Virginian militia group even attacked and captured the Westmoreland County seat at Hannastown and arrested three Westmoreland County justices who refused to acknowledge the jurisdiction of Virginia.

Similar conflicts between Maryland and Pennsylvania had been resolved earlier, by 1767, through the work of two men chosen by Cecil Calvert, brother of Charles Calvert, 5th Baron Baltimore, proprietor of Maryland, and Thomas Penn and his brother Richard, sons of William Penn and proprietors of Pennsylvania. Astronomer Charles Mason, an acquaintance of Benjamin Franklin, and surveyor Jeremiah Dixon came from England to do this work. The line they located has since been known as the Mason–Dixon line or Mason and Dixon's Line. However, their authority extended west only as far as western Maryland, and did not resolve border conflicts between Virginia and Pennsylvania.

== Creation of Yohogania County ==
In 1776, shortly after the American Revolutionary War began, the Virginia General Assembly formed three new counties from the District of West Augusta, an area of Augusta County, Virginia, which encompassed much of what is now northern West Virginia and southwestern Pennsylvania. These were Monongalia County, Ohio County, and Yohogania County. All three included, or at least claimed, land in what is now Pennsylvania as well as in Virginia, now West Virginia. The new counties were named after rivers in the region, the Ohio, the Monongahela, and the Youghiogheny, the latter two being Latinized to create the county names. The county seat of Yohogania County was near the Monongahela River, within the present borough of Jefferson Hills across from Elizabeth.

On December 27, 1779, a resolution by the Second Continental Congress recommended to the two now-states of Virginia and Pennsylvania that, rather than continue to quarrel with each other as well as fighting the British, they should reach an agreement on the border situation. This was done in theory by an agreement reached by commissioners from both states in Baltimore in 1779, and ratified by the legislatures of both states in 1780, "to extend the line commonly called Mason and Dixon's line five degrees of longitude from Delaware River ... and from the western termination thereof to run and mark a meridian line to the Ohio River," which was the northern boundary of Virginia's claim. That would be the boundary between the two states.

The conflict apparently being over, Pennsylvania carved Washington and Fayette counties out of Westmoreland in 1781 and 1783, respectively. These counties contained land claimed by Yohogania and Ohio or (in Fayette's case) Monongalia counties. But confusion over jurisdictions continued.

== Boundary survey ==
On November 4, 1782, Colonel Joseph Neville, representing Virginia, and Alexander McClean of Pennsylvania marked a temporary line. A final, permanent survey was performed by Neville and Andrew Ellicott, a Marylander representing Virginia. The corner was marked late in 1784—the report to the commissioners of both states being dated November 18, 1784—and on August 23, 1785, the boundary as far north as the Ohio River (near present-day East Liverpool, Ohio) was completed. In 1786 the line was continued to Lake Erie, marking the boundary between Pennsylvania and the portion of the Northwest Territory that in 1803 became the state of Ohio. (Virginia's claim to the Northwest Territory had been ceded to Congress in 1784.)

The survey determined that parts of Ohio and Monongalia counties and nearly all of Yohogania County were within the Pennsylvania boundaries. The areas of Yohogania County ceded to Pennsylvania included all of present-day Westmoreland County and parts of the present counties of Allegheny, Beaver, Washington, and Fayette. The portion of Yohogania remaining in (West) Virginia's Northern Panhandle—itself a creation of the border settlement—was deemed too small at the time to form a county, and was annexed to Ohio County. (Similarly, part of Ohio County's claim is now in Washington and Greene Counties in Pennsylvania, and parts of what had been considered Monongalia County are in Washington, Greene, and Fayette counties, Pennsylvania.) In 1797, Virginia created Brooke County from the northern portion of Ohio County. Later, as the population of the region continued to grow, Hancock County was created from the northern portion of Brooke County in 1848, with the county line being drawn through the middle of the village of Hollidays Cove, now Weirton.

== Reorganization of local government after resolution of boundary dispute ==
Allegheny County was formed in 1788 from Westmoreland and Washington counties. Most of the present territory of Allegheny County, including most of Pittsburgh (with the notable exception of what is now the northside (Pittsburgh), formerly its own municipality Allegheny City), was once claimed by Yohogania. Beaver County was created in 1800 from parts of Allegheny and Washington. The southern part, known locally as "South Side Beaver" because it is south of the Ohio River, was once claimed by Yohogania. (Greene County, formed in 1796 from Washington, does not include any territory once claimed by Yohogania but was once claimed by Ohio and Monongalia counties.)

The part of Yohogania that remained in Virginia was from Cross Creek north. This creek is just south of the present-day town of Follansbee, West Virginia, entering the Ohio River across from Mingo Junction, Ohio. In 1791, this remnant area was made part of the newly created Brooke County, Virginia, though the southern part of Brooke, including the county seat, Wellsburg, had been part of Ohio County. In 1848, the northern half of Brooke—roughly two-thirds of the Yohogania remnant—became Hancock County, Virginia. On June 20, 1863, both Brooke and Hancock, as well as Ohio and Monongalia (and the counties since formed from Ohio and Monongalia) became part of the new state of West Virginia.

== See also ==
- List of former counties, cities, and towns of Virginia
