= Leet Township, Allegheny County, Pennsylvania =

Township in Pennsylvania, US

Coordinates: 40.5733°N 80.2098°W

Location in Allegheny County and state of Pennsylvania

Leet Township is a township in Allegheny County, Pennsylvania, United States. The population was 1,620 at the 2020 census. Leet Township includes the neighborhood of Fair Oaks and Leet Township's fire department includes the name "Fair Oaks Volunteer Fire Department".

== Geography ==
According to the United States Census Bureau, the township has a total area of 1.6 square miles (4.1 km^{2}), all land.

== Surrounding neighborhoods ==
Leet Township has five borders, including Bell Acres to the northeast, Edgeworth to the southeast, Leetsdale to the southwest, and the Beaver County neighborhoods of Ambridge and Harmony Township to the northwest.

== Government and politics ==
Presidential election results
| Year | Republican | Democratic | Third parties |
|---|---|---|---|
| 2020 | 43% 456 | 54% 574 | 1% 14 |
| 2016 | 48% 405 | 51% 425 | 1% 9 |
| 2012 | 53% 447 | 46% 390 | 1% 10 |

=== Council members ===
- [2017-2019] Republicans-1 (Janaszek), Multiparty-1 (Adipietro), Democrat-0, Unknown-3 (Bradel, Stepharsky, Besong)

== History ==
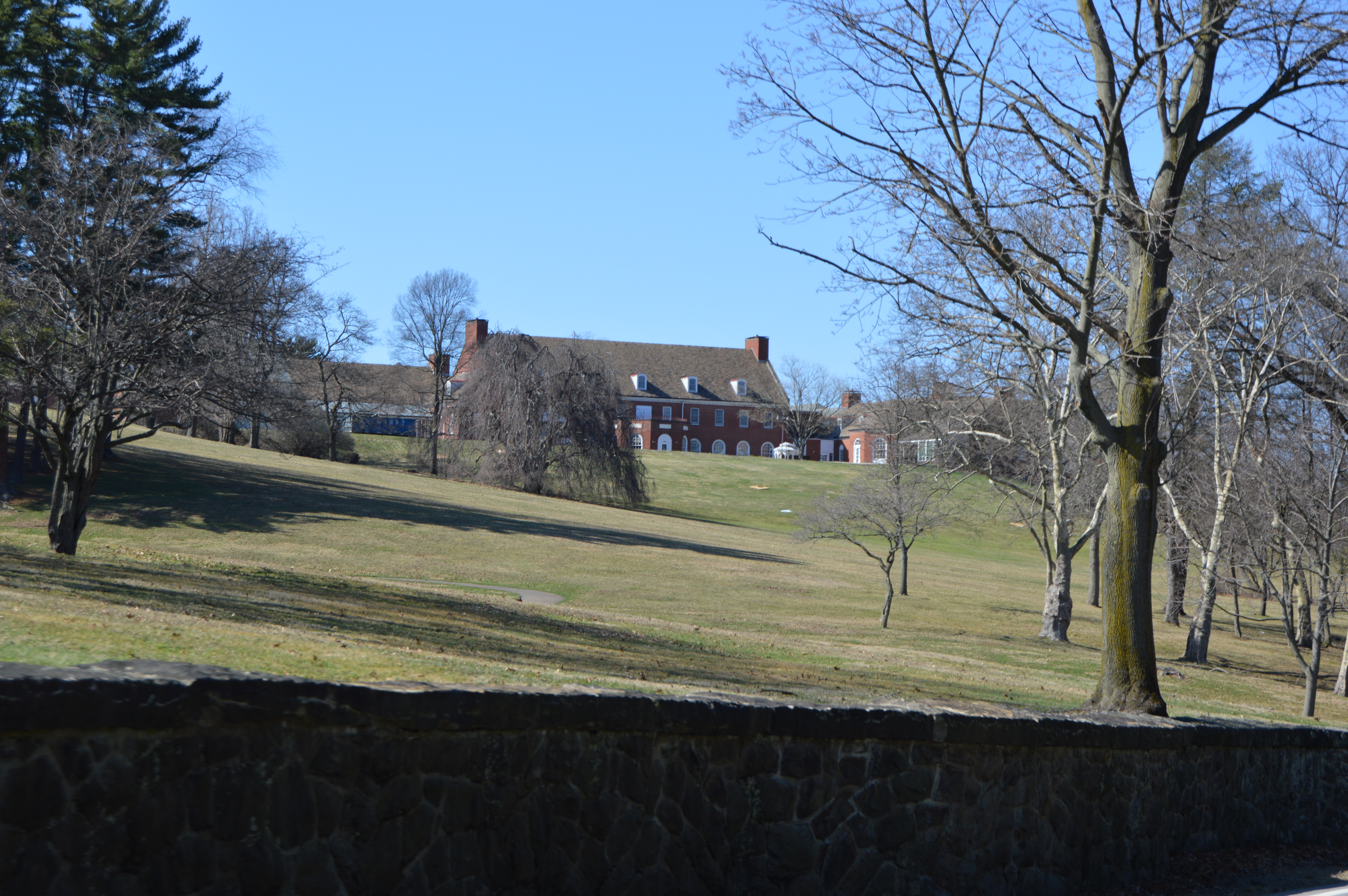
HealthSouth Rehabilitation Hospital

Originally part of Pitt Township and the Depreciation Lands, reserved for Revolutionary War veterans, it was named after Jonathan Leet, a surveyor who laid out the town of Beaver Falls.

Leet's brother, Daniel, also was a surveyor who bought several large lots in the area. Daniel Leet served on George Washington's staff during the Revolutionary War.

Gen. Alexander Hays, a Pittsburgher who named the Mexican War Streets on the present-day North Side after that conflict, named his Civil War horse "Leet" after the family. One of the Leet descendants, David Shields, served as Hays' personal aide during the Civil War. After Hays died at the Battle of the Wilderness, a family friend gave his wife, Annie, a home and five acres on Big Sewickley Creek, which she named "Fair Oaks" after the battle in which her husband was promoted.

The original boundaries of the township included what are now Edgeworth, Leetsdale and part of Sewickley Heights.

After the Civil War, the residents decided to file a petition to form a separate municipality because they were upset at the level of services they received from Sewickley Township. The votes were counted at the home of Justice of the Peace John Way Jr., grandson of one of original property owners in the area, Caleb Way, a Quaker.

== Demographics ==
Historical population
| Census | Pop. | Note | %± |
|---|---|---|---|
| 1970 | 1,646 | | — |
| 1980 | 1,854 | | 12.6% |
| 1990 | 1,731 | | −6.6% |
| 2000 | 1,568 | | −9.4% |
| 2010 | 1,634 | | 4.2% |
| 2020 | 1,620 | | −0.9% |
| 2022 (est.) | 1,582 | | −2.3% |
U.S. Decennial Census

At the 2000 census, there were 1,568 people, 569 households, and 452 families living in the township. The population density was 983.9 inhabitants per square mile (379.9/km^{2}). There were 599 housing units at an average density of 375.9 per square mile (145.1/km^{2}). The racial makeup of the township was 94.83% White, 2.68% African American, 0.96% Asian, 0.32% from other races, and 1.21% from two or more races. Hispanic or Latino of any race were 0.77%.

There were 569 households, 36.0% had children under the age of 18 living with them, 67.7% were married couples living together, 8.1% had a female householder with no husband present, and 20.4% were non-families. 17.8% of households were made up of individuals, and 8.1% were one person aged 65 or older. The average household size was 2.70 and the average family size was 3.08.

The age distribution was 24.7% under the age of 18, 6.6% from 18 to 24, 24.4% from 25 to 44, 29.3% from 45 to 64, and 14.9% 65 or older. The median age was 42 years. For every 100 females there were 92.2 males. For every 100 females age 18 and over, there were 93.1 males.

The median household income was $54,432 and the median family income was $62,292. Males had a median income of $46,635 versus $28,676 for females. The per capita income for the township was $26,415. About 2.8% of families and 3.8% of the population were below the poverty line, including 3.9% of those under age 18 and 6.5% of those age 65 or over.
