= John F. Singer House =

Historic house in Pennsylvania, United States

- U.S. National Register of Historic Places
- Pittsburgh Landmark – PHLF
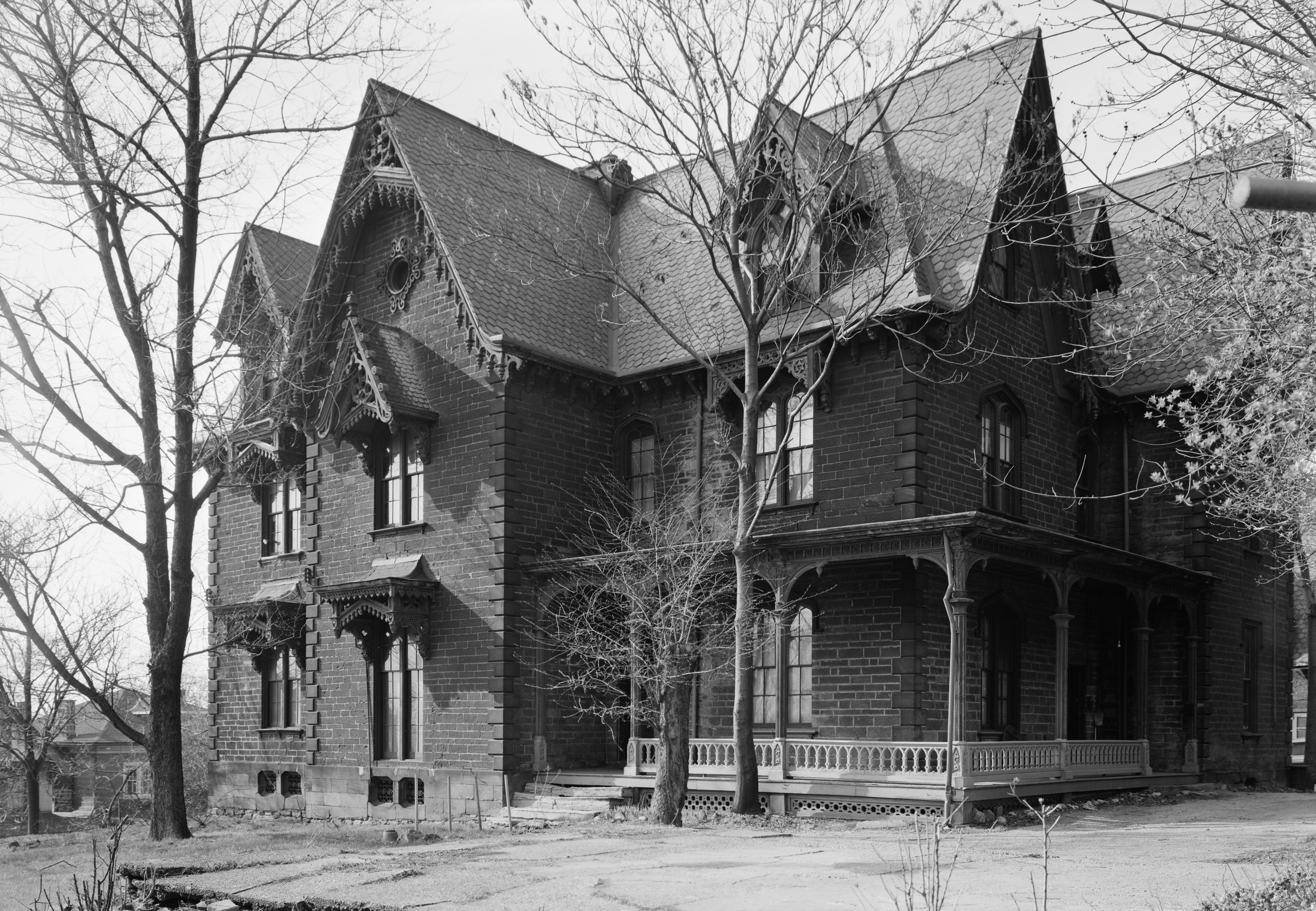
- Front of the house

- Location within Pennsylvania Location within the United States
- Location: 1318 Singer Pl., Wilkinsburg, Pennsylvania
- Coordinates: 40°26′48″N 79°52′56″W
- Built: 1865
- Architectural style: Gothic
- NRHP reference No.: 74001744

Significant dates
- Added to NRHP: November 13, 1974
- Designated PHLF: 2000

The John F. Singer House is a house in Wilkinsburg, Pennsylvania, United States, an east-side suburb of Pittsburgh. It was built for John F. Singer, who was made wealthy during the American Civil War by supplying the Union Army with iron and steel.

Described as "one of the most elaborate mansions built" in the nineteenth century, it was listed on the National Register of Historic Places in 1974.

== History ==
Located in Wilkinsburg, which is an east-side suburb of Pittsburgh, Pennsylvania, the John F. Singer House is a Gothic Revival-style house that was added to the National Register of Historic Places in 1974.

Built for John F. Singer, who was made wealthy during the American Civil War by supplying the Union Army with iron and steel, this structure may have been designed by architect Joseph W. Kerr. Begun in 1863 as a summer residence for Singer, this thirty-five-room stone house was initially situated on thirty-five acres of land. Completed in 1869, its construction cost roughly $65,000.

Atypical of Kerr's pattern-book designs, it was a far more ostentatious finished product than anything Kerr had previously done. Among the effects achieved by the plasterers, stonemasons and woodcarvers that Singers had brought in from Austria, Germany and England were "delicate natural motifs in low relief under each bay window" and hand-carved, hardwood vergeboards, according to the Society of Architectural Historians.

A cruciform-style design with four gables, multiple, ornate dormers, two crushed sandstone and gesso-dressed, mahogany porches, and front steps carved from Mexican slate, the design also incorporated an Italianate-tiled foyer. The architectural plans show that it was a spacious home which had a living room, breakfast room, dining room, kitchen, library, and guest room on the first floor, and five bedrooms, two bathrooms and a sitting room on the second floor.

Each of the eighteen rooms on the structure's first floor is characterized by its own unique marble mantel and is accented by mahogany doors and window frames.

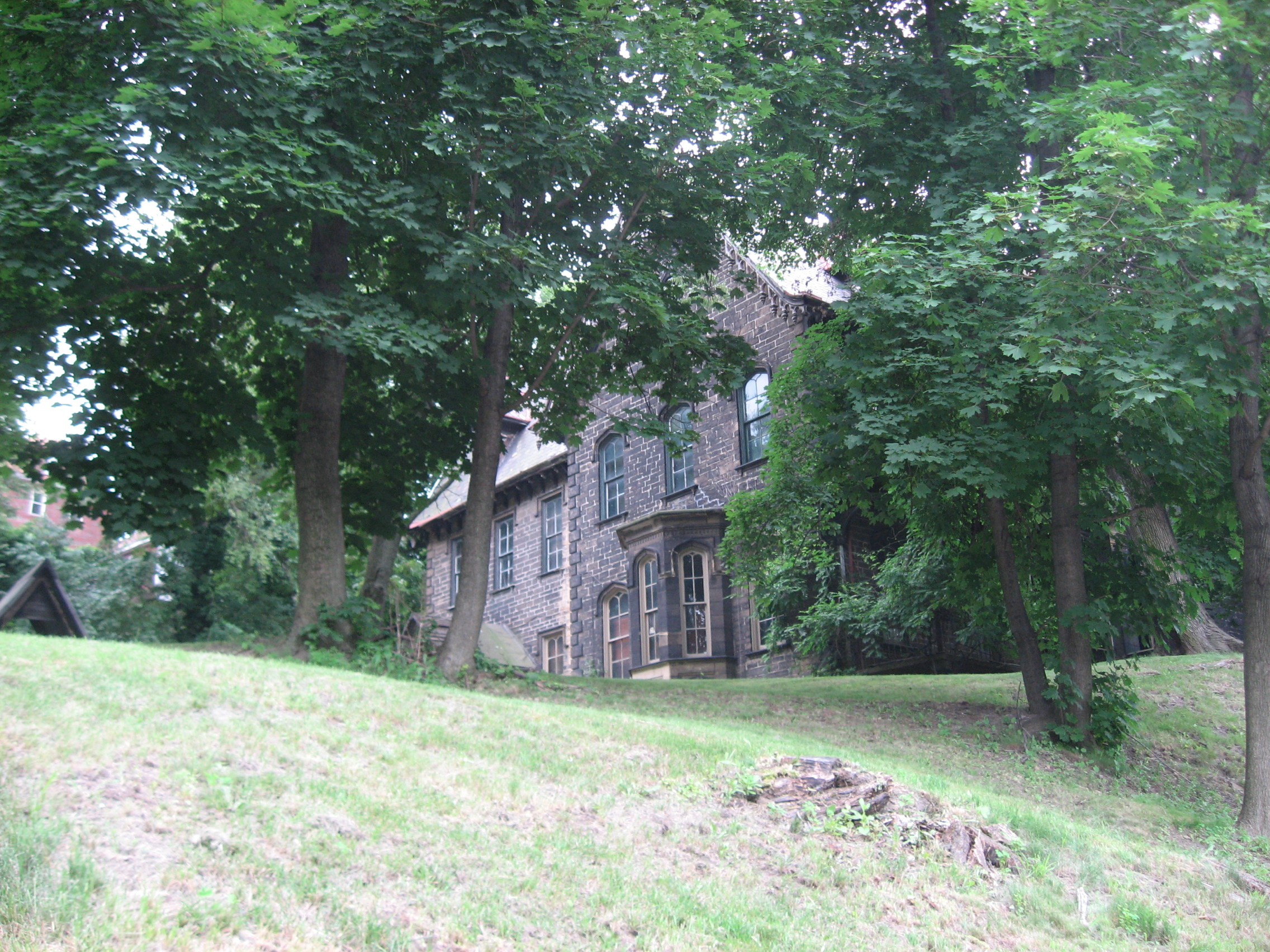
Street view of the John F. Singer House

The estate also initially included a gatehouse, carriage house, private Episcopal chapel, and an artificial lake that was one hundred and twenty-five feet wide and eight feet deep.

Singer then had his estate landscaped with gardens, an orchard and a vineyard.

Singer resided here with his wife and children until his death in 1872. During the resolution of his estate, his widow was awarded one-third of the property while his children were awarded the remaining two-thirds. Sometime after that, his widow and children moved out of the residence, but chose to leave clothing, jewelry, books, furniture, and other household items there, a significant number of which were stolen during a break-in by thieves at the home in 1875.

Following the death of Singer's widow, Mary (Snyder) Singer, in 1893, her one-third share of the property was awarded to Singer's children by way of a trust fund managed by the Safe Deposit & Trust Company.

Sometime after that, Singer's home was converted, first, into a boarding house for Westinghouse executives and, later, into individual apartments.

Renovations on the historic building were undertaken by John Bos and Sally Lindsay-Bos during the 1960s and 1970s, and, later, by Steven and Michele Saling.

== See also ==
- National Register of Historic Places listings in Allegheny County, Pennsylvania
