= Leetsdale, Pennsylvania =

Borough in Allegheny county, Pennsylvania

- Borough
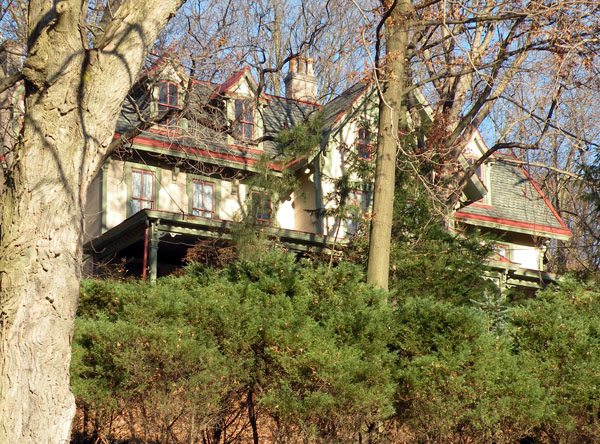
- Elmridge, a historic site in the borough

- Location in Allegheny County and the state of Pennsylvania.
- Coordinates: 40°34′0″N 80°12′41″W
- Country: United States
- State: Pennsylvania
- County: Allegheny
- Incorporated: March 28, 1904

Government
  - Mayor: Sandra Ford (D)

Area
  - Total: 1.20 sq mi (3.10 km^{2})
  - Land: 1.00 sq mi (2.59 km^{2})
  - Water: 0.20 sq mi (0.51 km^{2})

Population (2020)
  - Total: 1,162
  - Density: 1,162.6/sq mi (448.89/km^{2})
- Time zone: UTC-5 (Eastern (EST))
  - Summer (DST): UTC-4 (EDT)
- ZIP code: 15056
- FIPS code: 42-42392
- Website: leetsdaleboro.net

Leetsdale is a borough in Allegheny County, Pennsylvania, United States. Located along the Ohio River, it is part of the Pittsburgh Metro Area. The population was 1,162 at the 2020 census.

== History ==
=== Founding ===
The area that includes present-day Leetsdale was part of The Deprecation Lands, an area lying between the north of the Ohio River and west of the Allegheny River.

Leetsdale was named after Major Daniel Leet, who surveyed the area in 1783 as part of the Depreciation Lands survey. In 1786, the surveyed lands became on sale in Philadelphia. Daniel Leet purchased tracts #3-9, which included the land where Leetsdale is today.

The Act of March 12, 1783 set aside the area as "For the redemption of the Certificates of Depreciation given to the officers and soldiers of the Pennsylvania Line, in pursuance of an Act of December 18, 1780, providing that the certificates should be equal to gold or silver in payment of unlocated lands, if the owners should think proper to purchase such."

On June 10th, 1783, the Surveyor-General ordered that the lands be divided into districts for convenience. Daniel Leet was assigned the Second Depreciation District, which ranged from the northern banks of the Ohio River to southern Lawrence County.

In January of 1785, The Lands were officially purchased from the Six Nations by the Commonwealth of Pennsylvania for the purpose of being given to soldiers in the Revolutionary War in lieu of paper currency, which at the time had sharply depreciated in value (hence the name Depreciation Lands).

By November of 1786, the Lands were auctioned off in Philadelphia. Daniel Leet purchased a portion of the Second Depreciation District that bordered the Ohio River, which he had previously surveyed. Specifically, Leet purchased tracts numbered 3-9. The name given by the original land patented for tract #9 was Leetsburg.

=== Settling ===
In 1792, a well-worn Native American path called the Great Trail, or Beaver Road, (Now Beaver Rd.) that traversed Leet’s land was turned into a military road to supply the Legionville training camp (about 3 miles northwest of Leetsdale today) before their expedition to the Northwest Territory and eventual battle at Fallen Timbers. The road would then be classified as a county road in 1799.

One of the first settlers to the tract of land owned by Daniel Leet was his Brother-in-Law John Bean, who established a small log cabin near the banks of the river in 1796. The small home was washed away at an unknown date. By 1800, a small community of Native Americans living at the mouth of the Little Sewickley Creek moved away, leaving the area largely uninhabited. Also by 1800, Daniel Leet built a small inn on the plot of land, but he himself began to lose interest in the parcel and allowed his brother, William, to tend to it. William then oversaw the construction of a plantation, gristmill, and stone bridge at where the Beaver Road crossed the Little Sewickley Creek.

By 1809, the Beaver Road became a state road and began to see a considerable amount of stagecoach traffic and by 1827, Leetsdale began to officially be planned out and settled. Daniel and William Leet and their families moved to the land in the same year.

=== Growth and industrialization ===
The first major industrial operation in Leetsdale began in 1888 was the Harmony Brickworks, a small foundry owned by the Harmony Society that produced about 20,000 common red bricks a day. The Society sold the brickworks to land developer James B. Oliver in 1902 before the Society dissolved in 1905.

By the turn of the century, Leetsdale became a major industrial hub. Pennsylvania Brick Company and Tate Jones & Co. moved to Leetsdale around this time. Riter-Conley Manufacturing Company opened their 63-acre Leetsdale Works around 1900 which caused a spike in the population. James B. Olivers Land, which was adjacent to the manufacturing plant, was developed into company housing. Although about 900 housing lots stretching from the Pittsburgh, Fort Wayne & Chicago rail line to the banks of the Ohio River spanning 8 streets were intended to be built, only about 60 homes and two streets were built (present day Washington Street and Monroe Way).

The Borough of Leetsdale was incorporated from Leet Township on March 28, 1904. In 1917, the Riter-Conley plant became under the ownership of McClintic-Marshall, which in turn was sold to the multinational Bethlehem Steel Corporation in 1931. Leetsdale's population swelled from 1,904 to 2,774 between 1910 and 1930. During the Second World War, the plant worked in conjunction with both the United States Navy and nearby American Bridge Company plant to produce Landing Ship Tanks (LST’s), the landing watercraft used in Normandy during D-Day. Alongside the LST's, the Leetsdale Works also produced four 30,000 kilowatt floating power plants: Seapower, Inductance, Impedance, and Resistance. After the war, housing for soldiers coming home was built uphill from the plant on Victory Lane.

=== Decline and Modern Developments ===
The Steel Crisis forced the closing of the plant in 1976. Former Mayor of Leetsdale Edward C. Henle described the plant's closure as the worst thing that had ever happened to the town. Since then, Leetsdale has lost 27.6% of its population. The land became a brownfield site until Chapman Properties built the Leetsdale Industrial Park site.

Since then, Leetsdale has made a recovery. The Leetsdale Industrial Park reached full capacity in 2009, housing tenants such as Air Products and Almatis. The former site of the Bethlehem Steel fabrication works was bought by Nextpower, then known as Nextracker, and transformed into a solar tracker manufacturing plant. The Beaver County Times described Leetsdale as “the perfect example of what a former mill site, commonly known as a brownfield, can be.”

== Geography ==
Leetsdale is located at 40°34′0″N 80°12′41″W (40.566667, −80.211274).

According to the United States Census Bureau, the borough has a total area of 1.1 square miles (2.8 km^{2}), of which 1.0 square mile (2.6 km^{2}) is land and 0.2 square miles (0.52 km^{2}), or 13.91%, is water.

== Surrounding communities ==
Leetsdale is bordered by Ambridge in Beaver County to the north, Leet Township to the northeast, and Edgeworth to the southeast. The borough includes the former town of Shields. The Ohio River forms the southwest border of the borough; across the river is Crescent Township.

== Government and politics ==
Presidential election results
Year	Republican	Democratic	Third parties
2020	43% 285	55% 366	1% 9
2016	46% 279	50% 302	4% 28
2012	45% 259	54% 311	1% 4

On November 18, 2021, Democratic mayor Peter Poninsky, who had been mayor of the town for 19 years, lost his reelection bid to fellow Democrat Sandra Ford.

== Demographics ==
Historical population
Census	Pop.	Note	%±
1910	1,904		—
1920	2,311		21.4%
1930	2,774		20.0%
1940	2,332		−15.9%
1950	2,411		3.4%
1960	2,153		−10.7%
1970	1,862		−13.5%
1980	1,604		−13.9%
1990	1,387		−13.5%
2000	1,337		−3.6%
2010	1,218		−8.9%
2020	1,162		−4.6%

As of the 2000 census, there were 1,232 people, 586 households, and 370 families residing in the borough. The population density was 1,246.0 inhabitants per square mile (481.1/km^{2}). There were 653 housing units at an average density of 660.4 per square mile (255.0/km^{2}). The racial makeup of the borough was 89.20% White, 7.31% African American, 0.65% from other races, and 2.84% from two or more races. Hispanic or Latino of any race were 1.62% of the population.

There were 586 households, out of which 23.6% had children under the age of 18 living with them, 41.7% were married couples living together, 14.1% had a female householder with no husband present, and 40.8% were non-families. 38.0% of all households were made up of individuals, and 21.4% had someone living alone who was 65 years of age or older. The average household size was 2.14 and the average family size was 2.80.

In the borough the population was spread out, with 21.3% under the age of 18, 6.2% from 18 to 24, 26.9% from 25 to 44, 22.7% from 45 to 64, and 22.8% who were 65 years of age or older. The median age was 43 years. For every 100 females, there were 80.4 males. For every 100 females age 18 and over, there were 74.6 males.

The median income for a household in the borough was $28,672, and the median income for a family was $37,500. Males had a median income of $31,932 versus $25,750 for females. The per capita income for the borough was $19,172. About 9.6% of families and 12.8% of the population were below the poverty line, including 22.1% of those under age 18 and 10.2% of those age 65 or over.

== See also ==
- List of cities and towns along the Ohio River
