= Powderworks (song) =

Song by Midnight Oil

from the album Midnight Oil
- Released: 1978
- Genre: Rock
- Length: 5:36
- Label: Powderworks; Columbia
- Songwriters: Hirst; James; Moginie; Rotsey
- Producers: Midnight Oil; Keith Walker

"Powderworks" is a song by Midnight Oil released in November 1978 on their eponymous debut album via their own label, Powderworks Records.

== Lyrics ==
The title is an Australian term for a munitions factory. In his autobiography, Moginie says the song was named after "the road we drove down in Narrabeen" on their way to play at The Royal Antler Hotel, one of their early fan bases. Powderworks is also the name of a record label, which the group established in 1978.

== Reception ==
Australian musicologist, Ian McFarlane, described the album, "Only a handful of tracks such as 'Powderworks', 'Used and Abused' and the single 'Run by Night' (December 1978) revealed any promise." "Powderworks" was not released as a single, and despite this is regarded rather highly by fans of the band and early on, became a very important part of the band's live performances. Unlike other songs from the album - "Used and Abused," "Surfing with a Spoon," and "Run by Night" - which were often performed live in the band's early touring, which was a place chosen to road-test the songs from Head Injuries, such as "No Reaction" and "Koala Sprint," this song persevered and was played in live shows up until at least 1982.

== Live versions ==
Currently, only one official live version has been released; this version is available on both Saturday Evening at the Capitol and Scream in Blue. This version omits the third verse and is considerably faster-moving than the original studio version. The song may have appeared on the chocolate wheel for the Redneck Wonderland tour, as did other tracks from this album.

== Compilations ==
While this song was popular with fans, it appeared on neither of the band's two compilations, 20,000 Watt R.S.L. or Flat Chat. It did appear on The Green Disc, however.
