= Bridge in Jefferson Borough =

Cochran's Mill Road over Lick Run Bridge
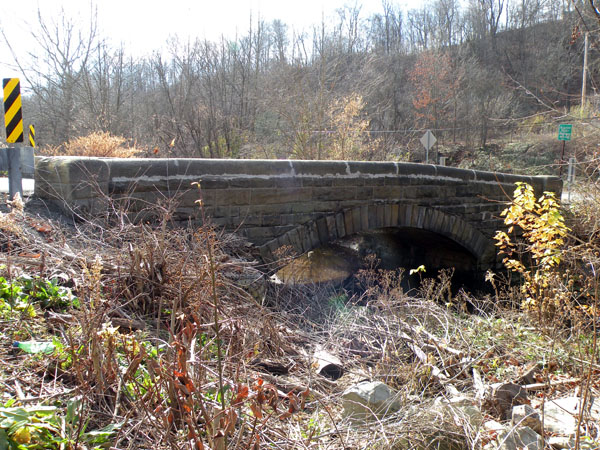
- Coordinates: 40°17′34.48″N 79°58′12.75″W
- Carries: Cochran's Mill Road
- Crosses: Lick Run (Peters Creek)
- Locale: Allegheny County, Pennsylvania
- Heritage status: NRHP

Characteristics
- Design: stone arch bridge
- Material: Sandstone
- Total length: 52 ft (16 m)
- Width: 14.5 ft (4.4 m)

History
- Designer: Charles Davis
- Construction start: 1901

Location
- Interactive map of Cochran's Mill Road over Lick Run Bridge

- Bridge in Jefferson Borough
- U.S. National Register of Historic Places
- Location within Pennsylvania Location within the United States
- Nearest city: Jefferson Hills, Pennsylvania
- Coordinates: 40°17′34.48″N 79°58′12.75″W
- Area: less than one acre
- Built: 1901
- Architectural style: stone arch bridge
- MPS: Highway Bridges Owned by the Commonwealth of Pennsylvania, Department of Transportation TR
- NRHP reference No.: 88000938
- Added to NRHP: June 22, 1988

The Bridge in Jefferson Borough, which carries Cochran's Mill Road over Lick Run, in Allegheny County, Pennsylvania, is a single arch stone bridge built in 1901. It was listed on the National Register of Historic Places in 1988.

Note, it is a different Cochran's Mill, in Armstrong County, which was the birthplace of Nellie Bly (Elizabeth Jane "Pink" Cochran).
