= Hutchinson Farm (Elizabeth, Pennsylvania) =

- U.S. National Register of Historic Places
- U.S. Historic district
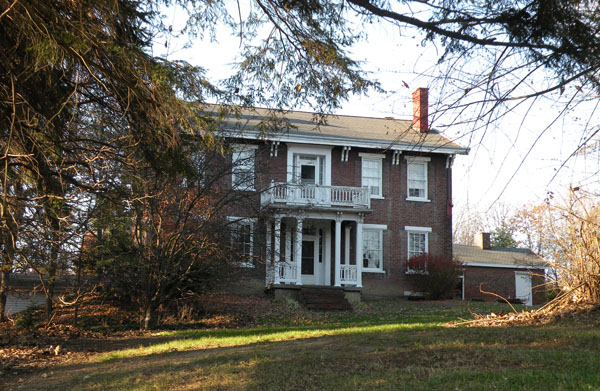

- Location within Pennsylvania Location within the United States
- Location: Round Hill Road at Pennsylvania Route 51 in Elizabeth Township, Allegheny County, Pennsylvania
- Coordinates: 40°14′23.05″N 79°51′53.86″W
- Built: circa 1850 to 1899
- Architectural style: Late Victorian
- NRHP reference No.: 86000321
- Added to NRHP: February 19, 1986

The Hutchinson Farm is an historic farm that is located in Elizabeth Township, Allegheny County, Pennsylvania, United States.

It was listed on the National Register of Historic Places on February 19, 1986.

== History and architectural features ==
This historic farmhouse was built in 1865 and was designed in a vernacular Victorian style. The farm is situated adjacent to the Van Kirk Farm, which is also listed on the National Register.

The Hutchinson Farm was listed on the National Register of Historic Places on February 19, 1986.
