= Sperling Building =

- U.S. National Register of Historic Places
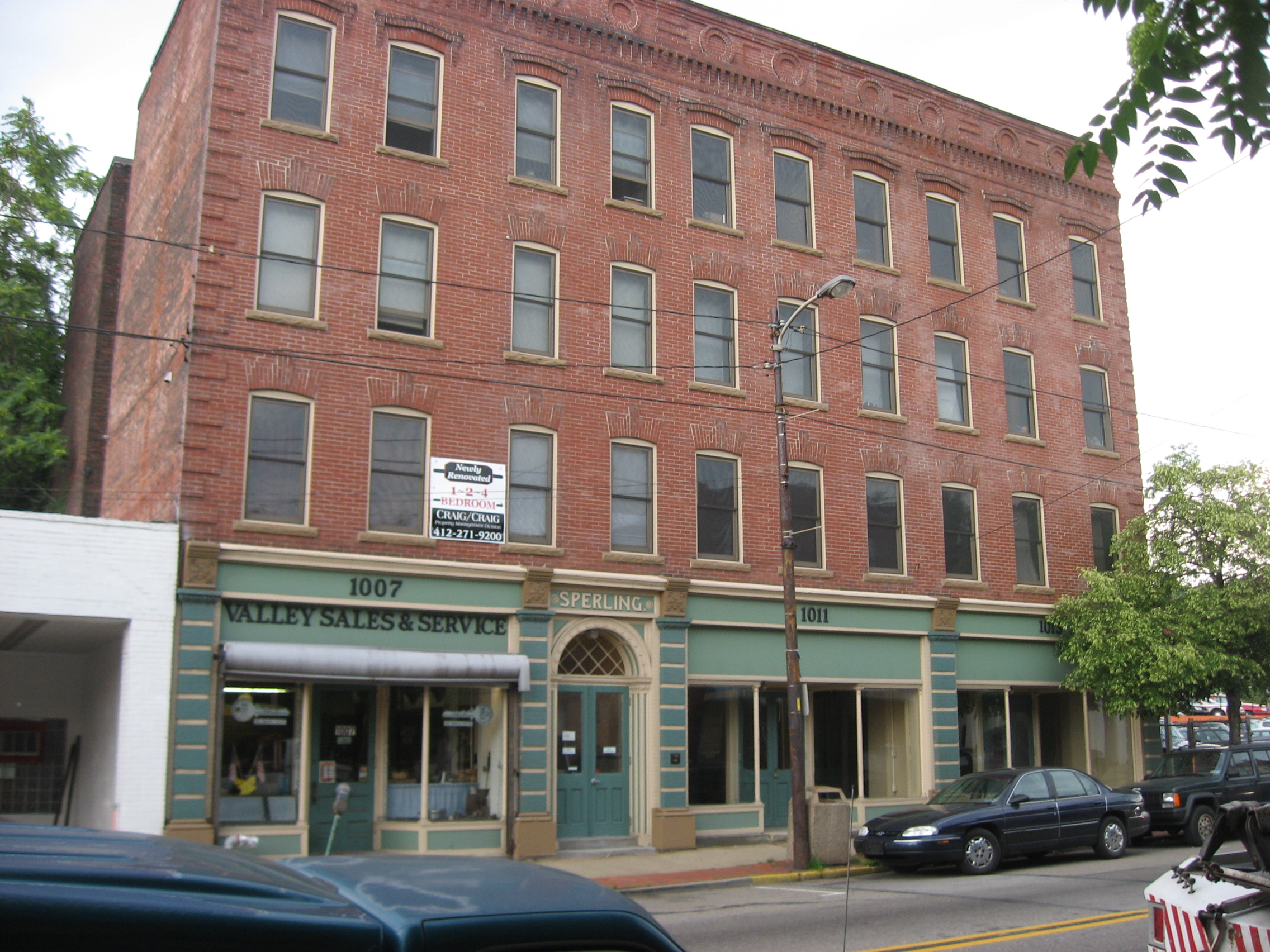

- Location within Pennsylvania Location within the United States
- Location: 1007–1013 Penn Avenue, Wilkinsburg, Pennsylvania, USA
- Coordinates: 40°26′38″N 79°52′45″W
- Built: 1902
- Architectural style: Late Victorian
- NRHP reference No.: 05000410
- Added to NRHP: May 10, 2005

The Sperling Building (also known as the Mercantile Building) located at 1007–1013 Penn Avenue in Wilkinsburg, Pennsylvania, was built for John Sperling in 1902. It was added to the National Register of Historic Places on May 10, 2005.
