= Ohringer Building =

- U.S. National Register of Historic Places
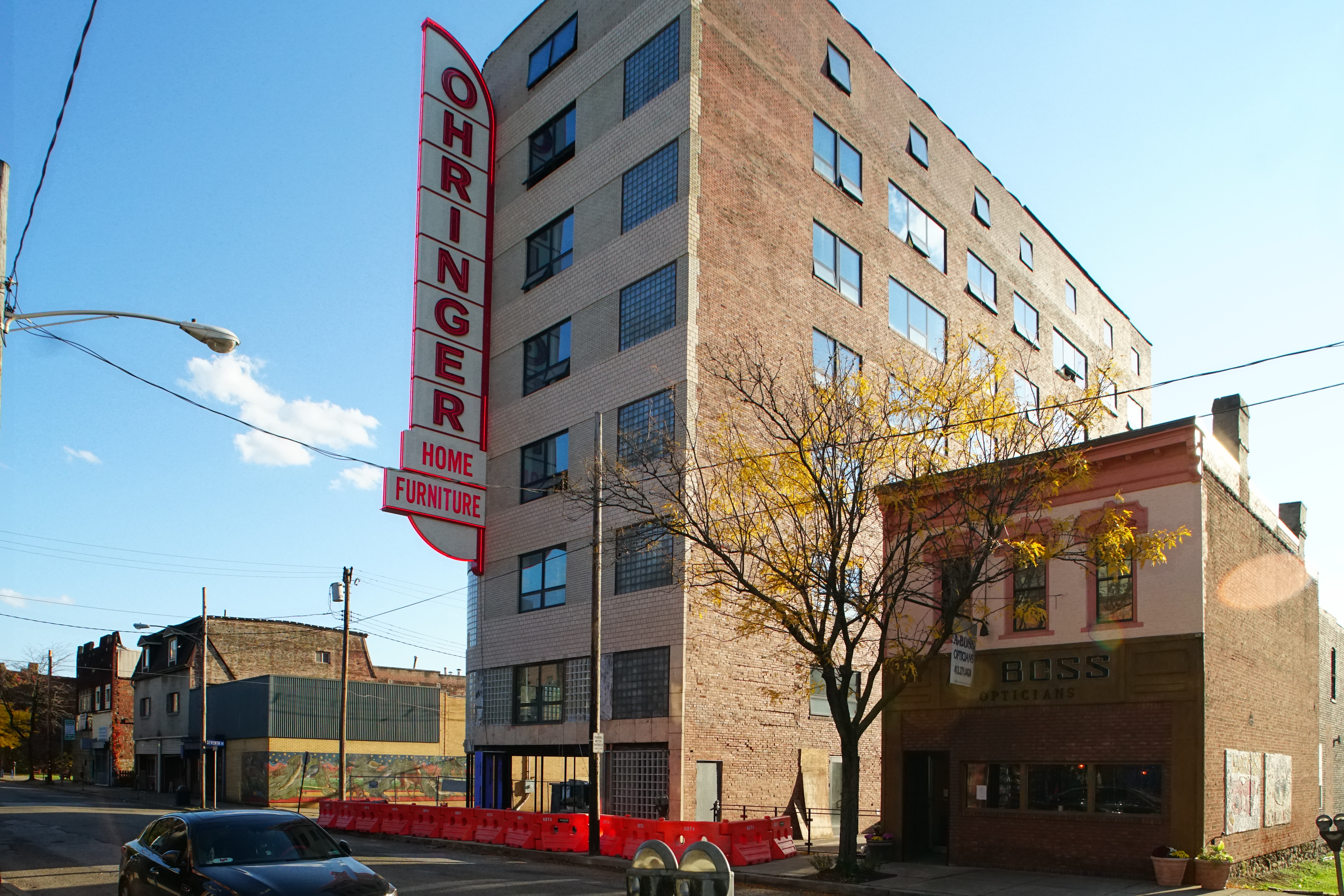

- Location within Pennsylvania Location within the United States
- Location: 640 Braddock Ave., Braddock, Pennsylvania
- Coordinates: 40°24′9″N 79°52′3″W
- Built: 1941
- Architect: Harry H. Lefkowitz
- Architectural style: International Style
- NRHP reference No.: 100005421
- Added to NRHP: August 6, 2020

The Ohringer Building is a historic commercial building in Braddock, Pennsylvania. It was built in 1941 as the Ohringer Home Furniture Co. store, which featured seven stories of showroom space and a curved glass storefront with a large revolving display which was said to be "the largest curved glass window in the country". The furniture store remained in business until 1964, after which the building was used as offices. As of 2020, the building is being renovated and is intended to house low-cost residence and studio space for artists. It was listed on the National Register of Historic Places in 2020.

The building is eight stories high and nearly rectangular in plan, with two bays facing Braddock Avenue and six facing Seventh Street. It was designed by Pittsburgh architect Harry H. Lefkowitz in the International Style, with smooth, plain surfaces and a distinctive curved corner featuring large bands of glass brick on each floor above the main entrance. The street elevations are faced with white terra cotta, with brick infill in some of the window spaces which was added later.
