= Lobb's Cemetery and Yohogania County Courthouse Site =

Historic cemetery in Pennsylvania, US

- U.S. National Register of Historic Places
- Pennsylvania state historical marker
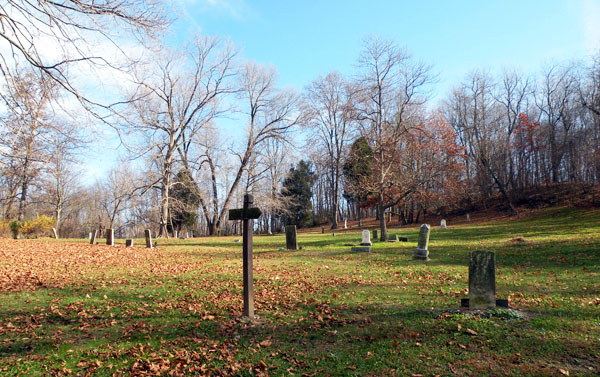

- Location within Pennsylvania Location within the United States
- Nearest city: Jefferson Hills, Pennsylvania
- Coordinates: 40°15′46.41″N 79°54′57.77″W
- Built: 1794
- MPS: Whiskey Rebellion Resources in Southwestern Pennsylvania MPS
- NRHP reference No.: 92001501

Significant dates
- Added to NRHP: November 12, 1992
- Designated PHMC: June 10, 1948

Lobb's Cemetery, a.k.a. Lobb's Run Cemetery, is an historic cemetery that is located in Allegheny County, Pennsylvania. It takes its name from Lobb's Run, a minor tributary of the Monongahela River, which flows by the entrance to the cemetery.

The site was listed on the National Register of Historic Places in 1992.

== History ==
The former Yohogania County Courthouse was once located close to this cemetery. Several of the rebels involved in the Whiskey Rebellion were buried in this cemetery circa 1794.

The site was listed on the National Register of Historic Places in 1992.

== See also ==
- National Register of Historic Places listings in Allegheny County, Pennsylvania
