= Lick Run (Peters Creek tributary) =

Coordinates: 40°16′40″N 79°57′22″W

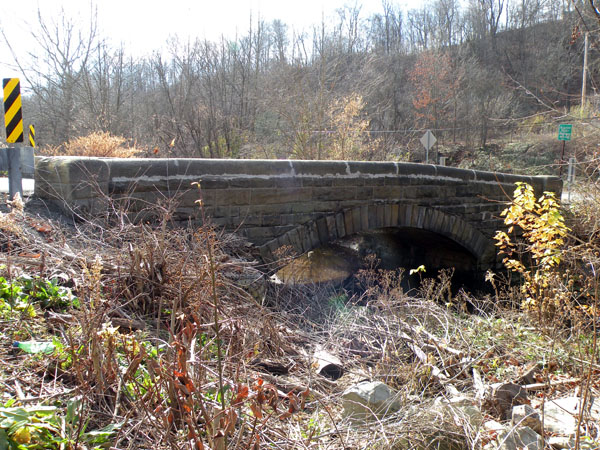
- A stone arch bridge over Lick Run.

Location
- Country: USA
- State: Pennsylvania
- County: Allegheny

Physical characteristics
- Source
  - location: South Park Township, Allegheny County, Pennsylvania
- Mouth
  - location: Peters Creek
  - elevation: 797 ft (243 m)

Lick Run is a 6.7-mile-long (10.8 km) urban stream in southern Allegheny County, Pennsylvania, a tributary of Peters Creek. The former Lick Run coal mine of the Pittsburgh Coal Company had its mouth near the stream, along the B&O Railroad line.

Several stone arch bridges cross the stream. One carries Brownsville Road over the stream near Broughton. A National Landmark stone arch bridge carries Cochran Mill Road over the stream further downstream.

== See also ==
- List of rivers of Pennsylvania
