= Elmridge =

Historic house in Pennsylvania, United States

- U.S. National Register of Historic Places
- Pittsburgh Landmark – PHLF
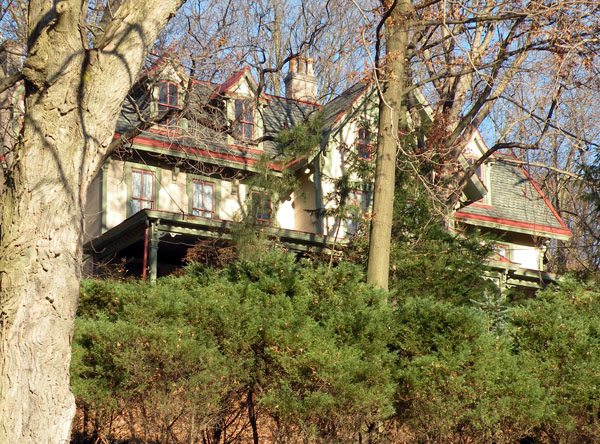

- Location within Pennsylvania Location within the United States
- Location: 1 Breck Drive (at the corner of Beaver Street and Camp Meeting Road), Leetsdale, Pennsylvania, USA
- Coordinates: 40°33′49.49″N 80°12′15.2″W
- Built: 1869; Plan published in Hobbs Architecture, 1873
- Architect: Isaac Hobbs (architect), David Kerr (builder)
- Architectural style: Italianate
- NRHP reference No.: 05000412

Significant dates
- Added to NRHP: May 10, 2005
- Designated PHLF: 2007

Elmridge (also known as Elm Ridge, or James Gardiner Coffin House, or J.G. Coffin House or John Walker House) located at 1 Breck Drive in Leetsdale, Pennsylvania, was built in 1869. The architectural plans were published in Hobbs Architecture, 1873. The house was added to the National Register of Historic Places on May 10, 2005, and to the List of Pittsburgh History and Landmarks Foundation Historic Landmarks in 2007.
