= Logans Ferry Powder Works Historic District =

Historic district in Pennsylvania, United States

- U.S. National Register of Historic Places
- U.S. Historic district
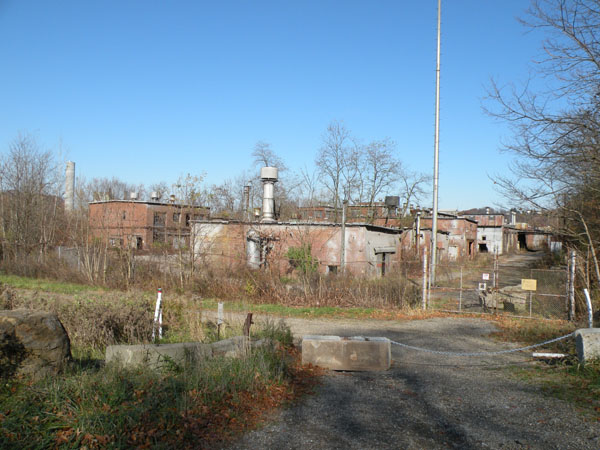

- Location within Pennsylvania Location within the United States
- Location: Barking Road, Plum, Pennsylvania
- Coordinates: 40°32′17.35″N 79°45′55.9″W
- Built: 1918
- NRHP reference No.: 98000399
- Added to NRHP: May 7, 1998

Logans Ferry Powder Works Historic District is a historic district in Plum, Pennsylvania. These powder works were started in 1918, and they produced explosive bronze-aluminum powder for use in fireworks and other explosives and pigments for Alcoa. The works were listed on the National Register of Historic Places on May 7, 1998. the plant was being dismantled as of 3/6/2015
