= Van Kirk Farm =

- U.S. National Register of Historic Places
- U.S. Historic district
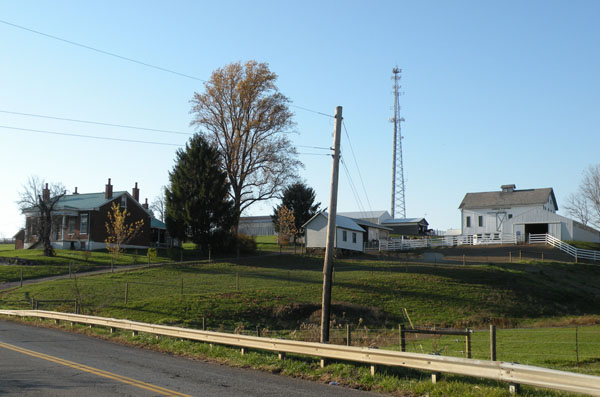

- Location within Pennsylvania Location within the United States
- Location: Round Hill Road at Scenery Drive in Elizabeth Township, Allegheny County, Pennsylvania
- Coordinates: 40°14′27.7″N 79°51′43.09″W
- Built: circa 1820 to 1840
- Architectural style: Greek Revival
- NRHP reference No.: 86000320
- Added to NRHP: February 19, 1986

The Van Kirk Farm is an historic farm that is located in Elizabeth Township, Allegheny County, Pennsylvania, United States.

Listed on the National Register of Historic Places on February 19, 1986, it is adjacent to the Hutchinson Farm, which is also listed on the National Register.

== History and architectural features ==
This fairly simple frame farmhouse was built circa 1840 and was designed in the Greek Revival style. Several other buildings on the farm were built during the mid or late nineteenth century.

It was listed on the National Register of Historic Places on February 19, 1986. The farm is adjacent to the Hutchinson Farm, which is also listed on the National Register.

In "John Chapman, Johnny Appleseed, By occupation a gatherer," according to Mary Grace Hodges (as told to her by her grandmother), Johnny Appleseed (Johnny Chapman) gathered apple seeds from the Van Kirk cider mill.
