= Mooncrest Historic District =

Historic district in Pennsylvania, United States

- U.S. National Register of Historic Places
- U.S. Historic district
- Pennsylvania state historical marker
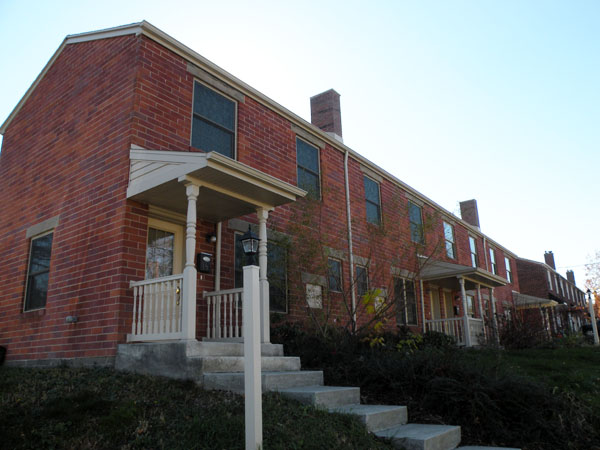
- Newly rebuilt 149-153 Delaware Avenue in the Mooncrest Historic District

- Location within Pennsylvania Location within the United States
- Coordinates: 40°31′26.48″N 80°11′25″W
- Built: 1943
- NRHP reference No.: 13000741

Significant dates
- Added to NRHP: September 18, 2013
- Designated PHMC: April 15, 2004

Mooncrest Historic District is a historic district in Moon Township, Pennsylvania, USA. This community was built during World War II as housing for defense workers. Mooncrest residents produced armor plate, munitions, and ships at the nearby Dravo Corporation on Neville Island. The district was listed on the National Register of Historic Places on September 18, 2013.
