= The Devil's Company =

Historical mystery novel

- First edition cover
- Author: David Liss
- Language: English
- Genre: Historical-Mystery
- Published: 2009 (Random House)
- Publication place: United States
- Media type: Print (hardcover)
- Pages: 369
- ISBN: 978-1-4000-6419-9
- OCLC: 67346332
- Preceded by: A Spectacle of Corruption

The Devil's Company is a historical-mystery-thriller novel by David Liss, set in 18th century London. It is the third of three novels containing the memoir of the fictional Benjamin Weaver, a retired bare-knuckle boxer, now a "thief-taker" (a cross between a modern private investigator and bounty hunter). Weaver's "memoir" began with Liss' first novel, A Conspiracy of Paper (2000), and continued in A Spectacle of Corruption (2004).

== Synopsis ==
=== Plot ===
This third memoir installment begins in November of 1722, eight months after the 1722 General Election that provided the historical setting for A Spectacle of Corruption. This time, Weaver finds himself involved in puzzling and dangerous events surrounding the all-powerful East India Company.

Victimized, along with family and friends, by an elaborate extortion scheme, Weaver is forced to spy and steal for the enigmatic Jerome Cobb. Under Cobb's direction, Weaver infiltrates the Company and attempts to learn its secrets before the upcoming meeting of the board of directors (called the Court of Proprietors). Trouble is, Cobb won't (or can't) say exactly what he's looking for, or why. As is typical in this genre, the truth is not revealed until the final pages.

Along the way, Weaver meets a colorful assortment of characters, including a betel-nut chewing Company director, an obsessive-compulsive clerk, a bi-sexual bigamist inventor, the London silk-weavers' guild master and several varieties of international spy. The agents of France - Britain's arch-enemy throughout the 18th Century - are deeply involved. And it turns out that India's Mughal Emperor, on whose domains the East India Company is steadily encroaching, also has his own Man in London.

=== Characters ===
Fictional protagonist and memoirist Benjamin Weaver is the London-born son of Portuguese Jewish immigrants. Liss has written that the character was "inspired" by the real life boxing champion, Daniel Mendoza, who also wrote a memoir.

Besides Weaver, fictional characters carried over from A Spectacle of Corruption, include the Scottish surgeon Elias Gordon, who plays Dr. Watson to Weaver's Sherlock Holmes. Uncle Miguel Lienzo is again an important character, and Cousin Miriam, a former love interest, appears briefly. One historical character, the notorious 'Thief-taker General' Jonathan Wild, also makes a return appearance.

Weaver's romantic interest this time is the seductive Celia Glade who turns out to be, of course, not what she seems. But whoever she really is, she - herself deeply involved in various mysterious affairs - is clearly a more fitting mate than Miriam, who firmly rejected the idea of being married to a thief-taker and sought a socially- prestigious match.

Concerning his approach to creation of fictional characters for the historical-mystery-thriller genre, Liss says, "What readers care about is that the characters want something and they have to do difficult or dangerous things in order to accomplish their goals".

=== Setting ===
As in the first two Benjamin Weaver novels, the action takes place entirely in or near 1722 London. Weaver's unusual profession brings him into contact with a wide cross-section of Georgian era society, from wealthy and powerful East India Company directors to poverty-stricken street urchins.

As a former PhD candidate in 18th century British literature, Liss takes period research and detail seriously. As he said in an interview, "If things had not worked out with fiction, I probably would have kept to my graduate school career track and sought a job as a literature professor".

Liss noted his surprise at discovering how many questionable business practices of present-day Wall Street were already present in early 18th Century London. The shady intrigues and sometimes literally cutthroat competition between the directors of the East India Company form an important part of the plot.

=== Style ===
As fiction purporting to be a memoir, the novel is written as a first-person narrative. The language attempts to impart a period feel without sacrificing readability. A reviewer who is also an English professor wrote that "his efforts at writing period dialogue are, at best, stiff and sometimes unintentionally laughable". The review continues with "is this post-modern pastiche or is Liss just tone deaf? One hopes, very much against hope, that Liss' tongue is having a rendezvous with his cheek".

== Major themes ==
One reviewer notes that, as a Jew, the Weaver character "permits Liss to show us how anti-Semitism was expressed in the relatively unfamiliar context of Hanoverian England". Weaver finds, however, that Jews were not the only minority to face bigotry and hatred in the London depicted in The Devil's Company . Homosexuals, immigrants, the poor and a dark-skinned native of India all receive their share of abuse. The un-liberated status of women in that era also plays a role in the story.

The same reviewer mentions another major theme; the novel "explores the beginnings of corporate culture and globalization. Liss cleverly refers to the works of Charles Davenant and Josiah Child and their theory of free trade". The clash between "free trade" and protection of native industry is portrayed throughout the story.

According to Liss, "At their core, my novels are about the dangerous and despicable things people will often do to obtain or keep money."

=== Explanation of the novel's title ===
One of the fictional characters, not happy about the activities of the British East India Company, refers to it as "the devil's company".
