= The Coffee Trader =

2003 novel by David Liss

- First edition cover
- Author: David Liss
- Cover artist: View Down a Corridor, by Hoogstraten
- Language: English
- Genre: Historical novel
- Published: 2003 (Random House)
- Publication place: United States
- Media type: Print (hardcover)
- Pages: 394
- ISBN: 978-0-8129-7032-6
- OCLC: 49531074

The Coffee Trader is a historical novel by David Liss, set in 17th-century Amsterdam. The story revolves around the activities of commodity trader Miguel Lienzo, who is a Jewish refugee from the Portuguese Inquisition. Recovering from near financial ruin, he embarks on a coffee trading scheme with a Dutch woman, kept secret because it is forbidden by his community council. Miguel navigates the social structures of the Amsterdam business world, the politics of the council, and the plots of competitors bringing this new import to Europe.

The character of Miguel Lienzo is the great-uncle of Benjamin Weaver, the protagonist of Liss's first novel, A Conspiracy of Paper. This novel is set about 60 years earlier, but is not a prequel; as stated by Liss, Miguel Lienzo is a very different kind of character from the English great-nephew whom he would never meet.

The book has been published in translation into Chinese, Danish, French, German, Hebrew, Hungarian, Italian, Japanese, Korean, Polish, Russian, Spanish, Portuguese and Turkish.

== Plot summary ==
The year is 1659. Miguel Lienzo is in financial trouble as a result of some trades in sugar that have gone poorly. He is being pursued by his creditors and is looking for a way out of his current problems. His friend Geertruid persuades him to invest in coffee, a little-known commodity in Europe. After trying coffee for himself at a Turkish coffee house, he is convinced that there could be a market for the beverage in Europe. He devises a scheme to manipulate the price of coffee by buying up as much as possible on several exchanges around Europe simultaneously. Miguel gets Geertruid to front the money for the initial purchases, and he arranges for most of the foreign trades, ordering 90 barrels of coffee through an Amsterdam broker named Isaiah Nunes.

Meanwhile, Miguel is living with his younger brother Daniel and his young wife, Hannah, who is pregnant. Miguel owes money to Daniel as well as to other creditors, but his coffee scheme will take months to pay off, and he is on the verge of losing more money on some bad investments in a brandy futures contract. His long-time enemy Solomon Parido approaches him with overtures of friendship and an offer to connect Miguel with a buyer for the brandy futures. Though skeptical, Miguel goes through with the trade, only to see the price of brandy rise just before close of trading. While the trade mitigated Miguel's potential losses, it cost him money he might have earned if he had retained them. On the advice of Alonzo Alferonda, Miguel is able to earn a significant profit on whale oil futures, which costs Parido considerably and enables Miguel to pay off many of his debts and regain some standing in the community.

Several intrigues follow. Miguel finds a mutual attraction with his sister-in-law Hannah. Parido catches wind of Miguel's interest in coffee, and appears to have coffee interests of his own. Parido uses his influence with the Jewish ruling council, the Ma'amad, to censure Miguel. Miguel receives threats from creditors still waiting to be paid, even as he is himself waiting to be paid for his profits in the whale oil trade. He begins to have suspicions about Geertruid's trustworthiness and takes some of her coffee-investment money to pay some of his creditors. Miguel and Daniel's relationship is strained by many of these events.

When Nunes's coffee shipment arrives in Amsterdam, it appears that Nunes has promised it to both Parido and Miguel Lienzo. Parido and Lienzo place a wager on the final price of coffee for the day, and both attempt to manipulate the price in their favor. Miguel wins the wager and a considerable sum, but betrays Geertruid in the process, believing Geertruid to having been Parido's spy. He repays her initial investment, but cuts her out of the profits she was expecting.

Hannah deceives Daniel by informing him that their baby is actually Miguel's and, along with his bankruptcy, Daniel informs her that he is leaving the city and will grant her a divorce. She goes to Miguel's house and they plan to marry. Miguel learns that Geertruid was working for Alferonda, not Parido; he tries too late to make amends. Geertruid leaves the city with her companion, Hendrick, but not before Hendrick beats Miguel's sometime-friend Joachim in retribution for Miguel's betrayal. Miguel and Hannah have a son, Samuel, and later another boy. His prosperous future now lies securely in the coffee trade.

== Characters ==
=== Lienzo household ===
- Miguel Lienzo - a Portuguese Jewish merchant living in Amsterdam. Miguel is the main viewpoint character of the novel.
- Daniel Lienzo - Miguel's younger brother; Miguel is indebted to Daniel and is living in Daniel's basement.
- Hannah - Daniel's wife, who is pregnant. Raised Catholic, and unaware of her Jewish heritage until her wedding day. She is an occasional viewpoint character in the novel.
- Annetje - Daniel and Hannah's maid, and Miguel's occasional lover; she is Catholic.

=== Jewish characters ===
- Solomon Parido - an influential Jewish merchant; a parnass on the Jewish Ma'amad, the local council that controls the affairs of Sephardic Jews in Amsterdam. Miguel had previously been engaged to Parido's daughter, but he earned Parido's enmity when he was caught in flagrante delicto with Parido's maid.
- Alonzo Alferonda "The Userer" - a moneylender, and Parido's enemy. Parido was angered by Alferonda's acting against his combination in a salt trade and managed to have him excommunicated from the Jewish community for helping shunned and poorer "Tudesco" Jews. He is a viewpoint character in the novel, as related through passages framed as excerpts from his memoirs.
- Isaiah Nunes - a friend of Miguel's and a broker on the Amsterdam Exchange.
- Ricardo - a broker on the exchange.

=== Dutch characters ===
- Geertruid Damhuis - a widow who does business on the Exchange; a friend of Miguel.
- Hendrick - Geertruid's companion and bodyguard.
- Joachim Waagenaar - a Dutch businessmen who lost his fortune in a deal in which Miguel also lost money; he blames Miguel for the loss.

== Critical reception ==
The Coffee Trader was published in 2003 to generally positive reviews. Several reviewers noted the novel's depth of historical detail, including mention of the three pages of bibliography at the end of the book. Others mention the intricacy of the plot; writing for The New York Times, Thomas Mallon described "the book's commercial plot to be as complicated as it is expert", requiring occasional narrative recaps to help the reader keep track of its intricacies. Despite the "careful attention" to setting, Mallon wished for a bit more "time and place" as a break from the rapid and intricate plot.

Writing in the Jewish Quarterly Review, Adam Sutcliffe identified The Coffee Trader as among "the underinvestigated emerging genre of the 'port Jew novel,'" citing as other examples In an Antique Land by Amitav Ghosh, The Nature of Blood by Caryl Phillips, and The Moor’s Last Sigh by Salman Rushdie.

== Historical accuracy ==
The novel shows considerable attention to historical detail. In the "historical note" appended to the novel, the author notes that many modern business methods, especially those having to do with the stock market, came into being in 17th-century Holland. New York Times reviewer Thomas Mallon writes that the Amsterdam of the novel is "a kind of information age, where wealth follows from what one knows or can trick others into believing." Historian Adam Sutcliffe also sees the seeds of modernity in the novel's portrayal of Amsterdam "as a crucible of modernity is based above all in the easy contact between Jews and non-Jews," but finds that Liss goes too far in this portrayal, saying that "there appears to be almost no cultural distance between... an intensely Calvinist [Dutch] society... [and] the Sephardim... steeped in their very different Iberian sensibility." Sutcliffe concludes, "The commercial, cultural, and political modernity of this Amsterdam milieu underpins the familiar fascination of The Coffee Trader. The less recognizably modern aspects of Sephardic life are marginal to Liss's narrative, but they Liss has said that the novel was originally focused on the chocolate trade, but he switched the focal commodity because "coffee was a better fit" and that "coffee and business go so naturally together." In an interview, Liss was asked whether Miguel was based on a particular historical figure; he replied that Miguel "is entirely made up based on the sort of character I wanted to see in that situation."
