= Presley Neville =

American military officer (1755–1818)

Presley Neville (1755–1818) was an American military officer, and state official who served in the American Revolutionary War.

Presley Neville was born at the family home in Winchester, Virginia, to General John Neville and Winifred Oldham Neville. He was educated at the University of Pennsylvania. Neville served as the Marquis de Lafayette's aide-de-camp for two years. Both Presley and his father, John, were captured in the Siege of Charleston in 1780. Following his release in 1782, Presley married Nancy Morgan, daughter of General Daniel Morgan. They lived at Woodville near Pittsburgh, Pennsylvania, where they were caught up in the Whiskey Rebellion, and raised a family.

In 1800, Neville ran for Congress as a Federalist in the 12th congressional district, but lost to incumbent Albert Gallatin. He then served as Chief Burgess of Borough of Pittsburgh (pre-city charter equivalent of mayor) from 1804 to 1805.

He is the namesake of the village of Neville, Ohio.
