= A Spectacle of Corruption =

Historical mystery novel

- First edition cover
- Author: David Liss
- Cover artist: William Hogarth, A Scene from ‘The Beggar’s Opera’ VI - 1731
- Language: English
- Genre: Historical-Mystery
- Published: 2004 (Random House)
- Publication place: United States
- Media type: Print (hardcover)
- Pages: 381 pp
- ISBN: 0-375-50855-4
- OCLC: 52410528
- Dewey Decimal: 813.6-dc21
- LC Class: PS3562.17814S64 2004
- Preceded by: A Conspiracy of Paper
- Followed by: The Devil's Company

A Spectacle of Corruption is a historical-mystery novel by David Liss, set in 18th century London. It is the middle of three novels containing the memoir of the fictional Benjamin Weaver, a Jewish former bare-knuckle boxer and current "thief-taker" (private investigator).

== Synopsis ==
This tale picks up a few months after the conclusion of David Liss' first novel, A Conspiracy of Paper. It's late in the year 1721 and Benjamin Weaver is hired by a clergyman to investigate a death threat against him. His quest doesn't go according to plan, however, and Weaver soon finds himself falsely accused of murder, sentenced to hang and confined in the infamous Newgate Prison. He must somehow escape this fate, clear his name, and find those responsible.

The safest course, once having escaped from prison, would be to escape England altogether - but Weaver would not hear of it. He is determined to pursue his investigations in a London where he is a hunted man, with the very substantial reward of 150 Pounds offered to anyone who would help send him back to the gallows.

Weaver's personal and occupational struggles play out against the backdrop of the upcoming general election, in which the contending Whig and Tory parties seem equally corrupt.

Several of the other fictional characters are carry-overs from A Conspiracy of Paper. As in the first installment of his "memoir", Weaver is aided by his uncle Miguel and his best friend, the surgeon Elias Gordon. His cousin's widow Miriam, now married to a Tory candidate for Parliament, once again tugs on Weaver's heart strings.

== Historical References ==
At the front of the book, Liss provides a "Time Line of Significant Events Leading Up to the 1722 General Election". He states that "This first general election since George became king takes place and is widely viewed as a referendum on his kingship." The previously apolitical Weaver must take a crash course in London politics, as he attempts to understand the actions and motivations of various Whigs, Tories, Jacobites and even the Chevalier himself. Among the less distinguished figures, the infamous Jonathan Wild again appears as Weaver's principal business rival.

Weaver's adventures take him all over London to many historical landmarks, streets and districts. Liss also works into the story some curious and distinctive features of London life in the 1720s, such as the Window tax, the Septennial Act and current styles in perukes.
