= Leland Baldwin =

American author and historian (1897–1981)

Leland DeWitt Baldwin
- Born: Leland DeWitt Baldwin; November 23, 1897; Fairchance, Pennsylvania, US
- Died: March 6, 1981 (aged 83); Santa Barbara, California, US
- Education: Greenville College (BA); University of Michigan (MA, PhD)
- Occupations: professor; Author; Historian
- Writing career
- Language: English
- Genres: History, non-fiction, historical fiction
- Notable awards: Legion of Merit

Leland DeWitt Baldwin (November 23, 1897 – March 6, 1981) was a professor, historian, and writer. He directed the Western Pennsylvania Historical Survey and served as a professor of American history at the University of Pittsburgh. He authored many works, including The Delectable Country (1939), The Stream of American History (1952), and The American Quest for the City of God (1981).

== Early life and education ==
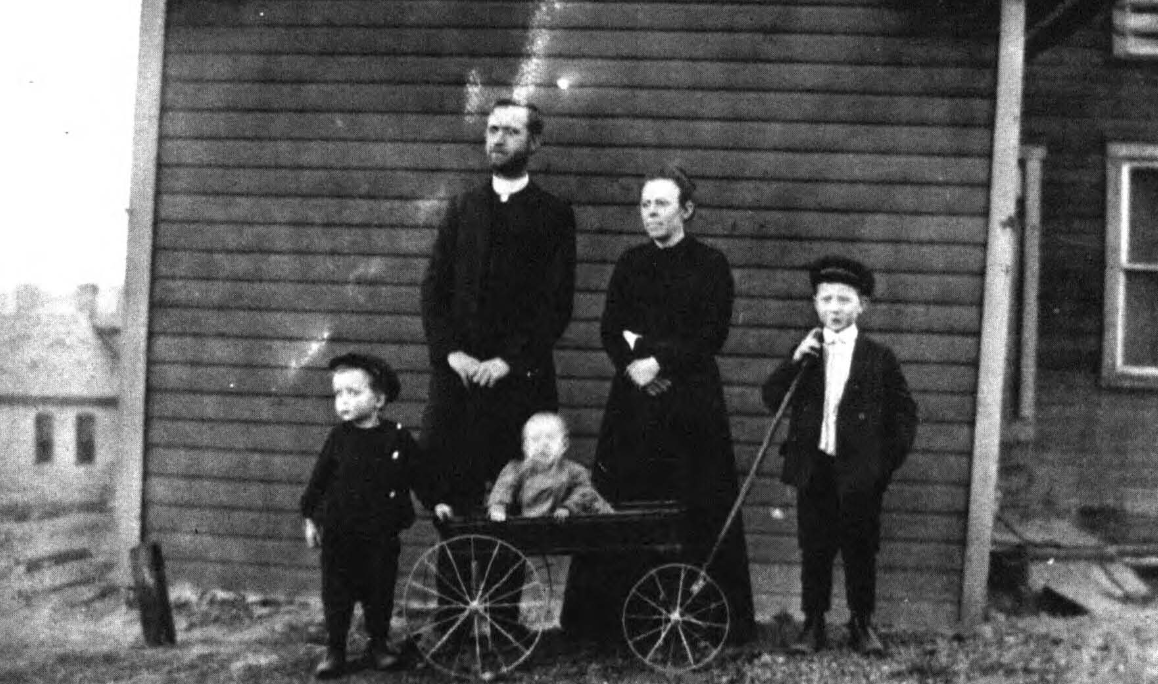
Leland Baldwin (far right) with his family, age 7 or 8.

Baldwin was born in Fairchance, Pennsylvania on November 23, 1897, to Reverend Harmon Allen Baldwin and Etta Weatherly Baldwin. His father was a renowned figure in the Free Methodist Church within the Ohio Valley and was once considered a candidate for the Prohibition Party vice-presidential nomination. He had two siblings; a younger brother, Harmon Wayland Baldwin, and a younger sister, Evelyn Clara Baldwin.

From 1917 to 1920 Baldwin worked in a variety of factories. He also worked in a hammer shop as a book keeper, where he solved a reoccurring issue of hammer shop helpers striking. From 1920 to 1922 he worked as a paper hanger.

Baldwin attended Greenville College beginning in 1915, where he showed himself to be a reliably high-achieving student. While at Greenville he played basketball and performed karaoke, including "Bedouin Love Song" and "In the Garden of my Heart." He also was known for pulling pranks. Baldwin graduated from Greenville in 1921 with a Bachelor of Arts. He began attending the University of Michigan during the Summers in 1922, seeking a Master of Arts. He wrote his dissertation on "Old Steamboat Days on the Lower Mississippi" under Ulrich Phillips, then became Dwight Dumond's first graduate student. He received his MA in 1923, and continued his studies at the University of Michigan, pursuing a PhD in history, which he received in 1932.

== Academic career ==
Baldwin taught at Miltonvale College during the academic year from 1922 to 1924. There he taught American and modern history, as well as English literature. In his second year he coached their athletic teams. From 1924 to 1926 he taught at Har-brack High School in Pennsylvania, and from 1926 to 1931 he taught at Crafton High School also in Pennsylvania. In 1932 he returned to Ann Arbor to focus on completing his PhD.

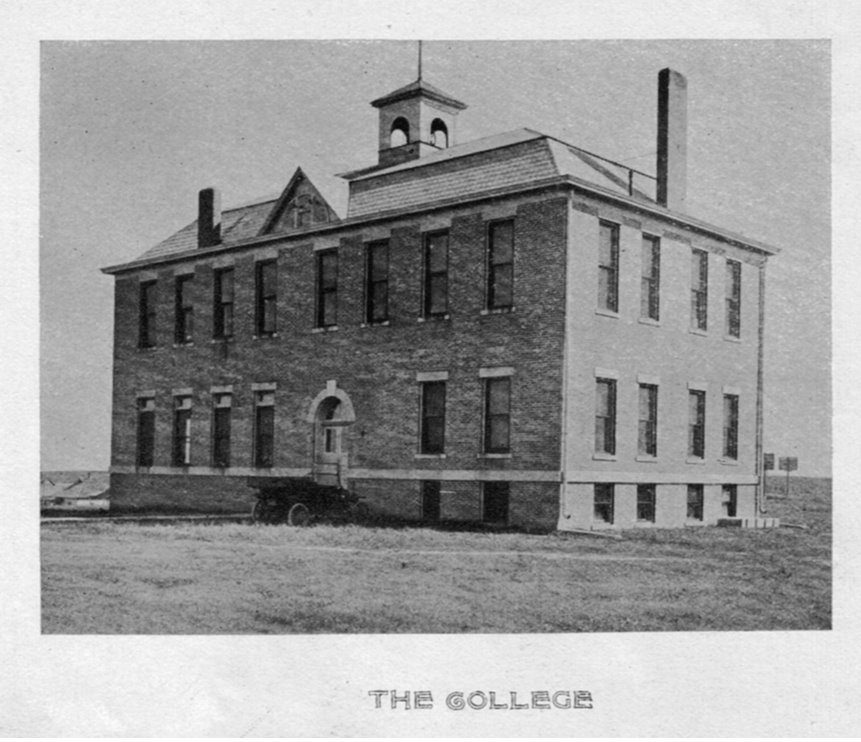
Miltonvale College, 1915

After completing his doctorate Baldwin became a research assistant and librarian for the Western Pennsylvania Historical Survey under the Historical Society of Western Pennsylvania. He also served as a director of the survey from 1935 to 1936. Baldwin simultaneously lectured at the University of Pittsburgh and served as the first editor at the University of Pittsburgh Press.

In 1940 he became the acting librarian of the University of Pittsburgh. While librarian, he attempted to streamline the library and procure greater funding. He left his position to enlist in the military.

In 1946, after leaving military service, Baldwin became an associate professor in the history department of the University of Pittsburgh, and became professor in 1955. He taught primarily courses in American history and the expansion of Western civilization. He retired the University in 1961, having never actually taught a course at the university in 15 years. He had been a Fulbright Lecturer at the University of Leeds (1952–1953), a State Department Lecturer in Pakistan, India, and Sri Lanka (1953–54), and a visiting professor at the University of California Los Angeles (1955). He then worked as a professor at the University of California Santa Barbara (1961–1962, 1964–1965), and The University of Natal (1963–1964) before retiring from professorship.

== Military service ==
Baldwin enlisted with a Captain's commission in the United States Air Force on May 13, 1942. On December 17, 1943, he reached the rank of Major, and on February 27, 1945, he reached the rank of Lieutenant colonel. As a historical editor he did not participate in combat, but he was present in the European Theater, including Tunisia and the Allied Invasion of Italy. He received the EAME Ribbon, the Legion of Merit, and five Overseas Service Bars. He served in the Tenth Air Force's intelligence division.

While deployed he met Elliott Roosevelt, Thornton Wilder, Lauris Norstad, John Higham, and Bernard Berenson. Baldwin continued to maintain steady correspondence with Berenson for years after the war. He also penned an unpublished 280-page memoir on the war titled Staff Captains Never Die. Among other details, Staff Captains Never Die describes the logistics of Operation Strangle and Baldwin's knowledge of the atomic bomb long before its use. He retired from active duty on January 5, 1946.

== Writing career ==
=== History ===
In 1937 Baldwin released his first book, Pittsburgh: The Story of a City, as a part of the Western Pennsylvania Historical Survey. It described in-depth the history of Pittsburgh, with a focus on Pittsburgh's history prior to the American Civil War. The book covers the full history of Pittsburgh and its land, speaking of the many "growing pains" the city faced.

Baldwin wrote and published his second book, Whiskey Rebels: The Story of a Frontier Uprising, in 1939. The book tells the story of the Whiskey rebellion. The University of Pittsburgh alumni review stated "This book is written to be read. It's history told the way it should be told, if it’s to be interesting to a larger group than the professional historians."

In 1941, Baldwin published The Keelboat Age on Western Waters. It was the last of ten books published with the Western Pennsylvania Historical Survey. It focuses on boating in the West prior to the steamboat.

Baldwin published The Story of the Americas in 1943. Designed for popular consumption, rather than for historians, the book used "unorthodox vocabulary" and "some events" were "obviously selected for their interest rather than their significance."

In 1944 Baldwin, inspired by his time in Europe throughout the war, wrote God's Englishman: The Evolution of Anglo-Saxon Spirit. Baldwin posits that the success of the British Empire is due to The English Conscience, which developed as result of a variety of factors, including English isolation, philosophy, and The Common Law.

Baldwin's 1948 work Best Hope of Earth: A Grammar of Democracy traces the routes of democracy to Ancient Greece and Rome. Baldwin attempted to examine the role of democracy in the contemporary world, and concluded that "democracy is a positive political process for working toward liberty, equality, and fraternity... though it bears in itself the means of improvement, it can never lay claim to perfection without destroying its essential nature."

In 1952 Baldwin published The Stream of American History, an American history textbook. At its peak, the book was used in at least 92 universities and colleges. He published a second edition in 1957, a third edition in 1965, and a fourth in 1969.

In 1954 Baldwin published a book designed as a "more detailed treatment of twentieth century events", Recent American History. A year later, in 1955, Baldwin published The Meaning of America: Essays Towards an Understanding of the American Spirit. Designed as a companion to The Stream of American History, it examined the American economic and political systems, providing a strength/weakness analysis in connection with the history of the United States.

In 1971 Baldwin published Reframing the Constitution: An Imperative for Modern America, in which he argued for a complete re-writing of the United States Constitution. His suggestions included making Congress unicameral and re-dividing the nation into 14 distinct states: Alleghenia, Appalachia, California, Chicago, Detroit, Erie, Mississippi, Missouri, New England, New York, Oregon, Savanna, Sierra, and Texas.

In 1973 Baldwin collaborated with professor Robert Kelley from the University of California Santa Barbara to produce The American Quest.

In 1981 The American Quest for the City of God was released shortly after Baldwin's death. In it, he expressed disillusionment with the American invasion of Vietnam.'

=== Historical novels ===
In 1939 Baldwin published his sole novel, The Delectable Country. It was set in the trans-Appalachian West during the 1790s, and focused on many elements of Western Pennsylvanian History including the Whiskey Rebellion. It briefly reached several best-seller lists. James Branch Cabell described it as "as good as Gone with the Wind."

In the 1970s he planned a five-book novel series known as the Penburne Quintet, which would have featured The Delectable Country as its third entry. The other intended entries included The Fourteenth Fire, The Drums Draw Near, Greenbay or the Rivers, and A Gentleman of No Consequence. He successfully published only The Delectable Country.

== Written works ==
- — (1937). Pittsburgh: The Story of a City, 1750-1865. Pittsburgh: University of Pittsburgh Press. ISBN 9780822952169.
- — (1939). The Delectable Country. New York: Lee Furman, Inc.
- — (1939). Whiskey Rebels: The Story of a Frontier Uprising. Pittsburgh: University of Pittsburgh Press. ISBN 9780822951513.
- — (1941). The Keelboat Age on Western Waters. Pittsburgh: University of Pittsburgh Press. ISBN 9780822953197.
- — (1943). The Story of the Americas: the Discovery, Settlement, and Development of the New World. New York: Simon and Schuster.
- — (1944). God's Englishman: The Evolution of the Anglo-Saxon Spirit. Boston: Little, Brown, and Company.
- — (1948). Best Hope of Earth: A Grammar of Democracy. Pittsburgh: University of Pittsburgh Press.
- — (1952). The Stream of American History. New York: Simon and Schuster.
- — (1954). Recent American History. New York: American Book Company.
- — (1955). The Meaning of America: Essays Towards an Understanding of the American Spirit. Pittsburgh: University of Pittsburgh Press. ISBN 9781258266233.
- — (1971). Reframing the Constitution: An Imperative for Modern America. Santa Barbara: ABC Clio. ISBN 9780874360837.
- — (1973). The American Quest. Belmont: Wadsworth Publishing Company.
- — (1981). The American Quest for the City of God. Macon: Mercer University Press. ISBN 9780865540163.
