= Wilderness Boy =

1955 novel

- First edition
- Author: Margery Evernden
- Language: English
- Publisher: Putnam
- Publication date: 1955
- Publication place: United States
- Media type: Print (Hardback)
- Pages: 218 pp
- OCLC: 5956478

Wilderness Boy is an historical, young adult novel by American writer Margery Evernden.

Set in 1794 in Washington County, Pennsylvania, just south of Pittsburgh, it tells the story of sixteen-year-old Jonathon Garrett, who while on an errand for his frontier doctor uncle, is accosted by local farmers and enlisted to join them in raising a Liberty Pole. The events of the Whiskey Rebellion soon unfold.

== See also ==
Other novels that employ events of the Whiskey Rebellion:

- The Latimers (1898)
- The Delectable Country (1939)
- The Whiskey Rebels (2008)
