= John Neville (general) =

American general (1731-1803)

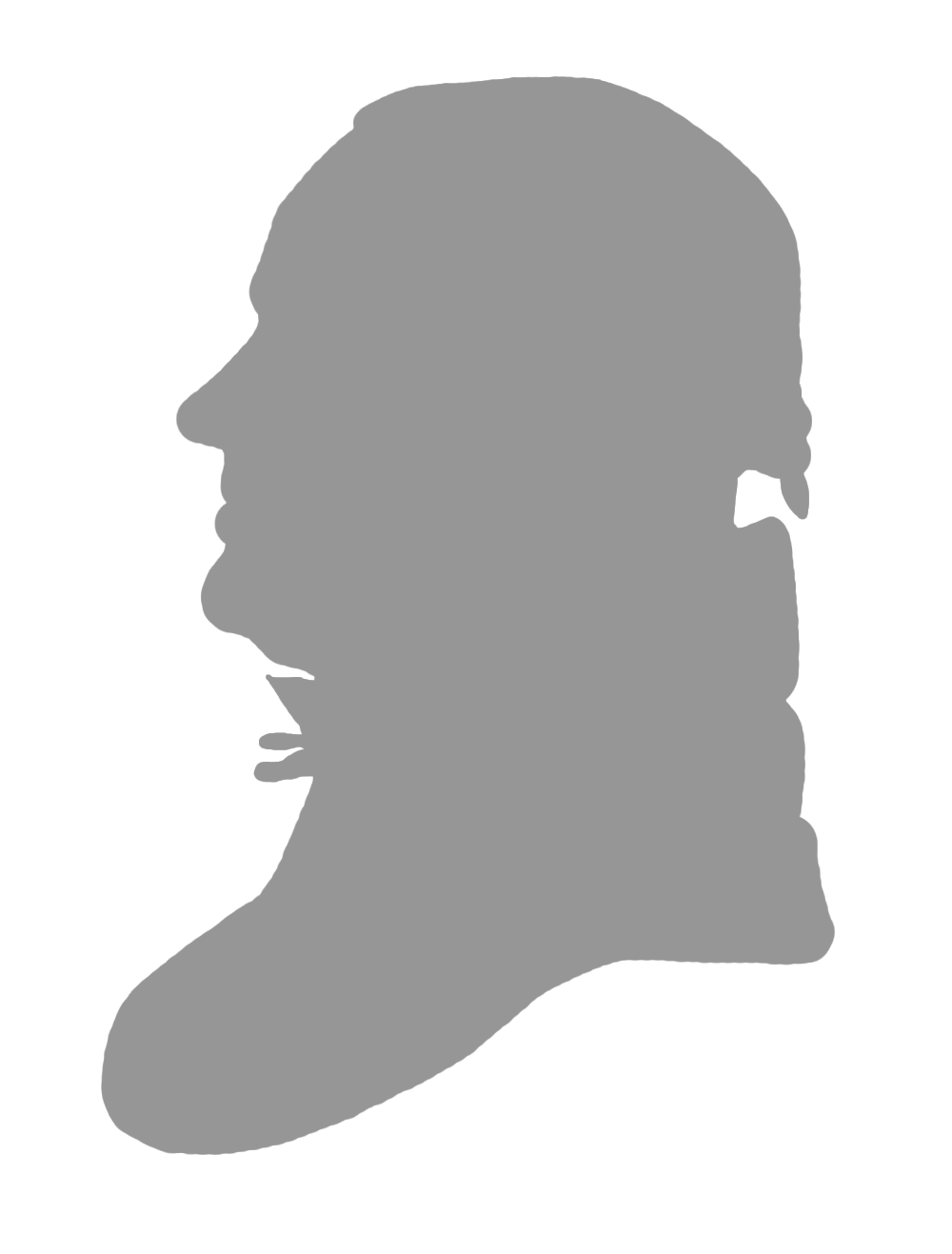
A silhouette of John Neville.

John Neville (July 26, 1731 – July 29, 1803) was an American military officer, land speculator, local official, and slave owner, who served in the French and Indian War, Lord Dunmore's War and the American Revolutionary War. As an early federal tax collector he became a central figure in the Whiskey Rebellion.

== Personal and family life ==
Neville's parents were Joseph Neville Sr. (son of John Neville and Elizabeth Bohannan) and Ann Bohannan of Gloucester County, Virginia. According to family tradition, Joseph had a brother George who was kidnapped from England as a boy, brought to Virginia, and married Hannah Burroughs, a cousin of Lord Fairfax of Cameron however this has been disputed by his descendants and is not supported by historical documents.

John Neville was born in Prince William County, Virginia on his father's land near the head of Bull Run. He had at least two sisters and five brothers, including Joseph Neville who also fought and settled on the Appalachian frontier.

In 1754, John Neville married Winifred Oldham, also of an established Tidewater Virginia family. They had a son (Presley Neville) and daughter Amelia Neville Knox who survived them.

== Career ==
As a local militia officer, he joined forces led by General Edward Braddock and Virginia colonel George Washington in the French and Indian War.

At the end of the war, the British treaty restricted settlement west of the Appalachian Mountains, so Neville settled in Frederick County, Virginia, made his home near Winchester (the county seat) and was elected sheriff.

When native American raids west of the Appalachian Mountains led to Lord Dunmore's War in 1774, Neville led the local militia. By the end of that war, he had acquired land in what became Pittsburgh but also maintained his residence in Winchester.

Both Virginia and Pennsylvania claimed land west of the Appalachian Mountains. Virginia called its claims West Augusta County, and when Governor Dunmore dissolved the House of Burgesses, voters in West Augusta County elected John Neville (and nonresident John Harvie) as their representatives in the Virginia Revolutionary Convention of 1775. However, Neville failed to appear at the week-long session in Richmond due to illness.

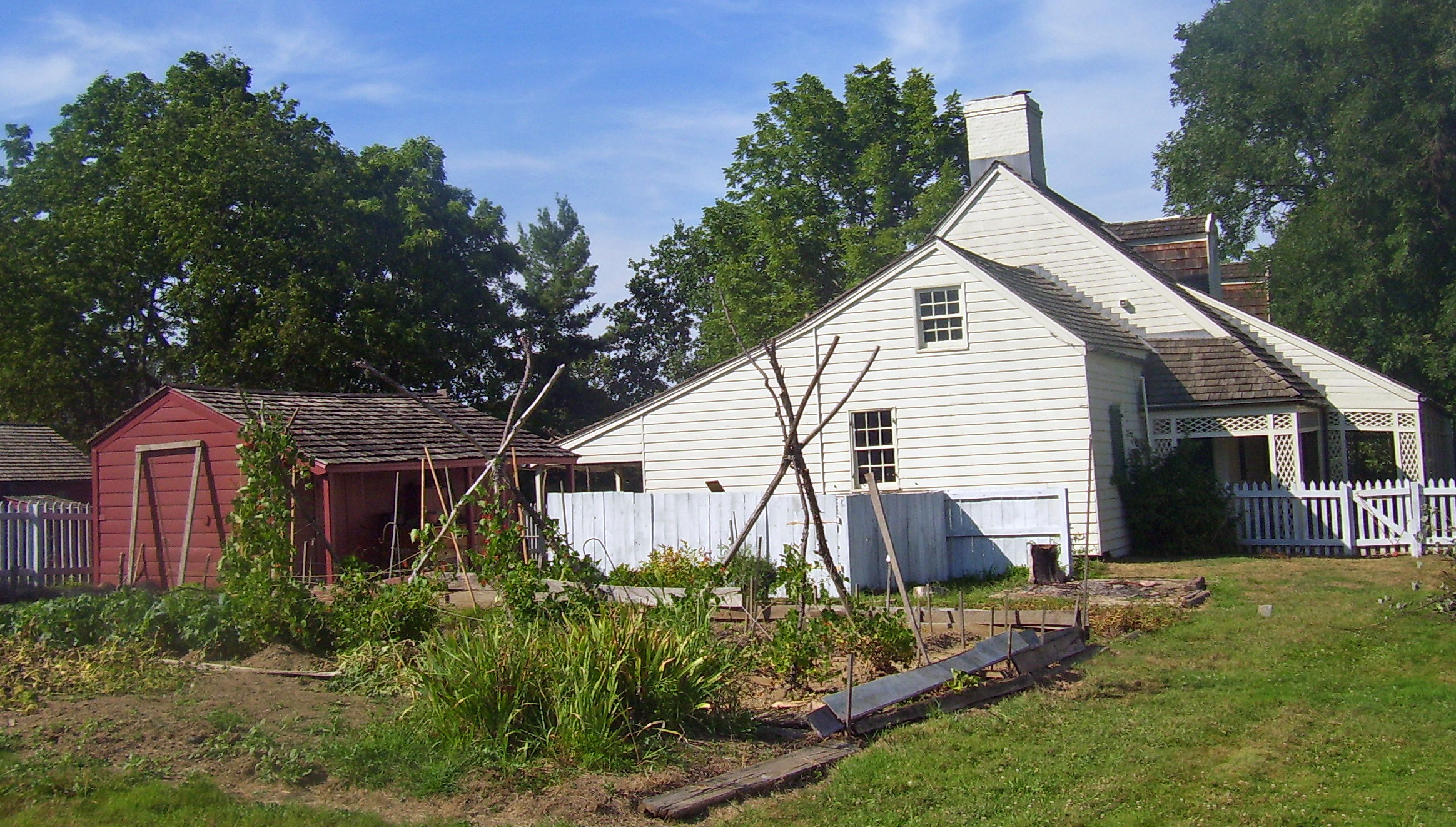
Woodville, Neville's initial home near Pittsburgh, built during the late 1770s

When the Revolutionary War began, Neville was captain of an independent company that was sent to defend Fort Pitt in 1775. In 1776, local residents offered Neville a commission as a Yohogania County justice, but he declined and continued his work as officer in charge of Fort Pitt. He would go on to serve in several regiments of the Virginia Line, being promoted to Lieutenant Colonel of the 12th Virginia Regiment in 1776, to Colonel of the 8th Virginia in 1777, and transferred to the 4th Virginia in 1778, seeing action at Trenton, Princeton, Germantown, and Monmouth. At the end of the Revolutionary War he was awarded a brevet promotion to brigadier general.

In 1783, Neville was elected to the Supreme Executive Council of Pennsylvania from Washington County. By 1787, both Virginia and Pennsylvania had ceded most of their claims to the trans-Appalachian region, which became the Northwest Territory. Surveyors Mason and Dixon established the Mason–Dixon line dividing Maryland (whose charter nominally ended at the Appalachians), and Pennsylvania. Subsequent surveys and negotiations placed Pittsburgh and what Virginia called Yohogania County in Pennsylvania, but the other two West Augusta Counties (Ohio County and Monongalia County in Virginia.

As a result of his family connections over the course of his life, Neville was "as close to being an aristocrat as republican America west of the Alleghenies would allow."

After the war, Neville accepted a job as an inspector of revenue under the excise laws, so he was ineligible to hold office in Virginia. The newly formed United States Congress taxed distilled spirits to help pay for the cost of the Revolutionary War. There were two methods of paying the whiskey excise: paying a flat charge or paying by the gallon. The tax effectively favored large distillers, most of whom were based in the east, who produced whiskey in volume and could afford the flat fee. Western farmers who owned small stills did not usually operate them at full capacity, so they ended up paying a higher tax per gallon. Thus, large producers ended up paying a tax of about 6 cents per gallon, while small producers were taxed at about 9 cents per gallon.

Events climaxed in 1794, according to Alexander Hamilton, when shots were fired at Neville and a U.S. Marshal he was escorting through the area to summon to court farmers who had not paid the tax. On July 16, 1794, a group of around fifty men surrounded the Neville mansion, demanding to see the US Marshal. The confrontation led to Neville's shooting of one of the protesters. Neville and his slaves were not injured during the fight. This further angered the people, and the next day, over 500 again surrounded the home. At least one more protester died, and Neville's home, Bower Hill, was burned to the ground, including the slave quarters.

This incident persuaded President George Washington to take the drastic action of leading a militia force of 13,000 men into western Pennsylvania to squelch the uprising. This response marked the first time under the new Constitution that the federal government had used a strong military presence to exert authority over the nation's citizens. In 1802, the tax was repealed.

== Legacy ==
Neville survived his wife, but died at his home on Neville Island in 1803. He is buried in Pittsburgh's Allegheny Cemetery.

Neville built two mansion-style homes near Pittsburgh. The first, "Bower Hill", was burned in 1794 during the Whiskey Rebellion, and the second, "Woodville", survives today; owned by the Neville House Associates, it is a National Historic Landmark.

Neville Island, Pennsylvania, is named after Gen. John Neville.

John Neville was a member of the Society of the Cincinnati in the State of Virginia.

| Preceded by Dorsey Pentecost | Member, Supreme Executive Council of Pennsylvania, representing Washington County; November 11, 1783 – November 20, 1786 | Succeeded by David Redick |
