= The Latimers =

1898 novel by Henry Christopher McCook

The Latimers: A Tale of the Western Insurrection of 1794
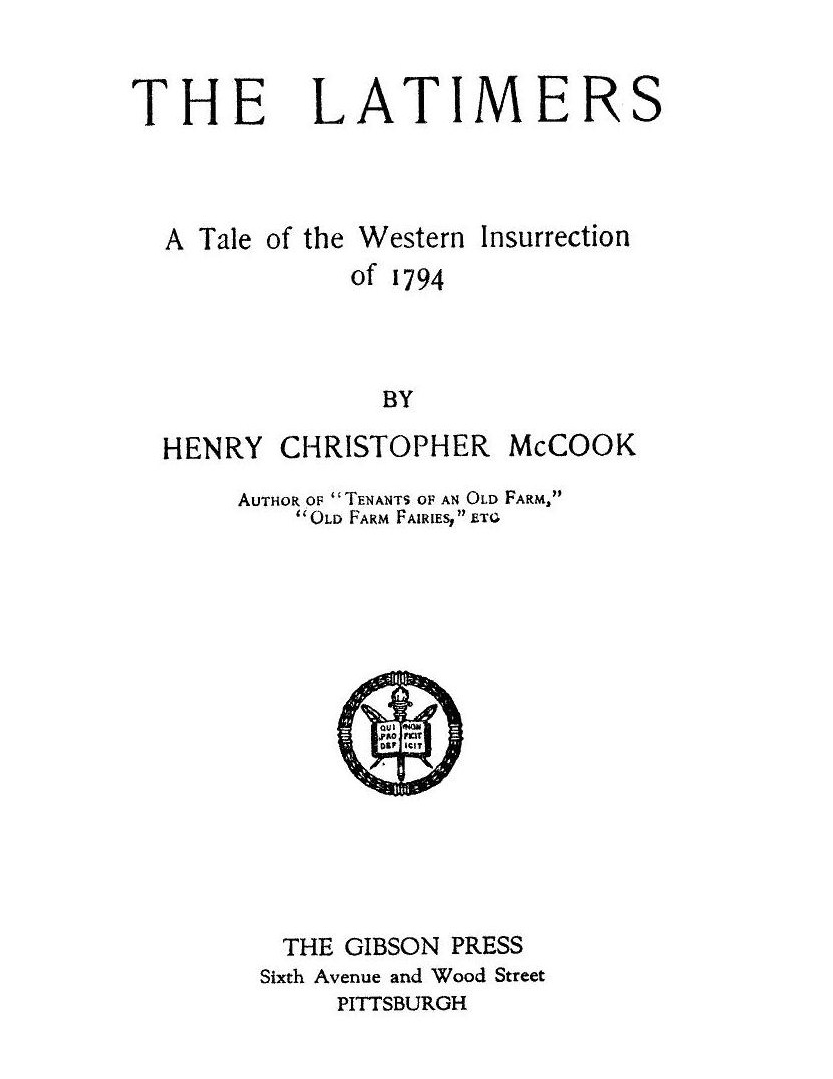
- Title page of the undated Pittsburgh reprint for The Latimers
- Author: Henry Christopher McCook
- Language: English
- Genre: Novel
- Publisher: George W. Jacobs & Co.
- Publication date: 1898
- Publication place: United States
- Media type: Print (hardback)
- Pages: 593
- OCLC: 611745

The Latimers : A Tale of the Western Insurrection of 1794 is an historical novel by the American writer and Presbyterian clergyman Henry Christopher McCook (1837–1911) set in 1790s Pittsburgh, Pennsylvania.

The novel tells the story of Scotch-Irish American pioneers during the Whiskey Rebellion.

== See also ==
Other novels that employ events of the Whiskey Rebellion:

- The Whiskey Rebels (2008)
- Wilderness Boy (1955)
- The Delectable Country (1939)
