= Woodville (Heidelberg, Pennsylvania) =

Historic house in Pennsylvania, United States

- U.S. National Register of Historic Places
- U.S. National Historic Landmark
- Pennsylvania state historical marker
- Pittsburgh Landmark – PHLF
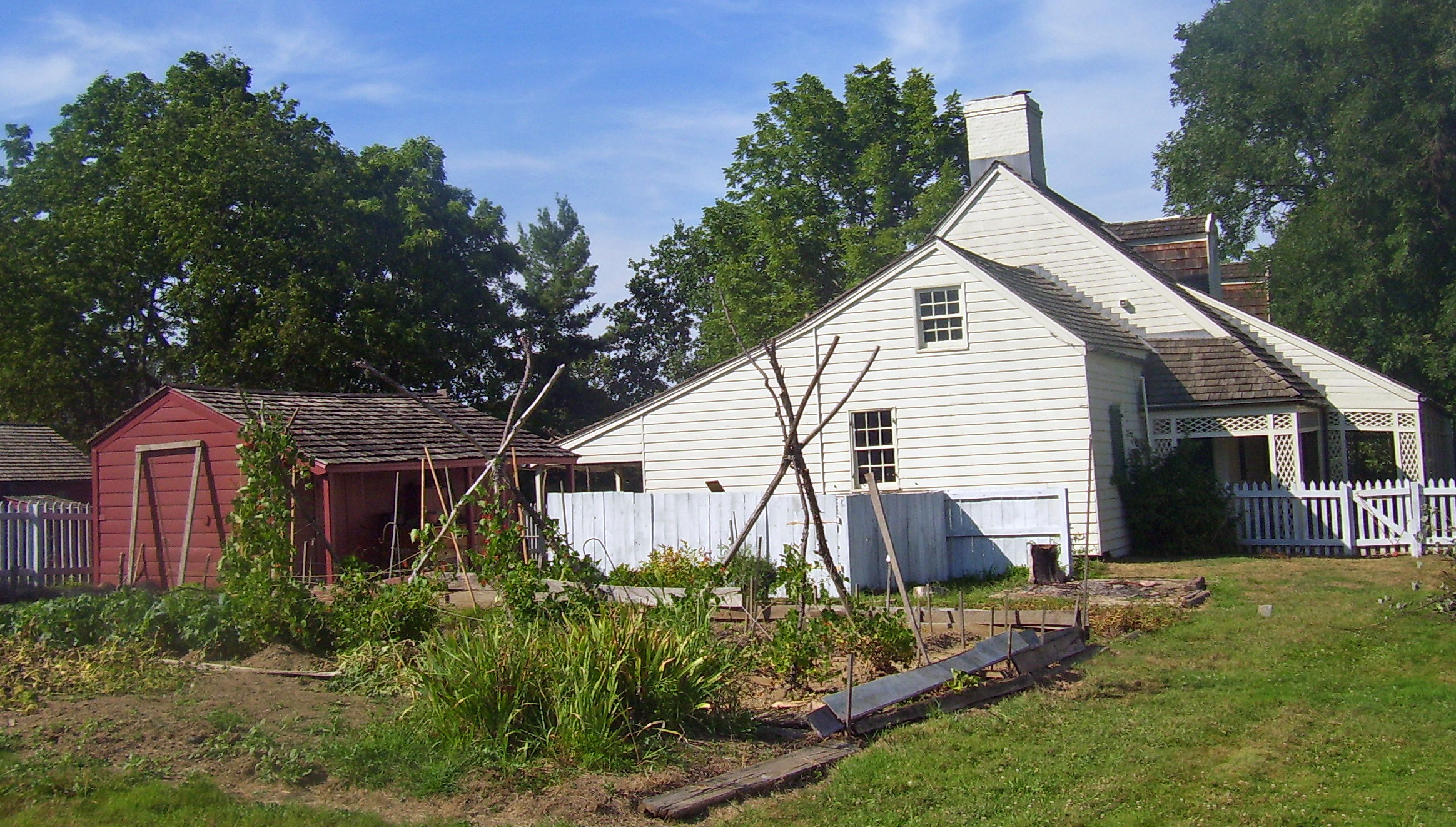
- South elevation of house, with kitchen wing, garden and outbuildings visible, 2008

- Location within Pennsylvania Location within the United States
- Nearest city: Heidelberg, Pennsylvania
- Coordinates: 40°22′47″N 80°5′47″W
- Built: 1785
- Architect: John Neville
- Architectural style: Colonial
- NRHP reference No.: 74001733

Significant dates
- Added to NRHP: February 5, 1974
- Designated NHL: July 28, 1983
- Designated PHMC: August 12, 1947
- Designated PHLF: 1976

Woodville, also known as the Neville House or John Neville House, is a house which is located on Washington Pike (PA 50) south of Heidelberg, Pennsylvania, United States. It is significant for its association with John Neville, a tax collector whose other house was burned in the Whiskey Rebellion in 1794. The oldest portion of the house dates to 1775, with a main section built a decade later.

It is one of the oldest houses in Allegheny County, preserved and restored to its original condition.

For those reasons, it was declared a National Historic Landmark in 1983. After being significantly renovated by an early 19th-century resident, it remained a private house until 1975. Today it is a historic house museum.

== Building ==
The house is located on a one-acre (4,000 m^{2}) lot on the west side of the highway. There is a small gravel parking lot on the south side, with a hedge to buffer it from some modern commercial buildings. The west and north sides border on woodlands.

Woodville is a one-and-a-half-story frame house with moderately pitched gable roof pierced by four dormer windows and two brick chimneys at either end. A full veranda stretches across the east (front) elevation, and a one-story kitchen wing projects from the south, with a small garden next to it.

Inside, the house follows a center-hall plan. The stairway rises from the hall to the upstairs bedrooms. A large living room occupies the north side of the first story; a dining room and another smaller room are on the north. The kitchen is located in the wing; slaves slept in the garret above it. All the interior rooms have been restored to their original furnishing.

== History ==
Neville came to the region in 1774 from Winchester, Virginia, shortly after buying 14,000 acres (5,700 ha) five miles (8.0 km) south of Fort Pitt, located at the forks of the Ohio in what is today downtown Pittsburgh. He took command of the fort on behalf of the Colony of Virginia the next year, and served in that capacity until Edward Hand relieved him in 1777. Neville was an officer of the Continental Army for the rest of the Revolutionary War. During this time it is believed the present farmhouse at Woodville was also built, since Neville reported a tenfold increase in his slave holdings in 1780.

In 1783, Neville retired shortly after reaching the rank of brigadier general. Three years later, the name "Woodville" was used on the land patent, and was mentioned in a report in the Pittsburgh Gazette when his sister-in-law was married at the house. He built another home, Bower Hill, and let his son Presley live in Woodville. During the 1780s he continued his public career, serving in several posts, including as representative to the Pennsylvania Constitutional Convention in 1787.

He was named federal revenue inspector for a district comprising Allegheny, Bedford, Washington and Westmoreland counties. This put him in the position of collecting the excise tax on whiskey imposed at Alexander Hamilton's suggestion to pay off the states' war debts. Since it favored large producers over small farmers, it was unpopular with many of the farmers of Western Pennsylvania, who often had no other way of getting their grain to market. In the early 1790s this led to the Whiskey Rebellion. Farmers marched on Woodville in 1794. Neville and his servants fought them off, but were unable to protect Bower Hill from being burned down despite reinforcements by soldiers from Fort Fayette. George Washington eventually sent in the Army to put the rebellion down, an occurrence seen as the first test of federal authority under the newly adopted Constitution.

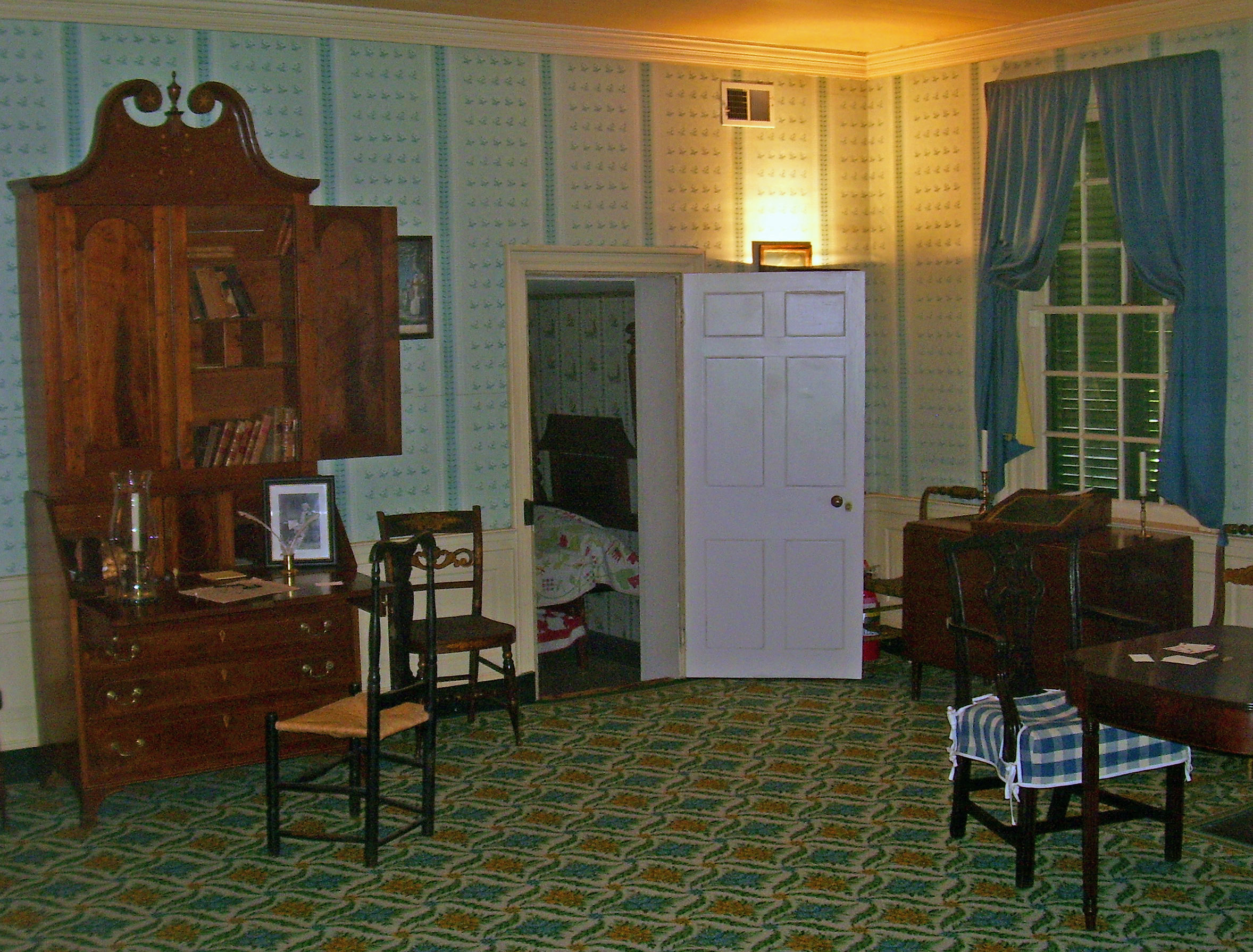
Living room

Four years later, an assessment for the Direct Tax of 1798 shows the house at its present dimensions. Thomas Jones, probably an overseer or caretaker, is listed as the resident. In 1814, it was sold to Stephen Barlow, a director of the Bank of the United States, for $12,000 ($184,000 in contemporary dollars). He, in turn, sold it two years later to Christopher Cowan at a $2,000 profit.

Over the next decade, Cowan significantly renovated the house. He added a shed to the north wall and extended the south wall seven feet (2.1 m) to connect the house and the kitchen. Some effects of this can still be seen in the house today. On the outside, it was painted white and the porch added to the east side. A storehouse was also built.

His daughter inherited the house when he died in 1835. Members of the Cowan family continued to live there for almost a century and a half. They made some changes to the exterior, such as repainting it brown and then yellow, and adding some Victorian Gothic touches like the porch latticework and the lancet windows on some of the dormers. A married couple that lived in the house during the mid-20th century had modern heating and plumbing installed.

In 1975, shortly after it was first listed on the National Register of Historic Places, the last Cowan descendants moved out. The house had already become the property of the Pittsburgh History and Landmarks Foundation, which began operating it as a historic house museum. It became a National Historic Landmark in 1983.

In the early 21st century, it was transferred to another not-for-profit, Neville House Associates, a smaller organization which is focused only on Woodville. NHA oversaw restorations that included painting the house white again and bringing in an early 19th-century pianoforte similar to the one Cowan had bought.

It is a stop on the American Whiskey Trail.

== See also ==
- List of National Historic Landmarks in Pennsylvania
- National Register of Historic Places listings in Allegheny County, Pennsylvania
