= The Ethical Assassin =

American novel

- First edition
- Author: David Liss
- Published: 2006 (Ballantine Books)

The Ethical Assassin is a 2006 novel written by David Liss that revolves around Lemuel (Lem) Atlick, a door to door encyclopedia salesman who is caught in the middle of an assassination and becomes a sole witness. The novel is a major departure from the series of economic history adventures Liss had previously written and a venture into black humor and modern satire.
