= The Whiskey Rebels =

Historical novel

- Author: David Liss
- Language: English
- Genre: Historical novel
- Publisher: Random House
- Publication date: 2008
- Publication place: United States
- Media type: Print (Hardback)
- Pages: 525
- ISBN: 978-1-4000-6420-5
- OCLC: 176952083

The Whiskey Rebels is a 2008 historical novel by American writer David Liss, inspired by events in the early history of the United States. According to Liss (from the 'Historical Note' following the novel), "This novel, in many respects, details the events that led up to the Whiskey Rebellion of 1794".

== Synopsis ==
Despite the title, the novel's action does not include the Whiskey Rebellion of 1794; it is set mainly in the preceding years from 1788 to 1792. Two main fictional characters, Ethan Saunders and Joan Maycott, offer first-person narratives that begin separately, in alternating chapters, and gradually come together for the climactic scenes. The reader first meets Ethan Saunders in 1792 Philadelphia, the temporary capital of the newly formed United States of America. Saunders is a disgraced former spy for General Washington during the American Revolution, now a drunkard and scoundrel but still seeking redemption.

Joan Maycott's autobiography begins at the age of seventeen near Albany, New York in 1781. Her life takes her to New York City and to the frontier town of Pittsburgh, in Western Pennsylvania. After many travails, she returns to New York City and on to Philadelphia, where she eventually meets Saunders. Along the way, we learn about the duplicity of speculators like William Duer, the hardships of life in the western wilderness and the use of whiskey as a form of frontier currency. We learn why the western pioneers hated the Bank of the United States, the Whiskey tax, and Treasury Secretary Alexander Hamilton, creator of both. This hatred gives birth to an audacious secret plan to (as Joan sees it) free the new nation from the corrupting influence of the financiers and speculators of the cities, and return to the republican purity intended by the founders. The climactic events take place against the historical backdrop of Duer's attempt to take over the national bank, which led to the Panic of 1792.

The fictional Ethan and Joan meet many historical characters in addition to Duer and Hamilton, including frontier champion Hugh Henry Brackenridge, Jeffersonian journalist Philip Freneau, wealthy socialite Anne Bingham, Hamilton blackmailer James Reynolds, his seductive wife Maria and Senator (at that time) Aaron Burr.

== Awards and nominations ==
- Nominated for the Sue Feder Memorial Historical Mystery award for 2009. Macavity Awards (accessed 08-2010)

== See also ==
Novels that include events of the Whiskey Rebellion:

- Wilderness Boy (1955)
- The Delectable Country (1939)
- The Latimers (1898)
