= The Delectable Country =

1939 American Historical Fiction best-seller

- First edition
- Author: Leland Baldwin
- Language: English
- Genre: Novel
- Publisher: Lee Furman, Inc.
- Publication date: 1939
- Publication place: United States
- Media type: Print (hardback)
- Pages: 715
- OCLC: 1053523

The Delectable Country is an historical novel by the American writer Leland Baldwin (1897–1981) set in Pittsburgh, Pennsylvania.

The Whiskey Rebellion is brewing in the 1790s as protagonist David Braddee, aged nineteen, pilots his foster father's keelboat to a difficult landing at the frontier town of Pittsburgh, after a trip up the Mississippi and Ohio Rivers from New Orleans.

== See also ==
Other novels that employ events of the Whiskey Rebellion:

- The Whiskey Rebels (2008)
- Wilderness Boy (1955)
- The Latimers (1898)
