= David Liss =

American writer

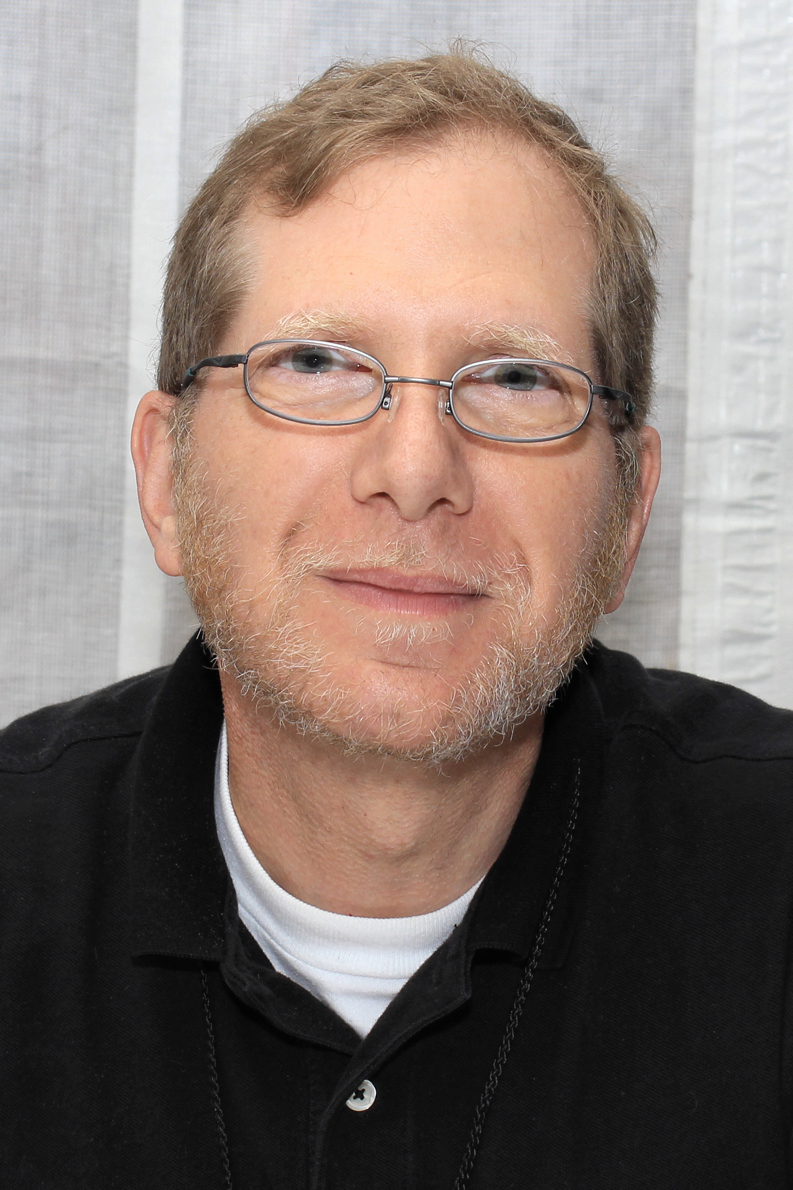
- Liss at the 2016 Texas Book Festival
- Born: March 16, 1966 (age 60); New Jersey, United States
- Citizenship: United States
- Education: Syracuse University (BA); Georgia State University (MA); Columbia University (MPhil)
- Occupations: Writer, author
- Writing career
- Genres: Thriller, mystery, Historical fiction, comic books
- Website: davidliss.com

David Liss (born March 16, 1966) is an American writer of novels, essays and short fiction; more recently working also in comic books. He was born in New Jersey and grew up in South Florida. Liss received his BA degree from Syracuse University, an MA from Georgia State University and his M. Phil from Columbia University. He left his post-graduate studies of 18th Century British literature and unfinished dissertation to write full-time. "If things had not worked out with fiction, I probably would have kept to my graduate school career track and sought a job as a literature professor," he said. A full-time writer since 2010, Liss lives in San Antonio, Texas, with his wife and children.

Most of Liss' novels are historical-mystery (or historical-thriller) novels. Settings include 18th-century London and America and 17th-century Amsterdam. One novel, The Ethical Assassin, is a modern mystery-thriller. His first book, A Conspiracy of Paper (2000), won the 2001 Edgar Award for Best First Novel. A member of the International Thriller Writers, he is a regular attendee at Bouchercon and Thrillerfest.

== Works ==
=== Novels ===
- A Conspiracy of Paper (2000)
- The Coffee Trader (2003)
- A Spectacle of Corruption (2004)
- The Ethical Assassin (2006)
- The Whiskey Rebels (2008)
- The Devil's Company (2009)
- The Twelfth Enchantment (2011)
- The Day of Atonement (2014)
- Randoms (2015)
- Rebels (2016)
- Renegades (2017)
- Spider-Man: Hostile Takeover (2018)
- The Peculiarities (2021)
- The Death and Birth of Iliana Marek (2026)

=== Short fiction ===
- "The Double Dealer", in the anthology Thriller.
- "What Maisie Knew", in the anthology The New Dead, edited by Christopher Golden. ISBN 978-0-312-55971-7
- "Watchlist: A Serial Thriller". ISBN 978-1-59315-559-9 (Collaborator)
- "A Bad Season for Necromancy", in the anthology Four Summoner's Tales. ISBN 978-1-4516-9668-4
- "Hollow Choices", with Robert Jackson Bennett, first published in Dark Duets: All-New Tales of Horror and Dark Fantasy, Harper Voyager, 2014
- "Dead Man's Pecker", first published in Dark Discoveries, issue #26, 2014

=== Comic books ===
- The Daring Mystery Comics 70th Anniversary Special, featuring The Phantom Reporter, published by Marvel Comics (January 2010)
- Black Panther: The Man Without Fear (which became Black Panther: The Most Dangerous Man Alive) #513–529, ongoing series, published by Marvel Comics (February 2011 – April 2012)
- Mystery Men, 5-issue limited series with Patrick Zircher, published by Marvel Comics (August–November 2011) tpb: hardcover ISBN 978-0785162933, soft cover ISBN 978-0785147459
- The Spider, comic book series, with Colton Worley, published by Dynamite Entertainment (May 2012 – March 2014)
- The Shadow Now, 6-issue limited series, with Colton Worley, Dynamite Entertainment (October 2013 – April 2014)
- Sherlock Holmes: Moriarty Lives, 5-issue limited series, with Daniel Indro, published by Dynamite Entertainment (December 2013 – July 2014)
