= A Conspiracy of Paper =

Historical mystery novel

- First edition
- Author: David Liss
- Language: English
- Genre: Historical, mystery
- Published: 2000 (Random House)
- Publication place: United States
- Media type: Print (hardcover)
- Pages: 448 pp
- ISBN: 0-375-50292-0
- OCLC: 41118354
- Dewey Decimal: 813/.6 21
- LC Class: PS3562.I7814 C66 2000

A Conspiracy of Paper is a historical mystery novel by David Liss, set in London in the period leading up to the bursting of the South Sea Bubble in 1720.

== Synopsis ==
The novel's story is told in the form of a first-person memoir penned by Benjamin Weaver (born Lienzo), London-born son of Portuguese Sephardic Jewish parents. After a successful career in bare-knuckle boxing, Weaver has found a new calling as a 'thief-taker'—roughly equivalent to a modern private investigator. Believing that his estranged father died in a tragic accident, Weaver is shocked when a prospective client claims that the 'accident' was, in fact, murder. Weaver's subsequent investigation involves him in the new London financial world of banks, stocks, speculation, violence and scandal leading up to the world's first stock-market crash, the South Sea Bubble. In order to solve the mystery, he must learn the inner workings of this new world of paper money. The murder investigation moves toward its conclusion in lock-step with the accelerating frenzy of the Bubble's final days.

A sub-plot involves Benjamin's gradual reintegration, after years of estrangement, into his family's community and traditions. This gives the author the opportunity to introduce the Lienzo family, and their struggles to survive and prosper as Jews and foreigners in 18th century London. Benjamin finds added incentive to rejoin his family when he meets the beautiful Miriam, widow of his cousin and now living in his uncle Miguel's household.

Eventually, Weaver goes back to live in the Jewish area of Dukes Place, feeling less out of place there than anywhere else. As referenced in David Liss' extensive personal note at the end of the book, this slightly parallels the author's own personal development - raised as a completely secular Jew in the present-day US and deciding as an adult to keep some of the observances of Judaism.

== Real world ties ==
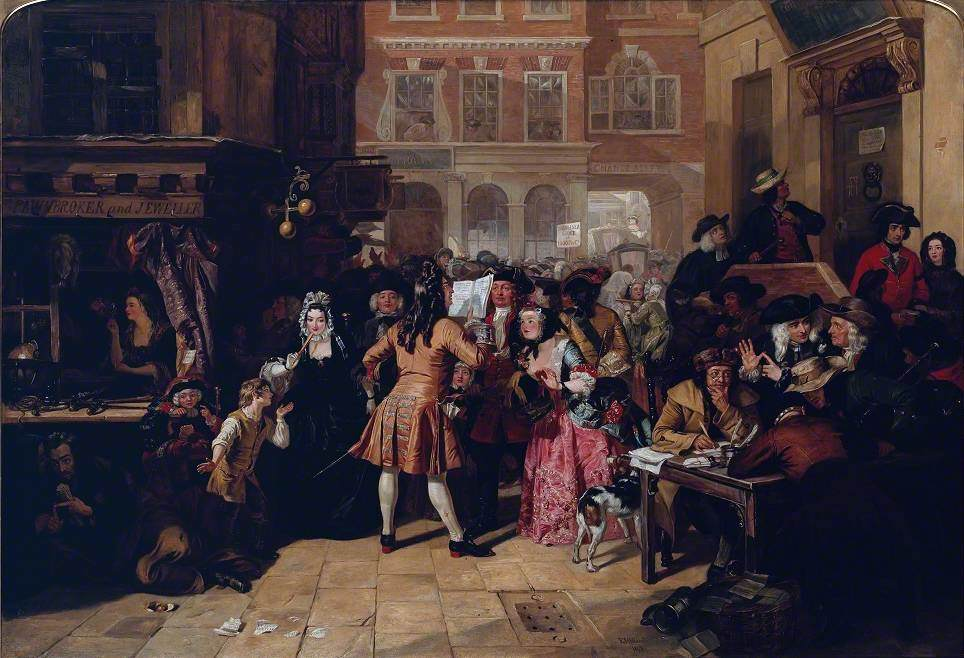
The South Sea Bubble by Edward Matthew Ward, 1847

Though the Lienzo family and other main characters are fictional, the story is well-researched, and includes historical events surrounding the South Sea Bubble. The early days of the London Stock Exchange in the coffee houses of Exchange Alley are colorfully depicted, and Weaver has to deal with historical characters such as Jonathan Wild, the notorious 'Thief-taker General'. In the 'Historical Note' following the novel, regarding the Benjamin Weaver character, Liss states that "I found inspiration for his character in the story of Daniel Mendoza", a real-life boxing champion.

=== Explanation of the novel's title ===
The title alludes to the South Sea Company's fraudulent schemes to inflate and maintain the value of its stock.

== Awards and nominations ==
- Best First Mystery Novel 2001. Macavity Awards
- Best First Novel 2001. Edgar Awards
