= Pennsylvania Route 151 =

State highway in Beaver County, Pennsylvania, US

Pennsylvania Route 151

Route information
- Maintained by PennDOT
- Length: 13.322 mi (21.440 km)

Major junctions
- West end: US 30 near Harshaville
- PA 18 near Harshaville; I-376 in Gringo
- East end: PA 51 near South Heights

Location
- Country: United States
- State: Pennsylvania
- Counties: Beaver

Highway system
- Pennsylvania State Route System; Interstate; US; State; Scenic; Legislative
← PA 150	→ PA 152

Pennsylvania Route 151 (PA 151) is a 13.3-mile-long (21.4 km) state highway located in Beaver County, Pennsylvania. The western terminus of the route is at US 30 near Harshaville. The eastern terminus is at PA 51 in South Heights. The route heads through a mix of suburban and rural areas of southern Beaver County as a two-lane road except at the junction with I-376 near Gringo.

== Route description ==
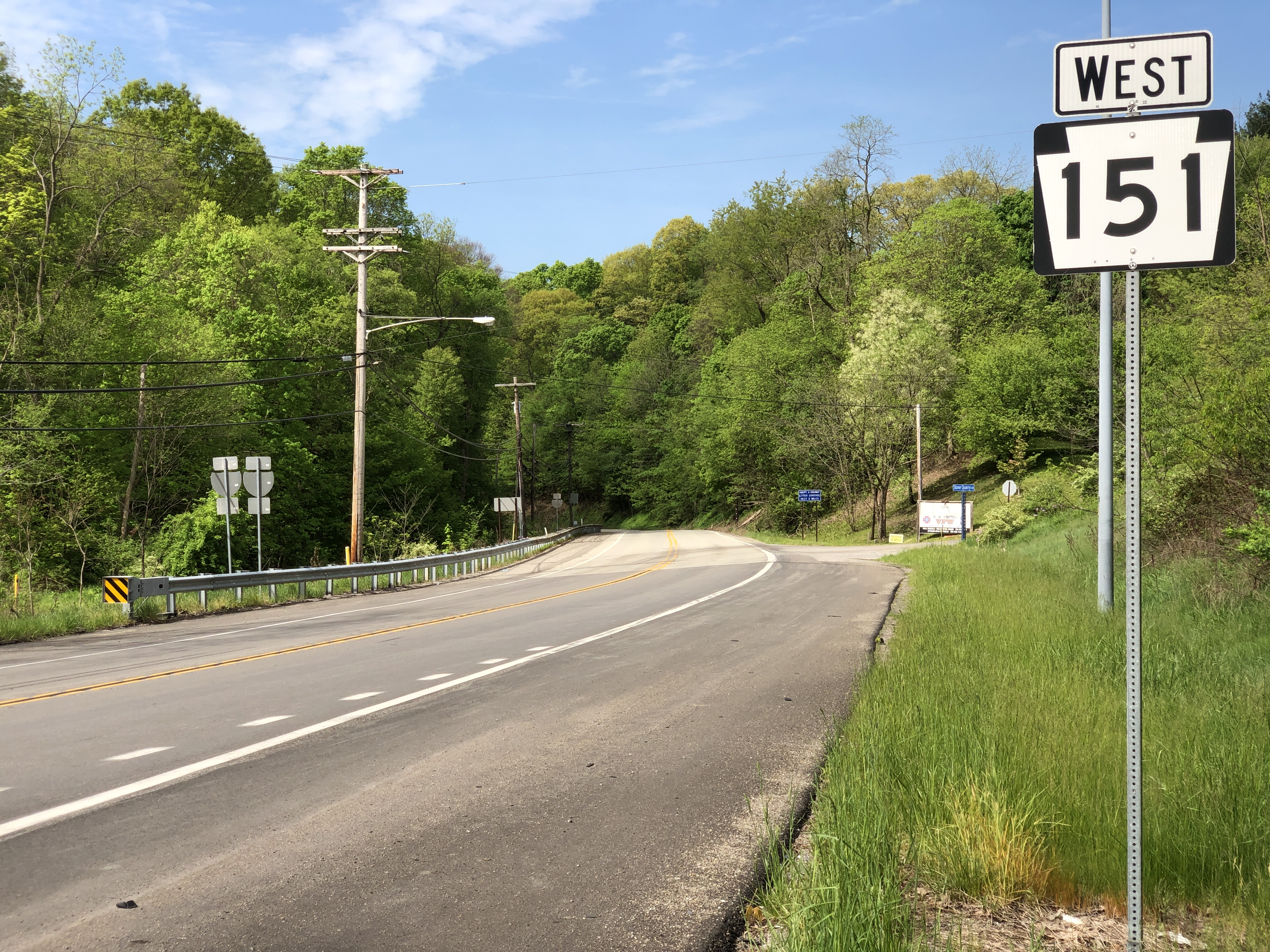
PA 151 westbound past I-376 in Gringo

PA 151 begins at an intersection with US 30 in Greene Township, heading east on two-lane undivided Bocktown Road. The road passes north of South Side High School and heads through forested areas with some farms and homes, crossing into Raccoon Township and intersecting PA 18. Past this intersection, the route continues southeast through more rural areas, passing through the northeastern corner of Hanover Township before heading east into Independence Township. PA 151 heads through a mix of farmland and woodland with a few residences, reaching the community of Bocktown. Here, the route turns to the south before heading northeast through forested areas and entering Hopewell Township and becoming Gringo Road. PA 151 comes to an interchange with I-376, where it briefly widens to four lanes, and continues into the community of Gringo, passing a mix of homes and businesses. The route makes a turn east onto Laurel Road and heads through woodland. PA 151 reaches its eastern terminus at an intersection with PA 51 on the border of Hopewell Township and the borough of South Heights, just north of the Beaver/Allegheny County line.

== Major intersections ==
The entire route is in Beaver County.

Location	mi	km	Destinations	Notes
Greene Township	0.000	0.000	US 30 (Lincoln Highway)	Western terminus
Raccoon Township	2.384	3.837	PA 18 (Frankfort Road) – Washington, Monaca	
Hopewell Township	10.395	16.729	I-376 (Beaver Valley Expressway) – Pittsburgh, New Castle	Exit 48 (I-376)
Hopewell Township	13.322	21.440	PA 51 (Jordan Street)	Eastern terminus
1.000 mi = 1.609 km; 1.000 km = 0.621 mi
