= Haimovich =

Ashkenazi Jewish patronymic surname

Haimovich is an Ashkenazi Jewish surname from the Slavic patronymic Haimovich (son of Haim). Variants include Chaimovich, Haimovitz, and Hymowitz. Notable people with the surname include:

== Chaimovich ==
- Arnold Ephraim Chaimovich (1906–2002), birth name of American mathematician Arnold Ross
- Vadim Chaimovich (born 1978), Lithuanian pianist

== Chaimowicz ==
- Marc Camille Chaimowicz (1946–2024), French artist

== Chamovitz ==
- Daniel Chamovitz (born 1963), Israeli biologist
- Shira Yalon-Chamovitz (born 1962), Israeli occupational therapist

== Haimovich ==
- Dafna Haimovich (born 1948), Israeli writer
- Gili Haimovich (poet) (born 1974), Israeli poet
- Miki Haimovich (born 1962), Israeli politician and television presenter
- Sergio Haimovich (born 1968), Israeli gynecologist
- Shmuel Haimovich (director) (born 1968), Israeli director
- Ze'ev Haimovich (born 1983), Israeli footballer
- Zvika Haimovich (born 1966), Israeli brigadier general

== Haimovici ==
- Hieronim Haimovici (1893–1950), birth name of Romanian writer H. Bonciu

== Haimovitz ==
- Gili Haimovitz (born 1993), Israeli martial artist
- Matt Haimovitz (born 1970), Israeli-American celloist
- Shmuel Haimovitz, Israeli Paralympian

== Hymowitz ==
- Gregg Hymowitz (born 1965), American investment banker
- Kay Hymowitz (born 1948), American author
