= Hopewell Area School District =

School district in Pennsylvania

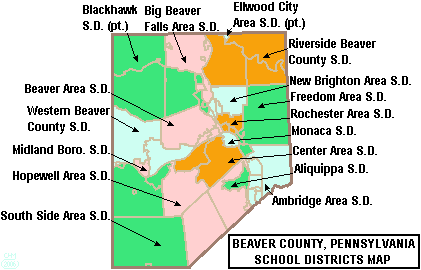

Address
- 2354 Brodhead Road Aliquippa, Pennsylvania, 15002; United States

District information
- Superintendent: Dr. Maura Hobson

Students and staff
- District mascot: Viking
- Colors: Blue and gold

Other information
- Website: www.hopewellarea.org

Hopewell Area School District is a small, suburban public school district located in Beaver County, Pennsylvania, United States. It serves the townships of Hopewell, Raccoon, and Independence. Hopewell Area School District encompasses approximately 62 square miles (160 km^{2}). According to 2000 federal census data, it serves a resident population of 19,453. In 2009, the district residents’ per capita income was $20,145, while the median family income was $53,197. In the commonwealth, the median family income was $49,501 and the United States median family income was $49,445, in 2010.

== Schools ==
The district operates five schools.

- Hopewell Elementary
- Independence Elementary
- Margaret Ross Elementary
- Hopewell Memorial Junior High School
- Hopewell High School

The district's facilities include an indoor pool which is made available to the public.
