= Gringo, Pennsylvania =

Unincorporated community in Pennsylvania, U.S.

Coordinates: 40°33′50″N 80°16′17″W

Gringo is an unincorporated community in Hopewell Township, Beaver County, Pennsylvania, United States. It is located along Pennsylvania Route 151, near the border with Raccoon Township. The area was the site of an oil field in the late 19th and early 20th centuries; there was at least one functioning well operating until the 1960s. The community has disappeared from most contemporary maps, but lives on in the name of Gringo Road and a few business names.
