= Harshaville, Pennsylvania =

Unincorporated community in Pennsylvania, U.S.

Coordinates: 40°32′30″N 80°24′38″W

Harshaville is an unincorporated community in Hanover Township, Beaver County, Pennsylvania, United States. It is located near the junction of Pennsylvania Route 18 and U.S. Route 30, near Raccoon Creek State Park. The community is located at the terminus of Pennsylvania Route 151.
