= Independence Township, Pennsylvania =

Independence Township is the name of some places in the U.S. state of Pennsylvania:

- Independence Township, Beaver County, Pennsylvania
- Independence Township, Washington County, Pennsylvania
