= Curt Singer =

American football player (born 1961)

No. 74, 72, 73
- Position: Offensive tackle

Personal information
- Born: November 4, 1961 (age 65); Aliquippa, Pennsylvania, U.S.
- Listed height: 6 ft 5 in (1.96 m)
- Listed weight: 278 lb (126 kg)

Career information
- High school: Hopewell (Aliquippa)
- College: Tennessee
- NFL draft: 1984: 6th round, 167th overall pick

Career history
- Washington Redskins (1984); Seattle Seahawks (1986–1987); Detroit Lions (1988); Seattle Seahawks (1989)*; New York Jets (1989); Seattle Seahawks (1990–1991)
- * Offseason or practice squad member only
- Stats at Pro Football Reference

Curt Edward Singer (born November 4, 1961) is an American former professional football offensive tackle who played in the National Football League (NFL) with the Seattle Seahawks, Detroit Lions, and New York Jets. He played college football for the Tennessee Volunteers and was selected by the Washington Redskins in the sixth round of the 1984 NFL draft.

== Early life ==
Curt Edward Singer was born on November 4, 1961, in Aliquippa, Pennsylvania. He was a Tennessee Volunteers fan as a child. He played three years of varsity football at Hopewell High School in Aliquippa as a two-way lineman, earning All-WPIAL honors. Singer also played baseball as a pitcher and led the team to a postseason victory over Dan Marino and Central Catholic High School.

== College career ==
Singer enrolled at the University of Tennessee to play college football for the Volunteers. He was a four-year letterman and three-year starter from 1980 to 1983.

== Professional career ==
Singer was selected by the Washington Redskins in the sixth round, with the 167th overall pick, of the 1984 NFL draft. He signed with the team on June 26. He was placed on injured reserve on August 28 and missed the entire 1984 season. Singer was released on August 20, 1985, after suffering a herniated disc.

Singer signed with the Seattle Seahawks on April 15, 1986. He played in 11 games as a reserve offensive tackle in 1986 and was called for three penalties. He was placed on injured reserve again on September 8, 1987, missing the entire 1987 season. Singer was released by the Seahawks on August 30, 1988, after the final preseason game.

Singer was signed by the Detroit Lions on September 15, 1988, and played in three games during the 1988 season. On July 28, 1989, he was traded to the Seahawks for an undisclosed draft pick. He was released on September 5, 1989, before the start of the regular season.

Singer signed with the New York Jets on November 6, 1989. He appeared in six games, starting one, for New York in 1989. He became a free agent after the 1989 season, and re-signed with the Jets on July 20, 1990. Singer was released on September 3, 1990.

Singer signed with the Seahawks again on September 26, 1990. He was on the team's active roster during the 1990 season but did not play in any games. He appeared in 13 games for Seattle in 1991. Singer became a free agent after the 1991 season.

== Personal life ==
Singer was inducted into the Beaver County Sports Hall of Fame in 1999.
