= Crescent Township, Pennsylvania =

Township in Pennsylvania, US

Crescent Township
- Township
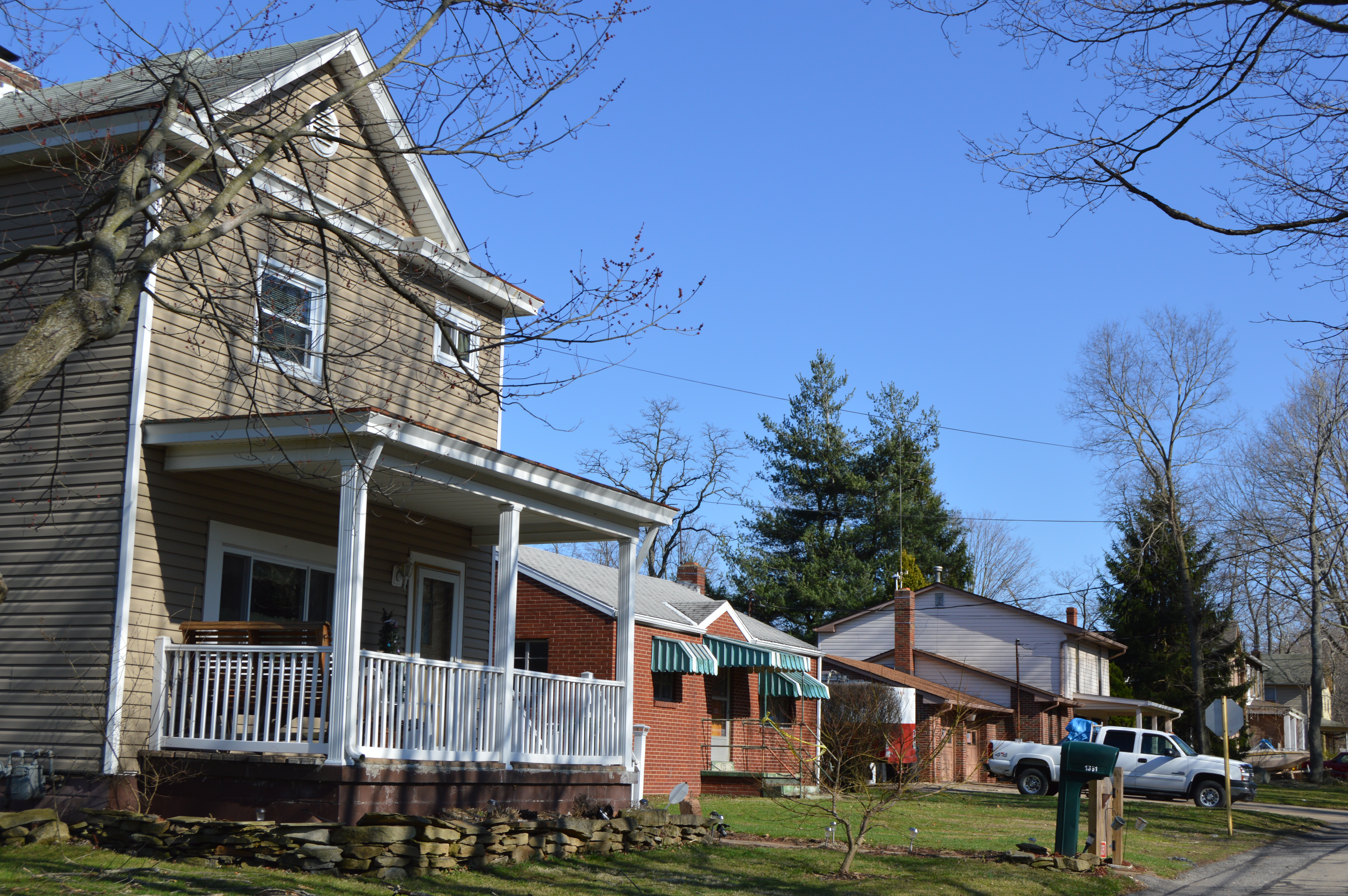
- Houses on Front Street in Glenwillard

- Flag Logo

- Location in Allegheny County and state of Pennsylvania
- Coordinates: 40°34′0″N 80°13′47″W
- Country: United States
- State: Pennsylvania
- County: Allegheny

Government
  - Type: Board of Commissioners
  - President: Todd Miller (D)

Area
  - Total: 2.28 sq mi (5.90 km^{2})
  - Land: 2.09 sq mi (5.42 km^{2})
  - Water: 0.19 sq mi (0.48 km^{2})

Population (2020)
  - Total: 2,479
  - Estimate (2024): 2,394
  - Density: 1,185/sq mi (457.6/km^{2})
- Time zone: UTC-5 (Eastern (EST))
  - Summer (DST): UTC-4 (EDT)
- FIPS code: 42-003-17048
- Website: crescenttownship.com

Crescent Township is a township in Allegheny County, Pennsylvania, United States, and is part of the Pittsburgh Metro Area. The population was 2,479 at the 2020 census.

The township was created in 1855 and was given the name Crescent because it was formed from a portion of Moon Township. Crescent Township has been assigned the ZIP code 15046.

Crescent Township has three unincorporated villages:

- Glenwillard
- Wireton
- Shouse

Crescent is part of the Pittsburgh Metropolitan Statistical Area.

== Education ==
Students living in Crescent Township attend the Moon Area School District.

== Government and politics ==
Presidential elections results
| Year | Republican | Democratic | Third parties |
|---|---|---|---|
| 2020 | 55% 791 | 43% 614 | 1% 20 |
| 2016 | 55% 720 | 44% 529 | 4% 54 |
| 2012 | 56% 685 | 44% 539 | 0% 9 |

== Geography ==
According to the United States Census Bureau, the township has a total area of 2.3 square miles (6.0 km^{2}), of which 2.1 square miles (5.4 km^{2}) is land and 0.2 square miles (0.52 km^{2}), or 8.11%, is water.

=== Surrounding and adjacent neighborhoods ===
Crescent Township has three land borders, including Moon Township to the south, southeast and southwest and the Beaver County neighborhoods of South Heights to the north and Hopewell Township to the northwest. Across the Ohio River to the northeast, Crescent Township runs adjacent with Leetsdale.

== Education ==
Crescent Township is served by the Moon Area School District.

== Demographics ==
Historical population
| Census | Pop. | Note | %± |
|---|---|---|---|
| 1860 | 324 | | — |
| 1870 | 364 | | 12.3% |
| 1880 | 419 | | 15.1% |
| 1890 | 785 | | 87.4% |
| 1900 | 622 | | −20.8% |
| 1910 | 893 | | 43.6% |
| 1920 | 980 | | 9.7% |
| 1930 | 1,107 | | 13.0% |
| 1940 | 1,482 | | 33.9% |
| 1950 | 1,867 | | 26.0% |
| 1960 | 2,603 | | 39.4% |
| 1970 | 2,918 | | 12.1% |
| 1980 | 2,862 | | −1.9% |
| 1990 | 2,490 | | −13.0% |
| 2000 | 2,314 | | −7.1% |
| 2010 | 2,640 | | 14.1% |
| 2020 | 2,479 | | −6.1% |
| 2024 (est.) | 2,394 | | −3.4% |

As of the 2000 census, there were 2,314 people, 886 households, and 658 families residing in the township. The population density was 1,115.8 inhabitants per square mile (430.8/km^{2}). There were 920 housing units at an average density of 443.6 per square mile (171.3/km^{2}). The racial makeup of the township was 97.23% White, 1.25% African American, 0.30% Native American, 0.91% Asian, 0.04% Pacific Islander, and 0.26% from two or more races. Hispanic or Latino of any race were 0.78% of the population.

There were 886 households, out of which 32.6% had children under the age of 18 living with them, 61.7% were married couples living together, 9.7% had a female householder with no husband present, and 25.7% were non-families. 21.2% of all households were made up of individuals, and 9.5% had someone living alone who was 65 years of age or older. The average household size was 2.60 and the average family size was 3.05.

In the township the population was spread out, with 23.9% under the age of 18, 6.7% from 18 to 24, 31.0% from 25 to 44, 23.4% from 45 to 64, and 14.9% who were 65 years of age or older. The median age was 38 years. For every 100 females, there were 93.6 males. For every 100 females age 18 and over, there were 93.2 males.

The median income for a household in the township was $49,500, and the median income for a family was $52,267. Males had a median income of $35,661 versus $25,076 for females. The per capita income for the township was $19,472. About 3.2% of families and 5.1% of the population were below the poverty line, including 6.4% of those under age 18 and 5.6% of those age 65 or over.

== In popular culture ==
Some scenes in the movie The Silence of the Lambs were filmed in the Glenwillard neighborhood of Crescent Township. A house on Front Street was used as the Bimmel house, home of one of Buffalo Bill's victims. The CSX Transportation (formerly Pittsburgh and Lake Erie Railroad) tracks that traverse the township are clearly visible in the establishing shots.

== Notable people ==
- Lou Christie (born 1943), famous singer/songwriter, grew up in the Glenwillard section of Crescent and attended Moon High School.
- NCAA men's basketball coach John Calipari (born 1959) lived in Crescent when he was an assistant coach at the University of Pittsburgh under Paul Evans.
