= Daniel Chamovitz =

American-born Israeli biologist

- דניאל חיימוביץ
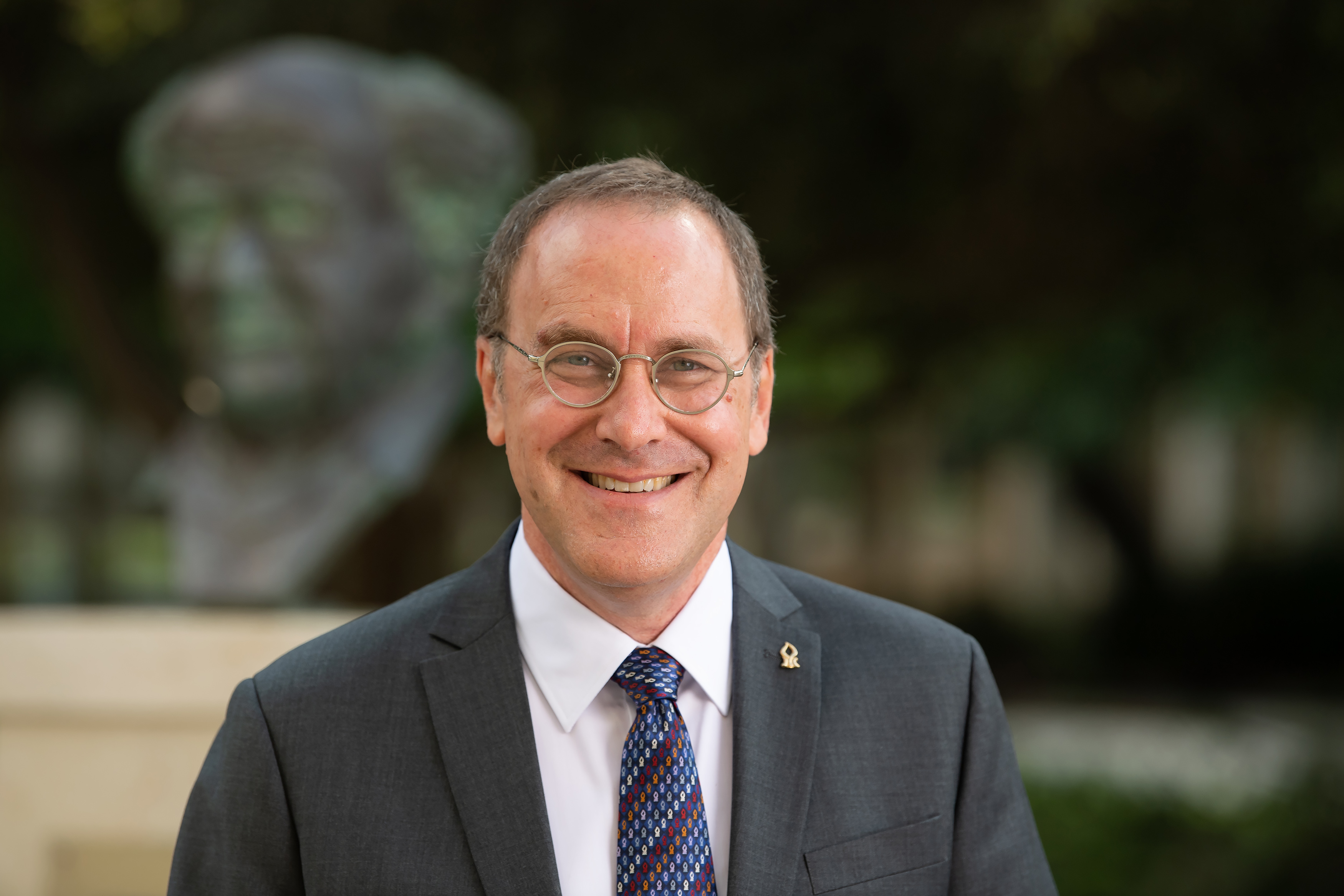
- Chamovitz, the 7th President of Ben-Gurion University of the Negev
- Born: April 18, 1963 (age 63); Pittsburgh, Pennsylvania, US
- Citizenship: Israel, United States
- Education: Yale University (1993-1995, Postdoc); Hebrew University of Jerusalem (1993, PhD, Genetics); Hebrew University of Jerusalem (1986, B.Sc., Biology,); Hopewell High School (Pennsylvania), Aliquippa, PA (1981)
- Known for: Carotenoid biosynthesis Discovering the COP9 signalosome What a Plant Knows (2012)
- Spouse: Shira Yalon-Chamovitz
- Scientific career
- Fields: Plant Biology; Molecular genetics Food security
- Workplaces: Ben Gurion University of the Negev; Tel Aviv University
- Thesis: Molecular Analysis of the Early Steps of Carotenoid Biosynthesis in Cyanobacteria: Phytoene Synthase and Phytoene Desaturase
- Doctoral advisor: Joseph Hirschberg

Daniel Chamovitz (Hebrew: דניאל חיימוביץ; born April 18, 1963) is an American-born Israeli plant geneticist and the 7th President of Ben-Gurion University of the Negev in Beer-Sheva, Israel. On July 1, 2024, he assumed the position of head of VERA – Association of University Heads, Israel. Previously he was Dean of the George S. Wise Faculty of Life Sciences at Tel Aviv University, Israel, and the founding director of the multidisciplinary Manna Center Program in Food Safety and Security.

== Biography ==
Daniel Chamovitz was born in Pittsburgh, Pennsylvania, and grew up in Aliquippa, Pennsylvania. He began his undergraduate studies at Columbia University in New York City, NY, and then transferred to the Hebrew University of Jerusalem, where he studied plant science. He received his Ph.D. in Genetics in 1992. From 1993 to 1996 he carried out postdoctoral research at Yale University, before accepting a faculty position at Tel Aviv University. In 2002, Chamovitz was a visiting scientist at the Fred Hutchinson Cancer Research Center in Seattle, and he has also been a visiting professor at the School of Advanced Agricultural Sciences at Peking University. He founded the interdisciplinary Manna Center Program in Food Safety and Security at Tel Aviv University in 2013, and was Dean of the George S. Wise Faculty of Life Sciences at Tel Aviv University from 2014 to 2018.

Since January 1, 2019, Chamovitz serves as the 7th President of Ben-Gurion University of the Negev in Beer-Sheva, Israel, and holds the university's Miles and Lillian Cahn Chair in Food Security and Plant Science.

== Scientific career ==
During his doctoral research, in the lab of Joseph Hirschberg, Daniel Chamovitz cloned several genes involved in the biosynthesis of beta-carotene. As a postdoctoral fellow in the lab of Xing-Wang Deng at Yale University, he discovered the COP9 Signalosome (CSN) complex. At Tel Aviv University he continued to work on this protein complex to understand its role in regulating plant responses to the environment with both Arabidopsis and Drosophila as model systems. Using genetic, biochemical, molecular and computational approaches, he has shown that CSN is essential for development in both plants and animals and is likely also involved in a number of human diseases, including cancer. His lab has also elucidated the role of the phytochemical indole-3-carbinol in plant development. Chamovitz has published over 70 scientific papers in peer-reviewed journals with over 8,000 citations listed in Google Scholar. He was also member of the Faculty of 1000, Biology.

He is known for his popular science book What a Plant Knows, which was first published in 2012, with an updated and revised edition appearing in 2017. The book won a silver medal from the Nautilus Book Awards and was listed as one of the Top 10 Science books in Amazon for 2012. What a Plant Knows has been translated and published in 20 countries. The book was also the base for a course with the same name taught on Coursera by Chamovitz to over 100,000 students, beginning in 2013.

== Selected awards ==
- 1993 European Molecular Biology Organization Long-term fellowship
- 1994 Human Frontier Science Program Postdoctoral fellowship
- 1996 Alon Fellowship מלגת אלון for the Integration of Outstanding Faculty, by the Israel Council for Higher Education
- 2002 Union for International Cancer Control ICC-American Cancer Society Beginning Investigator Award
- 2013 Nautilus Book Awards silver medal
- 2021 Bonei Zion Prize in the field of education
- 2023 Named among the 50 Influential Jews for 2022-23 by The Jerusalem Post
- 2024 Named among the 48 of 2024 by ISRAEL21c
- 2024 Named among the 50 Influential Jews for 2023-24 by The Jerusalem Post
