= Hopewell High School (Pennsylvania) =

Coordinates: 40.588°N 80.253°W

- Hopewell Vikings athletic logo

Location
- 1215 Longvue Ave; Aliquippa, Beaver County, Pennsylvania 15001; United States

Information
- School type: Secondary
- School district: Hopewell Area School District
- Principal: Dr. Robert Kartychak
- Staff: 44.91 (FTE)
- Enrollment: 625 (2023-2024)
- Student to teacher ratio: 13.92
- Colors: Blue and gold
- Mascot: Viking
- Feeder schools: Hopewell Memorial Junior High School
- Information: 724-375-6691
- Website: Hopewell High School

Hopewell High School is a public high school in Hopewell Township, Pennsylvania, United States. It is the only high school in the Hopewell Area School District. Athletic teams compete as the Hopewell Vikings in the Western Pennsylvania Interscholastic Athletic League.

== Extracurriculars ==
Hopewell High School offers a wide variety of clubs, activities and sports.

=== Sports ===
Viking teams have held the following Pennsylvania Interscholastic Athletic Association championships: baseball, 1986, 2021; football, 2002; girls volleyball, 2004; girls basketball, 2006, 2007. Hopewell's girls volleyball team is a four-time defending champion in the Western Pennsylvania Interscholastic Athletic League.

== Notable alumni ==
- Daniel Chamovitz, noted biologist and author of What a Plant Knows, President of Ben Gurion University of the Negev
- Tony Dorsett, second overall pick in the 1977 NFL draft, former Heisman Trophy winner at Pittsburgh, Pro Football Hall of Fame and College Football Hall of Fame, former NFL Player for the Dallas Cowboys and Denver Broncos.
- April Goss, former placekicker for the Kent State Golden Flashes football team, became the second female player to score in an official Football Bowl Subdivision game.
- Nate Guenin, played for 5 NHL teams in his career.
- Christa Harmotto, Penn State volleyball player, 2007 Big Ten Player of the Year, led team to 2007 NCAA volleyball championship, also broke Hopewell High School's record for hitting percentage and blocks.
- Connie Izay, nurse, actress, technical advisor on medical television programs
- Bill Koman, former NFL linebacker for the Baltimore Colts, Philadelphia Eagles and St. Louis Cardinals.
- Doc Medich, former professional baseball player who pitched in the Major Leagues from 1972 to 1982 for five different teams.
- Paul Posluszny, former NFL linebacker, two time Bednarik Award winner, and 2005 Butkus Award winner.
- Dan Rains, former player of the Chicago Bears.
- Joe Rock, pitcher in the Chicago White Sox organization.
- Joe Verbanic, former Major League Baseball pitcher for Philadelphia Phillies and New York Yankees.
- Rushel Shell, WPIAL career rushing yardage leader.
- Shatori Walker-Kimbrough (born 1995), basketball player for the Israeli team Maccabi Bnot Ashdod, and the Washington Mystics of the Women's National Basketball Association
