= Paul Posluszny =

American football player (born 1984)

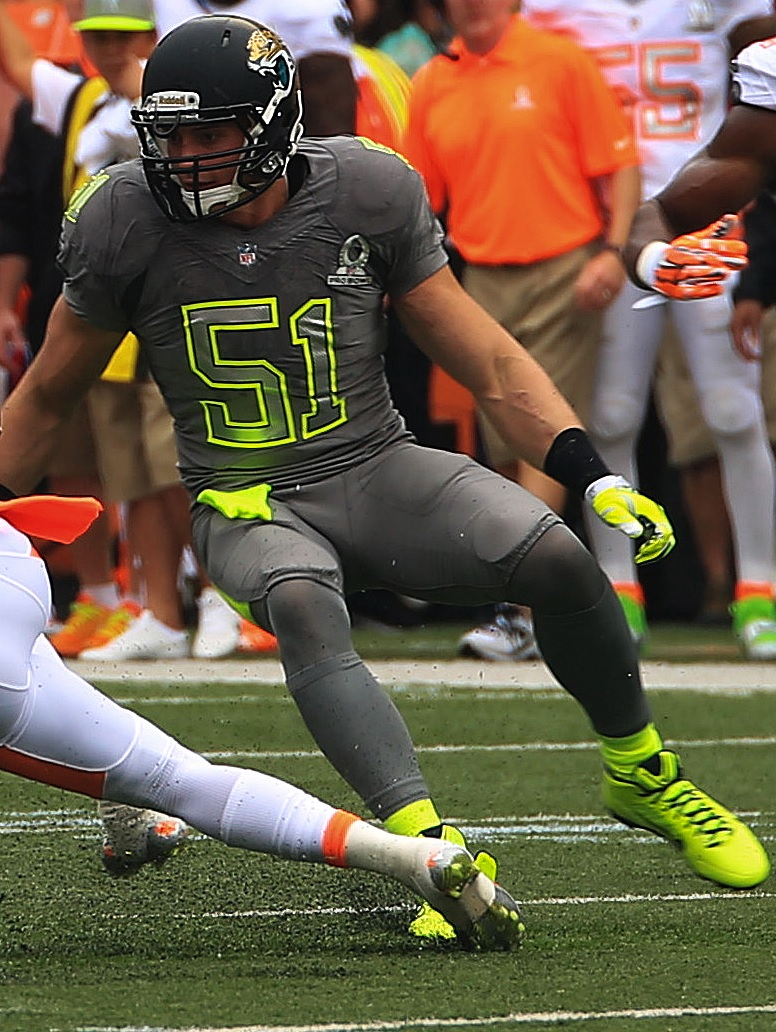
- Posluszny during the 2014 Pro Bowl

No. 51
- Position: Linebacker

Personal information
- Born: October 10, 1984 (age 42); Butler, Pennsylvania, U.S.
- Listed height: 6 ft 2 in (1.88 m)
- Listed weight: 232 lb (105 kg)

Career information
- High school: Hopewell (Hopewell Township, Pennsylvania)
- College: Penn State (2003–2006)
- NFL draft: 2007: 2nd round, 34th overall pick

Career history
- Buffalo Bills (2007–2010); Jacksonville Jaguars (2011–2017)

Awards and highlights
- Pro Bowl (2013); NFL solo tackles leader (2013); 2× Chuck Bednarik Award (2005, 2006); Dick Butkus Award (2005); 2× Consensus All-American (2005, 2006); 2× First-team All-Big Ten (2005, 2006); Second-team All-Big Ten (2004)

Career NFL statistics
- Total tackles: 1,214
- Sacks: 16.0
- Interceptions: 15
- Pass deflections: 51
- Forced fumbles: 8
- Defensive touchdowns: 1
- Stats at Pro Football Reference
- College Football Hall of Fame

Paul Michael Posluszny (/pəzˈlʌzni/; born October 10, 1984) is an American former professional football player who was a linebacker for eleven seasons in the National Football League (NFL), primarily with the Jacksonville Jaguars. He played college football for the Penn State Nittany Lions, winning the Chuck Bednarik Award twice and the Dick Butkus Award once. He was selected by the Buffalo Bills in the second round of the 2007 NFL draft. Following four years in Buffalo, Posluszny spent the remainder of his career with the Jaguars. Posluszny earned Pro Bowl honors during the 2013 season after leading the league in solo tackles. He was inducted into the College Football Hall of Fame in 2024.

== Early life ==
Posluszny was born in Butler, Pennsylvania on October 10, 1984. He is of Polish descent (his surname in Polish means 'obedient'). He was a star halfback and linebacker at Hopewell High School in Hopewell Township, Beaver County, Pennsylvania. In 2002, his senior year, he helped lead the Vikings to the WPIAL championship with an 8–1 record, followed by the AAA State Championship.

== College career ==
Posluszny played football at Penn State University from 2003 to 2006. He debuted in the fifth game of his 2003 freshman season, and in the last game of the season made his first career start at Michigan State. During the season, he recorded 36 tackles, an interception (which he returned for a touchdown against Indiana), a fumble recovery, and was named to the Big Ten All-Freshman team by The Sporting News.

In 2004, he was named as a second-team All-Big Ten player as well as earning academic All-Big Ten honors. Prior to that season he changed to jersey No. 31, in honor of former Penn State players who had worn the number including All-Americans Shane Conlan and Andre Collins. He started in all 11 games and led his team with 104 tackles, and his 9.5 tackles per game average put him in a tie for fifth in the Big Ten. He also recorded 12 tackles for loss and three sacks, helping Penn State reach the national top 10 in scoring and total defense. In fact, the defense did not allow an opponent to reach over 21 points in a game all season. He also caught an interception, broke up three passes and forced a fumble on the season. He won the Big Ten Defensive Player-of-the-Week for his performance against Indiana, making 13 tackles and playing a key role in Penn State's goal-line stand to ensure the win.

In 2005, Posluszny became the first junior captain for Penn State since Mike Reid and Steve Smear in 1968. He posted 116 tackles on the season, 14 for loss, and 4 sacks, including a 22-tackle game against Northwestern. He was named Big Ten Defensive Player-of-the-Week a record-breaking three consecutive times. He then joined LaVar Arrington as the second Penn State player to win both the Chuck Bednarik and Dick Butkus Awards as the College Defensive Player and Linebacker of the Year respectively, and was named as a member of the 2005 All-America Team. He helped lead the Penn State Nittany Lions to a win in the 2006 Orange Bowl against Florida State but left the game in the fourth quarter after partially tearing two ligaments in his knee; the injury did not require surgery. He subsequently announced that he planned to return to Penn State for his senior year of college, rather than declare himself eligible for the 2006 NFL draft, a decision which, a year later, was considered "a boon," with Posluszny completing the 2006 season with 116 tackles and a school-high career total 372 tackles.

In 2006, he continued captaincy, along with Levi Brown. Jack Ham, former All-American Linebacker at Penn State, said that Posluszny was the greatest linebacker to ever play at Penn State. On November 4, 2006, he broke Greg Buttle's school record for tackles. Posluszny had 372 career tackles, with 116 of them coming during that season, including 9.5 tackles for loss, three sacks, and two forced fumbles. (The Penn State tackle record was surpassed shortly after by fellow linebacker Dan Connor.) Posluszny won the 2006 Chuck Bednarik Award to become only the second person (after Pat Fitzgerald) to win the award two times. Posluszny was also named a member of the 2006 All-America Team, the first Penn State linebacker to be a two-time Associated Press All-American.

Posluszny graduated a semester early in December 2006 with a Bachelor of Science in finance and a 3.57 GPA. He is a two-time ESPN The Magazine Academic All-American and was named 2006 Academic All-American of the Year. He was also a finalist for the Draddy Trophy, which is presented to the nations' top student-athlete.

Posluszny was inducted into the College Football Hall of Fame in 2024.

== Professional career ==
=== Pre-draft ===
Posluszny was graded high at the NFL Combine.

Pre-draft measurables
Height	Weight	Arm length	Hand span	40-yard dash	10-yard split	20-yard split	20-yard shuttle	Three-cone drill	Vertical jump	Broad jump	Bench press
6 ft 1 5/8 in (1.87 m)	238 lb (108 kg)	33 3/4 in (0.86 m)	9 1/2 in (0.24 m)	4.58 s	1.53 s	2.61 s	4.20 s	6.94 s	37 in (0.94 m)	9 ft 8 in (2.95 m)	22 reps
All values from NFL Combine/Pro Day

=== Buffalo Bills ===
==== 2007 ====
The Buffalo Bills selected Posluszny in the second round with the 34th overall pick in the 2007 NFL draft. The Bills traded their second (43rd overall) and third round (74th overall) picks to move up nine spots and select Posluszny. The Lions went on to select Drew Stanton with their second-round pick (43rd overall) and traded their third-round pick (74th overall) to the Baltimore Ravens. He was the fourth linebacker selected in 2007, after future Pro bowlers Patrick Willis, Lawrence Timmons, and Jon Beason.

On July 26, 2007, the Bills signed Posluszny to a four-year, $4.75 million contract that includes $2.55 million guaranteed.

Throughout training camp, Posluszny competed against veteran John DiGiorgio for the job as the starting middle linebacker after it was left vacant by the departure of London Fletcher. Head coach Dick Jauron named Posluszny the starting middle linebacker to start the regular season.

He made his professional regular season debut and first career start in the Bills' season-opener against the Denver Broncos and recorded ten combined tackles (nine solo) in their 15–14 loss. The following week, he recorded a season-high 12 combined tackles (five solo) during a 26–3 loss at the Pittsburgh Steelers. On September 23, 2007, Posluszny made four combined tackles before leaving in the third quarter after suffering a broken left forearm in their 38–7 loss at the New England Patriots. He was placed on injured reserve, ending his rookie season. At the time of his injury, he was third in the league with 26 combined tackles, which was tied for the most tackles among rookies with Patrick Willis. He finished his rookie season with 26 combined tackles (17 solo) in three starts and three games.

==== 2008 ====
Posluszny returned as the starting middle linebacker in 2008, along with outside linebackers Angelo Crowell and Kawika Mitchell. On December 7, 2008, Posluszny recorded a season-high 11 combined tackles (eight solo) in the Bills' 16–3 loss to the Miami Dolphins. The following week, Posluszny recorded five combined tackles, two pass break ups, and made his first career interception off of quarterback Brett Favre during the Bills' 31–27 loss at the New York Jets. Posluszny finished the 2008 season with 110 combined tackles (87 solo), six pass deflections, a fumble recovery, and an interception in 16 games and 16 starts. He was named the Bills' Defensive MVP.

==== 2009 ====
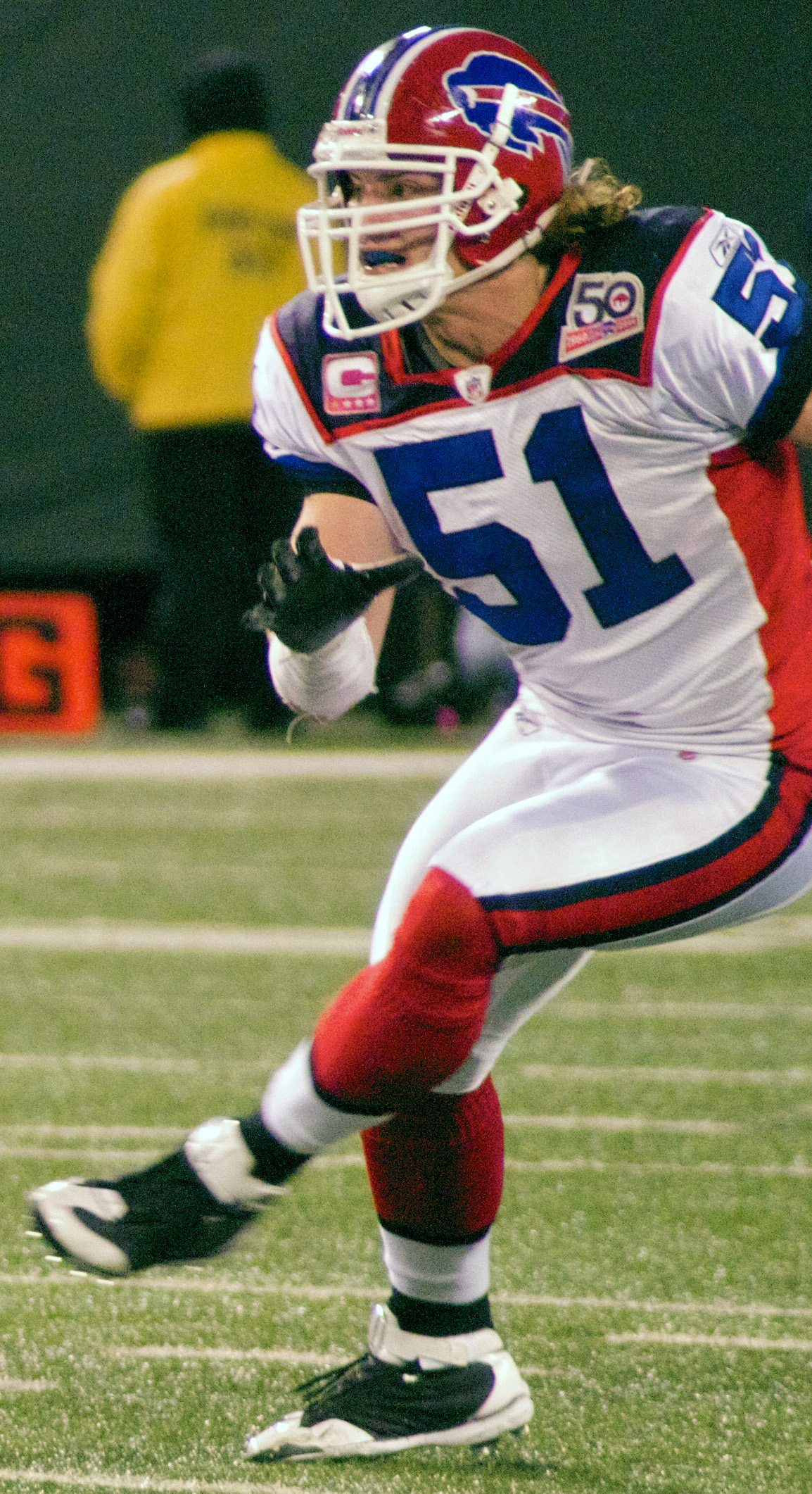
Posluszny in 2009

Head coach Dick Jauron named Posluszny the starting middle linebacker along with outside linebackers Kawika Mitchell and Keith Ellison to begin the regular season. Posluszny was one of six team captains selected prior to the start of the 2009 season.

He started the Bills' season-opener against the New England Patriots and recorded six solo tackles before leaving the 25–24 Monday Night Football loss in the first quarter after breaking a bone in his left forearm. The injury was expected to sideline him for at least six weeks, but Posluszny was able to recover quickly and returned in four weeks while missing only four games (Weeks 2–5). He returned in Week 6 and recorded nine combined tackles, one pass deflection, and an interception during a 16–13 victory at the New York Jets. On November 15, 2009, Posluszny recorded a season-high 12 combined tackles (ten solo) in their 41–17 loss at the Tennessee Titans. Head coach Dick Jauron was fired two days later after the Bills started the season with a 3–6 record. Defensive coordinator Perry Fewell was elevated to interim head coach for the remainder of the season. The next week, Posluszny collected a season-high tying 12 combined tackles (11 solo) in the Bills' 18–15 loss at the Jacksonville Jaguars. In Week 13, he recorded five solo tackles and made his first career sack on quarterback Mark Sanchez in the Bills' 16–13 loss to the New York Jets. On December 20, 2009, Posluszny made nine combined tackles and intercepted Tom Brady for his third pick of the season as the Bills lost to the New England Patriots 17–10. He finished his third season with 111 combined tackles (88 solo), four pass deflections, three interceptions, and one sack in 12 games and 12 starts. The Bills finished the 2009 season fourth in the AFC East and did not qualify for the playoffs for the third consecutive season after finishing with a 6–10 record.

==== 2010 ====
On January 20, 2010, the Bills announced that they hired former Dallas Cowboys' head coach Chan Gailey as their new head coach. Defensive coordinator George Edwards decided not to continue to use a base 4-3 defense and installed a 3-4 defense that relied heavily on the linebacking core and used two inside linebackers instead of a sole middle linebacker. Throughout training camp, Posluszny competed to be a starting inside linebacker against Kawika Mitchell and Andra Davis. Head coach Chan Gailey named Posluszny and Andra Davis the starting inside linebackers, along with outside linebackers Chris Kelsay and Aaron Maybin.

He started the Bills' season-opener against the Miami Dolphins and recorded eight combined tackles and a sack as the Bills lost 15–10. He left the game during the third quarter after sustaining an apparent knee injury while tackling running back Ronnie Brown with two teammates. The following day, it was revealed that Posluszny had suffered a sprained MCL and was expected to be sidelined for only two weeks (Weeks 2–3). On October 31, 2010, Posluszny recorded a season-high 17 combined tackles (11 solo) and broke up a pass during a 13–10 loss at the Kansas City Chiefs. In Week 13, he collected 15 combined tackles (11 solo) and sacked quarterback Tarvaris Jackson as the Bills were routed by the Minnesota Vikings 38–14. Throughout the season, Posluszny had ten games with at least ten combined tackles. He finished his final season in Buffalo with 151 combined tackles (103 solo), four pass deflections, and two sacks in 14 games and 14 starts.

On March 1, 2011, the Bills assigned a one-year free agent tender to Posluszny. The tender became null and void, making Posluszny an unrestricted free agent after the signing of the NFL Collective Bargaining Agreement by the NFLPA that ended a four-month lockout. General manager Buddy Nix and Posluszny showed mutual interest on an extension, with Posluszny saying his first intention is to consider re-signing. After his departure, Posluszny stated he felt he was not in their plans and not a fit for the team once Nix stated the Bills' desire to have him around 245–250 lbs.

=== Jacksonville Jaguars ===
==== 2011 ====
On July 29, 2011, the Jacksonville Jaguars signed Posluszny to a six-year, $45 million contract that includes $13 million guaranteed and a signing bonus of $10 million.

He entered training camp slated as the starting middle linebacker in defensive coordinator Mel Tucker's base 4–3 defense after the role was left vacant by Kirk Morrison who coincidentally departed for the Buffalo Bills. Head coach Jack Del Rio officially named him the starter along with outside linebackers Daryl Smith and Clint Session.

He made his Jaguars regular season debut in the Jaguars' season-opener against the Tennessee Titans and made four combined tackles and a pass deflection in a 16–14 victory. On October 16, 2011, Posluszny recorded a season-high 16 combined tackles (nine solo) in the Jaguars' 17–13 loss at the Pittsburgh Steelers. In Week 10, he made six combined tackles, a pass deflection, assisted on a sack, and intercepted a pass by Curtis Painter in a 17–3 win at the Indianapolis Colts. On November 29, 2012, the Jaguars fired head coach Jack Del Rio and defensive coordinator Mel Tucker was promoted to interim head coach for the rest of the season. Posluszny finished the 2011 season with 119 combined tackles (69 solo), a career-high nine pass deflections, two sacks, and two interceptions in 16 games and 16 starts.

==== 2012 ====
On January 11, 2012, the Jaguars hired Atlanta Falcons' offensive coordinator Mike Mularkey. Mularkey opted to retain defensive coordinator Mel Tucker with Posluszny, Smith, and Session remaining as the starting linebacker core.

On November 15, 2012, Posluszny recorded 15 combined tackles (nine solo), a pass deflection and intercepted a pass by Matt Schaub during the Jaguars' 43–37 loss at the Houston Texans. In Week 17, he made ten combined tackles and sacked quarterback Jake Locker twice as the Jaguars lost 38–20 at the Tennessee Titans. This marked his first career multi-sack game. He set a single-season franchise record with 139 combined tackles (106 solo), seven pass deflections, three interceptions, and two sacks in 16 games and 16 starts.

==== 2013 ====
On January 10, 2013, the Jaguars fired head coach Mike Mularkey after a single season where the Jaguars finished 2–14. On January 17, 2013, general manager Dave Caldwell announced Seattle Seahawks' defensive coordinator Gus Bradley as the Jaguars' new head coach. Defensive coordinator Bob Babich retained the 4–3 base defense and Posluszny remained the starting middle linebacker alongside outside linebackers Russell Allen and Geno Hayes.

On October 13, 2013, Posluszny recorded seven solo tackles, deflected a pass, and returned an interception off a pass by Peyton Manning for a 59-yard score to mark his first career touchdown in the Jaguars' 35–19 loss at the Denver Broncos. It was just the second interception thrown by Manning in his record-setting regular season. In Week 10, Posluszny made eight combined tackles in a 29–27 win at the Tennessee Titans. He left during the third quarter after suffering a concussion and was named AFC Defensive Player of the Week for his performance. The concussion sidelined him for the Jaguars' Week 11 loss to the Arizona Cardinals. The injury ended his streak of 54 consecutive starts. On January 20, 2014, Posluszny was named to his first Pro Bowl, replacing San Francisco 49ers linebacker Patrick Willis. He finished the 2013 season with a career-high 162 combined tackles (122 solo), nine pass deflections, three sacks, two interceptions, and one touchdown in 15 games and 15 starts.

==== 2014 ====
He returned as the starting middle linebacker in 2014 with starting outside linebackers LaRoy Reynolds and Geno Hayes. He started the Jaguars' season-opener at the Philadelphia Eagles and recorded a season-high 11 solo tackles and an assisted tackle in their 34–17 loss. In Week 7, Posluszny tied his season-high of 12 combined tackles and sacked Brian Hoyer during the Jaguars' 24–6 win against the Cleveland Browns. He left the game in the third quarter after sustaining an injury that was later discovered to be a torn pectoral muscle. Posluszny was placed on injured reserve for the remainder of the season and led the team with 69 combined tackles at the time of his injury. He finished the season with 69 combined tackles (42 solo), two pass deflections, and one sack in seven games and seven starts.

==== 2015 ====
On April 16, 2015, the Jaguars and Posluszny agreed to restructure his contract to a three-year, $15 million contract extension with $3.95 million guaranteed.

Posluszny remained the starting middle linebacker, but was now playing alongside Telvin Smith and Dan Skuta to start the regular season. In Week 3, he collected a career-high 18 combined tackles (14 solo) as the Jaguars were routed by the New England Patriots 51–17. The following week, he made five combined tackles in a 16–13 loss at the Indianapolis Colts before leaving with an ankle injury. He missed Jacksonville's Week 5 loss at the Tampa Bay Buccaneers due to the high ankle sprain. On December 6, 2015, Posluszny made 13 combined tackles during a 42–39 loss at the Tennessee Titans. He left the game in the fourth quarter after suffering a broken right hand. He missed the Jaguars' Week 14 victory against the Indianapolis Colts. On December 20, 2015, Posluszny collected ten combined tackles, deflected a pass, and intercepted a pass by Matt Ryan during a 23–17 loss to the Atlanta Falcons. He finished the 2015 season with 133 combined tackles (103 solo), six pass deflections, three interceptions, and a sack in 14 games and 14 starts.

==== 2016 ====
On January 5, 2016, defensive coordinator Bob Babich was fired after the Jaguars defense finished 31st in points allowed per game and 24th the previous season. On January 22, 2016, the Jaguars' announced that defensive line coach Todd Wash would be promoted to defensive coordinator. During organized team activities and the start of training camp, Posluszny competed for the job as the starting middle linebacker against rookie Myles Jack. Head coach Gus Bradley named Posluszny the starting middle linebacker along with starting outside linebackers Dan Skuta and Telvin Smith to begin the regular season.

On September 25, 2016, Posluszny recorded a season-high 12 combined tackles, deflected a pass, and intercepted a pass attempt by quarterback Joe Flacco in the Jaguars' 19–17 loss to the Baltimore Ravens. The following game, he made seven combined tackles and 1.5 sacks on Andrew Luck during a 30–27 victory against the Indianapolis Colts at Wembley Stadium. In Week 6, he tied his season-high of 10 solo tackles as the Jaguars earned a 17–16 victory at the Chicago Bears. On December 18, 2016, the Jaguars fired head coach Gus Bradley after they lost at the Houston Texans and had a 2–12 record. Assistant head coach/offensive line coach Doug Marrone was promoted to interim head coach for the remainder of the season. Posluszny finished the 2016 season with 133 combined tackles (97 solo), a career-high 14 quarterback hurries, three pass deflections, 1.5 sacks, and an interception in 16 games and 16 starts.

==== 2017 ====
On January 9, 2017, the Jaguars chose interim head coach Doug Marrone to be the full-time head coach entering the 2017 season. Marrone retained Todd Wash as the Jaguars defensive coordinator and hired Perry Fewell as defensive backs coach who was Posluszny's former defensive coordinator with the Buffalo Bills. On April 18, 2017, it was announced by the Jaguars' coaching staff that Myles Jack would enter organized team activities as the starting middle linebacker and Paul Posluszny would take over the starting strongside linebacker role previously held by Jack and the recently departed Dan Skuta. Posluszny returned to his middle linebacker position after Jack reverted to his strongside linebacker position due to his inability to adjust to his new role and his difficulty performing the required duties during the Jaguars' first preseason game against the New England Patriots.

In Week 13, Posluszny recorded a season-high 14 combined tackles and made 1.5 sacks on quarterback Jacoby Brissett as the Jaguars defeated the Indianapolis Colts 30–10. He finished the 2017 season with 61 combined tackles (42 solo), two pass deflections, and 1.5 sacks in 16 games and 11 starts.

The Jaguars finished first in the AFC South with a 10–6 record and received a playoff berth. This was the first time in Posluszny's career his team had a winning record and made the playoffs. On January 7, 2018, Posluszny started his first career playoff game, but was held without a tackle as the Jaguars defeated the Buffalo Bills in the AFC Wild Card Round. The following week, Posluszny made three combined tackles and a pass deflection in a 45–42 victory against his home state Pittsburgh Steelers in the Divisional Round. The Jaguars were eliminated by the New England Patriots in the following game with Posluszny collecting three solo tackles in the Jaguars' 24–20 AFC Championship loss.

On March 13, 2018, Posluszny announced his retirement from the NFL.

== NFL career statistics ==
Legend
**Bold**	Career high

=== Regular season ===
Year	Team	Games		Tackles				Fumbles				Interceptions					
Year	Team	GP	GS	Cmb	Solo	Ast	Sck	FF	FR	Yds	TD	Int	Yds	Avg	Lng	TD	PD
2007	BUF	3	3	26	17	9	0.0	0	0	0	0	0	0	0	0	0	0
2008	BUF	16	16	110	87	23	0.0	1	**1**	0	0	1	9	9	9	0	6
2009	BUF	12	12	111	88	23	1.0	**3**	0	0	0	**3**	20	6.7	17	0	4
2010	BUF	14	14	151	103	48	2.0	0	0	0	0	0	0	0	0	0	4
2011	JAX	16	16	119	69	**50**	2.0	1	0	0	0	2	2	1	2	0	**9**
2012	JAX	16	16	139	106	33	2.0	2	0	0	0	**3**	20	6.7	13	0	7
2013	JAX	15	15	**162**	**122**	40	**3.0**	1	**1**	0	0	2	**69**	**34.5**	**59T**	**1**	**9**
2014	JAX	7	7	69	47	22	2.0	0	**1**	**10**	0	0	0	0	0	0	1
2015	JAX	14	14	133	103	30	1.0	0	0	0	0	**3**	25	8.3	19	0	6
2016	JAX	16	16	133	97	36	1.5	0	0	0	0	1	0	0	0	0	3
2017	JAX	16	11	61	43	18	1.5	0	0	0	0	0	0	0	0	0	2
Career		145	140	1,214	882	332	16.0	8	3	10	0	15	145	9.7	59T	1	51

=== Postseason ===
Year	Team	Games		Tackles				Fumbles				Interceptions					
Year	Team	GP	GS	Cmb	Solo	Ast	Sck	FF	FR	Yds	TD	Int	Yds	Avg	Lng	TD	PD
2017	JAX	3	3	6	5	1	0.0	0	0	0	0	0	0	0	0	0	1
Career		3	3	6	5	1	0.0	0	0	0	0	0	0	0	0	0	1

== Personal life ==
On July 6, 2013, Posluszny married fellow Penn State graduate Elizabeth Sarah Johnson in Pittsburgh, Pennsylvania, before the start of the 2013 regular season. They delayed their Bora Bora honeymoon until after the season ended, but postponed it again after Posluszny was voted to the Pro Bowl.

Despite wearing No. 31 like his idol Shane Conlan at Penn State, Posluszny chose No. 51 when joining the Bills as a rookie instead of No. 58, which was available and was the number Conlan wore with the Bills.
