= David Littell House =

Historic house in Pennsylvania, United States

- U.S. National Register of Historic Places
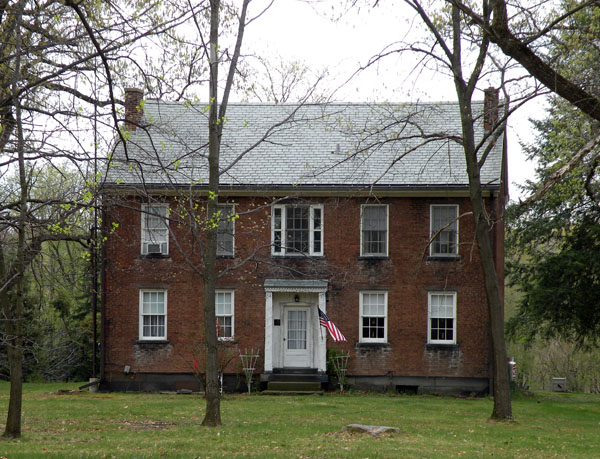
- Front of the house

- Location within Pennsylvania Location within the United States
- Location: Pennsylvania Route 18 in Hanover Township, Beaver County, Pennsylvania
- Nearest city: Hookstown, Pennsylvania
- Coordinates: 40°33′24.22″N 80°24′14.83″W
- Area: 23.5 acres (9.5 ha)
- Built: 1851
- Architect: Hayward & Cain
- Architectural style: Vernacular Greek Revival
- NRHP reference No.: 86002886
- Added to NRHP: October 31, 1986

The David Littell House is a historic house in Hanover Township in the southwestern part of Beaver County, Pennsylvania, United States. Built in 1851, the house is listed on the National Register of Historic Places.

== History ==
The Littell House was erected by the local builders Hayward and Cain on land owned by the Littell family for several generations. William Littell was among the area's first settlers, having received a warrant for the tract of land where the house was built after his service in the Revolutionary War. He was a prominent member of the local community, owning wide lands in the area and serving as a justice of the peace after 1795; he died in 1820. Littell donated some of his grant for the location of the Service Associate Presbyterian Church and Seminary, which joined the United Presbyterian Church of North America at its formation in 1858. After his death, his son David — a leading member of the Service church — inherited the land. Besides agriculture, the property was the location of a tannery, which was in business at the time of the house's construction, and which was profitable enough to make Littell a rich man. The Littell House remained in the Littell family after David's death, passing successively into the hands of his son, grandson, and great-granddaughter.

Because the names of its builders are known, the history of the David Littell House is better known than that of most rural period houses in its vicinity. In 1986, the David Littell House was listed on the National Register of Historic Places. It received this recognition due to its unique degree of preservation, as it was one of few nineteenth-century houses remaining in Hanover Township and the only one that had survived without major changes. The house was seen as a prime example of local history, as it remained a living example of early nineteenth-century industry and agriculture in the township.

== Architecture ==
A Greek Revival house located along Pennsylvania Route 18 near the small community of Mechanicsburg, the Littell House is a typical two-story brick farmhouse of its era. It features a symmetrical house plan with a central hallway and two rooms on each side of the house, each of which has a fireplace and two windows to the front or back of the house. Among its most unusual features is a hallway window on the second story, which includes details built in a way common in houses of the period but quite rare in Western Pennsylvanian farmhouses. The roof was originally flat or slightly sloped; it was replaced by the current gabled roof soon after the house was built. Although the house has been altered in other ways since its construction, these changes have been relatively insignificant — for example, replacing the shingled roof with slates and adding a new front door to protect the interior — and have generally had little or no effect on the house's historic integrity.

== Remainder of property ==
The Littell property includes four historically significant sites in addition to the house. Littell did not originally build a house at the current location: three previous house sites are located on the same property. Moreover, a group of three pits used for drying hides in the tannery is located near the southeastern corner of the property. Also located on the property are a barn, a garage, an outhouse, and two wooden sheds; as all were built or rebuilt in the twentieth century, they do not contribute to the house's significance in the way that the previous house sites and the tanning pits do.
