= Bill Koman =

American football player (1934–2019)

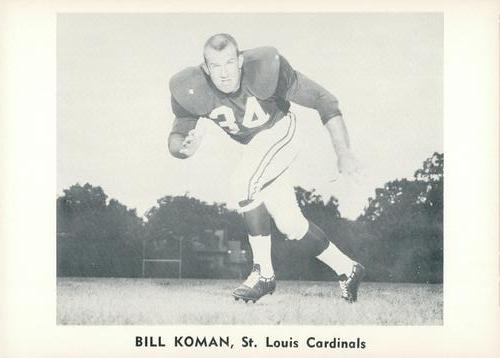
- Koman in 1961

No. 65, 68, 53, 34
- Position: Linebacker

Personal information
- Born: September 16, 1934; Ambridge, Pennsylvania, U.S.
- Died: November 1, 2019 (aged 85); St. Louis, Missouri, U.S.
- Listed height: 6 ft 2 in (1.88 m)
- Listed weight: 229 lb (104 kg)

Career information
- High school: Hopewell (Aliquippa, Pennsylvania)
- College: North Carolina
- NFL draft: 1956: 8th round, 91st overall pick

Career history
- Baltimore Colts (1956); Philadelphia Eagles (1957–1958); Chicago / St. Louis Cardinals (1959–1967)

Awards and highlights
- 2× Pro Bowl (1962, 1964)

Career NFL statistics
- Interceptions: 7
- Fumble recoveries: 21
- Sacks: 24.5
- Stats at Pro Football Reference

William John Koman (September 16, 1934 – November 1, 2019) was an American professional football player who was a linebacker in the National Football League (NFL) for the Baltimore Colts, Philadelphia Eagles, and the Chicago/St. Louis Cardinals.

== Education and early football career ==
Koman joined the football team at Hopewell High School as a junior. After graduating from high school, he played college football for the North Carolina Tar Heels, and subsequently earned his Bachelor's degree in economics there in 1956. He was selected in the eighth round of the 1956 NFL draft.

== Professional football career ==
Koman was a two-time Pro Bowl selection for the Cardinals in 1962 and 1964.

== Business career ==
Retired from football in 1968, Koman then went on to found The Koman Group in St. Louis, which oversaw the construction of residential and commercial properties across the city, and was one of the five original partners in the Casino Queen group of owners.

== Death ==
Koman died at the age of eighty-five at his home in St. Louis in 2019.
