= Raccoon Creek State Park =

State park in Beaver County, Pennsylvania

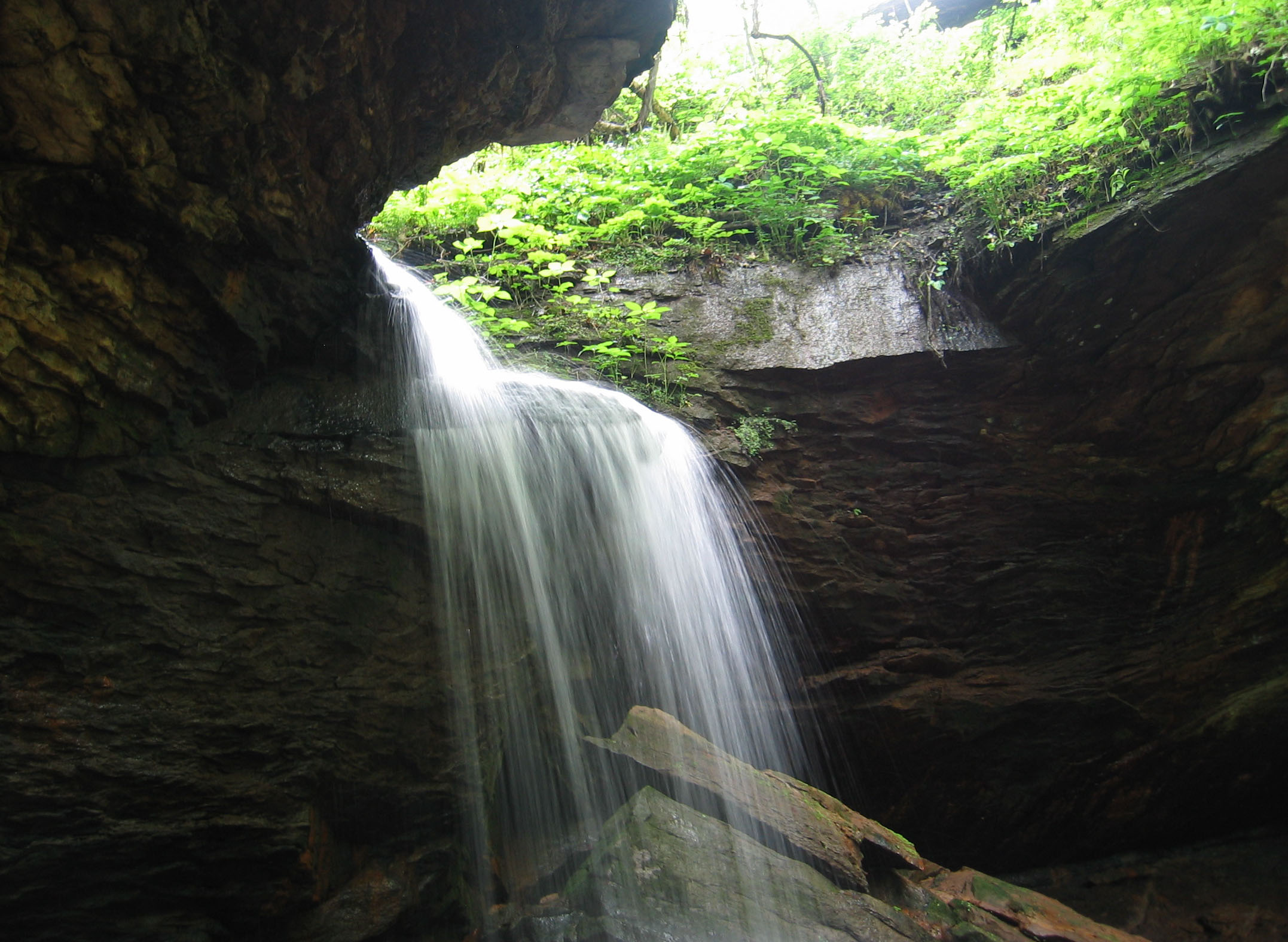

- Location within Pennsylvania Location within the United States
- Interactive map of Raccoon Creek State Park
- Location: Beaver County, Pennsylvania, United States
- Coordinates: 40°30′13″N 80°25′29″W
- Area: 7,572 acres (3,064 ha)
- Elevation: 932 feet (284 m)
- Established: 1945
- Administrator: Pennsylvania Department of Conservation and Natural Resources
- Website: Official website
- Pennsylvania State Parks
- Raccoon Creek RDA
- U.S. National Register of Historic Places
- U.S. Historic district
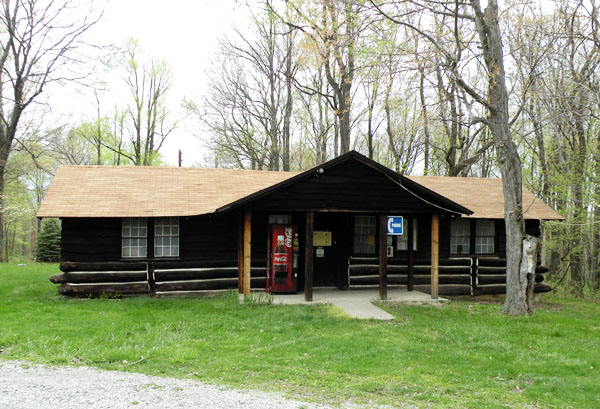
- One of the cabins in the RDA
- Location: Route 18 in Hanover Township
- Area: 812 acres (329 ha)
- Built: 1935
- Architect: CCC Camps SP-6 and SP-16
- Architectural style: National Park Service Rustic
- MPS: Emergency Conservation Work (ECW) Architecture in Pennsylvania State Parks: 1933-1942, TR
- NRHP reference No.: 87000745
- Added to NRHP: May 18, 1987

Raccoon Creek State Park is a 7,572-acre (3,064 ha) Pennsylvania state park on Raccoon Creek in Hanover and Independence townships in Beaver County, Pennsylvania in the United States. The park is about 30 miles (48 km) from the city of Pittsburgh, near Hookstown. Raccoon Creek State Park is easily accessed from Pennsylvania Route 18 and U.S Routes 30 and 22. The park offers numerous activities such as hiking, biking, cross-country skiing, camping, hunting, swimming, fishing, and boating, the last three at the 101-acre (41 ha) "Raccoon Lake."

Raccoon Creek State Park was chosen by the Pennsylvania Department of Conservation and Natural Resources (DCNR) and its Bureau of Parks as one of "25 Must-See Pennsylvania State Parks".

== History ==
=== Health resort ===
Raccoon Creek State Park is located on the site of a former Victorian era health resort. Frankfort Minerals Springs was the site of a natural mineral spring. It was founded by Edward McGinnis in the mid-19th century. He believed that the mineral spring waters held curative powers. McGinnis built his resort atop a hill in what is now Raccoon Creek State Park. Visitors to the resort walked down steps to the springs. The resort was very prosperous. At one time it featured a hotel, dance hall, livery stable and numerous guest cottages. Frankfort Mineral Springs closed during the first part of the 20th century.

=== Recreational Demonstration Area ===
Along with two other Pennsylvania state parks, Raccoon Creek State Park was established as a Recreational Demonstration Area during the Great Depression. Its earliest buildings, constructed by the Civilian Conservation Corps in 1935, are split among four areas: three group camps and a headquarters/maintenance complex. Built in the National Park Service Rustic style, these buildings were added to the National Register of Historic Places in 1987 as a historic district; a total of 114 buildings and structures qualified as contributing properties. The district was added to the Register for several significant reasons: besides their distinctive architecture and their role as parts of a recreational area, the buildings reflect the federal government's attempts to resolve the poverty of the Depression through political means.

=== Park ===
Raccoon Creek State Park has continued to develop from its beginning in the 1930s to one of the largest state parks in Pennsylvania. Facilities at the park are a mix from the early camp to modern facilities. In addition to recreational areas, there are large tracts of undeveloped land. Scenes for the film The Road were filmed at the park in the spring of 2008.

=== Wildflower Reserve ===
The 314-acre Wildflower Reserve, located at the eastern section of Raccoon Creek State Park, contains one of the most diverse stands of wildflowers in western Pennsylvania. Over 700 species of plants have been identified in the Reserve. Trails lead through a variety of habitats like oak-hickory forest, pine plantations, woodland meadows, and flood plain forest along Raccoon Creek. Wildflowers can be observed throughout the growing season with peak wildflower blooms occurring in late April and August. Because of its uniqueness and to preserve the many wildflower species, the Reserve is closed to all activities other than hiking on designated trails.

== Environment ==
Raccoon Creek State Park lies within the Appalachian mixed mesophytic forests ecoregion.

== Recreation ==
There are about 500 picnic tables spread among 5 picnic areas at Raccoon Creek State Park. Five pavilions are available to rent or if unrented are available on a first come, first served basis.

Raccoon Lake is open for year-round fishing. The common game fish are bullhead catfish, bluegill, yellow perch, crappie, walleye, muskellunge, and both large and smallmouth bass. Raccoon Lake's feeder streams are stocked with brook and rainbow trout by the Pennsylvania Fish and Boat Commission. These fish can also be found in the lake.

Hunting is permitted on over 5,000 acres (2,000 ha) of Raccoon Creek State Park. Hunters are expected to follow the rules and regulations of the Pennsylvania Game Commission. The common game species are ruffed grouse, squirrels, turkey, pheasants, white-tailed deer, and rabbits. The hunting of groundhogs is forbidden.

== Gallery ==
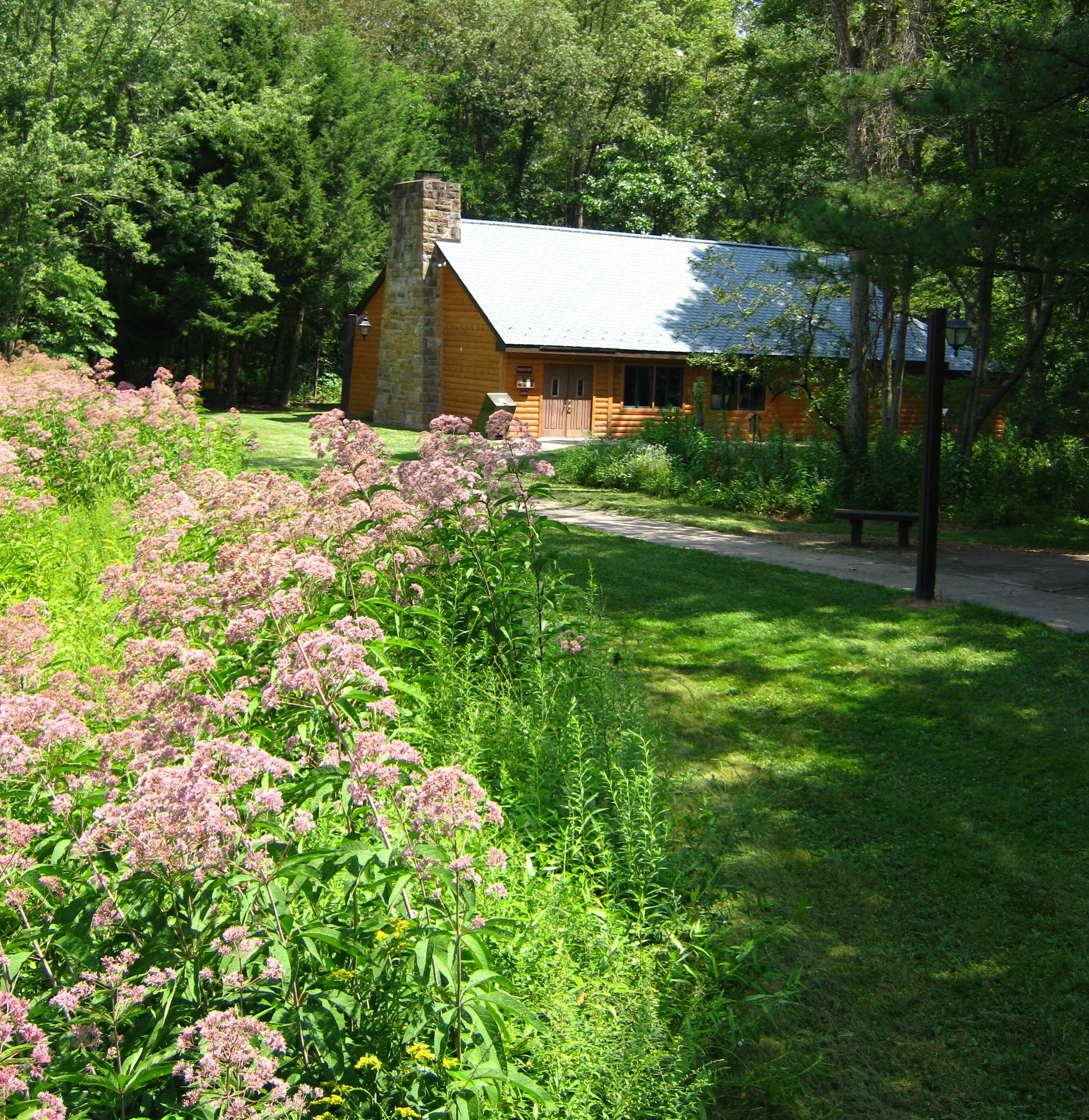
Wildflower Reserve.

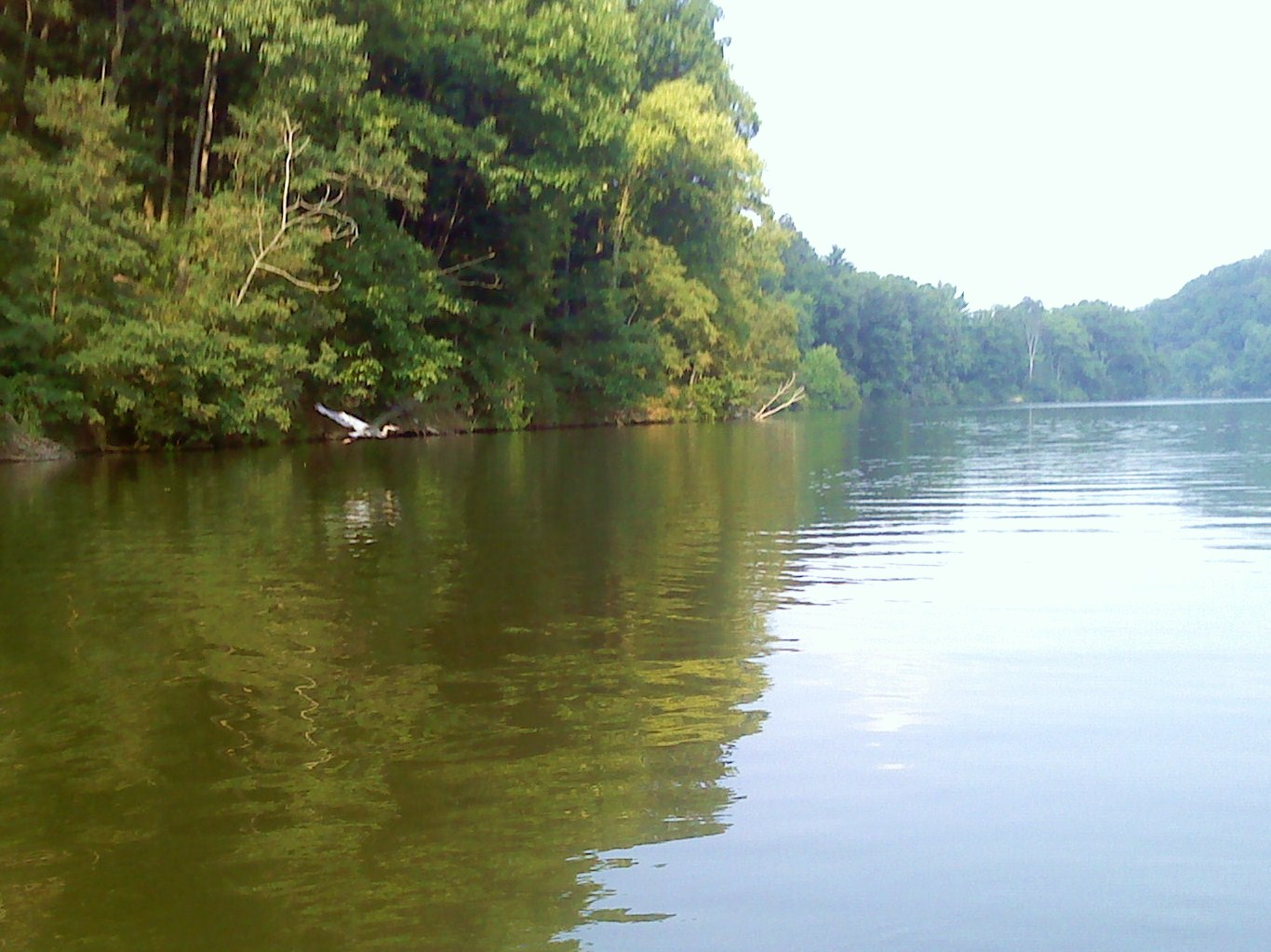
Raccoon Lake

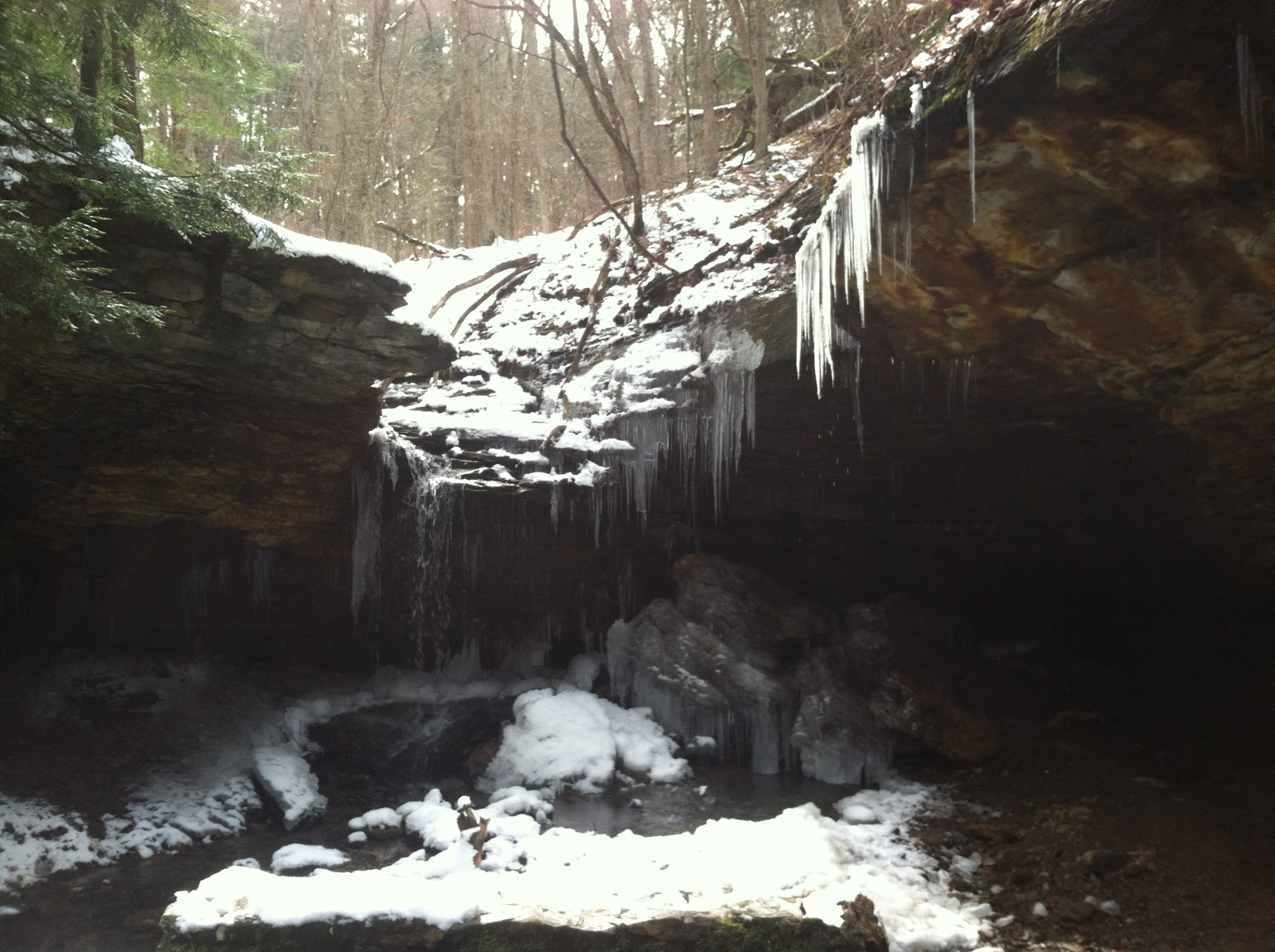
Raccoon Creek waterfall amphitheater frozen from a winter storm.
