= South Heights, Pennsylvania =

Borough in Pennsylvania, US

- Borough
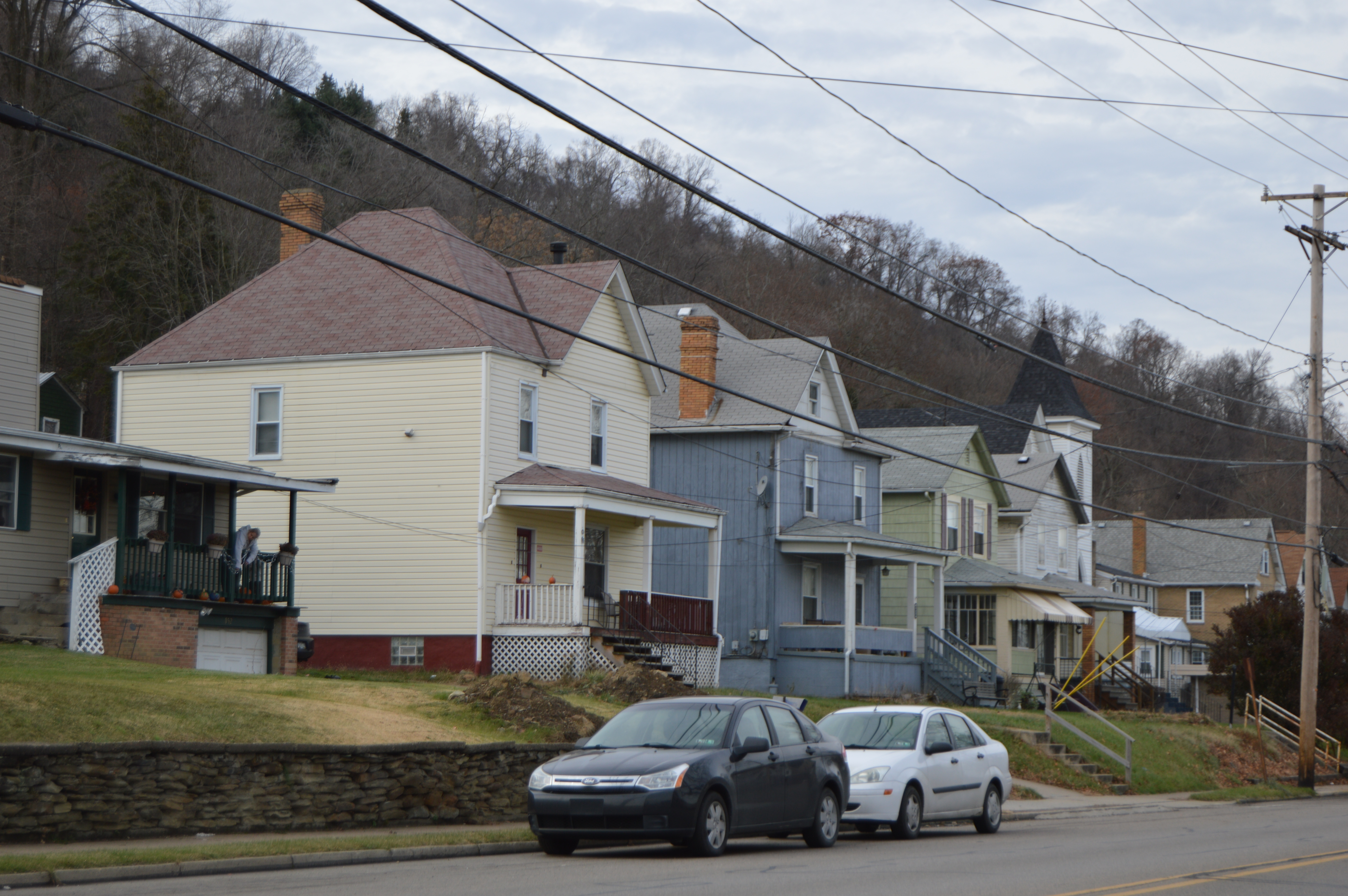
- Houses on Jordan Street
- Interactive map of South Heights, Pennsylvania
- Location within Pennsylvania Location within the United States
- Coordinates: 40°34′29″N 80°14′10″W
- Country: United States
- State: Pennsylvania
- County: Beaver
- Incorporated: 1910

Government
  - Type: Borough Council

Area
  - Total: 0.41 sq mi (1.05 km^{2})
  - Land: 0.33 sq mi (0.85 km^{2})
  - Water: 0.077 sq mi (0.20 km^{2})
- Elevation: 814 ft (248 m)

Population (2020)
  - Total: 384
  - Estimate (2021): 385
  - Density: 1,356/sq mi (523.4/km^{2})
- Time zone: UTC-5 (Eastern (EST))
  - Summer (DST): UTC-4 (EDT)
- Zip code: 15081
- Area code: 724
- FIPS code: 42-72216
- Website: https://www.sheightsboro.com/

South Heights is a borough in Beaver County, Pennsylvania, United States, along the Ohio River. The population was 384 at the 2020 census. South Heights was first known as Ethel's Landing, a docking point on the Ohio River. The name of the town was changed to Shannopin when the Pittsburgh and Lake Erie Railroad established a station there. When the name of the town was changed to South Heights, the station became known as South Heights station.

== Geography ==
South Heights is located in southeastern Beaver County at 40°34′29″N 80°14′10″W (40.574634, −80.236096). According to the United States Census Bureau, South Heights has a total area of 0.42 square miles (1.1 km^{2}), of which 0.31 square miles (0.8 km^{2}) is land and 0.077 square miles (0.2 km^{2}), or 20.69%, is water.

=== Surrounding and adjacent neighborhoods ===
South Heights has two land borders, including Hopewell Township to the north, south and west, and Crescent Township (Allegheny County) to the southwest. Across the Ohio River to the east, South Heights runs adjacent with the borough of Ambridge.

== Demographics ==
Historical population
Census	Pop.	Note	%±
1910	365		—
1920	439		20.3%
1930	549		25.1%
1940	604		10.0%
1950	691		14.4%
1960	740		7.1%
1970	799		8.0%
1980	765		−4.3%
1990	647		−15.4%
2000	542		−16.2%
2010	475		−12.4%
2020	384		−19.2%
2021 (est.)	385	▲	0.3%

As of the 2000 census, there were 542 people, 239 households, and 146 families residing in the borough. The population density was 1,556.5 inhabitants per square mile (601.0/km^{2}). There were 256 housing units at an average density of 735.2 per square mile (283.9/km^{2}). The racial makeup of the borough was 98.52% White, 0.74% African American, 0.18% Asian, and 0.55% from two or more races. Hispanic or Latino of any race were 0.37% of the population.

There were 239 households, out of which 23.4% had children under the age of 18 living with them, 46.0% were married couples living together, 8.4% had a female householder with no husband present, and 38.9% were non-families. 33.1% of all households were made up of individuals, and 11.3% had someone living alone who was 65 years of age or older. The average household size was 2.27 and the average family size was 2.91.

In the borough the population was spread out, with 20.1% under the age of 18, 6.1% from 18 to 24, 33.9% from 25 to 44, 23.8% from 45 to 64, and 16.1% who were 65 years of age or older. The median age was 39 years. For every 100 females, there were 104.5 males. For every 100 females age 18 and over, there were 95.0 males.

The median income for a household in the borough was $31,023, and the median income for a family was $36,625. Males had a median income of $27,361 versus $21,719 for females. The per capita income for the borough was $16,440. About 9.1% of families and 9.6% of the population were below the poverty line, including 10.9% of those under age 18 and 7.4% of those age 65 or over.

== See also ==
- List of cities and towns along the Ohio River
