= Hanover Township, Beaver County, Pennsylvania =

Township in Pennsylvania, US

Coordinates: 40°29′30″N 80°21′59″W

Hanover Township, Pennsylvania
- Township
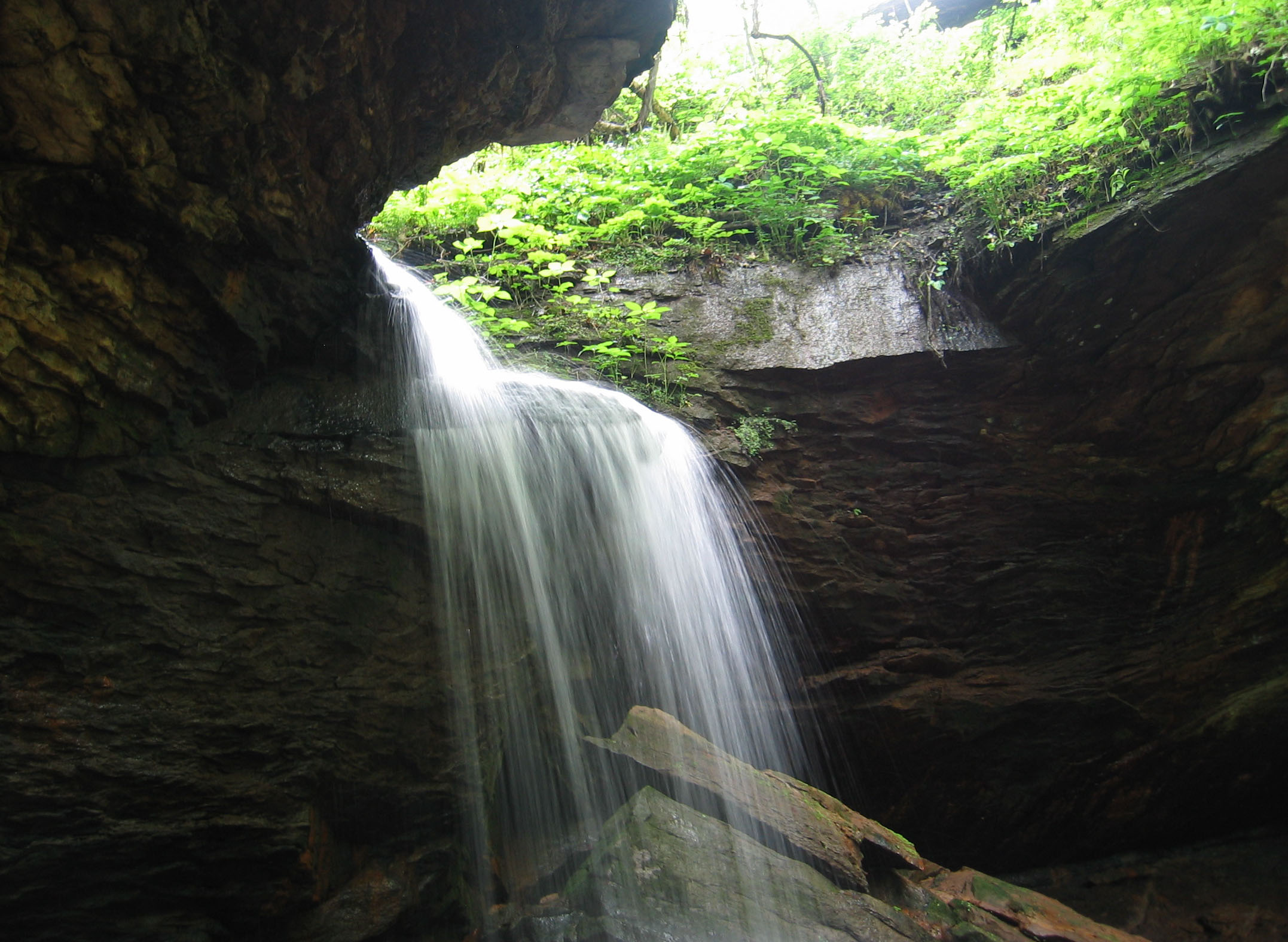
- Waterfall in Raccoon Creek State Park

- Location in Beaver County and state of Pennsylvania
- Country: United States
- State: Pennsylvania
- County: Beaver
- Settled: 1772
- Incorporated: 1786

Area
  - Total: 45.03 sq mi (116.63 km^{2})
  - Land: 44.88 sq mi (116.24 km^{2})
  - Water: 0.15 sq mi (0.40 km^{2})

Population (2020)
  - Total: 3,339 ▼
  - Estimate (2022): 3,293
  - Density: 80.6/sq mi (31.13/km^{2})
- Time zone: UTC-5 (Eastern (EST))
  - Summer (DST): UTC-4 (EDT)
- FIPS code: 42-007-32392
- Website: hanovertwp.us

Hanover Township is a township in Beaver County, Pennsylvania, United States. The population was 3,339 at the 2020 census. It is part of the Pittsburgh metropolitan area.

== History ==
Two historic sites in Hanover Township are listed on the National Register of Historic Places: the David Littell House, a nineteenth-century farmhouse, and the Recreational Demonstration Area part of Raccoon Creek State Park, which was built by the Civilian Conservation Corps during the Great Depression.

== Geography ==
According to the United States Census Bureau, Hanover Township has a total area of 45.0 square miles (116.6 km^{2}), of which 44.9 square miles (116.2 km^{2}) is land and 0.15 square miles (0.4 km^{2}), or 0.34%, is water.

=== Surrounding neighborhoods ===
Hanover Township has six borders, including Hancock County, West Virginia, to the west, the townships of Greene and Raccoon to the north, Independence to the east, and Washington County's Hanover Township to the south.

The small borough of Frankfort Springs is surrounded by Beaver County's Hanover Township to the north, east and west, with Washington County's township of the same name bordering the south.

== Demographics ==
Historical population
Census	Pop.	Note	%±
1970	2,154		—
1980	3,443		59.8%
1990	3,470		0.8%
2000	3,529		1.7%
2010	3,690		4.6%
2020	3,339		−9.5%
2022 (est.)	3,293		−1.4%
U.S. Decennial Census

As of the 2000 census, there were 3,529 people, 1,288 households, and 1,025 families residing in the township. The population density was 78.7 inhabitants per square mile (30.4/km^{2}). There were 1,413 housing units at an average density of 31.5 per square mile (12.2/km^{2}). The racial makeup of the township was 98.30% White, 0.60% African American, 0.20% Native American, 0.14% Asian, 0.20% from other races, and 0.57% from two or more races. Hispanic or Latino of any race were 0.99% of the population.

There were 1,288 households, out of which 35.5% had children under the age of 18 living with them, 70.0% were married couples living together, 6.7% had a female householder with no husband present, and 20.4% were non-families. 17.9% of all households were made up of individuals, and 6.8% had someone living alone who was 65 years of age or older. The average household size was 2.74 and the average family size was 3.11.

In the township the population was spread out, with 25.6% under the age of 18, 7.2% from 18 to 24, 30.5% from 25 to 44, 26.6% from 45 to 64, and 10.1% who were 65 years of age or older. The median age was 38 years. For every 100 females there were 100.9 males. For every 100 females age 18 and over, there were 99.8 males.

The median income for a household in the township was $44,393, and the median income for a family was $51,000. Males had a median income of $40,544 versus $24,770 for females. The per capita income for the township was $18,079. About 2.5% of families and 3.7% of the population were below the poverty line, including 5.8% of those under age 18 and 3.1% of those age 65 or over.

== Recreation ==
Raccoon Creek State Park occupies 7,500 acres (30 km^{2}) in the center of the township around the valley of Traverse Creek, a tributary of Raccoon Creek. Portions of the Pennsylvania State Game Lands Number 189 is located in Hanover Township. A portion of the larger parcel is located at the east end of Raccoon Creek State Park, and the small portion is located adjacent to the west end of the park.
