= Shira Yalon-Chamovitz =

Israeli occupational therapist (born 1962)

- שירה ילון-חיימוביץ
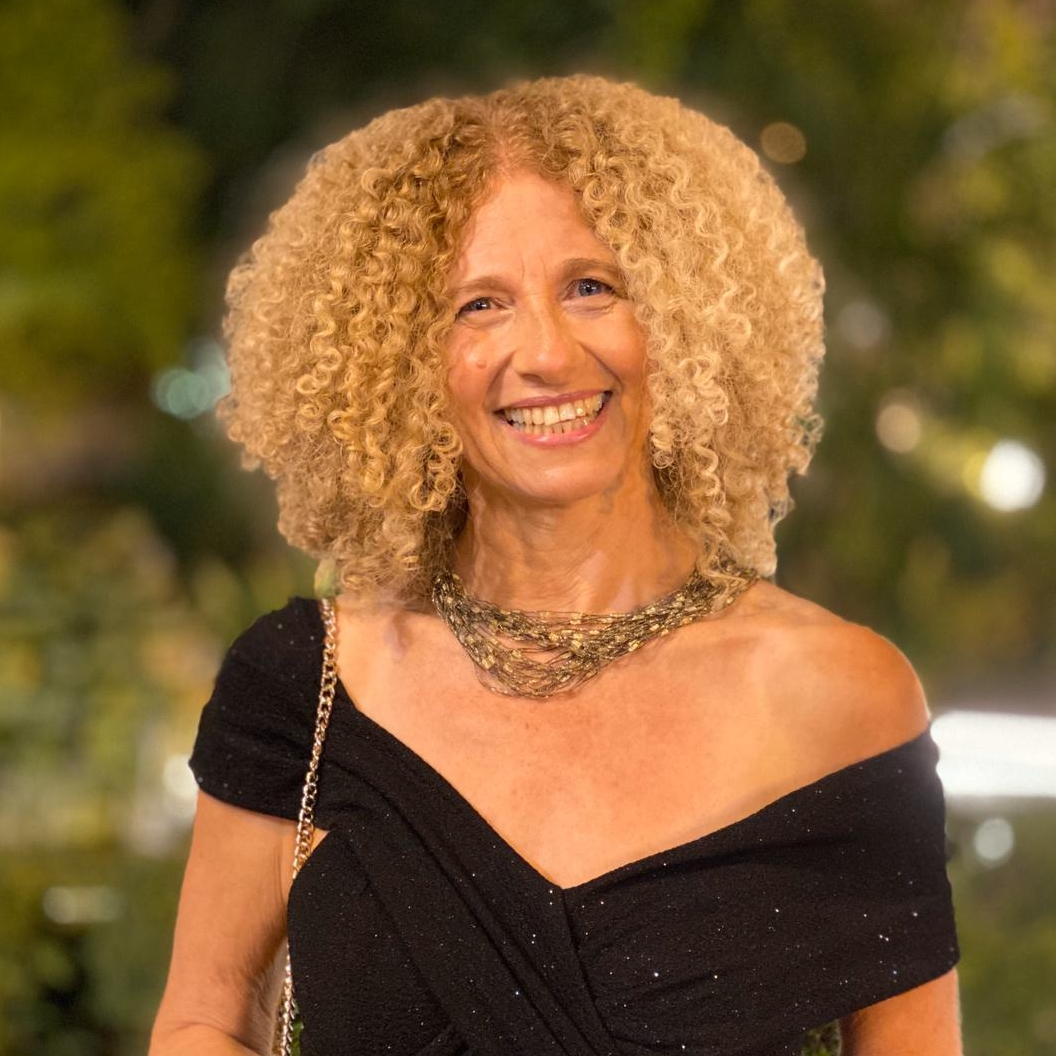
- Born: November 8, 1962 (age 63); Jerusalem, Israel
- Education: University of Connecticut (1993-2000, PhD, Educational Psychology); Hebrew University of Jerusalem (1993, MSc, Occupational therapy); Hebrew University of Jerusalem (1986, B.Sc., Occupational therapy,)
- Known for: Cognitive accessibility Simultaneous simplification
- Spouse: Daniel Chamovitz
- Scientific career
- Fields: Cognitive accessibility Occupational therapy Universal Design in Learning
- Workplaces: Ono Academic College
- Thesis: Everyday wisdom in people with mental retardation: Role of experience and practical intelligence
- Doctoral advisor: Stephen Greenspan

Shira Yalon-Chamovitz (Hebrew: שירה ילון-חיימוביץ; born 8 November 1962) is an Israeli occupational therapist. She is the president of the Levinsky-Wingate Academic Center director of the Israel Institute on Cognitive Accessibility. Previously she was Dean of Faculty of Health Professions Ono Academic College.Her work has shaped Israeli accessibility policy, and she is a global advocate for recognizing long COVID as a disability, drawing on her personal experience as a survivor.

She has made significant contributions to the field of accessibility for people with cognitive disabilities, having coined the terms "cognitive ramps" and "simultaneous simplification".

== Biography ==
Shira Yalon-Chamovitz received her undergraduate and Master degrees in Occupational Therapy from the Hebrew University of Jerusalem’s School of Occupational Therapy at Hadassah Medical School. She earned her Ph.D. in Educational Psychology from the University of Connecticut.

Yalon-Chamovitz is a licensed occupational therapist and a leading expert in service and cognitive accessibility. She was the founding Director of the Department of Occupational Therapy at Ono Academic College, where she later served as Dean of Students. In 2023 she was appointed Dean of the Faculty of Health Sciences. She also established the Israel office of the Burton Blatt Institute, a global center promoting the rights and inclusion of people with disabilities.

Before her tenure at Ono Academic College, Yalon-Chamovitz was a faculty member in the Department of Occupational Therapy at Tel Aviv University and a visiting scholar at the University of Washington in Seattle. Earlier in her career, she served as Director of Ancillary Services at Elwyn Jerusalem, a multidisciplinary center for individuals with disabilities.

Shira Yalon-Chamovitz is married to Daniel Chamovitz, an American-born plant geneticist and the seventh president of Ben-Gurion University of the Negev in Beer-Sheva.

== Academic career ==
Most of Yalon-Chamovitz's research has concerned adults with cognitive disabilities. During her doctoral research, she developed a video test of practical intelligence which was included in the DSM-5 for the diagnosis of intellectual disability. Subsequent research looked into the application of virtual reality for individuals with physical and intellectual disabilities, and the use of co-teaching models in service learning in occupational therapy education.

=== Cognitive Accessibility Work ===
Yalon-Chamovitz is one of the world’s pioneers in the field of cognitive accessibility. She published a theoretical model of practice for cognitive accessibility. This model has become the basis for subsequent models and implementation. She coined the concept of cognitive ramps—the equivalent of physical ramps, but for people who face intellectual or processing barriers when accessing information. Her academic and professional work integrates disability theory, plain language use, and real-time interpretation for cognitive disabilities.

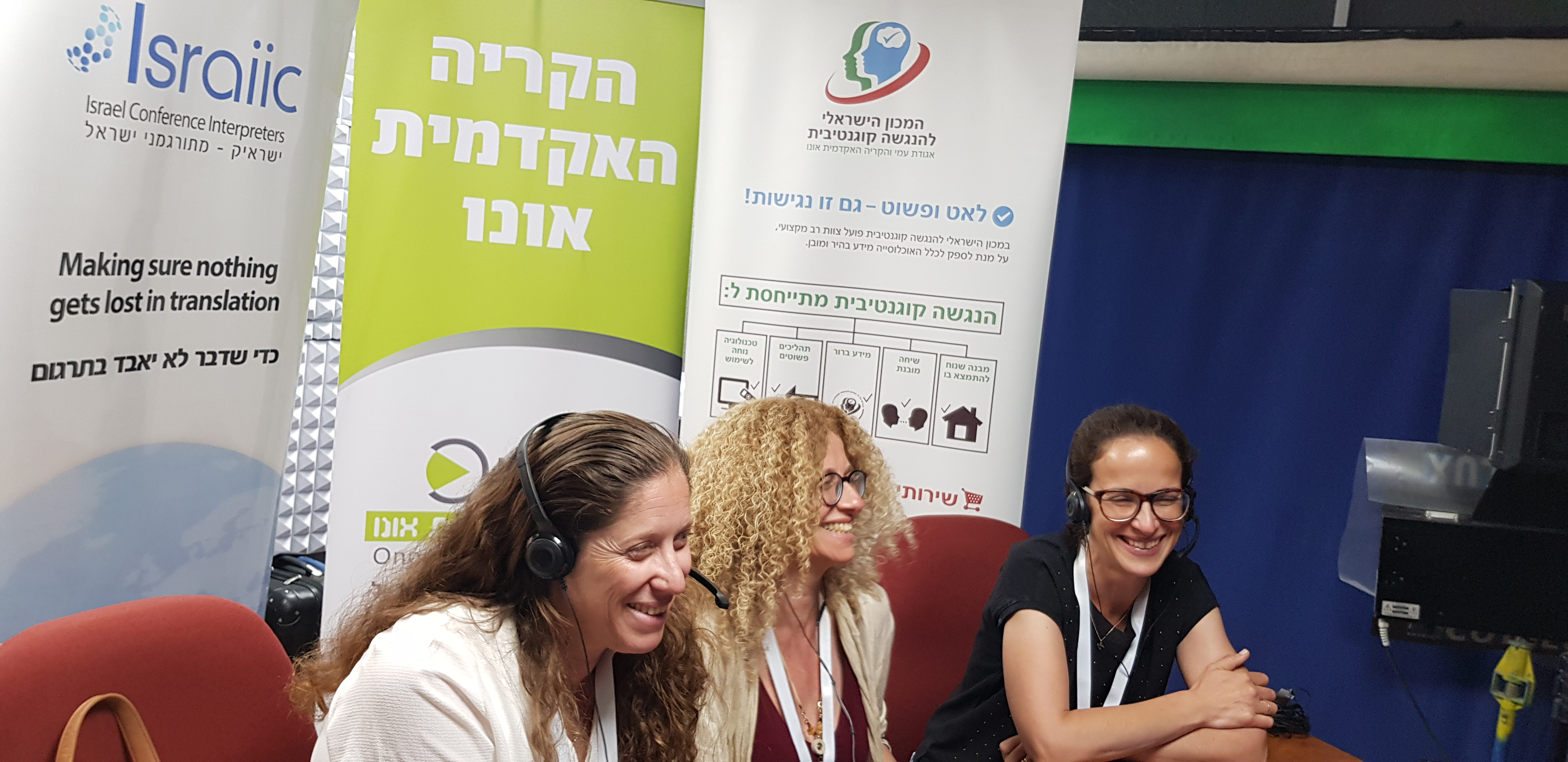
Simultaneous Simplification at the Eurovision Song Contest, 2019.

Based on this model, Yalon-Chamovitz developed the "Simultaneous Simplification" technique, which was first implemented globally during the Eurovision Song Contest 2019. The Israeli Public Broadcasting Corporation provided cognitive accessibility to the broadcast of the Eurovision through a digital video live stream, which involved translating what was said in real time in English into plain language Hebrew.

Yalon-Chamovitz was a member of the committee that wrote the 2015 Israeli accessibility regulations which legally mandated the use of simple language and/or language simplification (Hebrew = פישוט לשוני).

== Long COVID and Disability Advocacy ==
In 2023, Yalon-Chamovitz publicly disclosed her experience living with long COVID in a keynote interview at the Zero Project Conference in Vienna. She described persistent symptoms including fatigue and cognitive impairment, and detailed accommodations she implemented—such as using full scripts instead of notes and working with a personal assistant to manage job demands.

Drawing on her background in cognitive accessibility, she emphasized the need for public recognition of long COVID as a disabling condition. She advocated for government accountability, proactive outreach from NGOs, and the normalization of disability disclosure. Her remarks were widely circulated and praised for their clarity and honesty.

“I never imagined I would need the very accommodations I designed for others,” she stated in the interview. “But here I am.”

In 2026 she published her memoir Illuminating my Brain: A Journey into Cognitive Rehabilitation from Long Covid .
