= What a Plant Knows =

2012 book by Daniel Chamovitz

What a Plant Knows: A Field Guide to the Senses
- Author: Daniel Chamovitz
- Language: English
- Genre: Science book, Popular science
- Publisher: Scientific American / Farrar, Straus and Giroux (U.S.)
- Publication date: May 22, 2012 (U.S.)
- Publication place: United States
- Pages: 177 (Paperback edition: April 30, 2013); 201(Revised edition: Nov 21, 2017);

What a Plant Knows is a popular science book about sensory system of plants by Daniel Chamovitz. Originally published in 2012, the book explores how plants perceive their environment through senses analogous to human sight, smell, touch, hearing, and memory. The book has been translated into over 20 languages and has influenced discussions in plant biology, philosophy, and ethics. A revised edition was published in 2017.

Judiciously manipulating similes with dashes of anthropomorphism, Chamovitz introduces each of the vital human senses (all except taste) and explains its meaning for humans as contrasted with its function in plants. There are no noses or eyes as such in the plant world, but there are organs and responses that mimic our physiology. Much like how humans smell food, plants too have chemical receptors that bind to very specific gaseous chemical compounds. The author recounts how willows, attacked by caterpillars, send airborne pheromones to neighboring willows. Warned by these gaseous signals (or “smells”) of a nearby infestation, the neighbors begin manufacturing increased levels of toxic chemicals to render their leaves unpalatable to the caterpillars.

== Synopsis ==
The book is structured around the concept of plant senses, with each chapter dedicated to a specific sense:

Sight: Explores how plants detect light and its direction, enabling them to orient themselves for optimal photosynthesis.

Smell: Discusses how plants emit and detect volatile compounds, facilitating communication and defense mechanisms.

Taste: Discusses how plants secrete and detect soluble compounds, enabling communication between plants and regulation of plant nutrition.

Touch: Examines plants' responses to mechanical stimuli, such as the rapid closure of the Venus flytrap upon contact.

Hearing: Investigates the controversial idea that plants may respond to sound vibrations, although this area remains under scientific scrutiny.

Balance: Shows how plants perceive proprioception and coordinate movements.

Memory: Considers how plants can "remember" past exposures to stimuli, affecting future responses.

Chamovitz emphasizes that while plants do not possess consciousness, their sensory capabilities are complex and vital for survival.

== Release details / editions / publication ==
Hardcover edition, 2012
Paperback version, 2013
Revised edition, 2017

What a Plant Knows has been translated and published in a number of languages. Since its original publication, what a plant knows has been cited in over 500 academic journals influencing the discourse not only in plant biology, but in diverse Fields such as ethics, philosophy, and human biology.

Summary of What a Plant Knows editions
Language	Publisher	Publication year	notes
English (USA)	Scientific American/Farrar, Straus and Giroux	2012	2nd edition 2017
English (UK)	One World	2012	2nd edition 2017
English (Australia)	Scribe	2012	2nd edition 2017
Japanese	Kawade Shobo Shinsha	2012	
Chinese (simplified)	Beijing Mediatime Books	2012	2nd edition, 2018
Hebrew	Matar	2013	2nd edition, 2023
Chinese (complex)	Rye Field	2012	
German Was Pflanzen wissen: wie sie sehen, riechen und sich erinnern	Hanser	2012	2nd edition, 2017
Korean	Darun	2013	2nd edition 2019
Croatian	Planetopija	2013	
Estonian Mida Taim Teab	Aripaev	2012	
Polish Zmysłowe życie roślin: podreczny atlas zmysłów	WAB	2013	
Italian Quel che una pianta sa: guida ai sensi nel mondo vegetale	Cortina	2013	
French La Plante et ses sens	Buchet Chastel	2013	2nd edition 2018
Russian	Centrepolygraph	2017	
Serbian	Center for the Promotion of Science	2017	
Slovanian	ARA Zalozba	2018	
Czech	Academia	2020	
Turkish	Metis	2018	
Hungarian	Park Konyvkiado Kft	2018	
Spanish	Ariel	2019	
Thai	Bookscape Publishing House	2024	
