= Xing-Wang Deng =

Chinese plant biologist (born 1962)

- 邓兴旺
- Born: October 1962 (age 63)
- Education: Peking University (MS); University of California, Berkeley (PhD)
- Known for: Research on plant photomorphogenesis and heterosis
- Awards: Kumho Science International Award (2003)
- Scientific career
- Fields: Plant biology
- Workplaces: Yale University; Peking University

Xing-Wang Deng (Chinese: 邓兴旺; born October 1962) is a Chinese plant biologist known for his research on the genetic and biochemical mechanisms underlying light-regulated seedling development and plant heterosis. He has held faculty positions at Yale University and Peking University, and was elected a member of the National Academy of Sciences in 2013.

== Education and career ==
Deng received his master's degree from Peking University in 1985 and his PhD in plant biology from the University of California, Berkeley in 1989. He conducted postdoctoral research at Berkeley before joining the faculty of Yale University in 1992.

At Yale, Deng rose through the ranks to become the Daniel C. Eaton Professor of Molecular, Cellular and Developmental Biology. He was also affiliated with research programs in plant molecular genetics and biotechnology.

Deng later returned to China and joined Peking University, where he has held positions including university endowed professor and dean of the Institute of Advanced Agricultural Sciences.

== Research ==
Deng's research has focused on plant photomorphogenesis, particularly the molecular and genetic regulation of light-dependent seedling development in Arabidopsis. His work has contributed to understanding how plants perceive and respond to light signals at the cellular and genomic levels.

In addition to basic research, Deng has studied the genetic basis of plant heterosis (hybrid vigor) using genome-wide approaches, with applications to crop improvement.

== Honors and awards ==
Deng was elected a member of the National Academy of Sciences in 2013. He was also elected a fellow of the American Association for the Advancement of Science (AAAS) in 2012.

He received the Kumho Science International Award from the International Society for Plant Molecular Biology in 2003.
