= Raccoon Creek (Beaver County, Pennsylvania) =

Stream in Pennsylvania, USA

Raccoon Creek Tributary to Ohio River
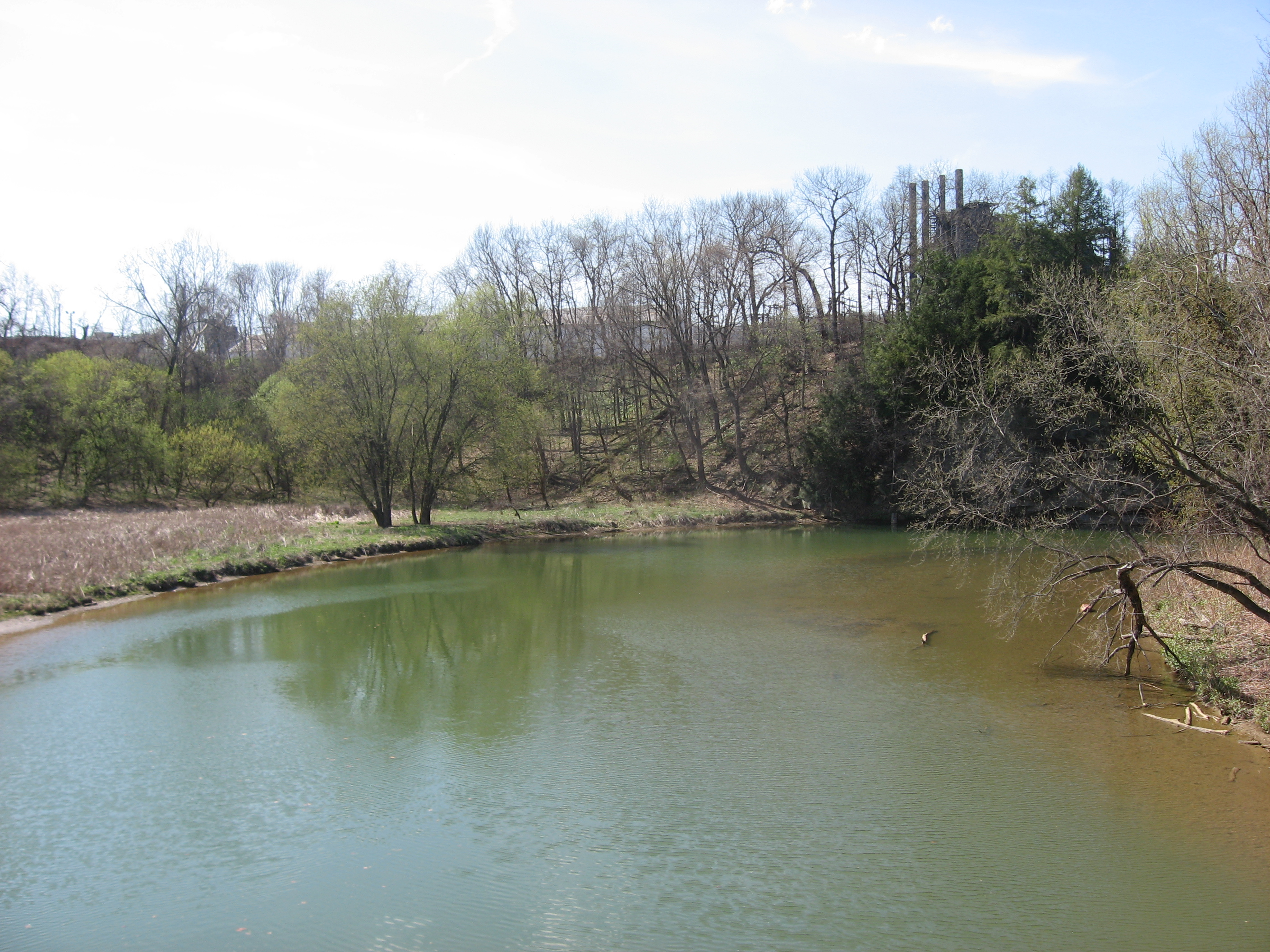
- Raccoon Creek near its mouth

- Location of Raccoon Creek mouth

Location
- Country: United States
- State: Pennsylvania
- Counties: Beaver County; Washington County, Pennsylvania, U.S.

Physical characteristics
- Source: divide between Raccoon Creek and Chartiers Creek
  - location: Hickory, Pennsylvania
  - coordinates: 40°18′15″N 080°19′21″W
  - elevation: 1,200 ft (370 m)
- Mouth: Ohio River
  - location: Ohioview, Pennsylvania
  - coordinates: 40°39′46″N 080°21′04″W
  - elevation: 700 ft (210 m)
- Length: 47.7 mi (76.8 km)
- Basin size: 477.21 square kilometres (184.25 sq mi)
- Discharge
  - location: Ohio River
  - average: 204.08 cu ft/s (5.779 m^{3}/s) at mouth with Ohio River

Basin features
- Progression: north
- River system: Ohio River
- Tributaries
  - left: Burgetts Fork; Brush Run; Wingfield Run; Traverse Creek; Little Traverse Creek; Frames Run; Gum Run; Fishpot Run
  - right: Cherry Run; Little Raccoon Run; Chamberlain Run; Potato Garden Run; Rareden Run
- Waterbodies: Cherry Valley Reservoir

Raccoon Creek is a tributary of the Ohio River in Beaver County, Pennsylvania. Raccoon Creek joins the Ohio River in Potter Township. Only a small portion of the creek is located within Raccoon Creek State Park. The stream within the park is Little Traverse Creek.

== See also ==
- List of rivers of Pennsylvania
