= Hopewell Township, Beaver County, Pennsylvania =

Township in Pennsylvania, US

Coordinates: 40°38′00″N 80°14′56″W

Hopewell Township, Pennsylvania
- Township
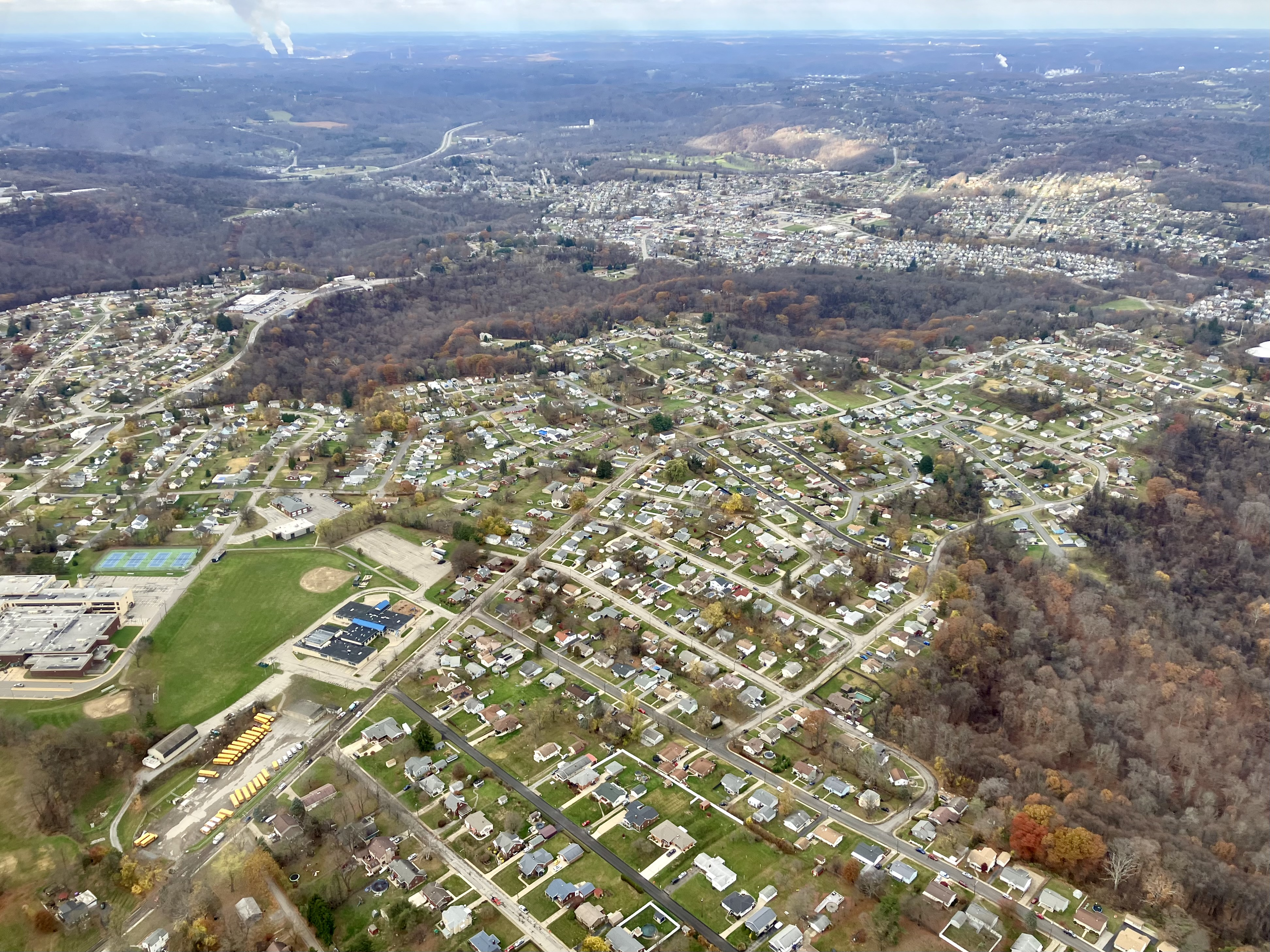
- Aerial view of Hopewell Township

- Flag Coat of arms
- Motto(s): Gateway to Beaver County, Pennsylvania
- Location in Beaver County, Pennsylvania
- Country: United States
- State: Pennsylvania
- County: Beaver
- Settled: 1770
- Incorporated: 1812

Area
  - Total: 16.99 sq mi (44.01 km^{2})
  - Land: 16.75 sq mi (43.39 km^{2})
  - Water: 0.24 sq mi (0.62 km^{2})

Population (2020)
  - Total: 13,506 ▼
  - Estimate (2022): 13,341
  - Density: 739.1/sq mi (285.35/km^{2})
- Time zone: UTC-5 (Eastern (EST))
  - Summer (DST): UTC-4 (EDT)
- FIPS code: 42-007-35640
- Website: www.hopewelltwp.com

Hopewell Township is a township in Beaver County, Pennsylvania, United States. The population was 13,506 at the 2020 census. It surrounds the city of Aliquippa and shares the city's ZIP Code. Hopewell Township is part of the Pittsburgh metropolitan area.

== Geography ==
Hopewell Township is located along the southeastern boundary of Beaver County. According to the United States Census Bureau, the township has a total area of 17.0 square miles (44.0 km^{2}), of which 16.8 square miles (43.4 km^{2}) is land and 0.23 square miles (0.6 km^{2}), or 1.40%, is water.

Since 1987, Hopewell has been home to a 97.5-acre (39.5 ha) RIDC industrial park.

=== Surrounding neighborhoods ===
Hopewell Township has seven borders. It encloses the city of Aliquippa on three sides and the borough of South Heights to the southeast. Where not shared with these two communities, the eastern boundary of the township follows the Ohio River. Other borders include the townships of Independence to the southwest, Raccoon in the northwestern corner, Center to the north and northwest, and the Allegheny County townships of Crescent and Moon to the southeast.

== Demographics ==
Historical population
Census	Pop.	Note	%±
1970	14,133		—
1980	14,662		3.7%
1990	13,274		−9.5%
2000	13,254		−0.2%
2010	12,593		−5.0%
2020	13,506		7.3%
2022 (est.)	13,341		−1.2%
U.S. Decennial Census

As of the 2000 census, there were 13,254 people, 5,446 households, and 3,926 families residing in the township. The population density was 783.7 inhabitants per square mile (302.6/km^{2}). There were 5,636 housing units at an average density of 333.2 per square mile (128.6/km^{2}). The racial makeup of the township was 91.81% White, 7.34% African American, 0.01% Native American, 0.32% Asian, 0.02% Pacific Islander, 0.05% from other races, and 0.45% from two or more races. Hispanic or Latino of any race were 0.49% of the population.

There were 5,446 households, out of which 27.1% had children under the age of 18 living with them, 59.0% were married couples living together, 10.1% had a female householder with no husband present, and 27.9% were non-families. 25.4% of all households were made up of individuals, and 13.4% had someone living alone who was 65 years of age or older. The average household size was 2.41 and the average family size was 2.88.

In the township, the population was spread out, with 21.2% under the age of 18, 5.2% from 18 to 24, 27.9% from 25 to 44, 24.0% from 45 to 64, and 21.8% who were 65 years of age or older. The median age was 42 years. For every 100 females there were 89.1 males. For every 100 females age 18 and over, there were 85.7 males.

The median income for a household in the township was $42,065, and the median income for a family was $52,521. Males had a median income of $38,380 versus $25,851 for females. The per capita income for the township was $20,802. About 4.6% of families and 6.0% of the population were below the poverty line, including 7.6% of those under age 18 and 7.8% of those age 65 or over.

== USAir Flight 427 ==
On September 8, 1994, USAir Flight 427 crashed in Hopewell Township, near the city of Aliquippa, as it was preparing to land at Pittsburgh International Airport, killing all 127 passengers and five crew members on board. The cause was traced to the Boeing 737 rudder issues.

== Education ==
Children in Hopewell are served by the Hopewell Area School District. The current schools serving Hopewell are:

- Hopewell Elementary School – grades K–4
- Independence Elementary School – grades K–4
- Margaret Ross Elementary School – grades K–4
- Hopewell Memorial Junior High School – grades 5–8
- Hopewell High School – grades 9–12

== Notable people ==
- Tony Dorsett, former football running back in the National Football League for the Dallas Cowboys and the Denver Broncos
- Christa Harmotto, former professional volleyball player who played as a middle blocker for the United States women's national volleyball team
- Paul Posluszny, former professional football linebacker in the National Football League, primarily with the Jacksonville Jaguars
