= Raccoon Township, Pennsylvania =

Township in Pennsylvania, US

- Township
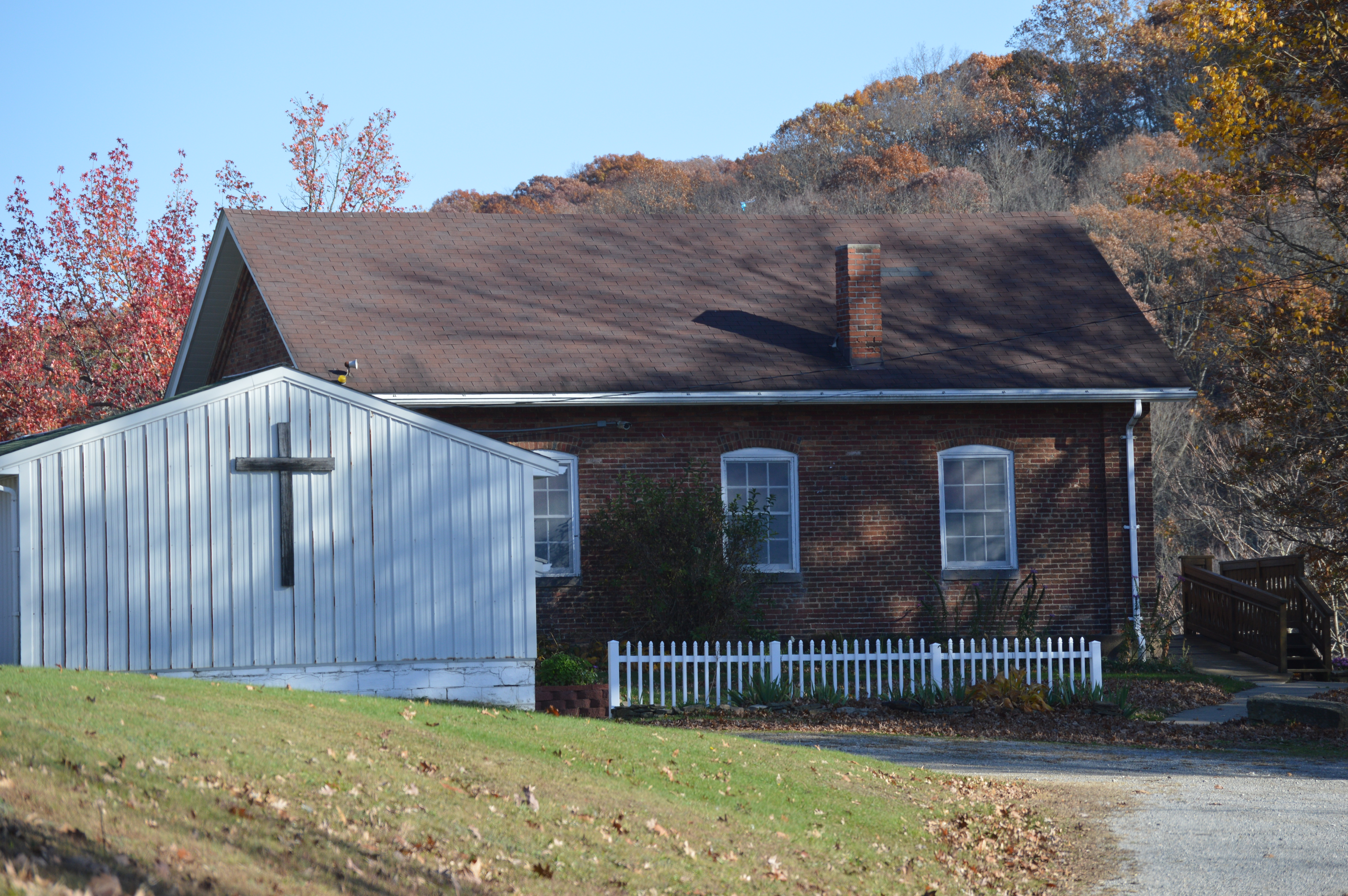
- Service United Presbyterian Church, established c. 1792

- Location in Beaver County and state of Pennsylvania
- Coordinates: 40°36′02″N 80°22′10″W
- Country: United States
- State: Pennsylvania
- County: Beaver
- Incorporated: 1833

Area
  - Total: 19.44 sq mi (50.34 km^{2})
  - Land: 18.84 sq mi (48.79 km^{2})
  - Water: 0.60 sq mi (1.56 km^{2})

Population (2020)
  - Total: 2,788 ▼
  - Estimate (2021): 2,759
  - Density: 158/sq mi (61.1/km^{2})
- Time zone: UTC-5 (Eastern (EST))
  - Summer (DST): UTC-4 (EDT)
- FIPS code: 42-007-63224
- Website: www.raccoontownship.org

Raccoon Township is a township that is located in Beaver County, Pennsylvania, United States. The population was 2,788 at the time of the 2020 census.

It is part of the Pittsburgh metropolitan area.

== Geography ==
Raccoon Township is located in southern Beaver County. According to the United States Census Bureau, the township has a total area of 19.4 square miles (50.3 km^{2}), of which 18.8 square miles (48.8 km^{2}) is land and 0.62 square miles (1.6 km^{2}), or 3.10%, is water.

=== Surrounding neighborhoods ===
Raccoon Township has eight borders, including Potter Township to the north, Center Township to the east, Hopewell Township to the east-southeast, Independence Township to the southeast, Hanover Township to the south, Greene Township to the west, Shippingport to the northwest, and Industry to the north-northwest.

== Demographics ==
Historical population
Census	Pop.	Note	%±
1970	2,615		—
1980	3,133		19.8%
1990	3,426		9.4%
2000	3,397		−0.8%
2010	3,064		−9.8%
2020	2,788		−9.0%
2021 (est.)	2,759		−1.0%
U.S. Decennial Census

As of the 2000 census, there were 3,397 people, 1,186 households, and 970 families residing in the township.

The population density was 183.3 inhabitants per square mile (70.8/km^{2}). There were 1,227 housing units at an average density of 66.2 per square mile (25.6/km^{2}).

The racial makeup of the township was 98.70% White, 0.38% African American, 0.15% Native American, 0.03% Asian, 0.09% from other races, and 0.65% from two or more races. Hispanic or Latino of any race were 0.71% of the population.

There were 1,186 households, out of which 39.6% had children under the age of 18 living with them; 69.1% were married couples living together, 8.4% had a female householder with no husband present, and 18.2% were non-families. 15.9% of all households were made up of individuals, and 6.2% had someone living alone who was 65 years of age or older.

The average household size was 2.82 and the average family size was 3.15.

Within the township, the population was spread out, with 27.1% of residents who were under the age of 18, 6.1% who were aged 18 to 24, 30.8% who were aged 25 to 44, 26.7% who were aged 45 to 64, and 9.3% who were 65 years of age or older. The median age was 38 years.

For every 100 females, there were 99.9 males. For every 100 females who were aged 18 or older, there were 97.0 males.

The median income for a household in the township was $53,036, and the median income for a family was $58,533. Males had a median income of $44,647 compared with that of $22,171 for females.

The per capita income for the township was $19,363.

Approximately 5.0% of families and 5.4% of the population were living below the poverty line, including 3.6% of those who were under the age of 18 and 12.6% of those who were aged 65 or older.
