= Independence Township, Beaver County, Pennsylvania =

Township in Pennsylvania, US

Coordinates: 40°29′45″N 80°20′24″W

Independence Township, Pennsylvania
- Township
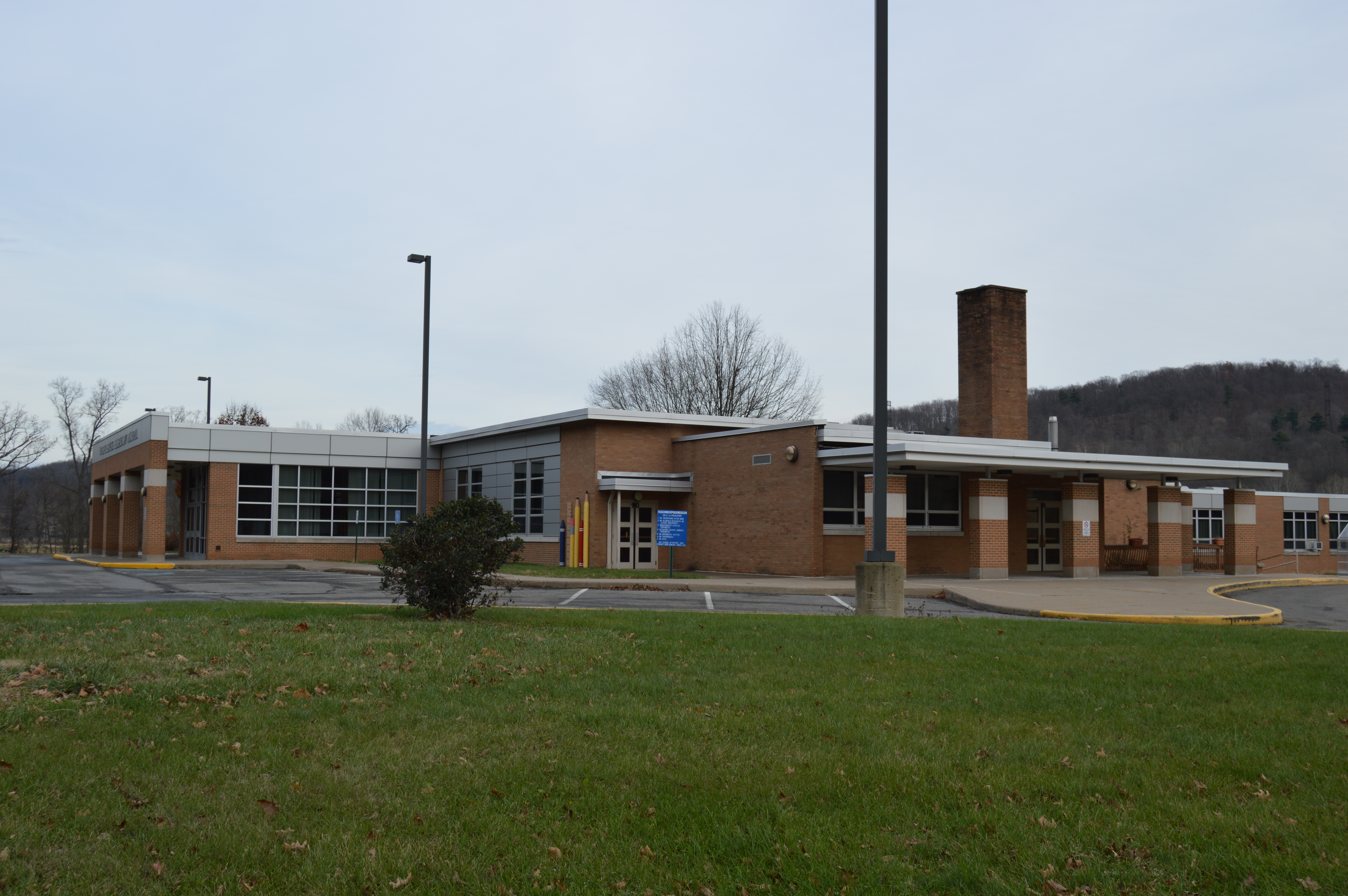
- Independence Elementary School

- Location in Beaver County and state of Pennsylvania
- Country: United States
- State: Pennsylvania
- County: Beaver
- Incorporated: 1848

Government
  - Type: Township Commissioners
  - Chairman: Daniel V. McLaughlin
  - Supervisor: Wayne R. Potts
  - Supervisor: John J. Fratangeli

Area
  - Total: 23.42 sq mi (60.65 km^{2})
  - Land: 23.18 sq mi (60.03 km^{2})
  - Water: 0.24 sq mi (0.61 km^{2})

Population (2020)
  - Total: 2,246 ▼
  - Estimate (2022): 2,215
  - Density: 104.9/sq mi (40.49/km^{2})
- Time zone: UTC-5 (Eastern (EST))
  - Summer (DST): UTC-4 (EDT)
- FIPS code: 42-007-36776
- Website: Website

Independence Township is a township which is located in Beaver County, Pennsylvania. The population was 2,246 at the time of the 2020 census.

It is part of the Pittsburgh metropolitan area.

== Geography ==
Independence Township is located in the southeastern portion of Beaver County. According to the United States Census Bureau, Independence Township has a total area of 23.4 square miles (60.6 km^{2}), of which 23.2 square miles (60.0 km^{2}) is land and 0.23 square miles (0.6 km^{2}), or 1.01%, is water.

== Recreation ==
A portion of Raccoon Creek State Park and a portion of the Pennsylvania State Game Lands Number 189 are located at the western end of Independence Township.

=== Surrounding neighborhoods ===
Independence Township has four borders, including the townships of Hanover to the west, Raccoon to the northwest, Hopewell to the northeast and Findlay (Allegheny County) to the southeast.

== Demographics ==
Historical population
Census	Pop.	Note	%±
1970	1,761		—
1980	2,534		43.9%
1990	2,563		1.1%
2000	2,802		9.3%
2010	2,503		−10.7%
2020	2,246		−10.3%
2022 (est.)	2,215		−1.4%
U.S. Decennial Census

As of the 2000 census, there were 2,802 people, 1,007 households, and 785 families residing in the township.

The population density was 122.5 inhabitants per square mile (47.3/km^{2}). There were 1,069 housing units at an average density of 46.7 per square mile (18.0/km^{2}).

The racial makeup of the township was 97.82% White, 0.18% African American, 0.11% Native American, 0.18% from other races, and 1.71% from two or more races. Hispanic or Latino of any race were 0.61% of the population.

There were 1,007 households, out of which 38.7% had children under the age of 18 living with them; 64.1% were married couples living together, 9.4% had a female householder with no husband present, and 22.0% were non-families. 17.9% of all households were made up of individuals, and 5.1% had someone living alone who was 65 years of age or older.

The average household size was 2.78 and the average family size was 3.17.

Within the township, the population was spread out, with 27.6% who were under the age of 18, 6.6% aged between 18 and 24, 32.4% between 25 and 44, 23.7% between 45 and to 64, and 9.7% who were 65 years of age or older. The median age was 37 years.

For every 100 females there were 102.7 males. For every 100 females who were aged 18 and older, there were 102.0 males.

The median income for a household in the township was $40,372, and the median income for a family was $47,153. Males had a median income of $34,911 compared with that of $27,045 for females.

The per capita income for the township was $17,946.

Roughly 5.1% of families and 7.7% of the population were living below the poverty line, including 10.3% of those who were under the age of 18 and 2.9% of those who were aged 65 or older.
