= List of rail trails in Pennsylvania =

Pennsylvania Rail Trails are former railway lines that have been converted to paths designed for pedestrian, bicycle, skating, equestrian, or light motorized traffic. Rail trails are multi-use paths offering, at a minimum, a combination of pedestrian and cycle recreation.

== Trails beginning from A to E ==
- A
  - Allegheny Portage Railroad Trail
  - Allegheny Valley River Trail
  - Arboretum Trail
  - Armstrong Trail
  - Arrowhead Trail, Washington County
- B
  - Back Mountain Trail
  - Beaver River Trail
  - Bellefonte Central Rail Trail
  - Bristol Spurline Park Trail
  - Buffalo Valley Rail Trail
  - Butler-Freeport Community Trail
- C
  - Chester Valley Trail
  - Clarion Highlands Trail
  - Clarion - Little Toby Creek Trail
  - Clearfield to Grampian Trail
  - Conestoga Greenway Trail
  - Conewago Recreation Trail
  - Corry Junction Greenway Trail
  - Cumberland County Biker/Hiker Trail
  - Cumberland Valley Rail Trail
  - Cynwyd Heritage Trail
- D
  - D&H Trail
  - D&L Trail
  - Dimeling to Madera Trail
- E
  - East Branch Trail
  - Endless Mountain Riding Trail
  - Ernst Bike Trail

== Trails beginning from F to M ==
- F
  - Five Star Trail
  - Forks Township Recreational Trail
- G
  - Ghost Town Trail
  - Great Allegheny Passage
  - Greene River Trail
- H
  - Harmony Trail
  - Hike & Bike Trail
  - Hoodlebug Trail
  - Hoover-Mason Trestle
  - Houtzdale Line Trail
  - Huntingdon and Broad Top Trail
- I
  - Indian Creek Valley Trail
  - Ironton Rail-trail
- J
  - James Mayer Riverwalk
  - JFK Walking Trail
  - John B. Bartram Trail
- K
  - Kellettville To Nebraska Trail
  - Knox & Kane Rail Trail
- L
  - Lancaster Junction Trail
  - Lebanon Valley Rail Trail
  - Lehigh & New England Trail
  - Lehigh Gorge Trail
  - LeTort Spring Run Nature Trail
  - Liberty Bell Trail
  - Lower Trail
  - Luzerne County Rail Trail
  - Lycoming Creek Bikeway
- M
  - Mahoning Shadow Trail
  - Montour Trail

== Trails beginning from N to Z ==
- N
  - Nor-Bath Trail
- O
  - O&W Rail Trail
  - Ohio River Trail
- P
  - Palmer Bikeway
  - Panhandle Trail
  - Penns Creek Path
  - Pennypack Trail
  - Perkiomen Trail
  - Phoenix Iron Canal Trail
  - Pine Creek Rail Trail
  - Plainfield Township Trail
- R
  - Radnor Trail
  - Railroad Grade Trail
  - Roaring Run Trail
  - Rotary Walk Trail
- S
  - Samuel Justus Recreational Trail
  - Sandy Creek Trail
  - Saucon Valley Rail Trail
  - Schuylkill River Trail
  - Sewickley Creek Trail
  - Sheepskin Trail
  - Snow Shoe Trail
  - Stavich Bike Trail
  - Stony Valley Railroad Grade
  - Struble Trail
  - Susquehanna Warrior Trail
  - Switchback Railroad Trail
- T
  - Tidioute Riverside Rec Trek Trail
  - Towpath Bike Trail
  - Tredway Trail
  - Trolley Trail
- W
  - Warren to North Warren Bike Trail
  - Warwick-to-Ephrata Rail Trail
  - West Penn Trail
  - Westmoreland Heritage Trail
  - Wynn & Clara Tredway River Park
- Y
  - York County Heritage Rail Trail

== Trails beginning 0-10 ==
6

- 6 to 10 Trail

== See also ==
- List of mountain biking areas and trails in Pennsylvania
