= Rennerdale, Pennsylvania =

Unincorporated community in Pennsylvania, US

- Census-designated place
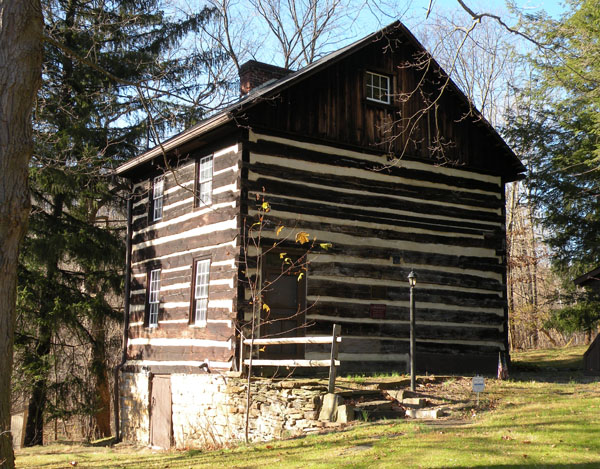
- Walker-Ewing Log House, built around 1790

- Location in Allegheny County and state of Pennsylvania
- Coordinates: 40°23′52″N 80°8′26″W
- Country: United States
- State: Pennsylvania
- County: Allegheny
- Township: Collier

Area
  - Total: 0.79 sq mi (2.05 km^{2})
  - Land: 0.79 sq mi (2.05 km^{2})
  - Water: 0 sq mi (0.00 km^{2})

Population (2020)
  - Total: 1,103
  - Density: 1,393.9/sq mi (538.17/km^{2})
- Time zone: UTC-5 (Eastern (EST))
  - Summer (DST): UTC-4 (EDT)
- FIPS code: 42-64184

Rennerdale is an unincorporated community and census-designated place in Collier Township, Allegheny County, Pennsylvania, United States, about 9 miles (14 km) southwest of Pittsburgh. As of the 2020 census it had a population of 1,103.

== Geography ==
Set in the Allegheny Plateau, Rennerdale is built on a southward-facing hill that slopes from 1,032 feet (315 m) down to 882 feet (269 m), where it approaches Robinson's Run, a creek that flows eastward toward Chartiers Creek and the Ohio River. The surrounding area was mined for coal from as early as 1870, but the only currently active extraction enterprise is a quarry east of the town.

== Demographics ==
Historical population
| Census | Pop. | Note | %± |
|---|---|---|---|
| 2020 | 1,103 | | — |
U.S. Decennial Census

== History ==
An early settler of this region was James Ewing, who arrived in 1770 and built a grist mill on Robinson's Run. Gabriel Walker and Isaac Walker, Scots-Irish brothers from Lancaster County, Pennsylvania, arrived in 1772. Gabriel Walker's household was raided by a British-aligned Native American war party in 1782. Walker's Mills, the village east of Rennerdale, is named for Isaac Walker. Between 1760 and 1790, Gabriel Walker built a log cabin about 2 miles (3 km) northwest of present-day Rennerdale; today known as the Walker-Ewing Log House, the structure still stands. In 1976, it was placed on the National Register of Historic Places. Many Walkers have continued to live in the area up to the present day.

An 1876 atlas of Pittsburgh shows only these families residing on the land where Rennerdale is now located: Mrs. J. Maloney, James Hayes, J.E. Walker, E. Walker and G. Walker.

Rennerdale's origins as a town are connected to the railroad. A railway that followed Robinson's Run was known as the Panhandle Route, because it crossed the Northern Panhandle of West Virginia. Connecting Pittsburgh with Cincinnati, Ohio, the railway was operated by the Pittsburgh, Cincinnati, Chicago and St. Louis Railroad (PCC&StL) and the Pittsburgh, Cincinnati and St. Louis Railroad. John W. Renner (b. January 1, 1845 in Petersburg, Pennsylvania - d. after 1915) was a comptroller for the latter company and for the Pennsylvania Railroad. In 1895, 60 acres on the PCC&StL line near Pittsburgh were purchased, and employees of the railroad's Lines West Accounting Department founded the town, which was named Rennerdale in honor of the comptroller.

The 1910 census does not list Rennerdale as part of Collier Township, but 72 persons are counted on Sunnyside Avenue. Of the 21 heads of households, 11 were clerks in the railroad.

The 1920 census enumerated 319 persons specifically in Rennerdale. Many heads of households were clerks in the railroad office; the others were either railway workers, miners or laborers. The following streets were extant: Sunnyside Avenue, Home Avenue, Linden Avenue, Maple Avenue and State Street (probably Noblestown Road). One of these clerks, William Kerr, was instrumental in establishing national Flag Day.

== Description ==
Rennerdale has some 320 single-family homes, many built between 1920 and 1960, with the newest built in 2005, and the oldest built in the 1840s. Most homes sit on lots larger than half an acre, many with full-grown trees.

Rennerdale's sole house of worship, Rennerdale United Presbyterian Church, is located at 151 Noblestown Road. In addition to services, the church hosts community meetings, such as the monthly meeting of the Pittsburgh chapter of the National Railway Historical Society.

The Rennerdale Volunteer Fire Department, located at 30 Suburban Avenue, provides emergency and firefighting services. It also sponsors an annual Halloween parade. Next to the fire station is a small spring-fed pond, where there is some recreational fishing (with a traditional catch and release policy). The pond is home to a number of ducks who live there year-round and provide the mascot for the fire department. Visitors enjoy feeding the ducks and seeing new ducklings each spring. When the pond freezes over in winter, the townspeople use it for skating and ice hockey.

On the eastern end of town, Webb Field has two baseball fields (Little Webb and Big Webb) and a pavilion for community events. (Webb Field is named after Edward N. Webb, one of the original founders of Rennerdale Little League. The field was dedicated in 1967).

The Rennerdale section of the Panhandle Trail includes a quarry and pond where a stage has been erected using original stones from the quarry. This area plays hosts to two annual events, hosted by the Friends of the Panhandle Trail in cooperation with the Township and local civic groups. The Night Walk on the Panhandle Trail is held each Halloween. Rennerdale Church Youth Group, with assistance from local boy scout and girl scout troops, carves over 100 Jack-O-Lanterns to line the trail. Vendors, a bonfire, storytelling and food are available. Rock the Quarry is held each August, when local bands take the stage vendors offer a variety of food, drinks and goods.

Rennerdale belongs to the Chartiers Valley School District, which includes Chartiers Valley Primary School, Intermediate School, Middle School and High School.

As an unincorporated community, Rennerdale has no mayor or police force.

== Environs of Rennerdale ==
Less than a mile northwest of Rennerdale is Settler's Cabin Park, a 1,589-acre (6.43 km^{2}) Allegheny County park, which includes the Walker-Ewing-Glass Log House, a wave pool, a diving pool, tennis courts, groves, shelters and trails.

Immediately south of Rennerdale, the Panhandle Trail is a hike/bike rail trail that follows the bed of the old Panhandle railroad. The Panhandle Trail currently runs 29 miles (47 km) from Walker's Mills, Collier Township, to just outside Weirton, West Virginia. It connects with the Montour Trail between McDonald, Pennsylvania and the village of Primrose. An abandoned quarry alongside the trail serves as a backdrop for picnics and community parties. In the woods south of the trail is Fossils Cliff, notable for its plentiful fossils, mostly of fern leaves.

Atop the ridge south of Rennerdale is a private, Jack Nicklaus-designed golf course, The Club at Nevillewood, with a surrounding community.

Atop the western ridge is a former Project Nike missile site, known as the Charles E. Kelly Support Facility, which provided headquarters for the Army's 99th Regional Readiness Command (RRC). The facility was scheduled for closing by the 2005 Base Realignment and Closure Commission. In 2008, the Kelly Center Local Redevelopment Authority (KCLRA) oversaw the development of a re-use plan for the base. This plan envisioned a small town center; recreation facilities, including ball fields, hiking paths and picnic areas; a small retail center; a small office/warehouse complex; a local emergency medical services center; and a public library. In April, 2009, the 99th RRC relocated to Fort Dix, New Jersey. The $4.5 million Collier Township Community Center opened in 2015.

== Education ==
It is in the Chartiers Valley School District

== See also ==
- Oakdale, Pennsylvania
- Raid on Robinson Run (1782)
- Walker-Ewing Log House
