= Arrowhead Trail =

Arrowhead Trail may refer to:

- Arrowhead Trail (auto trail), connecting Los Angeles, California to Salt Lake City, Utah
- Arrowhead Trail, Pennsylvania, a rail trail in Washington County, Pennsylvania, see List of rail trails in Pennsylvania
