= Raid on Robinson Run (1782) =

Frontier raid in western Pennsylvania in September 1782

Coordinates: 40.4014°N 80.1477°W

- Part of the American Revolutionary War
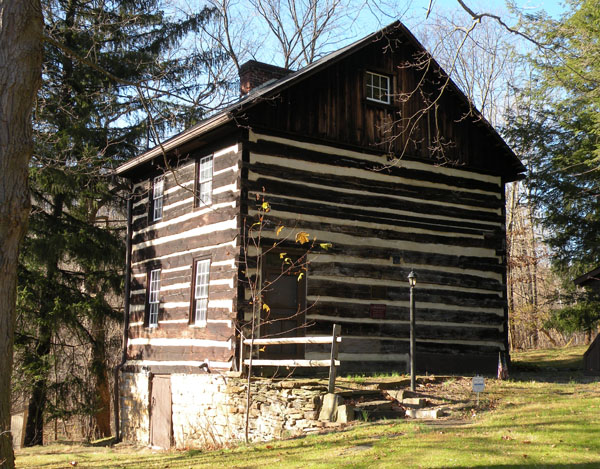
- The Walker-Ewing cabin, built after the original was pillaged and burnt.
Date	September 1782
Location	Rennerdale, Collier Township, Allegheny County, Pennsylvania
Result	Raid carried out, cabin destroyed, captives taken; settler pursuit ended at the Ohio River crossing

Belligerents
Frontier settlers and militia	British-aligned Native American war party

Strength
Pursuit party: about 40-50 settlers and militia	About 25 raiders

Casualties and losses
- 2 children killed 3 children taken captive Gabriel Walker cabin burned

The Raid on Robinson Run was a frontier raid in September 1782 at the homestead of Gabriel Walker along Robinson Run in what is now southwestern Allegheny County, Pennsylvania. A Native American war party of about twenty-five surprised household members working near the cabin and in the fields and captured five children. The cabin was plundered and burned. The raiders then moved toward the nearby fortified refuge known as Ewing's Fort, also described as the blockhouse of James Ewing, where neighbors had gathered after the alarm was raised. Two of the youngest captives were killed within sight of the refuge, and three others, a boy and two girls, were carried northwest to British held posts and later returned at the end of the Revolutionary War.

== Background ==
The Walker family settled along Robinson Run in the early 1770s, establishing cabins and small farms in a district that remained exposed to wartime raiding. Nearby settlers relied on alarms and concentration at small fortified refuges, including Ewing's Fort, when danger threatened.

== Raid ==
The raiders waited near the Walker cabin with the intention of surprising the household at midday. Their attack was delayed while armed travelers were present at the cabin. After the visitors departed, members of the household and assistants were working outside near the fields and cabin when the raiders rushed in.

Five Walker children were taken in the initial assault. A bound boy attached to the household, William Harkins, escaped and ran down Robinson Run to raise the alarm at the blockhouse and among neighboring settlers. Gabriel Walker and his wife escaped separately and reached the refuge with other settlers.

After capturing the children, the raiders pillaged the cabin and burned it to the ground. They then moved toward Ewing's Fort, where settlers had crowded for protection. Reinforcements arriving from surrounding settlements deterred a direct assault on the blockhouse. Before withdrawing, the raiders killed and scalped two of the youngest captives in view of the defenders, then departed northwest with the three surviving captives.

== Pursuit ==
Settlers quickly organized a pursuit party, commonly described as forty to fifty men under the leadership of John Henry. They followed the trail northwest toward the Ohio River.

The pursuit caught the raiders at an Ohio River crossing near Logstown as canoes were being loaded. Shots were fired at the departing canoes, and at least one raider was believed to have been hit. The captives were kept concealed and threatened with death if they called out, preventing a rescue. The pursuit ended after the raiders completed the crossing because the settlers lacked boats or other means to follow. The exact crossing point is not uniform in the local tradition. Logstown is the most frequent identification, while some local traditions place the crossing downstream near Stoop's Ferry.

== Captivity and return ==
The three surviving captives were carried west to British held posts in the western theater, commonly identified with the Detroit network. After the war they were released and returned east, with later narratives describing travel to Philadelphia followed by an overland return across the mountains to western Pennsylvania.

== See also ==
- Robinson Run (Chartiers Creek tributary)
- Collier Township
- Western theater of the American Revolutionary War
- Battle of Wyoming
- Settlers Cabin Park
