= Pittsburgh Botanic Garden =

Botanical garden in Pennsylvania

- Pittsburgh Botanic Garden's Welcome Center in November 2024

- Location within Pennsylvania Location within the United States
- Type: Botanical garden
- Location: Oakdale, Pennsylvania
- Nearest city: Pittsburgh, Pennsylvania
- Coordinates: 40°25′3.47″N 80°10′21.13″W
- Area: 460 acres (190 ha)
- Opened: 2015
- Visitors: 54,000 (in 2021)
- Status: Open year round
- Website: pittsburghbotanicgarden.org

Pittsburgh Botanic Garden is a botanical garden located in Collier Township and North Fayette Township, near Pittsburgh, Pennsylvania. Covering 460 acres, it is one of the largest American botanical gardens by area. As of 2025, the garden includes 65 acres of cultivated gardens, woodlands, and walking trails accessible to visitors.

The site, formerly used for coal mining, required extensive environmental remediation before development. The garden operates under a 99-year lease term with Allegheny County at $1 per year. Established by the Horticultural Society of Western Pennsylvania, Pittsburgh Botanic Garden focuses on plants native to or suited for the Allegheny Plateau and temperate climates. It opened to the public on April 1, 2015.

== History ==
Planning for a regional botanical garden in Western Pennsylvania began in 1988, when local horticulturists and landscape architects organized around a long-term horticultural initiative. The Horticultural Society of Western Pennsylvania was formed soon afterward, and the organization was incorporated as a 501(c)(3) nonprofit in 1991.

The garden site includes land formerly associated with the McGill family farm. In 1971, approximately 85 acres were sold to Allegheny County for the expansion of Settlers Cabin Park. In the late 1990s, after a proposed golf course development did not proceed, county officials offered the remaining parcel to the horticultural organization as a potential location for a future botanical garden.

In 1998, Allegheny County granted the Society a 432-acre tract under a renewable 99-year lease. The property, shaped by earlier deep and surface coal mining, presented environmental constraints that influenced planning and early site development.

In 1999, the organization received a Pennsylvania Keystone Grant to support development of a master plan. A master plan made public in 2003 described a phased buildout over approximately two decades and included proposed features such as an adventure garden and treehouse, an orangery, and formal garden spaces intended for events and display collections. Landscape architecture and design work for the plan involved the Pittsburgh-based firm Marshall-Tyler-Rausch, with architectural design by Overland Partners.

Later in 2003, the Society and partners began a cleanup and access improvement effort at the site. The work included removal of dumped debris and abandoned equipment, coordination with Allegheny County on rough grading for an entrance road, and volunteer-led cleanup activities supported by Pennsylvania CleanWays.

In 2010, the organization adopted the name Pittsburgh Botanic Garden. The garden opened the first phase of public access on August 1, 2014, with initial trails and gardens available to visitors, and it transitioned to a full public opening in 2015.

On April 1, 2021, the garden opened a new Welcome Center and related site improvements, expanding visitor services and program capacity and consolidating arrival, education, and other functions at the main entrance.

In 2025, Pittsburgh Botanic Garden released a new master plan outlining a long-term framework for development over the following 25 years. The plan identified priorities for phased expansion of gardens, educational facilities, and support infrastructure, while accounting for site constraints related to topography, prior agricultural and mining activity, and available utilities. It also emphasized conservation planning and ecological assessment to guide future development and protect sensitive natural resources.

== Environmental Restoration ==
=== Water Treatment ===
Early development of the land into a botanic garden was shaped by several major environmental challenges, including subsurface coal, acid mine drainage, and abandoned oil wells. In 2004, flooding from Hurricane Ivan exacerbated these issues dramatically. The storm dropped more than six inches of rain in a short period, causing the abandoned coal mines underneath the site to overflow. The floodwaters carried acid runoff and sediment, triggering landslides and turning local streams orange with heavy metal contamination. These events highlighted the need for extensive reclamation and stormwater management solutions.

Room and pillar coal mining left large underground cavities across parts of the site, making the land susceptible to water collection and acid mine drainage. Environmental studies determined that daylighting the mines by excavating remaining coal and collapsing the voids was an appropriate remediation method for the southern portion of the property. Pittsburgh Botanic Garden partnered with contractors to extract the coal, stabilize the land, and prevent future subsidence and runoff.

Following this effort, reforestation began in 2015 and concluded in 2020. Before planting, the site was graded into furrows to support healthy tree root development. A diverse mix of native species was selected for their drought tolerance and ecological value. Nut-bearing trees such as Quercus spp. (oak), Juglans nigra (black walnut), and Carya ovata (shagbark hickory) were planted to provide future wildlife habitat.

Additionally, The American Chestnut Foundation donated 100 blight-resistant Castanea dentata (American chestnut) seedlings. Other native trees such as Acer spp. (maples), Cercis canadensis (eastern redbud), and Sambucus canadensis (elderberry) were added, with uneven planting patterns to mimic natural forest conditions. In total, more than 16,000 seedlings were planted by volunteers and staff.

In 2012, a passive acid mine drainage treatment was installed to restore the Woodland (Lotus) Pond, and a 400,000 gallon underground cistern was constructed. Combined with three irrigation ponds, the garden can store over 2 million gallons of water annually.

== Facilities ==
=== Woodland Landscapes ===
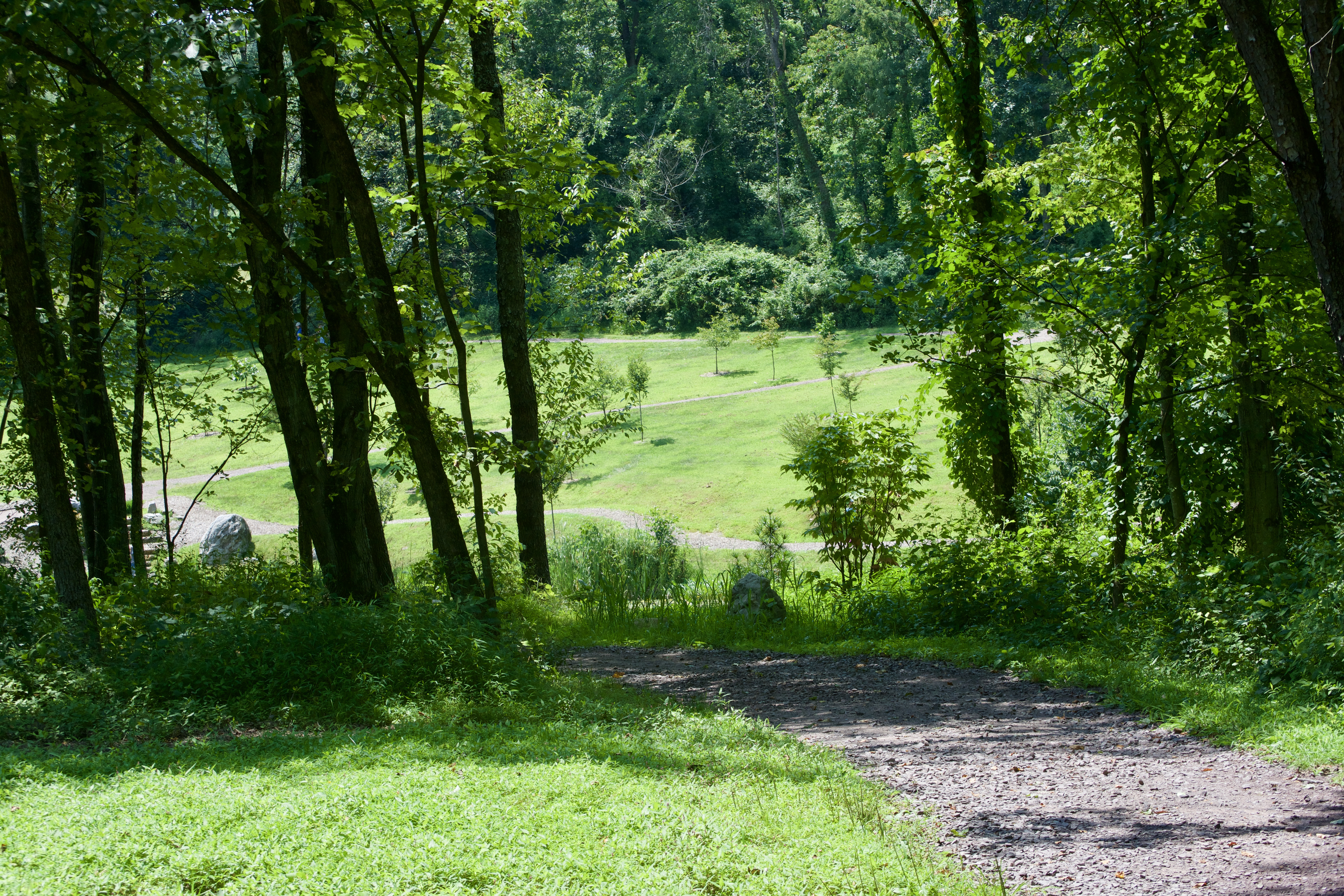

The garden includes several geographically themed woodland areas and display gardens, each designed to showcase the native and culturally significant plant species of their respective regions:

- Allegheny Plateau Woodland
- European Woodland
- Asian Woodland
- Margaret Lawrence Simon Dogwood Meadow
- Hillside Pollinator Garden
- Garden of the Five Senses
- Celebration Garden

=== Phase One ===
The groundbreaking ceremony for the garden took place on August 1, 2006. The garden opened for a short window to the public on August 1, 2014 through September. The garden fully opened to the public on April 1, 2015. Phase One of development was completed by 2015 at a cost of $30 million, introducing 60 acres of trails, gardens, and interactive features.

Key attractions included the Woodlands of the World, a 40-acre landscape featuring five geographically themed forest gardens: Appalachian Plateau and Cove Forest, Eastern European Forest (with a 25-foot cob dragon sculpture), English Woodland, Asian Woodland with a lotus pond, and a planned Japanese Garden designed by Keiji Uesugi.

The initial development also included a Family Garden with play areas, and the present-day Margaret L. Simon Dogwood Meadow, home to over 550 native flowering dogwood trees and wildflowers, supported by the Garden Club of Allegheny County.

=== Welcome Center ===
The Welcome Center opened on April 1, 2021, six years after the garden's public opening. The 7,500-square-foot building was designed by Overland Partners in collaboration with local firm FortyEighty Architecture, with site and landscape design by Pashek + MTR. It serves as the main entrance and includes visitor services, administrative offices, classrooms, and spaces for public programs and events.

The facility includes a reception desk, gift shop, café, restrooms, and several multi-purpose rooms used for education and rentals. The Peirce Education Room opens onto a courtyard garden set into the hillside, and the Zappala Woodland Room offers indoor seating with views of the surrounding forest. Both the Woodland Room and the café feature floor-to-ceiling windows, while the café also includes a terrace overlooking the surrounding tree canopy.

The building was constructed using natural materials such as cedar cladding and local sandstone, and is oriented to take advantage of daylight. Outdoor features include the Entry Garden, planted with hornbeam, ferns, and woodland perennials, and the All Seasons Garden, a hillside landscape with rhododendrons, azaleas, and dwarf conifers.

Adjacent to the building is the Auto Garden, a landscaped parking area that houses a 177,000-gallon underground stormwater system. The system collects runoff from about seven acres and releases it gradually to reduce erosion and flooding. Stone removed during excavation was reused as decorative outcrops.

The Welcome Center supports the garden’s education and outreach efforts, including STEAM-focused field trips, workshops, and restoration-themed programming tied to the site’s coal mining history.

=== Davidson Events Center ===
Initially, the garden operated out of the Bayer Welcome Center, a restored 1870s American chestnut barn that previously served as the Settlers Cabin Park maintenance center. In 2021, with the opening of the new Welcome Center, the barn was renamed the Davidson Events Center and repurposed as a venue for private rentals. It now hosts weddings, corporate gatherings, and community events.

=== Historic Homestead ===
The garden preserves the late 18th century Walker-Ewing-Glass Log House, the namesake of Settlers Cabin Park. Nearby, a pioneer garden, chicken coop, and a former sheep barn (now used for storage) are maintained as part of the historic homestead area.

An Heirloom Apple Orchard features historic varieties, including the Spitzenberg, a cultivar reported to be the favorite of Thomas Jefferson. Volunteers installed split-rail fencing to protect the young trees.

The garden's administrative offices are located in a building constructed on the foundation of an 1855 farmhouse, located near the Heritage Homestead.

=== Reforestation and Habitat Restoration ===
Since 2010, more than 20 acres have been cleared of invasive species. Over 5,200 native trees, shrubs, and perennials have been planted with the help of volunteers to restore ecological diversity.

=== Water Management ===
A passive water treatment system installed in 2012 neutralizes acid mine drainage using a limestone filtration bed. Water passes through a 24,000 gallon drainable tank and settling pond before reaching the Woodland Pond, now home to amphibians, insects, and birds.

== See also ==
- List of botanical gardens in the United States
