= Palmer Bikeway =

American system of trails in Pennsylvania

Coordinates: 40.723439°N 75.247332°W

- Length: 7.8 mi (12.6 km)
- Location: Palmer Township, Pennsylvania, U.S.
- Trailheads: Riverview and Fairview Parks
- Use: Jogging, walking, biking, dog walking
- Difficulty: Easy to moderate, level terrain, ADA accessible
- Surface: Blacktop

The Palmer Bikeway is a system of trails in Palmer Township, Pennsylvania. These include a towpath adjacent to the Lehigh River, along with extensions that go up through residential areas of the township.

The bikeway is connected to other trails which extend into the cities of Easton and Bethlehem, and proceeds through a corner of Wilson. The northern portion of the trail, which extends from Penn Pump Park to Tatamy Borough parallel to the Bushkill Creek, will eventually be linked to the rest of the Bikeway via an unbuilt section between Northwood Avenue at Penn Pump Park and Bushkill Park Drive just northeast of Bushkill Park.

Once an undeveloped portion of trail between Tatamy and Stockertown is completed, the Palmer Bikeway will connect with the Plainfield Township Trail, creating a regional trail system.

== Historical development ==
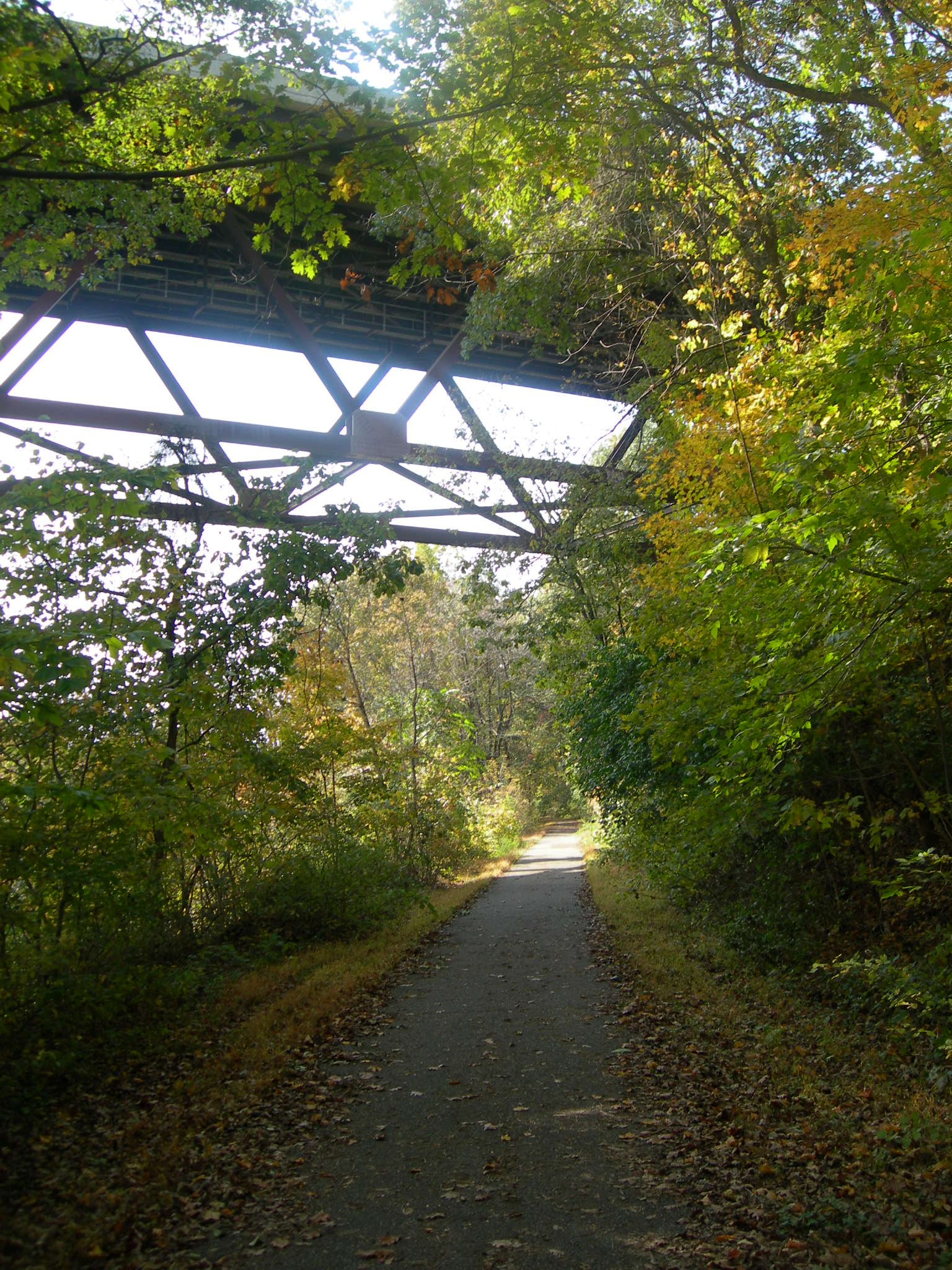
Palmer Bikeway passing under PA Route 33 at the Lehigh River Bridge

=== Initial construction ===
The original idea for the Palmer Bikeway first came about in the late 1970s as a result of a United States Department of the Interior program to create walking and bicycle trails from many abandoned rail lines across the nation. Under the leadership of officials from Palmer and Bethlehem Townships the project received a grant of $480,400, the second largest grant under the program.

=== 2000–2010 ===
In 2001, the township received additional grant money for the completion of a three-mile section of the trail along the Bushkill Creek in the northern section of the township. This section goes north from Penn Pump Park to the township's border with Tatamy. In 2002, following the completion of the Rt. 33 extension, a two-mile section of path was completed west of Riverview Park along the Lehigh River. This section eliminated the need to traverse the steep grades from Chain Dam Road when traveling from Riverview Park.

=== 2011 and beyond ===
As additional funding becomes available the recently completed 3-mile section will be connected to the original 7.8-mile path. Additional connections to other local trails in Wilson, Plainfield and Forks townships will be made.

== Along the trail ==
=== Design ===
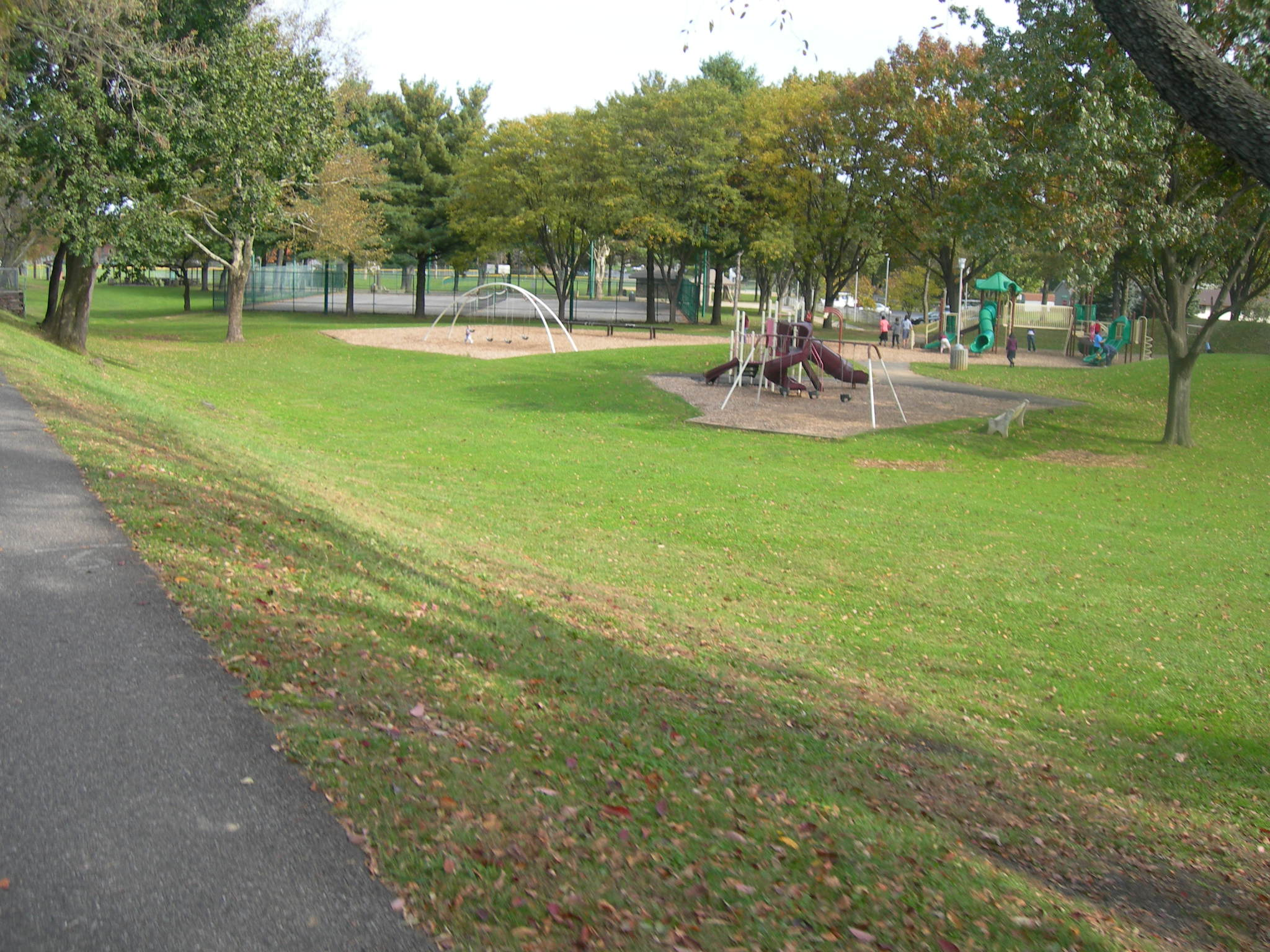
Fairview Park seen from the Palmer Bikeway

The entire 7.8-mile length of the bike path is paved with asphalt and with the exception of a 1.5-mile section along Chain Dam Road the trail also occupies its own right of way. The trail ranges from 8–12 feet wide and is relatively level. There are two steep grades, however, at both ends of Chain Dam Road. Near the southern terminus, the trail runs along the Lehigh River for several miles. As the bike path loops north around PA Rt 33 it runs through several residential neighborhoods and crosses five public roads at grade.

=== Maintenance ===
The Bike Path is owned by Bethlehem and Palmer townships and is maintained year-round by the Palmer Township Parks Department. Local community groups will occasionally sponsor improvements to the trail as well, such as a recent Eagle Scout project to place clearly visible mile markers along the main section of the bike path.

=== Amenities ===
The trail passes through two public parks, both of which contain bathrooms, picnic facilities, playground equipment, and parking. There is another parking lot and a public boat launch accessible from Hope Rd.

== See also ==
- Pennsylvania Rail Trails
- Plainfield Township Trail
