= Panhandle Railroad =

Panhandle Railroad or Panhandle Railway may refer to:

- Pittsburgh, Cincinnati, Chicago and St. Louis Railroad across the Northern Panhandle of West Virginia
  - Pan Handle Railway (1861–1868), a predecessor of the above in Pennsylvania and West Virginia
- Pan Handle Railroad (1868–1871), a predecessor of Pennsylvania Railroad subsidiary Pittsburgh, Wheeling and Kentucky Railroad in West Virginia
- Panhandle Railway (1887–1898), a predecessor of Atchison, Topeka and Santa Fe Railway subsidiary Panhandle and Santa Fe Railway in Texas
- Panhandle and Santa Fe Railway

== See also ==
- Panhandle Trail
