= Panhandle Trail =

Rail trail in Pennsylvania and West Virginia

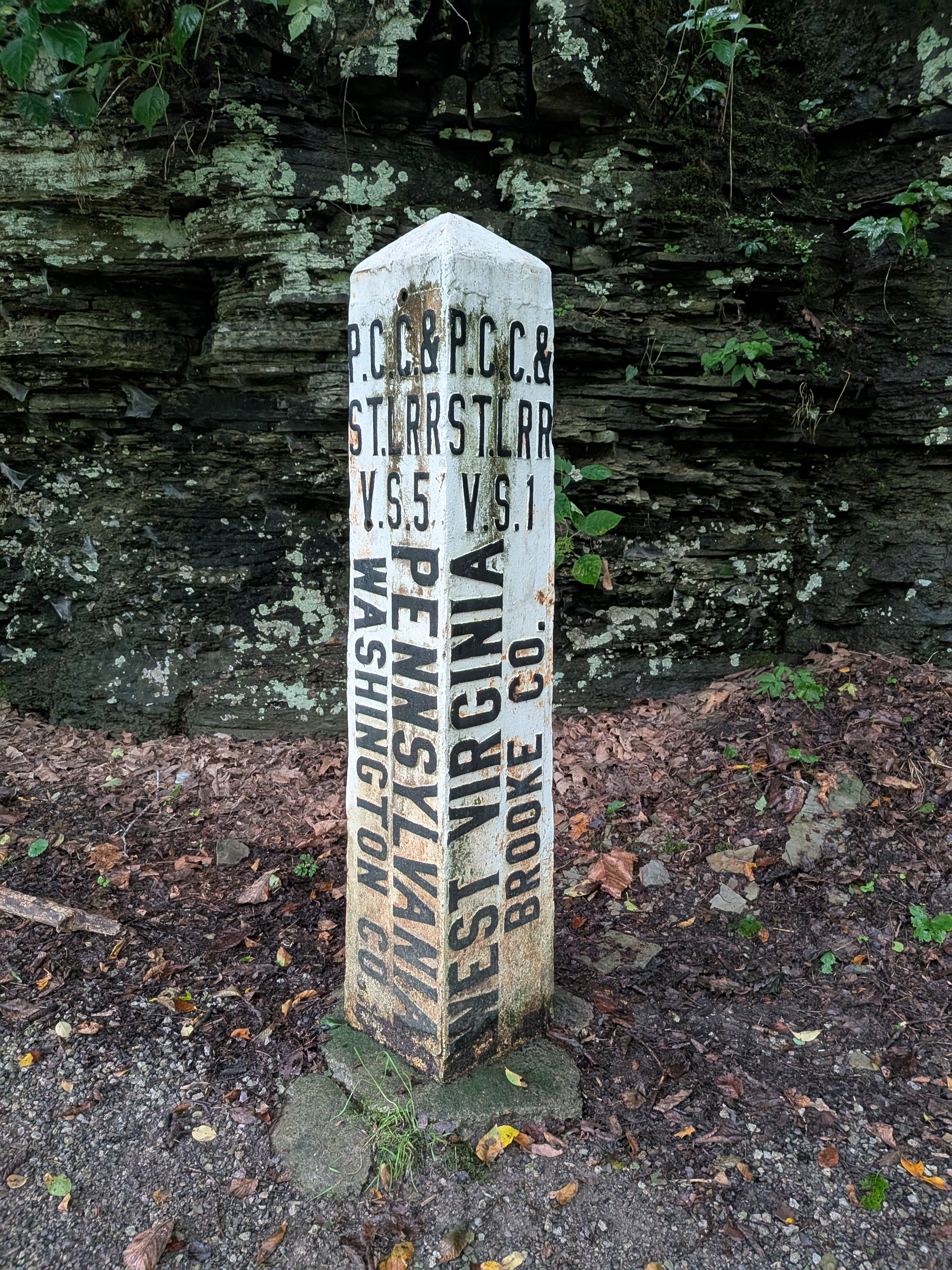
- This marker denotes where Pennsylvania and West Virginia meet along the Panhandle Trail.
- Length: 29 mi (47 km)
- Location: Allegheny County / Washington County, Pennsylvania and Brooke County, West Virginia, USA
- Trailheads: Walkers Mill, Pennsylvania; 40°23′45″N 80°07′55″W; Weirton, West Virginia; 40°24′03″N 80°34′55″W
- Use: Multi-use
- Difficulty: Easy
- Season: Year-round
- Hazards: Rough terrain from Burgettstown, Pennsylvania to the Pennsylvania/West Virginia state line
Trail map

The Panhandle Trail is a rail trail in southern Pennsylvania and the Northern Panhandle of West Virginia. It occupies an abandoned Conrail railroad corridor that had been known as the Panhandle route which has been converted to a bicycle and walking trail. The line between Walkers Mill and Weirton was closed in 1995, and the tracks were removed the following year in 1996. The original section of the trail is the West Virginia section, where the trail was called the Harmon Creek Trail, for the adjacent Harmon Creek. When Pennsylvania built its section, both states agreed to call it the Panhandle Trail. Although the Panhandle Trail occupies 29 miles of the Panhandle Route, the remaining portion of the route is owned by the Pittsburgh and Ohio Central Railroad, but it is no longer used.

== History ==
The rail trail follows the same route as the former Panhandle Division of the Pennsylvania Railroad that connected Pittsburgh to St. Louis and gives the trail its name. It is part of the government funded “Rails to Trails” project. The first mile of the trail officially opened on October 29, 2000. About five months later on March 15, 2001, a group of volunteers was chosen to serve as the Panhandle Trail Association. Their purpose was to establish and manage the passage that would eventually link the Panhandle Trail to the larger Montour Trail. In January 2007 the connector was completed. Though the entire trail is accessible, the trail is paved from McDonald to the Pennsylvania/West Virginia state line.

== Organizations ==
The Collier Friends of the Panhandle Trail is an organization that manages a 2.4 miles (3.9 km) portion of the trail beginning at Walkers Mill. Another organization is the Montour Trail Council, who is in charge of a 6.8 miles (10.9 km) section in Allegheny County.

== Location ==
The Panhandle Trail runs 29 miles (47 km) beginning at the Walkers Mill station in Walker's Mill, Pennsylvania and ending in an area near Weirton, West Virginia. It passes many towns beginning in Harmon Creek and including Colliers, Hanlin, Dinsmore, Burgetstown, Joffre, Bulger, Midway, McDonald, Sturgeon, Noblestown, Oakdale, Rennerdale, and finally Walkers Mill. At the 8.62 miles (13.87 km) mark near McDonald, a one-mile connector links the Panhandle to the larger Montour trail.

== Activities ==
The relatively flat trail is covered with crushed limestone, while much of the trail in Washington county is paved. This makes the trail suitable for walking, running, biking, horseback riding, and cross country skiing; however, motorized vehicles are prohibited. The Collier Friends of the Panhandle Trail host special events such as the annual Night Walk in October and "Rock the Quarry" which is a two-day festival in the fall that includes music, food, and games.

== Stations and amenities ==
There are stations and special areas that serve as access points and provide parking places and also features like permanent restrooms, portable restrooms, shelter houses, picnic tables, vending machines, water fountains, maps, bike racks, and bulletin boards that provide event notifications and maps. In between these areas, many benches as well as a few portable restrooms and picnic tables have been placed along the trail. Nearly every mile has at least four benches (one at every quarter mile) and some have even more. The access points are located at the following places:

- Walkers Mill Station - Found in Walkers Mill, Pennsylvania this station is the beginning of the trail and provides parking, a picnic shelter, benches, a water fountain, a bulletin board and a portable restroom.
- Rennerdale Station - About .6 miles (0.97 km) into the trail in Rennerdale, Pennsylvania the station has parking, a picnic shelter and a bulletin board.
- Gregg Station - Located at the 2.4 miles (3.9 km) mark in Oakdale, Pennsylvania the station also has parking, a picnic shelter, portables restrooms, and a bulletin board.
  - Settler's Cabin Park connector - This partially complete (in 2015) trail connects to the nearby Settler's Cabin Park.
- Oakdale Station - Also in Oakdale at mile 3.75, the station offers parking, picnic tables, a bike rack and a water fountain.
- Sturgeon - At the 5.75 miles (9.25 km) mark in Sturgeon, Pennsylvania there is an area with available parking, permanent restrooms, vending machines, a shelter house and a bulletin board.
- McDonald Trail Station - This station in McDonald, Pennsylvania at mile 7.25 is special because it is near the intersection of the Montour and Panhandle trails. The station offers parking, restrooms, an information center, trails maps, vending machines, a large map of the trail and McDonald and picnic tables.
- Village of Primrose - Located at mile 8.75 in Primrose, Pennsylvania there is an area with a parking lot, portable restroom, bulletin board and trail map.
- Midway - Around mile ten in Midway, Pennsylvania there is a parking area and bulletin board.
- Bulger - At mile 13.5, a small village with a veterans memorial.
- Burgettstown - Trail Station, restrooms, Gift Shop, Walden's Restaurant
- Dinsmore Road - In Burgettstown, Pennsylvania where Dinsmore Road crosses the trail around the 19th mile, parking is available as well as a bulletin board.
- Colliers West Virginia - At mile 22.25 in Colliers, West Virginia parking, benches, a picnic table and a bulletin board are available.
- Harmon Creek - The final access point is at the 28.5-mile (45.9 km) mark in Harmon Creek, West Virginia where there is a parking lot, some benches, a picnic table a bulletin board.

== See also ==
- Collier Township, Pennsylvania
- Hancock County, West Virginia
- Ohio River Trail
- List of rail trails
