= Beaver River Trail =

Coordinates: 40.757°N 80.311°W

- Length: 1.4 mi (2.3 km)
- Location: Beaver Falls, Pennsylvania, USA
- Trailheads: Beaver Falls, Pennsylvania
- Use: Hiking, Biking
- Difficulty: Easy
- Season: Year-round

The Beaver River Trail is a rail trail located in the city of Beaver Falls, Pennsylvania, United States. As of 2011, the trail is about 1.4-mile (2.3 km) long.

== History ==
The Beaver River Trail was built over an old right-of-way of the now defunct Pittsburgh and Lake Erie Railroad in downtown Beaver Falls. The line was bypassed for a newer route closer to the Beaver River and was abandoned, along with many industrial plants that were served by the railroad. Phase I of the trail was completed in 2006, with Phase II being completed in 2010.

== The Trail ==
The northern segment of the trail runs below Geneva College using a portion of the Marginal Railroad's right-of-way. The trail terminates just south of the college's rugby field where the P&LE's College Hill Yard was located. The southern portion's northern terminus is at 23rd Street, just below the Eastvale Bridge. The trail runs for about a mile til it terminates at 11th Street.

== Future extension ==
There are still ongoing developments for the trail. An important goal is to connect the two portions of the trail below the Eastvale Bridge and across from the College Hill Station. The northern leg will eventually connect with the North Country Trail near Wampum. A spur route to Bradys Run Park is currently in the works. The ultimate goal is to connect to other rail trails in the area: north to Erie and south to the proposed Ohio River Trail and the Montour Trail.
