= Ohio River Trail =

Trail system in Maryland, Pennsylvania, Ohio, and West Virginia, US

Ohio River Trail Council
- Formation: May 26, 2009
- Type: Not-for-profit
- Legal status: 501(c)(3)-registered charity
- Headquarters: Monaca, Pennsylvania
- Website: Ohio River Trail Council

The Ohio River Trail is composed of two trails: The Ohio Water Trail and the Ohio River Greenway Trail. The Ohio River Greenway Trail (ORGT) is a proposed route that would interconnect existing trails in Maryland, Pennsylvania, Ohio and West Virginia. The proposal is spearheaded by the Ohio River Trail Council (ORTC), a volunteer-led, non-profit organization. The ORTC is an Internal Revenue Service registered 501(c)(3) not-for-profit organization which relies on corporate, foundation, government, and private grants and donations to achieve its stated mission of creating a multi-use trail along the Ohio River and its tributaries. The Council is headquartered in Monaca, Pennsylvania.

== History ==
The Ohio River Trail Project was conceptualized on January 2, 2009, in coordination with Beaver County Planning Commission's Shared Greenways & Environmental Planner Doniele Andrus; the Borough of Monaca Manager Mario Leone Jr; and Vincent Troia.

On May 26, 2009, the Ohio River Trail Council (ORTC) was incorporated by Troia and Mario Leone, for the purpose of establishing a multi-use trail along the Ohio River to promote the growth in River & Trail towns of recreation, health, wellness, transportation, cultural and historical amenities, education, charity, the protection and conservation of natural resources and to stimulate the local economies. The Trail and its proposed connections were conceived by Troia.

The Ohio River Trail Council began as a grass-roots effort to support a progressing state and national movement to develop greenways, especially since 1987 when President Reagan's Commission on "American Outdoors" recommended establishing a national greenways network. Pennsylvania's statewide greenways program was established by Governor Tom Ridge in 2001 to promote and support the greenway efforts occurring in all sixty-seven counties.

== Proposed trails ==
The Ohio River Greenway Trail is proposed to run from the Point of Beginning (mile marker zero) at the OH-PA-WV state line near the Little Beaver Creek Greenway Trail, a segment of the Great Ohio Lake-to-River Greenway, to the Beaver River Trail, the Chesapeake and Ohio Canal Trail via the Montour Trail in Moon Township, Pennsylvania, the Three Rivers Heritage Trail in Pittsburgh and the Great Allegheny Passage. The proposed ORT is a critical and missing link to nationally significant trail linkages in the tri-state area and is intended to become an important segment in a "mega-trail" from the Great Lakes region, through to Washington, D.C.

In addition to the Tri-state Greenway, the ORTC also supports that the Ohio River Trail serve as part of the U.S. Bicycle Route System Route 50 and the Adventure Cycling Association Underground Railroad, Pittsburgh spur. The Ohio River Trail corridor is part of the National Park Service Rivers of Steel National Heritage Area.

The Ohio River Trail is intended to improve the quality of life of its users by providing fitness and recreation opportunities. In addition, the ORT can serve as an alternative transportation corridor between communities, as well as reducing vehicle congestion and pollution. Plans also exist to enable the disabled to comfortably make use of the trail. The project includes the reallocation of abandoned rail corridors, bridges, interurban or trolley lines, and canal towpaths as public multi-use trails. An emphasis exists on showcasing and preserving historical and cultural sites along the trail, alongside the establishment of an Ohio River Trail Museum and endorsement of the revitalization of the surrounding area.

The Trail is composed of 31 Western Pennsylvania communities.

There are twelve Ohio River North Shore communities: Glasgow, Ohioville, Midland, Industry, Vanport Township, Beaver, Bridgewater, Fallston, New Brighton, Rochester, and Rochester Township.

In addition, the Ohio River North Shore Extension includes the eight communities of Ambridge, Baden, Edgeworth, Freedom, Glen Osborne, Harmony Township, Leetsdale, and Sewickley. The Bradys Run Extension adds Patterson Township and Brighton Township.

There are also ten Ohio River South Shore communities: Monaca, Center Township, Aliquippa, Hopewell Township, South Heights, Crescent Township, Moon Township, Coraopolis, and Montour Junction. Neville Township is the tenth community with the extension over the Neville Island Bridge.

The Ohio River Trail Council has also proposed and developed the Ohio River Water Trail. The Ohio River Water Trail consists of canoe, kayak and rowing access to the Ohio River and its tributaries. Presently the Little Beaver Creek has access at Lock 57 Park in Ohioville, the Ohio River has access at Monaca, and the Beaver River has access at Bridgewater & Rochester's Riverfront Park. The ORTC supports the design, construction and the installation of a kayak and canoe launch site in these areas with amenities including signage and a canoe/kayak storage rack.

The project is expected to bring economic boons to Western Pennsylvania through the growth of the construction and maintenance industries, in addition to tourism-related opportunities such as rafting tours, bicycle sales and rentals, restaurants, and lodging.

== Current status ==
The campaign to build the rail trail that will eventually link Lake Erie with Washington, D.C., via Beaver County has progressed to the point that the organizers, Vincent Troia and Mario Leone, are prepared to display their work. In an interview with Beaver County Times journalist Michael Pound regarding the status of the Ohio River Trail Project, the pair stated they have successfully solicited resolutions of support from the Beaver County communities, through which the South Shore Trail would pass, and that they will soon have similar resolutions from the Allegheny County communities.

The cost of the South Shore feasibility study is estimated at $50,000. Leone and Troia stated that the not-for-profit organization has already put together sufficient money for the match required for a grant from the Pennsylvania Department of Conservation and Natural Resources (DCNR). The feasibility study has been awarded to Stromberg, Garrigan & Associates, and it is estimated to require six to ten months to complete.

On January 6, 2010, the Ohio River Trail South Shore feasibility study began with a project steering committee meeting. The feasibility study for the south shore is expected to be completed in the spring of 2011 at a projected cost of $50,000.

On June 12, 2010, the "Plant a Wish" project took place at the Point of Beginning. The project was intended to raise awareness of the Ohio River Trail effort, with participants from Ohio, Pennsylvania and West Virginia writing down their wishes on pieces of paper, which were then buried beneath the site of a newly planted tree. It is hoped that the Point of Beginning will also host the beginning of a bike trail that would run up the Ohio River and conclude at Montour Creek.

On July 28, 2010, the Council was awarded a $10,000 grant by the Port of Pittsburgh Commission on the understanding that it will be used to develop blueways and build bike and canoe racks at points in Rochester, Monaca, Bridgewater, and Ohioville.

The cost of the North Shore feasibility study is estimated at $56,000. On October 14, 2010, the Pennsylvania DCNR awarded the Ohio River Trail a $29,000 grant for the North Shore Feasibility Study. The North Shore Feasibility Study began in January 2011.

On October 15, 2010 the Ohio River Trail Council (ORTC) and its partner the Borough of Monaca, PA along with three of its partner municipalities, Aliquippa, Coraopolis and Midland has received a grant for a $150,000 United States Environmental Protection Agency (EPA) Brownfields Area-Wide Planning Program Grant and Assistance to advance our ongoing regional brownfields revitalization. These municipalities have joined to undertake a grass-roots effort to re-think the future of our communities as a way to overcome the loss of a major portion of our manufacturing base and the post-industrial brownfields legacy that remains from that loss.

On October 25, 2010, the National Park Service (NPS) Rivers, Trails, and Conservation (RTCA) Program approved an application for a technical assistance grant for the Ohio River Trail Council. Over the next year, the NPS Rivers & Trails staff will assist the ORTC with the completion of a Feasibility Study and to expand public involvement in the project. Efforts are underway to communicate and collaborate with other trail groups, and to establish a Tri-State Trail Alliance in order to increase visibility and success of each smaller trail component of a greater linking trail system. Through the RTCA Program, the NPS helps communities and neighborhoods improve their important local resources, protect river resources, develop new trails and greenways and create and manage open space.

"In September of 2010, a planning grant was awarded to the Friends of the Riverfront to begin an effort to connect the Three Rivers Heritage Trail from the City of Pittsburgh to Coraopolis. This eight mile segment will traverse through the City of Pittsburgh, McKees Rocks, Stowe Township, Moon Township, Neville Township and Coraopolis. This effort will complement the work of the Ohio River Trail Council and Lawrence and Beaver Counties, which have completed trail feasibility work outside of Allegheny County. Once feasibility work from the City of Pittsburgh to Coraopolis is complete, we will have a good understanding of the opportunity for trail development along the Ohio River all the way to Ohio. In Ohio, groups are working to connect to our trail here in Pennsylvania. You will see a lot more activity along the Ohio River in 2011."

The South Shore Feasibility Study which began on Jan 6, 2010, was completed in March 2011. The resultant Ohio River South Shore Trail is approximately 15.6 miles from Monaca to the beginning of the Montour Trail.

In 2011, the first year of assistance from the NPS, the RTCA assisted with the development of the Ohio River Water Trail and the Ohio River Land Trail feasibility studies. In addition, the RTCA supported the ORTC in a multi-state effort, which included eighteen counties in three states to link a system of trails in Ohio, Pennsylvania and West Virginia. On March 29, 2011 a Tri-state Trail Alliance meeting of 80 trail advocates and on October 13, 2011 a regional trails meeting hosted by the Power of 32 occurred to support the vision of linking a system of trails in the tri-state area.

On October 25, 2010, the National Park Service (NPS) Rivers, Trails, and Conservation (RTCA) Program awarded a second year of technical assistance to the Ohio River Trail Council. In 2012, the NPS Rivers & Trails staff will focus on identifying an on-the-ground section of the Ohio River Land/Water Trail to develop and continue the oversight for the Tri-State Trail Initiative.

On April 6, 2011 the ORTC received a second grant from the Port of Pittsburgh Commission to establish a small watercraft launch in Beaver Falls, Pennsylvania.

On October 26, 2011 the National Park Service approved the Ohio River Trail Council's application for a second year of technical assistance from the Rivers, Trails and Conservation Assistance Program. In the first year of assistance, RTCA assisted the Ohio River Trail Council (ORTC) with the development of the Ohio River Water Trail and the Ohio River Land Trail Feasibility Studies. In addition, the RTCA helped coordinate the March 29, 2011 Tri-state Trail Alliance meeting of about 80 trail advocates, and the October 13, 2011 regional trails meeting hosted by the Power of 32, to support the vision of linking a system of trails in Ohio, Pennsylvania and West Virginia. In 2012, the NPS Rivers & Trails staff will focus on identifying an on-the-ground section of the Ohio River Land/Water Trail to develop, and continue the oversight for the Tri-State Trail Initiative, a multi-state effort which includes eighteen counties in three states. The Pennsylvania counties include Beaver, Crawford, Erie, Greene, Lawrence, Mercer and Washington. The Ohio Counties include Ashtabula, Belmont, Columbiana, Jefferson, Mahoning, Monroe and Trumbull. The West Virginia counties include Brooke, Hancock, Marshall and Ohio.

On December 5, 2011 the Ohio River Trail Council, Beaver County Planning Commission and Midland hosted a public hearing regarding the feasibility study of a bicycle and pedestrian trail along the north side of the Ohio River. The proposed trail would connect with the planned Ohio River South Shore Trail at the Monaca-Rochester Bridge and continue to the Ohio-West Virginia state line.

== See also ==
- Abandoned Pennsylvania Turnpike
- Beaver River Trail
- East Coast Greenway
- Great Allegheny Passage
- Lower Trail, Pennsylvania
- Montour Trail
- North Country Trail
- Ohio to Erie Trail
- Panhandle Trail
- Rails-to-Trails Conservancy
- Rails with trails
- Three Rivers Heritage Trail
- Youghiogheny River Trail
