= Ohio River Water Trail =

American water trail

- Length: 69 mile (111 km)
- Location: Pennsylvania, Ohio and West Virginia, United States
- Designation: National Recreation Trail (2015) 69 miles (111 km)
- Trailheads: 19
- Use: Canoeing, boating (motorized), kayaking, paddle boarding, rafting, rowing, sailing, and fishing
- Difficulty: Moderate to strenuous
- Season: Spring to fall
- Sights: Ohio River Valley
- Hazards: 3 locks and dams, severe weather, Class II, III white water
- Website: www.water.ohiorivertrail.org

The Ohio River Water Trail is a water trail which navigates the counties of Allegheny, Beaver, Columbiana, and Hancock in the states of Ohio, Pennsylvania, and West Virginia. The trail is under the stewardship of the Ohio River Trail Council. The blueway geographically extends from the Three Rivers Water Trail in Pittsburgh, Pennsylvania, to Newell, West Virginia, and East Liverpool, Ohio. The 69-mile Ohio River Water Trail (ORWT) includes 13 miles of the Ohio River along the Three Rivers Water Trail from "The Point" in Pittsburgh at milepost zero downstream to the Dashields Lock and Dam at milepost 13, 33 miles of the Ohio River from Dashields Dam at milepost 13, downstream to Newell at milepost 46.0, 16 miles of the Little Beaver Creek to Beaver Creek State Park, three miles of the Beaver River to the Townsend (Fallston) Dam, and four miles of the Raccoon Creek.

== History ==
The Ohio River Water Trail was conceived and developed by Dr. Vincent Troia, Executive Director of the Ohio River Trail Council. The Ohio River Water Trail project originated in 2010 to develop a dedicated safe route for boats that provides a destination for canoeing, kayaking, fishing, small motorized watercraft, and other recreation. These routes establish recreational corridors between specific locations and can include boat launches and access points, day-use sites, and in some cases overnight camping.

The Ohio River Water Trail project's goal was to connect Pittsburgh, Pa to its neighboring communities along the Ohio River while building a sense of place and offering an enormous opportunity for recreation for the 1.6 million residents living along the Ohio River Water Trail in southwest Pennsylvania. To that end, the Ohio River Trail Council specifically focused on establishing four access points for canoes and kayaks: One on the Ohio River in Monaca, two into the Beaver River in Rochester and Bridgewater, and one into Little Beaver Creek at Lock 57 Community Park in Ohioville.

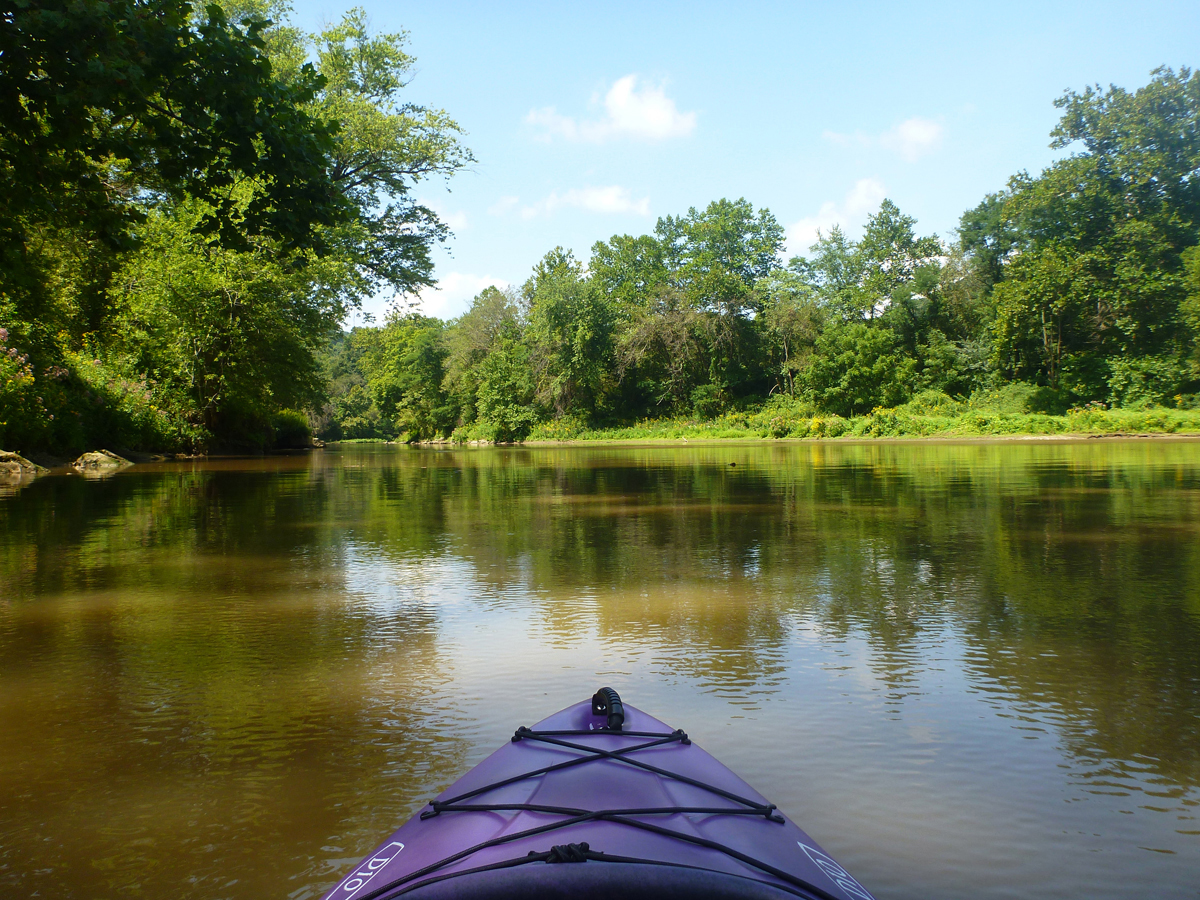
Ohio River Water Trail

== Map & Guide ==
The Ohio River Water Trail Map and Guide is available on the Ohio River Trail and the Pennsylvania Fish & Boat Commission websites.

== Pennsylvania Water Trail ==
On January 4, 2012, the Ohio River Water Trail received the Pennsylvania designation as an official state water trail by the Pennsylvania Water Trails Partnership. The members of the partnership include the Pennsylvania Department of Conservation and Natural Resources, Pennsylvania Environmental Council, Pennsylvania Fish & Boat Commission, National Park Service – Chesapeake Bay Gateways & Watertrails Network, and the National Park Service Rivers, Trails & Conservation Assistance Program. Each water trail is unique, a reflection of Pennsylvania's diverse geology, ecology and communities.

== National Recreation Trail ==
The Ohio River Water Trail was designated as a National Recreation Trail (NRT) on June 4, 2015. NRT is a designation given to trails that contribute to the health, conservation, and recreation goals in the United States. Over 1,148 trails in all 50 U.S. states, available for public use and ranging from less than a mile to 485 miles (781 km) in length, have been designated as NRTs on federal, state, municipal, and privately owned lands. The National Park Service jointly administers the NRT program in conjunction with a number of federal and not-for-profit partners, notably American Trails, which hosts the NRT website.

== See also ==
- Canoe
- Georgetown Island
- Kayak
- Ohio River
- Ohio River Islands National Wildlife Refuge
- Phillis Island
- Waterway
