= Walker-Ewing Log House =

Log house in Pennsylvania, USA

- U.S. National Register of Historic Places
- Pittsburgh Landmark – PHLF
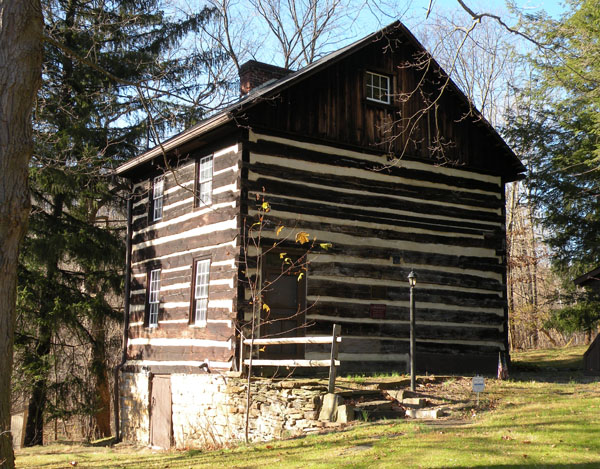

- Location within Pennsylvania Location within the United States
- Location: Northeast of Oakdale on Noblestown Road (east of Pinkerton Run Road) in Collier Township, Allegheny County, Pennsylvania, USA
- Coordinates: 40°24′40.29″N 80°9′36.39″W
- Built: circa 1790
- NRHP reference No.: 76001593

Significant dates
- Added to NRHP: January 30, 1976
- Designated PHLF: 1970

The Walker-Ewing Log House is an historic, eighteenth century loghouse located in Collier Township, Allegheny County, Pennsylvania. Owned and managed by the Pioneers West Historical Society beginning in the 1990s, the home and land were acquired by the Allegheny Land Trust in 2020 with oversight responsibility for the building's preservation and easement given to the Western Pennsylvania Conservancy.

== History ==
Construction on the log cabin began circa 1762 and was completed circa 1790. The home of Gabriel Walker, the structure was built on property that was originally part of a 437-acre tract of land that had been rendered as payment for military service performed during the American Revolution. Archives at the Pioneers West Historical Society hold a copy of an 1817 deed to the property, which had been owned by descendants of the Walker and Ewing families in an unbroken line of transfer for more than two hundred years.

Gabriel Walker, who had relocated with his brother, Isaac Walker, from Lancaster County to Allegheny County sometime prior to the Revolutionary War, fought beside his brother during the war and was subsequently arrested with him in 1794 for involvement in the Whiskey Rebellion. The Ewing family was added to the home's line of owners when Edward Ewing Glass, a descendant of Isaac Walker's daughter and her husband, William Ewing, became involved with the property.

The house, which is located roughly two miles northwest of present-day Rennerdale, Pennsylvania, was added to the National Register of Historic Places on January 30, 1976, and the List of Pittsburgh History and Landmarks Foundation Historic Landmarks in 1970.

As of 2020, the loghouse and land were owned by the Allegheny Land Trust with oversight responsibility for the property's building preservation and conservation easement held by the Western Pennsylvania Conservancy.

== See also ==
- Walker-Ewing-Glass Log House
- Neill Log House
- Wyckoff-Mason House
