= Hoover-Mason Trestle =

Elevated linear park in Bethlehem, Pennsylvania

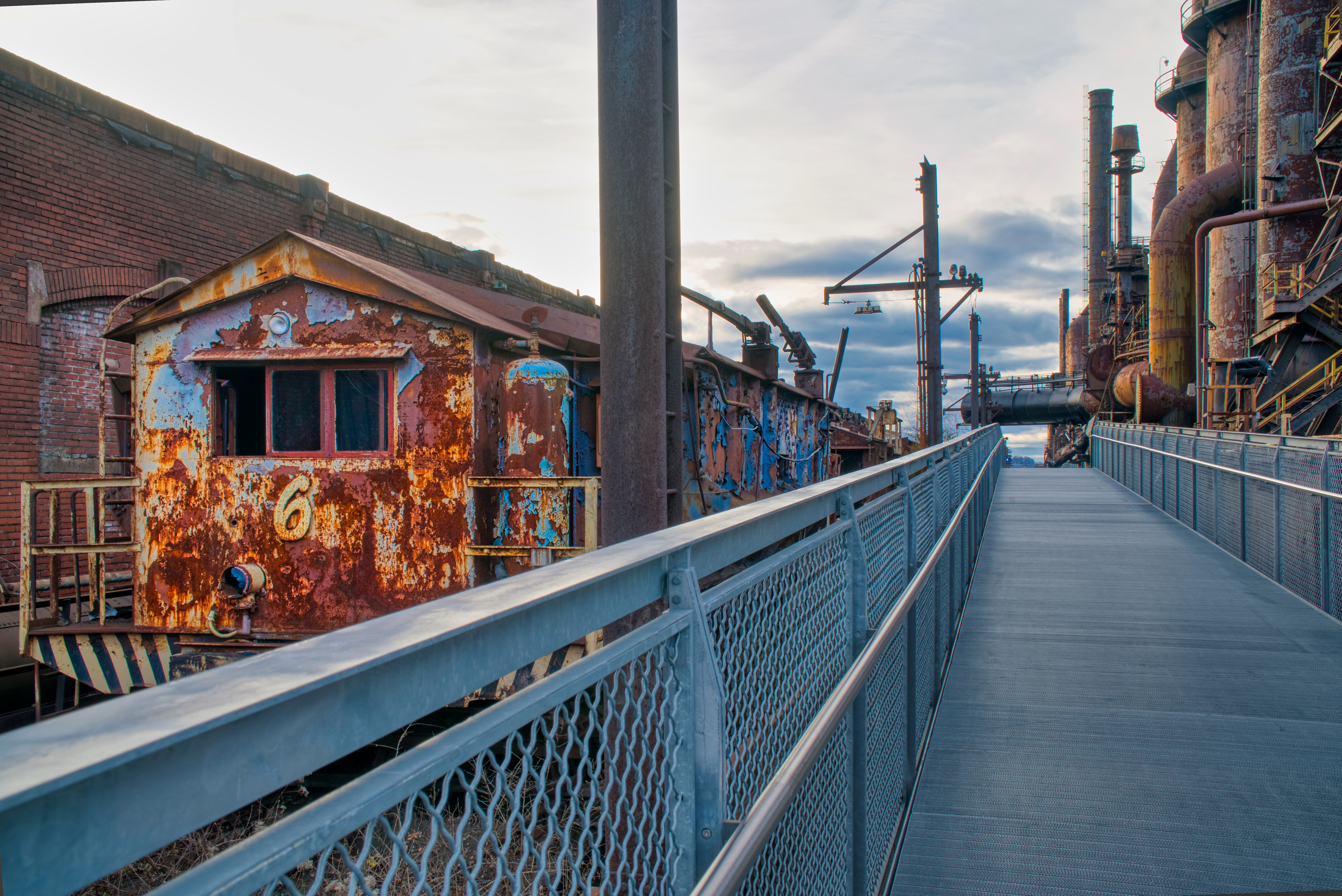
- View from the trestle bridge
- Interactive map of Hoover-Mason Trestle
- Type: Elevated linear park
- Location: Bethlehem, Pennsylvania
- Coordinates: 40.61505°N 75.36492°W
- Operator: Bethlehem Redevelopment Authority
- Website: Hoover-Mason Trestle

The Hoover-Mason Trestle is a 1650-foot elevated linear park in Bethlehem, Pennsylvania on the reclaimed industrial site of Bethlehem Steel. The trestle is 46 feet high and was originally an elevated narrow gauge rail line for raw materials, built around 1905.

== History ==
The trestle is located on 10 acres and features five furnaces with the oldest at the western end of the site dating from 1913. In the 1960s, two additional furnaces were razed after years of disuse. Railcars carried coke, limestone, and iron ore along the trestle from the Lehigh River to the blast furnaces where their contents were then dropped. In its heyday, each furnace could produce roughly 3,000 tons of iron each day and employed 31,000 people. Metal forged at the location helped construct the Golden Gate Bridge, George Washington Bridge, and built more than 1,000 naval and merchant ships during World War II.

The plant closed in 1995 after much of the steel industry went to foreign mills and mini-mills. Formally the number 2 steelmaker in the country, Bethlehem Steel was dissolved and acquired by the International Steel Group in 2003.

=== Redevelopment ===
The site began redevelopment in 2011 that cost $15 million and opened in 2015. The adaptive reuse of the site was designed by Wallace Roberts & Todd (WRT). WRT's design consisted of a cantilevered steel canopy over the Levitt Pavilion. The pitched lawn around the outdoor stage seats 2,500 where the observer can view the illuminated furnaces designed by Hervé Descottes as a backdrop to the stage.

Becoming SteelStacks, an arts and entertainment district, the site includes multiple performance venues, plazas and parks with the plant's rusted five blast furnaces were left standing and serve as a backdrop for the new campus. The 1,650 foot trestle turned walkway connects Levitt Pavilion to Sands Casino Resort Bethlehem. The walkway is intended to give people the feeling of moving through history with use of the trestle and a new structure. Inspired by the High Line in New York City and designed by Patrick Cullina, plantings were chosen to highlight the lighting and take cues from the existing structure.

SteelStacks currently features the ArtsQuest Center, a contemporary performing arts center, the Wind Creek Bethlehem casino resort (formerly Sands Casino Resort Bethlehem), and new studios for WLVT-TV, the Lehigh Valley's PBS affiliate. The area includes three outdoor music venues: Levitt Pavilion is a free music venue featuring lawn seating for up to 2,500 people; Air Products Town Square at Steelstacks; and PNC Plaza, which hosts concerts.

== Gallery ==
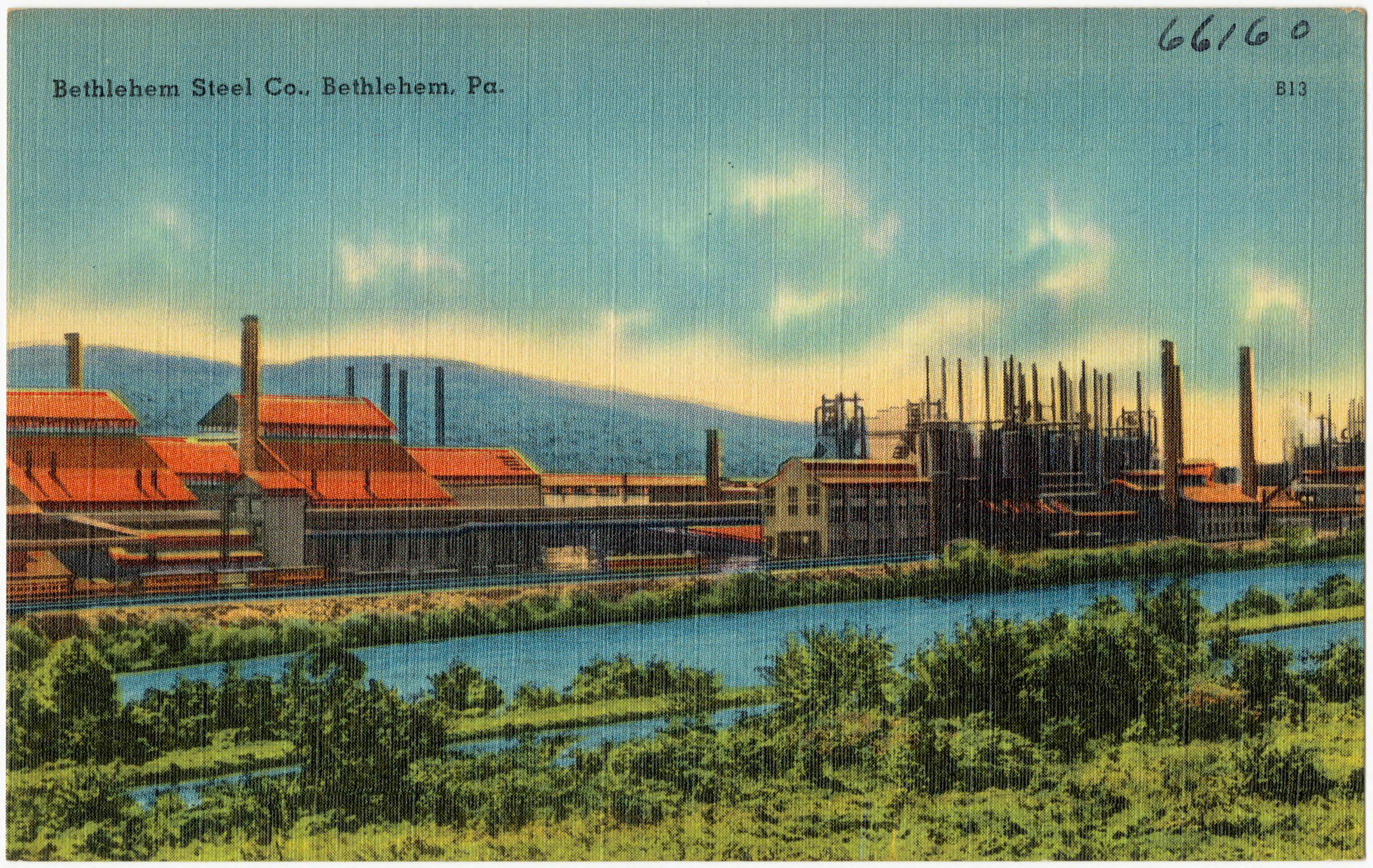
Bethlehem Steel Co, between circa 1930 and 1945

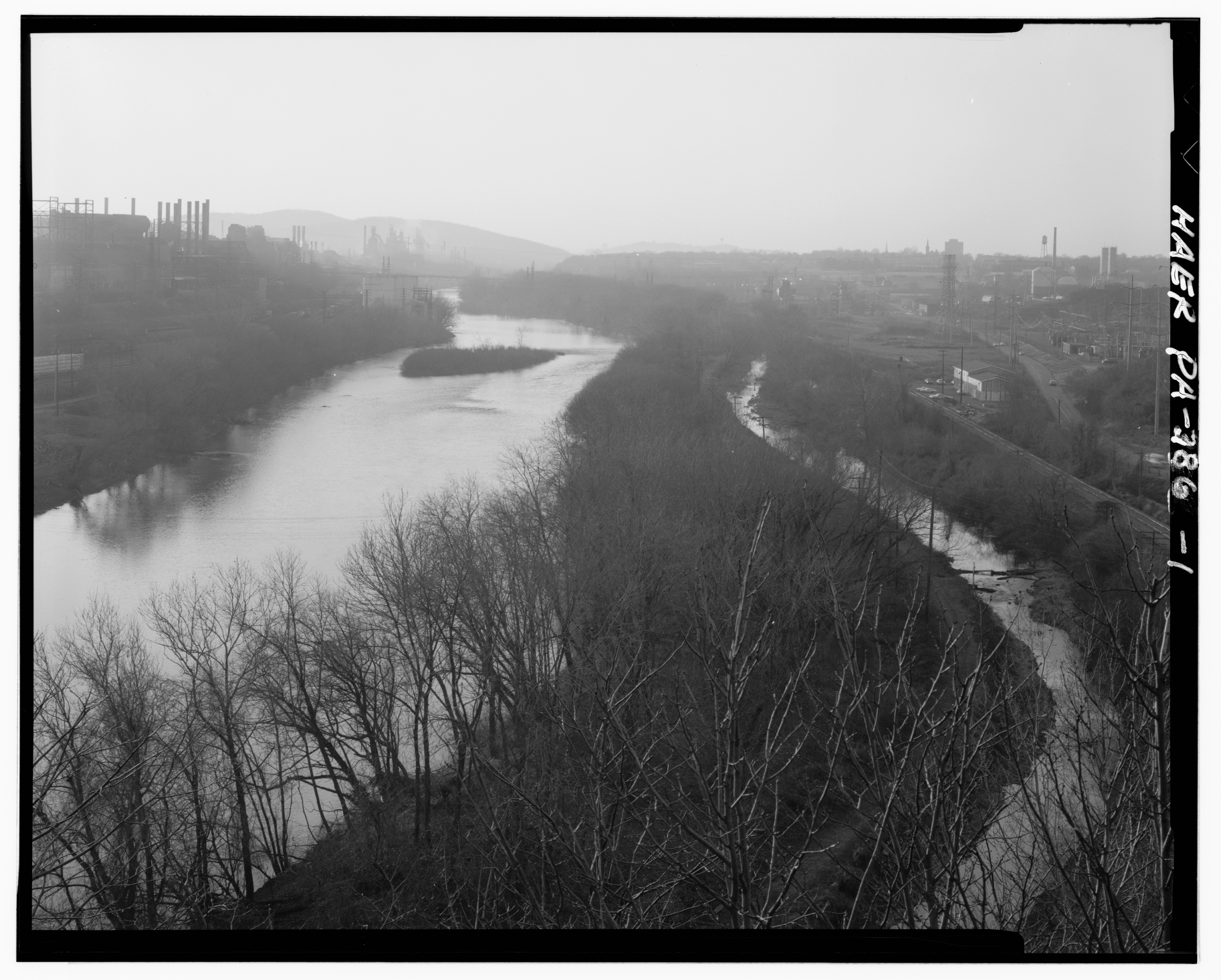
Overview of the south Bethlehem works as seen from Pop's Rock; The works is on the left side of the river and the Lehigh Canal parallels the river to the right; looking west, 1979

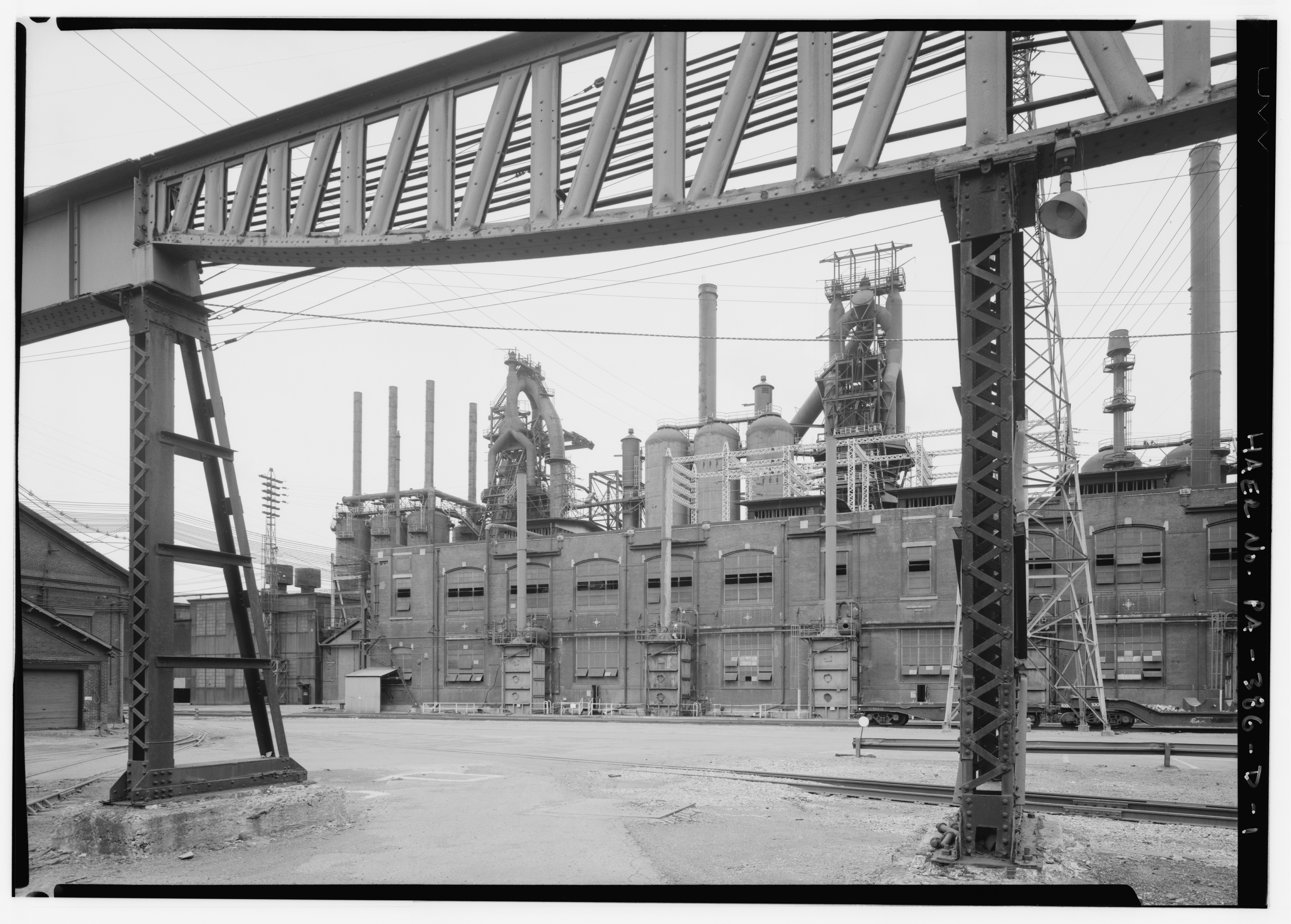
Blast furnace "A" (built in 1907) to the left; in the foreground is the turbo-blower and blast furnace gas-powered electric generating, 1988

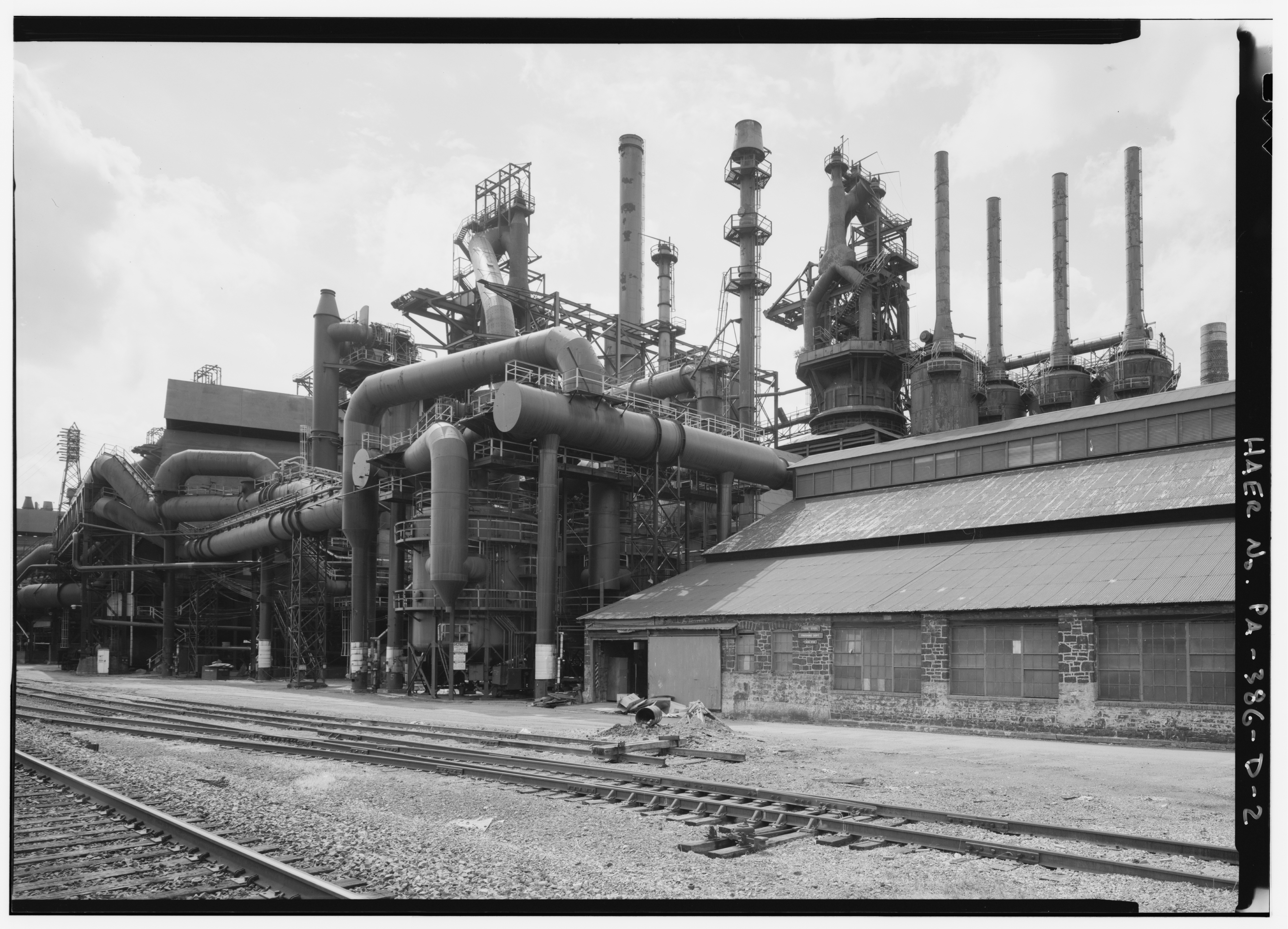
Blast furnace "A"; looking southeast; The building to the right is the crucible steel building, 1988

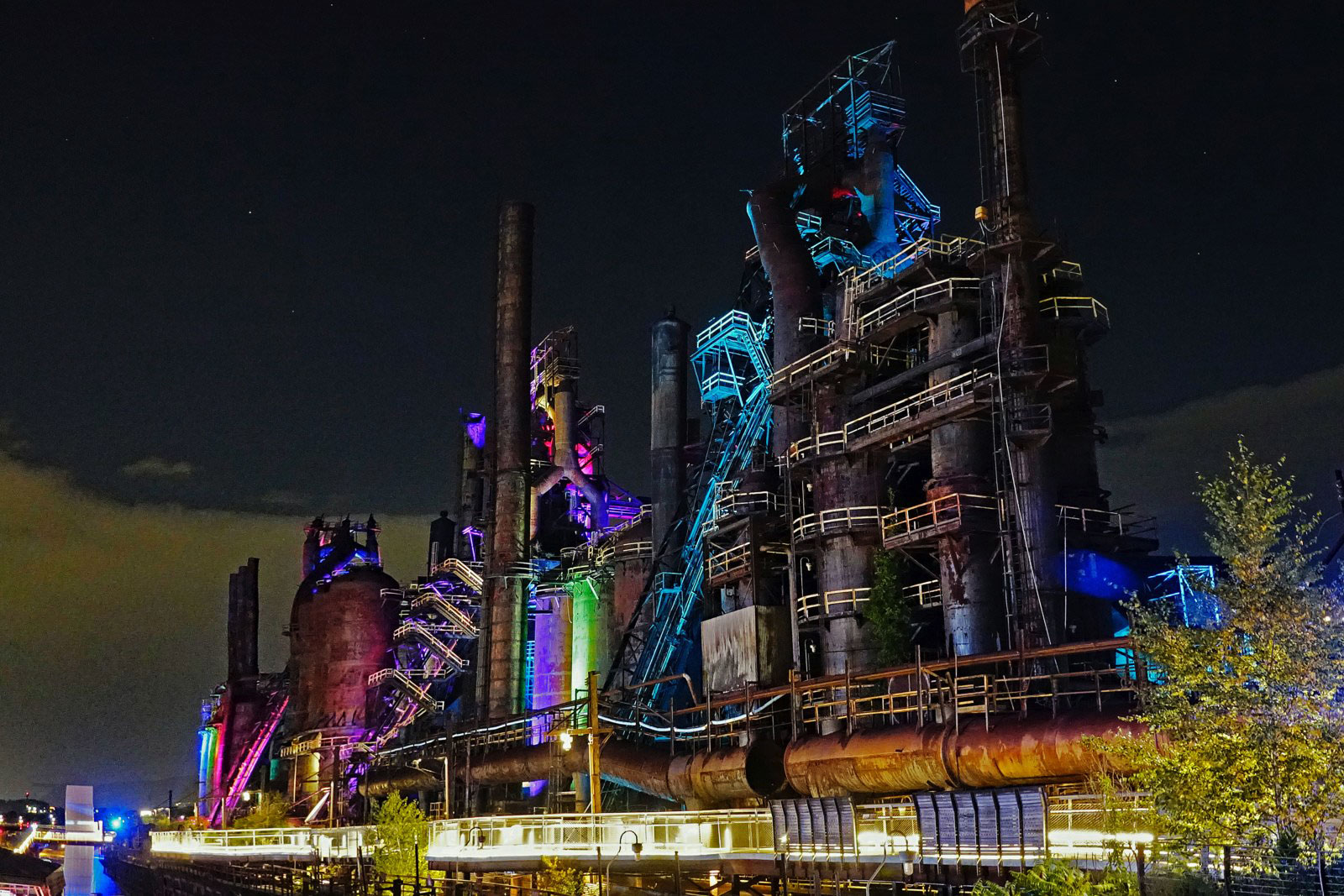
SteelStacks, 2017

== See also ==
- List of rail trails in the United States
- List of rail trails in Pennsylvania
