= Montour Railroad =

Defunct railroad in Pennsylvania

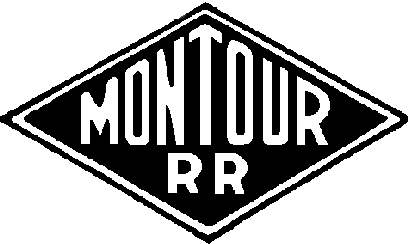

Overview
- Headquarters: Coraopolis, Pennsylvania
- Reporting mark: MTR
- Locale: Coraopolis, Pennsylvania to Imperial, Pennsylvania and West Mifflin, Pennsylvania
- Dates of operation: 1877–1984

Technical
- Track gauge: 4 ft 8 1/2 in (1,435 mm) standard gauge

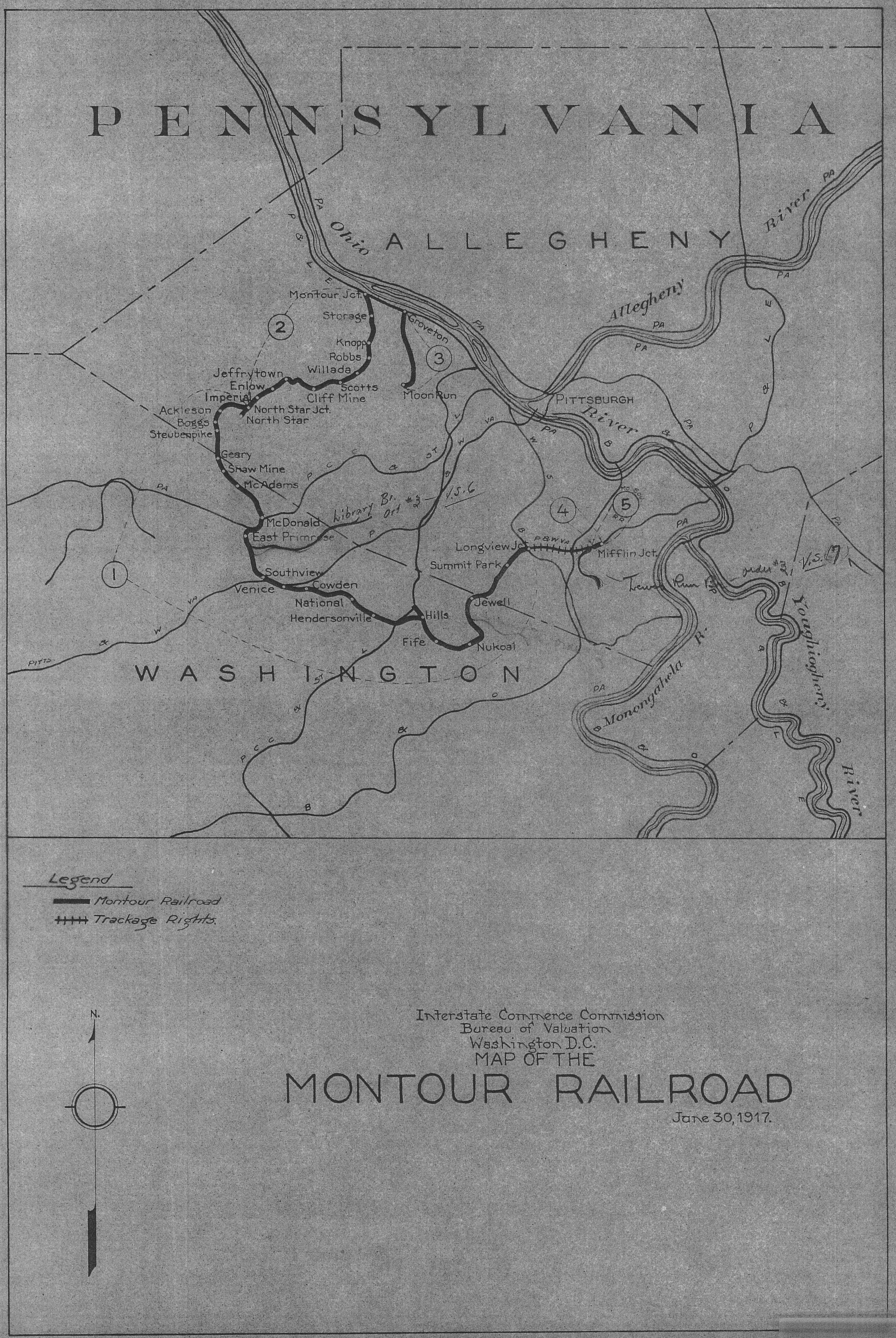
1917 map of the railroad

The Montour Railroad (reporting mark MTR) was a short line railroad company operating passenger and freight service in southwestern Pennsylvania. At its height in the 1930s, the railroad served 27 mines transporting nearly seven million tons of coal annually in Allegheny and Washington Counties.

== History ==
The Montour Railroad Company was chartered in 1877 as a wholly owed subsidiary of the Imperial Coal Company. The first segment constructed extended from the Pittsburgh and Lake Erie Railroad line at Montour Junction, near Coraopolis, Pennsylvania to the Imperial Coal Company mines at Imperial, Pennsylvania. In 1901 the Pittsburgh Coal Company assumed control of the railroad. A major expansion was undertaken in 1912 to reach new coal mines and factories. By 1914 the railroad reached the town of West Mifflin, Pennsylvania on the Monongahela River. The Montour Railroad became an important feeder line and eventually all five major railroads in the southwestern Pennsylvania market were linked to the Montour Railroad. In 1946 the Pittsburgh Coal Company sold the Montour Railroad to the Pennsylvania Railroad and the Pittsburgh and Lake Erie Railroad (a subsidiary of the New York Central Railroad), who operated it jointly. A five-mile (8.0 km) branch served Moon Run, this segment being operated until 1936. The P&LE acquired sole control of the Montour Railroad in 1975.

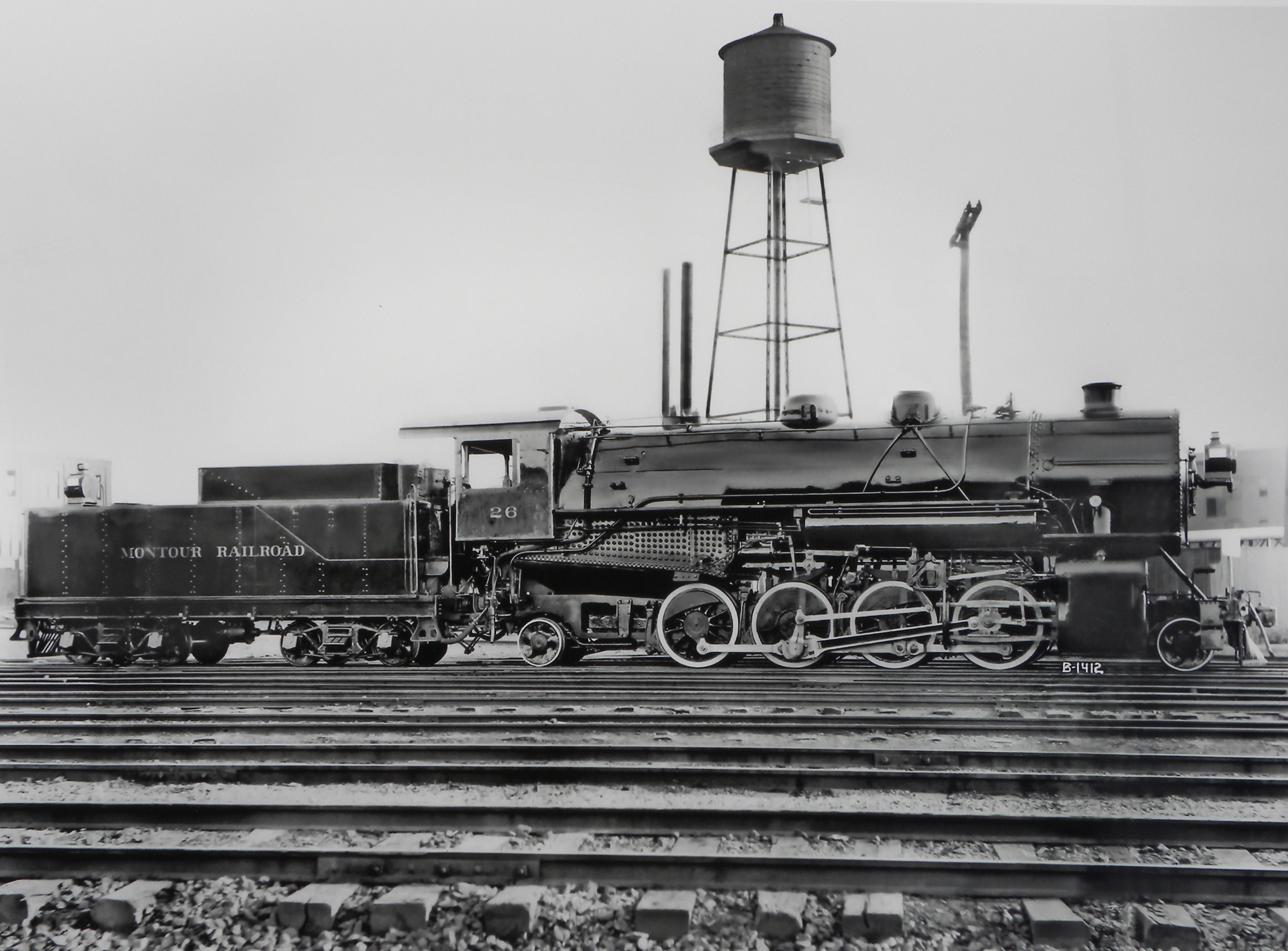
A Mikado-type steam locomotive operated by the Montour

The railroad's engine houses and shops were at Montour Junction, near the Ohio River at Coraopolis, Pennsylvania. The Montour Railroad had passenger service in its early years from 15 stations along its route, but passenger service was discontinued in 1927. By the 1950s most of the coal mines the Montour serviced had been worked out and the Montour began a slow decline. The Montour Railroad was down to just 23 miles (37 km) of track between Montour Junction and Gilmore Junction when operations ceased in 1984 with the closing of the Westland Coal mine, the Montour’s last remaining major customer. In the 1990s large portions of the right of way were acquired by the Montour Trail Council in a rails-to-trails program.

In 1944 Montour reported 159 million ton-miles of revenue freight; at the end of that year it operated 50 miles (80 km) of road and 84 miles (135 km) of track.

=== Westland Branch ===
The Westland Branch was opened in 1928 to serve Westland Mine #1. Later, Westland Mine #2 was opened, and the Montour was extended to serve it. Westland #1 closed in 1981. The #2 mine was the last operating mine served by the Montour, finally closing in 1983, and demolished in 1985. In December 2010 MarkWest Energy announced plans to lease the Westland Branch right of way from the Montour Trail Council for 30 years. The branch was redeveloped as a combination trail and railroad operated by the Wheeling and Lake Erie Railway to serve MarkWest's Westland natural gas processing plant. Construction was completed and the branch began operation in August 2012.

=== Preservation ===
In 2019, the Montour Railroad's SW9 locomotive #82 was acquired by the Age of Steam Roundhouse from the Flats Industrial Railroad, restored to its original condition, and painted into Montour colors. Later, Montour 84, another SW9, received the same treatment.

== See also ==
- Montour Trail
