= Greene River Trail =

Rail trail in Pennsylvania, United States

Coordinates: 39.950558°N 79.981319°W

- Length: 5.2 mi (8.4 km)
- Location: Greene County, Pennsylvania
- Designation: Rail Trail
- Trailheads: Millsboro, Pennsylvania; Crucible, Pennsylvania
- Use: Hiking, Biking, Cross-country skiing
- Difficulty: Easy
- Season: Year-Round
- Sights: Monongahela River
- Hazards: Severe Weather

The Greene River Trail is a non-motorized rail trail 60 miles south of Pittsburgh in Greene County, Pennsylvania. Greene River Trail runs along the banks of the Monongahela River as it winds through the former coal mining region of Greene County. The 5.2-mile trail begins in Millsboro at the Greene Cove Yacht Club, where the trail follows Ten Mile Creek for a quarter mile before turning upstream along the left (west) bank of the Monongahela River. The trail passes through Rices Landing and ends in Crucible. Plans call for the trail to be extended for 9 more miles to Nemacolin in the future.

Parking: Greene Cove Marina, Millsboro; Pumpkin Run Park, Rices Landing.
