= Indian Creek Valley Trail =

Rail trail in Pennsylvania, United States

Coordinates: 40.05025°N 79.38610°W

- Length: 7.5 mi (12.1 km)
- Location: Fayette and Westmoreland Counties, Pennsylvania, United States
- Trailheads: Indian Head, Pennsylvania; Jones Mills, Pennsylvania
- Use: Hiking, Biking
- Hazards: Severe weather

Indian Creek Valley Trail is a Pennsylvania rail-trail in northeast Fayette and southeast Westmoreland Counties about 50 miles southeast of Pittsburgh. The Saltlick Township-owned Section (6 miles) opened in 1989, where the trail traverses Indian Creek along the former Indian Creek Valley Railroad (ICVRR). The second phase (1.5 miles) opened in 2009, and is in Donegal Township; however, it is owned by the Mountain Watershed Association. Plans call to extend the trail further in the future.

== Trailheads and facilities ==
Listed below are facilities north to south.

Trailhead/Area Name	Intersecting Road	Features/Facilities
Jones Mills	State Route 31	Parking
Champion	County Line Road	Parking
Melcroft	State Route 711 and State Route 381	Spur to Trail; Picnic Area, Chemical Toilet and Parking Lot.
Indian Head	Indian Head Road	Parking, picnic area, playground, sanitary toilets.
