= Walker-Ewing-Glass Log House =

Historic log house in Pennsylvania, United States

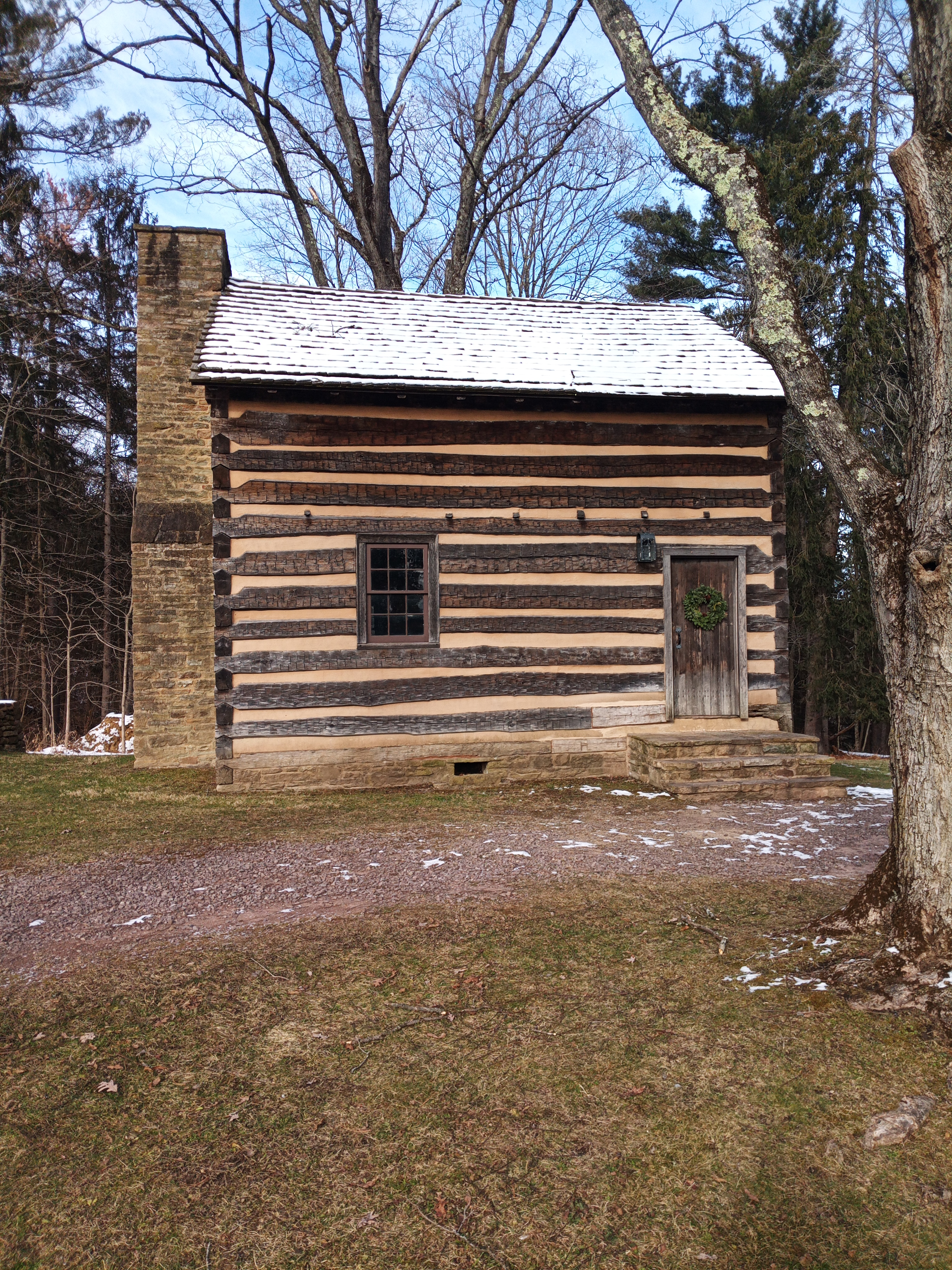

- Location of the Walker-Ewing-Glass Log House in Allegheny County, Pennsylvania Walker-Ewing-Glass Log House (the United States)
- 40°25′4.85″N 80°10′9.41″W
- Location: Pinkerton Run Road in Settlers Cabin Park, North Fayette Township, Pennsylvania, USA

History
- Built: circa 1780s

Site notes
- Architect: John Henry
- Architectural style: Vernacular

Pittsburgh Landmark – PHLF
- Designated: 1970

The Walker–Ewing–Glass Log House is a historic log dwelling located on Pinkerton Run Road in Settlers Cabin Park, North Fayette Township, Pennsylvania, United States. The house is believed to date from the late 18th century, possibly the 1780s, on land acquired in 1785 by brothers Isaac and Gabriel Walker, early Euro-American settlers in the area. It is traditionally associated with an earlier settler, John Henry, who is sometimes credited as the original builder. The structure is named for the Walker, Ewing, and Glass families, who owned and occupied the property over several generations. It is regarded as an example of 18th-century frontier housing in western Pennsylvania and is the structure that gives Settlers Cabin Park its name. In 1970 it was listed as a Historic Landmark by the Pittsburgh History & Landmarks Foundation under the name "Settler's Cabin (Walker–Ewing–Glass house)". It was restored in 1971 with the consultation of architect and preservationist Charles Morse Stotz.

The log house stands on land owned by Allegheny County within Settlers Cabin Park and is managed by Pittsburgh Botanic Garden. A long-term lease granted in the late 1990s brought the southwestern portion of the park into the Garden's grounds. A 2013 amendment to the lease expanded the lease area to include the log house and its immediate setting. Today, the interior is fitted out as an interpretive space illustrating 18th- and early-19th-century domestic life, and it is periodically opened for guided tours and programs by Pittsburgh Botanic Garden.

== Architecture ==
The Walker–Ewing–Glass Log House is a modest, rectangular, single-pen log dwelling of one-and-a-half stories set on a rubble-stone foundation. It is built of hewn logs joined with notched corners, with clapboard-covered gable ends and a moderately pitched roof. A large stone chimney projects from one gable end, reflecting the 20th-century reconstruction of the fireplace mass as part of the restoration, and exposed joist ends indicate loft or second-floor sleeping space above the main room. The house is often described in local histories as representative of late-18th-century frontier housing in western Pennsylvania, with later improvements such as glazed sash, plank flooring, and iron hardware distinguishing it from earlier, more rudimentary log cabins. According to the 1973 National Register inventory form, the building was at one time converted to barn use, with a large opening cut into one wall; later restoration work removed these alterations and returned the exterior to domestic-scale door and window openings. It is frequently discussed alongside the nearby Walker-Ewing Log House, a somewhat later (c. 1790) log dwelling located downhill near the intersection of Noblestown Road and Pinkerton Run Road that is separately listed on the National Register of Historic Places.

== See also ==
- Walker-Ewing Log House
- Neill Log House
- Log house
