= Settlers Cabin Park =

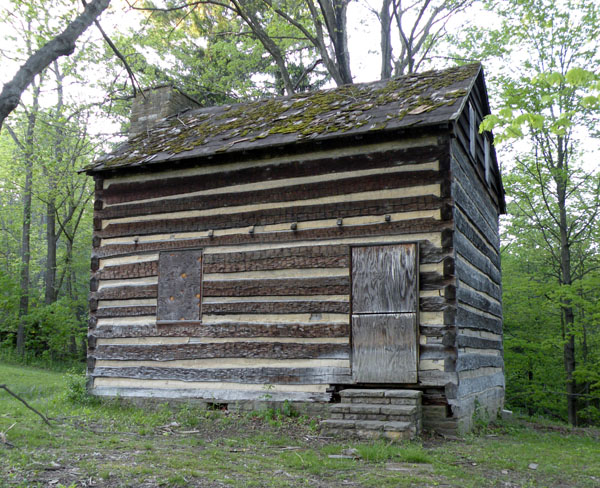
- The Walker-Ewing-Glass Log House, located on Pinkerton Run Road, is the 1780s log house that gives Settlers Cabin Park its name.

- Location within Pennsylvania Location within the United States
- Type: Municipal
- Location: Allegheny County, Pennsylvania
- Coordinates: 40°26′3.17″N 80°9′35.02″W
- Area: 1,610-acre (7 km^{2})

Settlers Cabin Park is a 1,610-acre (7 km^{2}) county park in Allegheny County, Pennsylvania, United States. The park spans Collier, North Fayette, and Robinson townships and is part of the Allegheny County park system.

== History ==
The park is named for the Walker-Ewing-Glass Log House, a log house dating to the late 18th century located within the park. Archaeological work at the log house site was carried out by Jacob Grimm, an avocational archaeologist and research associate affiliated with the Carnegie Museum of Natural History.

The themes of the eleven picnic groves in this park are derived from the names of Indigenous peoples of the Americas: Algonquin, Seneca, Apache, Tomahawk, etc.

== Geography and features ==
Settlers Cabin Park is located west of Pittsburgh. The park includes a wave pool and a diving platform, along with other recreational facilities such as trails, playgrounds, tennis courts, basketball courts, and an off-leash dog park.

The park has multiple reservable picnic shelters, including shelters named Algonquin, Apache, Cayuga, Chippewa, Iroquois, Mingo, and Seneca.

Allegheny County leases a portion of land associated with the park to Pittsburgh Botanic Garden, a nonprofit botanical garden open to visitors by paid admission.

== Gallery ==
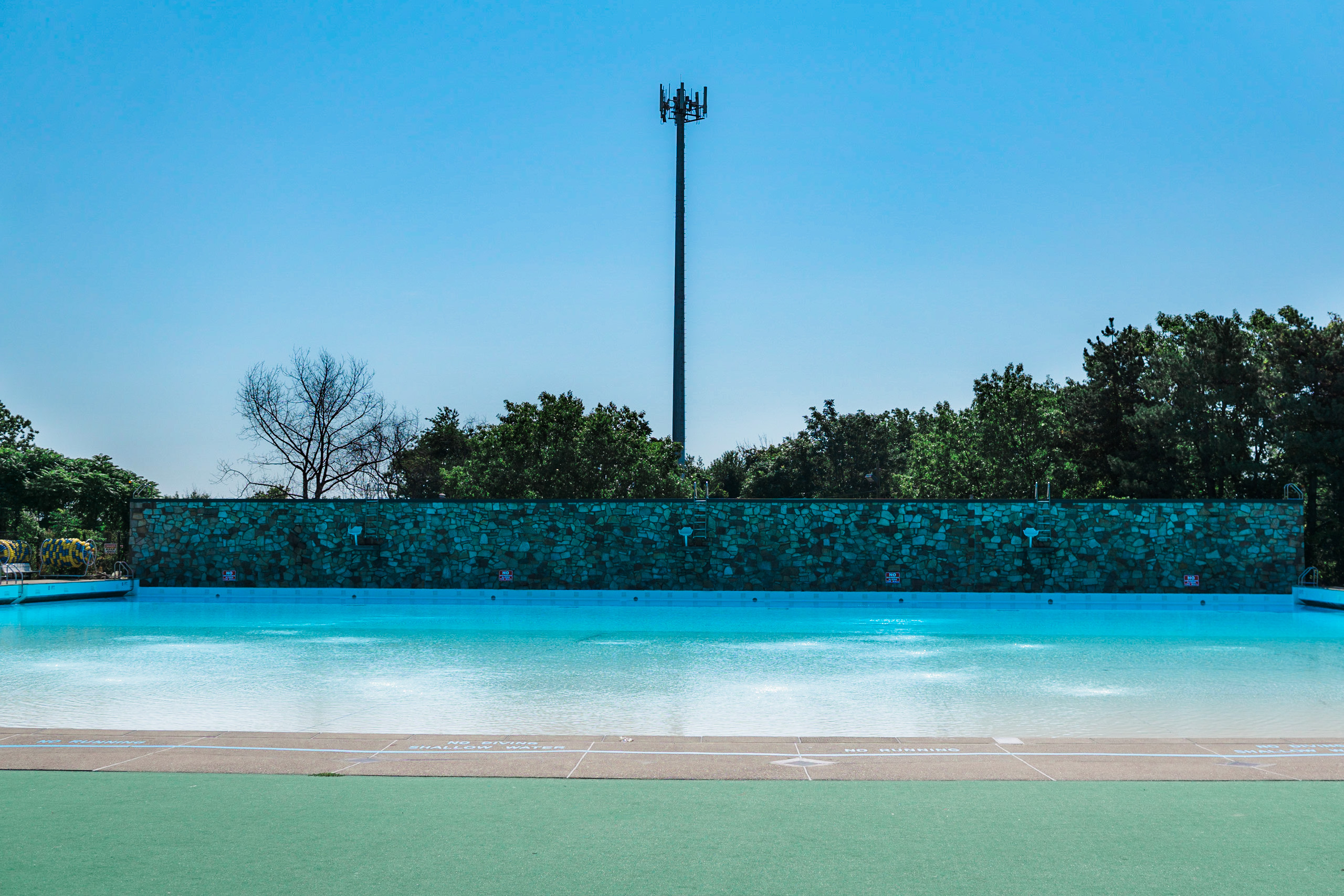
Wave Pool at Settlers Cabin Park
