= Plainfield Township Trail =

Rail trail in Pennsylvania, United States

- Location: Plainfield Township, Pennsylvania, U.S.
- Use: Multi-use rail trail

Plainfield Township Trail is a 6.9-mile (11.1 km) rail trail in Plainfield Township, Pennsylvania. The trail extends from Stockertown (Belfast Junction) to Pen Argyl at Pen Argyl Junction. The trail follows the former Conrail rail line, which was abandoned in 1981.
