= Montour Trail =

Rail trail in Pennsylvania, United States

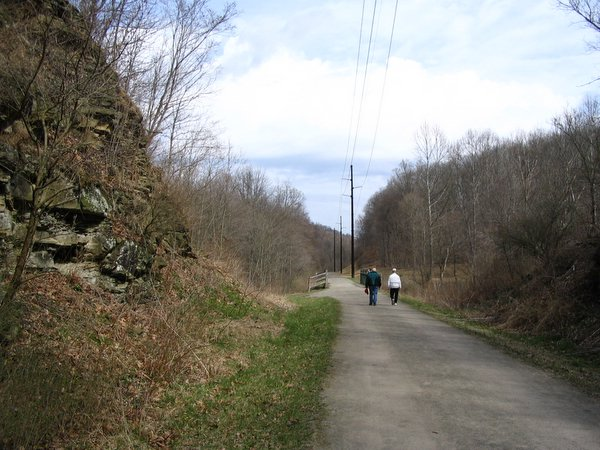
- The Montour Trail between miles 3 and 4, photo taken March 2006
- Length: 59.3 mi (95.4 km)
- Location: Allegheny County, Pennsylvania, USA
- Designation: National Recreation Trail (2017)
- Trailheads: Coraopolis, Pennsylvania; 40.5048°N 80.1450°W; Clairton, Pennsylvania; 40.3051°N 79.8838°W
- Use: Multi-use
- Difficulty: Easy
- Season: Year-round
- Sights: see Points of Interest below
Trail map

The Montour Trail is a multi-use recreational rail trail near Pittsburgh, Pennsylvania. It was formerly the Montour Railroad. It was named a national recreation trail in 2017.

It has a mostly crushed limestone with partially asphalt surface, appropriate for bicycling, walking, running, and cross-country skiing. Eventually, this trail segment will extend 47 miles (76 km) from Coraopolis, Pennsylvania to Clairton, Pennsylvania.

The trail is part of a 204-mile (328 km) rails to trails project between Pittsburgh and Cumberland, Maryland that makes up part of a 400-mile (640 km) trail system between Pittsburgh and Washington, D.C., known as the Great Allegheny Passage.

== Connecting trails ==
- Panhandle Trail: The Montour Trail crosses over the Panhandle Trail on the McDonald Trestle. The Montour-Panhandle connector trail is approximately 1.1 miles (1.8 km) long and connects the two trails. The Panhandle stretches 29 miles (47 km) between Carnegie, Pennsylvania, and Weirton, West Virginia. The last unfinished section between Joffre and Burgettstown was finished in August 2008, and the trail is now complete.
- Steel Valley Trail runs 14 miles (23 km) from Clairton through McKeesport to West Homestead. The McKeesport-West Homestead section is part of the GAP trail which connects Washington, D.C. to Pittsburgh solely on bike trails. At the Clairton Trailhead 40°18′19.44″N 79°52′59.14″W it connects to the Montour Trail.
- Great Allegheny Passage: This ambitious project links Cumberland, Maryland, and Point State Park in Pittsburgh. Another branch extends to the Pittsburgh International Airport. The Great Allegheny Passage links to the historic Chesapeake and Ohio Canal, which runs from Cumberland to Washington, D.C.
- Ohio River Trail: This proposed trail will connect the Montour Trail to the Great Ohio Lake-to-River Greenway in Ohio. When completed the trail will be an important link in a mega-trail system from the Great Lakes Region to Washington, D.C.

== Points of interest ==
- McDonald Viaduct (Trestle): Formerly used by the Montour Railroad, the 960-foot (290 m) long trestle reopened in 2003. It spans over Noblestown Road, Robinson Run, the Panhandle Trail and John's Avenue in Washington County, PA.
- Enlow Tunnel: At trail mile 7.2–7.3 (40.4582°N 80.2228°W), this Findlay Township tunnel was also formerly used by the Montour Railroad, until its incorporation into the trail. In 2000, Duquesne Light and Findlay Township installed lights inside the tunnel.
- National Tunnel: At 40.3170°N 80.1818°W, this Cecil Township tunnel was formerly used by the Montour Railroad and was abandoned with the railroad until it was acquired with the rail right-of-way in the 1980s by the Montour Trail Council (MTC). The tunnel is 623-foot (190 m) and is paved with asphalt pavement with reflectors for safe navigation. In 2012, electrical lighting and signs warning of accumulations of ice were added to the tunnel to increase safety. In the fall of 2025, a routine inspection revealed dangerous leaks and the tunnel was closed until repairs could be made. As of October 2026, the tunnel remains closed.
- Library Trestle: This 506-foot (154 m) railroad trestle over Library Rd. (PA 88) in South Park was also formerly used by the Montour Railroad, until its incorporation into the trail. Renovation was completed in the spring of 2015.
- West Peters Trail Area: This approximately two-mile section in Peters Township, PA of trail holds four amazing sites: the Greer Tunnel, two bridges directly adjacent to the tunnel, and the X-1 railroad service crane, a former working crane for the Montour Railroad. One of the bridges adjacent to the Greer Tunnel is the Chartiers Creek High Bridge, the highest bridge on the trail. A working railroad line also crosses directly under the trail in this area.

== Organization ==
The Montour Trail is managed and maintained by The Montour Trail Council (MTC). The MTC is a non-profit all-volunteer group which builds, operates, and maintains the trail. It is a registered 501(c)3 not-for-profit corporation, relying on corporate, foundation and government grants and private donations for funding. As of 2012, MTC maintained net assets in excess of $9,300,000.00.

== Branches ==
The Montour Trail has four branches: Bethel, Muse, Westland, and the Airport Connector. The Bethel Branch extends from the trail in Peters Township into Bethel Park. There are plans to extend the existing Bethel Branch to nearby Millennium Park by following the remaining section of the former railway. The Muse Branch is a planned, undeveloped branch in Cecil Township that goes to the town of Muse. The Westland Branch is a branch that extends from the trail in Venice to the town of Westland. The Airport Connector is a branch of the trail that goes from the mainline trail in Imperial to Pittsburgh International Airport. The Connector does not follow any of the Montour Railroad grade, rather it follows roads to the airport.

In December 2010 MarkWest Energy announced plans to lease the Westland Branch right-of-way from the Montour Trail Council for 30 years. The branch was redeveloped as a combination trail and railroad operated by the Wheeling and Lake Erie Railway to serve MarkWest's Westland natural gas processing plant. Construction was completed and the branch began operation in August 2012.
