= Collier Township, Pennsylvania =

Township in Pennsylvania, US

Collier Township
- Township
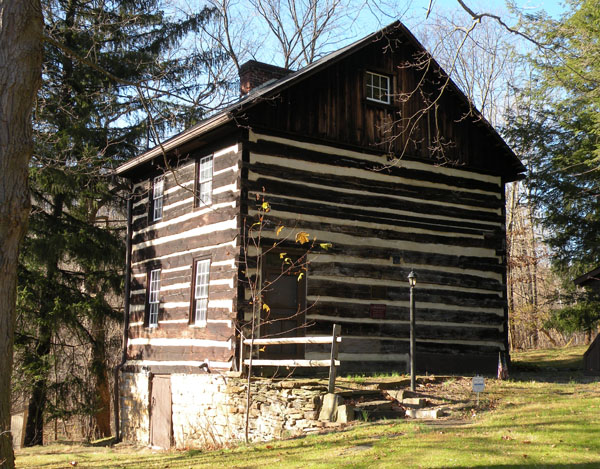
- Walker-Ewing Log House, built around 1790.

- Flag Logo

- Location in Allegheny County and state of Pennsylvania
- Coordinates: 40°23′0″N 80°6′59″W
- Country: United States
- State: Pennsylvania
- County: Allegheny

Government
  - President, Board of Commissioners: George Macino (R)

Area
  - Total: 13.62 sq mi (35.28 km^{2})
  - Land: 13.58 sq mi (35.16 km^{2})
  - Water: 0.046 sq mi (0.12 km^{2})

Population (2020)
  - Total: 8,931
  - Estimate (2022): 8,936
  - Density: 589.7/sq mi (227.67/km^{2})
- Time zone: UTC-5 (Eastern (EST))
  - Summer (DST): UTC-4 (EDT)
- FIPS code: 42-003-15216
- Website: colliertownship.net

Collier Township is a township in Allegheny County, Pennsylvania, United States. The population was 8,931 at the 2020 census, an increase over the figure of 7,080 tabulated in 2010.

== Geography ==
According to the United States Census Bureau, the township has a total area of 14.2 square miles (37 km^{2}), of which 14.2 square miles (37 km^{2}) is land and 0.04 square miles (0.10 km^{2}) is water. The total area comprising water is thus 0.21%.

== Inner communities ==
Kirwan Heights, Rennerdale, Cubbage Hill, Ewingsville, Fort Pitt, Nevillewood, Presto, Walker's Mill.

Since 1968, Kirwan Heights was designated, along with neighboring borough Heidelberg, as Exit 55 on Interstate 79. In July 2012, PennDOT changed the signs to "Heidelberg/Collier". However, the sign at the PA 50 junction off this exit still indicates "PA 50 West/Kirwan Heights".

Collier is served by five ZIP codes: 15106 (Carnegie), 15071 (Oakdale), 15142 (Presto), 15017 (Bridgeville), and 15205 (Pittsburgh).

== Surrounding neighborhoods ==
Collier Township has seven borders, including Robinson Township to the north and northeast, Carnegie and Heidelberg to the east, Scott Township to the east and southeast, Bridgeville to the south-southeast, South Fayette Township to the south and southwest, and North Fayette Township to the west.

== History ==
One of the earliest settlers of the township was James Ewing. James Ewing was born in Cecil County, Maryland, about 1730, emigrated to the west in 1770, and built a gristmill on Robinson's run. His claim comprised a thousand acres (4 km^{2}). Gabriel and Isaac Walker were born in Lancaster County, Pa., the former in 1744, the latter in 1746. The Scotch-Irish brothers emigrated to the west in 1772, and purchased two thousand acres (8 km^{2}) from John Henry. Gabriel located near Hays crossing, on the Pan Handle railroad, and Isaac at Walker's Mills.

Collier Township was erected on June 7, 1875, comprising portions of Robinson and South Fayette townships, and a half-square mile of North Fayette. The township is named for Hon. Frederick H. Collier, a county court judge.

== Demographics ==
Historical population
Census	Pop.	Note	%±
1880	1,697		—
1890	2,961		74.5%
1900	3,728		25.9%
1910	4,211		13.0%
1920	4,651		10.4%
1930	6,091		31.0%
1940	7,685		26.2%
1950	8,039		4.6%
1960	8,021		−0.2%
1970	6,874		−14.3%
1980	5,063		−26.3%
1990	4,841		−4.4%
2000	5,265		8.8%
2010	7,080		34.5%
2020	8,931		26.1%
2024 (est.)	9,014		0.9%

As of the 2000 census, there were 5,265 people, 2,224 households, and 1,547 families residing in the township. The population density was 371.0 inhabitants per square mile (143.2/km^{2}). There were 2,358 housing units at an average density of 166.2 per square mile (64.2/km^{2}). The racial makeup of the township was 98.06% White, 0.74% African American, 0.49% Asian, 0.21% from other races, and 0.49% from two or more races. Hispanic or Latino of any race were 0.36% of the population.

There were 2,224 households, out of which 23.6% had children under the age of 18 living with them, 58.0% were married couples living together, 8.5% had a female householder with no husband present, and 30.4% were non-families. 27.4% of all households were made up of individuals, and 16.1% had someone living alone who was 65 years of age or older. The average household size was 2.36 and the average family size was 2.87.

In the township the population was spread out, with 19.4% under the age of 18, 4.7% from 18 to 24, 24.3% from 25 to 44, 26.3% from 45 to 64, and 25.3% who were 65 years of age or older. The median age was 46 years. For every 100 females, there were 91.8 males. For every 100 females age 18 and over, there were 86.6 males.

The median income for a household in the township was $41,989, and the median income for a family was $50,469. Males had a median income of $41,667 versus $31,837 for females. The per capita income for the township was $24,841. About 3.7% of families and 6.4% of the population were below the poverty line, including 9.0% of those under age 18 and 3.2% of those age 65 or over.

== Government ==
Presidential elections results
Year	Republican	Democratic	Third parties
2024	Lost	WON	Lost
2020	52% 3,058	46% 2,699	1% 68
2016	53% 2,578	41% 1,996	6% 257
2012	58% 2,137	42% 1,541	0% 35

== Education ==
Collier Township's public education is provided by the Chartiers Valley School District. In 2012, the Pennsylvania System of School Assessment (PSSA) ranked Chartiers Valley High School in the upper two-fifths of all Pennsylvania high schools (263rd out of 676 high schools). The school's mascot is the Colts. The Chartiers Valley School District also serves the municipalities of Bridgeville, Scott and Heidelberg. Chartiers Valley High School is physically located in Collier Township, although its address is Bridgeville.

== 2012 Little League World Series ==
In the summer of 2012, Collier Township's 12-year-old little league team represented the State of Pennsylvania in the Little League World Series. On its way to representing the state, Collier Township did not lose a game while defeating McKeesport, Moon, North Allegheny, Bullskin, Sharon, Latrobe, Southern Columbia, Hershey and Morrisville (twice). Collier Township then advanced to the Mid-Atlantic Regional Tournament at Bristol, Connecticut. They played New Jersey (LOSS), Maryland (WIN), Delaware (LOSS) and New York (WIN). Collier Township advanced to the Mid-Atlantic Regional Semi-Finals, where they again lost to New Jersey. The game was shown live on ESPN2.

== 2013 Intermediate (50/70) World Series National Champions ==
In the summer of 2013, Collier Township's 11 to 13-year-old Intermediate League team (largely represented by the same players from the 2012 LLWS team) were the United States champions in the Intermediate (50/70) World Series. On their way to representing the United States, Collier Township did not lose a game in the East Regionals in Commack, New York, defeating Massachusetts (41–0), Rhode Island (23–2), Maryland (16–0), New Jersey (15–0), and in the Regional Championship game New York (12–2). In the United States bracket held at Livermore, California, Collier Township lost to Houston, Texas (4–6), beat Nogales, Arizona (7–3), beat Jenison, Michigan (4–3), beat Pleasanton, California (3–1), and in the National Championship game, beat Houston, Texas (5–4). In the World Series game, also held at Livermore, California, Collier Township lost to Osaka, Japan (1–10). The (50/70) designation represents the distance from the pitchers rubber to home plate (50 feet), and the distance between the bases (70 feet). These distances are larger than the standard little league field (46/60).
