= West Hills (Pennsylvania) =

Coordinates: 40.43°N 80.17°W

The West Hills is a term generally used to collectively describe the western suburbs of Pittsburgh, Pennsylvania. A smaller portion of the area is known as the Airport Area.

Though most communities are located southwest and west of the Ohio River, some of the West Hills area is located on the northern side of the river. I-79 and state routes 60 and 65 serve the West Hills, with I-376 (known locally as the Parkway West), connecting the region to the Pittsburgh International Airport.

== Communities ==
While there are no official boundaries of what communities are part of this Pittsburgh region, the following list of communities are considered to be part of the western hills area of Pittsburgh.

- Carnegie
- Coraopolis
- Crafton
- Crescent Township
- Edgeworth
- Findlay Township
- Ingram
- Kennedy Township
- Leetsdale
- McKees Rocks
- Moon Township
- Neville Island
- North Fayette Township
- Oakdale Borough
- Robinson Township
- Rosslyn Farms
- Sewickley
- Stowe Township
- Thornburg

== History ==
Once largely rural, the West Hills area has grown considerably since the addition of the Pittsburgh airport in 1951.

The airport's main terminal moved to Findlay Township in 1991 on land that once was a farm. With an empty terminal area in Moon, development on expanding the area's corporate business parks continued.

== Major corporations ==
- Dick's Sporting Goods corporate headquarters, Findlay Township
- Nova Chemicals, Moon Township
- FedEx Ground, Moon Township
- GlaxoSmithKline consumer division, Moon Township

== School districts ==
- Carlynton School District
- Cornell School District
- Quaker Valley School District
- Montour School District
- Moon Area School District
- Sto-Rox School District
- West Allegheny School District
