= West Allegheny School District =

Public school district in Pennsylvania, US

Address
- 100 Bruno Lane Imperial, Pennsylvania, 15126; United States

District information
- Type: Public
- Established: 1949
- Schools: 5

Students and staff
- District mascot: Indian
- Colors: Scarlet and Grey

Other information
- Website: www.westasd.org

The West Allegheny School District is a midsized, suburban public school district which is located in the western corner of Allegheny County, approximately 16 miles (26 km) from downtown Pittsburgh. The district comprises Findlay Township, North Fayette Township, and the Oakdale Borough. The district encompasses approximately 59 square miles (150 km^{2}) and is the largest in Allegheny County in terms of geographical area. The West Allegheny School District is home of the Pittsburgh International Airport terminal. West Allegheny was formed in 1949.

== Facilities ==
- West Allegheny Senior High School (Grades 9–12) – Located in North Fayette Township on Main Campus, 205 West Allegheny Road, Imperial, PA, 15126
- West Allegheny Middle School (Grades 6–8) – Located in North Fayette Township on Main Campus, 207 West Allegheny Road, Imperial, PA, 15126
- Donaldson Elementary School (Grades K-5) – Located in North Fayette Township, 600 Donaldson Road, Oakdale, PA 15071
- McKee Elementary School (Grades K-5) – Located in North Fayette Township, 1501 Oakdale Road, Oakdale, PA 15071
- Wilson Elementary School (Grades K-5) – Located in Findlay Township, 110 Bruno Lane, Imperial, PA 15126
- West Allegheny District Offices – Located in Findlay Township, 110 Bruno Lane, Imperial, PA 15126

== Football: team history ==
The high school's football team was founded along with the school district in 1949. The team has become a powerhouse program in both the WPIAL and the PIAA over the past 20 years under head coach Bob Palko. Under Palko's leadership, the Indians have won 8 WPIAL championships, the most recent of which coming in 2016, have appeared in 3 PIAA championship games, and won the 2001 AAA state title.

Throughout this time span, the team has sent several players on to play at NCAA Division I schools and the National Football League. In 2001, the Associated Press named Tyler Palko, son of former head coach Bob Palko, the 2001 Pennsylvania Big School Player of the Year. He was also a member of the USA Today All-America Team (Second-team) and three-time Pittsburgh Post-Gazette WPIAL Class AAA Player of the Year. Palko led his West Allegheny Indians to a PIAA state title in 2001 for AAA in Pennsylvania and has since played for the University of Pittsburgh Panthers and numerous professional teams. Other notable football alums include Dorin Dickerson and C.J. Davis, who both went on to play for Pitt and in the NFL.

Through the 1960s and 1970s West Allegheny shared an intense rivalry with Fort Cherry School District, though this has faded due to an increase in enrollment at West Allegheny and a decrease in enrollment at Fort Cherry, which placed the two schools in different classifications based on school size. More recent and current rivals include Moon, Montour, South Fayette, and Chartiers Valley. Rivals in 5A are Woodland Hills, North Hills and McKeesport

Before the mid-1990s, the Indians competed in Class AA, the third-largest of the four classifications based on enrollment. As the school's enrollment increased, the team was then moved to the AAA level, where in remained through the 2015 season. When the WPIAL and PIAA switched to a six-classification system beginning with the 2016–17 academic year, the football team was placed in class 5A, the second-largest of the six new classifications.

History in the WPIAL and PIAA Playoffs since 1993

Year	Classification	Farthest Round	Final Score
1993	AA	WPIAL Semi-finals	Washington 17, West Allegheny 14 (OT)
1997	AAA	PIAA Semi-finals	Perry 29, West Allegheny 17
1998	AAA	WPIAL Quarterfinals	Highlands 21, West Allegheny 11
1999	AAA	PIAA Championship	Strath Haven 21, West Allegheny 7
2000	AAA	PIAA Championship	Strath Haven 31, West Allegheny 28
2001	AAA	PIAA Championship	West Allegheny 28, Strath Haven 13
2002	AAA	WPIAL Quarterfinals	Pine-Richland 28, West Allegheny 7
2003	AAA	WPIAL First Round	Highlands 7, West Allegheny 6
2004	AAA	WPIAL Semi-finals	West Mifflin 23, West Allegheny 22
2005	AAA	WPIAL Semi-finals	Thomas Jefferson 35, West Allegheny 0
2006	AAA	WPIAL First Round	Franklin Regional 30, West Allegheny 14
2007	AAA	WPIAL Quarterfinals	Thomas Jefferson 49, West Allegheny 21
2009	AAA	PIAA Semi-finals	Manheim Central 45, West Allegheny 27
2010	AAA	WPIAL Quarterfinals	Mars 29, West Allegheny 3
2011	AAA	WPIAL First Round	Knoch 28, West Allegheny 7
2012	AAA	PIAA Quarterfinals	Erie Cathedral Prep 27, West Allegheny 13
2013	AAA	PIAA Quarterfinals	Erie Cathedral Prep 28, West Allegheny 0
2014	AAA	WPIAL Championship	Central Valley 35, West Allegheny 28
2015	AAA	WPIAL Quarterfinals	Thomas Jefferson 14, West Allegheny 0
2016	AAAAA	PIAA Semi-finals	Harrisburg 42, West Allegheny 10
2017	AAAAA	WPIAL 1st Round	McKeesport 22, West Allegheny 21

== Notable alumni ==
- Tyler Palko – Former NFL quarterback
- Dorin Dickerson- Former NFL tight end
- Scott Patterson – Former MLB pitcher
- C. J. Davis – Former NFL center
- Nick Kolarac – Professional Soccer Player
- Austin Hendrick – baseball outfielder
