= Pennsylvania Route 978 =

State highway in Allegheny County, Pennsylvania, US

Pennsylvania Route 978

Route information
- Maintained by PennDOT
- Length: 9.700 mi (15.611 km)
- Existed: 1928–present

Major junctions
- South end: PA 50 in South Fayette Township
- North end: US 22 / US 30 near Imperial-Enlow

Location
- Country: United States
- State: Pennsylvania
- Counties: Allegheny

Highway system
- Pennsylvania State Route System; Interstate; US; State; Scenic; Legislative
← PA 977	→ PA 979

Pennsylvania Route 978 (PA 978) is a 9.7-mile-long (15.6 km) north–south state highway located in western Allegheny County, Pennsylvania. The southern terminus of the route is at PA 50 in the vicinity of the Cecil area (of Washington County, although the road remains in Allegheny County) and of the Gladden area. The highway heads slightly to the northwest, and reaches the northern terminus at the interchange with U.S. Route 22 (US 22) and US 30 in the Imperial-Enlow area.

== Route description ==
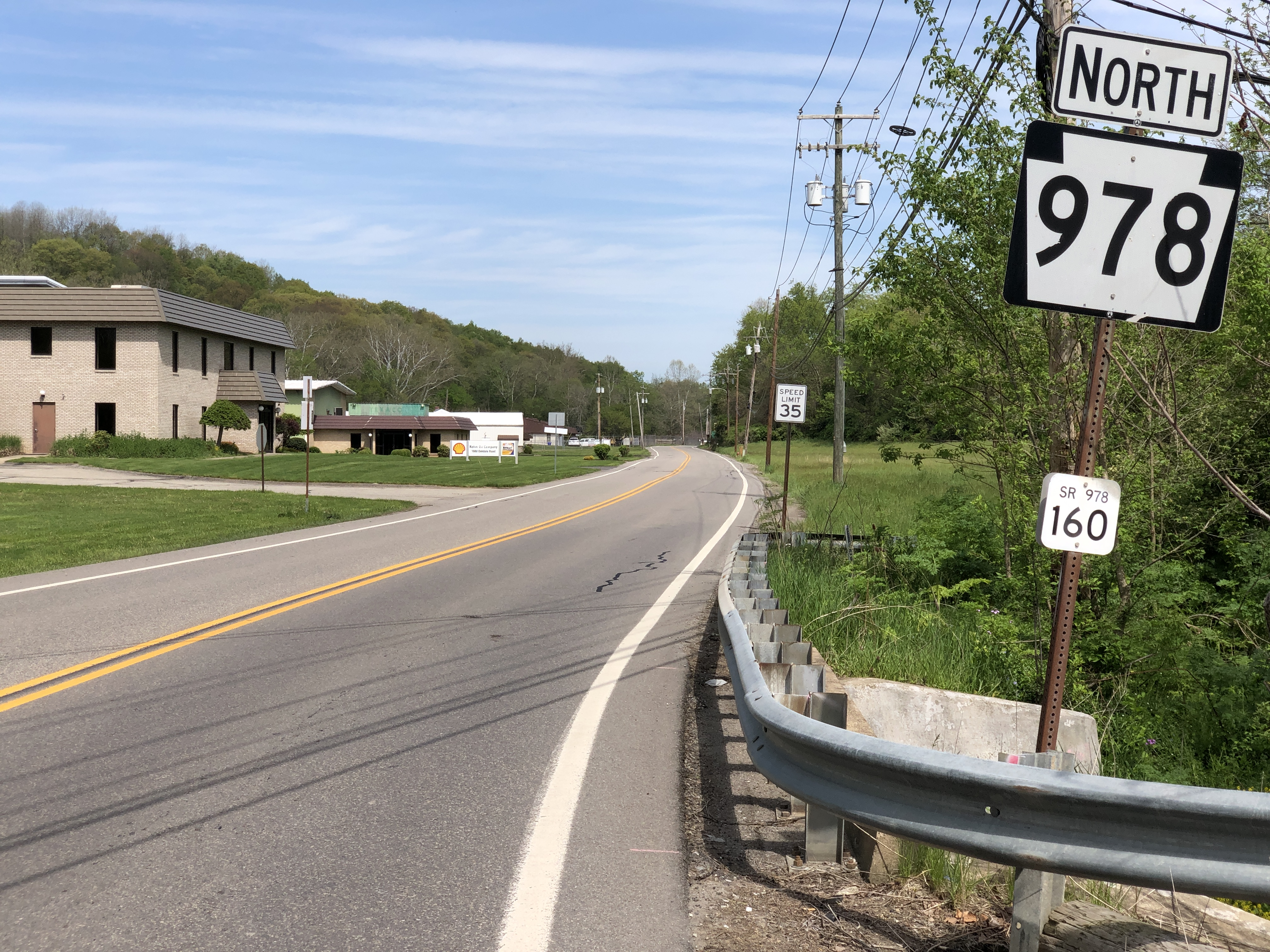
PA 978 northbound in North Fayette Township

PA 978 begins at a signalized intersection with PA 50. It heads north and crosses a Wheeling and Lake Erie Railway line at an at-grade crossing. Shortly after this, PA 978 curves northeast paralleling the railroad and Millers Run. The road then turns north after intersecting Millers Run Road.

When meeting Robinson Run Road, the road turns due east, and then turns west at its intersection with Battle Ridge Road, the south end of the concurrency with the Orange Belt. It later reaches the borough of Oakdale, where there is an intersection with Noblestown Road. At a fork with McKee Road north of Oakdale, PA 978 keeps left, while the Orange Belt keeps right toward the Pittsburgh Technical College. The road later turns west at Oakdale Road and turns north after intersecting North Branch Road. The route's northern terminus occurs at an interchange with US 22/US 30 in the Imperial-Enlow area.

== History ==
Old PA 978 was a road located in Imperial-Enlow. It existed for roughly 40 years and later was not renamed. It was commissioned in the 1930s and decommissioned in the mid 1970s. The growth of Pittsburgh International Airport partly led to PA 978 being realigned, and the old road later being closed to traffic, especially after the construction of the Midfield Temrinal in the 1990s. Enlow Road, now an Allegheny County maintained road, was one of the local roads that once carried PA 978. It also was one of the many roads that have disappeared with the expansion of the Pittsburgh International Airport. In Enlow, there is still is a few signs that keep the 978 designation alive. Old PA 978 begins at the Steubenville Pike south of the Robinson Town Centre just outside Imperial, and soon passes over the Montour Trail and merge with Cliff Mine Road. The road passes through several neighborhoods before encountering a fork, where the road keeps left. After passing by more neighborhoods for around three miles, the road travels by Interstate 376. The road ends at US 30.

== Major intersections ==
The entire route is in Allegheny County.

Location	mi	km	Destinations	Notes
South Fayette Township	0.00	0.00	PA 50 to I-79 – Cecil, Bridgeville	Southern terminus
South Fayette Township	4.38	7.05	Orange Belt (Battle Ridge Road) – Presto	South end of Orange Belt overlap
North Fayette Township	6.27	10.09	Orange Belt (McKee Road) – Pittsburgh Technical Institute	North end of Orange Belt overlap
North Fayette Township	9.70	15.61	US 22 / US 30 – Weirton, Pittsburgh, Imperial	Interchange; northern terminus
1.000 mi = 1.609 km; 1.000 km = 0.621 mi
