= West Allegheny High School =

West Allegheny Senior High School

Location
- 205 West Allegheny Road; Imperial, Pennsylvania, 15126; United States; 40.449°N 80.24°W

Information
- Funding type: Public
- School district: West Allegheny School District
- Principal: Cheryl McHone
- Teaching staff: 60.65 (FTE)
- Enrollment: 997 (2022–23)
- Student to teacher ratio: 16.44
- Colors: Scarlet and Grey
- Mascot: Indian
- Website: www.westasd.org/westalleghenyhighschool_home.aspx

West Allegheny High School is a public high school located in the West Allegheny School District in Allegheny County, Pennsylvania, United States. The school serves students in grades 9–12 from Findlay Township, North Fayette Township, and the Oakdale Borough. West Allegheny High School and West Allegheny Middle School are located on the main campus on West Allegheny Road in North Fayette.

== Extracurricular activities ==
The district offers a variety of clubs, activities and sports. The school's football team has gained notability by reaching play-off status during past years, and play divisional play-off games in Heinz Field. Through the 1960s and 1970s, West Allegheny shared an intense rivalry with Fort Cherry School District.

The West Allegheny softball team is also a notable sport as they made WPIAL 5A history by being the first 5A district champion after the WPIAL broke into six classifications. The softball team also won the first WPIAL championship in its programs history. The softball team went on to win three titles in a row from 2017 to 2019.

== Notable alumni ==
- Bob Palko - football coach
- Tyler Palko – Former NFL quarterback
- Dorin Dickerson- Former NFL tight end
- Scott Patterson – Former MLB pitcher
- C. J. Davis – Former NFL center
- Nick Kolarac – Professional Soccer Player
- Austin Hendrick – baseball outfielder
