= Imperial-Enlow, Pennsylvania =

Imperial-Enlow
- CDP
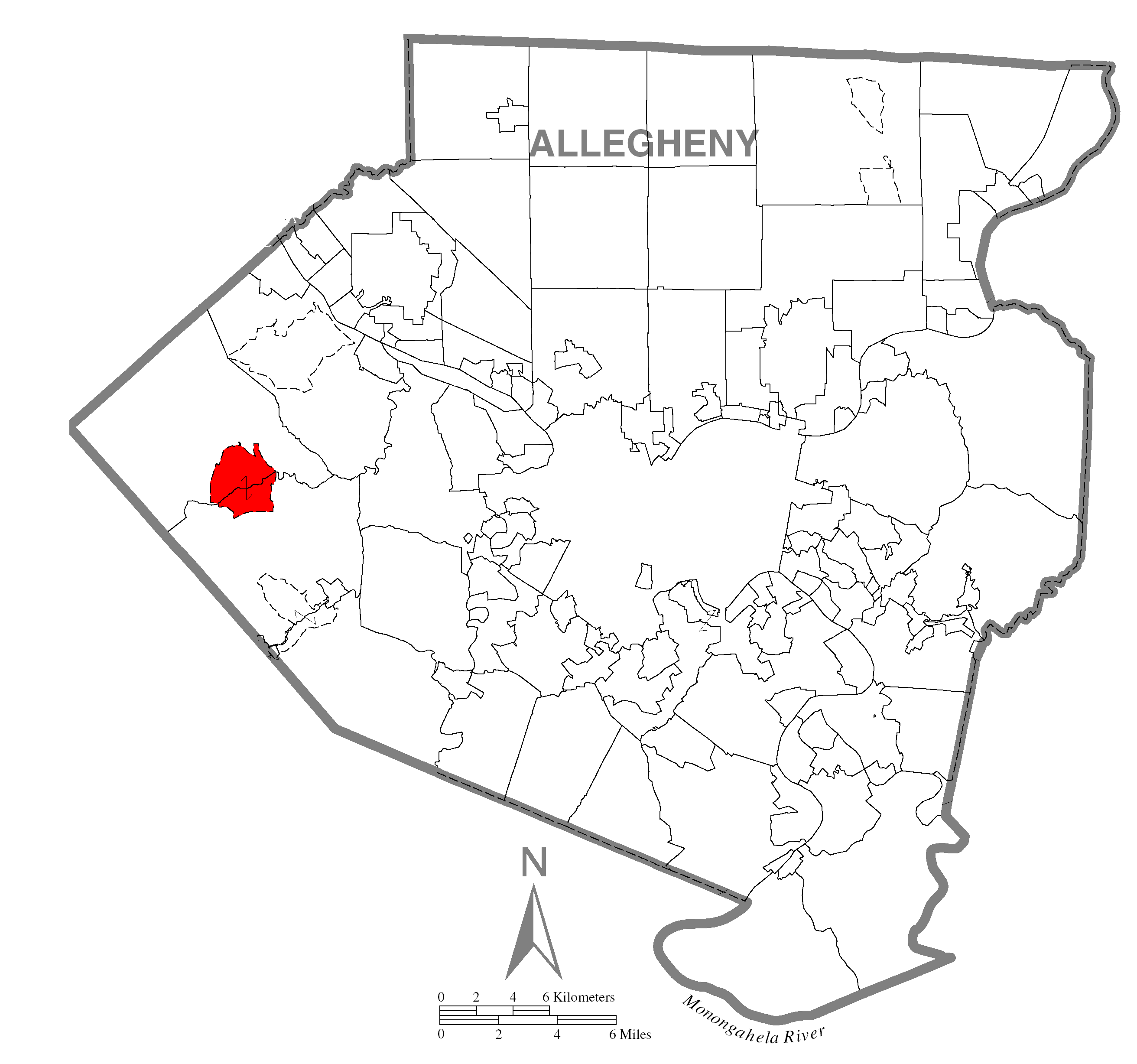
- Location within Allegheny county

- Location within the U.S. state of Pennsylvania Imperial-Enlow (the United States)
- Coordinates: 40°27′5″N 80°14′32″W
- Country: United States
- State: Pennsylvania
- County: Allegheny

Area
  - Total: 4.0 sq mi (10 km^{2})
  - Land: 4.0 sq mi (10 km^{2})

Population (2000)
  - Total: 3,514
  - Density: 880/sq mi (340/km^{2})
- Time zone: UTC-5 (Eastern (EST))
  - Summer (DST): UTC-4 (EDT)

Imperial-Enlow was a census-designated place (CDP) in Allegheny County, Pennsylvania, United States, for the 2000 census. The population at the time was 3,514. The 2010 census recognized two separate census-designated places, Imperial and Enlow.

The CDP was located in North Fayette and Findlay townships.

== Geography ==
Imperial-Enlow was located at 40°27′5″N 80°14′32″W (40.451404, -80.242353).

According to the United States Census Bureau, the CDP had a total area of 4.0 square miles (10 km^{2}), all of it land.

== Demographics ==
As of the census of 2000, there were 3,514 people, 1,418 households, and 979 families residing in the CDP. The population density was 869.6 people per square mile (335.8 people/km^{2}). There were 1,492 housing units at an average density of 369.2 per square mile (142.5/km^{2}). The racial makeup of the CDP was 96.41% White, 1.65% African American, 0.17% Native American, 0.57% Asian, 0.03% Pacific Islander, 0.17% from other races, and 1.00% from two or more races. Hispanic or Latino of any race were 0.48% of the population.

There were 1,418 households, out of which 34.8% had children under the age of 18 living with them, 51.0% were married couples living together, 13.4% had a female householder with no husband present, and 30.9% were non-families. 26.7% of all households were made up of individuals, and 10.7% had someone living alone who was 65 years of age or older. The average household size was 2.48 and the average family size was 3.02.

In the CDP, the population was spread out, with 26.1% under the age of 18, 6.7% from 18 to 24, 32.1% from 25 to 44, 22.6% from 45 to 64, and 12.5% who were 65 years of age or older. The median age was 38 years. For every 100 females, there were 94.4 males. For every 100 females age 18 and over, there were 88.3 males.

The median income for a household in the CDP was $40,668, and the median income for a family was $49,750. Males had a median income of $38,318 versus $26,171 for females. The per capita income for the CDP was $22,226. About 6.9% of families and 8.7% of the population were below the poverty line, including 12.5% of those under age 18 and 7.8% of those age 65 or over.
