= Tyler Palko =

American football player (born 1983)

No. 4
- Position: Quarterback

Personal information
- Born: August 9, 1983 (age 43); Imperial, Pennsylvania, U.S.
- Listed height: 6 ft 1 in (1.85 m)
- Listed weight: 215 lb (98 kg)

Career information
- High school: West Allegheny (Imperial)
- College: Pittsburgh (2002–2006)
- NFL draft: 2007: undrafted

Career history
- New Orleans Saints (2007); Arizona Cardinals (2009)*; California Redwoods (2009)*; Montreal Alouettes (2009); Pittsburgh Steelers (2009); Kansas City Chiefs (2010–2011)
- * Offseason or practice squad member only

Awards and highlights
- 2× Second-team Big East (2004, 2005); University of Pittsburgh Team MVP (2004)

Career NFL statistics
- Passing attempts: 140
- Passing completions: 84
- Completion percentage: 60.0%
- TD–INT: 2–7
- Passing yards: 831
- Passer rating: 60.7
- Stats at Pro Football Reference

Tyler Robert Palko (born August 9, 1983) is an American former professional football player who was a quarterback in the National Football League (NFL). Palko played college football as the starting quarterback for the Pittsburgh Panthers from 2004 to 2006. The left-handed thrower was not selected in the 2007 NFL draft, but was signed by the New Orleans Saints as an undrafted free agent. He also played for the Arizona Cardinals, Montreal Alouettes of the Canadian Football League (CFL), Pittsburgh Steelers, and Kansas City Chiefs.

== Early life ==
Palko graduated from West Allegheny High School in North Fayette, Pennsylvania, where he was named Associated Press 2001 Pennsylvania Big School Player of the Year. He was also a member of the USA Today All-America Team (Second-team) and three-time Pittsburgh Post-Gazette WPIAL Class AAA Player of the Year. Palko led his West Allegheny Indians to a PIAA state title in 2001 for AAA in Pennsylvania. At West Allegheny he played under his father, Bob Palko, earning four letters in football; additionally, he earned three letters in basketball and one in track and field. In his high school senior year, he was named 2002 YMCA Tribune-Review Scholar-Athlete honoree. In 2002, Palko was selected to play in the U.S. Army All-American Bowl, an all-star game for high school athletes.

== College career ==
Palko played at the University of Pittsburgh, where his career began in 2002 as a lettered true freshman. He completed 2-of-3 passes for 13 yards on the season, and rushed for an eight-yard touchdown late in Pitt's 2002 Insight Bowl victory over Oregon State.

Palko was redshirted the following season in 2003.

=== 2004 ===
As a redshirt-sophomore in 2004, Palko threw for 3,067 yards and 24 touchdowns, with only seven interceptions, earning him second-team All-Big East honors. He was also named Pittsburgh's MVP and offensive captain as a first-year starter. Palko's 24 touchdowns led the Big East and were the third-highest single-season total in program history, and his total passing yardage was the most ever for a sophomore and third-best overall in school history as well. Palko also had four 300-yard passing games and one 400-yard passing game during this season alone. In a game against South Florida, Palko threw for a career-high 411 yards, the fifth-highest in school history, and matched a personal best of five touchdowns with no interceptions. Palko threw another five touchdown passes and totaled 334 yards in the air with no interceptions against Notre Dame, becoming the first quarterback to throw for five touchdowns in a single game as a visiting team player against the Fighting Irish. Late in the fourth quarter against Notre Dame, the Panthers went on two late scoring drives: one for a touchdown and the second for a game-winning field goal with one second left to play. Palko also led three consecutive scoring drives against Temple to overcome a 10-point fourth quarter deficit. They also surprised West Virginia in the Backyard Brawl after being down 13–9 in the fourth quarter. Palko led a drive that consisted of four third-down conversions, ending with his two-yard touchdown run. Pittsburgh earned a bid to play in the Fiesta Bowl against the Utah Utes, where Palko was sacked nine times in a 35–7 loss.

After replacing Walt Harris as head coach in the spring of 2005, Dave Wannstedt chose Palko over Joe Flacco as the starting quarterback during Pitt's spring training. Flacco was left to run Pitt's second team and eventually transferred to Division I-AA University of Delaware. Flacco became the starting quarterback for the Baltimore Ravens in 2008, a year after Palko had been signed and subsequently waived by the Saints.

=== 2005 ===
As a junior in 2005, Palko earned second-team Big East honors for a second consecutive season and was also named Pitt's captain for the second year in a row. Palko's passing statistics were not as outstanding as the previous year's, with 2,392 yards and 17 touchdowns with nine interceptions. However, his six rushing touchdowns were a career-high and a team high for the season, and Palko was Pitt's third leading scorer with 36 points. Palko in week 2 against Ohio University threw two pick six TDs to Dion Byrum which ended up costing Pitt the game 16–10 to the Ohio University Bobcats. Palko's 371 yards and four passing touchdowns against Rutgers were season highs in 2005, while his 35 completions out of 58 attempts were both career highs. Against West Virginia, he threw for 308 yards with two touchdowns and two interceptions in a loss. Palko also threw for 198 yards and a touchdown against a strong opponent in the Louisville. In the season-opener against Notre Dame, Palko threw for 220 yards with one touchdown and one interception while rushing for a four-yard score as well.

=== 2006 ===
In his final season as a Panther in 2006, Palko threw for 2,871 yards (less than his 2004 and 2005 totals), but set a new career high with 25 touchdowns; he only rushed for 77 yards and two scores on the season. Palko and the Panthers opened the season against the Virginia with 283 yards passing and three touchdowns. Palko followed it up with a 267-yard game against Cincinnati, a 277-yard performance against Michigan State, and exceeded the 300-yard mark against The Citadel with 313 yards for four scores. Later in the season against West Virginia, Palko threw for a season high 341 yards along with two touchdowns in a 45–27 loss. In the season finale against Louisville, Palko threw for 307 yards and a touchdown, but was picked off three times as well. Palko's aerial yardage and passing efficiency rating of 163.2 was first in the conference, as were his completions per game. His ten 300-yard passing games during the season tied a Big East record set by Rutgers' Ryan Hart. He also ranked 4th in the NCAA in passing efficiency in 2006 with 163.2 (the leader was Colt Brennan with 186). Palko, along with linebacker H. B. Blades, were invited to attend the Senior Bowl at season's end.

Palko ended his college career tied for second in school history with Alex Van Pelt in career touchdown passes (66) and was second in Pitt history in career passing yardage, trailing Dan Marino by 254 yards. Palko's career totals of 8,343 passing yards with 66 touchdown passes rank him as one of the top three passers in Panther football history.

Palko graduated from the University of Pittsburgh in 2007 with a bachelor's degree in Communications and Rhetoric.

== Professional career ==
Pre-draft measurables
Height	Weight	Arm length	Hand span	40-yard dash	10-yard split	20-yard split	20-yard shuttle	Three-cone drill	Vertical jump	Broad jump
6 ft 1 3/8 in (1.86 m)	215 lb (98 kg)	32 1/2 in (0.83 m)	9 1/2 in (0.24 m)	4.85 s	1.75 s	2.86 s	4.36 s	7.05 s	31.5 in (0.80 m)	9 ft 4 in (2.84 m)
All values from NFL Combine

=== New Orleans Saints ===
Palko went undrafted in the 2007 NFL draft before signing with the New Orleans Saints on April 28, 2007. After the Saints released Palko during their final preseason cuts, he was back signed to the Saints' practice squad. He was then elevated to the 53-man roster for the team's first regular season game, where he was the team's third-string quarterback. After the game, he was released and re-signed to the team's practice squad. Palko was also promoted to the 53-man roster for the team's second contest, and was once again waived after the game. On October 9, 2007, Palko was signed back onto the Saints' practice squad. On December 30, 2007, Palko was signed onto the active roster for the final game of the season, but was declared inactive for the game.

Palko was waived for good by the Saints during final cuts on August 30, 2008.

=== Arizona Cardinals ===
After spending the 2008 NFL season out of football, Palko was signed to a future contract by the Arizona Cardinals on December 30, 2008. He was waived on September 4, 2009.

=== California Redwoods ===
On September 20, 2009, Palko was signed by the California Redwoods of the United Football League. He was cut during the preseason.

=== Montreal Alouettes ===
In October 2009, he signed with the Montreal Alouettes of the Canadian Football League and was placed on their practice roster. He was signed to the active roster on November 2, only to be released on November 25, allowing him to sign with the Pittsburgh Steelers.

=== Pittsburgh Steelers ===
Palko was signed to the Pittsburgh Steelers' practice squad on November 25, 2009, after quarterbacks Ben Roethlisberger and Charlie Batch were injured. He was promoted to the active roster on November 28 when both quarterbacks were declared inactive for the team's November 29 game against the Baltimore Ravens. Palko was named the back-up quarterback behind Dennis Dixon. He was released by the Steelers on December 9, 2009.

=== Kansas City Chiefs ===
==== 2010 ====
Palko was signed by the Kansas City Chiefs to a future contract on March 3, 2010.

On September 4, 2010, the Chiefs released Palko from the active roster, but signed him to the practice squad on the following day. He was elevated to the 53-man roster on December 8, 2010.

Palko played in the closing minutes of the Kansas City-San Diego game on December 12, 2010 (the Chiefs lost 31–0). He also played in the final minutes of the Oakland-Kansas City game on January 2, 2010 (the Chiefs lost 31–10). He passed for a total of 4 for 6 and 35 yards with no interceptions and was sacked twice.

==== 2011 ====
The Chiefs announced that Palko would take over starting quarterback duties against the New England Patriots in week 11 of the 2011 season, following a season ending index finger injury to starting quarterback Matt Cassel. Palko's first starting opportunity with the Chiefs resulted in a 34–3 loss to the Patriots at Gillette Stadium, where he completed 25 of 38 passes for a total of 236 yards and three interceptions. The following week, the Chiefs claimed Kyle Orton off waivers from the Denver Broncos.

Palko started the next game against the Pittsburgh Steelers, which received considerable interest in Pittsburgh given his collegiate roots. Palko went 18 of 28 for 167 yards and had three interceptions, including one in the closing seconds as Kansas City was driving into Steeler territory. The game ended in a 13–9 loss for the Chiefs that was surprisingly close (the Steelers were 10-point favorites).

Palko threw his first NFL touchdown pass the following week against the Chicago Bears: a 38-yard Hail Mary pass to Dexter McCluster as time expired at the end of the first half. This pass turned out to be the game-winning play. Orton, who was the starting quarterback for Chicago in 2008, had replaced Palko in the second quarter, but hurt a finger on his throwing hand. Palko returned and finished the Chiefs' upset of the Bears, 10–3, completing 17 of 30 passes for 157 yards and the McCluster touchdown pass.

In the December 11 game against the New York Jets, Palko only had 4 yards of total offense and one first down in the first half, completing 3 of 8 passes for 11 yards and one interception as the Jets jumped to a 28–3 lead. In the second half Palko threw for his second career NFL touchdown, a 24-yard toss to Jerheme Urban. Palko was also sacked five times in the game, which the Chiefs lost 37–10.

Following the Jets game, the Chiefs fired head coach Todd Haley. Interim head coach Romeo Crennel benched Palko and said that either Orton or Ricky Stanzi would start the December 18 game against the Green Bay Packers. Orton was selected and played a complete game against the previously unbeaten Packers, who the Chiefs upset 19–14. On March 13, 2012, Palko was non tendered by the Chiefs making him a free agent.

== Career statistics ==
=== NFL ===
Year	Team	Games		Passing								Rushing				Sacks		Fumbles	
Year	Team	GP	GS	Cmp	Att	Pct	Yds	Avg	TD	Int	Rtg	Att	Yds	Avg	TD	Sck	Yds	Fum	Lost
2010	KC	2	0	4	6	66.7	35	5.8	0	0	81.9	2	5	2.5	0	2	10	0	0
2011	KC	6	4	80	134	59.7	796	5.9	2	7	59.8	5	5	1.0	0	11	83	1	1
Total		8	4	84	140	60.0	831	5.9	2	7	60.7	7	20	2.9	0	13	93	1	1

=== College ===
Season	Team	GP	Passing							Rushing		
Season	Team	GP	Cmp	Att	Pct	Yds	TD	Int	Rtg	Att	Yds	TD
2002	Pittsburgh Panthers	8	2	3	67	13	0	0	103.1	10	9	1
2003	Pittsburgh Panthers	0	Redshirted									
2004	Pittsburgh Panthers	12	230	409	56	3,067	24	7	135.2	129	139	3
2005	Pittsburgh Panthers	11	193	341	57	2,392	17	9	126.7	70	-139	6
2006	Pittsburgh Panthers	12	220	322	68	2,871	25	9	163.2	66	77	2
Totals		43	645	1,075	60	8,343	66	25	140.8	275	86	12

Notes: Uses NCAA (rather than NFL) passer rating model. The NCAA indicates he played one game (bringing his total Pittsburgh career games played to 44) in 2003, but was redshirted that year without any record of passes or rushes. His official Panther biography says he did not play at all in 2003.

== Broadcasting career ==
Palko does weekly broadcasts for Pittsburgh Panthers Television on Comcast.
