= Margaret Buchanan Cole =

American mathematician (1885–1959)

- Born: Margaret Buchanan; August 18, 1885; Clinton, Pennsylvania
- Died: September 10, 1959 (aged 74); Morgantown, West Virginia
- Education: West Virginia University; Bryn Mawr College
- Occupation: Mathematics educator
- Known for: Math PhD before World War II
- Spouse: Harry Outen Cole

Margaret Buchanan Cole (August 18, 1885 – September 10, 1959) was an American mathematician and was one of the few women to achieve a PhD in mathematics before World War II. She retired from West Virginia University as a professor emeritus in 1955.

== Life and work ==
Margaret Buchanan was the second of three children born in Clinton, Pennsylvania, to Sarah Wiley and Aaron Moore Buchanan, a minister. In 1886, the family moved from Pennsylvania to Morgantown, West Virginia. From 1898 to 1902 Margaret Buchanan attended the preparatory school of West Virginia University (WVU) and then enrolled as one of the few women attending the university as a student in 1902. She was a member of many clubs and a founder of the Beta Upsilon chapter of the sorority Kappa Kappa Gamma.

In 1906, she graduated with her bachelor's degree from WVU in 1906 and started teaching math at Marshall College in Huntington, West Virginia. She returned to WVU in 1907 as a graduate student and taught math there 1909–1912. She enrolled at Bryn Mawr College as a graduate student in 1918 and was awarded a President M. Carey Thomas European fellowship in 1918–1919 but she postponed that award for a year until she could combine it with another fellowship she received from the Association of Collegiate Alumnae European fellowship in 1920–1921. The awards allowed her to attend the Sorbonne in Paris where she studied under Édouard Goursat, Henri Lebesgue, and Émile Picard in mathematics and under Marie Curie and Gabriel Lippmann in physics.

In June 1922 at Bryn Mawr, she completed work on her PhD in math with a minor in physics under the direction of Anna J. Pell Wheeler. Her dissertation was titled, Systems of Two Linear Integral Equations with Two Parameters and Symmetrizable Kernels.

PhD in hand, she returned to teach at West Virginia University as assistant professor and was promoted to associate professor in 1925. On February 14, 1929 she resigned her position and married an old acquaintance, Harry Outen Cole, a widowed engineer who played a role in the design of the Panama Canal.

In 1938, using her new name Margaret Buchanan Cole, she rejoined the WVU faculty and held several positions: instructor 1938–1941, assistant professor 1941–1952 and associate professor 1952–1955. With her retirement in 1955 at age 69 she was promoted to professor emeritus. Cole was an active alumna of the university and became the first woman president of the WVU alumni association in June 1939 after serving four years on the alumni executive council.

Margaret Buchanan Cole died in Morgantown in 1959.

== Tribute ==
The Margaret Buchanan Cole Young Alumni Award honored a WVU alumnus or alumna who graduated within the last 10 years and provided outstanding service for their alma mater. The award noted it was named for the founder of WVU's Kappa Kappa Gamma sorority and the first woman to serve as president of the Alumni Association. It was last awarded in 2015.
