= Clinton, Pennsylvania =

Unincorporated community in Pennsylvania, US

- Census-designated place
- Location in Allegheny County and state of Pennsylvania
- Coordinates: 40°29′24″N 80°17′38″W
- Country: United States
- State: Pennsylvania
- County: Allegheny
- Township: Findlay

Area
  - Total: 0.92 sq mi (2.39 km^{2})
  - Land: 0.92 sq mi (2.39 km^{2})
  - Water: 0 sq mi (0.00 km^{2})

Population (2020)
  - Total: 905
  - Density: 979.7/sq mi (378.26/km^{2})
- Time zone: UTC-5 (Eastern (EST))
  - Summer (DST): UTC-4 (EDT)
- ZIP codes: 15026
- FIPS code: 42-14296

Clinton is a census-designated place in Findlay Township, Allegheny County, Pennsylvania, United States. It had a population of 905 at the 2020 census. The community is located adjacent to the Pittsburgh International Airport within the Pittsburgh metropolitan area.

== History ==
In mid-2014 the Pittsburgh Post-Gazette opened a large printing plant in Clinton.

== Demographics ==
Clinton has a population of 905 as of the 2020 census. The employment rate is 70.2 percent, and approximately 44.1 percent of residents have a bachelor's degree or higher. 4.5 percent lack health insurance. The 461 families in the ZCTA are spread across 399 houses, which have a median household income of $89,086. The 4,071 residents of the ZCTA have a median age of 35.6, below Pennsylvania's median age of 40.9. The population is nearly all white and are descended from Europe, with a plurality of them descended from Germany. There are additionally, large sectors of English Americans, Italian Americans, Polish Americans, and Irish Americans. In addition, there are small minorities of French Americans and Scottish Americans. Only 3.7 percent of the population is foreign-born, all of whom are naturalized American citizens.

=== Political affiliation ===
In the 2020 presidential election, Clinton and its nearby communities voted mostly for Republican Donald Trump over Democrat Joe Biden. The margin in support of Trump was 28 percentage points, though the area supported Biden slightly more than Hillary Clinton in the 2016 election.

Historical population
Census	Pop.	Note	%±
2010	434		—
2020	905		108.5%
U.S. Decennial Census

== Education ==
Children in Clinton are served by the West Allegheny School District. The current schools serving the community are:

- Wilson Elementary School – grades K–5
- West Allegheny Middle School – grades 6–8
- West Allegheny Senior High School – grades 9–12

== Infrastructure and transportation ==
=== Services ===
Clinton contains the United States Post Office for ZIP Code 15026. Electrical services are provided by either Duquesne Light Company or Allegheny Energy. The Findlay Township Police Department is headquartered in Clinton.

=== Transportation ===
Clinton is bisected by U.S. Route 30, which serves as the Main Street for the CDP. Due to its proximity to Pittsburgh International Airport, many of the same expressways which serve the airport also serve Clinton, including designated exits for Clinton on Interstate 376 and Pennsylvania Route 576. General aviation travelers not able to use Pittsburgh International Airport are also able to use Allegheny County Airport if needed. No public transportation service to Clinton exists.
