= Scott Patterson (baseball) =

American baseball player (born 1979)

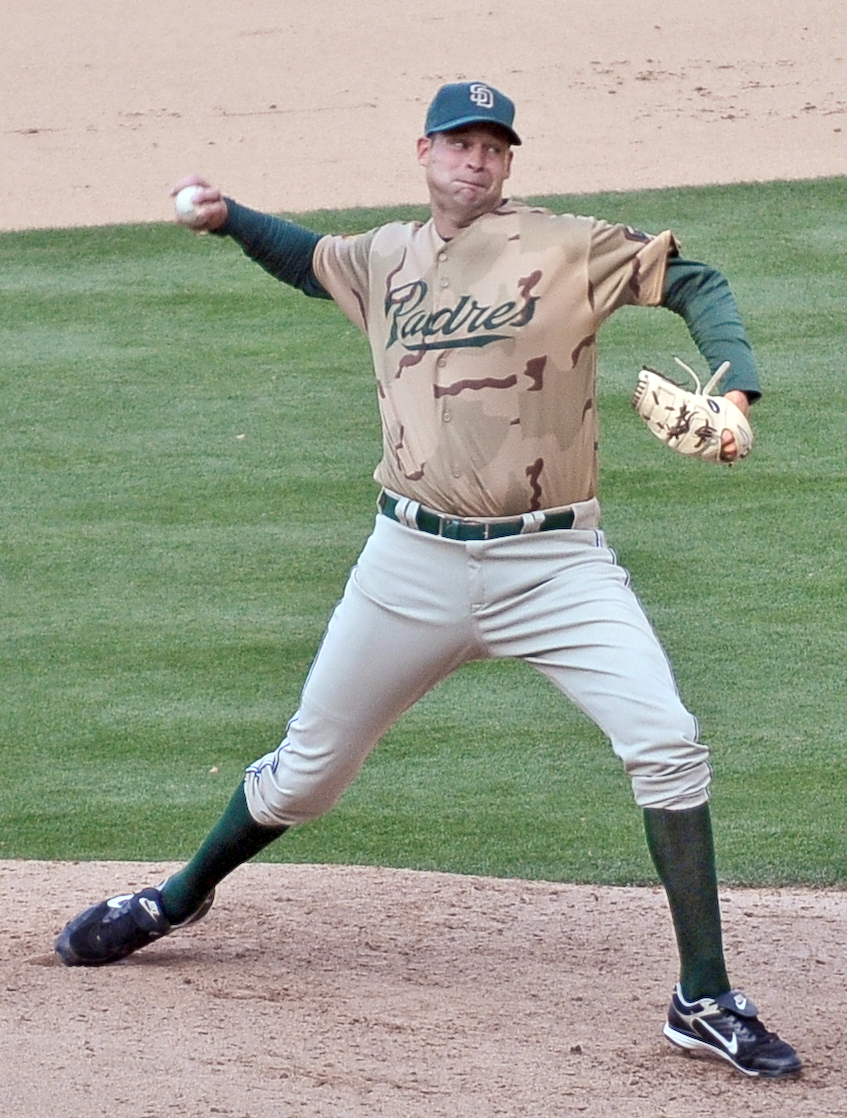
- Patterson with the San Diego Padres
- Pitcher
- Born: June 20, 1979 (age 46); Oakdale, Pennsylvania, U.S.
- Batted: Right Threw: Right

MLB debut
- June 1, 2008, for the New York Yankees

Last MLB appearance
- September 18, 2008, for the San Diego Padres

MLB statistics
- Win–loss record: 0–0
- Earned run average: 1.93
- Strikeouts: 7
- Stats at Baseball Reference

Teams
- New York Yankees (2008); San Diego Padres (2008)
Medals
Men's baseball
Representing United States
Pan American Games
Silver medal – second place	2011 Guadalajara	National team

Scott Robert Patterson (born June 20, 1979) is an American former professional baseball pitcher. He played in Major League Baseball (MLB) for the New York Yankees and San Diego Padres.

== Early life ==
Patterson grew up in the Pittsburgh suburb of Oakdale, Pennsylvania, where his dad and brother currently live. He attended West Allegheny High School where he still holds the single season strikeout record. Following high school, he attended Allegany College of Maryland in Cumberland, Maryland. Afterward, he attended West Virginia State, where, during his senior season he threw a perfect game and was also awarded the 2002 WVIAC Pitcher of the Year.

== Career ==
=== New York Yankees ===
Patterson was re-signed by the New York Yankees as a free agent on November 16, 2007, after spending most of the previous two seasons with their Double-A affiliate, the Trenton Thunder. Prior to spending time in the Yankees organization, he was in the Frontier League, an independent baseball league, for 4 1/2 seasons.

On June 1, 2008, Patterson was called up to the major leagues for the first time and made his major league debut for the Yankees that day in a loss to the Minnesota Twins. Patterson was optioned back to the minors on June 3, after only pitching in one game. He was designated for assignment by the Yankees on September 8.

=== San Diego Padres ===
On September 11, 2008, Patterson was claimed off waivers by the San Diego Padres. He would end up pitching in three games for the Padres in September.

=== Oakland Athletics ===
On August 20, 2009, Patterson was traded to the Oakland Athletics in exchange for cash considerations.

=== Boston Red Sox ===
On January 7, 2010, Patterson signed a minor league contract with the Boston Red Sox.

=== Seattle Mariners ===
On November 24, 2010, Patterson signed with the Seattle Mariners on a minor league contract. He split the 2011 season between the Double-A Jackson Generals and Triple-A Tacoma Rainiers, accumulating a 4–4 record and 3.54 ERA with 77 strikeouts and 19 saves.

=== New York Mets ===
On August 5, 2012, Patterson joined the New York Mets organization and was assigned to the Triple-A Buffalo Bisons. In two starts for Buffalo, he struggled to an 0–1 record and 21.60 ERA with two strikeouts across 1 2/3 innings pitched. Patterson was released by the Mets organization on August 16.

=== New Britain Bees ===
On March 31, 2016, Patterson signed with the New Britain Bees of the Atlantic League of Professional Baseball.

He retired from playing after the 2016 season and was named pitching coach for the Lancaster Barnstormers.
