= Bob Palko =

American football coach

- Born: Pennsylvania, U.S.
- Education: Montana Technological University
- Occupations: Football coach, educator
- Years active: 1980s–present
- Known for: High school football coaching
- Awards: Don Shula NFL High School Coach of the Year (2021)

Robert Palko is an American football coach who is currently the head football coach at West Allegheny High School. Palko has won nine WPIAL championships and two PIAA state championships as a head coach of both West Allegheny and Mt. Lebanon High School.

== Early life and education ==
Palko graduated from West Allegheny High School in 1978, where he was a three-sport athlete. He received a football scholarship to Montana Technological University in Butte, Montana, where he was a four-year starting quarterback.

== Coaching career ==
Palko began his coaching career at Indiana University of Pennsylvania under head coach George Chaump. He then went on to hold coaching positions at Jeannette High School, Seton-La Salle High School, and Duquesne University.

=== West Allegheny ===
In 1995, Palko became head football coach at his alma mater, West Allegheny High School, at the age of 35. During 24 seasons at West Allegheny, his teams won eight WPIAL championships, reached the PIAA state championship game twice, and won the 2001 PIAA Class AAA state championship. His record at West Allegheny was 217–73.

Palko retired from coaching following the 2018 season after 24 seasons at West Allegheny. He returned to coaching in 2019 when he was hired as head football coach at Mt. Lebanon High School.

=== Mt. Lebanon ===
Palko coached Mt. Lebanon from 2019 through the 2022 season. In 2021, he led the Blue Devils to a 15–0 record, the WPIAL Class 6A championship and the PIAA Class 6A state championship, where they defeated three-time defending champion St. Joseph's Prep. The state championship was the first in the school's history.

The 2021 season gave Palko his ninth WPIAL championship as a head coach, tying him for the most WPIAL football championships in league history at the time. He also became one of a small number of coaches to win PIAA state championships at two different schools.

Following the 2021 season, Palko was named the NFL's Don Shula NFL High School Coach of the Year.

Palko left Mt. Lebanon following the 2022 season and joined Penn State University as director of high school football relations.

In 2026, he was rehired as head football coach at West Allegheny.

== Coaching record and honors ==
Palko has coached in several different high school all-star games, including the Big 33 Football Classic, the East–West All-Star Game and the U.S. Army All-American Bowl. He has also served as president of the Pennsylvania Scholastic Football Coaches Association and has been a member of the Western Pennsylvania Sports Hall of Fame.

== Personal life ==
Palko is the father of former University of Pittsburgh quarterback Tyler Palko and former college football player Luke Palko. Tyler Palko played quarterback at Pittsburgh and later played professionally in the National Football League and Canadian Football League.
