= Robert Morris University =

Private university in Moon Township, Pennsylvania, U.S.

- Former names: Pittsburgh School of Accountancy (1921–1935); Robert Morris School of Business (1935–1962); Robert Morris Junior College (1962–1969); Robert Morris College (1969–2002)
- Type: Private university
- Established: 1921
- Endowment: $53.9 million (2025)
- President: Michelle L. Patrick
- Faculty: 162 full-time faculty
- Undergraduates: 3,769
- Postgraduates: 968
- Location: Moon Township, Pennsylvania, U.S. 40.5206°N 80.2107°W
- Campus: Suburban, 230 acres (93 ha)
- Colors: Blue, white, red
- Nickname: Colonials
- Sporting affiliations: NCAA Division I – Horizon League
- Mascot: RoMo
- Website: www.rmu.edu

Robert Morris University (RMU) is a private university in Moon Township, Pennsylvania, United States. It was founded in 1921 and is named after Robert Morris, known as the "financier of the American Revolution". It enrolls nearly 5,000 students and offers 60 bachelor's degree programs and 35 master's and doctoral programs.

== History ==
Robert Morris University originated in 1921 as the Pittsburgh School of Accountancy, founded by Andrew Blass using a curriculum similar to what he had overseen as dean of the Pace Institute in Washington, D.C. His successor, C.W. Salmond, oversaw an expansion in 1935 that added business and secretarial studies, and the school was renamed the Robert Morris School of Business in honor of the Founding Father popularly known as the "financier of the American Revolution." In 1942, the Robert Morris School moved to the William Penn Hotel to accommodate its growing enrollment, and in 1959 purchased its own Downtown building at 600 Fifth Ave.

In 1962 the school purchased Pine Hill Manor and Farm in Moon Township, Pennsylvania, formerly the home of Oliver Kaufmann, vice president of Kaufmann's department store in Pittsburgh, his wife, Freda, and their children. The Commonwealth of Pennsylvania then granted the school permission to award associate degrees, and the school became Robert Morris Junior College, operating from two separate campuses. The first new buildings on the Moon Township campus, Franklin Center and three residence halls, were erected in 1963.

The school became Robert Morris College in 1969 when it began offering bachelor's degrees in business administration. The first graduate students were admitted in 1978 for master's degree programs in business administration, taxation, and business teacher education; the first doctoral program was offered in 1999. In 2002, the school attained university status and was thus renamed Robert Morris University. In 2010, the university sold its Downtown Center at 600 Fifth Avenue to Duquesne University.

In 2016, Christopher B. Howard became the university's eighth president. Howard was formerly the president of Hampden-Sydney College and the first African-American president in RMU's history. He was succeeded by Michelle L. Patrick in 2022, the first woman to serve as RMU president.

== Campus ==
The core campus consists of a 230 acres (0.93 km^{2}) tract in Moon Township, Pennsylvania, a suburb of Pittsburgh near Pittsburgh International Airport. It is in the Carnot-Moon census-designated place.

Nearly 2,000 students live in campus housing, including 85 percent of freshmen.

The UPMC Events Center is the home of basketball and volleyball teams. The center also has extensive conference, classroom, and meeting facilities and is a venue for concerts, speakers, and other events. Football and lacrosse teams play on campus at Joe Walton Stadium.

Clearview Arena is the home of the men's and women's ice hockey teams at the RMU Island Sports Center, a 32 acres (130,000 m^{2}) sports and recreation facility at nearby Neville Island in the Ohio River 9 miles (14 km) from Downtown Pittsburgh. The center is open to the public year-round and contains two indoor and two outdoor ice rinks, an indoor hockey arena (home to the Steel City Icebergs), and a dome that accommodates an indoor golf driving range. The center also has an outdoor 18-hole miniature golf course.

The university also has classes online and with its Bayer Center for Nonprofit Management at Robert Morris University. The university offers training in additive manufacturing at a 3D printing lab and classroom in the Energy Innovation Center in the Lower Hill District.

== Academics ==
RMU offers 60 undergraduate and 35 graduate degree programs. It also offers 39 professionally focused certificate programs.

RMU was the first university in Pennsylvania to join the Amazon Web Service Academy and offer cloud computing certification curriculum. On October 7, 2022, the university announced that the school would be renamed the Rockwell School of Business. This was a result of an $18 million gift from the S. Kent Rockwell Foundation and the Kent Rockwell family, the largest personal gift in the university’s history.

To support students from underrepresented groups who want to pursue careers in technology or math, Netflix co-founder and CEO Reed Hastings made a $3 million gift in January 2021 to fund 20 full scholarships for RMU Next Century Scholars. The 20 scholarships were open to qualified applicants pursuing degrees in computer and information systems; cybersecurity; data analytics; actuarial science; mathematics; statistics and predictive analysis; computer science; and user experience user interface design (UX-UI).

In October 2022, Robert Morris University was one of two recipients of a record-setting $8.82 million gift from the Peirce Foundation for dyslexia education, the largest gift of its kind ever made in the state of Pennsylvania. The Peirce family previously committed $2 million to Robert Morris University in 2017 to establish the Bob and Joan Peirce Center for Structured Reading Teacher Training, which trains teachers to work with children with dyslexia and other learning disabilities.

Robert Morris University is accredited by the Middle States Commission on Higher Education. The School of Business is accredited by AACSB International. In 2022, Robert Morris University announced that it earned the AACSB Accounting accreditation, the first university in Western Pennsylvania to do so. B.S. programs in information sciences and computer information systems are accredited by the Computing Accreditation Commission of ABET, while B.S. programs in engineering and manufacturing engineering are accredited by ABET's Engineering Accreditation Commission. Initial teacher preparation and advanced educator programs are accredited by the Council for the Accreditation of Educator Preparation (CAEP). Nursing programs are accredited by the Commission on Collegiate Nursing Education, and nuclear medicine by the Joint Review Committee on Education Programs in Nuclear Medicine Technology; the Regional Research and Innovation in Simulation Education (RISE) Center at Robert Morris University is accredited by the Council for Accreditation of Healthcare Simulation Programs.

== Student life ==
Most students are from the Pittsburgh area, while 16 percent of freshmen in 2018 were from outside Pennsylvania. RMU offers more than 160 student organizations, clubs, and activities on campus. The Colonial Theatre program stages several productions annually, including some that have won honors at the Kennedy Center American College Theater Festival. The RMU Bands and Performing Ensembles features a marching show band, pep band, jazz band, wind ensemble, and fife & drum corps. The band's auxiliary includes a color guard, dance team, and majorette squad.

Students field 17 club sports teams including ice hockey, bowling, rugby and golf. There are several fraternities and sororities on campus.

The student-run RMU Sentry Media website includes news and feature stories as well as programming from RMU-TV and RMU-Radio. The Sentry's sports affiliate, Colonial Sports Network, provides athletics news.

== Athletics ==
Robert Morris' sports teams, nicknamed "the Colonials", wear the school colors of blue, white, and red. The Colonials compete in NCAA Division I (FCS, formerly Division I-AA, in football). Most of the school's teams play in the Horizon League, though the football and Men’s Lacrosse teams play in the Northeast Conference. The men's and women's ice hockey teams compete in Atlantic Hockey America, and women's rowing competes in the Metro Atlantic Athletic Conference. Men's teams are basketball, football, golf, ice hockey, lacrosse, cross country, and soccer. Women's teams are basketball, cross country, ice hockey, lacrosse, rowing, soccer, softball, track and field, and volleyball.

The Colonials officially joined the NCAA in 1976 and appeared in its first NCAA tournament in 1982, in men's basketball. Robert Morris men's and women's teams have won 45 league championships in NCAA Division I.

== Notable alumni ==
- Olubowale Victor Akintimehin, rapper
- Max Baer, Pennsylvania Supreme Court Justice (2003-2022)
- Charlie Batch, motivational speaker and football player
- Kevin Colbert, general manager of the Pittsburgh Steelers
- William J. Coyne, Former member of the United States House of Representatives
- Hank Fraley, football player and coach
- Phyllis Hyman, R&B, disco, and soul singer
- Brianne McLaughlin, women's ice hockey goalie
- Robin R. Sanders, United States Ambassador to the Republic of the Congo (2003-2005) and Nigeria (2007–2010)
- Kirsten Welsh, hockey player
- Chevy Woods, rapper
- Jason Ortitay, Pennsylvania State Representative
