= Carnot-Moon, Pennsylvania =

Unincorporated community in Pennsylvania, US

- Census-designated place
- Location in Allegheny County and state of Pennsylvania
- Coordinates: 40°31′4″N 80°12′42″W
- Country: United States
- State: Pennsylvania
- County: Allegheny
- Township: Moon

Area
  - Total: 5.98 sq mi (15.49 km^{2})
  - Land: 5.98 sq mi (15.49 km^{2})
  - Water: 0 sq mi (0.00 km^{2})

Population (2020)
  - Total: 13,151
  - Density: 2,200/sq mi (849/km^{2})
- Time zone: UTC-5 (Eastern (EST))
  - Summer (DST): UTC-4 (EDT)
- ZIP code: 15108
- Area code: 878
- FIPS code: 42-11348

Carnot-Moon is a census-designated place (CDP) in central Moon Township, Pennsylvania, United States. The population was 13,151 at the 2020 census.

== Geography ==
Carnot-Moon is at 40°31′4″N 80°12′42″W (40.517800, -80.211649).

According to the United States Census Bureau, the CDP has a total area of 6.0 square miles (16 km^{2}), all land. It lies entirely within Moon Township.

== Demographics ==
Historical population
Census	Pop.	Note	%±
2020	13,151		—
U.S. Decennial Census

=== 2020 census ===
As of the 2020 census, Carnot-Moon had a population of 13,151. The median age was 32.4 years. 17.6% of residents were under the age of 18 and 13.8% of residents were 65 years of age or older. For every 100 females there were 105.4 males, and for every 100 females age 18 and over there were 103.7 males age 18 and over.

100.0% of residents lived in urban areas, while 0.0% lived in rural areas.

There were 5,072 households in Carnot-Moon, of which 26.4% had children under the age of 18 living in them. Of all households, 42.0% were married-couple households, 25.0% were households with a male householder and no spouse or partner present, and 25.5% were households with a female householder and no spouse or partner present. About 35.4% of all households were made up of individuals and 11.2% had someone living alone who was 65 years of age or older.

There were 5,466 housing units, of which 7.2% were vacant. The homeowner vacancy rate was 1.4% and the rental vacancy rate was 8.5%.

Racial composition as of the 2020 census
Race	Number	Percent
White	9,909	75.3%
Black or African American	1,042	7.9%
American Indian and Alaska Native	37	0.3%
Asian	827	6.3%
Native Hawaiian and Other Pacific Islander	4	0.0%
Some other race	305	2.3%
Two or more races	1,027	7.8%
Hispanic or Latino (of any race)	805	6.1%

=== 2000 census ===
At the 2000 census there were 10,637 people, 4,327 households, and 2,544 families living in the CDP. The population density was 1,781.9 people per square mile (688.0 people/km^{2}). There were 4,943 housing units at an average density of 828.0 per square mile (319.7/km^{2}). The racial makeup of the CDP was 90.32% White, 5.31% African American, 0.11% Native American, 2.69% Asian, 0.05% Pacific Islander, 0.32% from other races, and 1.20% from two or more races. Hispanic or Latino of any race were 1.05%.

There were 4,327 households, 24.0% had children under the age of 18 living with them, 48.2% were married couples living together, 7.7% had a female householder with no husband present, and 41.2% were non-families. 34.6% of households were made up of individuals, and 7.6% were one person aged 65 or older. The average household size was 2.19 and the average family size was 2.85.

The age distribution was 18.1% under the age of 18, 16.8% from 18 to 24, 29.8% from 25 to 44, 23.2% from 45 to 64, and 12.1% 65 or older. The median age was 35 years. For every 100 females, there were 101.3 males. For every 100 females age 18 and over, there were 100.8 males.

The median household income was $49,436 and the median family income was $62,045. Males had a median income of $43,855 versus $30,130 for females. The per capita income for the CDP was $23,960. About 2.7% of families and 5.0% of the population were below the poverty line, including 4.9% of those under age 18 and 1.3% of those age 65 or over.

== Education ==
It is in the Moon Area School District.

Robert Morris University is in the CDP.
