= Don Shula NFL High School Coach of the Year =

American football coaching award

The Don Shula NFL High School Coach of the Year award is awarded annually to a high school football head coach in the United States that displays "the integrity, achievement, and leadership exemplified by the winningest coach in NFL history, Don Shula." It was created by the National Football League Foundation and first awarded for 2010, known then as the Don Shula NFL Coach of the Year Award, and coaches from the high school, college, and professional levels were eligible to receive it. It became an exclusively high school award in 2011 when it was awarded as part of the 1st NFL Honors. Each of the 32 teams in the National Football League nominate a high school coach for each season's award. Two finalists each receive $15,000 from the NFL Foundation with $10,000 going to the schools' football programs. The award was designed and sculpted by artist Stephanie Borgese. Beginning in 2022, the league began awarding two coaches, one from each conference, every year.

== Winners ==
| Year | Winner | School | Nominated by | Ref |
|---|---|---|---|---|
| 2010 | Ray Seals | Madison (TX) | Houston Texans | |
| 2011 | John McKissick | Summerville (SC) | Carolina Panthers | |
| 2012 | Steve Specht | St. Xavier (OH) | Seattle Seahawks | |
| 2013 | Mike Grant | Eden Prairie (MN) | Minnesota Vikings | |
| 2014 | Bruce Larson | Somerset (WI) | Green Bay Packers | |
| 2015 | Michael Burnett | Tuscarora (VA) | Washington Redskins | |
| 2016 | Randy Allen | Highland Park (TX) | Dallas Cowboys | |
| 2017 | Robert Garrett | Crenshaw (CA) | Los Angeles Chargers | |
| 2018 | Gabe Infante | St. Joseph's (PA) | Philadelphia Eagles | |
| 2019 | Matt Land | Dalton High School (GA) | Atlanta Falcons | |
| 2020 | Derrick Avery | Booker T. Washington (GA) | Atlanta Falcons | |
| 2021 | Bob Palko | Mt. Lebanon (PA) | Pittsburgh Steelers | |
| 2022 | Clive Harding | Boys and Girls (NY) | New York Jets (AFC) | |
| 2022 | Matt Gallagher | Maine-Endwell (NY) | New York Giants (NFC) | |
| 2023 | Andy Lowry | Columbine (CO) | Denver Broncos (AFC) | |
| 2023 | Shane Fairfield | Muskegon (MI) | Detroit Lions (NFC) | |
| 2024 | John Hart | Brownsburg (IN) | Indianapolis Colts (AFC) | |
| 2024 | Bill Jacklin | Slinger (WI) | Green Bay Packers (NFC) | |
