= Dorin Dickerson =

American football player (born 1988)

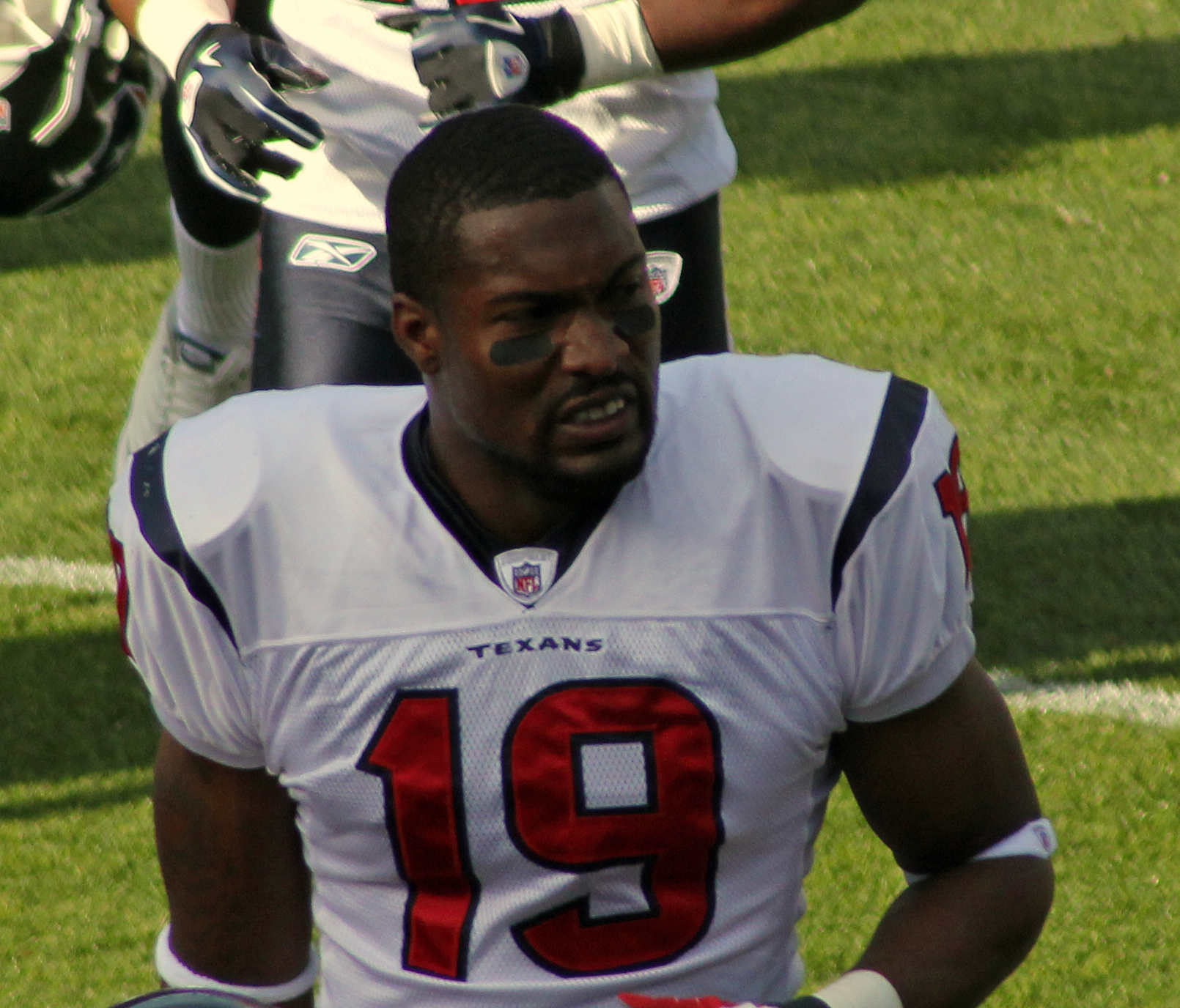
- Dickerson with the Houston Texans in 2010

No. 19, 42, 82
- Position: Wide receiver / Tight end

Personal information
- Born: March 31, 1988 (age 38); Imperial, Pennsylvania, U.S.
- Listed height: 6 ft 1 in (1.85 m)
- Listed weight: 226 lb (103 kg)

Career information
- High school: West Allegheny (Imperial)
- College: Pittsburgh
- NFL draft: 2010: 7th round, 227th overall pick

Career history
- Houston Texans (2010); Pittsburgh Steelers (2011)*; New England Patriots (2011)*; Buffalo Bills (2012); Detroit Lions (2013); Tennessee Titans (2014–2015)
- * Offseason or practice squad member only

Awards and highlights
- First-team All-American (2009)

Career NFL statistics
- Receptions: 11
- Receiving yards: 151
- Stats at Pro Football Reference

Dorin R. Dickerson (born March 31, 1988) is an American former professional football player who was a tight end and wide receiver in the National Football League (NFL). He played college football for the Pittsburgh Panthers. He was selected by the Houston Texans in the seventh round of the 2010 NFL draft. He was also a member of the Pittsburgh Steelers, New England Patriots, Buffalo Bills, Detroit Lions and Tennessee Titans.

== Early life ==
Dickerson attended West Allegheny High School in Imperial, Pennsylvania, where he played a variety of positions, including wide receiver, running back, quarterback, defensive back and kick returner. As a senior, he rushed for 1,429 yards on 182 carries (7.9 avg.) and scored 30 touchdowns, while also having 22 receptions for 423 yards (19.2 avg.) with six touchdowns. On defense, he intercepted four passes. Dickerson was named AP Pennsylvania Class AAA Player of the Year following his senior season.

Considered a four-star recruit by Rivals.com, Dickerson was listed as the No. 5 prospect from Pennsylvania in the class of 2006. He chose Pittsburgh over Iowa, Michigan, and Penn State.

== College career ==
In his initial year at Pittsburgh, Dickerson played in eight games as a true freshman, primarily seeing time at wide receiver and on the kick return unit. As sophomore he was switched over to defense, and played in all 12 games as a reserve strongside linebacker and had 15 total tackles.

His junior year was his first season at tight end, and Dickerson played in 13 games, starting two. He had 13 catches for 174 yards (13.4 avg.) and two touchdowns. In his senior year, Dickerson had 45 receptions for 508 yards (11.3 avg.) and 10 touchdowns. He received All-American honors by the Associated Press, CBS Sports, the Football Writers Association of America, the Sporting News, and the Walter Camp Football Foundation.

== Professional career ==
Pre-draft measurables
Height	Weight	Arm length	Hand span	40-yard dash	10-yard split	20-yard split	20-yard shuttle	Three-cone drill	Vertical jump	Broad jump	Bench press	Wonderlic
6 ft 1 3/8 in (1.86 m)	226 lb (103 kg)	34 in (0.86 m)	9 3/4 in (0.25 m)	4.40 s	1.53 s	2.55 s	4.23 s	6.96 s	43.5 in (1.10 m)	10 ft 5 in (3.18 m)	24 reps	14
All values from NFL Combine/Pro Day

=== Houston Texans ===
Dickerson was selected by the Houston Texans in the seventh round of the 2010 NFL draft with the 227th overall pick. He dressed in 7 games for the Texans in the 2010 season, but did not record any stats. He was released during finals cuts on September 3, 2011.

=== Pittsburgh Steelers ===
On September 12, 2011, he was signed by the Pittsburgh Steelers to their practice squad. He was waived a few days later.

=== New England Patriots ===
On December 7, 2011, the New England Patriots announced that they signed Dickerson to their practice squad. He was placed on practice squad injured reserve on January 25, 2012, shortly after the Patriots won the AFC Championship Game. The Patriots would lose to the New York Giants 21–17 in Super Bowl XLVI.

=== Buffalo Bills ===
On May 14, 2012, he was signed by the Buffalo Bills. He dressed in 11 games for the Bills in the 2012 NFL season, and recorded 9 receptions for 117 yards. He was released on August 30, 2013.

=== Detroit Lions ===
Dickerson signed with the Detroit Lions on October 14, 2013. He was released on October 19, 2013. He was re-signed on November 19, 2013. He made his first catch for the Lions against the Green Bay Packers, for 26 yards. He suffered a concussion in the second half of a game against the New York Giants, but did not report it until dropping a pass in overtime. A few days later on December 26, 2013, Dickerson was placed on injured reserve due to his concussion.

=== Tennessee Titans ===
Dickerson signed with the Tennessee Titans on June 19, 2014. He was placed on injured reserve on August 6, 2014. He signed a futures contract with the Titans on January 5, 2015. On July 30, 2015, Dickerson was once again placed on injured reserve after hurting his Achilles tendon.

== Personal life ==
Following his football career, Dickerson was a weekend and pre-game host for the Pitt Panthers and Pittsburgh Steelers on 93.7 The Fan. He then worked as community outreach manager for the Mascaro Construction Company. It was announced on November 19, 2020, that Dickerson would become the director of project development for the Pittsburgh Penguins on the Lower Hill redevelopment project.

Dickerson's uncle Ron Dickerson was the first ever African-American coach at Temple University and his cousin Ron Dickerson Jr. was a player for the Kansas City Chiefs and current football coach. Dickerson tried out for the WWE in 2018 in honor of his late mother who was a major wrestling fan.
