= Michelle L. Patrick =

American academic administrator

9th President of Robert Morris University
- Incumbent
- Assumed office April 2022; Interim: April 2022 – July 2022
- Preceded by: Mary Ann Rafoth (interim)

Personal details
- Education: Youngstown State University; Kent State University

Michelle L. Patrick is an American academic administrator serving as the ninth president of Robert Morris University since 2022.

== Life ==
Patrick earned a B.S. in marketing and a M.B.A. from Youngstown State University. She completed a Ph.D. in marketing from Kent State University.

Patrick was dean of the college of business and public management at West Chester University. In 2016, she became the dean of the school of business at Robert Morris University (RMU). In April 2022, she became the interim president of RMU, succeeding interim president and provost Mary Ann Rafoth. In July 2022, Patrick was named the ninth president of Robert Morris University. She is the first woman to serve in the role.
