= Moon Area School District =

School district in western Pennsylvania

Moon Area

Address
- 8353 University Boulevard Moon Township, Allegheny County, Pennsylvania, 15108; United States
- Coordinates: 40°29′35″N 80°11′49″W

District information
- Type: Public
- Grades: K–12
- Established: 1932
- Schools: 6
- NCES District ID: 4215830

Students and staff
- District mascot: Tigers
- Colors: Red and White

Other information
- Schedule: High School: 7:30-2:15; Middle School: 7:50-2:40; Elementary: 8:30-3:10
- Website: www.moonarea.net

The Moon Area School District is located about 16 miles northwest of Pittsburgh, Pennsylvania. It serves a portion of the West Hills/Airport Area and comprises Crescent and Moon townships, which include unincorporated villages such as Glenwillard, Wireton, Coraopolis Heights, Thorn Hollow, West Coraopolis, Carnot, Thorn Run Valley, and Mooncrest. Moon Area School District encompasses approximately 31 square miles. The district's administration offices are located inside Moon Area High School, at 8353 University Boulevard, Moon Township, PA 15108.

== Facilities ==
The district currently manages six schools:

- Allard Elementary (grades K-4) - located in western Moon Township, 170 Shafer Road, Moon Township, PA 15108
- Brooks Elementary (grades K-4) - located in Coraopolis Heights, 1720 Hassam Road, Moon Township, PA 15108
- Bon Meade Elementary (grades K-4) - located in Bon Meade, on the Beaver County line, 1595 Brodhead Road, Moon Township, PA 15108
- McCormick Elementary (grades K-4) - located 5 miles south of Moon, 2801 Beaver Grade Road, Moon Township, PA 15108
- Moon Area Middle School (grades 5-8) - located in Moon, 904 Beaver Grade Road, Moon Township, PA 15108
- Moon Area High School (grades 9-12) - located in Moon, 8353 University Boulevard, Moon Township, PA 15108
