= Findlay Township, Pennsylvania =

Township in Pennsylvania, US

- Township
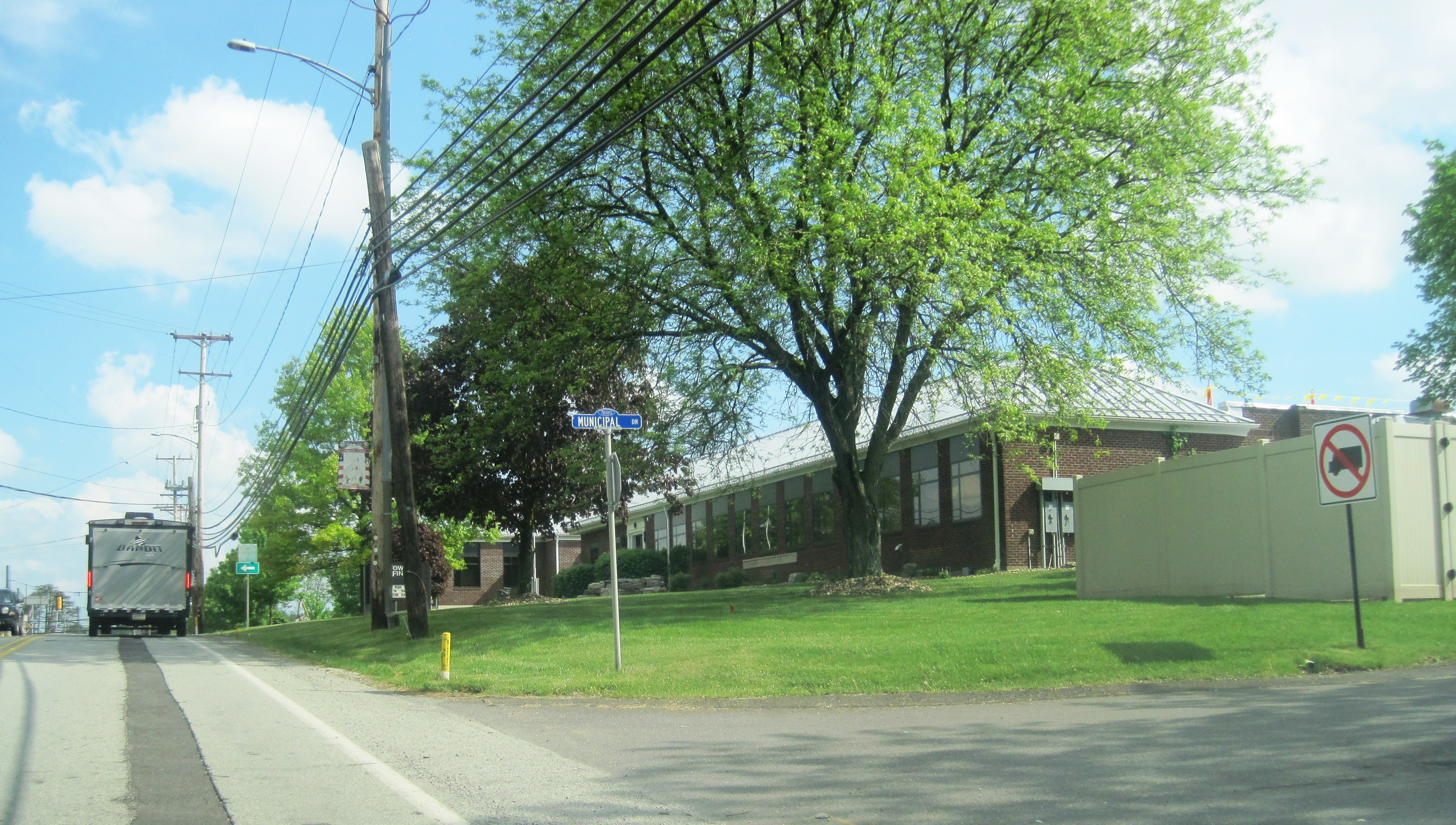
- Findlay Township Municipal Building

- Flag Seal

- Location in Allegheny County and state of Pennsylvania
- Coordinates: 40.47588°N 80.28313°W
- Country: United States
- State: Pennsylvania
- County: Allegheny

Government
  - Type: Second Class Township
  - Body: Board of Supervisors
  - Chair: Janet Craig (R)

Area
  - Total: 32.39 sq mi (83.89 km^{2})
  - Land: 32.38 sq mi (83.87 km^{2})
  - Water: 0.0039 sq mi (0.01 km^{2})
- Elevation: 1,125 ft (343 m)

Population (2020)
  - Total: 6,373 ▲
  - Estimate (2025): 7,541
  - Density: 174.1/sq mi (67.22/km^{2})
- Time zone: UTC-5 (Eastern (EST))
  - Summer (DST): UTC-4 (EDT)
- ZIP Code: 15026, 15071, 15108, 15126
- Area code: 724
- FIPS code: 42-003-25904
- Website: Findlay Township

Findlay Township is a township located in Allegheny County, Pennsylvania, United States. It is a suburb of Pittsburgh and located in the West Hills suburbs. The population was 6,373 at the 2020 census.

The township is the home of Pittsburgh International Airport, which it shares with neighboring Moon Township to the east.

== Geography ==
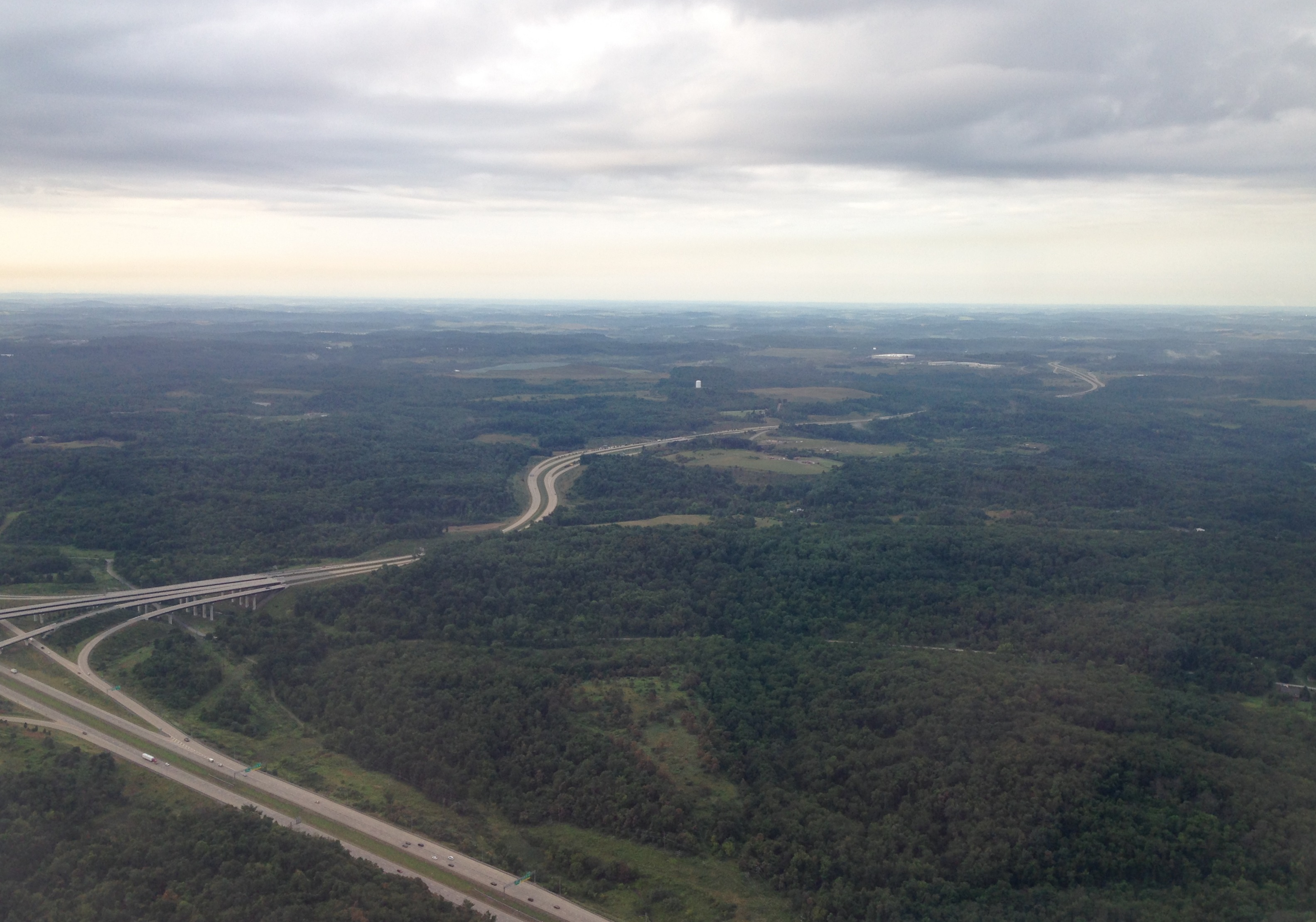
Aerial view of Fidlay Township over PA Route 576

According to the U.S. Census Bureau, the township has a total area of 32.6 square miles (84 km^{2}), all land. It contains part of the census-designated places of Enlow and Imperial.

== Surrounding neighborhoods ==
Findlay Township has four borders, including the townships of Moon to the east and northeast, North Fayette to the southeast, Robinson in Washington County to the southwest, and Independence in Beaver County to the northwest.

== Demographics ==
Historical population
Census	Pop.	Note	%±
1970	4,602		—
1980	4,573		−0.6%
1990	4,500		−1.6%
2000	5,145		14.3%
2010	5,060		−1.7%
2020	6,373		25.9%
2024 (est.)	7,478		17.3%
U.S. Decennial Census

As of the 2000 census, there were 5,145 people, 2,028 households, and 1,460 families residing in the township. The population density was 157.9 inhabitants per square mile (61.0/km^{2}). There were 2,128 housing units at an average density of 65.3 per square mile (25.2/km^{2}). The racial makeup of the township was 96.17% White, 1.63% African American, 0.14% Native American, 1.11% Asian, 0.08% from other races, and 0.87% from two or more races. Hispanic or Latino of any race were 0.56% of the population.

There were 2,028 households, out of which 35.0% had children under the age of 18 living with them, 58.6% were married couples living together, 9.7% had a female householder with no husband present, and 28.0% were non-families. 23.9% of all households were made up of individuals, and 8.2% had someone living alone who was 65 years of age or older. The average household size was 2.53 and the average family size was 3.03.

In the township, the population was spread out, with 25.7% under the age of 18, 5.9% from 18 to 24, 34.0% from 25 to 44, 23.7% from 45 to 64, and 10.7% who were 65 years of age or older. The median age was 37 years. For every 100 females there were 96.4 males. For every 100 females age 18 and over, there were 91.6 males.

The median income for a household in the township was $47,484, and the median income for a family was $55,930. Males had a median income of $40,173 versus $27,045 for females. The per capita income for the township was $21,417. About 4.8% of families and 5.2% of the population were below the poverty line, including 6.4% of those under age 18 and 10.9% of those age 65 or over.

== Government ==
Presidential election results
Year	Republican	Democratic	Third parties
2020	57% 2,183	41% 1,583	1% 47
2016	61% 1,723	38% 1,079	1% 95
2012	59% 1,413	40% 963	1% 29

== Economy ==
Dick's Sporting Goods is headquartered in Findlay Township.

Since mid-2014, the Pittsburgh Post-Gazette has had a large printing operation in the Clinton area of the township.

Prior to its dissolution, MidAtlantic Airways had its headquarters on the grounds of Pittsburgh International Airport in Findlay.

Since 1979, the RIDC has developed business and research park property adjacent to the airport.

== Education ==
West Allegheny School District serves the township. The Wilson School serves elementary school students. West Allegheny Middle School and West Allegheny High School serve secondary students.

Western Allegheny Community Library serves Findlay Township, North Fayette, and Oakdale.

== Transportation ==
A portion of Pittsburgh International Airport is in Findlay Township.
