= MidAtlantic Airways =

IATA	ICAO	Call sign
BK	PDC	USAIR
- Founded: 2002; 24 years ago
- Ceased operations: May 27, 2006; 20 years ago
- Operating bases: Pittsburgh International Airport
- Fleet size: See Fleet below
- Destinations: See Destinations below
- Parent company: US Airways
- Headquarters: Findlay Township, Pennsylvania, U.S.

MidAtlantic Airways was a regional airline based at Pittsburgh International Airport in Findlay Township, Pennsylvania, United States. It was a subsidiary of US Airways and operated the Embraer 170 medium-jet aircraft as a US Airways Express carrier. It ceased operations on May 27, 2006.

== History ==
The airline was reformed from the remnants of short-lived Potomac Air, which was created in late 2000 and started flying 37-seat de Havilland Canada Dash 8-200 aircraft in early 2001, based at Ronald Reagan Washington National Airport in Arlington County, Virginia near Washington D.C. Potomac ceased operations during the closure of Reagan National after the September 11 terrorist attacks; US Airways then reformed Potomac as MidAtlantic in the spring of 2002. MidAtlantic officially launched on Sunday, April 4, 2004, with service from Pittsburgh.

Some CRJ flying was done by MidAtlantic as early as 2002 but those airplanes eventually went to the US Airways Group subsidiary PSA Airlines.

On February 9, 2006, US Airways announced a firm order for 25 Embraer 190 aircraft, a cousin of the 170. However, unlike the smaller E-Jet, the 190 has an 11-seat First Class cabin and is operated by mainline employees under the US Airways banner. On May 28, 2006, MidAtlantic stopped operating.

== Destinations ==
As of January 2006, MidAtlantic Airways was operating services to the following domestic scheduled destinations: Albany, Atlanta, Baltimore, Boston, Burlington, Charleston, Chicago, Cleveland, Dallas/Fort Worth, Detroit, Fort Lauderdale, Hartford, Houston, Jacksonville, Kansas City, Key West, Manchester, Milwaukee, Nashville, New York City, Orlando, Philadelphia, Pittsburgh, Portland, Providence, Raleigh/Durham, Rochester, St. Louis, and Washington, D.C.

== Fleet ==
As of January 2005, the MidAtlantic Airways fleet consisted of:

- 25 Embraer 170
- 6 Bombardier CRJ700
- On order: 60 Embraer 170

== See also ==
- List of defunct airlines of the United States
