= C. J. Davis =

American football player (born 1987)

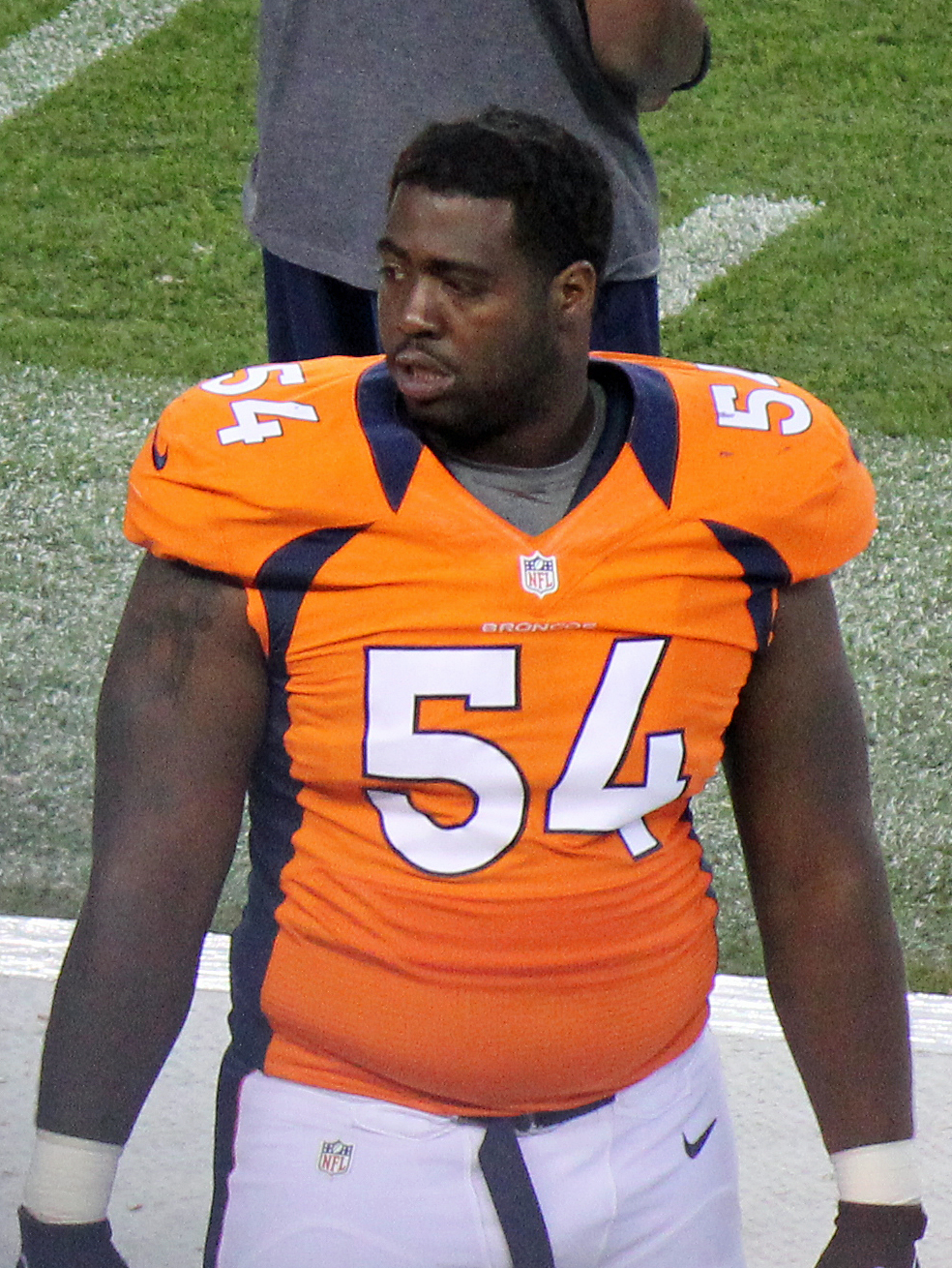
- Davis in 2012

No. 70
- Position: Guard

Personal information
- Born: February 2, 1987 (age 39); Imperial, Pennsylvania, U.S.
- Listed height: 6 ft 3 in (1.91 m)
- Listed weight: 310 lb (141 kg)

Career information
- College: Pittsburgh
- NFL draft: 2009: undrafted

Career history
- Carolina Panthers (2009−2011); Denver Broncos (2012–2013); Seattle Seahawks (2014–2015)*
- * Offseason or practice squad member only

Career NFL statistics
- Games played: 14
- Stats at Pro Football Reference

Emmanuel "C.J." F. Davis, Jr. (born February 2, 1987) is an American former professional football player who was a guard in the National Football League (NFL). He was signed by the Carolina Panthers as an undrafted free agent in 2009. He played college football for the Pittsburgh Panthers. He is the cousin of former NFL tight end Lovett Purnell.

== Professional career ==
=== Carolina Panthers ===
After going undrafted in the 2009 NFL draft, Davis signed with the Carolina Panthers as an undrafted free agent on April 26, 2009. He missed the entire 2009 season due to an ankle injury.

He was released on September 12, 2011, with an injury settlement.

=== Denver Broncos ===
Davis signed with the Denver Broncos on February 15, 2012.

=== Seattle Seahawks ===
On July 24, 2014, Davis signed with the Seattle Seahawks. The Seahawks placed Davis on injured reserve on August 26, 2014.

Davis was released on May 5, 2015.
