= Enlow, Pennsylvania =

Unincorporated community in Pennsylvania, US

- Census-designated place
- Location in Allegheny County and state of Pennsylvania
- Coordinates: 40°27′7″N 80°13′56″W
- Country: United States
- State: Pennsylvania
- County: Allegheny
- Townships: Findlay, North Fayette

Area
  - Total: 0.72 sq mi (1.86 km^{2})
  - Land: 0.72 sq mi (1.86 km^{2})
  - Water: 0 sq mi (0.00 km^{2})

Population (2020)
  - Total: 1,138
  - Density: 1,583.6/sq mi (611.44/km^{2})
- Time zone: UTC-5 (Eastern (EST))
  - Summer (DST): UTC-4 (EDT)
- FIPS code: 42-23720

Enlow is a census-designated place (CDP) in Allegheny County, Pennsylvania, United States. The community was formerly part of the Imperial-Enlow CDP, which was split into two separate CDPs as of the 2010 census. The population was 1,138 at the 2020 census.

The CDP is located in North Fayette and Findlay townships.

== History ==
Enlow Station was a stop on the Montour Railroad at the current location of Enlow. The station was named for Amos Enlow, a farmer in the area.

== Geography ==
Enlow is located at 40°27′7″N 80°13′56″W (40.4520, -80.2323).

According to the United States Census Bureau, the CDP had a total area of 0.7 square miles (1.8 km^{2}), all land.

== Demographics ==
Historical population
Census	Pop.	Note	%±
2010	1,013		—
2020	1,138		12.3%
U.S. Decennial Census
