= Austin Hendrick =

American baseball player

Free agent
- Outfielder
- Born: June 15, 2001 (age 25); Pittsburgh, Pennsylvania, U.S.
- Bats: Left Throws: Left
Medals
Men's baseball
Representing United States
18U Baseball World Cup
Silver medal – second place	2019 Gijang	Team

Austin Daniel Hendrick (born June 15, 2001) is an American professional baseball outfielder who is a free agent. Hendrick was selected 12th overall by the Reds in the 2020 Major League Baseball draft.

== Amateur career ==
Hendrick grew up in Pittsburgh, Pennsylvania and attended West Allegheny Senior High School, where he was both an outfielder and a starting pitcher on the baseball team. Regarded as one of the best collegiate recruits in his class early on, he committed to play college baseball at Mississippi State after his freshman year of high school when he batted .371 with three home runs, 20 RBIs and 17 walks and went 5-0 with 37 strikeouts in 34 innings as a pitcher. He batted .327 with a .519 on-base percentage and 12 RBIs, two doubles, two triples and two home runs with 23 walks in 79 plate appearances in his junior season. After the season, Hendrick played for the United States national baseball team in the 2019 World Baseball Softball Confederation U-18 Baseball World Cup in Gijang, South Korea. He also played in the Under Armour All-America Game and won the event's home run derby as well as the MLB High School Home Run Derby.

== Professional career ==
Hendrick was considered one of the top high school prospects for the 2020 Major League Baseball draft, and was selected 12th overall by the Cincinnati Reds. Hendrick signed with the Reds for a $4 million bonus. After not playing a minor league game in 2020 due to the cancellation of the season, Hendrick was added to Cincinnati's 60-man player pool with whom would train at Prasco Park.

Hendrick made his professional debut in 2021 with the Daytona Tortugas, slashing .211/.380/.388 with seven home runs, 29 RBI and 16 doubles over 63 games. He struck out 100 times and walked 51 times over 209 at-bats. He missed time during the season due to groin and wrist injuries. In 2022, he played with Daytona and the Dayton Dragons and batted .216 with 21 home runs and 69 RBI over 109 games. Hendrick returned to play with Dayton in 2023 and appeared in 125 games in which he hit .204 with 14 home runs and 47 RBI. In 2024, Hendrick played with the Chattanooga Lookouts, batting .188 with 11 home runs and 30 RBI across 121 games. He returned to Chattanooga for the 2025 season and hit .246 with 14 home runs and 52 RBI over 93 games. Hendrick split the 2026 season between Chattanooga and the Louisville Bats and batted .212 with 17 home runs and 63 RBI over 116 games. He elected free agency on November 2.
