= Moon Township, Pennsylvania =

Township in Pennsylvania, US

- Township
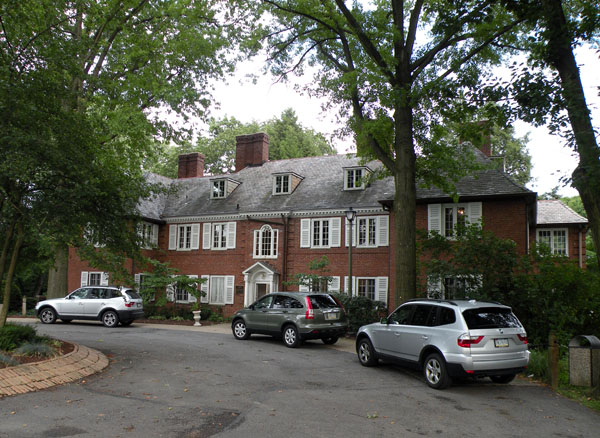
- Robin Hill House in Moon Township

- Flag Seal

- Location of Moon Township in Allegheny County and Pennsylvania
- Coordinates: 40°31′N 80°14′W
- Country: United States
- State: Pennsylvania
- County: Allegheny
- Incorporated: 1788

Government
  - Type: Council
  - Chairman: David Bachman (R)

Area
  - Total: 24.12 sq mi (62.46 km^{2})
  - Land: 23.83 sq mi (61.71 km^{2})
  - Water: 0.29 sq mi (0.75 km^{2})
- Elevation: 1,175 ft (358 m)

Population (2020)
  - Total: 27,261 ▲
  - Estimate (2022): 26,782
  - Density: 1,073.6/sq mi (414.52/km^{2})
- Time zone: UTC−5 (Eastern (EST))
  - Summer (DST): UTC−4 (EDT)
- ZIP Code: 15108
- Area codes: 412, 724
- FIPS code: 42-003-50784
- Website: Moon Township

Moon Township is a township in Allegheny County, Pennsylvania, United States, along the Ohio River. The population was 27,261 at the 2020 census. Located 12 miles (19 km) northwest of Pittsburgh, the township is part of the Pittsburgh metropolitan area and is home to Pittsburgh International Airport and Robert Morris University.

== History ==
=== 18th century ===
The initial settlement of Moon Township was a direct result of the westward expansion of English settlers and traders who arrived in the Ohio Valley in the early to mid-18th century. During the French and Indian War, the Iroquois, who controlled the land for hunting grounds through right of conquest, ceded large parcels of southwestern Pennsylvania lands through treaty or abandonment to settlers. In some cases, the land was already occupied by squatters who were to be forced off the land. In the face of this turmoil, Native American settlements of the south bank of the Ohio River typically relocated to more populous areas of the north bank in the current locales of Sewickley and Ambridge.

On the southern banks of the Ohio River, political disputes among settlers clouded the disposition of lands. Generally, the Pennsylvania Land Office apportioned land to owners through grants. However, some of the land encompassing what is now the Coraopolis Heights, Thorn Run valley, and Narrows Run valley were claimed through the process of "Tomahawk Improvements", a non-specific and oftentimes contested method. Settlement processes were often convoluted because of differences among land policies of the several colonies claiming the land, specifically Pennsylvania and Virginia.

On April 3, 1769, Andrew Montour, an Indian interpreter who had provided service to the English settlers during the French and Indian War, was granted one of the first land patents for approximately 350 acres (1.4 km^{2}) of what later became the borough of Coraopolis and Neville Island. In 1773, the settler John Meek was awarded a 400-acre (1.6 km^{2}) land grant from Virginia above the river bottom and between the Thorn Run and Montour Run valleys, and "Moon Township" was born, although formal, legal recognition would have to wait until 1788.

The settlers Robert Loudon and John Vail were awarded grants to a total of 600 acres (2.4 km^{2}). Loudon's tract was situated on the Coraopolis Heights adjacent to the Meek grant. Vail's grant was established between the current Thorn Run and Narrows Run valleys (although the exact location is open to some interpretation). Three other early grants were warranted by either Virginia or Pennsylvania land speculators. The boundaries of these land tracts are hard to identify, and the names of the original grantees are contested. But historians believe that they encompassed about 700 acres (2.8 km^{2}) or so, and were occupied by anonymous squatters. Given that the history is somewhat hazy, it remains that in abandoning their lands, the unidentified squatters ceded any potential claims to settlers who would otherwise improve and/or cultivate the land.

As the 18th century drew to a close, abandoned lands were taken up by new settlers who were drawn to the region by the fertility of the soil. This round of pioneers were, by and large, wealthier than their predecessors and had the means to develop the broken and hilly areas into plots suitable for farming.

Moon Township was created in 1788 as one of the original townships of the newly created Allegheny County. In 1789 by an act of the legislature a portion of Washington County south of the Ohio River was transferred to Allegheny County. The transferred area became part of Moon Township.

At this time Moon Township occupied an enormous tract of land, possibly 145 square miles (380 km^{2}). Some reports and, more often, legends of the time indicate that it would take one man on horseback two days to travel between the boundaries of the township. The sheer difficulty of settlers performing their civic duties (e.g., reporting to assigned polling places or attending jury trials) made it necessary for local governing authorities to parcel out the land into smaller municipalities. So, in 1790, the current Fayette Township was portioned off from Moon Township, to be followed by Findlay and Crescent townships, respectively.

=== 19th century ===
In 1800, when Beaver County was created from Allegheny and Washington Counties that portion of Beaver County south of the Ohio River that it received from Allegheny County was in Moon Township. Upon the creation of Beaver County that portion of Moon Township that Allegheny County lost to Beaver County was divided into two new townships: First Moon and Second Moon Townships, Beaver County.

=== 20th century ===
In 1943, the federal government designed and built a housing plan known as Mooncrest for defense workers. Mooncrest residents produced armor plates, munitions and ships at the nearby Dravo Corp. during World War II. Operated by the U.S. Air Force after 1945, homes were sold to private investors in the mid-1950s.

Moon became home to Pittsburgh International Airport in 1951, replacing the Allegheny County Airport as the main terminal for the region. The area developed mainly due to the airport. Prior to this time, the western hills of Allegheny County consisted largely of rolling farms and small residential developments. On April 1, 1956, TWA Flight 400 crashed on takeoff from the airport, killing 22 people just past the east end of the runway, which lies in Moon Township. Development of Pennsylvania Route 60 (now Interstate 376) to the Pittsburgh airport, plus the addition of the Parkway West from Pittsburgh and nearby exits of Interstate 79, allowed Moon to become the area's crossroads for transportation via air and road.

During the Cold War, Moon Township was the location of Nike Site PI-71, which was a battery of Nike Ajax and/or Nike Hercules surface-to-air missiles, used by US armed forces for high – and medium-altitude air defense. The former missile site is now a nature preserve.

In 1991, the relocation of the landside terminal of the Pittsburgh International Airport to nearby Findlay Township resulted in a loss in traffic to the township. Moon experienced a significant loss of tax revenues but has since rebounded as the cargo area for the airport. A large part of the airport's runways and facilities are located within the boundary of Moon Township, although the terminal and about half of the airport's land area are in Findlay Township, to the west.

Since the loss of the airport terminal, the township has shifted its focus from airport commerce to corporate development, residences and university hub. The main campus of Robert Morris University is also located within the township.

Playing off the township's unique name, supervisors in 2005 gave Moon a new slogan, "Explore Our Universe". "The slogan is a play not only on the township's lunar name but also on Robert Morris University and the University Boulevard business corridor, which township officials would like investors and consumers to explore a little more thoroughly," wrote the Pittsburgh Post-Gazette in 2005.

== Geography ==
According to the U.S. Census Bureau, the township has a total area of 24.1 square miles (62 km^{2}), of which 23.7 square miles (61 km^{2}) is land and 0.3 square miles (0.78 km^{2}), or 1.41%, is water. It contains the census-designated place of Carnot-Moon.

Climate data for Moon Township, PA (1991–2020 normals)
Month	Jan	Feb	Mar	Apr	May	Jun	Jul	Aug	Sep	Oct	Nov	Dec	Year
Mean daily maximum °F (°C)	35.6 (2.0)	39.4 (4.1)	48.5 (9.2)	62.0 (16.7)	71.8 (22.1)	79.0 (26.1)	83.0 (28.3)	82.3 (27.9)	75.6 (24.2)	63.3 (17.4)	50.8 (10.4)	40.4 (4.7)	61.0 (16.1)
Daily mean °F (°C)	27.5 (−2.5)	30.4 (−0.9)	38.1 (3.4)	49.8 (9.9)	60.5 (15.8)	68.6 (20.3)	72.6 (22.6)	71.3 (21.8)	64.4 (18.0)	52.2 (11.2)	41.8 (5.4)	33.1 (0.6)	50.9 (10.5)
Mean daily minimum °F (°C)	19.4 (−7.0)	21.3 (−5.9)	27.8 (−2.3)	37.6 (3.1)	49.2 (9.6)	58.3 (14.6)	62.2 (16.8)	60.2 (15.7)	53.2 (11.8)	41.2 (5.1)	32.7 (0.4)	25.8 (−3.4)	40.7 (4.8)
Average precipitation inches (mm)	3.06 (78)	2.59 (66)	3.35 (85)	3.56 (90)	3.96 (101)	4.37 (111)	4.11 (104)	3.56 (90)	3.81 (97)	3.07 (78)	3.11 (79)	3.25 (83)	41.80 (1,062)
Source: NOAA

=== Surrounding and adjacent communities ===
Moon Township has six land borders, including Crescent Township to the north-northwest, Hopewell Township (Beaver County) to the northwest, Findlay Township to the west and southwest, North Fayette Township to the south, Robinson Township to the southeast, east and northeast, and the borough of Coraopolis to the north-northeast. Across the Ohio River to the northwest, a section of Moon runs adjacent with (from north to south) Edgeworth, Sewickley, and Glen Osborne. The Sewickley Bridge is the direct link between Moon Township and Sewickley.

== Demographics ==
Historical population
Census	Pop.	Note	%±
1850	1,383		—
1860	1,148		−17.0%
1870	1,230		7.1%
1880	1,389		12.9%
1890	1,449		4.3%
1900	1,371		−5.4%
1910	1,526		11.3%
1920	1,700		11.4%
1930	2,900		70.6%
1940	3,733		28.7%
1950	7,096		90.1%
1960	10,642		50.0%
1970	18,317		72.1%
1980	20,935		14.3%
1990	19,631		−6.2%
2000	22,290		13.5%
2010	24,185		8.5%
2020	27,261		12.7%
2022 (est.)	26,782		−1.8%
U.S. Decennial Census

As of the 2000 census, there were 22,290 people, 8,445 households, and 5,767 families residing in the township. The population density was 939.1 inhabitants per square mile (362.6/km^{2}). There were 9,200 housing units at an average density of 387.6 per square mile (149.7/km^{2}). The racial makeup of the township was 93.17% White, 3.58% African American, 0.06% Native American, 1.94% Asian, 0.02% Pacific Islander, 0.25% from other races, and 0.97% from two or more races. Hispanic or Latino people of any race were 0.99% of the population.

There were 8,445 households, out of which 31.2% had children under the age of 18 living with them, 58.9% were married couples living together, 7.1% had a female householder with no husband present, and 31.7% were non-families. Of all households, 26.8% were made up of individuals, and 6.7% had someone living alone who was 65 years of age or older. The average household size was 2.44 and the average family size was 2.99.

In the township, the population was spread out, with 22.1% under the age of 18, 10.6% from 18 to 24, 29.9% from 25 to 44, 24.6% from 45 to 64, and 12.8% who were 65 years of age or older. The median age was 38 years. For every 100 females, there were 97.3 males. For every 100 females age 18 and over, there were 95.1 males.

The median income for a household in the township was $57,173, and the median income for a family was $68,256. Males had a median income of $48,444 versus $31,073 for females. The per capita income for the township was $26,457. About 2.2% of families and 4.2% of the population were below the poverty line, including 3.6% of those under age 18 and 3.5% of those age 65 or over.

== Economy ==
Moon Township is home to Pittsburgh International Airport, the primary international airport serving Greater Pittsburgh, with Findlay Township. The township is home to the Air Force Reserve Command 911th Airlift Wing, which was established in 1943. Moon is also home to the 171st Air Refueling Wing of the Pennsylvania Air National Guard. Additionally, the Army has its 99th Regional Readiness Command, built in the late 1990s.

Major corporation headquarters in Moon include Nova Chemicals, FedEx Ground, Dick's Sporting Goods, and First Health/Coventry. Moon Township is the location of the National Weather Service forecast office that serves Pittsburgh.

Ground was broken in late 2006 on the new Cherrington Parkway extension. The extension, which opened in early 2008, created additional shovel-ready land for Class A office space, for corporate development.

As a result of Robert Morris University, the college feeds much of the economy along the township's University Boulevard area.

US Airways was based at Pittsburgh International Airport and had its flight operations center in Moon until was closed following the 2015 merger of US Airways and American Airlines.

=== Retail ===
The West Hills Shopping Center, once the heart of Moon's commercial business, was sold to Walmart for $4.7 million and announced to the public on January 3, 2007. Walmart officials announced their plans to build a supercenter location on the site of what was the West Hills Shopping Center. The store opened in fall of 2016.

On the morning of August 14, 2003, the former Beers School and Narrows Run Roads (from the I-376 Business Loop route to Thorn Run Road) became known as University Boulevard, a move that helped to promote the township as the home of Robert Morris University. The new road name also depicts the township's efforts to re-emerge as a business-dominant community. Since the 2003 renaming, township officials have researched various zoning ordinances to piece together Moon's main business corridor.

== Government and politics ==
Presidential elections results
Year	Republican	Democratic	Third parties
2020	51% 7,658	47% 7,098	1% 187
2016	55% 6,875	44% 5,554	1% 94
2012	57% 6,785	42% 4,908	1% 121

The township is policed by the Moon Township Police Department.

Pittsburgh IAP Air Reserve Station is in the township.

== Education ==
Moon Township is home to the Moon Area School District, which consists of students from both Moon and Crescent townships. The school district enrolls approximately 3,900 students in its seven schools educating grades kindergarten through 12th grade.

Robert Morris University enrolls nearly 5,000 students and offers 60 bachelor's degree programs and 35 master's and doctoral programs at its campus in Moon.

== Transportation ==
A part of Pittsburgh International Airport is in the township.

== Livability ==
In 2007, Moon Township was honored with several honors as one of the country's best places to live. BusinessWeek.com ranked Moon one of five best affordable suburbs in the Northeast. The recognition includes the 15108 zip code covering Coraopolis borough, Kennedy and Moon townships.

Moon was nominated as a runner-up in the list of top Pittsburgh suburbs to raise a family in 2013.

== Notable people ==
- Kurt Angle, NCAA champion wrestler, US Olympic gold-medal wrestler, World Wrestling Entertainment (WWE) and Total Nonstop Action Wrestling (TNA) professional wrestler; also formerly a sports anchor at WPGH-TV
- Jodi Applegate, graduate of Moon Area High School, former NBC News anchor, currently employed at the Fox affiliate in New York City
- Jim Baechtold, second pick in 1952 NBA draft and Head Coach of Eastern Kentucky University basketball
- Barry Bonds, resided in Moon while playing for the Pittsburgh Pirates
- Plaxico Burress, resided in Moon while playing for the Pittsburgh Steelers
- John Calipari, graduate of Moon Area High School, basketball coach
- Lou Christie, graduate of Moon Area High School in 1961; singer, songwriter
- Willie Colon, Pittsburgh Steelers
- Bob Davie, former Notre Dame football coach and current ESPN sportscaster, grew up in Moon
- Ann B. Davis, actress, briefly lived in Moon in the 1990s
- Joe DeNardo, long-time WTAE-TV personality that was mostly known for his work as a meteorologist and the phrase "Joe Said It Would"
- Trai Essex, Pittsburgh Steelers
- Sean Gilbert, Washington Redskins player
- James Harrison, Pittsburgh Steelers
- Cameron Johnson, professional basketball player
- Ryan Malone, former Pittsburgh Penguin
- Sarah Marince, singer
- Rich Milot, graduate of Moon Area High School; former linebacker with the Washington Redskins from 1979 to 1987 in the National Football League; played college football at Penn State University
- T. Mark Mustio, Pennsylvania state representative
- John Pippy, former Pennsylvania state senator
- Katelyn Pippy, actress
- Ray Seals, resided in Moon while playing for the Pittsburgh Steelers
- A. Q. Shipley, center for the Arizona Cardinals, graduate of Moon Area High School
- Brandon Wilson, graduate of Moon Area High School, author/explorer
- Khama Worthy, former UFC fighter

== Moon in the media ==
- Scenes from the 1979 movie The Fish that Saved Pittsburgh were shot in the gym at Moon Area High School.
- Parts of the movie The Silence of the Lambs were filmed in Moon Township. Several Moon Township police officers had minor non-speaking roles as extras in the film.
- Parts of the movie Adventureland were filmed in Moon Township at the Stardust Lounge.
- The movie Monkey Shines was largely filmed there.

=== Presidential visits ===
Because Pittsburgh International Airport is adjacent to Moon, many presidential visits to the Pittsburgh area start in Moon. For example, President Gerald Ford made a surprise visit to Moon a day after pardoning President Richard M. Nixon on September 9, 1974. In 1994, President Bill Clinton greeted Prime Minister John Major of Great Britain at a hangar at the 911th Air Wing of the Air Force Reserve at the Pittsburgh International Airport in Moon Township. A day after securing the Democratic nomination for president, then–Vice President Al Gore held a rally at Moon's high school gym on March 16, 2000. In September 2009, President Obama visited Pittsburgh for the G-20 conference. Then–Republican presidential nominee Donald Trump held a rally on June 11, 2016, at the Moon Township airplane hangar. On March 10, 2018, then-President Trump held another rally at the Moon Township airplane hangar, campaigning in support of Republican congressional candidate Rick Saccone for a special election within Pennsylvania's 18th congressional district. On Wednesday, April 17, 2024, Joe Biden, along with Pittsburgh Mayor Ed Gainey and Allegheny County Executive Sara Innamorato, visited a Sheetz gas station on University Boulevard to pick up sandwiches for construction workers.
