= Moon Area High School =

Public secondary school in Moon Township, Pennsylvania, United States

Location
- 8353 University Boulevard; Moon Township, PA 15108; United States; 40.512941°N 80.217790°W

Information
- Funding type: Public
- School district: Moon Area School District
- Principal: Ryan Matsook
- Teaching staff: 89.65 (FTE)
- Enrollment: 1,247 (2023-2024)
- Student to teacher ratio: 13.91
- Colors: Red, white, and black
- Mascot: Tiger
- Website: Moon Area High School

Moon Area High School is a public high school located in Moon Township, Pennsylvania, United States. Part of the Moon Area School District, the school serves students from grades 9 - 12.

== Statewide PSSA rankings ==
High school PSSA standardized tests are administered statewide to public high schools. Moon's rankings are as follows:

- 2017 - 45th of 659
- 2016 - 17th
- 2015 - 23rd
- 2014 - 20th
- 2013 - 17th

== Athletics ==
Moon High student athletes are able to compete in 14 sports. In most instances, Moon High sports compete in the Western Pennsylvania Interscholastic Athletic League (WPIAL), District VII of the Pennsylvania Interscholastic Athletic Association (PIAA).

=== Football ===
The Moon High football team competes in the WPIAL Class AAAAA Allegheny Six Conference, which is made up of South Fayette, Baldwin, Upper St. Clair, Bethel Park, and Peters Township.

=== Girls' soccer ===
The Moon High girls' soccer team won the PIAA AA state title in 2012.

The Moon High girls' soccer team won the PIAA AAA state title in 2016, 2017, 2022 and 2023.

The Moon High girls' soccer team won the PIAA AAAA state title in 2021.

=== Girls' rugby ===
The Moon High girls' rugby team won the RugbyPA D2 state title in 2017.

The Moon High girls' rugby team won the RugbyPA D1 state title in 2022.

=== Swimming and diving ===
The Moon boys' swimming team won the state championship in 1980, and the girls' team won state titles in 1996 and 1997.

=== Boys' basketball ===
The Moon High boys' basketball team won the state championship in 2004.

In the 2006–2007 season, Moon entered the WPIAL Class AAAA, but went back down to WPIAL Class AAA in the 2008–2009 season.

Moon boys' varsity basketball won the PIAA 5A final March 22, 2019.

== Notable alumni ==
- Jodi Applegate, class of 1982, Emmy Award-winning host of Fox 5's Good Day New York; previously co-anchor of NBC's Weekend Today and Later Today
- John Calipari, class of 1978, head coach for the University of Arkansas men's basketball team
- Lou Christie, class of 1961, singer/songwriter with popular hits like "Lightnin' Strikes" and "Rhapsody in the Rain"
- Bob Davie, class of 1972, football head coach for the University of New Mexico; former head coach at Notre Dame and television sports commentator
- Rich Milot, class of 1975, former linebacker for Penn State 1975–1979 and NFL's Washington Redskins 1979–1987; played in three Super Bowls, winning twice
- A. Q. Shipley, class of 2004, former Super Bowl-winning center for the NFL's Tampa Bay Buccaneers
- Brandon Wilson, class of 1971, explorer and Lowell Thomas Award-winning author and photographer
