= Oakdale, Pennsylvania =

Borough in Pennsylvania, US

- Borough
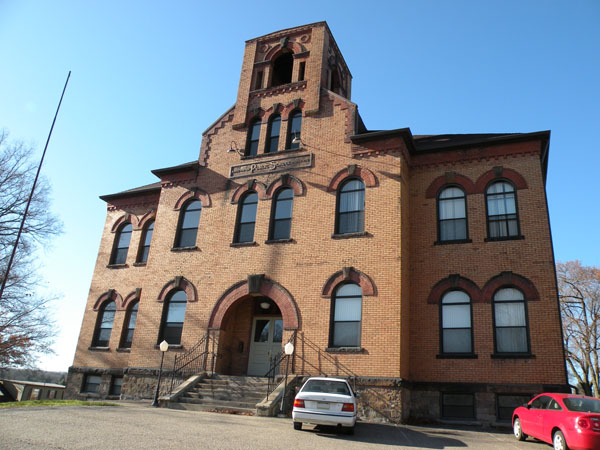
- Former Oakdale Public School, built in 1905

- Location in Allegheny County and the state of Pennsylvania.
- Coordinates: 40°23′58″N 80°11′8″W
- Country: United States
- State: Pennsylvania
- County: Allegheny

Government
  - Mayor: Steve Trusnovic

Area
  - Total: 0.47 sq mi (1.22 km^{2})
  - Land: 0.47 sq mi (1.22 km^{2})
  - Water: 0 sq mi (0.00 km^{2})

Population (2020)
  - Total: 1,475
  - Density: 3,141.9/sq mi (1,213.11/km^{2})
- Time zone: UTC-5 (Eastern (EST))
  - Summer (DST): UTC-4 (EDT)
- FIPS code: 42-55840
- Website: www.oakdaleborough.com

Oakdale is a landlocked borough in Allegheny County, Pennsylvania, United States. The population was 1,475 at the 2020 census. It is a suburb of Pittsburgh.

== History ==
Oakdale Borough was incorporated in 1892. On May 18, 1918, a TNT explosion in a local chemical factory killed 200 people. On September 17, 2004, Oakdale was devastated by a flood resulting from the rain brought by the remnants of category 5 Hurricane Ivan. The downpour from Ivan followed a steady rain that had covered the Allegheny County area from category 4 Hurricane Frances, which struck the area just 10 days before Ivan hit. The flooding caused a large-scale evacuation of the community, and brought Red Cross volunteers and National Guard members to the area in an effort to control the confusion. The flooding destroyed businesses, many of which never reopened, and displaced many residents whose homes were condemned.

== Geography ==
According to the United States Census Bureau, the borough has a total area of 0.5 square miles (1.3 km^{2}), all land.

Robinson Run, a tributary to Chartiers Creek, flows through the southeastern part of the borough. Oakdale is bordered by North Fayette Township to the north and South Fayette Township to the south.

== Demographics ==
Historical population
Census	Pop.	Note	%±
1880	507		—
1900	1,147		—
1910	1,353		18.0%
1920	1,611		19.1%
1930	1,703		5.7%
1940	1,766		3.7%
1950	1,572		−11.0%
1960	1,695		7.8%
1970	2,136		26.0%
1980	1,955		−8.5%
1990	1,752		−10.4%
2000	1,551		−11.5%
2010	1,459		−5.9%
2020	1,475		1.1%

As of the 2000 census, there were 1,551 people, 604 households, and 445 families residing in the borough. The population density was 2,956.0 inhabitants per square mile (1,141.3/km^{2}). There were 640 housing units at an average density of 1,219.8 per square mile (471.0/km^{2}). The racial makeup of the borough was 98.19% White, 0.90% African American, 0.06% Native American, 0.06% Asian, 0.39% from other races, and 0.39% from two or more races. Hispanic or Latino of any race were 0.71% of the population.

There were 604 households, out of which 28.6% had children under the age of 18 living with them, 62.1% were married couples living together, 8.8% had a female householder with no husband present, and 26.2% were non-families. 22.7% of all households were made up of individuals, and 9.6% had someone living alone who was 65 years of age or older. The average household size was 2.57 and the average family size was 3.04.

In the borough the population was spread out, with 22.8% under the age of 18, 6.8% from 18 to 24, 27.7% from 25 to 44, 30.6% from 45 to 64, and 12.1% who were 65 years of age or older. The median age was 41 years. For every 100 females, there were 93.2 males. For every 100 females age 18 and over, there were 94.3 males.

The median income for a household in the borough was $46,574, and the median income for a family was $55,865. Males had a median income of $37,125 versus $26,620 for females. The per capita income for the borough was $21,392. About 2.9% of families and 2.6% of the population were below the poverty line, including 2.9% of those under age 18 and 1.1% of those age 65 or over.

== Government and politics ==
=== Local leaders ===
- Mayor: Steve Trusnovic
- Borough Council President: Mark Maximovich
- Borough Council Vice President: Jonathan DeBor
- Council Members:
  William Hartman Jr.
  Al Pifer
  Barbara Rossen

=== Political affiliation ===
Oakdale is predominantly supportive of the Republican Party. The town generally supported incumbent Republican president Donald Trump over Democratic challenger Joe Biden in the 2020 presidential election, though supported Biden at a slightly higher margin than for 2016 Democratic candidate Hillary Clinton.

Presidential election results
Year	Republican	Democratic	Third parties
2020	54% 488	44% 396	1% 11
2016	55% 415	44% 327	1% 9
2012	48% 350	51% 371	1% 8

== Education ==
Oakdale is served by the West Allegheny School District.

Western Allegheny Community Library serves Findlay Township, North Fayette, and Oakdale.

Oakdale was home to Pittsburgh Technical College, (formerly Pittsburgh Technical Institute) as well as the West Hills branch of Community College of Allegheny County.

== Transportation ==
Oakdale's main road is Pennsylvania Route 978, locally known as Clinton Ave. The road bisects the town while running in a generally northwest-southeast pattern. Oakdale is located approximately equidistant from Pennsylvania Route 576 and U.S. Route 22-30. (Note: Throughout much of western Allegheny County, U.S. routes 22 and 30 run concurrently.) Pittsburgh's Panhandle Trail also runs through central Oakdale.

Rail transport today into and through Oakdale is nonexistent, as the last freight railway has been converted into the Panhandle Trail. Public transport is also nonexistent within the town, aside from bus service to Pittsburgh Technical College.

Oakdale is located very close to Pittsburgh International Airport and is within a 20-minute drive.

== Notable person ==
- Margaret McFarland, child psychologist and consultant to Mister Rogers' Neighborhood
- Steve B. Howell, NASA astrophysicist and winner of the 2026 Catherine Wolfe Bruce award for recognition of a lifetime of outstanding achievement and contributions to astrophysics research. https://astrosociety.org/who-we-are/awards/catherine-wolfe-bruce-gold-medal.html/
