= Imperial, Pennsylvania =

Unincorporated community in Pennsylvania, US

- Census-designated place
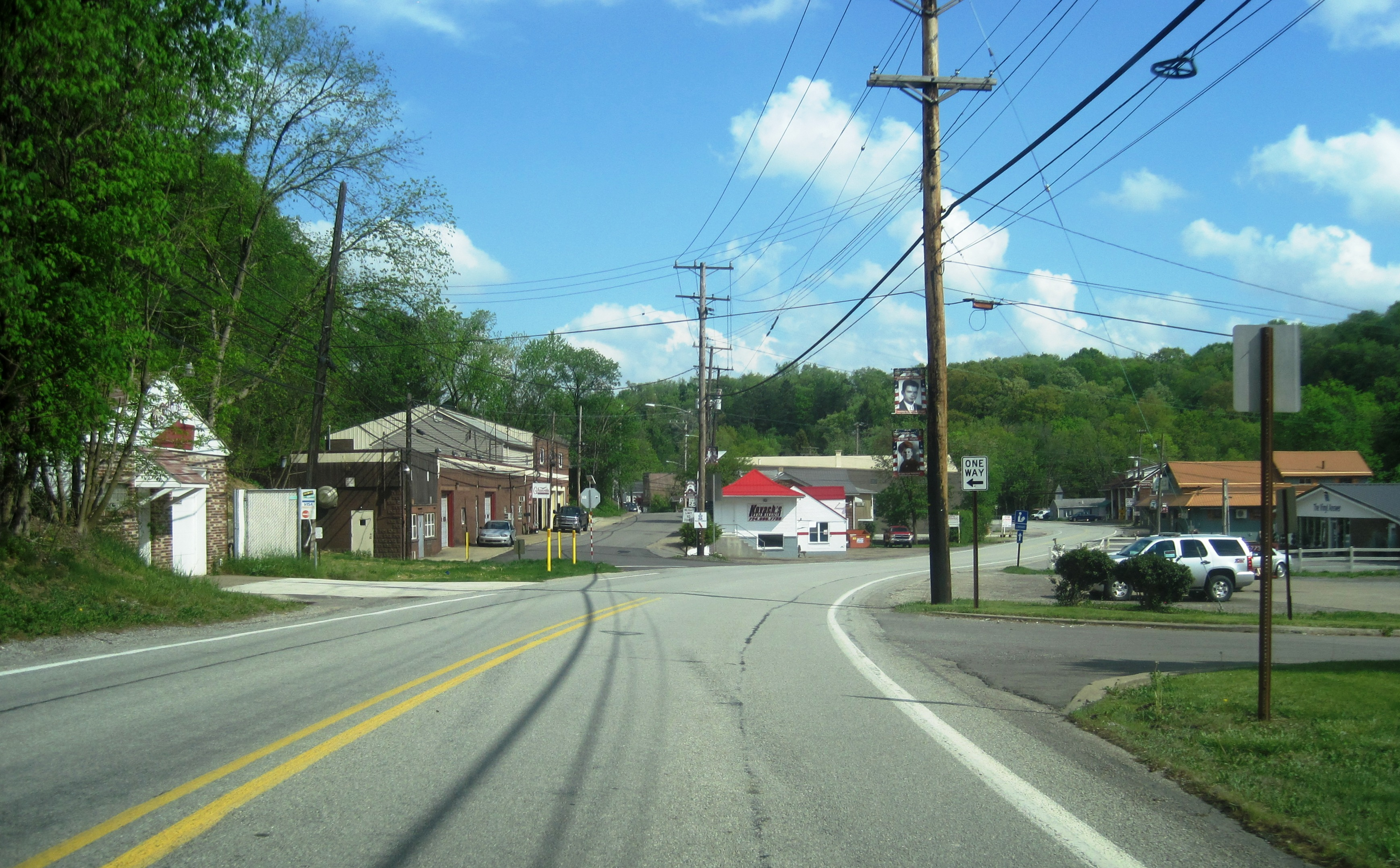
- US 30 eastbound in Imperial

- Location in Allegheny County and state of Pennsylvania
- Coordinates: 40°27′13″N 80°14′59″W
- Country: United States
- State: Pennsylvania
- County: Allegheny
- Townships: Findlay, North Fayette

Area
  - Total: 3.17 sq mi (8.22 km^{2})
  - Land: 3.17 sq mi (8.22 km^{2})
  - Water: 0 sq mi (0.00 km^{2})

Population (2020)
  - Total: 2,722
  - Density: 858.0/sq mi (331.27/km^{2})
- Time zone: UTC-5 (Eastern (EST))
  - Summer (DST): UTC-4 (EDT)
- ZIP code: 15126
- Area code: 724
- FIPS code: 42-36768

Imperial is a census-designated place (CDP) in Allegheny County, Pennsylvania, United States and part of the Pittsburgh metropolitan area. The population was 2,722 at the 2020 census. The CDP is located in North Fayette and Findlay Townships, and geographically close to Pittsburgh International Airport.

== History ==
Imperial was established as a mining town circa 1879 by the Imperial Coal Company. It sits along Montour Run on land that had been the farm of Robert Wilson. Known at first as Montour City, the town soon took the name of the coal company, with a post office under the name Imperial opening in 1880. The town and nearby mines were served by the Montour Railroad. The community was formerly part of the Imperial-Enlow CDP before splitting into two separate CDPs. In 2020, Amazon opened a large fulfillment center complex in Imperial off of Pennsylvania Route 576.

== Geography ==
Imperial is located at 40°27′13″N 80°14′59″W (40.4536 N, 80.2498 W). According to the U.S. Census Bureau, the CDP has a total area of 3.1 square miles (8.0 km^{2}), all land.

In terms of road access to Imperial, U.S. Route 30 passes through the middle of the township, with U.S. Route 22 and Interstate 376 providing expressway access to roads in Imperial. Additionally, the partially completed Pennsylvania Route 576 has an exit serving Imperial.

== Demographics ==
Historical population
Census	Pop.	Note	%±
2010	2,541		—
2020	2,722		7.1%
U.S. Decennial Census

As of the 2010 U.S. census, the population was 2,541, of whom 94 had been born outside of the United States, and 173 were veterans. A total of 85.9% of the population had a high school education or higher. The median age was 40.9 years. The median household income was $56,439. 6.3% of the population were below the poverty level.

== Education ==
Children in Imperial are served by the West Allegheny School District. The current schools serving the community are:

- Wilson Elementary School – grades K-5
- West Allegheny Middle School – grades 6-8
- West Allegheny Senior High School – grades 9-12
