= North Fayette Township, Pennsylvania =

Township in Pennsylvania, US

Township of North Fayette
- Township
- North Fayette Township
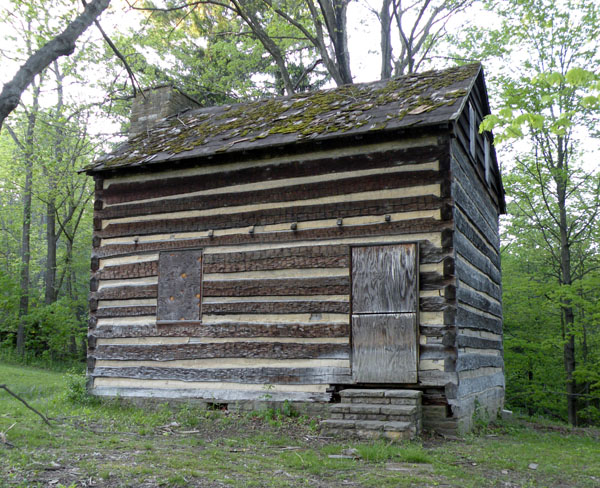
- Walker-Ewing-Glass Log House in Settler's Cabin Park

- Flag Seal

- Location in Allegheny County and state of Pennsylvania
- Coordinates: 40°25′52″N 80°12′51″W
- Country: United States
- State: Pennsylvania
- County: Allegheny
- Named for: Gilbert du Motier, Marquis de Lafayette

Government
  - Type: Second Class Township
  - Body: Board of Supervisors
  - Chair: Robert Doddato (R)

Area
  - Total: 25.19 sq mi (65.23 km^{2})
  - Land: 25.19 sq mi (65.23 km^{2})
  - Water: 0 sq mi (0.00 km^{2})

Population (2020)
  - Total: 16,166 ▼
  - Estimate (2025): 16,017
  - Density: 577.9/sq mi (223.13/km^{2})
- Time zone: UTC-5 (Eastern (EST))
  - Summer (DST): UTC-4 (EDT)
- Area code: 724
- FIPS code: 42-003-55016
- Website: Township of North Fayette

The Township of North Fayette is a township in Allegheny County, Pennsylvania, United States. The township is a suburb of Pittsburgh. The population was 16,166 at the 2020 census.

== Geography ==
According to the United States Census Bureau, the township has a total area of 27 square miles (65.0 km^{2}), all land. It contains parts of the census-designated place of Enlow, Imperial, Noblestown, and Sturgeon.

== Surrounding neighborhoods ==
North Fayette Township has eight borders, including Findlay Township to the northwest, Robinson Township to the northeast, Moon Township to the north, Collier Township to the east, Oakdale and South Fayette Township to the southeast, McDonald to the south, and Robinson Township in Washington County from the southwest to the west.

== Economy ==
The Pointe at North Fayette is located within the township and includes several retail plazas, big box stores, hotels, and office buildings. The Pointe at North Fayette sits adjacent to major shopping destinations Robinson Town Centre, The Mall at Robinson, and Settlers Ridge. U.S. Route 22, U.S. Route 30, and Interstate 376 (Parkway West) run through North Fayette Township.

Pittsburgh Technical College and the Community College of Allegheny County are also located within the township on McKee Road. The township has been home to the Park Lane Office center since 1989.

== Education ==
The Township is served by the West Allegheny School District. According to SchoolDigger.com West Allegheny School District ranks as the 46th best school district in the state of Pennsylvania out of 610.

Western Allegheny Community Library serves Findlay Township, North Fayette, and Oakdale.

== Demographics ==
Historical population
| Census | Pop. | Note | %± |
|---|---|---|---|
| 1970 | 5,626 | | — |
| 1980 | 7,351 | | 30.7% |
| 1990 | 9,537 | | 29.7% |
| 2000 | 12,254 | | 28.5% |
| 2010 | 13,934 | | 13.7% |
| 2022 (est.) | 16,118 |
U.S. Decennial Census

At the 2000 census, there were 12,254 people, 5,004 households, and 3,347 families in the township. The population density was 488.6 inhabitants per square mile (188.6/km^{2}). There were 5,293 housing units at an average density of 211.0 per square mile (81.5/km^{2}). The racial makeup of the township was 93.99% White, 2.60% African American, 0.12% Native American, 2.51% Asian, 0.01% Pacific Islander, 0.16% from other races, and 0.60% from two or more races. Hispanic or Latino of any race were 0.88%.

There were 5,004 households, 33.3% had children under the age of 18 living with them, 54.6% were married couples living together, 9.2% had a female householder with no husband present, and 33.1% were non-families. 27.0% of households were made up of individuals, and 5.7% were one person aged 65 or older. The average household size was 2.43 and the average family size was 3.00.

In the township the population was spread out, with 24.7% under the age of 18, 6.2% from 18 to 24, 39.3% from 25 to 44, 20.7% from 45 to 64, and 9.0% 65 or older. The median age was 36 years. For every 100 females there were 96.6 males. For every 100 females age 18 and over, there were 94.3 males.

The median household income was $51,482 and the median family income was $58,804. Males had a median income of $44,233 versus $32,418 for females. The per capita income for the township was $26,139. About 4.5% of families and 6.4% of the population were below the poverty line, including 6.9% of those under age 18 and 9.5% of those age 65 or over.

== Government and politics ==
Presidential election results
| Year | Republican | Democratic | Third parties |
|---|---|---|---|
| 2020 | 54% 4,721 | 44% 3,839 | 1% 96 |
| 2016 | 59% 3,888 | 40% 2,634 | 1% 44 |
| 2012 | 57% 3,393 | 43% 2,559 | 0% 51 |

== Presidential and Vice Presidential visits ==
On April 16, 2014, President Barack Obama and Vice President Joe Biden spoke at Community College of Allegheny County's West Hills Center to praise CCAC's job-training programs as a national model, promoting the need to match education to the demands of the economy.

On January 19, 2018, President Donald Trump, along with daughter Ivanka and many other political representatives, visited H&K Equipment in North Fayette Township.
