= Pennsylvania Route 576 =

Toll highway in Pennsylvania

Pennsylvania Route 576
- Southern Beltway
- Open segment highlighted in red, proposed segment highlighted in blue

Route information
- Maintained by PTC
- Length: 19.2 mi (30.9 km)
- Existed: October 11, 2006–present

Major junctions
- West end: I-376 in Findlay Township
- US 30 in Findlay Township; US 22 in Robinson Township
- East end: I-79 / Morganza Road in Cecil Township

Location
- Country: United States
- State: Pennsylvania
- Counties: Allegheny, Washington

Highway system
- Pennsylvania State Route System; Interstate; US; State; Scenic; Legislative
← PA 572	→ I-579

Pennsylvania Route 576 (PA Turnpike 576), also known as the Southern Beltway, is a controlled-access toll road in the southern and western suburbs of Pittsburgh, Pennsylvania, United States. It is envisioned to serve as a southern beltway around the Greater Pittsburgh area between Pittsburgh International Airport and the historic Steel Valley of the Monongahela River.

The first segment of the highway between PA 60 (now I-376) and Pittsburgh International Airport in Findlay Township and US 22 in Robinson Township opened to traffic on October 11, 2006. The second segment of the highway between US 22 and I-79 in Cecil Township near the National Cemetery of the Alleghenies opened to traffic on October 15, 2021. The status of the final segment of the highway between I-79 and PA Turnpike 43 (the Mon–Fayette Expressway) is still pending, with federal approval already given.

Like the Mon–Fayette Expressway, the Southern Beltway has no direct connection to the Pennsylvania Turnpike mainline despite being built and maintained by the Pennsylvania Turnpike Commission (PTC). Both highways, however, will have indirect connections with the turnpike's mainline via I-376.

== Route description ==
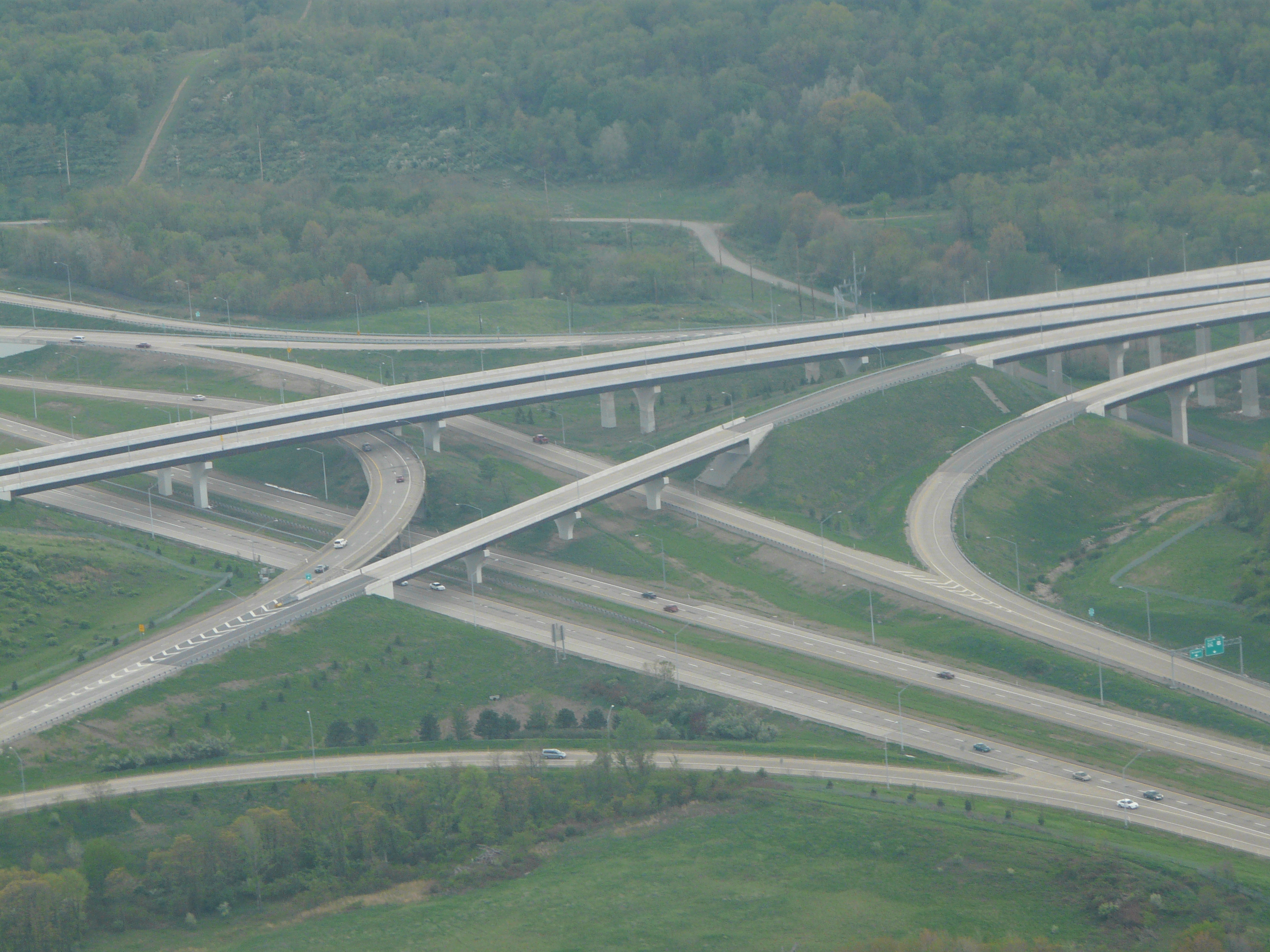
Northern terminus of PA Turnpike 576. Top right: PA Turnpike 576; top left to bottom right: I-376. Pittsburgh International Airport is to the bottom left of this photo

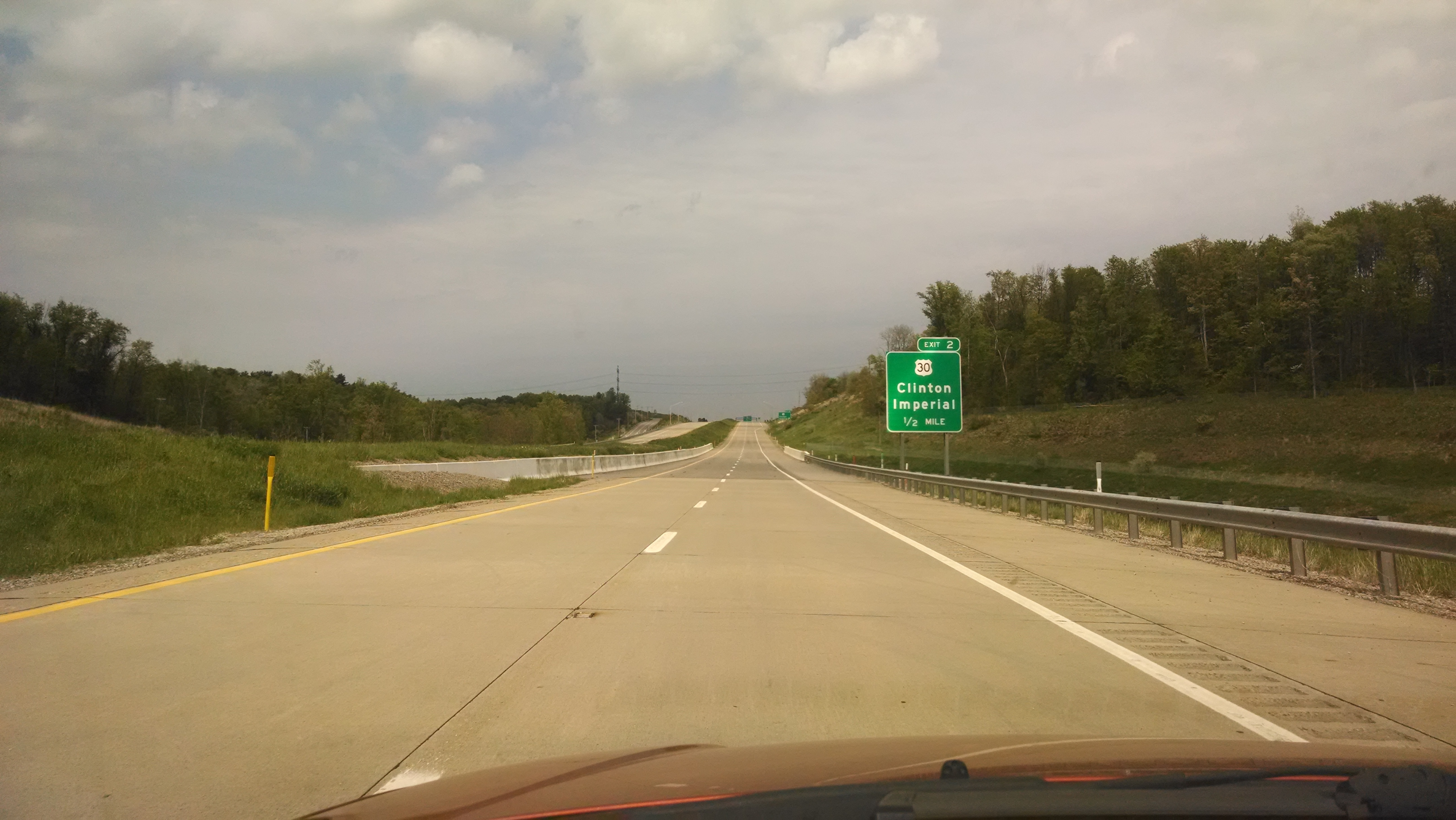
PA Turnpike 576 heading westbound near the interchange with US 30 in Findlay Township

PA Turnpike 576 begins at an interchange with I-376 and the entrance to Pittsburgh International Airport in Findlay Township, Allegheny County. From here, the route heads southwest as a four-lane freeway. The road runs through wooded areas, where it curves south and has a diamond interchange with US 30. Past this interchange, PA Turnpike 576 continues southwest through more rural areas, coming to a mainline toll gantry before it reaches the Westport Road interchange. Following this, the freeway crosses into Robinson Township in Washington County and heads south to reach a three-level diamond interchange with the US 22 freeway.

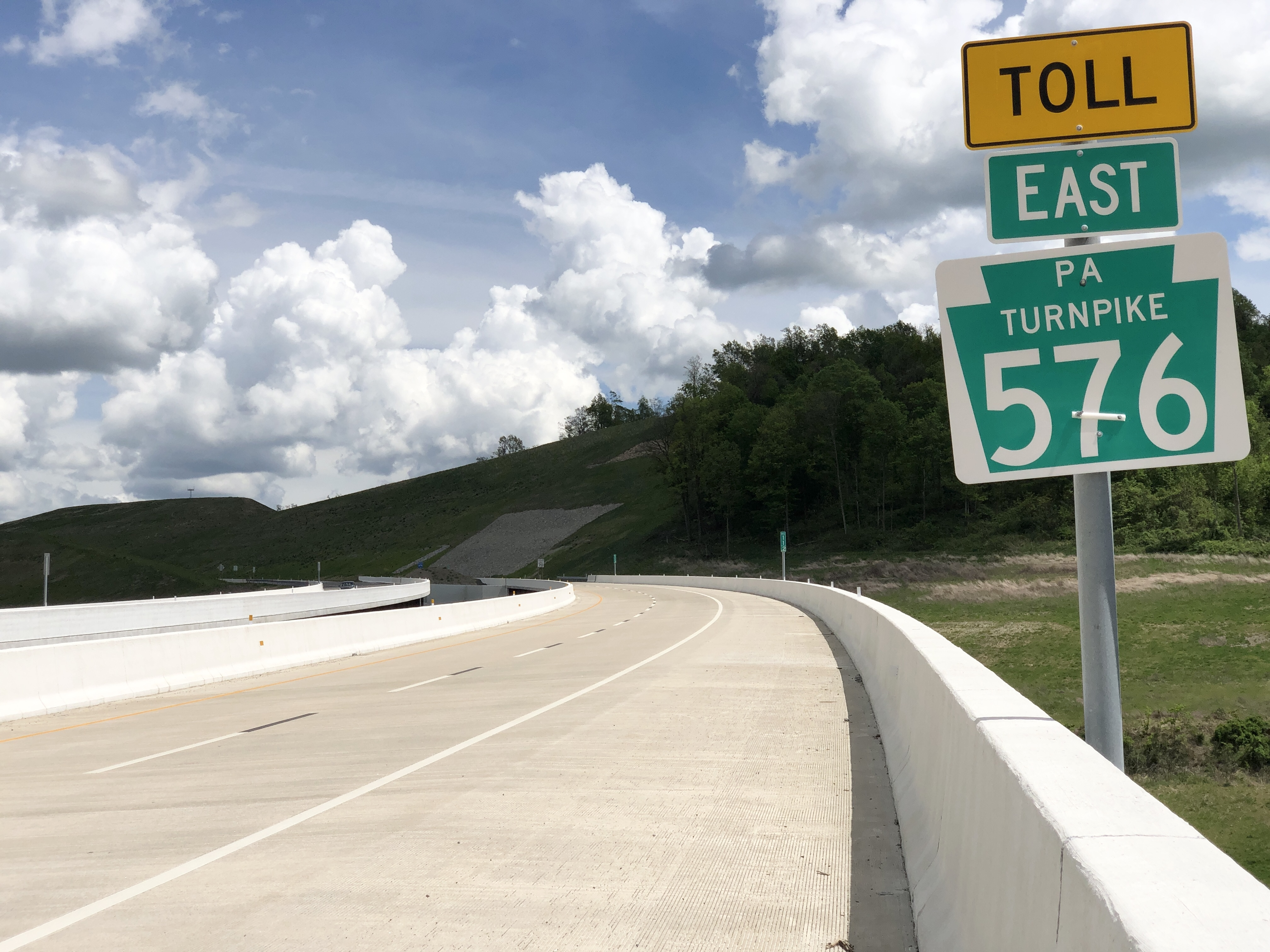
PA Turnpike 576 eastbound past the Fort Cherry Road interchange in Robinson Township

Past the US 22 interchange, PA Turnpike 576 continues south through wooded areas with some fields and development, coming to a mainline toll gantry before curving to the southeast. The road reaches a diamond interchange with Beech Hollow Road that provides access to PA 980. The freeway continues southeast through fields and comes to a diamond interchange with Fort Cherry Road that connects to PA 980 between the borough of Midway to the west and the borough of McDonald to the east. Past this interchange, PA Turnpike 576 curves east as it passes over Robinson Run, the Panhandle Trail, and the Montour Trail on a high bridge into Mount Pleasant Township, soon crossing into Cecil Township. The road heads over PA 980 on a high bridge south of McDonald as it continues through rural areas. The freeway crosses into South Fayette Township in Allegheny County and immediately turns southeast, running immediately to the northeast of the border with Washington County and reaching a mainline toll gantry. PA Turnpike 576 crosses back into Cecil Township in Washington County as it continues near the county line. The freeway re-enters South Fayette Township in Allegheny County and heads further from the county line, coming to a diamond interchange with South Fayette Way that provides access to PA 50. Past this interchange, the road comes to a high bridge that crosses over a Wheeling and Lake Erie Railway line, Millers Run, and PA 50. PA Turnpike 576 continues southeast through a mix of fields and woodlands and heads across Coal Run before it crosses back into Cecil Township in Washington County and comes to its present eastern terminus at an interchange with I-79 and Morganza Road.

== Tolls ==
PA Turnpike 576 uses all-electronic tolling, with tolls payable by toll-by-plate (which uses automatic license plate recognition to take a photo of the vehicle's license plate and mail a bill to the vehicle owner) or E-ZPass. Mainline toll gantries are located between exits 2 and 4, exits 6 and 8, and exits 11 and 16. As of 2024, the toll to travel the entire length of PA Turnpike 576 costs $9.00 using toll-by-plate and $4.50 using E-ZPass, with each mainline toll gantry charging $3.00 using toll-by-plate and $1.50 using E-ZPass.

The Findlay Connector section of PA Turnpike 576 originally had ramp toll plazas located at the eastbound exit and westbound entrances of its three interchanges (excluding the western terminus at I-376). All toll plazas were equipped with an electronic fare collection system (E-ZPass) and for cash customers, a dual-height, automated machine for toll collection.

On June 3, 2018, the turnpike commission implemented all-electronic tolling along the Findlay Connector section of PA Turnpike 576. The ramp tolls were removed and all-electronic tolls were collected from a toll gantry along the mainline.

== History ==
=== Early development ===
While many metropolitan areas in the U.S. comparable to the size of Pittsburgh such as Baltimore, Cincinnati, Columbus, Indianapolis, Louisville, and Nashville have an Interstate beltway that serve both locals and long-distance travelers as a way to ease traffic congestion, the Pittsburgh metropolitan area does not have a true beltway. With the exception of the rainbow-colored Pittsburgh Belt System, most major traffic roadways either travel into the city (such as I-279 and I-376) or bypass it just outside the city limits (moving north/south I-79 and the mainline Pennsylvania Turnpike/I-76), with I-70 to the south and I-80 to the north being a somewhat greater distance from the city. While it could be argued that Pittsburgh does have somewhat of an existing beltway with I-79 from Cranberry Township to Washington, I-70 from Washington to New Stanton, and the Turnpike from New Stanton to Cranberry, the distance of I-70 from the city in comparison to the other two highways make it a little farther out from the typical beltway. Additionally, I-70 in between Washington and New Stanton, as well as the Turnpike, are not up to modern Interstate Highway standards. Although Pittsburgh does have the pre-Interstate Allegheny County belt system, these are mostly on surface streets and are rarely promoted by the city and Allegheny County.

The Southern Beltway, which would bring a southern road closer to the city core and serve as a partial beltway, was first conceived in the 1980s when the Mon–Fayette Expressway received new life with Act 61 legislation, which transferred control of that project from PennDOT to the PTC. Additionally, the relocation and expansion of Pittsburgh International Airport helped spur the project. Less than a year before the airport relocated to its new site, the PTC decided to move forward with the Southern Beltway project in 1991.

=== PA 60 to US 22 ===
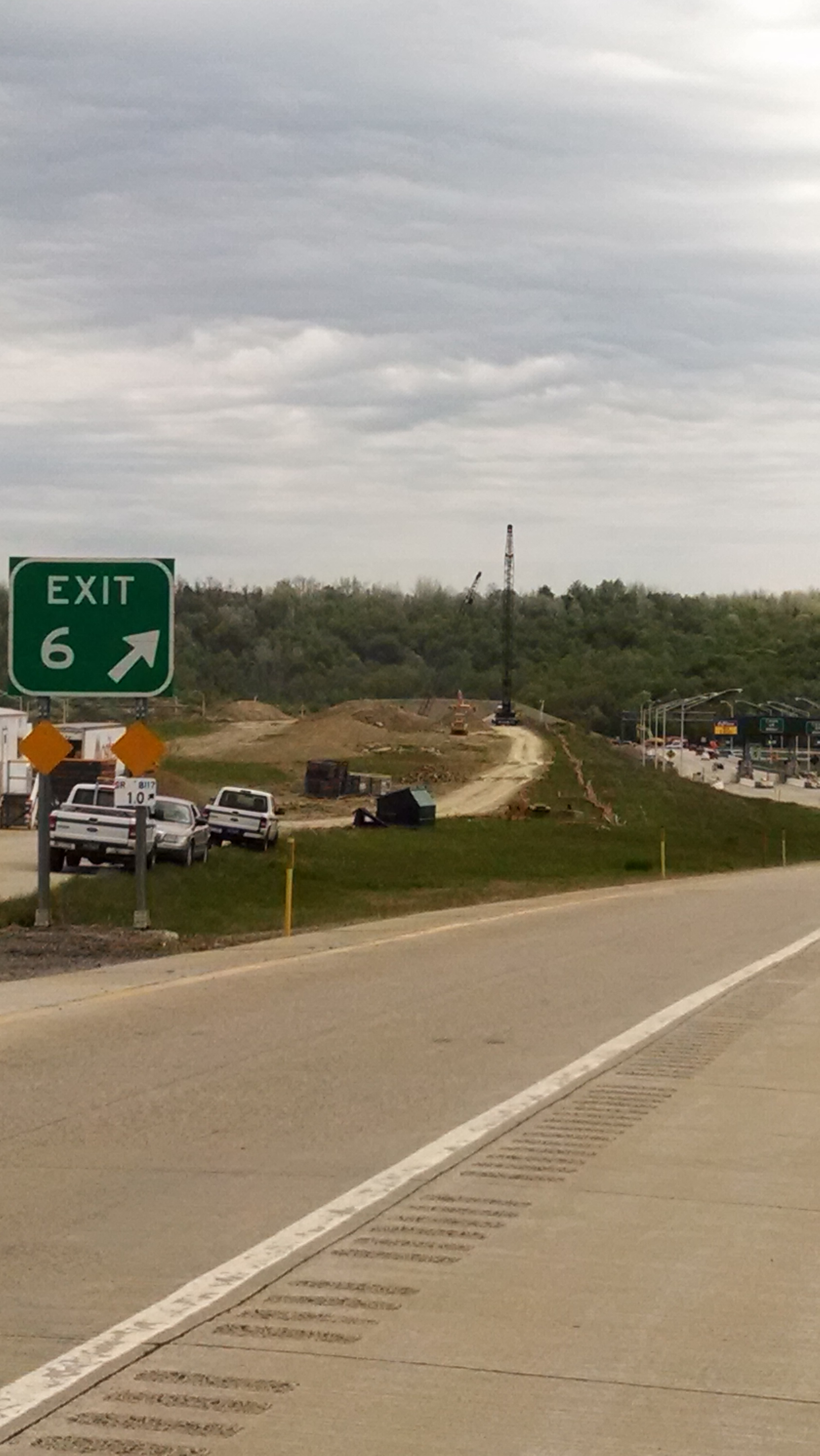
The then-eastern terminus of PA Turnpike 576 at US 22 in Robinson Township in 2014, with the bridge over US 22 under construction

Ground on the first leg of the Southern Beltway, also known as the Findlay Connector, was broken on November 12, 2003, connecting what was then PA 60 to US 22. The Connector was delayed by the discovery of state endangered short eared owls nesting at the Imperial Grasslands in the path of construction. The Findlay Connector received its name because it served as a connector from the Weirton, West Virginia/Steubenville, Ohio area to the Pittsburgh International Airport through Findlay Township. The connector reduced the average commute time between these places by at least 15 minutes. The Findlay Connector opened on October 11, 2006. Before construction of the Findlay Connector, residents from the Weirton/Steubenville area had to travel down US 22 all the way down to PA 60 in heavily congested Robinson Township, then take then-PA 60 north to the Airport. In 2009, PA 60 north of the interchange was rebranded as an extension of I-376. Due to funding limitations, as well as emphasis on connecting the two fragmented sections of the Mon–Fayette Expressway between Uniontown and Brownsville, the Findlay Connector would be the only section of the Southern Beltway to be built for a decade.

=== US 22 to I-79 ===
On December 21, 2012, the PTC announced that construction of a 13.2 mile section between US 22 and I-79 would proceed. The initially projected completion date was for some time in 2021. Weather conditions and other delays pushed the probable completion date closer to the summer of 2022.

The toll route between US 22 and I-79 features all-electronic tolling as the Findlay Connector now does. On November 25, 2013, Pennsylvania Governor Tom Corbett signed a transportation bill into law, known as Act 89, that would raise vehicle registration fees and remove the oil tax cap in order to fund transportation projects in the state. Act 89 was expected to provide funding to complete the Southern Beltway all the way to the Mon–Fayette Expressway and to provide almost half of the $2.2 billion (as of December 2013) cost needed to complete the Mon–Fayette Expressway.

The second leg of the Southern Beltway is the first project completed with the new funding available for both the Southern Beltway and the Mon–Fayette Expressway. On January 13, 2014, the PTC awarded two contracts for the project, anticipating completion in 2019, a year ahead of the original schedule. Increased activity in the Marcellus Formation, which was just beginning when the Findlay Connector opened in 2006, helped expedite the earlier opening date for the second section of the Southern Beltway.

Construction began on February 17, 2014, with rock blasting on the unbuilt end of the US 22 interchange to begin building the bridge to carry the Southern Beltway over US 22, while a formal groundbreaking with Governor Corbett and other state officials occurred on May 12, 2014. Construction beyond the interchange began in January 2017 and would involve excavating underneath I-79 to allow the Southern Beltway to pass underneath that highway. Work began on the 3.2-mile section of the highway between the Panhandle Trail and Cecil Reissing Road in Cecil in March 2017, a $90.6 million project. By April 2021, most of the mainline paving and bridge work was complete, with finishing touches like road sign and toll gantry installation as well as line striping to take place in mid-2021. Completion of ramps to connect eastbound PA Turnpike 576 to southbound I-79 and northbound I-79 to westbound PA Turnpike 576 was planned to take place in mid-October 2021, with the remaining movements at the I-79 interchange to be completed by early 2022. On October 9, 2021, a community day was held on a section of the roadway, with visitors allowed to walk or bicycle along the highway. A ribbon-cutting ceremony for this segment was held on October 14, 2021, with state and local officials in attendance, which opened to traffic the following day. Construction of the remaining movements at the I-79 interchange was completed and opened to traffic on June 24, 2022.

The second leg of the Southern Beltway is expected to provide significant economic development to rural northwestern Washington County. As part of the road project, Robinson Township changed many of its zoning laws to promote development along the Southern Beltway corridor, including allowing hydraulic fracturing in some zones. Additionally, since the project was announced, Royal Dutch Shell has built a $6 billion cracker plant in nearby Monaca in Beaver County. This itself has created a major economic boom in the area, with hotels and a mini-casino being built in the vicinity.

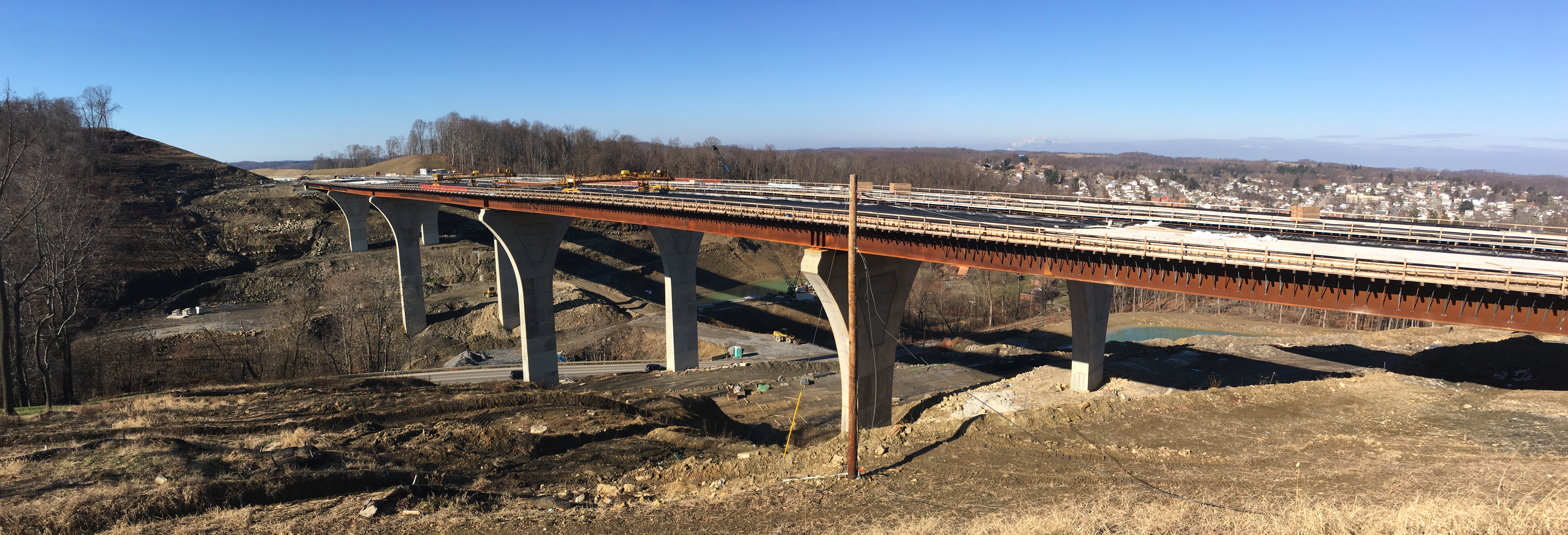
Bridges under construction over PA 980 in McDonald in 2018

== Future ==
=== I-79 to PA Turnpike 43 ===
In December 2014, it was reported that the Mon–Fayette Expressway and the Southern Beltway might get additional funding through foreign investors who obtain an EB-5 visa in exchange for investing at least $500,000 for public projects. The Pennsylvania Turnpike Commission will use EB-5 funding for the Pennsylvania Turnpike/Interstate 95 Interchange Project first before determining if it will use such funding for other projects. The PTC was expected to make a decision on how to proceed on the Southern Beltway's final leg by mid-2015. On June 18, 2015, the PTC announced that the final leg of the Southern Beltway would be restarted and return to the design phase, though no timetable for its construction has been established.

Due to ongoing financial issues with the PTC regarding Act 44, the future of the Mon–Fayette Expressway and the Southern Beltway was in doubt due to the PTC wanting to focus its capital expenses on its ongoing project of widening the mainline Pennsylvania Turnpike to six lanes except at its tunnels. On November 16, 2016, the PTC announced that they would not suspend any capital projects for the time being, but did place the Mon–Fayette Expressway and Southern Beltway projects on a list to be suspended if “future financial or economic conditions dictate a construction spending reduction”. The Mon–Fayette Expressway and Southern Beltway projects made the list despite the fact that the two projects are funded independently of toll revenue. The announcement is not expected to affect the second leg of the Southern Beltway.

== Exit list ==
County	Location	mi	km	Exit	Destinations	Notes
Allegheny	Findlay Township	0.0	0.0	1	I-376 – Beaver, Airport, Pittsburgh	Western terminus; signed as exits 1A (west) and 1B (east); exit 53 on I-376; access to Airport via Airport Boulevard
Allegheny	Findlay Township	1.4	2.3	2	US 30 – Clinton, Imperial	
Allegheny	Findlay Township	2.6	4.2	Toll Gantry		
Allegheny	Findlay Township	3.7	6.0	4	Westport Road	
Washington	Robinson Township	5.6	9.0	6	US 22 – Pittsburgh, Weirton	
Washington	Robinson Township	6.3	10.1	Toll Gantry		
Washington	Robinson Township	7.7	12.4	8	Beech Hollow Road to PA 980	
Washington	Robinson Township	10.7	17.2	11	To PA 980 – McDonald, Midway	Access via Fort Cherry Road
Allegheny	South Fayette Township	13.7	22.0	Toll Gantry		
Allegheny	South Fayette Township	15.4	24.8	16	South Fayette Way to PA 50	
Washington	Cecil Township	18.2	29.3	18	I-79 south – Washington, PA	Exit 49 on I-79
Washington	Cecil Township			19	I-79 north – Pittsburgh	Eastbound exit and westbound entrance; exit 49 on I-79
Washington	Cecil Township	19.2	30.9		Morganza Road – National Cemetery	Current eastern terminus; at-grade intersection
1.000 mi = 1.609 km; 1.000 km = 0.621 mi

== See also ==
PA Turnpike - Southern Beltway Projects (Official Page)

- Mon–Fayette Expressway
