= Chartiers Run =

Chartiers Run may refer to:

- Chartiers Run (Allegheny River tributary)
- Chartiers Run (Chartiers Creek tributary)

== See also ==
- Chartiers (disambiguation)
