= Chartiers =

Chartiers may refer to the following places in Pennsylvania:

- Chartiers Creek, a tributary of the Ohio River
  - Little Chartiers Creek, a tributary of Chartiers Creek
  - Chartiers Run (Chartiers Creek), a tributary of Chartiers Creek
  - Chartiers Branch, of the Pennsylvania Railroad, followed Chartiers Creek
- Chartiers Run (Allegheny River), a tributary of the Allegheny River
- Chartier's Old Town, a former trading post named after Pierre Chartiers; was sited on present-day Tarentum, Pennsylvania
- Chartiers Township, Washington County, Pennsylvania
- Chartiers-Houston School District, serves an area of Washington County, Pennsylvania
  - Chartiers Houston High School, in the above school district
- Chartiers (Pittsburgh), a neighborhood in Pittsburgh
- Chartiers Valley School District, serves an area southwest of Pittsburgh
  - Chartiers Valley High School, in the above school district

== See also ==
- Chartier (disambiguation)
