= Whisky Run =

Whisky Run or Whiskey Run may refer to:

- Whisky Run (Jefferson County, Nebraska), a stream in Nebraska
- Whiskey Run (Noble County, Ohio), a stream in Ohio
- Whiskey Run (Chartiers Creek tributary), a stream in Allegheny County, Pennsylvania
- Whiskey Run Township, Crawford County, Indiana, a civil township in Indiana
