= McPherson Creek (Chartiers Creek tributary) =

Stream in Pennsylvania, USA

McPherson Creek Tributary to Chartiers Creek
- Location of McPherson Creek mouth McPherson Creek (Chartiers Creek tributary) (the United States)

Location
- Country: United States
- State: Pennsylvania
- County: Washington

Physical characteristics
- Source: Millers Run divide
  - location: about 0.5 miles south of Cecil, Pennsylvania
  - coordinates: 40°19′18″N 080°10′48″W
  - elevation: 1,155 ft (352 m)
- Mouth: Chartiers Creek
  - location: about 1 mile southeast of Hendersonville, Pennsylvania
  - coordinates: 40°17′36″N 080°07′46″W
  - elevation: 878 ft (268 m)
- Length: 3.56 mi (5.73 km)
- Basin size: 2.93 square miles (7.6 km^{2})
- Discharge
  - location: Chartiers Creek
  - average: 3.27 cu ft/s (0.093 m^{3}/s) at mouth with Chartiers Creek

Basin features
- Progression: Chartiers Creek → Ohio River → Mississippi River → Gulf of Mexico
- River system: Ohio River
- Tributaries
  - left: unnamed tributaries
  - right: unnamed tributaries
- Bridges: Papp Road, I-79, Morganza Road, Hahn Road (x3)

McPherson Creek is a 3.56 mi (5.73 km) long 1st order tributary to Chartiers Creek in Washington County, Pennsylvania.

== Course ==
McPherson Creek rises about 0.5 miles south of Cecil, Pennsylvania, and then flows southeasterly to join Chartiers Creek about 1 mile southeast of Hendersonville.

== Watershed ==
McPherson Creek drains 2.93 square miles (7.6 km^{2}) of area, receives about 38.7 in/year of precipitation, has a wetness index of 336.87, and is about 51% forested.

== See also ==
- List of rivers of Pennsylvania
