= Robinson Township, Pennsylvania =

Robinson Township is the name of some places in the U.S. state of Pennsylvania:

- Robinson Township, Allegheny County, Pennsylvania
- Robinson Township, Washington County, Pennsylvania
