= The Club at Nevillewood =

Golf and residential club in Pennsylvania, US

Coordinates: 40.388°N 80.124°W

- Interactive map of The Club at Nevillewood

Club information
- Location: Presto, Collier Township, Allegheny County, Pennsylvania, near Pittsburgh
- Established: 1992
- Type: Private
- Total holes: 18
- Tournaments: Mellon Mario Lemieux Celebrity Invitational (1998-2005)
- Website: Official site
- Designer: Jack Nicklaus
- Par: 72
- Length: 7228
- Course rating: 74.8

The Club at Nevillewood is a private golf and residential club located in Presto, Pennsylvania, outside Pittsburgh, with an 18-hole championship golf course.

== Club history ==
Jack Nicklaus first came to Collier Township in the late 1980s. Along with his father George, partner Mike Dempster and developer Rick Stambrosky, they built a championship-caliber golf course in the Pittsburgh area surrounded by custom built homes. Close to one million cubic yards of earth was moved to make way for the club, which opened for play in 1992.

From 1998 until 2005, the club was the host site for the annual Mario Lemieux Celebrity Invitational, which was an event on the Celebrity Players Tour. The tournament raised millions of dollars for cancer research over the eight years of the tournament. The streets on the site of the club are named after many of the Jack Nicklaus-designed courses.

== Scorecard ==
Nevillewood
Tee	Rating/Slope	1	2	3	4	5	6	7	8	9	Out	10	11	12	13	14	15	16	17	18	In	Total
Nicklaus	Men's 136/74.3	427	452	553	423	195	401	530	174	414	3569	406	420	570	211	438	555	438	181	440	3659	7228
Tournament	Men's 134/72.7	394	433	522	397	185	391	530	160	388	3400	378	395	542	203	423	533	421	168	415	3478	6878
Member	Men's 129/70.2 Ladies' 139/76.9	352	410	494	375	155	367	514	149	351	3167	342	369	507	188	383	496	390	158	384	3217	6384
SI	Men's	12	2	16	6	14	8	10	18	4		7	13	9	11	1	15	3	17	5
SI	Men's Signature Tees	8	2	12	6	16	10	14	18	4		3	13	9	11	7	15	1	17	5
Par		4	4	5	4	3	4	5	3	4	36	4	4	5	3	4	5	4	3	4	36	72
SI	Ladies'	16	12	2	6	14	8	10	18	4		9	13	3	15	7	11	1	17	5
Signature	Men's 119/67.6 Ladies' 132/72.9	314	350	440	332	128	323	425	128	308	2748	307	324	478	168	333	465	368	139	345	2927	5675
Forward	Ladies' 122/70.3	275	309	411	322	128	304	380	101	267	2497	266	283	434	151	301	421	368	123	295	2642	5139
