= Southview, Pennsylvania =

Unincorporated community in Pennsylvania, US

Coordinates: 40°19′40″N 80°15′32″W

- Census-designated place
- Interactive map of Southview, Pennsylvania
- Country: United States
- State: Pennsylvania
- County: Washington

Population (2010)
  - Total: 276
- Time zone: UTC-5 (Eastern (EST))
  - Summer (DST): UTC-4 (EDT)

Southview is a census-designated place located in Mount Pleasant and Cecil Townships in Washington County in the state of Pennsylvania. Southview is located in northern Washington County along Southview Road, within a mile of Pennsylvania Route 50. As of the 2010 census the population was 276 residents.

== History ==
Southview was built as a coal town for the Montour No. 1 coal mine, which opened in 1914. The village was considered to be a first-class miners' town and included housing for miners and their families, as well as a company store. The exact date of the mine closing is unknown, but it was probably closed between 1932 and 1939, according to the aerial photos.

== Education ==
Areas in Mount Pleasant Township are in the Fort Cherry School District. Areas in Cecil Township are in the Canon-McMillan School District.
