= Dick Haley =

American football player and executive (1937–2023)

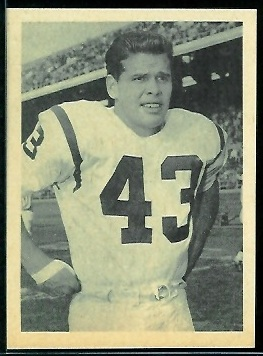
- Haley in 1961

No. 43, 28, 27, 25
- Positions: Safety, cornerback, halfback, end

Personal information
- Born: October 2, 1937; Midway, Pennsylvania, U.S.
- Died: March 10, 2023 (aged 85)
- Listed height: 5 ft 10 in (1.78 m)
- Listed weight: 183 lb (83 kg)

Career information
- College: Pittsburgh
- NFL draft: 1959: 9th round, 100th overall pick

Career history

Playing
- Washington Redskins (1959–1960); Minnesota Vikings (1961); Pittsburgh Steelers (1961–1964)

Operations
- Pittsburgh Steelers (1971–1990) Director of player personnel; New York Jets (1991–2002) Director of player personnel; New York Jets (2003–2007) Personnel analyst; Miami Dolphins (2008–2022) Player personnel analyst

Awards and highlights
- 4× Super Bowl champion (IX, X, XIII, XIV); Third-team All-Eastern (1958)

Career NFL statistics
- Interceptions: 14
- Touchdowns: 2
- Fumble recoveries: 3
- Stats at Pro Football Reference
- Executive profile at Pro Football Reference

George Richard Haley Jr. (October 2, 1937 – March 10, 2023) was an American professional football player who was a cornerback in the National Football League (NFL) for the Washington Redskins, Minnesota Vikings, and Pittsburgh Steelers. He played college football at the University of Pittsburgh and was selected in the ninth round of the 1959 NFL draft.

== Early life and college ==
Born in Midway, Pennsylvania to George and June Haley, Haley resided in Midway, where he was a student at Midway High School (now Fort Cherry) where he was a four-year member of the school's football team.

After his graduation in 1955, he attended the University of Pittsburgh. During his time with the Pitt Panthers, he lettered thrice and was named the team's starting running back for his final two seasons. In 1958, he led the team in rushing attempts and yards as well as scoring. In the East-West Shrine Bowl, he returned an 86-yard punt for a touchdown.

== Playing career ==
Haley was selected by the Washington Redskins in the ninth round of the 1959 NFL draft. Initially drafted as a free safety, he played two seasons with the Redskins, accumulating 21 starts, one interception, two forced fumbles and a fumble recovery. He was subsequently traded to Minnesota, where he returned to the halfback position. After two seasons with the Vikings, he went on to play for his hometown team, the Pittsburgh Steelers, where he finished his playing career. During his time in Pittsburgh he changed positions twice; starting as a halfback before being moved to the strong safety position and later back to a free safety.

== Executive career ==
Haley was a player personnel analyst for the Miami Dolphins.

He later became the director of player personnel for his former team, the Pittsburgh Steelers, from 1971 to 1990 as well as the New York Jets from 1991 to 2007. Haley is frequently credited with having selected the Steelers' renowned 1974 NFL draft class which included four future inductees in the Pro Football Hall of Fame. The rookies—Lynn Swann, Jack Lambert, John Stallworth, and Mike Webster—would help lead the team to Super Bowl IX and three more Super Bowl championships by the end of the decade.

Haley's personnel work in Pittsburgh unfolded under head coach Chuck Noll, who led the franchise from 1969 to 1991, while building extensively through the draft. Noll's long tenure and emphasis on developing drafted players created a sustained environment in which Haley and the scouting department could identify and acquire talent that fit the roster Noll was constructing.

During Haley's Steelers years, the club's front office was overseen by team executive Dan Rooney, who implemented an open, practical management style and presided over an era that produced numerous division titles, eight AFC Championships, and six Super Bowl victories for the franchise (four of which came during Haley's Pittsburgh tenure). Rooney's organizational approach fostered collaboration between coaching and personnel staffs, an alignment that benefited evaluators like Haley as the Steelers assembled rosters that regularly contended for league honors. Haley also worked within the family-run structure established by founding owner Art Rooney Sr. The continuity of Rooney family stewardship provided stability in ownership and philosophy across decades, shaping the context in which Haley evaluated and acquired players for Pittsburgh.

== Personal life and death ==
Dick Haley was the father of Todd Haley, a former head coach of the Kansas City Chiefs.

Haley was later inducted into the Pittsburgh Pro Football Hall of Fame. He died on March 10, 2023, at the age of 85.
