= Mellon Mario Lemieux Celebrity Invitational =

The Mellon Mario Lemieux Celebrity Invitational was an event on the Celebrity Players Tour held from 1998 to 2005 at The Club at Nevillewood in Presto, Pennsylvania. The tournament benefited the Mario Lemieux Foundation for cancer research.

== History ==
The first two tournaments were sponsored by Toyota. Mellon Financial picked up the title sponsorship starting in 2000. Tournament host Mario Lemieux finished in the top ten of this tournament in 2000, finishing in a tie for tenth.

== Winners ==
- 1998 Rick Rhoden
- 1999 Rick Rhoden
- 2000 Dan Quinn
- 2001 Rick Rhoden
- 2002 Jack Wagner
- 2003 Rick Rhoden
- 2004 Pierre Larouche
- 2005 Pierre Larouche
