= Matt Sieg =

American football player

No. 3 – West Virginia Mountaineers
- Position: Defensive back
- Class: Freshman

Personal information
- Listed height: 6 ft 0 in (1.83 m)
- Listed weight: 189 lb (86 kg)

Career information
- High school: Fort Cherry (McDonald, Pennsylvania)
- College: West Virginia (2026–present)

Matt Sieg is an American football defensive back for the West Virginia Mountaineers.

== Early life ==
Sieg attended Fort Cherry High School in McDonald, Pennsylvania. As a senior, he completed 16 of 26 passes for 403 yards and eight touchdowns, rushed for 1,774 yards and 27 touchdowns on 163 carries, and racked up 45 tackles and four interceptions. Sieg was named the Maxwell Football Club national high school player of the year. During his high school career, he completed 273 of 491 passes for 4,634 yards and 59 touchdowns, rushed for 7,958 yards and 131 on 842 carrie, and added five punt return touchdowns, three defensive touchdown, and 14 interceptions. Sieg set the Western Pennsylvania Interscholastic Athletic League record for career yardage and touchdowns.

Sieg was rated as a four-star recruit by Rivals.com, and committed to play college football for the Penn State Nittany Lions over offers from schools such as Pittsburgh, West Virginia, and Wisconsin. However, on National Signing Day, he flipped his commitment and signed to play for the West Virginia Mountaineers.

== College career ==
As a freshman in 2026, Sieg is projected to play a on offense and defense.
