= Georges Run (Chartiers Creek tributary) =

Stream in Pennsylvania, USA

Georges Run Tributary to Chartiers Creek
- Location of Georges Run mouth Georges Run (Chartiers Creek tributary) (the United States)

Location
- Country: United States
- State: Pennsylvania
- County: Washington
- City: Washington

Physical characteristics
- Source: Chartiers Run divide
  - location: about 2.5 miles southwest of Westland, Pennsylvania
  - coordinates: 40°15′24″N 080°18′52″W
  - elevation: 1,230 ft (370 m)
- Mouth: Chartiers Creek
  - location: Washington, Pennsylvania
  - coordinates: 40°11′48″N 080°16′10″W
  - elevation: 1,000 ft (300 m)
- Length: 5.11 mi (8.22 km)
- Basin size: 7.64 square miles (19.8 km^{2})
- Discharge
  - location: Chartiers Creek
  - average: 8.81 cu ft/s (0.249 m^{3}/s) at mouth with Chartiers Creek

Basin features
- Progression: Chartiers Creek → Ohio River → Mississippi River → Gulf of Mexico
- River system: Ohio River
- Tributaries
  - left: unnamed tributaries
  - right: unnamed tributaries
- Bridges: Salvini Lane, Chapman Lane, Mulberry Hill Road, Airport Road, Lynn Portal Road, Hewitt Avenue

Georges Run is a 5.11 mi (8.22 km) long 2nd order tributary to Chartiers Creek in Washington County, Pennsylvania.

== Variant names ==
According to the Geographic Names Information System, it has also been known historically as:

- Gorges Run

== Course ==
George Run rises about 2.5 miles southwest of Westland, Pennsylvania, and then flows southeasterly to join Chartiers Creek in northwestern Washington.

== Watershed ==
Georges Run drains 7.64 square miles (19.8 km^{2}) of area, receives about 39.4 in/year of precipitation, has a wetness index of 336.47, and is about 47% forested.

== See also ==
- List of rivers of Pennsylvania
