= Thoms Run (Chartiers Creek tributary) =

Stream in Pennsylvania, USA

Thoms Run Tributary to Chartiers Creek
- Location of Thoms Run mouth Thoms Run (Chartiers Creek tributary) (the United States)

Location
- Country: United States
- State: Pennsylvania
- County: Allegheny

Physical characteristics
- Source: Robinson Run divide
  - location: about 0.25 miles north of Beechmont, Pennsylvania
  - coordinates: 40°23′52″N 080°09′50″W
  - elevation: 1,110 ft (340 m)
- Mouth: Chartiers Creek
  - location: Presto, Pennsylvania
  - coordinates: 40°22′19″N 080°07′12″W
  - elevation: 801 ft (244 m)
- Length: 3.05 mi (4.91 km)
- Basin size: 12.11 square miles (31.4 km^{2})
- Discharge
  - location: Chartiers Creek
  - average: 3.64 cu ft/s (0.103 m^{3}/s) at mouth with Chartiers Creek

Basin features
- Progression: Chartiers Creek → Ohio River → Mississippi River → Gulf of Mexico
- River system: Ohio River
- Tributaries
  - left: unnamed tributaries
  - right: unnamed tributaries
- Bridges: Nike Site Road, Thomas Run and Oakdale Road, Summerfield Estates Drive, Walnut Lane, Thomas Run and Oakdale Road, Monteverdi Drive, Thoms Run Road, Pinch Road, Bridge Street, Presto-Sygan Road

Thoms Run is a 3.05 mi (4.91 km) long 2nd order tributary to Chartiers Creek in Allegheny County, Pennsylvania.

== Course ==
Thoms Run rises about 0.25 miles north of Beechmont, Pennsylvania and then flows southeasterly to join Chartiers Creek at Presto.

== Watershed ==
Thoms Run drains 3.45 square miles (8.9 km^{2}) of area, receives about 38.4 in/year of precipitation, has a wetness index of 308.49, and is about 43% forested.

== See also ==
- List of rivers of Pennsylvania
