= Plum Run (Chartiers Run tributary) =

Stream in Pennsylvania, USA

Plum Run Tributary to Chartiers Run
- Location of Plum Run mouth Plum Run (Chartiers Run tributary) (the United States)

Location
- Country: United States
- State: Pennsylvania
- County: Washington
- Borough: Houston

Physical characteristics
- Source: Millers Run divide
  - location: about 2 miles southwest of Venice, Pennsylvania
  - coordinates: 40°18′04″N 080°14′25″W
  - elevation: 1,160 ft (350 m)
- Mouth: Chartiers Run
  - location: Houston, Pennsylvania
  - coordinates: 40°14′56″N 080°12′39″W
  - elevation: 948 ft (289 m)
- Length: 4.19 mi (6.74 km)
- Basin size: 4.07 square miles (10.5 km^{2})
- Discharge
  - location: Chartiers Run
  - average: 4.62 cu ft/s (0.131 m^{3}/s) at mouth with Chartiers Run

Basin features
- Progression: generally southeast
- River system: Ohio River
- Tributaries
  - left: unnamed tributaries
  - right: unnamed tributaries
- Bridges: Plum Run Road

Plum Run is a 12.10 mi (19.47 km) long 2nd order tributary to Chartiers Run in Washington County, Pennsylvania.

== Course ==
Plum Run rises about 2 miles southwest of Venice, Pennsylvania, and then flows southeast to join Chartiers Run at Houston.

== Watershed ==
Plum Run drains 4.07 square miles (10.5 km^{2}) of area, receives about 39.2 in/year of precipitation, has a wetness index of 324.74, and is about 45% forested.

== See also ==
- List of rivers of Pennsylvania
