= Scrubgrass Run =

Stream in Pennsylvania, USA

Scrubgrass Run Tributary to Chartiers Creek
- Location of Scrubgrass Run mouth Scrubgrass Run (the United States)

Location
- Country: United States
- State: Pennsylvania
- County: Allegheny

Physical characteristics
- Source: Saw Mill Run divide
  - location: Mt. Lebanon, Pennsylvania
  - coordinates: 40°23′14″N 080°03′34″W
  - elevation: 1,058 ft (322 m)
- Mouth: Chartiers Creek
  - location: Heidelberg, Pennsylvania
  - coordinates: 40°23′15″N 080°05′19″W
  - elevation: 780 ft (240 m)
- Length: 2.24 mi (3.60 km)
- Basin size: 1.55 square miles (4.0 km^{2})
- Discharge
  - location: Chartiers Creek
  - average: 1.65 cu ft/s (0.047 m^{3}/s) at mouth with Chartiers Creek

Basin features
- Progression: Chartiers Creek → Ohio River → Mississippi River → Gulf of Mexico
- River system: Ohio River
- Tributaries
  - left: unnamed tributaries
  - right: unnamed tributaries
- Bridges: Elm Spring Road, Scrubgrass Road, Segar Road, Raven Drive, Scrubgrass Road, Old Scrubgrass Road, Greentree Road

Scrubgrass Run is a 2.24 mi (3.60 km) long 1st order tributary to Chartiers Creek in Allegheny County, Pennsylvania.

== Course ==
Scrubgrass Run rises in Mt. Lebanon, Pennsylvania and then flows west-southwest to join Chartiers Creek across from Heidelberg.

== Watershed ==
Scrubgrass Run drains 1.55 square miles (4.0 km^{2}) of area, receives about 38.5 in/year of precipitation, has a wetness index of 331.29, and is about 15% forested.

== See also ==
- List of rivers of Pennsylvania
