= Ralph Felton =

American football player (1932–2011)

- Felton in 1960

No. 45, 57
- Positions: Linebacker, fullback, placekicker

Personal information
- Born: May 21, 1932; Midway, Pennsylvania, U.S.
- Died: January 22, 2011 (aged 78); Midway, Pennsylvania, U.S.
- Listed height: 5 ft 11 in (1.80 m)
- Listed weight: 210 lb (95 kg)

Career information
- High school: Midway
- College: Maryland (1950–1953)
- NFL draft: 1954: 4th round, 39th overall pick

Career history
- Washington Redskins (1954–1957); Pittsburgh Steelers (1958)*; Washington Redskins (1958–1960); Buffalo Bills (1961-1962)
- * Offseason or practice squad member only

Awards and highlights
- National champion (1953); First-team All-ACC (1953)

Career NFL/AFL statistics
- Interceptions: 7
- Fumble recoveries: 7
- Extra points: 16-of-17
- Field Goals: 1-of-2
- Stats at Pro Football Reference

Ralph Dwain "Rass" Felton (May 21, 1932 – January 22, 2011) was an American football player. Felton played college football at the University of Maryland at College Park and was drafted in the fourth round of the 1954 NFL draft. He was a linebacker in the National Football League (NFL) for the Washington Redskins and in the American Football League (AFL) for the Buffalo Bills.

== Biography ==
Ralph Felton was born May 21, 1932, in Midway, Pennsylvania. He attended Midway High School, where he was a star multi-sport athlete, playing center on the basketball team, first base on the baseball team, and halfback on the football team.
