= McLaughlin Run (Chartiers Creek tributary) =

Stream in Pennsylvania, USA

McLaughlin Run Tributary to Chartiers Creek
- Location of McLaughlin Run mouth McLaughlin Run (Chartiers Creek tributary) (the United States)

Location
- Country: United States
- State: Pennsylvania
- County: Allegheny
- Borough: Bethel Park

Physical characteristics
- Source: Saw Mill Run divide
  - location: Bethel Park, Pennsylvania
  - coordinates: 40°19′16″N 080°04′27″W
  - elevation: 1,180 ft (360 m)
- Mouth: Chartiers Creek
  - location: Bridgeville, Pennsylvania
  - coordinates: 40°21′48″N 080°06′13″W
  - elevation: 800 ft (240 m)
- Length: 6.39 mi (10.28 km)
- Basin size: 12.11 square miles (31.4 km^{2})
- Discharge
  - location: Chartiers Creek
  - average: 8.17 cu ft/s (0.231 m^{3}/s) at mouth with Chartiers Creek

Basin features
- Progression: Chartiers Creek → Ohio River → Mississippi River → Gulf of Mexico
- River system: Ohio River
- Tributaries
  - left: unnamed tributaries
  - right: Graessers Run
- Bridges: Broad Street, Burnside Drive, Church Road, Greenwald Road, Logan Road, Walther Lane, McMurray Road, US 19, Panther Pass, Morrow Road, McMillan Road, McLaughlin Run Road (x2), Baldwin Street, Bower Hill Road

McLaughlin Run is a 6.39 mi (10.28 km) long 2nd order tributary to Chartiers Creek in Allegheny County, Pennsylvania.

== Variant names ==
According to the Geographic Names Information System, it has also been known historically as:

- McLaughlin's Run

== Course ==
McLaughlin Run rises in Bethel Park, Pennsylvania and then flows northwesterly to join Chartiers Creek in Bridgeville.

== Watershed ==
McLaughlin Run drains 12.11 square miles (31.4 km^{2}) of area, receives about 39.1 in/year of precipitation, has a wetness index of 351.90, and is about 9% forested.

== See also ==
- List of rivers of Pennsylvania
