= Coal Run (Chartiers Creek tributary) =

Stream in Pennsylvania, US

Coal Run Tributary to Chartiers Creek
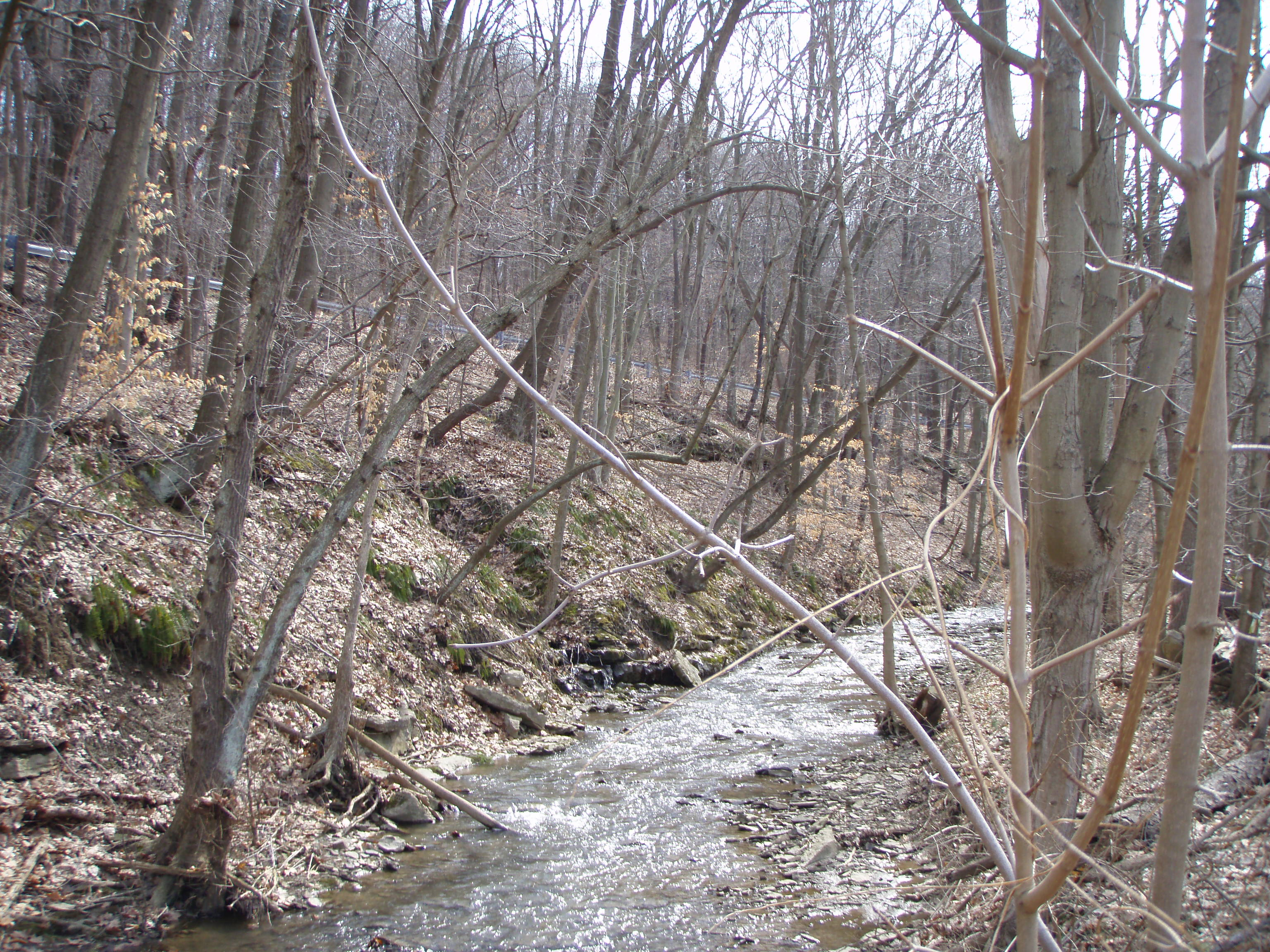
- Coal Run running through Hickory Heights, PA

- Location of Coal Run mouth Coal Run (Chartiers Creek tributary) (the United States)

Location
- Country: United States
- State: Pennsylvania
- County: Allegheny; Washington

Physical characteristics
- Source: Millers Run divide
  - location: about 0.25 miles southeast of Cecil, Pennsylvania
  - coordinates: 40°19′33″N 080°10′18″W
  - elevation: 1,145 ft (349 m)
- Mouth: Chartiers Creek
  - location: Bridgeville, Pennsylvania
  - coordinates: 40°20′58″N 080°06′38″W
  - elevation: 812 ft (247 m)
- Length: 4.37 mi (7.03 km)
- Basin size: 3.69 square miles (9.6 km^{2})
- Discharge
  - location: Chartiers Creek
  - average: 4.01 cu ft/s (0.114 m^{3}/s) at mouth with Chartiers Creek

Basin features
- Progression: Chartiers Creek → Ohio River → Mississippi River → Gulf of Mexico
- River system: Ohio River
- Tributaries
  - left: unnamed tributaries
  - right: unnamed tributaries
- Bridges: Karmann Road, Coal Pit Run Road, Alpine Road, I-79, Washington Pike

Coal Run is a 4.37 mi (7.03 km) long 2nd order tributary to Chartiers Creek in Allegheny and Washington Counties, Pennsylvania.

== Course ==
Coal Run rises about 0.25 miles southeast of Cecil, Pennsylvania and then flows northeast to join Chartiers Creek across from Bridgeville.

== Watershed ==
Coal Run drains 3.69 square miles (9.6 km^{2}) of area, receives about 38.8 in/year of precipitation, has a wetness index of 326.44, and is about 43% forested.

== See also ==
- List of rivers of Pennsylvania
