= Painters Run (Chartiers Creek tributary) =

Stream in Pennsylvania, USA

Painters Run Tributary to Chartiers Creek
- Location of Painters Run mouth Painters Run (Chartiers Creek tributary) (the United States)

Location
- Country: United States
- State: Pennsylvania
- County: Allegheny
- Township: Mt. Lebanon; Scott

Physical characteristics
- Source: Saw Mill Run divide
  - location: Mt. Lebanon, Pennsylvania
  - coordinates: 40°41′29″N 080°02′22″W
  - elevation: 1,100 ft (340 m)
- Mouth: Chartiers Creek
  - location: Kirwan Heights, Pennsylvania
  - coordinates: 40°21′50″N 080°05′42″W
  - elevation: 800 ft (240 m)
- Length: 3.65 mi (5.87 km)
- Basin size: 4.43 square miles (11.5 km^{2})
- Discharge
  - location: Chartiers Creek
  - average: 4.77 cu ft/s (0.135 m^{3}/s) at mouth with Chartiers Creek

Basin features
- Progression: Chartiers Creek → Ohio River → Mississippi River → Gulf of Mexico
- River system: Ohio River
- Tributaries
  - left: unnamed tributaries
  - right: unnamed tributaries
- Bridges: Terrace Drive, US 19, Painters Run Road (x2), Painters Drive, Painters Run Road (x3), Bower Hill Road (x3)

Painters Run is a 3.65 mi (5.87 km) long 2nd order tributary to Chartiers Creek in Allegheny County, Pennsylvania.

== Course ==
Painters Run rises in Mt. Lebanon, Pennsylvania, and then flows west to join Chartiers Creek at Kirwan Heights.

== Watershed ==
Painters Run drains 4.43 square miles (11.5 km^{2}) of area, receives about 38.9 in/year of precipitation, has a wetness index of 339.89, and is about 7% forested.

== See also ==
- List of rivers of Pennsylvania
