= Chartier =

Chartier may refer to:

== Canada ==
- Clément Chartier (b. 1946), a Métis leader
- Eugène Chartier (1893–1963), a violinist, violist, conductor and teacher
- Paul Joseph Chartier (1921–1966), died when a bomb he was preparing exploded in a washroom of the Parliament of Canada
- Richard J. F. Chartier, a judge of the Manitoba Court of Appeal
- Antoine Chartier de Lotbinière Harwood (1825–1891), a Quebec lawyer and political figure
- Michel-Eustache-Gaspard-Alain Chartier de Lotbinière (1748–1822), a seigneur and political figure
- Chartier v. Chartier, a leading case decided by the Supreme Court of Canada on the legal role of step parents in a marriage (1999)
- Chartier (restaurant), a restaurant in Beaumont, Alberta

== France ==
- Alain Chartier (c. 1392 – c. 1430), a poet and political writer
- Saint-Chartier, a town and commune in the Indre département
- Julian Chartier (born 1999), French trampoline gymnast
- Émile-Auguste Chartier, commonly known as Alain (1868–1951), a philosopher, journalist and pacifist
- Roger Chartier (1945 – ), a French historian and historiographer
- Bouillon Chartier, a restaurant in Paris since 1896

== United States ==
- Gary Chartier (born 1966), a legal theorist and philosopher.
- Martin Chartier (1655 – 1718), French-Canadian frontiersman and fur trader
  - Peter Chartier (1690 - abt 1759), his son, a French fur trader and early settler in Western Pennsylvania
- Richard Chartier (born 1971), a sound/installation artist and graphic designer
- Tim Chartier (born 1969), mathematician

== See also ==
- Chartiers (disambiguation)
