= Catfish Creek (Chartiers Creek tributary) =

Stream in Pennsylvania, US

Catfish Creek Tributary to Chartiers Creek
- Location of Catfish Creek mouth Catfish Creek (Chartiers Creek tributary) (the United States)

Location
- Country: United States
- State: Pennsylvania
- County: Washington
- City: Washington

Physical characteristics
- Source: unnamed tributary to Chartiers Creek divide
  - location: about 0.5 miles west of Laboratory, Pennsylvania
  - coordinates: 40°09′07″N 080°13′46″W
  - elevation: 1,290 ft (390 m)
- Mouth: Chartiers Creek
  - location: Washington, Pennsylvania
  - coordinates: 40°10′44″N 080°16′04″W
  - elevation: 1,007 ft (307 m)
- Length: 3.83 mi (6.16 km)
- Basin size: 4.69 square miles (12.1 km^{2})
- Discharge
  - location: Chartiers Creek
  - average: 5.31 cu ft/s (0.150 m^{3}/s) at mouth with Chartiers Creek

Basin features
- Progression: Chartiers Creek → Ohio River → Mississippi River → Gulf of Mexico
- River system: Ohio River
- Tributaries
  - left: unnamed tributaries
  - right: unnamed tributaries
- Bridges: US 19, Shrontz Lane, Dunn Avenue, US 19, Rosewood Avenue, Rural Avenue, Elm Street, Hanna Street, S Wade Avenue, S Main Street, Park Avenue, W Maiden Street, W Wheeling Street, US 40, Berthel Avenue, I-70

Catfish Creek is a 3.83 mi (6.16 km) long 2nd order tributary to Chartiers Creek in Washington County, Pennsylvania.

== Course ==
Catfish Creek rises about 0.5 miles west of Laboratory, Pennsylvania, and then flows northwest through the City of Washington to join Chartiers Creek in Washington.

== Watershed ==
Catfish Run drains 4.69 square miles (12.1 km^{2}) of area, receives about 39.0 in/year of precipitation, has a wetness index of 357.21, and is about 20% forested.

== See also ==
- List of rivers of Pennsylvania
