= Little Chartiers Creek =

Stream in Pennsylvania, USA

Little Chartiers Creek Tributary to Chartiers Creek
- Location of Little Chartiers Creek mouth Little Chartiers Creek (the United States)

Location
- Country: United States
- State: Pennsylvania
- County: Washington

Physical characteristics
- Source: Redd Run divide
  - location: South Strabane, Pennsylvania
  - coordinates: 40°07′16″N 080°08′25″W
  - elevation: 1,210 ft (370 m)
- Mouth: Chartiers Creek
  - location: Van Emman, Pennsylvania
  - coordinates: 40°16′43″N 080°08′14″W
  - elevation: 898 ft (274 m)
- Length: 12.10 mi (19.47 km)
- Basin size: 46.60 square miles (120.7 km^{2})
- Discharge
  - location: Chartiers Creek
  - average: 48.93 cu ft/s (1.386 m^{3}/s) at mouth with Chartiers Creek

Basin features
- Progression: Chartiers Creek → Ohio River → Mississippi River → Gulf of Mexico
- River system: Ohio River
- Tributaries
  - left: unnamed tributaries
  - right: Opossum Run
- Waterbodies: Canonsburg Lake
- Bridges: Strabane Drive, Anderson Drive, US 40, Hartley Hill Road, Dynamite Road, US 40, I-70, Valley Road Ext., PA 136, Christy Road, PA 519, Linden Road, Linden Creek Road, Galley Road, McDowell Lane, W McMurray Road

Little Chartiers Creek is a 12.10 mi (19.47 km) long 3rd order tributary to Chartiers Creek in Washington County, Pennsylvania.

== Course ==
Little Chartiers Creek rises in South Strabane, Pennsylvania, and then flows northerly to join Chartiers Creek at Van Emman.

== Watershed ==
Little Chartiers Creek drains 46.60 square miles (120.7 km^{2}) of area, receives about 39.0 in/year of precipitation, has a wetness index of 336.87, and is about 51% forested.

== See also ==
- List of rivers of Pennsylvania
