= Hendersonville, Pennsylvania =

Unincorporated community in Pennsylvania, US

Coordinates: 40°17′52″N 80°08′59″W

- census-designated place
- Interactive map of Hendersonville, Pennsylvania
- Country: United States
- State: Pennsylvania
- County: Washington

Area
  - Total: 0.40 sq mi (1.03 km^{2})
  - Land: 0.40 sq mi (1.03 km^{2})
  - Water: 0 sq mi (0.00 km^{2})

Population (2020)
  - Total: 274
  - Density: 687.7/sq mi (265.51/km^{2})
- Time zone: UTC-5 (Eastern (EST))
  - Summer (DST): UTC-4 (EDT)
- FIPS code: 42-33840

Hendersonville is a census-designated place located in Cecil Township, Washington County in the state of Pennsylvania. The community is located just to the east of Interstate 79. As of the 2010 census the population was 325 residents.

== Demographics ==
Historical population
Census	Pop.	Note	%±
2010	325		—
2020	274		−15.7%
U.S. Decennial Census

== Education ==
It is in the Canon-McMillan School District.
