= McDonald, Pennsylvania =

Borough in Pennsylvania, US

- Borough
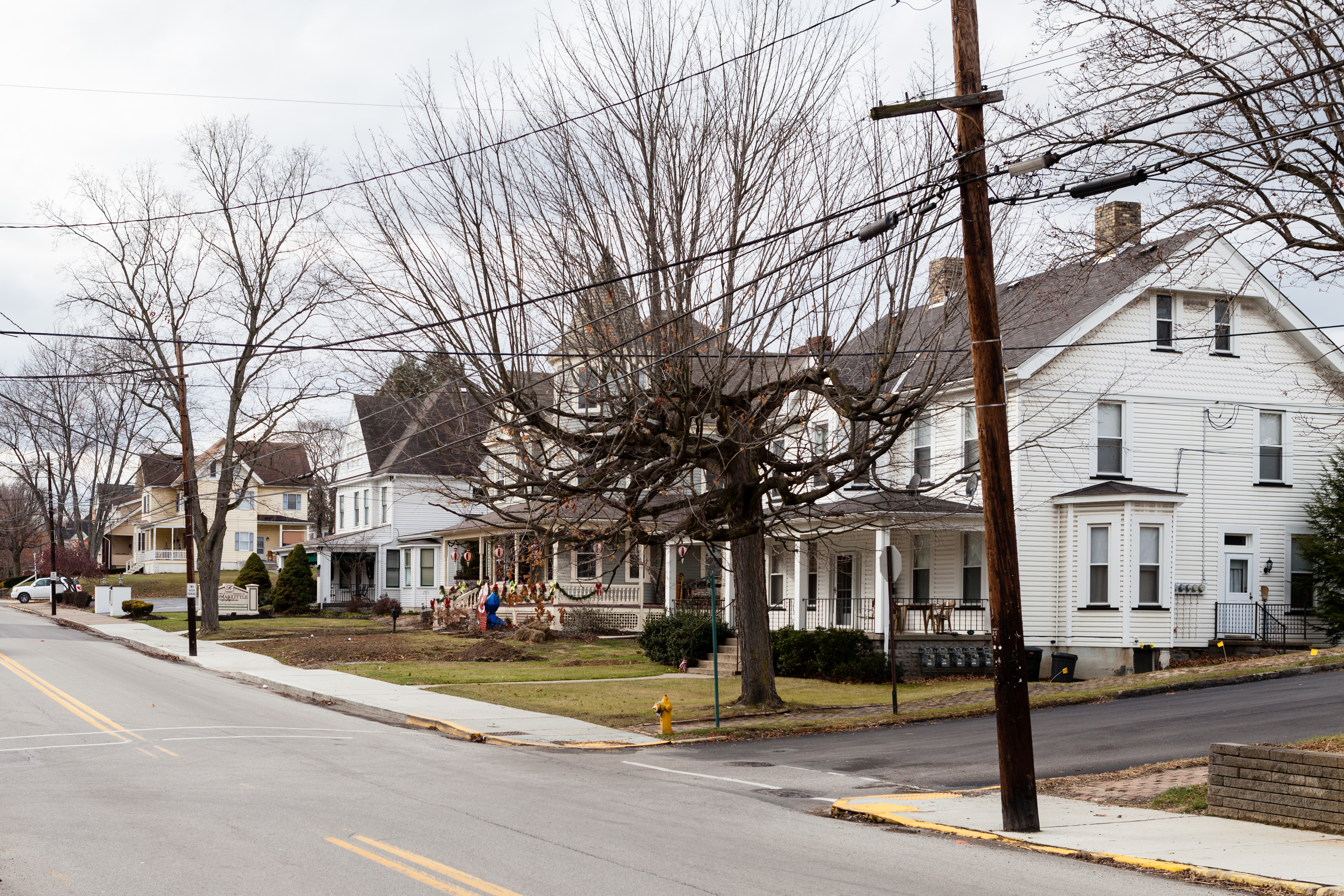
- Looking west from W. Lincoln Avenue and 3rd St.

- Location in Allegheny County and the state of Pennsylvania

- Location in the state of Pennsylvania
- Coordinates: 40°22′12″N 80°13′58″W
- Country: United States
- State: Pennsylvania
- County: Washington, Allegheny
- Established: 1865

Government
  - Type: Mayor-Council
  - Mayor: David Cooper

Area
  - Total: 0.52 sq mi (1.34 km^{2})
  - Land: 0.52 sq mi (1.34 km^{2})
  - Water: 0 sq mi (0.00 km^{2})
- Elevation: 1,138 ft (347 m)

Population (2020)
  - Total: 2,060
  - Density: 3,973.3/sq mi (1,534.11/km^{2})
- Time zone: UTC-5 (Eastern (EST))
  - Summer (DST): UTC-4 (EDT)
- ZIP Code: 15057
- Area code: 724
- FIPS code: 42-46072

McDonald is a borough in Allegheny and Washington counties in the U.S. state of Pennsylvania, 18 miles (29 km) west of Pittsburgh. The population was 2,056 at the 2020 census. Of this population, 1,661 were in Washington County, and 395 were in Allegheny County.

== Geography ==
McDonald is located at 40°22′12″N 80°13′58″W (40.370101, -80.232915). According to the United States Census Bureau, the borough has an area of 0.5 square miles (1.3 km^{2}), all land.

Robinson Run, a tributary of Chartiers Creek, flows through the southeastern part of the borough.

=== Surrounding neighborhoods ===
McDonald has four borders including North Fayette Township to the north and northeast, South Fayette Township to the east, Cecil Township (Washington County) to the south and southwest, and Robinson Township (Washington County) to the west and northwest.

== Demographics ==
Historical population
Census	Pop.	Note	%±
1880	425		—
1890	1,698		299.5%
1900	2,475		45.8%
1910	2,543		2.7%
1920	2,751		8.2%
1930	3,281		19.3%
1940	3,530		7.6%
1950	3,543		0.4%
1960	3,141		−11.3%
1970	2,879		−8.3%
1980	2,772		−3.7%
1990	2,252		−18.8%
2000	2,281		1.3%
2010	2,149		−5.8%
2020	2,060		−4.1%
2025 (est.)	1,994	▼	−3.2%

As of the census of 2010, there were 2,149 people, 383 of whom lived in the Allegheny county part of the borough, 1,766 of whom lived in the Washington County part of the borough.

As of the census of 2000, there were 2,281 people, 1,021 households, and 607 families residing in the borough. The population density was 4,387.3 inhabitants per square mile (1,693.9/km^{2}). There were 1,134 housing units at an average density of 2,181.1 units per square mile (842.1 units/km^{2}). The racial makeup of the borough was 92.15% White, 6.31% African American, 0.13% Native American, 0.04% Asian, 0.09% Pacific Islander, 0.18% from other races, and 1.10% from two or more races. Hispanic or Latino of any race were 0.26% of the population.

There were 1,021 households, out of which 24.9% had children under the age of 18 living with them, 43.8% were married couples living together, 11.8% had a female householder with no husband present, and 40.5% were non-families. 36.4% of all households were made up of individuals, and 18.4% had someone living alone who was 65 years of age or older. The average household size was 2.22 and the average family size was 2.90.

In the borough the population was spread out, with 21.6% under the age of 18, 6.8% from 18 to 24, 28.6% from 25 to 44, 23.8% from 45 to 64, and 19.2% who were 65 years of age or older. The median age was 40 years. For every 100 females, there were 91.0 males. For every 100 females age 18 and over, there were 86.7 males.

The median income for a household in the borough was $33,239, and the median income for a family was $45,878. Males had a median income of $35,484 versus $25,039 for females. The per capita income for the borough was $17,907. About 6.7% of families and 12.2% of the population were below the poverty line, including 18.7% of those under age 18 and 16.4% of those age 65 or over.

== Economy ==
In the past, factories producing bottles, oil-well drilling tools, flour-mill products, etc., existed in McDonald. Oil and coal were and still are procured in the area.

== Government and politics ==
McDonald's government includes an elected mayor, an elected seven-member borough council and an appointed secretary-treasurer. The borough's tax collector is also elected. The mayor, council members and tax collector are all elected to four-year terms. All of the council seats are at-large.

Presidential Elections Results
Year	Republican	Democratic	Third Parties
2012	50% 397	48% 378	2% 16
2016	56% 480	37% 315	7% 57
2020	67% 123	31% 58	0.5% 1

== Education ==
The borough is served by the Fort Cherry School District.

== Media ==
McDonald has been home to a few newspapers in its history. "The Record" and "The Outlook" were early papers which became "The Record-Outlook." "The Record-Outlook" eventually was owned by The Observer Publishing Company of Washington, Pennsylvania. After several years under that ownership, it merged with The Burgettstown Enterprise becoming "The Record-Enterprise." The paper closed in 1999. For two years (from 2000 to 2002 ), the borough had a newspaper again ("The Community Outlook").

Two movies have been filmed in McDonald, Homecoming and Warrior and both were filmed at the Pitt Hotel Bar.

== Notable people ==
- Tina Darragh, poet
- Barry Galbraith, jazz guitarist
- Marvin Lewis, former NFL coach for the Cincinnati Bengals
- Alan Livingston, former president of Capitol Records
- Jay Livingston, Oscar-winning songwriter
- Marty Schottenheimer, former NFL player and coach
