= Hickory, Pennsylvania =

Unincorporated community in Pennsylvania, US

Coordinates: 40°17′56″N 80°18′31″W

- census-designated place
- Interactive map of Hickory, Pennsylvania
- Country: United States
- State: Pennsylvania
- County: Washington

Area
  - Total: 2.85 sq mi (7.37 km^{2})
  - Land: 2.85 sq mi (7.37 km^{2})
  - Water: 0 sq mi (0.00 km^{2})

Population (2020)
  - Total: 664
  - Density: 233.4/sq mi (90.13/km^{2})
- Time zone: UTC-5 (Eastern (EST))
  - Summer (DST): UTC-4 (EDT)
- ZIP code: 15340
- Area code: 724
- FIPS code: 42-34256

Hickory is a census-designated place located in Mount Pleasant Township, Washington County in the state of Pennsylvania. As of the 2010 census the population was 740 residents.

== Demographics ==
Historical population
Census	Pop.	Note	%±
2010	740		—
2020	664		−10.3%
U.S. Decennial Census

== Education ==
It is in the Fort Cherry School District.
