= National Cemetery of the Alleghenies =

Cemetery in Washington County, Pennsylvania

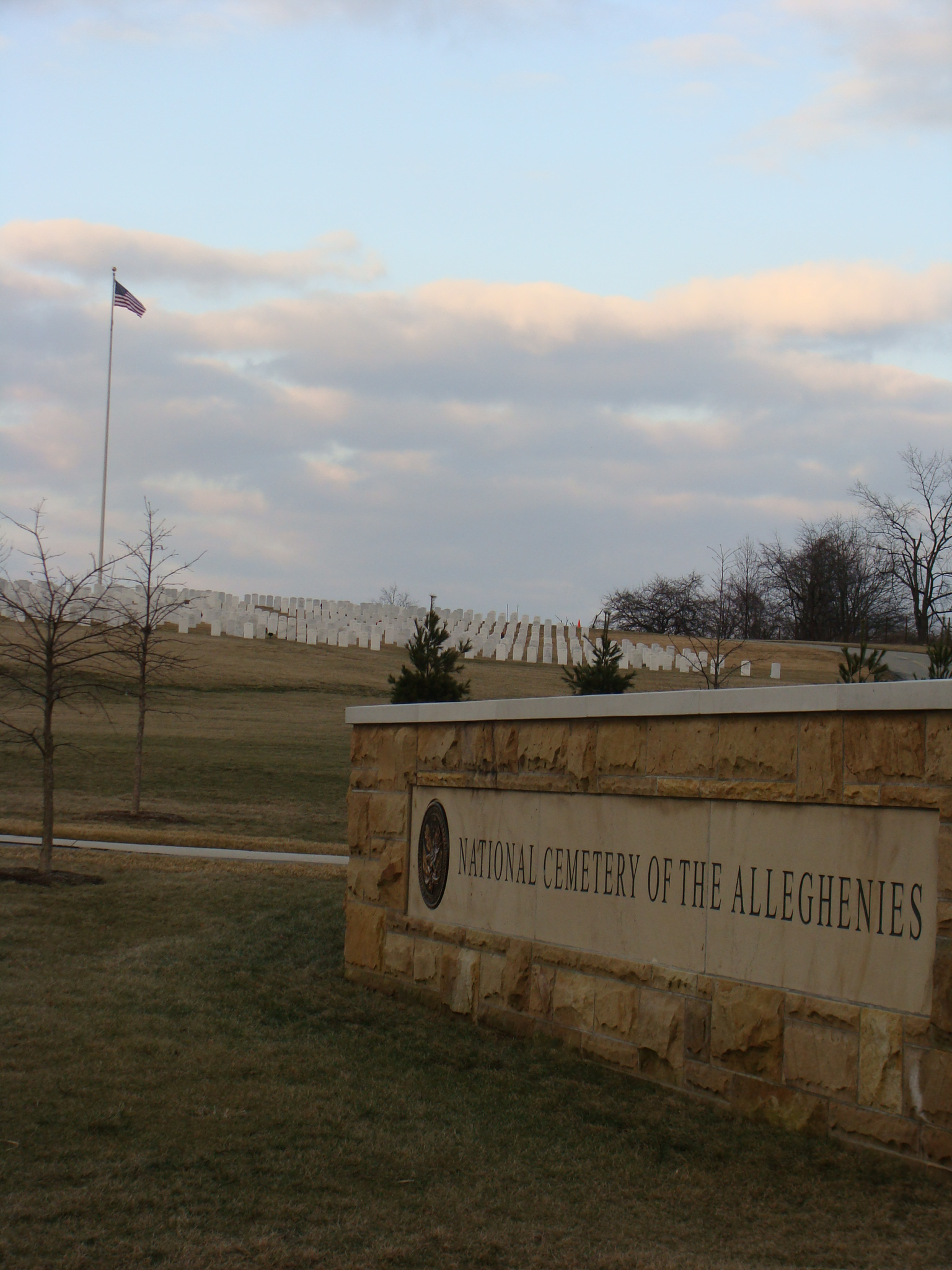
- Entrance to the National Cemetery of the Alleghenies
- Interactive map of National Cemetery of the Alleghenies

Details
- Established: 2005
- Location: 1158 Morgan Road Bridgeville, PA 15017 Cecil Township, Pennsylvania
- Country: United States
- Coordinates: 40°19′00″N 80°09′13″W
- Type: United States National Cemetery
- Owned by: U.S. Department of Veterans Affairs
- Size: 292 acres (118 ha) (90 acres developed as of 2008)
- No. of graves: 20,000+
- Website: Official website
- Find a Grave: National Cemetery of the Alleghenies

The National Cemetery of the Alleghenies covers 292 acres (118 ha) in Cecil Township, Washington County, Pennsylvania approximately 20 miles (30 km) southwest of Pittsburgh.

The cemetery was dedicated on October 9, 2005 by the United States Department of Veterans Affairs' National Cemetery Administration and is one of the newest cemeteries in the National Cemetery system. The first burials took place on August 15, 2005. It was constructed on farmland and contains a small farm cemetery with graves dating to the late 18th Century. When fully completed, it will provide over 100,000 burial spaces. The cemetery spans 292 acres (1.18 km^{2}) of land and is open to visitors daily from sunrise to sunset.

== See also ==
- List of Pennsylvania cemeteries
