= Whiskey Run (Noble County, Ohio) =

Stream in Noble County, Ohio, U.S.

Coordinates: 39°54′42″N 81°18′21″W

Whiskey Run is a stream in Beaver Township, Noble County of Ohio. It flows along Whiskey Run Road east of Batesville.

In the 19th century, several distilleries were built along Whiskey Run, hence the name.

== See also ==
- List of rivers of Ohio
