= Robinson Run (Chartiers Creek tributary) =

Stream in Pennsylvania, USA

Robinson Run Tributary to Chartiers Creek
- Location of Robinson Run mouth Robinson Run (Chartiers Creek tributary) (the United States)

Location
- Country: United States
- State: Pennsylvania
- County: Allegheny; Washington
- Borough: Midway; McDonald; Oakdale

Physical characteristics
- Source: Cherry Run divide
  - location: about 0.5 miles east southeast of Candor, Pennsylvania
  - coordinates: 40°23′14″N 080°17′57″W
  - elevation: 1,200 ft (370 m)
- Mouth: Chartiers Creek
  - location: Glendale, Pennsylvania
  - coordinates: 40°25′52″N 080°05′59″W
  - elevation: 780 ft (240 m)
- Length: 15.90 mi (25.59 km)
- Basin size: 39.90 square miles (103.3 km^{2})
- Discharge
  - location: Chartiers Creek
  - average: 40.15 cu ft/s (1.137 m^{3}/s) at mouth with Chartiers Creek

Basin features
- Progression: Chartiers Creek → Ohio River → Mississippi River → Gulf of Mexico
- River system: Ohio River
- Tributaries
  - left: North Branch Robinson Run; Pinkerton Run; Scotts Run
  - right: unnamed tributaries
- Bridges: Midway-Candor Road, Railroad Street, Montgomery Street, Sycamory Street, Jefferson Street, St. John Street, Noblestown Road (x2), S McDonald Street, Laurel Hill Road, Station Street, Main Street, Scotch Hill Road, Union Avenue, Gregg Station Road, Nike Site Road, Walkers Mill Road, Dorrington Road, Noblestown Road, I-79, Noblestown Road

Robinson Run is a 15.90 mi (25.59 km) long 2nd order tributary to Chartiers Creek in Allegheny and Washington Counties, Pennsylvania.

== Variant names ==
According to the Geographic Names Information System, it has also been known historically as:

- Robinson's Run

== Course ==
Robinson Run rises about 0.5 miles southeast of Candor, Pennsylvania and then flows northeasterly to join Chartiers Creek at Glendale.

== Watershed ==
Robinson Run drains 39.90 square miles (103.3 km^{2}) of area, receives about 38.6 in/year of precipitation, has a wetness index of 339.05, and is about 51% forested.

== See also ==
- List of rivers of Pennsylvania
