= Fort Cherry School District =

School district in Pennsylvania, USA

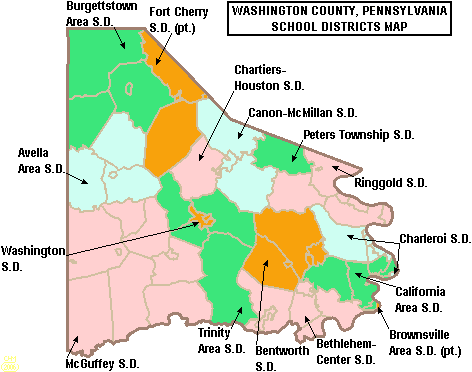

Location
- 110 Fort Cherry Road; McDonald, Pennsylvania 15057 United States

District information
- Type: Public
- Motto: "Truth, Honor, Integrity"
- Grades: K-12
- Established: 1954

Students and staff
- District mascot: Ranger
- Colors: Red, grey and white

Other information
- Website: www.fortcherry.org

Fort Cherry School District region in Allegheny County

Fort Cherry School District is a small, rural public school district located in southwestern Pennsylvania. It covers a portion of outlying Pittsburgh rural areas. The district serves students in a 58-square-mile (150 km^{2}) area that includes the suburban boroughs of McDonald and Midway and the village of Hickory, as well as the predominantly rural townships of Robinson and Mount Pleasant. According to a 2008 local census, it serves a resident population of 8,878. The residents' per capita income was $17,963, while median family income was $45,688.

== History ==
The Fort Cherry School District was established in 1954, bringing together the schools of McDonald, Midway, Mount Pleasant Township, and Robinson Township.

== Schools ==
- Fort Cherry Elementary Center
- Fort Cherry Junior-Senior High School

== Notable alumni ==
- James Garry, Fort Cherry Rangers football coach (1958-2002); inducted into the Pennsylvania Scholastic Football Hall of Fame (1994)
- Marvin Lewis, former head coach of the Cincinnati Bengals
- Marty Schottenheimer, former NFL coach
- Kurt Schottenheimer, former NFL coach. Most recently a secondary coach with the Green Bay Packers in 2008
- Matt Sieg, college football defensive back for the West Virginia Mountaineers
