= Whiskey Run (Chartiers Creek tributary) =

Stream in Pennsylvania, USA

Whiskey Run Tributary to Chartiers Creek
- Location of Whiskey Run mouth Whiskey Run (Chartiers Creek tributary) (the United States)

Location
- Country: United States
- State: Pennsylvania
- County: Allegheny
- Borough: Carnegie; Green Tree

Physical characteristics
- Source: Saw Mill Run divide
  - location: Green Tree, Pennsylvania
  - coordinates: 40°24′52″N 080°02′52″W
  - elevation: 1,000 ft (300 m)
- Mouth: Chartiers Creek
  - location: Carnegie, Pennsylvania
  - coordinates: 40°24′59″N 080°04′42″W
  - elevation: 778 ft (237 m)
- Length: 2.04 mi (3.28 km)
- Basin size: 1.55 square miles (4.0 km^{2})
- Discharge
  - location: Chartiers Creek
  - average: 1.58 cu ft/s (0.045 m^{3}/s) at mouth with Chartiers Creek

Basin features
- Progression: Chartiers Creek → Ohio River → Mississippi River → Gulf of Mexico
- River system: Ohio River
- Tributaries
  - left: unnamed tributaries
  - right: unnamed tributaries
- Bridges: Norsis Drive, Dale Drive, Glencoe Avenue (x2), I-376. Trumbull Drive, Bell Road, Short Street, Noblestown Road, Idlewood Avenue, Bell Avenue

Whiskey Run is a 2.04 mi (3.28 km) long 1st order tributary to Chartiers Creek in Allegheny County, Pennsylvania.

== Course ==
Whiskey Run rises in Green Tree, Pennsylvania, and then flows west to join Chartiers Creek at Carnegie.

== Watershed ==
Whiskey Run drains 1.55 square miles (4.0 km^{2}) of area, receives about 38.1 in/year of precipitation, has a wetness index of 329.30, and is about 19% forested.

== See also ==
- List of rivers of Pennsylvania
