= Presto, Pennsylvania =

- Unincorporated community
- Location within Pennsylvania
- Coordinates: 40°22′25″N 80°07′04″W
- Country: United States
- State: Pennsylvania
- County: Allegheny
- Elevation: 823 ft (251 m)
- Time zone: UTC-5 (Eastern (EST))
  - Summer (DST): UTC-4 (EDT)
- ZIP code: 15142
- Area code: 412
- GNIS feature ID: 1184397

Presto is an unincorporated community in Allegheny County, Pennsylvania, United States. The community is located along Chartiers Creek, 8 miles (13 km) southwest of Pittsburgh. Presto has a post office, with ZIP code 15142, which opened on March 3, 1903. Thoms Run, a tributary of Chartiers Creek, has its confluence here.
