= Midway, Washington County, Pennsylvania =

Borough in Pennsylvania, US

Midway
- Borough
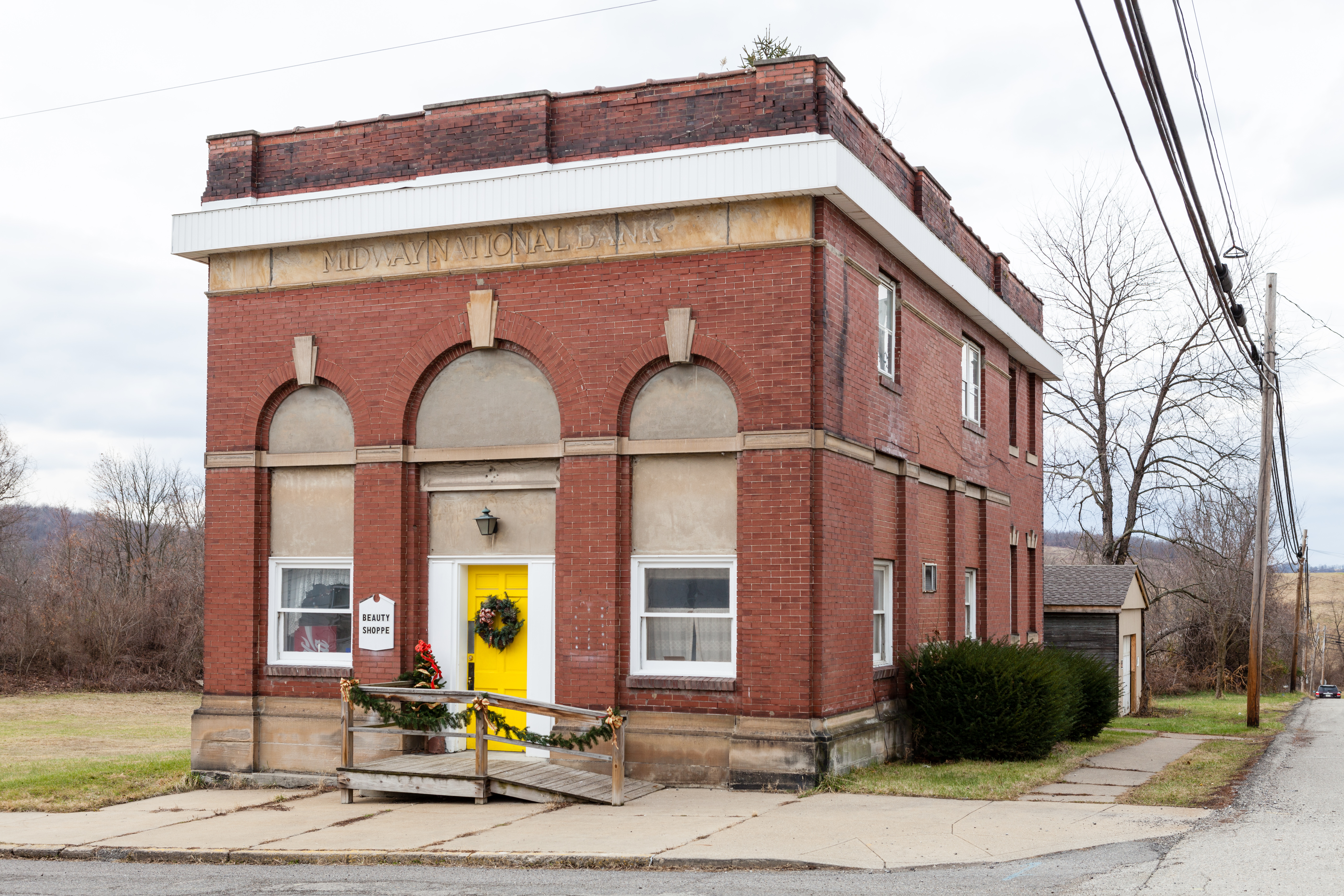
- Commercial building at Washington Ave and Prospect St.

- Location of Midway in Washington County, Pennsylvania.

- Location of Midway in Pennsylvania
- Coordinates: 40°22′5″N 80°17′33″W
- Country: United States
- State: Pennsylvania
- County: Washington
- Established: 1866

Government
  - Mayor: Charles "Chuck" Nourigat

Area
  - Total: 0.44 sq mi (1.14 km^{2})
  - Land: 0.44 sq mi (1.14 km^{2})
  - Water: 0 sq mi (0.00 km^{2})

Population (2020)
  - Total: 924
  - Density: 2,100.1/sq mi (810.85/km^{2})
- Time zone: UTC-4 (EST)
  - Summer (DST): UTC-5 (EDT)
- Area codes: 724, 878
- FIPS code: 42-49240
- GNIS feature ID: 1215672
- Website: https://midwayborough.org/

Midway is a borough that is located in Washington County, Pennsylvania, United States. The population was 921 at the time of the 2020 census.

== History ==
The community gained its name from being the midpoint, or "mid-way" stop along the railroad between Pittsburgh, Pennsylvania and Steubenville, Ohio.

== Geography ==
Midway is located at 40°22′5″N 80°17′33″W (40.368154, -80.292409).

According to the United States Census Bureau, the borough has a total area of 0.4 square miles (1.0 km^{2}), all land.

== Surrounding neighborhoods ==
Midway has two borders: with the townships of Robinson to the north, east and west, and Smith to the south.

== Demographics ==
Historical population
Census	Pop.	Note	%±
1880	581		—
1910	941		—
1920	886		−5.8%
1930	951		7.3%
1940	988		3.9%
1950	993		0.5%
1960	1,012		1.9%
1970	1,188		17.4%
1980	1,187		−0.1%
1990	1,043		−12.1%
2000	982		−5.8%
2010	913		−7.0%
2020	921		0.9%
2025 (est.)	908		−1.4%

As of the census of 2000, there were 982 people, 411 households, and 295 families living in the borough.

The population density was 2,225.0 people per square mile (859.1 people/km^{2}). There were 431 housing units at an average density of 976.6 per square mile (377.1/km^{2}).

The racial makeup of the borough was 98.88% White, 0.51% African American, 0.20% Asian, and 0.41% from two or more races. Hispanic or Latino of any race were 0.61% of the population.

There were 411 households, out of which 28.0% had children under the age of eighteen living with them; 56.0% were married couples living together, 12.7% had a female householder with no husband present, and 28.0% were non-families. 25.3% of all households were made up of individuals, and 12.4% had someone living alone who was sixty-five years of age or older.

The average household size was 2.39 and the average family size was 2.85.

Within the borough, the population was spread out, with 20.5% of residents who were under the age of eighteen, 7.3% who were aged eighteen to twenty-four, 28.0% who were aged twenty-five to forty-four, 26.6% who were aged forty-five to sixty-four, and 17.6% who were sixty-five years of age or older. The median age was forty-one years.

For every one hundred females, there were 89.9 males. For every 100 females who were aged eighteen or older, there were 88.6 males.

The median income for a household in the borough was $36,078, and the median income for a family was $41,458. Males had a median income of $33,958 compared with that of $22,404 for females.

The per capita income for the borough was $17,783.

Approximately 5.5% of families and 8.1% of the population were living below the poverty line, including 13.4% of those who were under the age of eighteen and 7.2% of those who were aged sixty-five or older.

== Education ==
It is in the Fort Cherry School District.

== Notable people ==
- Ralph Felton, former NFL player for the Washington Redskins
- Dick Haley, former NFL football player and Player Personnel Director of the Pittsburgh Steelers and NY Jets
