= Mount Pleasant Township, Washington County, Pennsylvania =

Township in Pennsylvania, US

Coordinates: 40.333°N 80.2997°W

Mount Pleasant Township, Pennsylvania
- Township
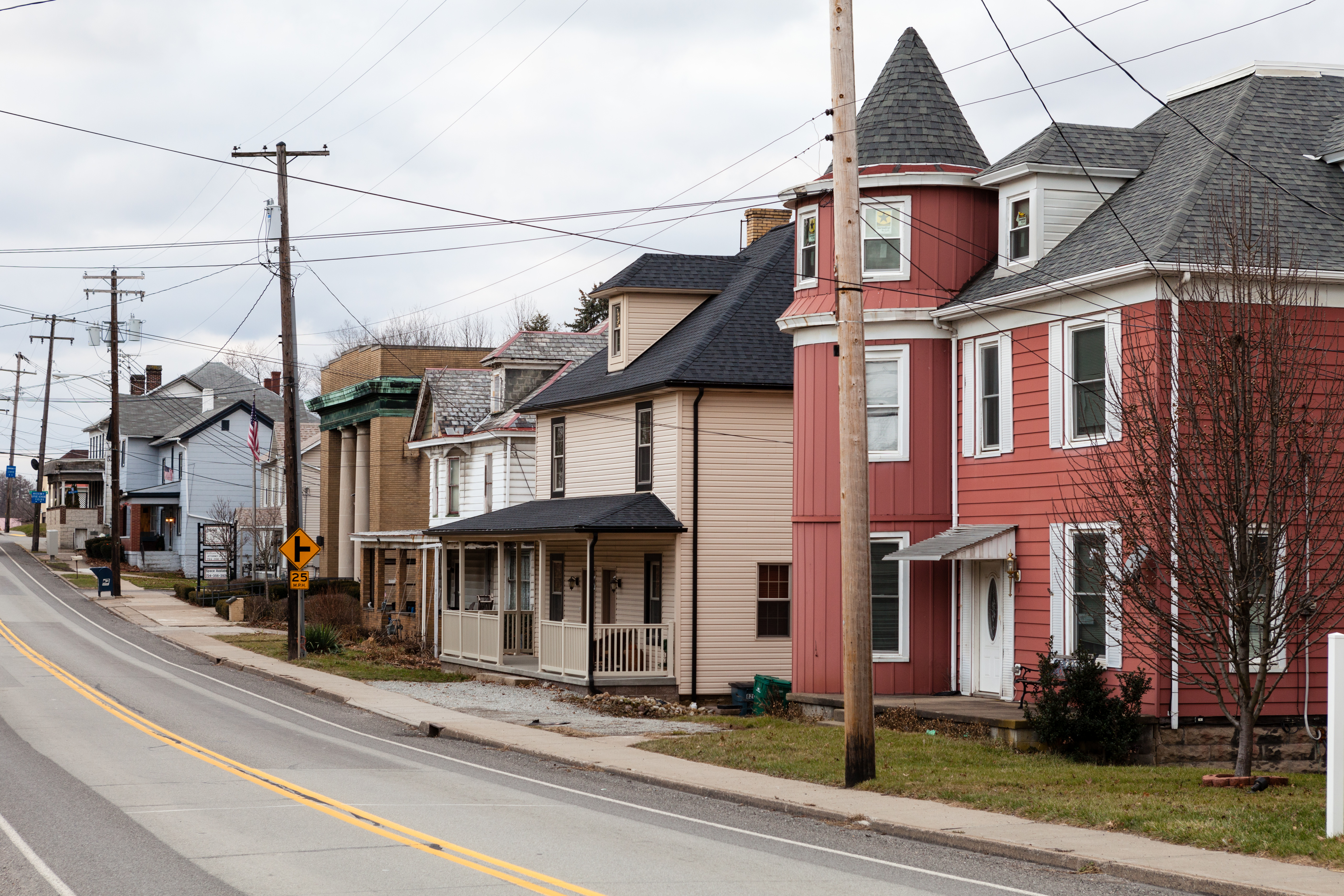
- Looking west near 78 Main Street in Hickory

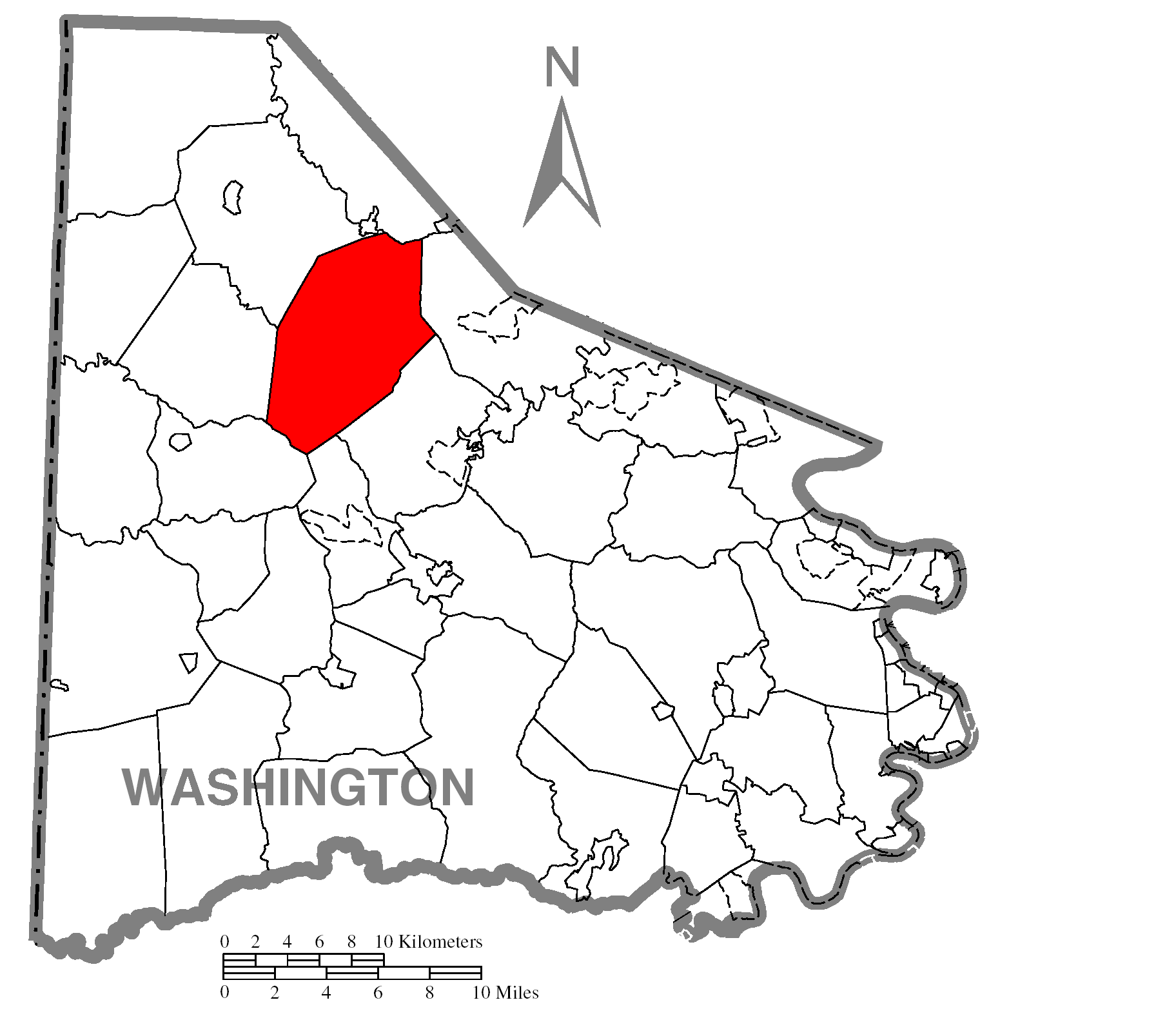
- Location of Mount Pleasant Township in Washington County

- Location of Washington County in Pennsylvania
- Country: United States
- State: Pennsylvania
- County: Washington
- Established: May 10, 1788

Area
  - Total: 35.67 sq mi (92.39 km^{2})
  - Land: 35.59 sq mi (92.18 km^{2})
  - Water: 0.081 sq mi (0.21 km^{2})

Population (2020)
  - Total: 3,282 ▼
  - Estimate (2021): 3,299
  - Density: 98.3/sq mi (37.97/km^{2})
- Time zone: UTC-5 (EST)
  - Summer (DST): UTC-4 (EDT)
- Area code: 724
- FIPS code: 42-125-51864
- Website: www.mpt-pa.com

Historical population
Census	Pop.	Note	%±
2000	3,422		—
2010	3,515		2.7%
2020	3,282		−6.6%
2025 (est.)	3,351		2.1%
U.S. Decennial Census

Mount Pleasant Township is a township in Washington County, Pennsylvania, United States. As of the 2020 census, the township population was 3,282.

== History ==
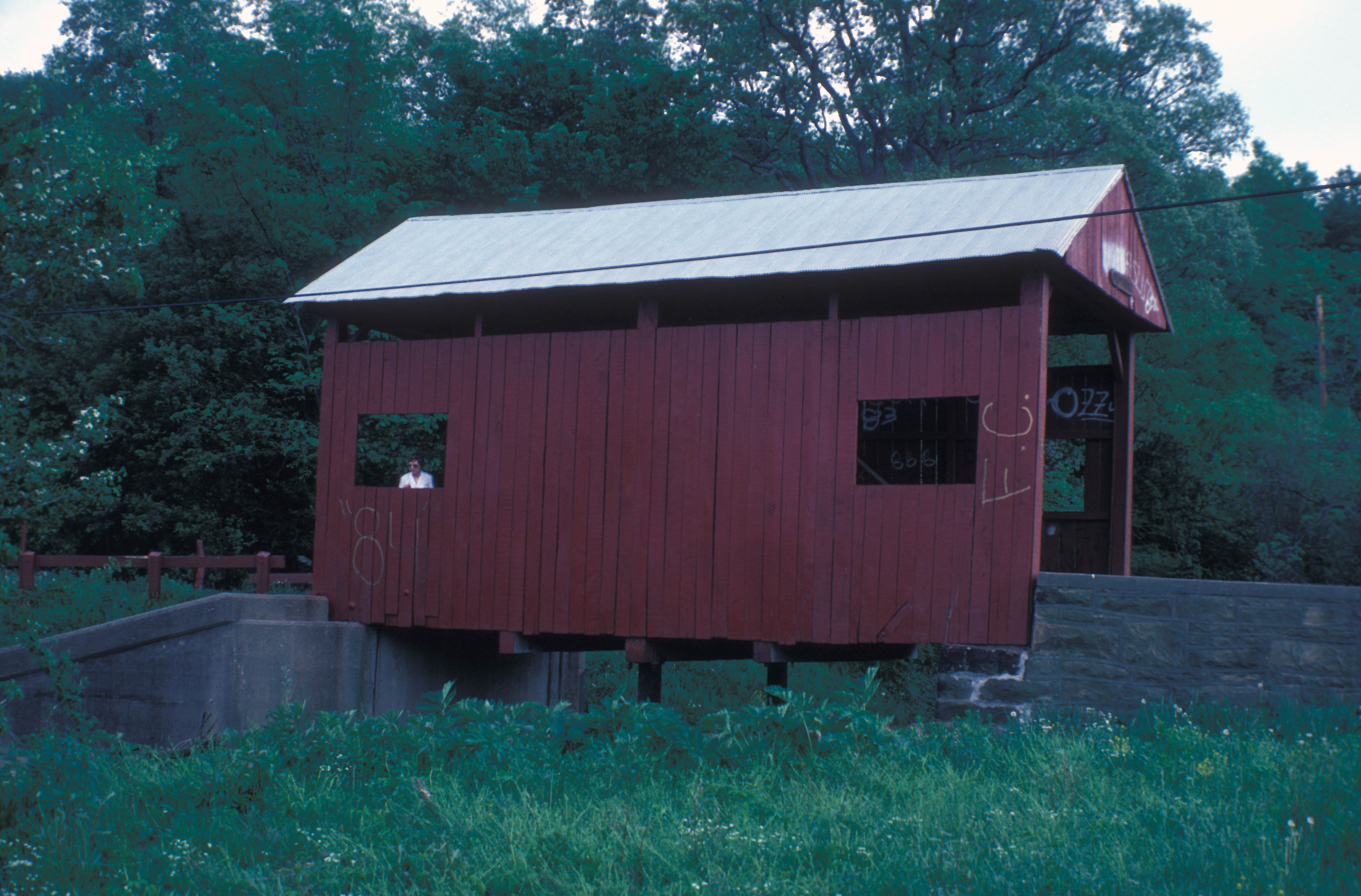
Krepps Covered Bridge

The Krepps Covered Bridge was listed on the National Register of Historic Places in 1979.

== Geography ==
According to the United States Census Bureau, the township has a total area of 35.7 square miles (92 km^{2}), of which 35.6 square miles (92 km^{2}) is land and 0.1 square miles (0.26 km^{2}) (0.22%) is water. It contains part of the census-designated place of Westland.

== Transportation ==
=== Rail ===
==== McGugin Tunnel ====
The McGugin Tunnel is located at latitude - longitude coordinates of N 40.28674 and W -80.33173. The nearest major town is Hickory, Pennsylvania, where it passes under Pennsylvania Route 18. The tunnel is at an elevation of 1,263 feet (385 m).

==== Hickory Tunnel ====
The Hickory Tunnel is close to the McGugin Tunnel. It has the same nearest major town, Hickory, where the tunnel passes under Pennsylvania Route 50. The elevation of the tunnel is 1,286 feet (392 m).

Several major roads pass through the township of Mount Pleasant: Pennsylvania Route 519, Pennsylvania Route 50, and Pennsylvania Route 18.

== Demographics ==
As of the census of 2000, there were 3,422 people, 1,279 households, and 1,006 families residing in the township.

The population density was 96.0 people per square mile (37.1 people/km^{2}). There were 1,348 housing units at an average density of 37.8 per square mile (14.6/km^{2}).

The racial makeup of the township was 96.49% White, 2.98% African American, 0.09% Asian, and 0.44% from two or more races. Hispanic or Latino of any race were 0.09% of the population.

There were 1,279 households, out of which 32.5% had children under the age of eighteen living with them; 66.1% were married couples living together, 9.0% had a female householder with no husband present, and 21.3% were non-families. 18.9% of all households were made up of individuals, and 9.8% had someone living alone who was sixty-five years of age or older.

The average household size was 2.67 and the average family size was 3.06.

In the township the population was spread out, with 24.0% under the age of eighteen, 7.1% from eighteen to twenty-four, 27.7% from twenty-five to forty-four, 25.7% from forty-five to sixty-four, and 15.6% who were sixty-five years of age or older. The median age was forty years.

For every one hundred females, there were one hundred males. For every one hundred females who were aged eighteen or older, there were 98.9 males.

The median income for a household in the township was $41,172, and the median income for a family was $48,915. Males had a median income of $35,750 compared with that of $22,917 for females.

The per capita income for the township was $18,800.

Roughly 3.6% of families and 5.3% of the population were living below the poverty line, including 5.9% of those who were under the age of eighteen and 7.9% of those who were aged sixty-five or older.

Mount Pleasant Township is home to four small communities: Hickory, Southview, the Cherry Valley Lakeview Estates and Primrose. It is also home to the Fort Cherry School District.
