= Chartiers Run (Chartiers Creek tributary) =

Stream in Pennsylvania, US

Chartiers Run Tributary to Chartiers Creek
- Location of Chartiers Run mouth Chartiers Run (Chartiers Creek tributary) (the United States)

Location
- Country: United States
- State: Pennsylvania
- County: Washington
- Borough: Houston

Physical characteristics
- Source: Burgetts Fork divide
  - location: about 1 mile southwest of Hickory, Pennsylvania
  - coordinates: 40°17′16″N 080°19′25″W
  - elevation: 1,200 ft (370 m)
- Mouth: Chartiers Creek
  - location: Houston, Pennsylvania
  - coordinates: 40°14′51″N 080°12′27″W
  - elevation: 950 ft (290 m)
- Length: 8.53 mi (13.73 km)
- Basin size: 22.32 square miles (57.8 km^{2})
- Discharge
  - location: Chartiers Creek
  - average: 24.80 cu ft/s (0.702 m^{3}/s) at mouth with Chartiers Creek

Basin features
- Progression: Chartiers Creek → Ohio River → Mississippi River → Gulf of Mexico
- River system: Ohio River
- Tributaries
  - left: Westland Run; Plum Run
  - right: unnamed tributaries
- Bridges: Main Street, Donaldson Road, Elm Road, Gulla Lane, Red Fox Road, Old Hickory Ridge Road, Kings Road, Paxton Road, W Pike Street

Chartiers Run is a tributary of Chartiers Creek in Washington County, Pennsylvania, in the United States. It was named after Peter Chartier, a trapper of French and Native American parentage who established a trading post at the mouth of Chartiers Creek in 1743.

Chartiers Run joins Chartiers Creek at the borough of Houston.

== See also ==
- List of rivers of Pennsylvania
