= Robinson Township, Washington County, Pennsylvania =

Township in Pennsylvania, US

Robinson Township
- Township
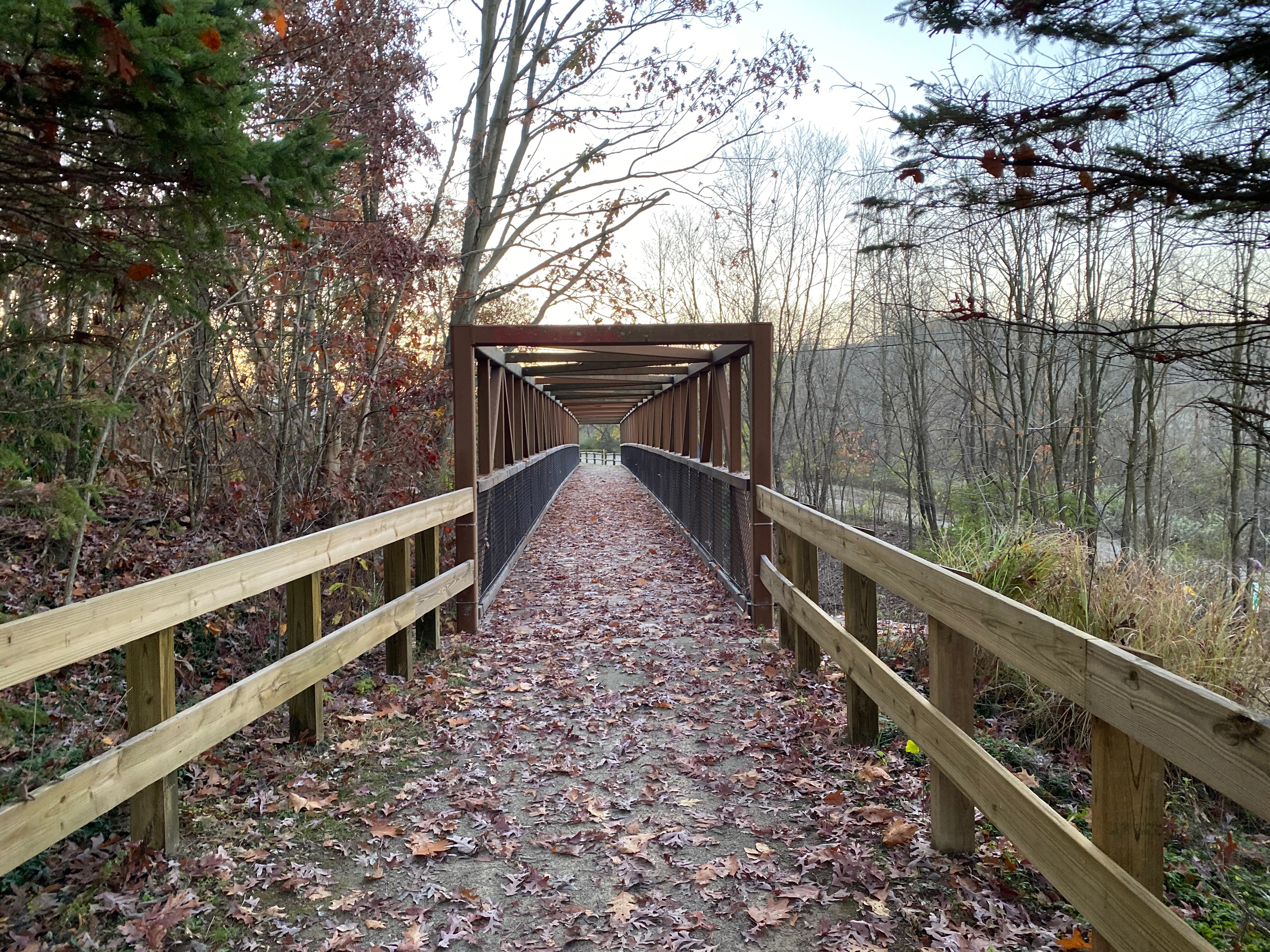
- Montour Trail bridge over PA 980

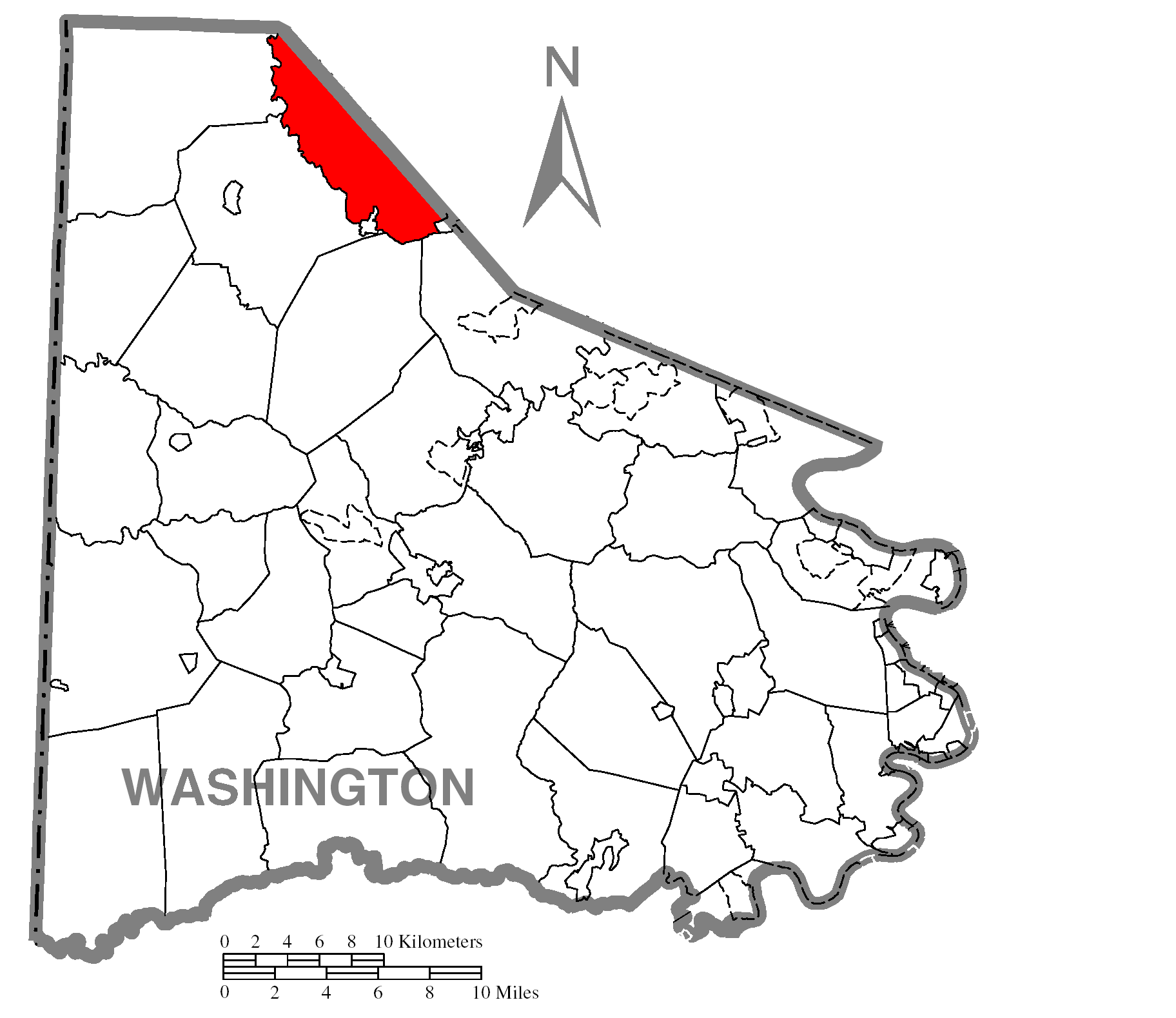
- Location of Robinson Township in Washington County

- Location of Washington County in Pennsylvania
- Country: United States
- State: Pennsylvania
- County: Washington County

Area
  - Total: 21.28 sq mi (55.11 km^{2})
  - Land: 21.22 sq mi (54.96 km^{2})
  - Water: 0.058 sq mi (0.15 km^{2})

Population (2020)
  - Total: 1,707
  - Estimate (2022): 1,689
  - Density: 80.4/sq mi (31.06/km^{2})
- Time zone: UTC-4 (EST)
  - Summer (DST): UTC-5 (EDT)
- Area code: 724
- FIPS code: 42-125-65376
- Website: https://robinsonpa.gov/

Historical population
Census	Pop.	Note	%±
2000	2,193		—
2010	1,931		−11.9%
2020	1,707		−11.6%
2025 (est.)	1,672		−2.1%
U.S. Decennial Census

Robinson Township is a township in Washington County, Pennsylvania, United States. The population was 1,707 at the 2020 census. It was formerly an area of interest concerning coal mining. A portion of the Montour Trail passes through Robinson Township.

== Geography ==
According to the United States Census Bureau, the township has a total area of 21.3 square miles (55 km^{2}), of which, 21.2 square miles (55 km^{2}) of it is land and 0.1 square miles (0.3 km^{2}) of it (0.27%) is water.

== Surrounding neighborhoods ==
Robinson Township has eight borders, including Hanover Township to the west, Smith Township to the southwest, the borough of Midway and Mount Pleasant Township to the south, Cecil Township to the south-southeast, the borough of McDonald to the southeast, and the Allegheny County townships of North Fayette to the east and Findlay to the northeast.

== Demographics ==
As of the census of 2000, there were 2,193 people, 841 households, and 624 families living in the township. The population density was 103.7 people per square mile (40.0 people/km^{2}). There were 902 housing units at an average density of 42.6 per square mile (16.4/km^{2}). The racial makeup of the township was 95.49% White, 3.33% African American, 0.23% Native American, 0.09% Asian, 0.05% from other races, and 0.82% from two or more races. Hispanic or Latino of any race were 0.18% of the population.

There were 841 households, out of which 32.6% had children under the age of 18 living with them, 60.5% were married couples living together, 7.7% had a female householder with no husband present, and 25.7% were non-families. 22.1% of all households were made up of individuals, and 8.4% had someone living alone who was 65 years of age or older. The average household size was 2.59 and the average family size was 3.03.

In the township the population was spread out, with 24.9% under the age of 18, 6.7% from 18 to 24, 29.4% from 25 to 44, 24.4% from 45 to 64, and 14.6% who were 65 years of age or older. The median age was 38 years. For every 100 females, there were 100.5 males. For every 100 females age 18 and over, there were 100.5 males.

The median income for a household in the township was $37,083, and the median income for a family was $41,813. Males had a median income of $35,275 versus $24,875 for females. The per capita income for the township was $16,797. About 5.3% of families and 8.0% of the population were below the poverty line, including 8.5% of those under age 18 and 8.5% of those age 65 or over.
