= Chartiers Creek =

Stream in Pennsylvania, U.S.

Chartiers Creek Tributary to Ohio River
- 1751 map depicting Chartiers Creek (labeled as "Shartees Cr.", at top edge of map)

- Location of Chartiers Creek mouth Chartiers Creek (the United States)

Location
- Country: United States
- State: Pennsylvania
- County: Allegheny; Washington
- City: Washington
- Borough: Canonsburg; Carnegie; McKees Rocks; Thornburg; Heidelberg; Bridgeville; Houston

Physical characteristics
- Source: Fork of Bane Creek divide
  - location: about 0.25 miles north of Van Buren, Pennsylvania
  - coordinates: 40°05′05″N 080°17′16″W
  - elevation: 1,220 ft (370 m)
- Mouth: Ohio River
  - location: McKees Rocks, Pennsylvania
  - coordinates: 40°27′54″N 080°03′10″W
  - elevation: 710 ft (220 m)
- Length: 47.60 mi (76.60 km)
- Basin size: 277.42 square miles (718.5 km^{2})
- Discharge
  - location: Ohio River
  - average: 321.31 cu ft/s (9.098 m^{3}/s) at mouth with Ohio River

Basin features
- Progression: generally northeast
- River system: Ohio River
- Tributaries
  - left: Georges Run; Chartiers Run; McPherson Creek; Coal Run; Millers Run; Thoms Run; Robinson Run; Campbells Run
  - right: Catfish Creek; Little Chartiers Creek; Brush Run; McLaughlin Run; Painters Run; Scrubgrass Run; Whiskey Run
- Waterbodies: Reservoir #2
- Bridges: PA 18 (x4), Farmer Lane, Old Scales Road, Vaneal Drive, Mounts Road, Jolly School Road, Old Plank Road, PA 18, Walker Lane, PA 18, Ridgewood Drive, US 40, I-70, Caldwell Avenue, Jessop Place, W Wylie Avenue, Woodland Avenue, PA 844, Wallace Lane, PA 18, Oak Grove Road, N Main Street Ext., Country Club Road, Pike Street, Racetrack Road, Vandale Drive, S. Johnson Road, S Main Street, Strabane Avenue, S. Jefferson Avenue, S Central Avenue, Morganza Road, Curry Avenue, Curry Hill Road, Southpoint Boulevard, I-79, Morganza Road, Atlas Lane, Maple Lane, Georgetown Road, Boyce Road, Mayview Road, PA 50, I-79, Prestley Road, Steen Road, I-79, PA 50, Greentree Road, Washington Avenue, Hammond Street, Carothers Avenue, W Main Street, Mansfield Boulevard, Chestnut Street, I-376, Rutgers Road, Stubenville Pike, Wind Gap Bridge, PA 51, W Carson Street

Chartiers Creek is a tributary of the Ohio River in Western Pennsylvania in the United States. The creek was named after Peter Chartier, a trapper of French and Native American parentage who established a trading post at the mouth of the creek in 1743.

== Course ==
Chartiers Creek winds from its headwaters in Washington County through Allegheny County, where it meets the Ohio River at McKees Rocks and Pittsburgh's West End, three miles west of the Point at Pittsburgh.

== Tributaries ==
(Mouth at the Ohio River)

- Little Chartiers Creek joins Chartiers Creek at Peters Township.
- Chartiers Run joins Chartiers Creek at the borough of Houston.

== Environmental issues ==
Acid mine drainage, agricultural and industrial runoff, and sewer overflow made Chartiers Creek one of the most polluted watersheds in Pennsylvania. Although improvements have been made, the watershed remains significantly impaired.

The main source of acid mine drainage (Iron) in the Chartiers Creek watershed is the Gladden Discharge along Millers Run Creek, a tributary that meets Chartiers Creek in Bridgeville. In 2020, the South Fayette Conservation Group started a project that will treat the polluted water before it enters Millers Run. This will result in Miller’s Run running clear from Cecil to Bridgeville for the first time in generations, while eliminating the single biggest source of pollution along Chartiers Creek

Plans have been considered to establish the course of Chartiers Creek as a greenway including a multi-use path that would stretch from Canonsburg Lake to the Ohio River. Such a path could eventually provide connections with the Montour Trail near Lawrence, the Panhandle Trail near Carnegie, and the Three Rivers Heritage Trail in McKees Rocks.

== See also ==
- List of rivers of Pennsylvania
- Ohio River Trail
