= Millers Run (Chartiers Creek tributary) =

Stream in Pennsylvania, USA

Millers Run Tributary to Chartiers Creek
- Location of Millers Run mouth Millers Run (Chartiers Creek tributary) (the United States)

Location
- Country: United States
- State: Pennsylvania
- County: Allegheny; Washington

Physical characteristics
- Source: Raccoon Creek divide
  - location: Pond about 2 miles southwest of Primrose, Pennsylvania
  - coordinates: 40°20′09″N 080°17′41″W
  - elevation: 1,200 ft (370 m)
- Mouth: Chartiers Creek
  - location: about 0.25 miles northeast of Sygan Hill, Pennsylvania
  - coordinates: 40°21′55″N 080°07′11″W
  - elevation: 807 ft (246 m)
- Length: 12.24 mi (19.70 km)
- Basin size: 28.10 square miles (72.8 km^{2})
- Discharge
  - location: Chartiers Creek
  - average: 29.68 cu ft/s (0.840 m^{3}/s) at mouth with Chartiers Creek

Basin features
- Progression: Chartiers Creek → Ohio River → Mississippi River → Gulf of Mexico
- River system: Ohio River
- Tributaries
  - left: Fishing Run; Dolphin Run
  - right: unnamed tributaries
- Bridges: Fort Cherry Road, Zuk Lane, Southview Road (x2), Antil Street, Galati Road, Southview Road, PA 980, PA 50, Glass Hill Road, Cowden Road, Ridgewood Drive, Muse Bishop Road, Mawhinney Road, PA 50 (x3), Parks Road, PA 50, Millers Run Road, Cuddy Lane, Morgan Hill Road, Millers Run Road, Wabash Avenue, Millers Run Road

Millers Run is a 12.24 mi (19.70 km) long 3rd order tributary to Chartiers Creek in Allegheny and Washington Counties, Pennsylvania.

== Variant names ==
According to the Geographic Names Information System, it has also been known historically as:

- Miller's Run

== Course ==
Millers Run rises in a pond about 2 miles southwest of Primrose, Pennsylvania and then flows east-northeast to join Chartiers Creek at about 0.25 miles northeast of Sygan Hill, Pennsylvania.

== Watershed ==
Millers Run drains 28.10 square miles (72.8 km^{2}) of area, receives about 39.0 in/year of precipitation, has a wetness index of 332.89, and is about 52% forested.

== See also ==
- List of rivers of Pennsylvania
